= Verity Lambert =

English television and film producer (1935–2007)

Verity Lambert OBE
- Verity Lambert, from a 1965 newspaper
- Born: Verity Ann Lambert; 27 November 1935; London, England
- Died: 22 November 2007 (aged 71); London, England
- Education: Roedean School
- Alma mater: University of Paris
- Occupations: Television and film producer
- Known for: First producer of Doctor Who
- Spouse: Colin Bucksey (m. 1973; div. 1987)

Verity Ann Lambert (27 November 1935 – 22 November 2007) was an English television and film producer.

Lambert began working in television in the 1950s. She began her career as a producer at the BBC by becoming the founding producer of the science-fiction series Doctor Who from 1963 until 1965. She left the BBC in 1969 and worked for other television companies, notably having a long association with Thames Television and its Euston Films offshoot in the 1970s and 1980s. Her many credits as producer include Adam Adamant Lives!, The Naked Civil Servant, Rock Follies, Minder, Widows, G.B.H., Jonathan Creek, Love Soup and Eldorado. She also worked in the film industry for Thorn EMI Screen Entertainment. She was an associate of the Beatles manager, Brian Epstein. From 1985 she ran her own production company, Cinema Verity. She continued to work as a producer until the year she died.

Women were rarely television producers in Britain at the beginning of Lambert's career. When she was appointed to Doctor Who in 1963, she was BBC Television's only female drama producer, as well as the youngest. The website of the Museum of Broadcast Communications hails her as "not only one of Britain's leading businesswomen, but possibly the most powerful member of the nation's entertainment industry ... Lambert has served as a symbol of the advances won by women in the media". The British Film Institute's Screenonline website describes Lambert as "one of those producers who can often create a fascinating small screen universe from a slim script and half-a-dozen congenial players."

The University of Strathclyde awarded Lambert an Honorary Doctor of Laws in April 1988.

== Early career in independent television ==
Lambert was born in London, the daughter of a Jewish accountant, and was educated at Roedean School. She left Roedean at sixteen with six O-Levels and pursued a six months language course at the University of Paris enrolling at a secretarial college upon returning to London for eighteen months. She later credited her interest in the structural and characterisational aspects of scriptwriting to an inspirational English teacher. Lambert's first job was the typing of menus at the Kensington De Vere Hotel, which employed her because she had been to France and could speak French. In 1956, she entered the television industry as a secretary at Granada Television's press office. She was sacked from this job after six months.

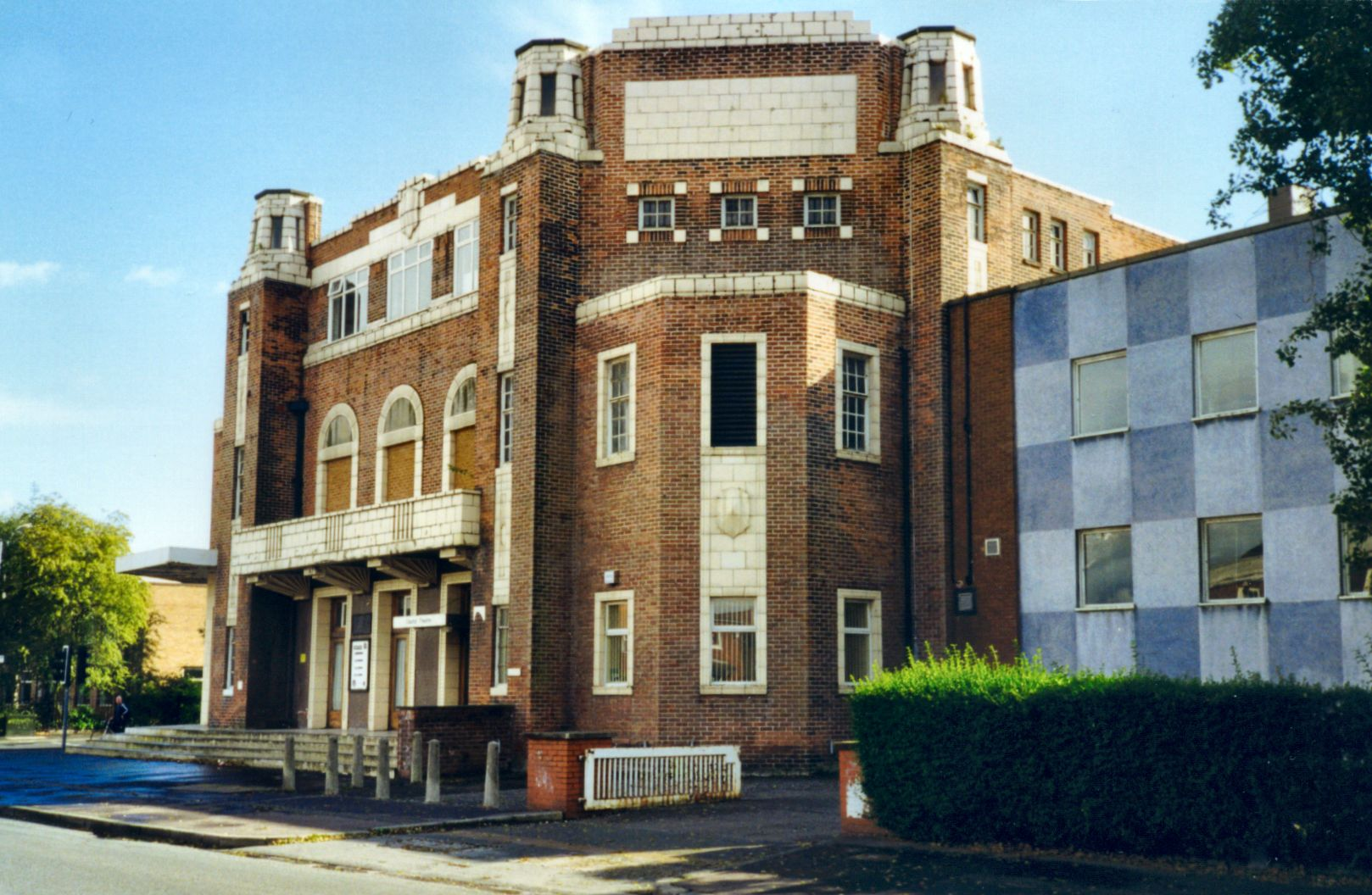
ABC Weekend TV's studios at Didsbury, Manchester, where Lambert worked in the late 1950s

Following her dismissal from Granada, Lambert took a job as a shorthand-typist at ABC Weekend TV. She soon became the secretary to the company's Head of Drama and then a production secretary working on a programme called State Your Case. She then moved from administration to production, working on drama programming on ABC's popular anthology series Armchair Theatre and also early episodes of The Avengers, both of which were then overseen by the new Head of Drama, Canadian producer Sydney Newman.

Catastrophic incidents could occur on live television of this era. On 28 November 1958, while Lambert was working as a Production Assistant on Armchair Theatre, an actor died during a live broadcast of Underground and she had to take responsibility for directing the cameras from the studio gallery while director Ted Kotcheff worked with the actors on the studio floor to accommodate the loss.

In 1961, Lambert left ABC, spending a year working as the personal assistant to American television producer David Susskind at the independent production company Talent Associates in New York. Returning to England, she rejoined ABC with an ambition to direct, but remained a production assistant and found it impossible to gain promotion. She decided that, if she could not find advancement within a year, she would abandon television as a career.

== BBC career ==
=== Doctor Who ===
In December 1962, Sydney Newman left ABC to take up the position of Head of Drama at BBC Television, and the following year Lambert joined him at the corporation. Newman had recruited her to produce Doctor Who, a programme he had personally conceived and initiated as an educational science-fiction serial for early Saturday evenings. The programme concerned the adventures of an old man travelling through space and time in his TARDIS, disguised as a police box. In some quarters, the series was not expected to last longer than thirteen weeks.

Although Lambert was not Newman's first choice to produce the series—Don Taylor and Shaun Sutton had both declined the position—he was very keen to ensure that Lambert took the job after his experience of working with her at ABC. "I think the best thing I ever did on that was to find Verity Lambert," he told Doctor Who Magazine in 1993. "I remembered Verity as being bright and, to use the phrase, full of piss and vinegar! She was gutsy and she used to fight and argue with me, even though she was not at a very high level as a production assistant."

When Lambert arrived at the BBC in June 1963, she was initially given a more experienced associate producer, Mervyn Pinfield, to assist her. Doctor Who debuted on 23 November 1963 and quickly became a success for the BBC, chiefly on the popularity of the alien creatures known as Daleks. Lambert's superior, Head of Serials Donald Wilson, had strongly advised against using the script in which the Daleks first appeared, but after the serial's successful airing, he said that Lambert clearly knew the series far better than he did, and he would no longer interfere in her decisions. The success of Doctor Who and the Daleks also garnered press attention for Lambert herself; in 1964, the Daily Mail published a feature on the series focusing on its young producer's looks: "The operation of the Daleks ... is conducted by a remarkably attractive young woman called Verity Lambert who, at 28, is not only the youngest but the only female drama producer at B.B.C. TV ... [T]all, dark and shapely, she became positively forbidding when I suggested that the Daleks might one day take over Dr. Who."

Lambert oversaw the first two seasons of the programme and the first part of the third, eventually leaving in 1965. "There comes a time when a series needs new input," she told Doctor Who Magazine thirty years later. "It's not that I wasn't fond of Doctor Who, I simply felt that the time had come. It had been eighteen very concentrated months, something like seventy shows. I know people do soaps forever now, but I felt Doctor Who needed someone to come in with a different view." 15 episodes produced by Lambert—all episodes of Marco Polo, two episodes of The Reign of Terror, two episodes of The Crusade, three episodes of Galaxy 4 and the standalone Mission to the Unknown—were not retained in the BBC Archives, mainly affecting her first year working on the show.

=== Other BBC productions ===
Lambert moved on to produce another BBC show developed by Newman, the swashbuckling action-adventure series Adam Adamant Lives! (1966–67). The long development period of Adam Adamant delayed its production, and during this delay Newman gave her the initial episodes of a new soap opera, The Newcomers, to produce. Further productions for the BBC included a season of the crime drama Detective (1968–69) and a 26-part series of adaptations of the stories of William Somerset Maugham (1969).

In 1969 the comedy series Monty Python's Flying Circus made reference to Lambert in a sketch entitled "Buying a Bed" from the episode "Full Frontal Nudity", which was broadcast on BBC 1 on 7 December 1969. Eric Idle plays a salesman named "Mr Verity" and Graham Chapman plays a salesman named "Mr Lambert".

In 1969 Lambert left the staff of the BBC to join London Weekend Television, where she produced Budgie (1970–72) and Between the Wars (1973). She returned to the BBC on a freelance basis to produce Shoulder to Shoulder (1974), a series of six 75-minute plays about the suffragette movement of the early 20th century.

== Thames Television and Euston Films ==
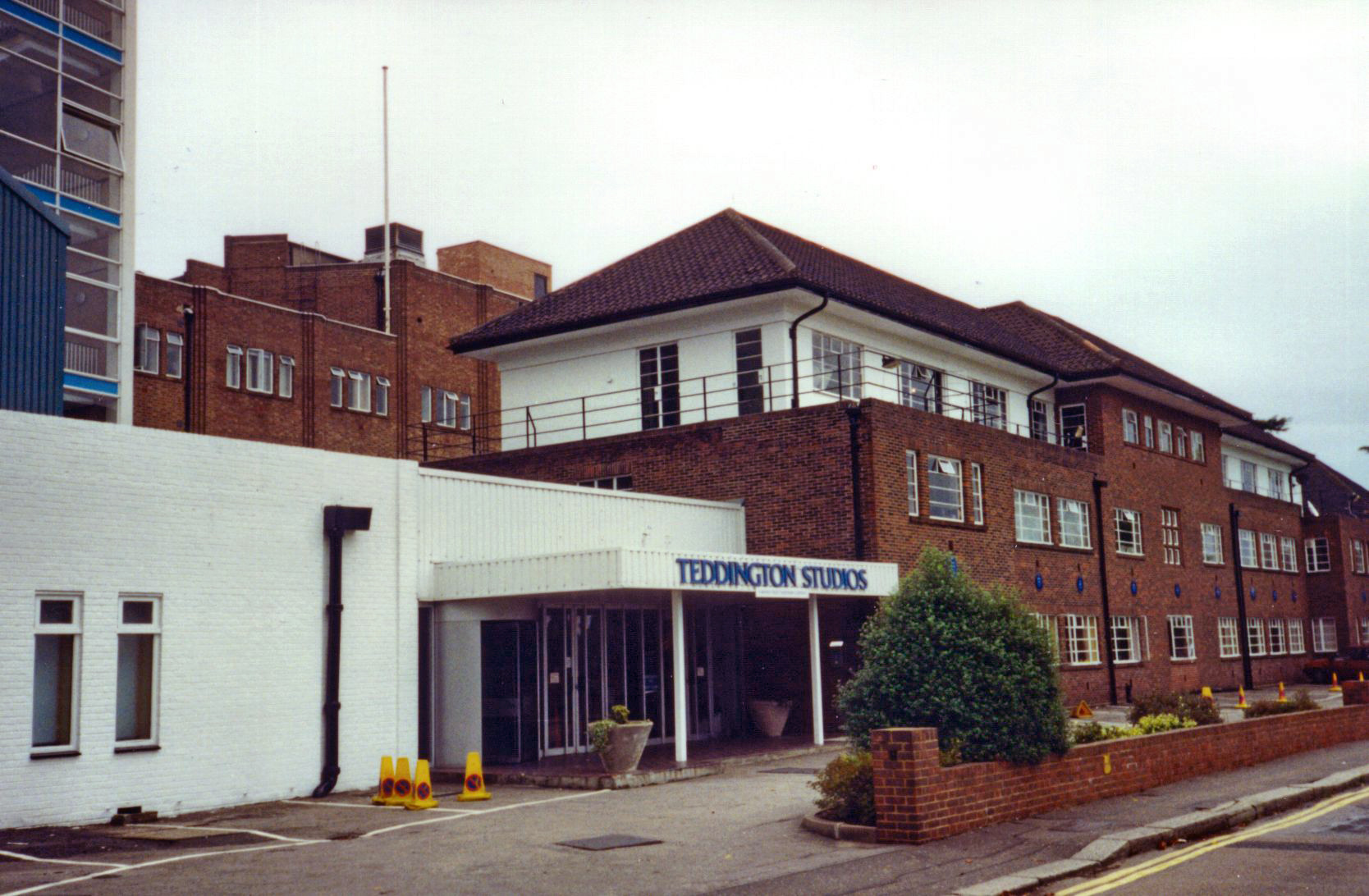
Teddington Studios in London, where several Thames Television dramas overseen by Lambert, such as Rock Follies, were produced in the 1970s.

Later in 1974, Lambert became Head of Drama at Thames Television. During her time in this position she oversaw several high-profile and successful contributions to the ITV network, including The Naked Civil Servant (1975), Rock Follies (1976–77), Rumpole of the Bailey (1978–92) and Edward and Mrs Simpson (1978). In 1976, she was also made responsible for overseeing the work of Euston Films, Thames' subsidiary film production company, at the time best known as the producers of The Sweeney. In 1979 she transferred to Euston full-time as the company's chief executive, overseeing productions such as Quatermass (1979), Minder (1979–94) and Widows (1983). In recognition of her contribution to the film industry, Lambert was appointed as a Governor of the British Film Institute in 1981, serving on the organisation's Board until 1986.

At Thames and Euston, Lambert enjoyed the most sustained period of critical and popular success of her career. The Naked Civil Servant won a British Academy Television Award (BAFTA) for its star John Hurt as well as a Broadcasting Press Guild Award and a prize at the Prix Italia; Rock Follies won a BAFTA and a Royal Television Society Award, while Widows also gained BAFTA nominations and ratings of over 12 million—unusually for a drama serial, it picked up viewers over the course of its six-week run. Minder became the longest-running series produced by Euston Films, surviving for over a decade following Lambert's departure from the company.

Television historian Lez Cooke described Lambert's time in control of the drama department at Thames as "an adventurous period for the company, demonstrating that it was not only the BBC that was capable of producing progressive television drama during the 1970s. Lambert wanted Thames to produce drama series 'which were attempting in one way or another to tackle modern problems and life,' an ambition which echoed the philosophy of her mentor Sydney Newman." Howard Schuman, the writer of Rock Follies, also later praised the bravery of Lambert's commissioning. "Verity Lambert had just arrived as head of drama at Thames TV and she went for broke," he told The Observer newspaper in 2002. "She commissioned a serial, Jennie: Lady Randolph Churchill, for safety, but also Bill Brand, one of the edgiest political dramas ever, and us ... Before we had even finished making the first series, Verity commissioned the second."

Lambert's association with Thames and Euston Films continued into the 1980s. In 1982, she rejoined the staff of parent company Thames Television as director of drama, and was given a seat on the company's board. In November 1982 she left Thames, but remained as chief executive at Euston until leaving in November of the following year to take up her first post in the film industry, as director of production for Thorn EMI Screen Entertainment, making her the first woman to run a film studio.

Her job here was somewhat frustrating as the British film industry was in one of its periodic states of flux, but she did produce several feature films, including Clockwise (1986). Lambert later expressed some regret on her time in the film industry in a feature for The Independent newspaper. "Unfortunately, the person who hired me left, and the person who came in didn't want to produce films and didn't want me. While I managed to make some films I was proud of—Dennis Potter's Dreamchild, and Clockwise with John Cleese—it was terribly tough and not a very happy experience." Filmink magazine called Lambert's slate "varied, ambitious and aimed at quality" but felt too many movies "either turned out surprisingly poorly as films, or turned out well but audiences simply didn’t come... perhaps Lambert’s taste was a little too high brow to run a big fat studio."

== Cinema Verity ==
In late 1985, Lambert left Thorn EMI, frustrated at the lack of success and at restructuring measures being undertaken by the company. She established her own independent production company, Cinema Verity. The company's first production was the feature film A Cry in the Dark (1988), starring Sam Neill and Meryl Streep based on the "dingo baby" case in Australia. Cinema Verity's first television series, the BBC1 sitcom May to December, debuted in 1989 and ran until 1994. The company also produced another successful BBC1 sitcom, So Haunt Me, which ran from 1992 to 1994.

Lambert executive produced Alan Bleasdale's hard-hitting drama serial G.B.H. (1991), commissioned by Channel 4, which won several awards. Her relationship with Bleasdale was not entirely smooth – the writer has admitted in subsequent interviews that he "wanted to kill Verity Lambert" after she insisted on the cutting of large portions of his first draft script before production began. Bleasdale subsequently admitted that she was right about the majority of the cut material, and when the production was finished, he only missed one small scene from those she had demanded be excised.

A less successful Cinema Verity production was the soap opera Eldorado, a co-production with the BBC, set in a British expatriate community in Spain. At the time, it was the most expensive commission the BBC had given out to an independent production company. Launched with a major publicity campaign and running in a high-profile slot three evenings a week on BBC1, the series was critically mauled and lasted only a year, from 1992 to 1993. Lambert's biography at Screenonline suggests some reasons for this failure: "With on-location production facilities and an evident striving for a genuinely contemporary flavour, Lambert's costly Euro soap Eldorado suggested a degree of ambition ... which it seemed in the event ill-equipped to realise, and a potentially interesting subject tailed off into implausible melodrama. Eldorado's plotting ... was disappointingly ponderous. As a result, the expatriate community in southern Spain theme and milieu was exploited rather than explored."

Other reviewers, even the best part of a decade after the programme's cancellation, were much harsher, with Rupert Smith's comments in The Guardian in 2002 being a typical example. "A £10 million farce that left the BBC with egg all over its entire body and put an awful lot of Equity members back on the dole ... it will always be remembered as the most expensive flop of all time."

In the early 1990s, Lambert attempted to win the rights to produce Doctor Who independently for the BBC; this effort was unsuccessful because the corporation was already in negotiations with producer Philip Segal in the United States. Cinema Verity projects that did reach production included Sleepers (BBC1, 1991) and The Cazalets (BBC One, 2001), the latter co-produced by actress Joanna Lumley, whose idea it was to adapt the novels by Elizabeth Jane Howard.

Lambert continued to work as a freelance producer outside of her own company. She produced the popular BBC One comedy-drama series Jonathan Creek, by writer David Renwick, ever since taking over the role for its second series in 1998. From then until 2004, she produced eighteen episodes of the programme across four short seasons, plus two Christmas Specials. She and Renwick also collaborated on another comedy-drama, Love Soup, starring Tamsin Greig and transmitted on BBC One in the autumn of 2005.Her last work was to produce the second series of Love Soup.

The British Film Institute conferred a Fellowship on Lambert in 1997

In the 2002 New Year's Honours list Lambert was appointed an Officer of the Order of the British Empire (OBE) for her services to film and television production, and the same year she received BAFTA's Alan Clarke Award for Outstanding Contribution to Television.

In 2007, Lambert was posthumously awarded the Women in Film ‘Working Title Films Lifetime Achievement Award’.

== Personal life ==
In 1973, Lambert married television director Colin Bucksey. They separated in 1984 and divorced in 1987. She had no children, once telling an interviewer, "I can't stand babies—no, I love babies as long as their parents take them away."

== Death ==
Lambert died of cancer on 22 November 2007, in London, one day before the 44th anniversary of Doctor Who, whose first episode had been overshadowed by the assassination, on 22 November 1963, of President Kennedy. She was due to have been presented with a lifetime achievement award at the Women in Film and Television Awards the following month. She was cremated at Golders Green Crematorium.

== Further Information ==
Lambert donated personal archives, including her OBE, two BAFTA Awards, ‘Fellow of the British Film Institute’ award, photographs, including from various production sets, and her inscribed producer's chair to the Archives of the University of Strathclyde

== Legacy ==
In 2000, the Lambert productions Doctor Who and The Naked Civil Servant finished third and fourth respectively in a British Film Institute poll of the 100 Greatest British Television Programmes of the 20th century.

In the 2007 Doctor Who episode "Human Nature", the Tenth Doctor refers to his parents as "Sydney" and "Verity", a tribute to both Newman and Lambert. She is further honoured in the episode "The End of Time" when the Doctor visits the great-granddaughter of Matron Joan Redfern, the human love interest he gave up to reclaim his Time Lord memories in the episode "Human Nature"; the character is named "Verity Newman". In the 2007 Christmas special "Voyage of the Damned", a dedication to Lambert was shown before the rolling of the end credits.

In April 2008, BBC Four aired an evening-long tribute to Lambert's work at the network, including a documentary and repeats of her most popular programmes. Also that year, the DVD release of The Time Meddler included the last commentary she made before her death, and a short documentary feature, Verity Lambert Obituary, described as "a concise essay looking back over the career of one of Doctor Who's co-creators."

For Doctor Who's fiftieth anniversary in 2013, the BBC commissioned a drama about the creation of the programme, entitled An Adventure in Space and Time. Lambert was played by actress Jessica Raine.

On 23 July 2014, a blue heritage plaque was unveiled by the Doctor Who Appreciation Society and the Riverside Trust, at Riverside Studios in Hammersmith in London. The plaque commemorates Lambert at Riverside and elsewhere. The plaque was unveiled by director Waris Hussein, her longtime friend and colleague, and the unveiling was attended by many friends and associates from over the years. When Riverside Studios was closed for redevelopment later that year, the plaque was placed into storage. In 2022 it was reinstalled on the exterior of the building and unveiled at a ceremony attended by many people from television, including actors Caroline Quentin, Larry Lamb, Carole Ann Ford and Anna Carteret, writer Lynda La Plante, former Doctor Who producers Philip Hinchcliffe and Steven Moffat, Ofcom chair Michael Grade, and former vision mixer Clive Doig.

The main family in the children's book series "The Lambert Histories" by Abiah Patterson are named after Verity Lambert.

== Selected filmography ==
- Doctor Who (1963–1965), producer
- Adam Adamant Lives! (1966–1967), producer
- Detective (1968), producer
- Take Three Girls (1969), producer
- W. Somerset Maugham (1969–1970), producer
- Budgie (1971), producer
- Between the Wars (1973), producer
- The Silver Mask (1973), producer
- A.D.A.M. (1973), producer
- Achilles Heel (1973), producer
- After Loch Lomond (1973), producer
- Shoulder to Shoulder: Sylvia Pankhurst (1974), producer
- The Naked Civil Servant (1975), executive producer
- Rock Follies (1976), executive producer
- Couples (1976), executive producer
- The Norman Conquests (1977), producer
- ITV Playhouse: Roadrunner (1977), executive producer
- The Sailor's Return (1978), executive producer
- Charlie Muffin (1979), executive producer
- Quatermass (1979), executive producer
- The Knowledge (1979), executive producer
- A Performance of Macbeth (1979), executive producer
- Fox: King Billy (1980), executive producer
- The Flame Trees of Thika (1981), executive producer
- Saigon: Year of the Cat (1983), producer
- The Nation's Health (1983), executive producer
- Reilly: Ace of Spies (1983), executive producer
- Widows (1983), executive producer
- Minder (1979–1984), executive producer
- Slayground (1983) (head of production)
- Morons from Outer Space (1985), executive producer
- Clockwise (1986), executive producer
- Link (1986), executive producer
- Evil Angels (A Cry in the Dark) (1988), producer
- American Roulette (1988), executive producer
- Coasting (1990), producer
- G.B.H. (1991), executive producer
- Sleepers (1991), executive producer
- Boys from the Bush (1991), producer
- So Haunt Me (1992)
- Eldorado (1992), producer
- Comics (1993), producer
- Class Act (1994), producer
- Heavy Weather (1995), producer
- Temp (1995), producer
- She's Out (1995), producer
- A Perfect State (1997), executive producer
- Jonathan Creek (1998–2004), producer
- The Cazalets (2001), producer
- Love Soup (2005–2007), producer
- Doctor Who: A Happy Ending (2006), script editor

Preceded by none	Doctor Who producer 1963–1965	Succeeded by John Wiles
