= Coasting (TV series) =

British drama television series

- Genre: Drama
- Created by: John Flanagan; Andrew McCulloch
- Based on: An idea by Anthony Bygraves; David Reilly
- Written by: Andrew McCulloch; Rod Beacham; John Flanagan; Kenward Hardy
- Directed by: David Tucker; Jeremy Silberston
- Starring: Peter Howitt; James Purefoy; Barrie Rutter; Sandy Hendrickse; Sue Jenkins; June Barrie; Abigail Cruttenden; Chris Sparkey
- Theme music composer: Peter Howitt; David Mackay
- Composer: David Mackay
- Country of origin: United Kingdom
- Original language: English
- No. of series: 1
- No. of episodes: 7

Production
- Executive producer: Sally Head
- Producer: Verity Lambert
- Production locations: Blackpool, Lancashire, England, UK
- Cinematography: Ken Morgan
- Editor: Jake Bernard
- Camera setup: Darren Miller
- Running time: 52 minutes
- Production companies: Cinema Verity; Granada Television

Original release
- Network: ITV
- Release: 26 October – 7 December 1990

Coasting is a British television drama miniseries, broadcast between 26 October and 7 December 1990. The seven-part series produced by Cinema Verity in association with Granada Television was broadcast on the ITV network, it starring Peter Howitt, James Purefoy, Barrie Rutter and Sue Jenkins.

== Cast ==
- Peter Howitt as Eddie Baker
- James Purefoy as Mike Baker
- Barrie Rutter as Danny Ryan
- Sue Jenkins as Julie Ryan
- Sandra Hendrickse as Theresa Ryan
- Joe Marlow as Seamus Ryan
- Natalie Butterworth, Suzanne Watt and Andrew Aspden as Danny and Julie’s Children
- June Barrie as Maria Ryan
- Judy Brooke as Jackie
- Abigail Cruttenden as Emma
- Chris Sparkey as Dorian

== Episodes ==
No.	Title	Directed by	Written by	Original release date
1	"Illuminations"	David Tucker	John Flanagan & Andrew McCulloch	26 October 1990
Eddie and Mike Baker arrive in Blackpool, on the run after a business deal goes wrong.
2	"Offshore"	Jeremy Silberston	John Flanagan & Andrew McCulloch	2 November 1990
Eddie is taken on as a manager of a new bar and disco.
3	"Blackpool Rock"	David Tucker	John Flanagan & Andrew McCulloch	9 November 1990
Eddie and Mike try managing a new rock band.
4	"Poetic Justice"	Jeremy Silberston	Kenward Hardy	16 November 1990
Eddie and Mike turn to their cousin Danny to help deal with a local villain.
5	"Press Stud"	Jeremy Silberston	Rod Beacham	23 November 1990
Mike gets involved with business tycoon Sir Howard Nash.
6	"Star Quality"	Jeremy Silberston	Rod Beacham	30 November 1990
Eddie and Stan go into business making personalised videos for tourists, while Mike lands a part in a TV commercial.
7	"Another Fine Mess"	David Tucker	John Flanagan & Andrew McCulloch	7 December 1990
During the annual Laurel and Hardy convention, Mike sets up an Italian restaurant and Eddie escorts an American woman round the Pleasure Beach, while their past may be about to finally catch up with them.

== Home media ==
To this date, the series was never to be released on DVD or VHS.
