= Paul Mendelson =

English scriptwriter

- Education: Cambridge University
- Occupation: Screenwriter
- Writing career
- Period: 1989–2006, 2010
- Genres: Comedy, drama, adventure, science fiction

Paul A. Mendelson is an English television, film and radio scriptwriter.

== Early life and career ==
He studied law at Cambridge University, where he gained a first class honours degree, after attending Newcastle Royal Grammar School, Glasgow High School and Harrow County Grammar. For a short time he ran the family law department of a small firm of city solicitors and then became an advertising copywriter for Ogilvy and Mather. Whilst working as creative director for a major London advertising agency, he began writing his first television series.

== Writing career ==
Mendelson's first hit television series was the BBC comedy May to December, which ran for 39 episodes, from 2 April 1989 to 27 May 1994 on BBC One, and was nominated for a BAFTA for Best Comedy. It starred Anton Rodgers as a widower solicitor in love with a much younger woman. Mendelson then created and wrote the BBC series So Haunt Me about a family home haunted by the ghost of a Jewish mother, played by Miriam Karlin. The show was produced by Cinema Verity for the BBC and originally aired from 1992 to 1994. Mendelson's most recent television situation comedy series in the UK is My Hero, which ran for six seasons on BBC One from February 2000 to September 2006. Based on his own experiences with testicular cancer, he wrote the acclaimed ITV play Losing It, starring Martin Clunes, for which he was nominated at the Televisual Awards for Best Writer in 2007. Having also survived prostate cancer, Mendelson is actively involved in cancer awareness charities and events.

== Current projects ==
Mendelson created the original idea and was creative consultant on the DreamWorks Animation/Fox series Neighbors from Hell. He writes original plays for BBC radio and adapts Joyce Porter's Chief Inspector Dover novels for BBC Radio 4. Mendelson is currently developing his BBC radio play A Meeting in Seville as a film.

== Writing credits ==
Production	Notes	Broadcaster
May to December	38 episodes (1989–1994)	BBC One
Pigsty	20 episodes (1990)	BBC One
So Haunt Me	19 episodes (1992–1994)	BBC One
Under the Moon	Television film (1995)	BBC One
My Hero	44 episodes (2000–2003, 2005–2006)	BBC One
Losing It	Television film (2006)	ITV
Neighbors from Hell	10 episodes (co-written with Paul Alexander, 2010)	TBS

== Awards and nominations ==
Year	Award	Work	Category	Result	Reference
1991	British Academy Television Awards	May to December (shared with Verity Lambert and Sydney Lotterby)	Best Comedy Series	Nominated	
2007	Televisual Awards	Losing It	Best Writing	Nominated	
