= Mind Games (2001 film) =

2001 British television film

- DVD cover
- Genre: Crime drama Thriller
- Created by: Lynda La Plante
- Starring: Fiona Shaw; Finbar Lynch; Colin Salmon; Chiwetel Ejiofor; Crispin Bonham-Carter
- Country of origin: United Kingdom
- Original language: English

Production
- Executive producer: Peter Richardson
- Producer: Liz Thorburn
- Running time: 120 minutes (w/ advertisements)

Original release
- Network: ITV
- Release: 6 January 2001

Mind Games was a one-off British crime drama broadcast on ITV on 6 January 2001, starring Fiona Shaw as the protagonist, Frances O'Neill, a former nun turned criminal profiler who is called in to investigate the horrific ritualistic murders of two middle-aged women. Written by Lynda La Plante and directed by Richard Standeven, the film gathered 6.91m viewers.

The DVD of the film was released on 23 July 2007. In the United States, the film aired on PBS during the Lynda La Plante season, which also included broadcasts of Prime Suspect, Trial & Retribution and Supply & Demand.

== Plot ==
A serial killer is at large, committing a series of horrific murders. Frances O'Neill (Fiona Shaw) draws on her training as a profiler and her strong religious background to try to get inside the killer's mind and track him down before he is able to strike again.

== Cast ==
- Fiona Shaw as DI Frances O'Neill
- Finbar Lynch as DCI Chris Medwynter
- Colin Salmon as DC Ricky Grover
- Chiwetel Ejiofor as Tyler Arnold
- Crispin Bonham-Carter as DC Terry Beale
- Ian Targett as DC Roger Ball
- Geoffrey Church as DC Matt Begg
- Tanya Ronder as DC Samantha Western
- Lisa Palfrey as DC Rebecca Longton
