= Sleepers (TV series) =

1991 British TV comedy-drama

- Acorn Media DVD cover
- Genre: Drama
- Written by: John Flanagan; Andrew McCulloch
- Directed by: Geoffrey Sax
- Starring: Nigel Havers; Warren Clarke; Michael Gough; David Calder
- Composers: David Dundas; Rick Wentworth
- Country of origin: United Kingdom
- Original language: English
- No. of series: 1
- No. of episodes: 4

Production
- Executive producers: Verity Lambert; Michael Wearing
- Producer: Caroline Gold
- Production locations: London, England, UK
- Cinematography: Remi Adefarasin
- Editor: Paul Tothill
- Running time: 55 minutes
- Production company: Cinema Verity

Original release
- Network: BBC2
- Release: 10 April – 1 May 1991

Sleepers is a 1991 four-part comedy-drama produced by Cinema Verity for the BBC, and that aired on BBC2 from 10 April to 1 May 1991, set around the period of Glasnost in the Soviet Union.

== Plot summary ==
In post-Glasnost Moscow, the KGB stumble across an old disused training facility recreating 1960s London. They soon discover that the purpose of the facility was to integrate KGB agents into British society. Two of these agents are still missing 25 years later. In fact, the two agents have become integrated into British society so well they themselves have forgotten the reason they were sent there in the first place. They are as British as the British as far as they are concerned. One of them, Jeremy Coward, has become a successful City financier with a string of girlfriends, a posh car and a studio apartment. The other, Albert Robinson, is a hard-working moderate trade unionist living in Eccles in the north of England, with a wife, children and a council house.

One day, Albert's daughter hears a strange noise coming from the attic. Looking for his daughter, Albert also hears the noise and discovers an old radio transmitter. He recognises the Russian radio transmission and suddenly realises that his old bosses are out to find him. Scared for his family, he goes away for a few days and manages to locate his associate.

The KGB also begin to take action to retrieve the two rogue agents and send Major Grishina—a darkly attractive female officer—to the United Kingdom in order to bring them back to the Soviet Union. Her arrival alerts the CIA and MI5 that something big must be happening for the KGB to send such a high-ranking officer to Britain. Her arrival also shakes up the Soviet representatives in the UK. The chief KGB officer in the UK is more decadent than the locals and is originally discovered watching an American baseball game on the TV.

The action unfolds as the KGB pursue the two errant agents across England—hotly pursued by the CIA and MI5.

== Cast ==
- Nigel Havers — Jeremy Coward / Sergei Rublev
- Warren Clarke — Albert Robinson / Vladimir Zelenski
- Michael Gough — Andrei Zorin
- Joanna Kanska — Nina Grishina (KGB)
- David Calder — Victor Chekhov (KGB)
- Candida Gubbins — Alison
- Annie Hulley — Sandra Robinson
- Denica Fairman — Georgina
- Richard Huw — Igor Kostov
- Christopher Rozycki — Oleg Petrovski
- Angus MacInnes — Bill Sullivan (CIA)
- Ricco Ross — Karl Richfield (CIA)
- Alan David — "K1" (MI-5)
- William Chubb — George Wetherby (MI-5)
