= Class Act (British TV series) =

1994 British TV series

- Genre: Comedy drama
- Written by: Michael Aitkins
- Starring: Joanna Lumley; James Gaddas; John Bowe; Nadine Garner; Richard Vernon
- Country of origin: United Kingdom
- Original language: English
- No. of series: 2
- No. of episodes: 14

Production
- Executive producers: Verity Lambert; Sharon Bloom (1995)
- Producer: Verity Lambert
- Running time: 50 minutes
- Production companies: Cinema Verity; Carlton Television

Original release
- Network: ITV
- Release: 7 April 1994 – 19 October 1995

Class Act is a British comedy-drama series produced by Verity Lambert. The series was broadcast by ITV, and ran for two series from 7 April 1994 to 19 October 1995. It starred Joanna Lumley, Nadine Garner, James Gaddas, Richard Vernon and John Bowe.

The series was broadcast by ABC in Australia starting in August 1997.

== Episodes ==
=== Series One ===
1. "Episode 1" (7 April 1994); director: Jane Howell
2. "Episode 2" (14 April 1994); director: Jane Howell
3. "Episode 3" (21 April 1994); director: Herbert Wise
4. "Episode 4" (28 April 1994); director: Jane Howell
5. "Episode 5" (5 May 1994); director: James Cellan Jones
6. "Episode 6" (12 May 1994); director: James Cellan Jones
7. "Episode 7" (19 May 1994); director: Herbert Wise

=== Series Two ===
1. "Episode 1" (7 September 1995); director: Herbert Wise
2. "Episode 2" (14 September 1995); director: Herbert Wise
3. "Episode 3" (21 September 1995); director: Herbert Wise
4. "Episode 4" (28 September 1995); director: Rick Stroud
5. "Episode 5" (5 October 1995); director: Rick Stroud
6. "Episode 6" (12 October 1995); director: Rick Stroud
7. "Episode 7" (19 October 1995); director: Rick Stroud

== DVD releases ==
The complete series of Class Act was released on DVD as a 4-disc box-set by the Network imprint on 2 August 2010.
