= She's Out (TV series) =

- Created by: Lynda La Plante
- Directed by: Ian Toynton
- Starring: Ann Mitchell; Linda Marlowe; Maureen Sweeney; Anna Patrick; Zoe Heyes; Indra Ové
- Country of origin: United Kingdom
- Original language: English
- No. of series: 1
- No. of episodes: 6

Production
- Producer: Verity Lambert
- Running time: 50 minutes
- Production company: Cinema Verity for Carlton Television

Original release
- Network: ITV
- Release: 6 March – 10 April 1995

Related
- Widows

She's Out is a British primetime television crime drama. The six-part series was produced by Cinema Verity for Carlton Television and screened on ITV in 1995. It was written by Lynda La Plante as a sequel to her 1980s series, Widows, She's Out takes up the story of the central character, Dolly Rawlins, ten years after the events of the previous series. Ann Mitchell, who reprised her role as Dolly, and Kate Williams, who played Audrey Withey, were the only cast members from the original series to appear in She's Out. The executive producer for the series was Verity Lambert and the series was directed by Ian Toynton, both of whom had worked on the original series.

It begins with Dolly Rawlins' release from prison after serving a five-year sentence for the murder of Harry, her husband. She teams up with several other parolees and make plans to stage a train robbery on horseback. Dolly's new companions in crime were fellow former inmates, brothel madam Ester Freeman (Linda Marlowe), Julia Lawson (Anna Patrick), a doctor who sold prescriptions to finance her heroin habit, arms dealer and fence Gloria Radford (Maureen Sweeney), prostitute Connie Stephens (Zoe Heyes), Angela Dunn (Indra Ové), a young woman embroiled in Ester's vice schemes and forger Kathleen O'Reilly (Maggie McCarthy).

The series was released on Region 2 DVD.

== Cast ==
- Ann Mitchell as Dolly Rawlins
- Linda Marlowe as Ester Freeman
- Maureen Sweeney as Gloria Radford
- Anna Patrick as Julia Lawson
- Zoe Heyes as Connie Stephens
- Indra Ové as Angela Dunn
- Maggie McCarthy as Kathleen O'Reilly
- Adrian Rawlins as D.S. Mike Withey
- Kate Williams as Audrey Withey
- Hugh Quarshie as D.C.I. Ron Craigh
- Douglas McFerran as D.S. John Palmer
- Sophie Heyman as Susan Withey
- Terence Beesley as Jim Douglas
- Huggy Leaver as Eddie Radford
- Richard Lintern as John Maynard
- Buffy Davis as Norma Walker
- Antony Webb as Jimmy Donaldson

== Episodes ==
No.	Title	Directed by	Written by	Original release date
1	"Episode 1"	Ian Toynton	Lynda La Plante	6 March 1995
Dolly Rawlins has served her eight years and is due for her release from Holloway Prison. Ester Freeman has a plan to get the money from the diamonds Dolly hid away after the nightclub robbery and she invites other ex-convicts to the Grange Health Farm to get them in on the plan. Audrey Withey, Shirley Miller's mother, blames Dolly for Shirley's death during the raid, and tells her son, D.S. Mike Withey, to try to get her for the diamond robbery, but later tells him she has the diamonds herself. Dolly tells the women that her dream is to build a home for unwanted children and battered wives. Ester makes Dolly an offer to buy the house – and Dolly contacts the fence.
2	"Episode 2"	Ian Toynton	Lynda La Plante	13 March 1995
Dolly buys the house from Ester and arranges to meet the fence, Jimmy Donaldson, but unknown to her, the police are listening in. Dolly applies to get permission to make the Grange Health Farm into a children's home. She finds out that Ester used to run it as a brothel. Ester and Angela set out to collect the diamonds, but then Dolly finds out that Donaldson should be in prison. They rush to his house and escape the police, but end up running down Donaldson and Dolly takes the diamonds from him. As Ester is packing to leave, Dolly walks in and shows them the diamonds, that are supposedly worth £6,000,000.
3	"Episode 3"	Ian Toynton	Lynda La Plante	20 March 1995
Dolly goes to see an old friend with the diamonds and he tells her that they are fakes he made for someone. Dolly visits Audrey, who tells her that she got £500,000 for the diamonds, most of which was spent on a villa in Spain. Dolly is annoyed and demands that Audrey get her the money. Social services visit the manor, but Dolly isn't there, and they find the rest of the women cavorting half-naked in the sauna and showers. Dolly tells the girls that the diamonds are fakes, but they will have to rely on the children's home working out, but then her application is later turned down. Ester leaves when she realises there will be no money, but is then attacked in a parking lot. Connie's boyfriend turns up and starts looking for her. Ester returns to the manor and Dolly goes out in the woods and finds Connie's boyfriend dead. She gets an idea for a new robbery – on the mail train.
4	"Episode 4"	Ian Toynton	Lynda La Plante	27 March 1995
Dolly begins to plan her next robbery. She asks Julia to find out where the nearest stable is and asks Connie to get friendly with the man at the railway station. Dolly and Julia take Connie's boyfriend's body to the graveyard and bury him under a grave prepared for the next day, while Ester and Gloria take the guns to be fenced. The police turn up at the manor and arrest Kathleen when she makes a run for it, but they don't find anything on the others. Dolly reveals to the women that she's planning a robbery and that they need to do it on horseback.
5	"Episode 5"	Ian Toynton	Lynda La Plante	3 April 1995
The women begin riding lessons and some of them get information on the railway and its security system. Dolly uses Shirley's brother, D.S. Mike Withey, to get information on the security and running of the mail train. Gloria and Connie dig out the cesspit, as they are waiting for the lime to arrive. Dolly gets information off Mike that the mail train will change its route in three weeks, meaning that the robbery will have to take place within that time. Dolly outlines the plan to them and tells them that the money on the mail train will be between £30,000,000 and £40,000,000. Each of them is nervous, but they all decide to stay in.
6	"Episode 6"	Ian Toynton	Lynda La Plante	10 April 1995
Dolly finds out that the train will only be running on the same route only once more, meaning they only have the one chance the next day. They run over the plan again and make sure that everything is ready. The following night, they set out to commit the robbery. As they are taking out the money, the carriage starts to slip down into the lake and Connie gets trapped inside. Dolly gets back inside and helps Connie out. They get back to the house and quickly clear up and hide the money. When the police turn up, they find nothing when they search. D.I. Craig later arrives with complaints about the bill for repairs on the house. Ester finds a passport and tickets in Dolly's bedroom and overhears her agreeing to make a deal for half the money, but she thinks Dolly is making a deal with the police about the robbery. She retrieves a hidden handgun and shoots Dolly, killing her in front of D.I. Craig, leading to the remaining four women being arrested.
