= Comics (British TV series) =

- Genre: Thriller
- Written by: Lynda La Plante
- Directed by: Diarmuid Lawrence
- Starring: Tim Guinee; Danny Webb; Lennie James; Michelle Fairley; Frank Grimes; Christopher Fulford; Graham Fellows; Jenny Galloway; Alex Norton
- Opening theme: "Stay With Me Baby" — Ruby Turner
- Composer: Richard Hartley
- Country of origin: United Kingdom
- Original language: English
- No. of series: 1
- No. of episodes: 2

Production
- Executive producer: Verity Lambert
- Producer: Selwyn Roberts
- Cinematography: Robin Vidgeon
- Editor: Don Fairservice
- Running time: 110 minutes
- Production company: Cinema Verity

Original release
- Network: Channel 4
- Release: 6 June – 7 June 1993

Comics is a two-part British television miniseries, written and created by Lynda La Plante, that broadcast on Channel 4 between 6 and 7 June 1993. Adapted from La Plante's novel of the same name, the series stars Tim Guinee as Johnny Lazar, a down-and-out American comedian who tries to regain his status as an international superstar by embarking on a tour of working men's clubs and universities in England. But on his first night, Johnny is witness to a gangland murder and finds himself having to go on the run as he becomes the target of hit men who want to eliminate any chance of them being identified.

The series also stars Danny Webb as Lazar's agent, Brian Duffield; Lennie James as Delroy Smith, a local delinquent whom the police suspect committed the murder; and Michelle Fairley as Nula O'Reilly, Duffield's girlfriend and a fellow comic who grows close to Johnny. The series was directed by Diarmuid Lawrence, produced by Verity Lambert via her own production company, Cinema Verity, and features a number of notable cameo appearances, including the likes of Michael Aspel and The Wildhearts. Comic material used in the series was co-written by Jenny Eclair. The complete series was released on DVD via Simply Media on 21 May 2018.

== Cast ==
- Tim Guinee as Johnny Lazar
- Danny Webb as Brian Duffield
- Lennie James as Delroy Smith
- Michelle Fairley as Nula O'Reilly
- Frank Grimes as D.C.I. Kelly
- Christopher Fulford as Nigel Perfect
- Graham Fellows as Graham Redcar
- Jenny Galloway as Rebecca
- Alex Norton as Haggis
- Terry O'Neill as Peter Moreno
- Stephen Greif as Anthony Fratelli
- Joe Dixon as Harper Knowles
- Steve Nicolson as D.I. Cloaks
- Colin Wyatt as D.I. Shawley
- Johanna Benyon as Felix
- Lou Hirsch as Morris Feldman
- Michael Gardiner as Supt. Jackson
- Cassandra Holliday as Lucinda
- Richard Ridings as Tommy Karr
- Kevin Williams as Alex Cornwall

== Episodes ==
| No. overall | No. in series | Title | Directed by | Written by | Original release date |
|---|---|---|---|---|---|
| 1 | 1 | "Part 1" | Diarmuid Lawrence | Lynda La Plante | 6 June 1993 |
After making a car-crash appearance on one of the country's most watched chat shows, down and out American comedian Johnny Lazar (Tim Guinee) is given one last chance of redemption by his agent Morris Feldmann (Lou Hirsch), who secures him a twelve-week tour of working men's clubs and universities in the UK under the watchful eye of major talent scout Brian Duffield (Danny Webb). But on his first night in the UK, Johnny is witness to a gangland hit in Picadilly Circus. Johnny initially tries to avoid becoming embroiled in the manhunt for the killer, but when the police issue an E-fit matching his description, his conscience begins to get the better of him. And when one of his fellow comedians, Nigel Perfect (Christopher Fulford) is murdered in a case of mistaken identity, Johnny decides to do the right thing by handing himself into the police. Unfortunately for them, Johnny's evidence puts the case against their prime suspect, Delroy Smith (Lennie James) in severe jeopardy.
| 2 | 2 | "Part 2" | Diarmuid Lawrence | Lynda La Plante | 7 June 1993 |
Fratelli (Stephen Greif) orders Moreno (Terry O'Neill) to step up the campaign to silence Johnny. Delroy offers to chauffeur Johnny during a newly booked sixteen-night tour of the UK in his brand new £12,000 Nissan. But events take a frightening turn when Moreno tails Johnny from a gig at Hotspots and tries to run him off the road. Only some skilled driving from Haggis (Alex Norton) manages to save the day, and he leaps to the rescue once again by offering to loan Johnny and Delroy a hearse for them to drive up to Scotland for the first night of the impending tour. Whilst in Scotland, the events of Johnny's childhood begin to overwhelm him, much to the point that he suffers somewhat of a breakdown after spending the night with Nula (Michelle Fairley). Delroy, meanwhile, has arranged for Haggis to ship a £15,000 Harley up from London to Scotland to surprise Johnny after he comes off stage. Johnny is delighted, unaware that Moreno has tracked the shipment and is hot on his tail.

== Releases ==
Comics was released on DVD in 2018 by Simply Media.
