= Lesley Dunlop =

English actress (born 1956)

- Born: Lesley Jane Dunlop; 10 March 1956 (age 70); Newcastle upon Tyne, Northumberland, England
- Occupation: Actress
- Television: Emmerdale
- Spouses: Christopher Guard (divorced); Chris Chittell (m. 2016)
- Children: 2

Lesley Jane Dunlop (born 10 March 1956) is an English actress, known for her role as Brenda Walker in the ITV soap opera Emmerdale (2008–2025). Her other roles include Anna Kirkwall in Where the Heart Is and Zoë Angell in May to December.

== Career ==
Daughter of television writer Pat Dunlop, she began her career as a child actress in the 1970s featuring in a BBC version of the classic A Little Princess and as Lydia Holly in the ITV adaptation of South Riding. She studied at the Arts Educational Schools Her transition to adult roles began by playing Lizzie Hexam in a BBC version of Charles Dickens' Our Mutual Friend in 1976 and featuring in the very first series of the long-running hospital drama Angels. Dunlop was cast alongside Diana Rigg and Elizabeth Taylor in the film version of Stephen Sondheim's A Little Night Music (1977), and appeared in Roman Polanski's Tess (1979). The following year she played Nora, the nurse who is at first terrified by The Elephant Man and then befriends John Hurt's character in David Lynch's 1980 Oscar nominated film. She also appeared in the horror anthology film The Monster Club (1981) as Luna.

Throughout this time and indeed throughout her career, she has regularly appeared on British TV including Murder Most English (1977), Red Shift (1977) and Deadly Game, Eileen Shaw in The Sweeney episode "Taste of Fear" (1982), as well as two guest appearances in Doctor Who, playing roles in "Frontios" in 1984 and "The Happiness Patrol" in 1988. She starred opposite Oliver Tobias in Smuggler (1981), and Peter Ustinov in the TV film Thirteen at Dinner (1985). In 1986, she appeared as the pregnant Pattie in the TV version of the Alan Ayckbourn play Seasons Greetings. In the 1990s she starred in the long-running BBC sitcom May to December as Zoe Callender alongside on-screen husband Anton Rodgers, replacing Eve Matheson in the role from the series two Christmas special onwards.

In 1995, Dunlop starred in the two part Gurinder Chadha directed drama Rich Deceiver as Ellie Freeman, a Liverpudlian housewife who secretly wins the pools and uses the money to covertly help her husband's career. She also starred in the ITV series Wokenwell (1997) and the same year was in the BBC serial The Phoenix and the Carpet. She appeared in a long-running series of television adverts for Kleenex directed by Mike Leigh and played Moira Pridwell in "Something to Treasure," S4:E1 of "Hetty Wainthropp Investigates" (1998). In 2000, Dunlop joined the cast of the ITV series Where the Heart Is playing Anna Kirkwall. Since 2008, she has played the role of Brenda Walker in the ITV soap opera Emmerdale. In 2013, after Brenda was diagnosed with a brain tumour, Dunlop shaved her head especially for the part. In 2024, it was announced that Dunlop would be quitting her role as Brenda.

In 2026 she appeared in the episode "Cannes" of The Good Ship Murder celebrating a year at sea with the cruise ship as a passenger.

== Personal life ==
Dunlop has two daughters, Rosie and Daisy Guard, both with actor Christopher Guard. In 2016, she married Emmerdale co-star Chris Chittell, who plays Eric Pollard.

== Awards and nominations ==
| Year | Award | Category | Result | Ref. |
|---|---|---|---|---|
| 2012 | Inside Soap Awards | Funniest Female | Nominated | |
| 2013 | Inside Soap Awards | Best Actress | Shortlisted | |
| 2014 | 19th National Television Awards | Serial Drama Performance | Longlisted | |
