= So Haunt Me =

British TV sitcom (BBC1, 1992–94)

- Genre: Sitcom
- Created by: Paul Mendelson
- Written by: Paul Mendelson
- Directed by: John Stroud; Sylvie Boden
- Starring: Miriam Karlin; George Costigan; Tessa Peake-Jones; Laura Howard; Jeremy Green
- Composer: Rolfe Kent
- Country of origin: United Kingdom
- Original language: English
- No. of series: 3
- No. of episodes: 19

Production
- Executive producer: Verity Lambert
- Running time: 30 minutes
- Production company: Cinema Verity

Original release
- Network: BBC1
- Release: 23 February 1992 – 6 February 1994

So Haunt Me is a British television sitcom about a family that moves into a home occupied by the ghost of its previous resident, a middle-aged Jewish mother. The show was created by Paul Mendelson, who also created the successful sitcoms May to December and My Hero. So Haunt Me was produced by Cinema Verity for the BBC, and aired on BBC1 as 18 half-hour episodes in three series and one special from February 1992 to February 1994.

== Plot summary ==
Peter Rokeby loses his job as advertising copywriter, and resolves to become a freelance writer. Owing to this change in circumstances, he and his wife Sally move with their children Tammy and David into a more modest home in Meadow Road, Willesden. The family soon finds that the ghost of a previous owner, Yetta Feldman, still occupies the residence, and has been scaring occupants away for years. Yetta is a stereotypical interfering, middle-aged Jewish mother who died suddenly after choking on a chicken bone in some chicken soup. While both Sally and David can both see and speak to their ghost, Peter, much to his frustration, initially cannot. The family agrees to help Yetta find her grown-up daughter Carole ("Carol-with-an-E").

== Cast ==
=== Main Cast ===
Actor	Character	Episodes
Miriam Karlin	Yetta Feldman	19
George Costigan	Peter Rokeby	19
Tessa Peake-Jones	Sally Rokeby	19
Laura Howard (credited as Laura Simmons in series 1)	Tammy Rokeby	19
Jeremy Green	David Rokeby	18

=== Notable Recurring Cast ===
Actor	Character	Episodes
David Graham	Mr Bloom	13
Julia Deakin	Carole Dawlish	8
Thelma Ruby	Dolly Finkel	7
Trevor Byfield	Jack Dawlish	5
Philip McGough	Piers	5
Tanya Moodie	Elspeth	4
Jez Butterworth	Jhon	2
Bryan Pringle	Arnold	1
Arthur White	1st Removal man	1
Hugo Speer	Terry	1
Maggie Steed	Mrs Pettigrew	1

== Episodes ==
All episodes were written by series creator Paul Mendelson, credited as "Paul A Mendelson".

=== Series overview ===
Series	Episodes	Originally released	
Series	Episodes	First released	Last released
1	6	23 February 1992	29 March 1992
Special		20 December 1992	
2	6	10 January 1993	14 February 1993
3	6	2 January 1994	6 February 1994

=== Series 1 (1992) ===
No. overall	No. in series	Title	Directed by	Original release date
1	1	"A Haunted House"	John Stroud	23 February 1992
Recently made redundant from his job in advertising, Peter Rokeby moves, with his wife Sally, teen-aged daughter Tammy, little son David and their dog to a much smaller house, which smells of chicken soup. Hearing noises in the night Sally investigates and meets the ghost of Yetta Feldman, a Jewish former occupant of the house who choked to death on a chicken bone twenty-one years earlier, and has seen off seventeen previous sets of house-holders. Pete and Tammy cannot see Yetta and think that Sally is hallucinating after a tiring day - but David can.
2	2	"Ghost in Residence"	John Stroud	1 March 1992
After speaking to Mr Bloom from next door Peter realises that the ghostly Yetta does exist and starts seeing her, but when he and Sally decide to ignore her she fades away. However when Bunty, Sally's snobbish and disapproving mother turns up Yetta's reappearance comes in handy for getting rid of her. When Bunty has gone Yetta and Mr Bloom explain to the Rokebys that Carole, Yetta's daughter, ran off with her boyfriend just before Yetta's death and Yetta's ghost will only be able to rest in peace after Carole has been located for a reconciliation.
3	3	"The Deadline"	John Stroud	8 March 1992
When shoe manufacturer Kevin Sandy calls on Peter requesting an advertising slogan for his firm Yetta proves her worth with her invisible presence overhearing Sandy's gripes and presenting Peter with a solution. David brings his friends home to meet his 'Auntie Yetta', giving them a hair-raising experience but Tammy, as the one family member who cannot see Yetta, is not happy.
4	4	"Unemployment"	John Stroud	15 March 1992
Yetta tells the Rokebys that she will depart if Carole is found, so they bring in a young rabbi to help. Yetta recalls him from his childhood and to Peter's annoyance they discuss old times. Tammy is still feeling left out of things as Yetta criticizes her boyfriend, but Sally tells Peter that she wants Yetta to stay as she regards her as a confidante.
5	5	"Yetta's Birthday"	John Stroud	22 March 1992
Sally is pregnant and confides in Yetta, who breaks the news gently to Peter. Peter's friend Jim arrives from New York. He is engaged to be married and Sally quizzes him like a Jewish mother. Ultimately, though, he has inadvertently found Carole for them, along with the band member, or 'hooligan' to quote Yetta, with whom she ran off all those years ago.
6	6	"A Long Lost Daughter"	John Stroud	29 March 1992
Posing as a documentary maker and his P.A. the Rokebys call on pop star turned music agent Jack Dawlish and his wife - Carole. Ultimately they explain their true reason for visiting and persuade Carole to come home with them where she meets Yetta and tells her that she is pregnant. Yetta is delighted and her ghost seemingly laid to rest for she disappears, much to Peter's great relief, though David and Sally are disappointed.

=== Christmas special (1992) ===
No.	Title	Directed by	Original release date
7	"Christmas Special"	John Stroud	20 December 1992
Sally has given birth to baby Daisy, and Yetta has returned to watch over her. At Christmas the Rokebys invite gloomy Mr Rose and Jack and Carole Dawlish with their baby, Sam, for dinner, though Yetta's efforts to soothe Sam to sleep via levitation and the supposed presence of some of her ghostly friends do not endear her to the company. However, despite his supposed antipathy to his dead mother-in-law Jack has arranged a Christmas treat for her, a visit from her singing brother-in-law Greville whom he has flown in from Miami.

=== Series 2 (1993) ===
No. overall	No. in series	Title	Directed by	Original release date
8	1	"A New Client"	John Stroud	10 January 1993
With an extra mouth to feed Peter needs all the work he can get, and when client Max Rodwell hires him to publicize his microwave business he throws himself into the campaign whole-heartedly. However, it also means that he is neglecting his family, and it is down to Yetta to help him put his priorities in order.
9	2	"Pete's Mother"	John Stroud	17 January 1993
Peter's bossy mother Violet and her meek husband Stan have come down to visit, and Violet is instantly critical of the house and what she considers to be its dirty, untidy condition. Yetta is outraged and not for the first time has to show an interfering mother who is the real lady of the house. Tammy, who still cannot see Yetta and regards her family as mad, desperately phones around her friends in the hope that she can have a break from the household.
10	2	"Mid-Death Crisis"	John Stroud	24 January 1993
When Peter is seen wining and dining a young lady, business associate Vic Lewis, Sally misinterprets this and, having read his diary and noted that he has bought a bike, wrongly fears that he is leaving her for a younger woman. She turns to Yetta for advice which is not a good idea, even though the truth is eventually told to her.
11	4	"I Want to Be Alone"	John Stroud	31 January 1993
Pete has sold an advert to a film company, but time is running out to find a location, so it is agreed that it should be filmed in the Rokebys' house with David in a starring role. Yetta is thrilled as she sees it as her chance to become Yetta Garbo, but is annoyed when her cousin Dolly Finkel arrives and gets herself into the advert instead.
12	5	"The Exorcist"	John Stroud	7 February 1993
After considering selling the house to escape Yetta, Peter decides instead to bring in medium Mrs Pettigrew to hold a seance at which Yetta's late husband will apparently present himself and announce that he wants her to join him on the other side. However, when information unknown to Peter starts to filter through, he wonders if Yetta has beaten him at his own game. Tammy goes into a cleaning frenzy after Peter tries to restrict the amount of times when she can see her latest boyfriend.
12	6	"A Haunting We Will Go"	John Stroud	14 February 1993
Jack persuades Peter that, instead of fleeing from Yetta, he should capitalize on her presence and invites journalist Elly Jones round to do a story about Yetta which will make him enough money to move out. However Peter has failed to see that the publicity may not be at all welcome to his family, and once more it is Yetta who puts things into perspective for him.

=== Series 3 (1994) ===
No. overall	No. in series	Title	Directed by	Original release date
14	1	"A Writer's Life"	Sylvie Boden	2 January 1994
Tammy returns from a holiday in France to find that Peter is having more problems getting work. Eventually he is hired by an agency advertising food products but is unsure as to whether he wants to stay. Yetta, meanwhile, addresses a tribunal in Limbo to persuade them to let her stay at the Rokebys.
15	2	"A New Life"	Sylvie Boden	9 January 1994
Peter is working for Tark, short for Tarquin, on behalf of his advertising agency, but when he has to sell a Japanese chocolate bar which contains whale, he has to let his principles get the better of him. Sally, meanwhile, is embarking on a Marriage Guidance course and having to look to her own family for guidance on filling in the questionnaire.
16	3	"The Star Ad"	Sylvie Boden	16 January 1994
In line with the results of her Marriage Guidance course Sally believes that she should be a more permissive parent, and allows Tammy to date a biker called Terry. In fact things become so liberal that Peter decides that he, too, wants to be a biker, and again it is down to Yetta to make everybody see sense.
17	4	"A Mother and Her Mate"	Sylvie Boden	23 January 1994
Violet, Peter's mother, has not long been a widow and stuns Peter by telling him that she is thinking of marrying Arnold, a man whom in the past she appeared to dislike, and encouraged Peter to do the same. Mr Bloom from next door is thinking of marrying Yetta's cousin Dolly Finkel. Neither Peter nor Yetta are happy and Sally has to bring her Marriage Guidance skills to play in to try to resolve the situation.
18	5	"The Stake Out"	Sylvie Boden	30 January 1994
Peter is having trouble coming up with an idea for his latest job, promoting English tourism, and, after Carole has had a row with Jack, she becomes involved with the project. However, things get out of hand with a male and female police officer staking out the house and Yetta trying to fix them up with each other.
19	6	"Wedding Preparations"	Sylvie Boden	6 February 1994
After Sally has pressurised him into it Peter asks Tark for a raise, only to be told that it is on the cards to send him and the family to the firm's branch in Russia. Tammy and Dolly's son Lawrence are in love, though Tammy is upset to hear Dolly say they are ill-matched because of their different religions. Yetta is put out because Mr Bloom and Dolly are getting married but have not invited her to the wedding. Fortunately the reception is at the Rokebys', so Yetta can put on her best appearance and rectify everything.

== Release ==
The show has not been released on VHS or DVD in the UK, and there are no known plans for a home release.
