= Civvies (TV series) =

- Genre: Crime drama Thriller
- Written by: Lynda La Plante
- Directed by: Karl Francis
- Starring: Jason Isaacs; Elizabeth Rider; Caleb Lloyd; Bobby Coombes; Lennie James; Eddie O'Connell; Seamus O'Neill; Peter Howitt; Peter O'Toole
- Country of origin: United Kingdom
- Original language: English
- No. of series: 1
- No. of episodes: 6

Production
- Executive producer: Lynda La Plante
- Producer: Ruth Caleb
- Production location: United Kingdom
- Running time: 50 minutes
- Production company: BBC Wales

Original release
- Network: BBC1
- Release: 22 September – 27 October 1992

Civvies is a six-part thriller first broadcast on BBC1 from 22 September to 27 October 1992. The series was written by Lynda La Plante - her first writing contribution for the BBC, after being poached by the BBC following the success of Prime Suspect. The series focuses on Frank Dillon (Jason Isaacs), a former Army soldier who finds life outside the army tougher than being in it - and slowly falls under the power of east end gangster Barry Newman (Peter O'Toole), who is looking to hire a trained hitman. The complete series was released on DVD on 3 June 2013 by Acorn Media UK.

== Plot ==
Reconciling the danger and excitement of serving in the elite British Parachute Regiment with life back home with his family does not prove simple for Frank Dillon. An impulsive and aggressive man, he is aware that his pay-off from the army isn't sufficient to secure his future but, like his friends, he struggles to find stable employment elsewhere. With no one prepared to take a chance on him, Frank may be powerless to resist the approaches of Barry Newman, an East End gangster who could certainly find a use for a trained killer.

== Cast ==
- Jason Isaacs as Frank Dillon
- Elizabeth Rider as Suzie Dillon
- Caleb Lloyd as Kenny Dillon
- Bobby Coombes as Phil Dillon
- Lennie James as Cliff Morgan
- Eddie O'Connell as Jimmy Hammond
- Seamus O'Neill as Harry Travers
- Peter Howitt as Steve Harris
- Peter O'Toole as Barry Newman
- David J. Nichols as Johnny Blair
- Shirley Stelfox as Helen Bunning
- Bhasker Patel as Marway
- John H. Francis as Taffy Davies
- Gareth Marks as Wally Simpkins

== Locations ==
An entrance gate at the Imperial War Museum Duxford in Cambridgeshire stood in for the gates of Depot Para, then the barracks and training facility for the Parachute Regiment at Aldershot in Hampshire. A Douglas C-47 Skytrain from the museum's collection was parked at the gates during filming to replicate the gate guardian at Depot Para in Aldershot.

== Episodes ==
No.	Title	Directed by	Written by	British air date	UK viewers (million)
1	"Frank"	Karl Francis	Lynda La Plante	22 September 1992	N/A
Some time after narrowly avoiding being killed by an IRA bomb in a pub while serving in Northern Ireland, Sgt Frank Dillon decides after 15 years of service in the British Army that he has had enough, as he wants to see his two boys grow up. He is cashiered to the value of £5000 and leaves the Parachute Regiment barracks for the last time.
2	"Taffy"	Karl Francis	Lynda La Plante	29 September 1992	N/A
Taffy, who has been suffering from flashbacks, has been unable to get a nights sleep for quite some time - and it is starting to affect his sanity, and his ability to get a job. He calls Frank and tells him his woes, but Frank seems vacant and uncaring. Taffy later returns home to find bailiffs clearing out his house, a situation which he doesn't help by threatening them and then smashing things up so they can't take them.
3	"Steve"	Karl Francis	Lynda La Plante	6 October 1992	N/A
Frank, Jimmy, Steve and Cliff travel up to Scotland where they meet up with Harry, who introduces them to Tony Malone, a former Military Policeman-Sergeant who is now the estate owner's assistant gamekeeper. Harry is upset at seeing Steve among the group, labeling him as a "drunken prat," a moniker which he manages to live up to as he more or less immediately gets drunk in the hotel bar. While there, the hotel owner regails them with a tale of how a handsome bounty of £3000 will be paid to anyone who disposes Malone. Meanwhile, both Frank and Steve take a shine to Sissy, the estate's attractive restaurant manager. At one point, Frank and Sissy make love in an empty room at the hotel. Seething with jealousy, Steve attempts to rape Sissy, but she manages to fight back despite being gravely injured. Steve is left in tears, devastated for failing to win Sissy's heart. The squad carry on with their patrol of the estate. They manage to stave off the poachers terrorizing the estate, with Malone getting injured in the process. Thereafter, Frank and Malone fight; Malone initially gets the upper hand, but is eventually beaten by Frank. Malone later apologizes to Frank and admits that a security lapse prior to the bombing of the bar back at Northern Ireland was not his fault. Nonetheless, the squad drive off back to the hotel without saying anything to him. Sissy later confides to Frank that she did not report Steve to the police as she felt very sorry for his hopeless condition as a near mute. Frank, in turn, spoke a bit of his experiences in Northern Ireland as well as the pride of having his boys around, that he would watch their backs as they watch his. Sissy happens to know that Frank is married with kids and remarks that they cannot have a side relationship; he bids her goodbye. Before leaving the estate, Frank confronts Steve and angrily gives him his lump sum, a generous one since Steve managed to partially help the group with some recon against the poachers. Upon being abandoned by the squad, Steve sadly hitchhikes to a nearby lake. There, through the sunset, he spots a stag, hoping to score his kill with a scoped hunting rifle he brought. However, he turns the gun on himself, instead, and dies by suicide.
4	"Jimmy"	Karl Francis	Lynda La Plante	13 October 1992	N/A
Frank and Jimmy clear Steve's stuff out of Frank's spare room, which amounts to little more than a single bin bag, a few items of clothing, and a lot of empty bottles. Frank muses over whether he did the right thing by abandoning him, but Jimmy points out that Steve was bound to die sooner or later, if not from the suicide then he would have drunk himself to death, or someone else would have killed him.
5	"Harry"	Karl Francis	Lynda La Plante	20 October 1992	N/A
Stag Security are enjoying a bit of a boom period, so much so that Frank throws a party with the duel intention of celebrating their success, and recruiting more ex servicemen to work for them. All is going well, until Cliff puts "Great balls of fire" on the record player, which causes Frank to have a horrendous and graphic flashback to the night of the bombing.
6	"Cliff"	Karl Francis	Lynda La Plante	27 October 1992	N/A
Cliff and Harry arrive to pick up the payroll from a laundry, completely unaware that their movements are being watched by a man across the street. Frank worriedly checks the local newspaper to see if there are any reports about the murder he and Harry committed.
