= Elizabeth Jane Howard =

English novelist

Elizabeth Jane Howard CBE FRSL
- Born: 26 March 1923; London, England, UK
- Died: 2 January 2014 (aged 90); Bungay, Suffolk, England, UK
- Occupation: Writer
- Spouses: Peter Scott (m. 1942; div. 1951) James Douglas-Henry (m. 1958; div. 1964) Kingsley Amis (m. 1965; div. 1983)
- Children: 1
- Writing career
- Genres: Fiction, non-fiction

Elizabeth Jane Howard CBE FRSL (26 March 1923 – 2 January 2014), was an English novelist. She wrote 15 novels, including the best-selling series The Cazalet Chronicle.

== Early life ==
Howard's father was Major David Liddon Howard MC (1896–1958), a timber merchant who followed the work of his own father, Alexander Liddon Howard (1863–1946). Her mother was Katharine Margaret Somervell (1895–1975), a dancer with Sergei Diaghilev's Ballets Russes and daughter of composer Sir Arthur Somervell. (Howard's brother, Colin, lived with her and her third husband, Kingsley Amis, for 17 years.) Mostly educated at home, Howard briefly attended Francis Holland School before attending domestic-science college at Ebury Street and secretarial college in central London.

== Career ==
Howard worked briefly as an actress in provincial repertory and occasionally as a model before her writing career, which began in 1947.

The Beautiful Visit (1950), Howard's first novel, was described as "distinctive, self-assured and remarkably sensual". It won the John Llewellyn Rhys Prize in 1951 for best novel by a writer under 30. She next collaborated with Robert Aickman, writing three of the six short stories in the collection We Are for the Dark (1951).

Her second novel, The Long View (1956), describes a marriage in reverse chronology; Angela Lambert remarked, "Why The Long View isn't recognised as one of the great novels of the 20th century I will never know."

Howard published five additional novels before she embarked on her best known work, the five-volume Cazalet Chronicle. As Artemis Cooper describes it: “Jane had two ideas, and could not decide which to embark on; so she invited her stepson Martin [Amis] round for a drink to ask his advice. One idea was an updated version of Sense and Sensibility … the other was a three-volume family saga … Martin said immediately, “Do that one.”

The Chronicle was a family saga "about the ways in which English life changed during the war years, particularly for women." It follows three generations of a middle-class English family and drew heavily from Howard's own life and memories. The first four volumes, The Light Years, Marking Time, Confusion, and Casting Off, were published from 1990 to 1995. Howard wrote the fifth, All Change (2013), in one year; it was her final novel. Millions of copies of the Cazalet Chronicle have been sold worldwide, and the novels remain in print ten years after her death.

The Light Years and Marking Time were serialised by Cinema Verity for BBC Television as The Cazalets in 2001. A BBC Radio 4 version in 45 episodes was also broadcast from 2012.

Howard wrote the screenplay for the 1989 movie Getting It Right, directed by Randal Kleiser, based on her 1982 novel of the same name. She also co-wrote an episode of the popular series Upstairs, Downstairs.

She wrote a book of short stories, Mr. Wrong (1975), and edited two anthologies, including The Lover's Companion (1978).

== Autobiography and biographies ==
Howard's autobiography, Slipstream, was published in 2002.

A biography, entitled Elizabeth Jane Howard: A Dangerous Innocence by Artemis Cooper, was published by John Murray in 2017. A reviewer said it was "strongest in the case it makes for the virtues of Howard's fiction".

== Personal life ==
Howard was age 19 when she married conservationist Sir Peter Scott, the only child of Antarctic explorer Captain Robert Falcon Scott and the sculptor Kathleen Bruce, in 1942; they had a daughter, Nicola. Howard left Scott in 1946 to become a writer, and they were divorced in 1951. In 1955, she fell in love with the writer Arthur Koestler. Howard became pregnant while with Koestler and had an abortion. After breaking with Koestler, Howard had love affairs with poets Laurie Lee and Cecil Day-Lewis, father of the actor Daniel Day-Lewis. Howard was friends with both of the men's wives. At the time of her divorce she was employed as part-time secretary to the pioneering canals conservation organisation the Inland Waterways Association. There she met and collaborated with Robert Aickman. She described their affair in her autobiography Slipstream (2002). She also had affairs with the critics Cyril Connolly and Kenneth Tynan.

Her second marriage, to Australian broadcaster Jim Douglas-Henry in 1958, was brief and unhappy. In 1962, while organising the Cheltenham Literary Festival, Howard met the novelist Kingsley Amis. Both were married at the time. Amis became Howard's third husband in a marriage that lasted from 1965 to 1983. For part of that time, 1968–1976, they lived at Lemmons, a Georgian house in Barnet, where Howard wrote Something in Disguise (1969). Her stepson, Martin Amis, credited her with encouraging him to become a more serious reader and writer.

In later life, Howard lived in Bungay, Suffolk. She was appointed CBE in the 2000 Birthday Honours. She died at home on 2 January 2014, aged 90.

== Works ==
- The Beautiful Visit. Jonathan Cape. 1950. ISBN 978-0-224-60977-7. Winner of the John Llewellyn Rhys Prize
- We Are for the Dark: Six Ghost Stories. Jonathan Cape. 1951. (a collection containing three stories by Howard and three by Robert Aickman)
- The Long View. Jonathan Cape. 1956. ISBN 978-0-224-60318-8.
- The Sea Change. Jonathan Cape. 1959. ISBN 978-0-224-60319-5.
- After Julius. Jonathan Cape. 1965. ISBN 978-0-224-61037-7.
- Something in Disguise. Jonathan Cape. 1969. ISBN 978-0-224-61744-4.
- Odd Girl Out. Jonathan Cape. 1972. ISBN 978-0-224-00661-3.
- Mr. Wrong. Jonathan Cape. 1975.
- Getting It Right. Hamish Hamilton. 1982. ISBN 978-0-241-10805-5.
- The Light Years. Macmillan Publishers. 1990. ISBN 978-0-333-53875-3.
- Marking Time. Macmillan. 1991. ISBN 978-0-333-56596-4.
- Confusion. Macmillan. 1993. ISBN 978-0-333-57582-6.
- Casting Off. Macmillan. 1995. ISBN 978-0-333-60757-2.
- Falling. Macmillan. 1999. ISBN 978-0-333-73020-1.
- Slipstream. Macmillan. 2002. ISBN 978-0-333-90349-0.
- Howard, Elizabeth Jane (2003). Three Miles Up and Other Strange Stories. Tartarus Press. ISBN 978-1-872621-75-3. (Contains the three stories included in We Are for the Dark, plus "Mr Wrong".)
- Love All. Macmillan. 2008. ISBN 978-1-4050-4161-4.
- All Change. Macmillan. 2013. ISBN 978-0230743076.
- The Amazing Adventures of Freddie Whitemouse. Pan Macmillan. 2015. ISBN 978-1447293453.
- Green Shades: An Anthology of Plants, Gardens and Gardeners. Pan Macmillan. 2021. ISBN 978-1529050738.
