= The Cazalets =

2001 British television series

- DVD cover
- Genre: Drama/War
- Based on: The Cazalet Chronicles by Elizabeth Jane Howard
- Written by: Douglas Livingstone
- Directed by: Suri Krishnamma
- Starring: Hugh Bonneville; Anna Chancellor; Stephen Dillane; Lesley Manville; Frederick Treves; Joanna Page; Penny Downie
- Composer: Julian Nott
- Country of origin: United Kingdom
- Original language: English
- No. of series: 1
- No. of episodes: 6

Production
- Executive producers: Pippa Harris; Jane Tranter; Rebecca Eaton
- Producer: Verity Lambert
- Production company: Cinema Verity productions for BBC

Original release
- Network: BBC One
- Release: 22 June – 27 July 2001

The Cazalets is a 2001 television drama series in six episodes about the life of a large upper-middle class family in the years 1937 to 1942. Most of the action takes place in London and at the family's estate in Sussex.

The drama was based on The Light Years and Marking Time, the first two novels in the series of five by Elizabeth Jane Howard, entitled The Cazalet Chronicles and first published in the 1990s. For the TV series, they were adapted by the screenwriter Douglas Livingstone and the production was directed by Suri Krishnamma. The series was originally produced by Cinema Verity for BBC One and is available on DVD. Co-producer of the series was Joanna Lumley.

A BBC Radio 4 version in 45 episodes over five series, was also produced later, broadcast between December 2012 and April 2014.

== Cast ==
- Ursula Howells – Kitty 'The Duchy' Cazalet
- Frederick Treves – William 'The Brig' Cazalet, Kitty's husband
- Stephen Dillane – Edward Cazalet, middle son of Kitty & William
- Lesley Manville – Villy, Mrs Edward Cazalet
- Anna Chancellor – Diana Mackintosh, Edward's mistress
- Hugh Bonneville – Hugh Cazalet, eldest son of Kitty & William
- Anastasia Hille – Sybil, Mrs Hugh Cazalet
- Paul Rhys – Rupert Cazalet, youngest son of Kitty & William
- Joanna Page – Zoë, Mrs Rupert Cazalet (his second wife following the death of his first wife)
- Gemma Craven – Mrs Headford, Zoë's mother
- Catherine Russell – Rachel Cazalet, only daughter of Kitty & William
- Emma Griffiths Malin – Louise Cazalet, daughter of Edward and Villy Cazalet
- Claudia Renton – Polly Cazalet, daughter of Hugh and Sibyl Cazalet
- Florence Hoath – Clary Cazalet, daughter of Rupert Cazalet and his deceased first wife
- Alexander Pownall – Neville Cazalet, son of Rupert Cazalet and his deceased first wife
- Penny Downie – 'Sid', Rachel's secret girlfriend
- Patsy Rowlands – Miss Milliment, tutor to Louise and Polly, and later Clary
- John McArdle – Tonbridge, the chauffeur
- Jacqueline Tong – Mrs Cripps, the cook
