= Bella Mafia =

1997 American television film

- Genre: Crime; Drama
- Based on: Bella Mafia by Lynda La Plante
- Written by: Lynda La Plante
- Directed by: David Greene
- Starring: Vanessa Redgrave; Nastassja Kinski; Jennifer Tilly; Illeana Douglas; Dennis Farina
- Theme music composer: Joseph Vitarelli
- Country of origin: United States
- Original languages: English; Italian

Production
- Executive producer: Frank Konigsberg
- Producers: Jack Clements; Alfred Haber
- Production locations: Alverno High School; Los Angeles
- Cinematography: Gordon Lonsdale
- Editor: Michael Brown
- Running time: 117 minutes
- Production company: The Königsberg Company

Original release
- Network: CBS
- Release: November 16 – November 18, 1997

Bella Mafia is a 1997 American television film starring Vanessa Redgrave, Nastassja Kinski, Jennifer Tilly, Illeana Douglas and Dennis Farina. Redgrave was nominated for the Golden Globe Award for Best Actress – Miniseries or Television Film.

It is based on the book Bella Mafia written in 1991 by English author Lynda La Plante.

Les Moonves, the disgraced CEO of CBS Corporation, gave Illeana Douglas the role as part of a deal to keep her quiet about his sexual assault against her. Prior to getting a lawyer, Douglas was fired from a TV pilot and had her salary withheld by Moonves as retaliation. “I go from being sexually assaulted, fired for not having sex with Les Moonves, fired by everyone, to ‘We are going to pay you in full and we also want you to be on this miniseries,’ ” Douglas recalled.

== Plot ==
Lynda La Plante (who also created Widows) scripted this TV miniseries about the family life surrounding a Mafia don. Sicilian magnate Don Roberto Luciano (Dennis Farina) and his wife Graziella (Vanessa Redgrave) live comfortably at Villa Rosa in Palermo, Italy. Their son Michael (Michael Hayden) has an affair with Sophia (Nastassja Kinski), leaving her pregnant but unmarried. After Don Roberto refuses to traffic drugs, angry U.S. mob boss Carolla (Tony Lo Bianco) retaliates by having his son Michael killed. While at a convent, Sophia is given a hard blow when another pregnant woman tells her of his death; she almost immediately gives birth to Luca, Michael's son. Living at the convent, but determined to keep her son, she goes alone by herself to confront the Luciano family for money to support her son. However, the Lucianos are still coping with Michael's death and refuse admission to anyone, unless its family or those that work for them, through the gates. Despite the guard's insistence, Sophia still continues to try to seek an audience with them, only to be violently handled by the guards and almost thrown on the road. One of Michael's brothers, Constantino, taking pity on her, lets her in. He and his mother, Graziella, nurse the tired Sophia.

During her time in the villa, Sophia and Constantino fall in love. However, none of the Lucianos, including Constantino, know of her being Michael's former lover or of their son's existence. Roberto (Farina), sees Constantino's affections for Sophia and makes it clear to his wife that he doesn't approve of her, mostly due to her being poor and considered lower class. However, Graziella eventually gets her husband to understand Sophia and accept her. While the engagement is good news, Sophia secretly learns something devastating. Because she spent so long at the Lucianos and took too long of time to contact the convent, the nuns gave her son up for adoption. Sophia keeps this a secret. She eventually recovers and marries Constantino. The story begins to show the other brothers, Alfredo (Tony Maggio), who constantly tries to please their father, and Fredrico (W. Earl Brown), who is something of a troublemaker and doesn't like being told what to do.

Teresa Scorpio (Illeana Douglas), daughter of Mrs. Scorpio, the owner of a highly successful business in New York, is chosen by Graziella for Fredrico to marry, but Fredrico is openly opposed to it. Despite his objections, he and Alfredo are sent to New York to meet her. Fredrico happily sees Moyra (Jennifer Tilly), the former girlfriend of an American casino owner, Nicky Diamond, still remembering his one-time with Moyra. Fredrico has Alfredo meet Teresa instead, and both men fall in love with the women during their dates. Alfredo and Teresa marry and stay in America to run her family business. At their wedding reception, Fredrico shows up with Moyra, who is wearing a heavy coat. This clearly appalls Roberto, seeing her as a tramp. Roberto pulls his son aside, slaps him across the face, and angrily demands that he dump Moyra and meet a nice girl that Graziella has picked and that this time he won't refuse. However, both he and Moyra argue loudly about leaving. Sophia comes to the couple, attempting to quiet down the argument, but Moyra has had enough of keeping quiet and loudly announces: "I'm his wife!" She then takes off her coat to reveal her pregnant belly and announces she won't have the baby without the Luciano family supporting it. Moyra then goes into labor, and Fredrico yells at everyone to get a doctor.

Moyra loses the baby, most likely due to her smoking and drinking. She tells Sophia in her hospital room: "I had a son, perfect in every way, he just wasn't breathing." She cries to Sophia out of worry that Fredrico will divorce her because she lost the baby. After telling Fredrico to go to Moyra's room, she and Constantino have a small disagreement because his family clearly disapproves of Moyra. Coming from a lower-class family, Sophia stands up for her but during this she breaks down. She sobs due to her inability to conceive and also, secretly still missing her son. During that same night, she attempts to ask one of the nuns where her son is.

Sophia, once again faces more heart-breaking news, that her son disappeared and his adopted parents had given up on searching for him. Again, unknown to all, still believing she's depressed over her inability to conceive, Roberto decides to cheer up his daughter-in-law by giving her money to start her own boutique and fashion. Over the years, Teresa and Alfredo have a daughter named Rosa (Gina Philips), Moyra's accepted into the family, and Sophia's boutiques have become very popular. She and Constantino also gain wonderful news, she's pregnant. She soon gives birth to twin sons, named Roberto and Nunzio.

Elsewhere, Sophia's son called Luca (James Marsden), is revealed to be alive, but he's a violent child who was abused, and is almost feral with the monks who tend to him. He eventually befriends a sickly young man named Giorgio (Christopher Shaw), the son of Pietro Carolla. Over the years, he and Luca develop a brotherly friendship. However, Luca's violence and personality hasn't changed that much, much to Giorgio's dismay. Giorgio soon dies, but makes his father promise to look out for Luca. To appease his son's dying wish, Pietro adopts Luka, not knowing of Luka's sociopathic personality.

Not too long after, the Lucianos are finally able to have Pietro arrested and face trial for Michael Luciano's murder. Rosa is also planning to marry a young man close to Roberto's family. Believing their family is finally getting closure, all of the Luciano men (including Rosa's fiancé) go out for dinner to celebrate. Meanwhile, back at the Villa, the women are helping Rosa prepare her wedding dress. Unknown to all, the sadistic Luca, along with Carolla's men, decide to get their own revenge. Carolla's allies have the men's wine poisoned, making it seemingly appear like they had heart-attacks. Luca sneaks onto the Villa and cruelly and quietly shoots Sophia's sons while they're asleep in bed, not knowing that they are his half-brothers.

The women are struck with grief and mostly anger for what has happened and vow revenge. It won't be an easy road, as apparently they lose all their money (mostly through Carolla's interference). Mario Domino (Franco Nero) commits suicide. There are threats of Carolla's men. Luca visits his father in jail, proudly admitting that he killed Sophia's sons just to please him. Pietro is greatly disgusted by Luka's sadistic side and curses him. The next day, during Pietro's trial, the women plan to avenge their men and to shoot him in court. But Luca, under a heavy disguise, shoots Pietro and escapes the courthouse. He is accidentally hit by the Luciano women's car during his escape. They tend to his wounds and befriend him, unknown to his connections to Carolla or for that matter his true connection to Sophia.

Luca tells them he's an American. Over time he charms all the women and eventually gains Rosa's affections, but he still tries to seduce all the women, including Graziella and Sophia, not knowing of his genetic relation to them. During his stay, he kills two of Carolla's men who threatens the ladies in their home. To gain some money back, Luca, Teresa, Graziella, Rosa, and Moyra go to Vegas to rob chip money from her ex-boyfriend, Nicky Diamond. He and Moyra struggle, but Luca aggressively gets Nicky to tell them the combination of the safe. Moyra leaves with the money, not knowing that Luka will kill Nicky, and the women find that Graziella has oddly enough won a big lottery.

Meanwhile, back in New York, Sophia befriends an apparent American mafia man named Vito Giancamo (Peter Bogdanovich) and his son, Michael, who is about Rosa's age. While Michael is interested in Sophia, she tells Vito she can't give him grandchildren, and instead offers Rosa as Michael's fiancée. Through Sophia's (financial) persuasion, Vito agrees and Michael (David O'Donnell) is soon arranged to be engaged to Rosa. Not long after this deal, the police come to her and reveal Luca's true identity and that he has murdered several people, including the American whose name he uses. Realizing that he is responsible for the men's death, she goes to Carolla's mansion and prepares a poisoned meal for him.

When Luca arrives with the women, she informs them of his identity and they all help her serve him the poisoned food and wine. As he becomes weak, the women immediately bind him to his chair and confront him. He shows no remorse for the deeds, which includes killing the children. The women all leave the room and wait for the poison to kill him. Rosa, still apparently having feelings for him, tries to show him mercy or pity. Luca, is ungrateful and spits in her face, leaving her shocked to see his true colors.

Sophia, deciding to face him, stays by his side as he is dying. After a somewhat Oedipal moment between them, she eventually stabs Luca to avenge her sons. After that, she sees the necklace, a present from Michael, she gave her son when he was a baby, and yanks it off his neck. From the dying Luca she demands to know where he got it from. With his dying breath, he says that his mother left it to him. Sophia is shattered to discover that Luka is her son, and that she has murdered him. Afterwards, the women bury his body and Sophia burns her dress, in Carolla's backyard. They do not know that Luca was Sophia's son, but know that Sophia was the one with his blood on her hands. Therefore, Graziella makes Sophia the new head of the family.

Rosa and Michael Giancamo marry, with the women celebrating with many guests, including Carolla's allies. As Sophia and Teresa watch the young couple, it is revealed the women plan to finish out their revenge on Carolla's allies who helped murder their husbands. The Giancamo family will remain in the dark about it. Moyra eventually passes to Sophia the poisoned wine glass for Victor Muzetti (Michael Kagen), one of Carolla's men. It is hinted that Moyra may marry Vito Giancamo, since he's a widower, mostly through Sophia's encouragement that he'll take care of her. As Sophia watches Muzetti leave (almost immediately suffering from the poison, appearing like a heart-attack), she goes to a table. Nostalgically looking at Michael's picture, she soon opens it and it is revealed to have another photo behind it. The photo shows all of Carolla's men, and Sophia crosses off Muzetti's face.

== Cast members ==
- Dennis Farina as Don Roberto Luciano
- Vanessa Redgrave as Graziella Luciano
- Nastassja Kinski as Sophia Luciano
- Jennifer Tilly as Moyra Luciano
- Illeana Douglas as Teresa Scorpio Luciano
- Gina Philips as Rosa Luciano
- James Marsden as Luka Carolla
- Richard Portnow as Anthony Moreno
- Franco Nero as Mario Domino
- Peter Bogdanovich as Vito Giancamo
- David O'Donnell as Michael Giancamo
- Michael Hayden as Michael Luciano
- Richard Joseph Paul as Constantino Luciano
- W. Earl Brown as Fredrico Luciano
- Tony Maggio as Alfredo Luciano
- Tony Lo Bianco as Pietro Carolla
- Dimitra Arliss as Mrs. Scorpio, Teresa's mother
- Lukas Whitcomb as Roberto Luciano (child)
- Michael Whitcomb as Nunzio Luciano (child)

== Awards and nominations ==
Golden Globe Award

- Golden Globe Award for Best Actress – Miniseries or Television Film - Vanessa Redgrave (nomination)

Casting Society of America

- Best Casting for TV Miniseries' - Gary M. Zuckerbrod (nomination)

Motion Picture Sound Editors

- Golden Reel Award for Best Sound Editing - Television Mini-Series - Dialogue & ADR (nomination)
