= Douglas McFerran =

English actor (born 1958)

- Born: 1958 (age 67–68); Luton, Bedfordshire
- Occupations: Actor; writer; director; producer

Douglas McFerran (born 1958) is an English actor and writer. He has also directed and produced a small number of television programmes and films.

== Filmography ==
As actor:

Year	Title	Role	Notes
1981	Play for Today	Frank	TV series (1 episode: "London Is Drowning")
1982	Minder	Prison Officer	TV series
1986	To Have and to Hold	Man in Disco	TV series (1 episode: "Episode #1.5")
1987-2010	The Bill	Various	TV series (7 episodes)
1988	Me and My Girl	Andy	TV series (1 episode: "Play Your Cards Right")
1988	Mountain Language	Second Guard	TV short
1991	EastEnders	Mechanic	TV series (1 episode: "Episode #1.669")
1992	Sam Saturday	DC Braithwaite	TV series (1 episode: "A Chemical Reaction")
1992	Between the Lines	Sgt. Mount	TV series (1 episode: "Words of Advice")
1992	The Blackheath Poisonings	Bookie's Clerk	TV series (2 episodes)
1992	A Touch of Frost	Ronnie Eustace	TV series (1 episode: "Conclusions")
1994	The Chief	Detective Inspector Underwood	TV series (1 episode: "Episode #4.2")
1994	Minder	Quinn's Assistant	TV series
1994	Minder	Prison Officer	TV series
1994	Captives	Officer C	Film
1994	Heartbeat	Neil Gibson	TV series (1 episode: "Nice Girls Don't")
1995	99-1	Don Faber	TV series (2 episodes: "Dice" and "Stone")
1995	She's Out	DS John Palmer	TV series (6 episodes)
1995	Moving Story	Dale Frain	TV series (1 episode: "Bear Necessities")
1995-2017	Emmerdale	Morris Blakey / Ken Adlington	TV series (20 episodes)
1996	Our Friends in the North	Detective Sergeant Croxley	TV series (1 episode: "1970")
1996	When Saturday Comes	Norman, the Foreman	Film
1996	In Your Dreams	TV Journalist	TV movie
1997	Birds of a Feather	Darryl	TV series (5 episodes)
1997-1998	London's Burning	A.D.O. Davies	TV series (10 episodes)
1998	Sliding Doors	Russell	Film ^{a}
1998	Touch and Go	Andy	TV movie
2001	Antitrust	Bob Shrot	Film ^{a}
2003	Johnny English	Klaus Vendetta	Film ^{a}
2003	Shoreditch	Inspector Turner	Film
2004	Charlie	Richard Aubury	Film
2007	The Whistleblowers	Solicitor	TV series (1 episode: "Environment")
2007-2010	Brilliant!	Frank	TV miniseries (3 episodes)
2008	Midnight Man	Defence Secretary	TV miniseries (1 episode: "Part 3")
2008	Criminal Justice	Sergeant Greening	TV series (1 episode: "Episode #1.1")
2009	Margaret	MP	TV movie
2009	Peep Show	Security Guard	TV series (1 episode: "Jeremy at JLB")
2011	Waking the Dead	Legwinski	TV series (2 episodes)
2012	Hunted	Rafi the Rabbit	TV series (1 episode: "Polyhedrus")
2012	Sherlock Holmes Confidential	Dr. Watson	Short film
2017	The Yellow Birds	Airport Bartender	Film
2019	Four Weddings and a Funeral	Chester	TV series (1 episode: "Four Friends and a Secret")
2019	Zomboat!	Lawrence	TV series (1 episode: "Episode #1.5")
2023	Doctors	Ted Morris	Episode: "Day in the Life"

As writer:

Year	Title	Role	Notes
1998	Sliding Doors	Script consultant	Film ^{a}
2003	Photo Finish	Writer	Film ^{b}
2004	Laws of Attraction	Additional script	Film ^{a}
2007-2010	Brilliant!	Writer	TV miniseries ^{b}

== Notes ==
- ^aFilm directed by Peter Howitt.
- ^bDirected/produced by McFerran.
