= Jackie Malton =

British writer

Jackie Malton (born 1951) is a UK television script consultant and former senior police officer best known for being the inspiration for the character of DCI Jane Tennison in the Prime Suspect drama written by Lynda La Plante.

== Life and career ==
Malton's police career, initially in the Leicestershire and then the Metropolitan Police Service, was notable for her rise within the ranks of a very male, heterosexual establishment while being a woman detective who was openly gay. Malton worked in a number of areas, including the Flying Squad, Murder Squad and Fraud Squad. She also acted as a whistle-blower against police corruption in the 1980s.

Following her work with La Plante on the Prime Suspect series, and her involvement with Cracker and Band of Gold, Malton retired from the Metropolitan Police in 1997 to pursue a career in script consultancy and has subsequently worked on over twenty major television police series including The Bill, Trial & Retribution, Life on Mars, Ashes to Ashes, both series of Murder Investigation Team and The Level for ITV. Malton also wrote a play, which was aired on BBC Radio 4 entitled "Be Mine".

Between 2008 and 2012, Malton achieved an MA in Creative Writing and an MSc in Addiction Psychology. She contributed a chapter to Addiction, Behavioural Change and Social Identity, edited by Sarah A. Buckingham and David Best.

Malton, who was already a Freeman of the City of London, was awarded an honorary doctorate from London South Bank University in October 2019 as Doctor of the university. Malton continues to volunteer in a prison with men who have a range of addiction issues, that often have had the most profound effect on their lives and the lives of others.

Her TV documentary series, The Real Prime Suspect examined ten high-profile murder cases and was aired in 2019; the second series was released in 2020. Both have been seen in the US, South Africa and across Europe.

Jackie Malton's biography, "The Real Prime Suspect" was published by Endeavour in 2023. In this book she admits to once having had a drinking problem and she identifies herself as a gay woman.
