= Supply & Demand (TV series) =

British television crime drama series (1997–1998)

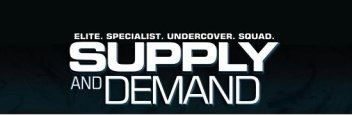
- Genre: Crime drama
- Created by: Lynda La Plante
- Directed by: Waris Hussein; Colin Bucksey
- Starring: Adé Sapara; Eamonn Walker; Benedict Wong; Juliet Aubrey; Miriam Margolyes; Stella Gonet; Larry Lamb; Martin Kemp
- Composer: Robert Lockhart
- Country of origin: United Kingdom
- Original language: English
- No. of series: 2
- No. of episodes: 7

Production
- Executive producers: Steve Lanning; Keith Richardson
- Producer: Liz Thorburn
- Cinematography: Howard Baker
- Editor: Peter Krook
- Running time: 100 minutes (Pilot); 50 minutes (Series)
- Production companies: La Plante Productions; Yorkshire Television

Original release
- Network: ITV
- Release: 5 February 1997 – 6 October 1998

Supply & Demand is a British television crime drama series, written and devised by Lynda La Plante, first broadcast as a single feature-length pilot on ITV on 5 February 1997. The series follows the work of ESUS (Elite Specialist Undercover Squad), a crack team of detectives tasked with investigating some of the country's biggest criminal importers and smugglers. The pilot was written in 1996, the year that La Plante's most notable television series, Prime Suspect, went on hiatus. Adé Sapara, Eamonn Walker, Benedict Wong, Juliet Aubrey Freddie Starr and Ramon Tikaram were credited as principal cast members for the pilot.

ITV subsequently commissioned a full series of six hour-long episodes, which were filmed and broadcast in 1998. These were three two-part stories. Sapara, Walker and Wong returned to the series, alongside new principal cast members Miriam Margolyes, Larry Lamb, Stella Gonet and Martin Kemp. Paul Brodrick and Christine Harmar-Brown co-wrote scripts for the series alongside La Plante. Despite the series achieving a steady viewing audience between 6 and 7 million viewers, La Plante felt that the series had reached a natural end and decided not to write any further episodes, thus meaning the last episode was broadcast on 6 October 1998.

The complete series was released on DVD on 23 July 2007.

== Cast ==
- Adé Sapara as DI Carl Harrington
- Eamonn Walker as DS Jake Brown
- Benedict Wong as DC Frankie Li

=== Pilot ===
- Juliet Aubrey as DCI Alex Chomsky
- Freddie Starr as Lance Izzard
- Ramon Tikaram as DC Irwin
- Fintan McKeown as DCI Smith
- Colin McCormack as Supt. Les Harper
- Ron Donachie as Supt. Brent

=== Series ===
- Miriam Margolyes as Chief Supt. Edna Colley
- Larry Lamb as Detective Supt. Simon Hughes
- Stella Gonet as DCI Jane Leyland
- Martin Kemp as DI Eddie McEwan
- Terry O'Neill as DS Peter Harper
- Christopher Simon as DC Mikey Da Souza

== Episodes ==
=== Pilot (1997) ===
No.	Title	Directed by	Written by	UK airdate
1	"Supply & Demand"	Peter MacDonald	Lynda La Plante	5 February 1997
DI Carl Harrington is appointed the new leader of ESUS, the elite specialist undercover squad. His first case is that of suspected drugs importer Lance Anthony Izzard, who is shipping a large consignment of drugs across the channel in a tanker. As Harrington and the team pursue the tanker, an incident involving an overtaking vehicle near roadworks causes the tanker to crash, and both the driver and co-driver to be killed in the incident. Harrington, however, seizes the chance to go undercover by posing himself as the co-driver, and allowing the haul of drugs to be collected by Izzard to implicate him. DI Alex Chomsky is not too pleased that DI Harrington has taken matters into his own hands, however, and is soon forced to overrule him when his cover is blown and he is forced to take class A drugs against his will. Meanwhile, the team attempt to catch Izzard in the act.

=== Series 1 (1998) ===
No.	Title	Directed by	Written by	Original release date	UK viewers (million)
1	"Raw Recruit (Part 1)"	Waris Hussein	Lynda La Plante	1 September 1998	8.89
ESUS are asked to provide back up for DS Barbara Hall, who has been undercover for six months and is believed to be acting as a mule for Miguel Morena, a drugs importer who is thought to be negotiating a huge shipment of cocaine into Britain. When Hall fails to make contact of her arrival at London's City Airport, the team become suspicious. Has she gone OTS and joined forces with Moreno, or has she fallen for his associate?
2	"Raw Recruit (Part 2)"	Waris Hussein	Lynda La Plante	8 September 1998	7.13
When Hall is murdered, DI Brown is determined to prove that Dt. Supt Hughes was somehow involved.
3	"Golden Goose (Part 1)"	Waris Hussein	Paul Brodrick	15 September 1998	6.92
When junior secretary Peter Gleeson commits suicide after being exposed as being a homosexual, the team go undercover to investigate a private drinking club called the Golden Goose where they become embroiled in scandal, blackmail and tragedy.
4	"Golden Goose (Part 2)"	Waris Hussein	Paul Brodrick	22 September 1998	6.58
Owner Pauline Monroe's sidelines in drugs and prostitution appear to be the key to unraveling the entire scam, but Hughes and McEwan come close to becoming embroiled themselves. As Edna discovers the truth, tragedy strikes when a drunken Monroe unleashes a gun on DI Brown.
5	"Blood Ties (Part 1)"	Colin Bucksey	Christine Harmar-Brown	29 September 1998	6.74
DS Harper comes face-to-face with an old adversary when Frankie Li goes undercover as a martial arts expert as the team investigates a corrupt Hong Kong businessman, whose suspicious cargo being brought in a cheese van alerts the team to a much bigger operation which involves locating the student catalyst for the Tiananmen Square riots.
6	"Blood Ties (Part 2)"	Colin Bucksey	Christine Harmar-Brown	6 October 1998	7.25
As Roger's identity is finally revealed, and an attempt to rescue his granddaughter Natasha backfires, resulting in Harper taking out the prime suspect - as well as two other civilians.
