= Joyce Porter =

English author (1924–1990)

Joyce Porter (28 March 1924 – 9 December 1990) was an English crime fiction author. She was born in Marple, Cheshire. In Macclesfield she attended the High School for Girls, then King's College London. She served in the Women's Royal Air Force from 1949 to 1963. An intensive course in Russian qualified her for intelligence work for the WRAF. She left the service determined to pursue a full-time career in writing, having written three detective novels already.

Joyce Porter lived the last years of her life in a thatched cottage in Longbridge Deverill, a village in Wiltshire.

Porter created the characters of Eddie Brown, Constance Ethel Morrison-Burke, and Wilfred Dover.

== Dover books ==
In DCI Wilfred Dover and his assistant Sergeant MacGregor, she created a template later used successfully, especially by Reginald Hill, in straight 'whodunnits', but Porter's novels, while intricately plotted, were always played for laughs. But despite their light-hearted nature, Porter allowed the books to reflect topical themes. Dover is obese, lazy, unhygienic and bordering on corrupt. MacGregor is keen, clean and ferociously ambitious. However, on the rare occasions he is able to put aside plate, pint-glass and cigarettes long enough to concentrate, Dover usually sees the answer first.

== Honourable Constance books ==
The Honourable Constance Ethel Morrison-Burke is an upper-class spinster who, armed only with pluck, a deep-rooted hatred of men and her family's enormous financial resources, sallies forth to fight crime with the aid of her devoted companion Miss Jones. (In The Fine Art of Murder, editors Ed Gorman et al. describe Morrison-Burke as "the first clearly lesbian detective in fiction.") The 'Hon Con' books were even less like straight 'who-dunnits' than the 'Dovers' because while Dover is an experienced copper who has, it becomes clear, a good brain, the 'Hon Con' is an amateur bungler of below-average intelligence. Therefore, her solving of each case had to be achieved entirely by a happy coincidence.

== Publications ==
Detective Chief Inspector Wilfred Dover

- Dover One (1964)
- Dover Two (1965)
- Dover Three (1965)
- Dover and the Unkindest Cut of All (1967)
- Dover Goes to Pott (1968)
- Dover Strikes Again (1970)
- It's Murder with Dover (1973)
- Dover and the Claret Tappers (1976)
- Dead Easy for Dover (1978)
- Dover Beats the Band (1980)
- Dover: The Collected Short Stories (1995)

Eddie Brown, The World's Most Reluctant Spy

- Sour Cream with Everything (1966)
- The Chinks in the Curtain (1967)
- Neither a Candle Nor a Pitchfork (1969)
- Only with a Bargepole (1971)

Constance Ethel Morrison Burke

- Rather a Common Sort of Crime (1970) (aka Constance Ethel Morrison Burke)
- A Meddler and Her Murder (1972)
- The Package Included Murder (1975)
- Who the Heck is Sylvia? (1977)
- The Cart Before the Crime (1979)

== Adaptations ==
A number of the Inspector Dover books have been adapted for BBC Radio 4 by Paul Mendelson and star Kenneth Cranham as Dover.

- Dover Goes to Pott
- Dover and the Claret Tappers
- Dover Beats the Band
- Dover and The Sleeping Beauty (16 January 2010)
- Dover and the Unkindest Cut of All

And a new story by Paul Mendelson based on the characters

- Dover and the Smoking Gun (1 October 2001)
