= Paul Venables =

British actor (born 1962)

- Born: February 3, 1962 (age 63)
- Occupation: Actor
- Years active: 1985–present
- Notable credits: Stanley's Dragon; May to December; The Archers
- Spouse: Rachel Joyce
- Children: 4

Paul Venables (born 3 February 1962) is a British actor who has appeared in film, television, radio and theatre.

Venables grew up in Devon and then trained as an actor at the Central School of Speech and Drama. His breakthrough role was as Jamie Callender in the BBC TV series May to December. Additionally, he has had television roles in Wycliffe, Midsomer Murders, Blue Murder, Revelations, Silent Witness, Lewis, and Holby City as board member Toby Carr. Venables has played leading roles for the Royal Shakespeare Company as well as in the West End.

He currently plays the part of vet Jakob Hakansson in BBC Radio 4's The Archers.

He is married to author Rachel Joyce, and lives in Gloucestershire with his wife and four children.

== Filmography ==
- The Princess Academy (1987) – Justin
- Stanley's Dragon (1994) – Henry Driver
- The House of Mirth (2000) – Jack Stepney
- Skyfall (2012) – Inquiry Member No. 1
