= Vanity Fair (1987 TV serial) =

- BBC ad with Rebecca Saire
- Based on: Vanity Fair by William Makepeace Thackeray
- Screenplay by: Alexander Baron
- Directed by: Diarmuid Lawrence; Michael Owen Morris
- Starring: Eve Matheson; Rebecca Saire
- Music by: Nigel Hess
- Original language: English

Production
- Producer: Terrance Dicks
- Running time: 35 min. (16 episodes)

Original release
- Network: BBC
- Release: 6 September – 20 December 1987

Vanity Fair is a 1987 BBC Pebble Mill Production consisting of sixteen 35 minute episodes. It is an adaptation of the 1848 novel Vanity Fair by William Makepeace Thackeray. The serial was shot on location and in studio. Locations included Winchester and Thetford. Virtually all the interiors were shot in Studio A at Pebble Mill.

The series stars Eve Matheson as Becky Sharp, Rebecca Saire as Amelia Sedley, Simon Dormandy as William Dobbin, Jack Klaff as Rawdon Crawley, David Swift as Mr. Sedley, James Saxon as Joseph 'Jos' Sedley, Gillian Raine as Mrs. Sedley, Benedict Taylor as George Osborne, Shaughan Seymour as Pitt Crawley, Philippa Urquhart as Miss Briggs and Freddie Jones as Sir Pitt Crawley. Amanda Murray appeared as Ann Dobbin in three episodes.

The story is set in the time of the Napoleonic Wars. Becky Sharp, a poor orphan girl, schemes for money and position. Her most-used stepladder is her old school friend, Amelia Sedley. Both women marry soldiers, and both of them are affected by the Battle of Waterloo.

== Episodes ==
Episode	Title	Air Date
1	Miss Sharp and Miss Sedley Open the Campaign	6 September 1987
2	Vauxhall Gardens	13 September 1987
3	Crawley of Queen's Crawley	20 September 1987
4	Arcadian Simplicity	20 September 1987
5	Who Played the Piano?	4 October 1987
6	A Marriage and Part of a Honeymoon	11 October 1987
7	Amelia Invades the Low Countries	18 October 1987
8	The Girl I Left Behind Me	25 October 1987
9	Widow and Brother	1 November 1987
10	How to Live Well on Nothing a Year	8 November 1987
11	Struggles and Trials	15 November 1987
12	The Very Best of Company	22 November 1987
13	A Vulgar Incident	29 November 1987
14	After the Battle	6 December 1987
15	Our Friend the Major	13 December 1987
16	Old Acquaintance	20 December 1987
