= Unnatural Causes (TV series) =

British television anthology series

- Country of origin: United Kingdom
- Original language: English
- No. of seasons: 1
- No. of episodes: 7

Production
- Executive producer: Ted Childs
- Producer: Nicholas Palmer
- Running time: 50 minutes
- Production company: Central Independent Television

Original release
- Network: ITV
- Release: 8 November – 20 December 1986

Unnatural Causes is a British television anthology series broadcast on ITV from 8 November to 20 December 1986.

Comprising seven stand-alone episodes, the series explored deaths in unusual circumstances. The series writers included Beryl Bainbridge, Nigel Kneale and Lynda La Plante.

This programme was produced by Central Independent Television for the ITV network.

A paperback novelisation, edited by Bainbridge, was published by Javelin Books to accompany the series.

== Episodes ==
No.	Title	Directed by	Written by	Original release date
1	"Home Cooking"	Tim King	Paula Milne	8 November 1986
Cast: Prunella Scales (Judith), Brian Cox (Vic), Jim Norton (Gordon), Belinda Lang (Helen), Gina McKee (Nancy), Tom Kelly (Young Husband), Nula Conwell (Young Wife)
2	"Hidden Talents"	Don Leaver	Lynda La Plante	15 November 1986
Cast: Tom Bell (Harold), Tom Georgeson (Stanley), Pat Phoenix (Nellie)
3	"Lost Property"	Alan Dossor	Peter Hammond	22 November 1986
Cast: John Duttine (John Forrest), Miranda Richardson (Anne Forrest), Louise Hellicar (Marion Price)
4	"Window, Sir?"	Don Leaver	Ron Hutchinson	29 November 1986
Cast: Robert Stephens (Vince), John Cater (Perry), Ann Mitchell (Morved), Ivor Roberts (Commercial traveller)
5	"Ladies' Night"	Herbert Wise	Nigel Kneale	6 December 1986
Cast: Alfred Burke (Colonel Waley), Bryan Pringle (Bundock), Ronald Pickup (James Tripp), Fiona Walker (Evelyn Tripp), Nigel Stock (Monks), John Golightly (Greenhow)
6	"Partners"	John Cooper	Nicholas Palmer	13 December 1986
Cast: Warren Clarke (Dan), Annette Crosbie (Helen), Frances de la Tour (Marcia), Ronald Lacey (Eric), Michael Ripper (Albert)
7	"Evensong"	Roy Battersby	Beryl Bainbridge	20 December 1986
Cast: Dorothy Tutin (Louise), Julia Deakin (Pamela), Perry Fenwick (Keith), Alan Howard (Graeme)
