= Adé Sapara =

English actor

- Born: Adé Sapara; 1964 (age 61–62); Barnet, Hertfordshire, England
- Occupation: Actor
- Years active: 29 years

Adé Sapara (born 1964) is an English actor, mainly in supporting roles in films and TV series.

== Filmography ==
- Sammy and Rosie Get Laid, 1987
- Crusoe, 1989
- Riff-Raff, 1991
- The Bill, 1993, one TV episode & 2000, two TV episodes
- Privateer 2: The Darkening, 1996
- Nachtgestalten (or Nightshapes), 1999)
- Doctors, 2002, one TV episode
- Casualty, 1991, 1995 and 2005, three TV episodes
- Holby City, 2005, two TV episodes
- London Fields, 2015
- 2036: Nexus Dawn, 2017
- London's Burning, 1993 & 1994, 4 TV episodes
