= Lynda La Plante =

English writer and actress (born 1943)

Lynda La Plante CBE
- Born: Lynda Joy Titchmarsh; 15 March 1943 (age 83); Newton-le-Willows, Lancashire, England
- Occupations: Author, screenwriter, actress
- Spouse: Richard La Plante (m. 1979; div. 1996)
- Writing career
- Years active: 1964–present
- Website: lyndalaplante.com

Lynda Joy La Plante, CBE (née Titchmarsh; born 15 March 1943) is an English author, screenwriter and former actress. She created and wrote the police procedural television series Prime Suspect. In 2024, she was honoured with the Crime Writers' Association of Britain's Diamond Dagger award for her outstanding lifetime's contribution to the crime and mystery fiction genre.

== Early life ==
Lynda La Plante was born Lynda Joy Titchmarsh on 15 March 1943 in Newton-le-Willows, Lancashire. La Plante's older sister Dail was killed in a road accident, at the age of five, before she was born. Her younger sister, Gill Titchmarsh, is a casting director, and the two have often worked together. They also had a brother, Michael, who was a doctor.

Raised in Crosby, Liverpool, La Plante trained for the stage at the Royal Academy of Dramatic Art. After finishing her studies, using the stage name Lynda Marchal, she appeared with the Royal Shakespeare Company in a variety of productions, as well as popular television series including Z-Cars, The Doctors, Educating Marmalade, The Sweeney, The Professionals, and Bergerac. In 1974, La Plante took her first scriptwriting job on the ITV children's series The Kids from 47A.

== Widows and career breakthrough ==
La Plante's breakthrough came in 1983 when she created and wrote the six-part robbery series Widows for Thames Television. The plot concerned the widows of four armed robbers carrying out a heist planned by their deceased husbands. A second series of Widows followed in 1985, while a sequel She's Out took up the story ten years later.

La Plante's debut novel, The Legacy, was published in 1987 and received both critical and best-seller success. Her second, third and fourth novels came soon after – The Talisman (1987), Bella Mafia (1990) and Entwined (1993) – all of which became international best sellers. In 1990, La Plante started working on her next television project, Prime Suspect, which was released by Granada Television in 1991. Prime Suspect starred Helen Mirren as DCI Jane Tennison, based on real-life Metropolitan Police Flying Squad detective, Jackie Malton. Prime Suspect aired in the UK as well as on PBS in the United States as part of the anthology program Mystery!. In 1993, La Plante won an Edgar Award from the Mystery Writers of America for her work on the series. In 1992, she wrote a TV film called Seekers, starring Brenda Fricker and Josette Simon, produced by Sarah Lawson.

In 1993, La Plante formed her own television production company, La Plante Productions and through her new company she wrote and produced high-rating series The Governor (ITV 1995–96), Supply & Demand (ITV 1997–98), Killer Net (Channel 4 1998), acclaimed series Trial & Retribution (ITV 1997–2009), Mind Games (ITV 2001) and The Commander (ITV 2003–08). During this period, La Plante also released the Cold series of books; Cold Shoulder, Cold Blood and Cold Heart, followed by Sleeping Cruelty (2000) – adding to her list of best sellers.

In 1996, La Plante co-wrote and executive produced The Prosecutors (NBC) with Tom Fontana (starring Stockard Channing), wrote and executive produced Bella Mafia (1998 CBS) (starring Vanessa Redgrave), which La Plante adapted from her novel of the same name. In 2001, she co-produced The Warden (2001 TNT), starring Ally Sheedy, a variation of La Plante's series The Governor. La Plante also co-produced her adaptation of the UK hit Widows (2002 ABC) and produced the pilot of Cold Shoulder (2006 New Regency / CBS) starring Kelly McGillis, which was based on her Cold series. La Plante was also executive producer on Daniel Petrie Jr's adaptation of her show Framed (2002 TNT) which starred Sam Neill and Rob Lowe.

La Plante released Royal Flush (2002), and then began working on her Anna Travis series, which includes Above Suspicion (2004), The Red Dahlia (2005), Clean Cut (2007), Deadly Intent (2008), Silent Scream (2009), Blind Fury (2010), Blood Line (2011), Backlash (2012), and Wrongful Death (2013). So successful were the books that a UK television series was written and produced by La Plante starring Kelly Reilly and Ciarán Hinds.

Widows was remade as a US-set film in 2018, directed by Steve McQueen. Prime Suspect was also remade as an American series, starring Maria Bello. It ran for 13 episodes in 2011–2012.

== Awards ==
La Plante has received many awards over the course of her career. For her work on Prime Suspect, she received two Emmy Awards for Outstanding Miniseries (1993, 1994), as well as the Edgar Allan Poe Award for Best Mystery TV Episode. In 2001, the British Academy of Film and Television Arts (BAFTA) gave her the Dennis Potter Award for television writing.

In 2008, La Plante was appointed Commander of the Order of the British Empire (CBE) in the Queen's Birthday Honours List for services to Literature, Drama and to Charity. In the same year, she received the TV Spielfilm Award at the International Film and Television Festival Conference in Cologne, Germany, for her television adaptation of her novel Above Suspicion.

In 2009, La Plante was inducted into the Crime Thriller Awards Hall of Fame and most recently, in 2013, La Plante was awarded an honorary fellowship with the Forensic Science Society (FSSoc), the first non-scientist to be inducted into the professional body; receiving the award for the accuracy with which she portrays forensic science in her work.

In 2024, she was named winner of the Crime Writers' Association of Britain's Diamond Dagger award for her outstanding lifetime's contribution to the crime and mystery fiction genre.

She has also been made an honorary member of the British Film Institute, an honorary fellow from Liverpool John Moores University, and in July 2022 an Honorary Doctor of Arts (HonDA) by Edge Hill University.

== Works ==
=== Television and film ===
- The Kids from 47A (1973–1974)
- Widows (1983–1985)
- Unnatural Causes: Hidden Talents (1986)
- Screen One: Seconds Out (1992)
- Civvies (1992)
- Framed (1992)
- Seekers (1993)
- Comics (1993)
- Prime Suspect (1993–2006)
- The Lifeboat (1994)
- She's Out (1995) (sequel to Widows)
- The Governor (1995–1996)
- Supply & Demand (1997–1998)
- Trial & Retribution (1997–2009)
- Bella Mafia (1997)
- Killer Net (1998)
- Cold Shoulder (2000)
- Mind Games (2001)
- Widows (2002) (US adaptation of the series of the same name)
- The Commander (2003–2008)
- Above Suspicion (2009–2012)
- Prime Suspect (2011–2012) (US adaptation of the series of the same name)
- Prime Suspect 1973 (2017)
- Widows (2018) (Film adaptation of the TV series of the same name)

=== Literature ===
Dolly Rawlins/Widows/Jack Warr

- Widows (1983/2018)
- Widows II (1985) / Widows' Revenge (2019)
- She's Out (1995)
- Buried (2020)
- Judas Horse (2021)
- Vanished (2022)
- Pure Evil (2023)
- Crucified (2025)
- Sacrifice (2026)

Legacy

- The Legacy (1987)
- The Talisman (1987)

Jane Tennison

- Prime Suspect (1991)
- Prime Suspect 2 (1992)
- Prime Suspect 3 (1993)
- Tennison (2015) (basis of British TV series Prime Suspect 1973)
- Hidden Killers (2016)
- Good Friday (2017)
- Murder Mile (2018)
- The Dirty Dozen (2019)
- Blunt Force (2020)
- Unholy Murder (2021)
- Dark Rooms (2022)
- A Taste of Blood (2023)
- Whole Life Sentence (2024)

Lorraine Page

- Cold Shoulder (1994)
- Cold Blood (1996)
- Cold Heart (1998)

The Governor

- The Governor (1995)
- The Governor 2 (1996)

Trial And Retribution

- Trial and Retribution (1997)
- Trial and Retribution II (1998)
- Trial and Retribution III (1999)
- Trial and Retribution IV (2000)
- Trial and Retribution V (2002)
- Trial and Retribution VI (2002)

Anna Travis

- Above Suspicion (2004)
- The Red Dahlia (2006)
- Clean Cut (2007)
- Deadly Intent (2008)
- Silent Scream (2009)
- Blind Fury (2010)
- Bloodline (2011)
- Backlash (2012)
- Wrongful Death (2013)

Jessica Russell

- The Scene of the Crime (2025)

Other Novels

- Bella Mafia (1991)
- Civvies (1992)
- Entwined (1992)
- Framed (1992)
- Seekers (1993)
- Comics (1993)
- Sleeping Cruelty (2000)
- Royal Flush (2002)
- Twisted (2014)
- Sudden Death (2026)

Short stories

- The Little One (2012)

Autobiography

- Getting Away With Murder (2024)

== Personal life ==
She was married to musician Richard La Plante for 17 years, until their divorce in 1996.

In 2003 she adopted an American baby son whose name is Lorcan.
