= Andrew McCulloch (writer) =

Scottish television writer and actor

- Born: 1945 (age 80–81); Ayr, Scotland
- Education: Royal Central School of Speech and Drama
- Occupations: Actor, writer

Andrew McCulloch (born 1945), often credited as Andy McCulloch, is a Scottish television writer and actor.

== Biography ==
Born on 27 October 1945 in Ayr, Scotland, Andrew McCulloch was educated at Bedford School and trained as an actor at the Central School of Speech and Drama.

=== Career ===
McCulloch's film credits include the 1969 version of David Copperfield, where he played Ham Peggotty, Cry of the Banshee (1970), The Last Valley (1971), Roman Polanski's Macbeth (1971), Kidnapped (1973), Nothing But the Night (1973), The Land That Time Forgot (1974) and Cry Freedom (1987). His television credits include Colonel Leckie in the BBC series By the Sword Divided and parts in Taggart, Softly, Softly: Task Force, Messiah and the cult comedy Father Ted.

McCulloch's first television writing credit was for the Doctor Who story "Meglos" in 1980, penned with John Flanagan, with whom he retains a regular writing partnership. A second script for the following season, called "Project Zeta-Sigma", failed to materialise. In 1991 however they wrote the cult spy series Sleepers, which was shown on BBC Two and starred Nigel Havers and Warren Clarke. He has also written for Murder in Suburbia, numerous episodes of Heartbeat and its spin-off The Royal, and gained critical acclaim for Margery & Gladys with June Brown and Penelope Keith in 2003.
