= Eve Matheson =

English actress

- Born: Eve Elisabeth Matheson; 2 March 1960 (age 66); London, England
- Occupation: Actress
- Years active: 1982–present
- Spouse: Phil Davis (m. 2002)
- Children: 1

Eve Elisabeth Matheson (born 2 March 1960) is an English actress. She is best known for her roles as Zoe Angell in May to December and Becky Sharp in the BBC adaptation of the novel Vanity Fair. Matheson left May to December after two series to pursue her career on stage. From 2005 to 2006, she appeared as Mrs Milcote in the original Royal National Theatre production of Helen Edmundson's Coram Boy.

== Personal life ==
Eve Matheson is married to the actor Phil Davis and they have one daughter.

== Filmography ==
=== Film ===
Year	Film	Role	Notes
1997	Amy Foster	Mrs Willcox	
2009	In the Loop	New Minister	
2022	Persuasion	Mrs Musgrove	

=== Television ===
Year	Show	Role	Notes
1983	Brookside	Sister Catherine	"The Poverty Trap"
1983	Jane Eyre	Leah	TV miniseries
1984	The Adventures of Sherlock Holmes	Miss Tangey	"The Naval Treaty"
1986	What If It's Raining	Siobhan	"1.1", "1.2", "1.3"
1987	Vanity Fair	Rebecca Sharp	Main role
1989–90	May to December	Zoë Angell	Main role (series 1–2); 13 episodes
1991	Stay Lucky	Cassy Quinn	"The Sisters of Achill"
1992	Boon	Rebecca Blake	"Shot in the Dark"
1992	The Bill	WDS Crest	"It's a Small World", "Licence"
1993	Lovejoy	Valerie Endacott	"Three Men and a Brittle Lady"
1994	Grushko	Nina	TV miniseries
1994	The Bill	Ruth Gale	"Last Rights"
1998	Heartbeat	Moira Hamilton	"Appearances"
1998	Maisie Raine	Catherine Jeavons	"Getting to Be a Habit"
1999	The Ambassador	Catherine Grieve	Regular role
2001	Holby City	Cara Walker	"I'm Not in Love"
2001	The Bill	Eva Melchor	"White Cliffs of Dover"
2005	Jericho	Rita Harvey	TV miniseries
2005, 2007	The Thick of It	Claire Ballentine	"2.3", "Spinners and Losers"
2008	The Bill	Helen Harvey	"Pay Back"
2008	Doctors	Maggie Hart	"Relinquishment"
2009	Holby City	Karen Guest	"Seeing Other People"
2011	Holby City	Gene Defries	"My Hero"
2012	Holby City	Sinead Bainbridge	"The Third Way"
2012	DCI Banks	Elise Lambert	"Strange Affair: Parts 1 & 2"
2013	My Mad Fat Diary	Moira Edwards	"It's a Wonderful Rae: Part 2"
2014	Call the Midwife	Gov. Anderson	"3.3"
2015	Silent Witness	Commander Jane Garner	"Falling Angels: Part 2"
2017	Holby City	Maya Horton	"Wildest Dreams"
