= May to December =

British TV sitcom (1989–1994)

- Series 2 title card
- Created by: Paul Mendelson
- Starring: Anton Rodgers; Eve Matheson; Lesley Dunlop; Clive Francis; Rebecca Lacey; Frances White; Paul Venables; Carolyn Pickles; Kate Williams; Ronnie Stevens; Chrissie Cotterill; Ashley Jensen
- Country of origin: United Kingdom
- Original language: English
- No. of series: 6 (+1 radio series)
- No. of episodes: 39 (+6 radio episodes)

Production
- Running time: 30–60 minutes
- Production company: Cinema Verity

Original release
- Network: BBC1
- Release: 2 April 1989 – 27 May 1994

May to December is a British sitcom which ran for 39 episodes, from 2 April 1989 to 27 May 1994 on BBC1. The series was created by Paul Mendelson and produced by Cinema Verity. Set in Pinner, Greater London, it revolved around the romance between a widowed solicitor, Alec Callender (played by veteran television actor Anton Rodgers) and a much younger woman, Zoë Angell (played by Eve Matheson in series one and two, and by Lesley Dunlop in series three to six).

The series was nominated for the BAFTA award for "Best Television Comedy Series" in 1991, but lost out to The New Statesman. The title of the show comes from the Maxwell Anderson–Kurt Weill song "September Song", which is sung during the credits. The titles of all the episodes are taken from songs. Most are from musicals, reflecting Alec and Zoë's mutual interest, but some later titles are hits from the 1950s and 1960s.

In keeping with a number of other BBC sitcoms, such as To the Manor Born, Yes Minister, As Time Goes By, One Foot in the Grave and others, a radio adaptation of episodes was produced. Episodes were adapted from the original television scripts for the first TV series. Lesley Dunlop played Zoë throughout and Rebecca Lacey returned in the role of Hilary after leaving the TV show after the fifth series. The radio series was broadcast on BBC Radio 2 on Thursdays at 9 p.m. between 23 April and 28 May 1998.

== Characters ==
- Alec Callender (Anton Rodgers) – a widowed Scottish solicitor who tries to balance his work, his family and his new romance with a much younger woman, Zoë. Alec idolises Perry Mason, and has a "signed" photo reading "Cheers, Alec, let's crack open a case sometime. Perry." He wishes his cases could be more exciting, like Perry's, but instead the most excitement he sees is the occasional divorce.
- Zoë Angell (Eve Matheson series 1–2, Lesley Dunlop series 3–6 and radio adaptation) – a feisty PE teacher, who divorced her husband after discovering he had been having an affair. She briefly dated the boys' PE teacher, Roy Morgan Jones, but the relationship is not serious and ends almost as quickly as it begins.
- Miles Henty (Clive Francis on TV, series 1–2, Charles Collingwood on radio) – Alec's surviving partner (Semple died years earlier, though his name is still on the door), who is a bit of a womaniser, even though he is married to a sculptor named Annabelle. He initially encourages Alec to take Zoë out on a date. Initially, he is the third main character appearing in the opening credits. In series 2, he only appears in the first episode. In the series 3 premiere, it is mentioned that he no longer works at the solicitors, despite his name still appearing on the door, suggesting he is still a partner.
- Vera Flood (Frances White) – The senior secretary who comes across as prim and bookish, but has secretly written a romance novel using a pseudonym. Her love life is not as active as the other characters, especially in the beginning, but she eventually marries a man named Gerald Tipple.
- Hilary (series 1–5 and radio adaptation) (Rebecca Lacey) – the ditzy and scatterbrained junior secretary. She is the exact opposite in every way to Miss Flood, from her personality to the way she dresses. She has a long-standing relationship with boyfriend Derek, who appears onscreen, perhaps only once in a later episode. Later, she is briefly engaged to Miss Flood's nephew, Anthony. She is written out, offscreen, at the start of the sixth series, with the character said to have moved to the Isle of Wight, due to actress Rebecca Lacey choosing to focus on pursuing larger film roles. Writer Paul Mendelson pitched a spin-off series around the character of Hillary, both to allow Lacey more flexibility around potential film projects, and to capitalise on the character's popularity with viewers, but the project was not given the green light.
- Rosie McConachie (series 6) (Ashley Jensen) – Replaces Hilary.
- Jamie Callender (Paul Venables on TV, Benedict Sandiford on radio) – Alec's son, an easy-going bachelor, who approves of his father's relationship with Zoë. He has a strong sense of humour and is seldom in a bad mood. He is a bit of a free spirit and lightens any scene he is in. He starts as a law student and takes over for Mr. Henty as Alec's partner after he gets his licence. He is the polar opposite of his sister.
- Debbie (Chrissie Cotterill) – Zoë's sister. While she does not completely approve of their relationship, she is more tolerant of it than most of the family. She works in her parents' greengrocery store and has a long-term relationship with the much talked about, but never seen Trevor, who works nights. She is primarily Zoë's sounding board.
- Dot Burgess (Kate Williams) – Zoë's opinionated mother. She has quite a bit in common with Alec and likes him, but does not approve of her daughter's relationship with him. She has infrequent appearances. Dot owns a greengrocer's with Zoë's father Barry (Ronnie Stevens), from whom she later separates briefly before reconciling to the strains of "Cherry Pink and Apple Blossom White".
- Simone Trevelyan (Carolyn Pickles) – Alec's daughter. Simone is married to a vicar named Bill and has a high moral standard that borders on prudish. Simone's surname is revealed in the second episode of the third series. She is vehemently opposed to her father's relationship with Zoë, especially when they purchase a house a little too close for comfort to the vicarage, but slowly warms to her over the series.
- Fleur (series 5 and 6) (Sophie Louise Collinson) (series 5 episode 1), (Natalie Boonarec) (episode 2), and (Charlotte Perry) (episodes 3–6) – Alec and Zoë's daughter, who is born in the first episode of the fifth series.

== Episodes ==
=== Series 1 ===
Note: The original run of series 1 had a different opening credits sequence, partly featuring an animated oak tree through the different seasons of the year, as well as a slightly different recording of the theme song. A repeat run of the first series that began in August 1990 replaced these with the opening visuals from the second series (which had also incorporated a number of shots from the first series). All later repeats and subsequent DVD releases continue to use the second-series version of the opening.

Episode number	Broadcast date	Title	Description	Song in the title
01 – 1.1 (Pilot)	2 April 1989	"It Never Entered My Mind"	Zoë Angell is a 26-year-old PE teacher seeking a divorce from her errant milkman husband. In achieving this she visits a solicitor called Alec Callender, a 53-year-old widower. At first things go wrong between them and Zoë storms out, but a chance meeting in a pub with Alec's son draws Alec and Zoë together, starting something that will have a tremendous effect on both of their lives.	The very first episode takes its title from a song from the 1940 musical Higher and Higher by Lorenz Hart and Richard Rodgers.
02 – 1.2	9 April 1989	"Fools Rush In"	Alec arranges a lunch meeting with Zoë in order to discuss her divorce. They are both attracted to each other but sense that they are getting in too deep. However, when confronted later by a predatory widow, Alec finally decides to ask Zoë out.	Written by Johnny Mercer and Rube Bloom, originally performed by Glenn Miller.
03 – 1.3	16 April 1989	"Send in the Clowns"	Alec and Zoë are due to go and see Bottoms Up, a musical version of A Midsummer Night's Dream, but Zoë sprains her ankle and is unable to go. In attempting to cheer her up, Alec succeeds in making an ass of himself in front of Zoë's parents.	A Grammy award-winning song by Stephen Sondheim, featured in his 1973 musical A Little Night Music.
04 – 1.4	23 April 1989	"Anything You Can Do"	Overcoming their mutual embarrassment over Alec's performance in front of Zoë's parents, Zoë invites Alec to her flat for dinner. But what do they have in common? What will they talk about? Both make attempts to read up on the other's interests, but the evening still looks like a disaster.	From Annie Get Your Gun (1946) by Irving Berlin.
05 – 1.5	30 April 1989	"They Didn't Believe Me"	It is Alec's 54th birthday and he decides that it is time that Zoë met his family, especially his daughter Simone, a vicar's wife with very strict principles. So he invites Zoë along to a Sunday dinner at Simone's. What will she make of Alec and Zoë's relationship?	From The Girl From Utah (1914) by Herbert Reynolds and Jerome Kern.
06 – 1.6	7 May 1989	"There's A Small Hotel"	Alec invites Zoë to his home for dinner, and although they get on very well the house still seems haunted by memories of Alec's wife, so Alec intends to take Zoë away to a small hotel that he knows. Meanwhile, Miss Flood suspects that Mr. Henty is also going away for the weekend—with Hilary.	Originally from Jumbo (1935) by Lorenz Hart and Richard Rodgers, subsequently reused in On Your Toes (1936).

=== Series 2 ===
Episode number	Broadcast date	Title	Description	Song in the title
07 – 2.1	4 January 1990	"What Kind of Fool Am I?"	Zoë's decree nisi has finally come through, meaning that she is actually divorced. Alec believes that this something to celebrate, but Zoë is not quite so sure.	From Stop the World – I Want to Get Off (1961) by Leslie Bricusse and Anthony Newley.
08 – 2.2	11 January 1990	"I Remember It Well"	Alec meets Zoë's parents for the first time without a horse's head on. They get on so well that Zoë feels left out. Has she fallen down the age gap? And has Alec noticed?	From Gigi (1958) by Alan Jay Lerner and Frederick Loewe.
09 – 2.3	18 January 1990	"You're Driving Me Crazy"	Zoë decides to learn to drive and with Alec teaching her their relationship is at times under considerable stress. Zoë's birthday is approaching and she suspects that Alec is going to buy her a car. Meanwhile, Hilary suspects that Miss Flood has got herself a boyfriend and Semple, Callender and Henty receive through the post a romantic novel by one Elvira Storm. Are these two things connected?	From Smiles (1930) by Walter Donaldson.
10 – 2.4	25 January 1990	"Time After Time"	Zoë is not seeing much of Alec, who seems to be tired much of the time after his exertions with Zoë, and this leads to Zoë asking him to move into her flat with her. Meanwhile, there is trouble brewing at the office when Alec suspects Miss Flood of being a drugs baron.	From It Happened in Brooklyn (1947) by Sammy Cahn and Jule Styne.
11 – 2.5	1 February 1990	"There's A Place For Us"	Alec is still undecided about moving into Zoë's flat: is this because it is so small when compared with his house? Meanwhile, after a disagreement with her parents over Derek, Hilary has left home and temporarily moved in with Miss Flood.	Taken from West Side Story (1961) by Leonard Bernstein and Stephen Sondheim, although the song is actually called "Somewhere".
12 – 2.6	8 February 1990	"No Other Love"	Alec and Zoë are now living together, but there are troubles on the horizon. A new American teacher has arrived at Eldon High and is working closely with Zoë on the school play. Jealousy rears its ugly head and Alec believes that he is going to lose Zoë to a younger man. These events coincide with the return to Pinner of "Dangerous" Dollie Capper, an old flame of Alec's.	From Me and Juliet (1953) by Richard Rodgers and Oscar Hammerstein.
13 – 2.7	15 February 1990	"My Funny Valentine"	Alec and Zoë have split up, very inappropriately, as St Valentine's Day is approaching. Alec is so miserable at the office that Hilary decides to try some matchmaking, but things go wrong, and she only succeeds in losing her job. Note: This episode is the last appearance of Eve Matheson as Zoë.	From Babes in Arms (1937) by Lorenz Hart and Richard Rodgers.

=== Christmas Special ===
Episode number	Broadcast date	Title	Description	Song in the title
14 – Sp	31 December 1990	"I'll See You in My Dreams"	It is approaching the 25th anniversary of Alec becoming a solicitor and he is becoming bored of dealing just with conveyances and divorces and he wishes for just one big case. There are a number of break-ins at solicitors' offices in the area, including Semple, Callender and Henty, giving Alec the chance to indulge in his Perry Mason fantasies. Note: Christmas special with 60-minute running time. First appearance of Lesley Dunlop as Zoë. Most of the cast play dual roles in Alec's recurring dream where he is Perry Callendar.	The 1925 title song was written by Gus Kahn.

=== Series 3 ===
Episode number	Broadcast date	Title	Description	Song in the title
15 – 3.1	7 January 1991	"That'll Be The Day"	Two anniversaries coincide; Miss Flood has bought some flowers because it is the anniversary of Buddy Holly's death, and Alec and Zoë have been together for one year. Everyone, except Zoë, is starting to think that this would be an opportune moment for the couple to announce their wedding date.	For once the actual song is directly relevant to the content of the episode, as well as just being an appropriate title, since it is a 1957 hit by Buddy Holly's band, The Crickets.
16 – 3.2	14 January 1991	"The Look of Love"	Alec has sold his house, so he and Zoë are looking for a new home, but they are both looking for different things in a house. Meanwhile, with Miss Flood taking time off to look after her mother, Hilary has made some changes to the office.	Written by Burt Bacharach for the film Casino Royale, in which it was performed by Dusty Springfield.
17 – 3.3	21 January 1991	"Too Close For Comfort"	Alec and Zoë have bought a house together—and it just happens to be in the same street as Simone's vicarage. Alec is having problems at home and at work; he has employed a cowboy builder, Hilary is attempting to learn Esperanto, and Jamie appears to be getting involved with a client.	From the Sammy Davis Jr. Broadway musical Mr. Wonderful (1956) by Jerry Bock.
18 – 3.4	28 January 1991	"It's All in the Game"	There is competition in the air, be it chess, croquet or Zoë going for promotion at work. Meanwhile, the arrival in Pinner of Miss Flood's nephew starts to distract Hilary from her work and her previously beloved Derek.	A 1958 hit for Tommy Edwards, written by Carl Sigman and Charles G. Dawes.
19 – 3.5	4 February 1991	"The Way You Look Tonight"	Alec's French brother-in-law is due to visit Pinner, and Zoë is preparing to live up to everything she has been told about Alec's late wife. Meanwhile, Jamie is finding work at Semple, Callender and Henty too boring, and is preparing to leave.	Written by Jerome Kern and Dorothy Fields for the Fred Astaire film Swing Time (1936).
20 – 3.6	18 February 1991	"Feelings"	Jamie is not pulling his weight at the office and Alec is getting close to firing him. However, he soon finds out why and Zoë sees a side of Alec that she has not seen before. Meanwhile, Hilary is intrigued to discover that Miss Flood is seeing a gentleman friend.	Originally a song in Portuguese by Mauricio Kaiserman and Thomas Fundera, with subsequent English lyrics by Morris Albert in 1975.
21 – 3.7	25 February 1991	"I Guess I'll Have To Change My Plans"	Passions and desires are appearing in the office; is it between Jamie and Hilary, Alec and Hilary, or still Alec and Zoë? It would appear to be the latter, especially when Zoë announces that she is pregnant. She then springs a surprise on Alec, and Miss Flood gets a shock from Hilary and Anthony.	From The Little Show (1929) by Arthur Schwartz and Howard Dietz.

=== Series 4 ===
Episode number	Broadcast date	Title	Description	Song in the title
22 – 4.1	8 March 1992	"This Could Be The Start of Something Big"	Alec and Zoë return from the start of their honeymoon to find that Simone is also pregnant, and there is a war zone in the office, as Miss Flood is still objecting to Hilary's engagement to her nephew.	The theme song of 1950s comedian and entertainer Steve Allen.
23 – 4.2	15 March 1992	"Just Like A Woman"	Alec believes that Zoë is not capable of doing all of the housework in her condition, so when Clothilde, his French niece, wants to come to Britain, he employs her as an au pair. Meanwhile, at the office, Miss Flood is behaving very strangely.	A 1966 hit for Bob Dylan.
24 – 4.3	22 March 1992	"I'm Old Fashioned"	Alec has a new client, Peter Charles, who plays Inspector Dangerfield in a popular TV series. At home, Zoë accuses Alec of being anti-gay when he objects to her working with a homosexual colleague. Meanwhile, Miss Flood is nervous at the prospect of meeting Gerald's daughters, so Hilary decides to lend a hand.	A song by Jerome Kern and Johnny Mercer that features in the 1942 movie You Were Never Lovelier.
25 – 4.4	5 April 1992	"The Party's Over"	Miss Flood, Gerald, Hilary and Jamie are spending an evening at Alec and Zoë's playing a murder mystery game. Everything seems to be going well, but tragedy is just around the corner.	From Bells Are Ringing (1958) by Jule Styne and Betty Comden.
26 – 4.5	12 April 1992	"The Crying Game"	Everyone is very upset about Zoë's miscarriage, seemingly except Zoë herself. Jamie's new girlfriend inspires Hilary to try and win back Derek, resulting in a new addition to the Callender household.	A 1964 hit for Dave Berry, which also gave its title to the 1992 film which in turn featured a cover of the song by Boy George.
27 – 4.6	19 April 1992	"Catch The Bouquet"	Miss Flood's wedding is rapidly approaching and she is starting to panic about it. Meanwhile, Alec and Zoë's relationship still has not returned to normal, and both Jamie and Debbie are having parent problems.	A hit for Doris Day in 1965.

=== Series 5 ===
Episode number	Broadcast date	Title	Description	Song in the title
28 – 5.1	10 March 1993	"Splish Splash"	Some time has passed and Zoë is heavily pregnant. She sparks some debate with Alec over the method of birth, favouring a water birth.	Recorded by Bobby Darin in 1958.
29 – 5.2	17 March 1993	"Baby Love"	A proud father again, Alec is taking a lot of paternity leave, leaving Jamie too much work at the office and driving Zoë crazy at home. But Zoë's plan to drive him back to work is in danger of backfiring.	A well-known hit by The Supremes from 1964.
30 – 5.3	24 March 1993	"School Days"	Alec infuriates Zoë by putting Fleur's name on a waiting list for a public school without consulting her.	A hit for Chuck Berry in 1957.
31 – 5.4	31 March 1993	"Who Can I Turn To?"	Roy Morgan Jones has proposed to Debbie, and she faces a difficult decision choosing between him and her current boyfriend Trevor. Zoë is clearly against having Roy as a brother-in-law, and when Debbie goes to Alec for legal advice she sees a chance to use him to influence her sister. Meanwhile, Vera is apprehensive as Jamie attempts to modernise the office.	Written by Leslie Bricusse and Anthony Newley and a hit in 1964 for Tony Bennett.
32 – 5.5	7 April 1993	"Let There Be Love"	Zoë is suffering from post-natal depression and is fed up with being stuck at home, with Alec being on the receiving end. Meanwhile, Hilary enters many competitions and Alec is attempting to win an important new contract from a very boring building society manager.	Written by Ian Grant and Lionel Rand, and originally a hit for Nat King Cole in 1962.
33 – 5.6	14 April 1993	"The Best Is Yet To Come"	Fleur's christening is approaching and Alec and Zoë disagree over who should be godmother. Meanwhile, Hilary believes she is pregnant, and Alec has health problems.	Written by Carolyn Leigh and Cy Coleman, and originally recorded by Frank Sinatra.

=== Series 6 ===
Episode number	Broadcast date	Title	Description	Song in the title
34 – 6.1	22 April 1994	"Nice Work If You Can Get It"	With Hilary having moved to the Isle of Wight, Vera is having difficulties finding a replacement secretary. To Jamie and Alec's horror, Simone is temporarily filling in. Meanwhile, there is conflict in the Callender household over Zoë's wish to return to work.	Written by George and Ira Gershwin and featured in the 1937 movie A Damsel in Distress.
35 – 6.2	29 April 1994	"Take Good Care of My Baby"	With Zoë back at school, the Callenders need someone to look after Fleur during the day. They try newspaper adverts and an exclusive nanny agency, but the solution is closer than they imagine.	A 1961 hit for Bobby Vee.
36 – 6.3	6 May 1994	"Son of My Father"	The school is organising a series of talks on careers, and Zoë wants Alec to talk about being a solicitor. Meanwhile, Jamie has become disillusioned with the profession and wants to leave it, to Alec's disgust.	A 1971 hit for Chicory Tip.
37 – 6.4	13 May 1994	"Cherry Pink and Apple Blossom White"	Zoë's mother has left her husband and is staying with Alec and Zoë—a situation that Alec is exploiting. Meanwhile, Vera believes that Rosie is being conned by a modelling agency.	Originally an instrumental hit for Perez "Prez" Prado in 1955, it was subsequently given French lyrics by Jacques Larue, which were translated by Mack David.
38 – 6.5	20 May 1994	Let The Heartaches Begin	Alec is sceptical when Jamie introduces a new business plan. Meanwhile, Zoë is trying to fix her sister up on a blind date, but Alec is concerned that the young man is more interested in the wrong sister.	A 1967 hit for Long John Baldry.
39 – 6.6	27 May 1994	Until It's Time For You To Go	The 30th anniversary of Vera starting at the office is approaching, and Jamie is organising a surprise "This Is Your Life" party for her. When Alec attends it he has to put on a brave face, as he has left Zoë because of her relationship with Mark. Zoë turns up to the party late but she is determined to work things out with Alec. Zoë and Alec leave the party to talk.	As recorded by Elvis Presley.

== DVD release ==
May to December series one and series two are both available on DVD in the UK, distributed by Acorn Media UK.
