= Cinema Verity =

Former TV and film production company

Cinema Verity was a British independent television and film production company, founded in 1985 by Verity Lambert, the television producer, who named the company after herself and as a pun on the expression 'cinéma vérité'.

The company's first major venture was the 1988 feature film A Cry in the Dark, which was produced by Lambert herself and based on the infamous Azaria Chamberlain 'dingo baby' case in Australia in the early 1980s.

Thereafter, the company was active mainly in television, producing two sitcoms for BBC1, May to December (1989–94) and So Haunt Me (1992–94). It also co-produced the short-lived BBC soap opera Eldorado (1992–93).

Other work included the literary adaptation The Cazalets for BBC One in 2001. This programme was co-produced by actress Joanna Lumley, whose initial idea the adaptation had been.

The company was voluntarily dissolved in 2011.
