= Orpe (surname) =

Orpe is a surname. Notable people with the surname include:

- Michelle Orpe, British TV presenter, columnist and poker personality
- Tom Orpe (1900–?), English footballer

== See also ==
- Oppe
