= Richard Johns (producer) =

UK film and television producer

Richard Johns is a UK film and television producer. As well as producing many commercially successful and critically acclaimed films, he has helped discover and foster the next generation of directors and writers across the UK, Europe and the US.

== Career ==
After five years learning the producing trade from the ground up making corporate films and commercials, Richard’s TV work started in 1992 with regional ITV productions for Tyne Tees, Yorkshire, Granada and Border Television, working with partner Bharat Nalluri. The pair co-founded regional indie Pilgrim Films. Richard's feature film work started in 1995 with no-budget comic thriller Killing Time, directed by Nalluri and taken up by Columbia TriStar in a battle with Miramax Films and in which the pair discovered then student writer Neil Marshall. Johns went on to produce dramatic thriller Downtime in 1996 with director Nalluri and new writer Caspar Berry, in partnership with Stephen Woolley and Nik Powell’s Scala Films, and Channel Four Films. Hollywood called Richard next in the form of Nicolas Cage’s production shingle Saturn Films with the project Shadow of the Vampire. Richard was then asked to run a series of feature productions including Orlando Bloom vehicle The Calcium Kid for Working Title Films, Jennifer Love Hewitt-Dougray Scott romance The Truth About Love, and UK-Australian co-production Like Minds with Toni Collette, in which he spotted and cast the talent of then up-and-coming young British actors Eddie Redmayne and Tom Sturridge. In 2007 Johns developed and produced the powerful drama Dangerous Parking.

Richard Johns' film and television production company is Corona Pictures, which he co-founded with Rupert Jermyn. With Jermyn, he produced Craig Viveiros' darkly comic hitman road movie The Liability starring Tim Roth, Peter Mullan and Jack O’Connell, and Robert Heath's psychological thriller Truth or Dare. Both films found strong distribution market appetite and are now on release in over twenty four international territories. The company has built rapidly from this production base.

Currently, Richard Johns and Rupert Jermyn are developing a number of film and television projects. One of their big TV projects is BIRDS OF PREY, based on the best-selling novels by Wilbur Smith and adapted by Layer Cake writer JJ Connolly. BIRDS OF PREY is set against the backdrop of the New World that is Africa in the 17th century. This epic story chronicles the pioneering journey of the Courtney family as they battle to secure the clan’s fortunes in an exotic land where sea-faring empires, privateers, wild animals and settled African tribes and nations fight it out for control of the land and its spectacular treasures. The series is being distributed and co-financed by Fremantle Media.

Johns is a partner at TV documentary production company Think Tank Films, in partnership with film maker, travel writer and journalist Kevin Rushby. He is past chair of the New Producers Alliance, a former board member of BAFTA North and the Northern Production Fund. He is visiting fellow at the Media School, Bournemouth University, and a voting member of BAFTA and the Production Guild of Great Britain.

== Filmography ==
=== Producer ===
- 1997: Downtime
- 1998: Killing Time
- 2000: Shadow of the Vampire
- 2004: Fat Slags
- 2004: The Calcium Kid
- 2005: The Truth About Love
- 2006: Like Minds
- 2007: Amelia and Michael (short)
- 2007: Dangerous Parking
- 2011: Saving the Leopard
- 2012: Truth or Dare
- 2013: The Liability
- 2023: The Shepherd
