= Poker Night Live =

- Logo
- Created by: PokerZone
- Starring: Various (See Presenters Below)
- Country of origin: United Kingdom

Production
- Running time: 240 Minutes

Original release
- Network: Pokerzone
- Release: February 2005 – May 2007

Poker Night Live is the United Kingdom's first live Internet poker show, broadcast between 2005 and 2007 on Pokerzone, usually between 9pm and 1am. Versions of it have been broadcast worldwide.

The show, in its live form, finished in May 2007, although repeats of past episodes were still broadcast until the closure of the Pokerzone channel the following year.

== Show Features ==
The show featured coverage of online poker cash games, single table "sit and go" tournaments, and multi-table tournaments. The games featured are from the Prima Poker network of sites, and are broadcast with a short delay, with all players' cards visible. The presenters also discuss viewers' emails and text messages on poker issues.

A regular feature from February, 2006 was the "Beat The Presenter" tournament, in which one of the presenters plays a single table tournament while the programme is being broadcast, and then analyses their play along with their co-presenter after it is completed.

In 2006, Poker Night Live offered its regular online players the chance to win places in a special PokerBowl show. The six qualifiers visited the PokerZone studio to play in a "live" tournament. The show was broadcast in September 2006 with Ken "Snappit" Hawkins beating Andrew "Gilberto" Parkhouse heads up.

== Presenters & guests ==
=== Presenters ===
Throughout its run, the show featured a number of different presenters, some of them expert players and others relatively new to the game. Usually the show was presented by one of the female hosts alongside one of the poker experts. When the show started, the hosts knew little about poker, however, their knowledge improved as the show went on.

Hosts on the UK version of Poker Night Live included:

- Lynsey Horn
- Michelle "The Night Nurse" Orpe
- Kara Scott

The poker experts on the UK version included:

- Mark Banin
- Caspar Berry
- James Browning
- John Clark
- Malcolm "The Rock" Harwood
- Alex Hyndman
- Tony "tikay" Kendall
- Barry "The Bully" Martin
- "Dr Tom" Sambrook
- Nick Wealthall
- Greg "Axxeman" Winters
- Michelle "Night Nurse" Orpe

=== Special guests ===
Guests in the commentary box have included:

- Kevin O'Connell
- Victoria Smirnoff
- Nic Szeremeta
- Antonio Esfandiari
- Phil Laak
- The Hendon Mob
- Dave Ulliott
- Johnny Chan
- Simon "Aces" Trumper
- Steve Davis

=== Celebrity players ===
Several celebrities have been known to play on the TV broadcast tables, including:

- Nick Bateman (Former Big Brother contestant)
- Roberto Conte (Former Big Brother contestant)
- Charles Ingram (Who Wants to Be a Millionaire? million winner, convicted of deception)
- Ewen Macintosh (Actor)
- Grub Smith (TV presenter)
- Phil Taylor (Darts champion)

== Canadian version ==
In February 2006, a Canadian version was created for Casino and Gaming Television (now called GameTV). The Canadian version ran for two hours, instead of the four-hour run-time of the UK show. The format was similar with more focus on Sit and Go tournaments and No Limit Cash tables featuring Canadian players. The show aired live Wednesday to Sunday at 11:00 p.m. to 1:00 a.m. EST. Repeated episodes were aired Monday and Tuesday at 11:00 p.m. and 7 days a week from 4:30 p.m. to 6:30 p.m.

The show was cancelled in December 2006 when CGTV was rebranded to GameTV.

Presenters on the Canadian version have included:

- Tina Teggart (Host)
- John "Johnny T" Tokatlidis (Host/Expert)
- Devin "Downtown Devo Brown" Armstrong (Expert)
- Lou Gazzola (Expert)
- Audrey Audet (Expert)
- Antonio "The Magician" Esfandiari (Celebrity Expert)
- Gail Ordogh (Host)
