= Xanadu Beach Resort & Marina =

Resort and marina in the Bahamas

General information
- Opened: 1968; 58 years ago

The Xanadu Beach Resort & Marina, also known as the Xanadu Princess Resort & Marina, was a resort and marina on the island of Grand Bahama in the Bahamas. Built in 1968, the resort was purchased by Howard Hughes in 1972 and was for several years the most celebrated resort in the Caribbean and served as a hideaway for the Hollywood jet set of the era. The resort comprises 20 acres (81,000 m^{2}) of beachfront, 215 rooms, and an 80 slip marina on the southern coast of Grand Bahama.

Since its opening, the resort and the events that took place within its grounds have appeared on the front pages of tabloids with visits from The Rat Pack, including Frank Sinatra and Dean Martin, as well as other celebrities of the era such as Cary Grant and Lucille Ball.

Hughes moved into the penthouse floors of the resort on 20 December 1973, living there until 10 February 1976, two months before his death. After Hughes' death, the resort was sold by the Summa Corporation to Tulsa businessman Robert B. Sutton around 1980. Sutton sent his CFO, Lynn Stringer to Freeport to oversee management of the hotel, and the hotel re-opened until Stringer died in Villa #5 in 1984. However, the penthouse floor in which Hughes lived for the last four years of his life remained empty for over 10 years, until the resort was purchased by Italian-Bahamian businessman Mario Donato and renovated in 1987.
