= Peter Howitt (actor) =

British actor and film director (born 1957)

- Born: 5 May 1957 (age 69); Manchester, Lancashire, England
- Occupations: Actor, film director and producer, screenwriter
- Years active: 1982–present
- Spouse: Lorraine Howitt (2001–present)
- Children: 2

Peter Howitt (/ˈhaʊɪt/; born 5 May 1957) is a British actor, film director, and comedian.

== Early life ==
Howitt was born on 5 May 1957, the son of Frank Howitt, a renowned Fleet Street journalist who, in 1963, broke the infamous Profumo Scandal by getting the exclusive story from call girl Christine Keeler of her illicit affair with a high ranking government minister.

Howitt grew up in Eltham, London in Tarnwood Park and Bromley, Kent. He was educated at Wyborne Primary School in New Eltham and Colfe's Grammar School in Lee, South London. While in Eltham he was a member of the Priory Players amateur dramatics group. Howitt spent a brief time at Paisley Grammar School in Paisley, Scotland in 1970. He studied at the Drama Studio London in 1976.

== Career ==
Howitt's first notable TV role was in the 1984–85 series of Yorkshire Television's long-running programme for schools How We Used To Live, where he starred alongside Brookside actress Sue Jenkins. He is best known for playing Joey Boswell in the first four series of BBC TV series Bread. In 1998, he wrote and directed his first film, Sliding Doors (1998). Since then, he has directed several films, including Antitrust (2001), Johnny English (2003), Laws of Attraction (2004), and Dangerous Parking (2008). He adapted the latter film from the novel by Stuart Browne, as well as produced and directed it, and played the lead role.

== Personal life ==
Howitt has two children, Luke (b. 1990) and Amy (b. 2008). He currently resides in Vancouver, British Columbia, Canada.

== Filmography ==
=== Film ===
Film credits of Howitt
Title	Year	Credited as				Role	Notes	Refs.
Title	Year	Actor	Director	Producer	Writer	Role	Notes	Refs.
In the Name of the Father	1993	Yes	No	No	No	Remand Prison Officer		
Some Mother's Son	1996	Yes	No	No	No	SAS Leader		
Stone Cold	1997	Yes	No	No	No	Conrad Stonebanks		
Sliding Doors	1998	Yes	Yes	No	Yes	Cheeky Bloke		
Antitrust	2001	Yes	Yes	No	No	Homeless Man		
Johnny English	2003	Yes	Yes	No	No	Man at the Coronation of Pascal Sauvage/Johnny English	Uncredited	
Laws of Attraction	2004	Yes	Yes	No	No	Client Client	Uncredited	
Dangerous Parking	2007	Yes	Yes	Yes	Yes	Noah Arkwright		
Reasonable Doubt	2014	No	Yes	No	No	None		
Scorched Earth	2018	No	Yes	No	No	None		

=== Television ===
Television credits of Howitt
Title	Year	Credited as			Role	Notes	Refs.
Title	Year	Actor	Director	Writer	Role	Notes	Refs.
Solo	1982	Yes	No	No	Raif	Episode: "Episode One"	
Studio	1983	Yes	No	No	Nick	Episode: "Art Begins at Forty"	
Jury	1983	Yes	No	No	Simmo	Episode: "Mick"	
Out on the Floor	1983	Yes	No	No	Nico	Television film	
Sharon and Elsie	1984	Yes	No	No	Michael Blake	Episode: "Episode Six"	
Punters	1984	Yes	No	No	Ansty	Television film	
How We Used To Live	1984–1985	Yes	No	No	Tom Selby		
Emmerdale	1985	Yes	No	No	Colin		
Constant Hot Water	1986	Yes	No	No	Roland		
Bread	1986–1988	Yes	No	No	Joey Boswell	39 episodes	
Family Fortunes	1989	Yes	No	No	Prince Charming	Episode: "Celebrity Christmas Special"	
Ball Trap on the Cote Sauvage	1993	Yes	No	No	Topless Topless	Television film	
Coasting	1990	Yes	No	No	Eddie Baker		
Civvies	1992	Yes	No	No	Steve Harris		
Party Time	1992	Yes	No	No	Terry	Short film	
Highlander	1993	Yes	No	No	Christoph Kuyler	Episode: "For Evil's Sake"	
Screen One	1993	Yes	No	No	Jim	Episode: "Royal Celebration"	
The Magician	1993	Yes	No	No	Herbie	Television film	
Class Act	1994	Yes	No	No	Antoine	Episode: "Episode Six"	
The Lifeboat	1994	Yes	No	No	Stanley Woods	Episode: "Homecomings"	
Tears Before Bedtime	1995	Yes	No	No	Ben Farlow		
The Perfect Match	1995	Yes	No	No	Dave	Television film	
Killing Me Softly	1995	Yes	No	No	Malcolm Thornton	Television film	
Eleven Men Against Eleven	1995	Yes	No	No	Steve Denton	Television film	
Frontiers	1996	Yes	No	No	Supt. Nick Jarratt		
Kiss and Tell	1996	Yes	No	No	Graham Ives	Television film	
Insiders	1997	Yes	No	No	Will Deans	Episode: "Guilty"	
Going to California	2001	No	Yes	No	None		
The Armstrong and Miller Show	2007	Yes	No	No	Dominic Dominic	Episode: "Episode Seven"	
Defying Gravity	2009	Yes	Yes	No	Trevor Williams		
Radio Rebel	2012	No	Yes	Yes	None	Television film	
Rogue	2013	No	Yes	No	None	Episode: "The Second Amendment"	
The Fixer	2015	No	Yes	No	None		

== Awards ==
- European Film Award (1998) – European Screenwriter (Sliding Doors)
- Empire Awards (1999) – Best British Director (Sliding Doors)
- Shanghai International Film Festival (2001) – Jin Jue Award for Best Director (AntiTrust)
- Shanghai International Film Festival (2001) – Jin Jue Award for Best Film (AntiTrust)
- Tokyo International Film Festival (2007) – Best Director (Dangerous Parking)
