= Summa Corporation =

Umbrella company for the business interests of Howard Hughes after 1972

- Company type: Subsidiary (1996–2004)
- Founded: 1972; 54 years ago
- Founder: Howard Hughes
- Defunct: 1996 (as an independent entity); 2004 (brand)
- Fate: Acquired by The Rouse Company and later General Growth Properties
- Successor: The Rouse Company; Howard Hughes Corporation
- Parent: The Rouse Company (1996–2004)

Summa Corporation was a holding company for the business interests of Howard Hughes after he sold the tool division of Hughes Tool Company in 1972. Its holdings included casino hotels, aviation businesses, and television channels. After Hughes's death in 1976, most of the company's assets were sold off, and it focused on developing the master-planned community of Summerlin, Nevada. Summa was renamed as The Howard Hughes Corporation in 1994. It was acquired by The Rouse Company in 1996.

== Properties ==
This holding company contained Hughes' varied investments including:

- KLAS-TV - the Las Vegas CBS affiliate, reportedly purchased because Hughes was dismayed that the station never played his favorite late-night movies.
- Hughes Airwest - a regional airline
- Hughes Sports Network
- Hughes Helicopters - a former division of Hughes Aircraft Company retained by Summa when the remainder of the aircraft business was donated to the Howard Hughes Medical Institute as its endowment
- Sands Hotel
- Frontier Hotel and Casino
- Landmark Hotel and Casino
- Castaways Hotel and Casino
- Desert Inn
- Silver Slipper
- Xanadu Beach Resort & Marina
- Hughes Nevada Mining
- General American Oil Company
- rights to films including Scarface and The Conqueror

== History ==
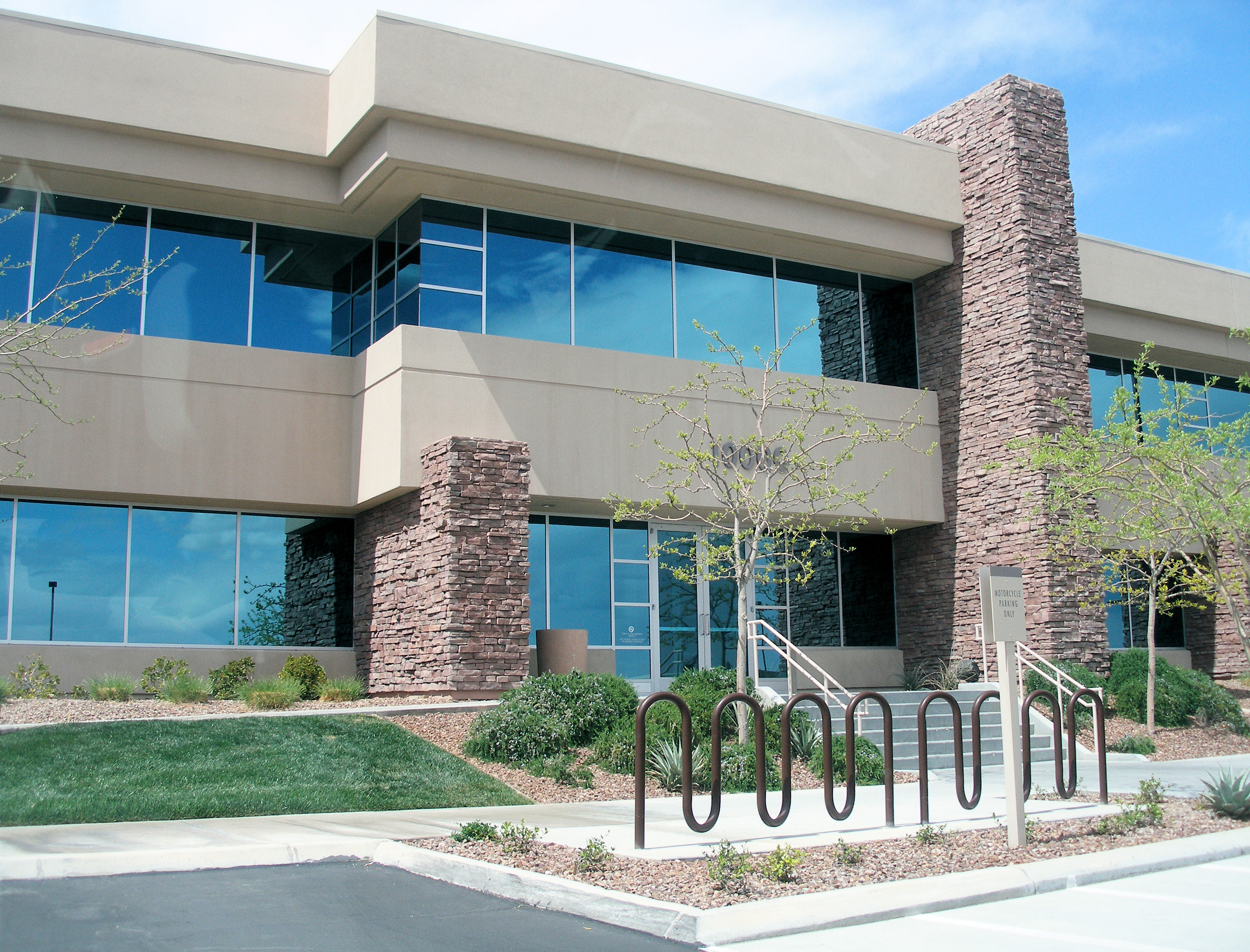
Howard Hughes Corporation's former headquarters in Summerlin (during the years it was a GGP subsidiary)

Before 1972, Summa Corporation was named Hughes Tool Company. It was established in 1908 as a manufacturer of oil drilling tools. Under the ownership of Howard Hughes, the company expanded over the years into various other businesses, including aviation, media, and casino hotels.

In 1972, the company sold its tool business to investors via an initial public offering as a new entity named Hughes Tool Company. At that time, the parent company changed its name to Summa Corporation. The name "Summa", Latin for "highest", was allegedly chosen by several of Hughes's employees without consulting him first. Hughes was allegedly dissatisfied, and preferred the name "HRH Properties", with the initials standing for both "Howard Robard Hughes" and "Hughes Resort Hotels", but his suggestion was ignored.

Howard Hughes died in 1976 at the age of 70, without a valid will. Administrators were appointed, led by his cousin William Lummis. Under Lummis, Summa began to liquidate most of its operations. Summa's money-losing mining interests in Nevada were sold by the end of 1976, while KLAS-TV and Hughes Sports Network were both sold in 1978. Hughes Airwest was sold to Republic Airlines for $38.5 million in October 1980, and Hughes Helicopters was sold to McDonnell Douglas for $470 million in January 1984. The hotel and casino properties were gradually sold off during the 1980s. As its original businesses were sold, Summa recast itself as a real estate developer, using the vast tracts of undeveloped land Hughes had amassed around Las Vegas as a starting point.

In September 1994, Summa Corporation was renamed The Howard Hughes Corporation, both to honor Howard Hughes and to fulfill his original intentions of keeping his name on the business.

In February 1996, Hughes's heirs sold the Howard Hughes Corporation to the Rouse Company for $520 million, plus half of any future profits from the company's undeveloped land holdings.

The Rouse Company was, in turn, acquired by General Growth Properties in November 2004. A new company named The Howard Hughes Corporation was spun off from GGP in 2010 and is now a developer of master-planned communities.
