= Caspar Berry =

English poker player, screenwriter, and actor (born 1973)

- Education: Cambridge University
- Occupation: Keynote business speaker
- Website: www.casparberry.com

Caspar Berry is a motivational and keynote business speaker specialising in the subjects of risk, decision making, innovation and leadership. He has previously worked as an actor, screenwriter for film and television, sports commentator, entrepreneur and professional poker player.

== Education ==
Caspar Berry was educated at the Royal Grammar School, Newcastle upon Tyne, before reading economics and then anthropology at Cambridge University.

== Early career ==
During his A levels, Berry was selected for the lead role, Gill, in the first two series of the BBC series Byker Grove. Berry also appeared in the Emmy Award winning film The Black Velvet Gown, the BBC television drama Spender and the British comedy film Bring Me the Head of Mavis Davis.

== Writer ==
Berry subsequently went into writing and directing. His first screenplay, Downtime, (which he wrote whilst still studying at Cambridge) was produced in 1996 by Film Four and starred Paul McGann. He went on to write Killing Time (1997) for Columbia Tri-Star and The Crow: Salvation (2000) for Dimension Films and Miramax. Berry also wrote for a number of television dramas, including Hollyoaks and Byker Grove.

== Poker player ==
Berry changed careers at age 25 and became a professional poker player in Las Vegas for three years, where he made a living in the $10–20 and $20–40 games in the Mirage.

== Broadcaster ==
Berry was the presenter and poker expert on a number of TV poker shows, most notably Poker Night Live (2005–2007) and Sky Poker (2007–2009), where he was one of the technical analysts. He also appeared on Sky Sports and was the poker strategy writer for Flush magazine.

Berry was an uncredited poker adviser on the 2006 James Bond movie Casino Royale, along with his credited Sky Poker co-host Dr Tom.

== Twenty First Century Media ==
Having returned to the UK in 2002, after his professional poker spell in Las Vegas, Berry co-founded the production company Twenty First Century Media. He managed the company for several years (in partnership with his colleague Sam Morton) before selling it in 2008 to Ten Alps.

== Business speaker ==
Following the sale of Twenty First Century Media, Berry began working as a trainer for The Mind Gym, before setting up his own speaking and training company where he now works with a range of businesses – predominantly as a speaker on calculated risks, decision making and innovation.
