= Downtime (film) =

- Directed by: Bharat Nalluri
- Written by: Caspar Berry
- Produced by: Richard L. Johns
- Starring: Paul McGann; Susan Lynch
- Edited by: Neil Marshall
- Music by: Simon Boswell
- Distributed by: FilmFour Distributors
- Release date: 13 February 1997 (UK)
- Running time: 90 minutes
- Country: United Kingdom
- Box office: £28,135 (UK)

Downtime is a 1997 British film directed by Bharat Nalluri and produced by Richard L. Johns. It stars Paul McGann and Susan Lynch.

== Plot ==
Former police psychologist Rob helps to save a young woman, Chrissy, when she is about to commit suicide by jumping off a 21st-storey balcony with her 4-year-old son, Jake. When he persuades her to go on a date, they are trapped with Jake and a neighbour called Pat in a lift because a drunken gang crashed into its engine room.
