= Dangerous Parking =

- Theatrical release poster
- Directed by: Peter Howitt
- Written by: Peter Howitt
- Produced by: Richard L. Johns, Peter Howitt
- Starring: Peter Howitt; Saffron Burrows; Sean Pertwee; Rachael Stirling; Alice Evans; Tom Conti
- Cinematography: Zoran Veljkovic
- Edited by: David Barrett
- Music by: Andre Barreau
- Release date: June 2007 (London Film Focus)
- Country: United Kingdom
- Language: English

Dangerous Parking is a 2007 Black comedy drama film written and directed by Peter Howitt based on the novel of the same name by Stuart Browne, who died in 1999.

== Plot ==
Dangerous Parking tells the story of Noah Arkwright, a cult director in the indie film world, whose life is dominated by alcohol, drugs, and casual sex.

Alcoholism and drug addiction have him firmly in their grasp - but Noah has no interest in acknowledging either until Kirstin, a reformed alcoholic, convinces him that he is heading for destruction and sets him on the path to reclaim himself.

With the help of his best friend Ray and his new girlfriend Claire, Noah attempts to get his life back together. And that is when Mother Nature deals him the cruelest blow of all.

== Cast ==
- Peter Howitt as Noah Arkwright
- Saffron Burrows as Claire Matteson
- Sean Pertwee as Ray Molina
- Rachael Stirling as Kirstin
- Tom Conti as Doc Baker
- Alice Evans as Etta
- Victor McGuire as Harry
- Vincenzo Nicoli as Greek Fisherman

== Production ==
Peter Howitt adapted the novel into a screenplay and directed the film, which he produced with Richard Johns.

Principal photography was completed on 16 November 2006; the film was completed in May 2007.

== Awards ==
- Tokyo International Film Festival (2007) - Best Director - Peter Howitt
