= Oppes =

Oppes is a surname. Notable people with the surname include:

- Antonio Oppes (1916–2002), Italian horse rider
- Salvatore Oppes (1909–1987), Italian horse rider, brother of Antonio

== See also ==
- Oppe
