= Michelle Orpe =

British television presenter

Michelle Orpe is a British TV presenter, Actress and Poker Personality.

== Career ==
=== Television hosting ===
Orpe began her career hosting 'Rem Con Raiders' for Image Wizard Television for Channel Five and moved on to host the FIA European Drag Racing Championships, aired on Sky Sports and Eurosports. After two years travelling around Europe hosting the drag racing she was asked to become lead presenter on the award-winning show 'Poker Night Live' for Pokerzone, which she hosted four nights a week during 2005-2007, as well as hosting a weekly poker news highlight show called "In Poker". She also wrote a column in Industry magazine 'Flush' focusing on her progression in the game. In 2008, alongside Poker Night Live, she hosted the world's toughest, full contact, action Motorsport - European Stock Car Racing, aired on Channel Five.

Orpe became known as one of the faces of 'Sky Poker', a dedicated poker channel on Sky Television channel 865 (alongside Helen Chamberlain, Richard Orford, Kara Scott, Tony Kendall, Ed Giddins and Norman Pace) where she spent two years from 2007-2009, before becoming the main TV Host for the 2009/2010 seasons of the Pokerstars 'European Poker Tour', aired on Channel Four. Alongside this she hosted the 'European Karting Championships' and Matchrooms 'Poker Millions VII', both aired on Sky Sports.

=== Poker ===
Orpe has played in various televised celebrity poker tournaments broadcast on Challenge and Five, including the 2008 PartyPoker.net 'Women's World Open II' where she won her heat and placed fifth in the final. She also appeared alongside Caroline Feraday, Willie Thorne and Brandon Block in the 2008 888.com UK Open and the 2009 PartyPoker.com European Open V alongside Du'aine Ladejo, Austin Healey and Rod Harrington. In 2008 she signed a sponsorship deal with Purple Lounge Poker Becoming their resident professional, she played in twelve Poker Tournaments over three months and cashed in four, she placed tenth in The Ladbrokes European Ladies Championships, second in a WPS - Ocean World Poker Showdown side event in Puerto Plata, fifth in the Women's World Open II and she also won her seat into an EPT event at the Vic Casino in London. Even though she had great success in the first few months of her sponsorship, she decided her heart was with TV and left Purple Lounge to host Sky Poker.

Michelle also wrote a weekly column for the learn section of global internet poker news company Pokernews.

In 2015 she became the Social Media and Live Events Host for partypoker UK in coalition with Dusk Till Dawn Poker Room in Nottingham. She ran the UK partypoker Facebook Community Forum and Twitter accounts.

=== Acting ===
In 2016 Michelle made her move into acting starring in numerous commercials and short films including Shadows (2015) and The Interrogation of Olivia Donovan (2016) Ellen in The Edge Catherine in Just a Day (2017) and Sandra in Stages (2019). She appeared as Pam in TV Pilot The Block (2018) and News Reporter in Deep Cuts (2019). Her upcoming projects include English feature film Dragged up Dirty (2023) produced by DT Film Productions and Australian Thriller The Killing Dark (2024).

Michelle produced her first short film Stages alongside film producer Donna Taylor of DT Film Productions.
