= Castaways (casino) =

Defunct hotel and casino in Las Vegas

- Location within Las Vegas Strip Location within Nevada
- Interactive map of Castaways
- Location: Paradise, Nevada, U.S.; 3320 South Las Vegas Boulevard; 36.122276°N 115.171944°W
- Opened: August 21, 1955 (Sans Souci hotel); October 23, 1957 (Sans Souci casino); September 1, 1963 (Castaways)
- Closed: July 20, 1987; 38 years ago
- Theme: Polynesia
- No. of rooms: 228 (as of 1987)
- Signature attractions: Gateway to Luck
- Casino type: Land-based
- Owner: Ben Jaffe (1963–1967); Hughes Tool Company (1967–1972); Summa Corporation (1972–1986); Steve Wynn (1986–87)
- Previous names: Sans Souci Hotel (1955–1963)
- Renovated in: 1957, 1963, 1969, 1971–72, 1981

The Castaways was a hotel and casino on the Las Vegas Strip in Paradise, Nevada. It began in the 1930s, as a small motel called Mountain View. It became the Sans Souci in 1939, and underwent several ownership changes in its early years. A hotel addition opened on August 21, 1955, when the property became the Sans Souci Hotel. A casino, showroom, and restaurant were eventually opened on October 23, 1957. These facilities closed less than a year later, due to financial problems, although the hotel continued operations. Following a bankruptcy reorganization, the shuttered facilities reopened in May 1960. However, the property soon closed due to further financial difficulties.

Investor Ben Jaffe purchased the Sans Souci and reopened it as the Polynesian-themed Castaways on September 1, 1963. A new signature attraction was a Jain temple replica referred to as the Gateway to Luck. Jaffe also added more hotel rooms. He served as landlord for the casino portion, which was operated by a separate group. The casino closed again in December 1964, and was briefly reopened a year later under a new operating group. Following another closure, it reopened in May 1967, and Jaffe sold the entire property later that year to Howard Hughes, marking his third Las Vegas casino purchase. Hughes owned it through Hughes Tool Company, and later through his Summa Corporation.

In 1986, casino owner Steve Wynn purchased the Castaways and nearby vacant property with plans to build a new resort on the land. The Castaways closed on July 20, 1987. Wynn's new resort, The Mirage, opened in 1989. The Castaways name would later be used for the Showboat Hotel and Casino on Boulder Highway, starting in 2001.

== History ==
=== Early years ===
The property began in the 1930s, as a small motel called the Mountain View Auto Court. In 1939, the motel was sold to W. R. Miller and Dr. Freeman H. Smith, who renamed it, the San Souci. They sold it to Burton Miller and his wife in 1941. The 16-room San Souci was sold again in 1946, to Las Vegas attorney H. Cleveland Schultz.

A grand opening for the renamed Sans Souci Hotel took place on August 21, 1955, following renovations which included a two-story, 82-room hotel and an Olympic-size swimming pool. Future additions were planned for the 12-acre property, including a casino, nightclub, and restaurant. The casino portion opened on October 23, 1957. It was operated by George E. Mitzell and Harold V. Hinds. The property also featured live entertainment in the new 400-seat Jamaica Room. At the end of 1957, Mitzell announced plans to add 100 additional rooms, although these did not materialize. In 1958, a meat company filed a $21,500 lawsuit against the Sans Souci for lack of payment. Saxophonist Charlie Ventura also filed a lawsuit, after suffering a fall on the casino's stage during a performance.

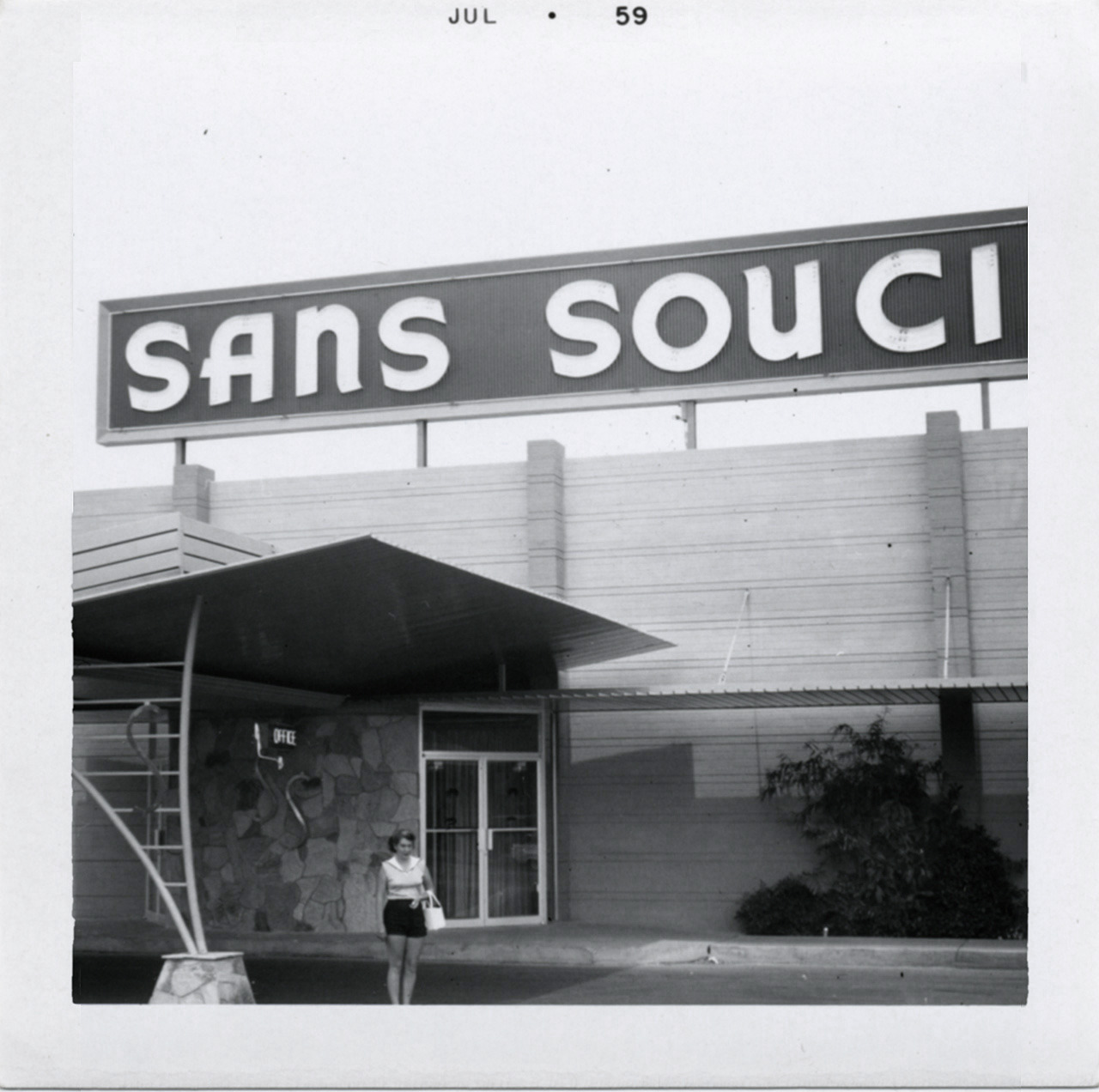
Sans Souci hotel entrance, July 1959

In July 1958, two Las Vegas men, Jerry Kastner and Arthur Rozen, agreed to invest a total of $75,000 in operating funds. Kastner ultimately purchased only $31,000 worth of casino stock, and later said that he pulled out of the deal because it had been misrepresented. The casino and showroom closed in August 1958, and the property filed for bankruptcy. Federal agents seized money from the Sans Souci for its failure to pay cabaret taxes. The hotel was unaffected. The Sans Souci later filed a $400,000 damages suit against Kastner, alleging that his pullout resulted in the property's bankruptcy. A court eventually ruled in Kastner's favor.

In 1959, a federal judge approved a reorganization plan which would include leasing the casino, showroom, restaurant and bar to a new group for five years, at $8,500 a month. The showroom reopened in May 1960, and the state approved the casino to add table games; it had only been licensed, the month prior, to operate slot machines. In August 1960, agents of the Internal Revenue Service seized 10 slot machines, which were considered contraband after the casino failed to purchase tax stamps.

The Sans Souci re-entered bankruptcy in November 1961, after four major creditors rejected financial negotiations. The property owned more than $900,000. It eventually closed and, in November 1962, was sold in a bankruptcy auction for $749,600. The new owner was Ben Jaffe, a Las Vegas investor and owner of the Tropicana.

=== Castaways (1963–1987) ===
Shortly after his purchase, Jaffe announced plans to rename the property as the Polynesian-themed Castaways, and to add additional rooms while remodeling the existing 82 units. Jaffe had previously built a popular Castaways motel in Miami Beach, Florida. Construction of new rooms was underway in 1963. That year, KLAS Radio relocated its headquarters to the Castaways. KVEG would later take its place.

The property reopened as the Castaways on September 1, 1963. The casino was operated by Mississippi oilman Ike P. LaRue and his business partner Everett Eugene McCarlie. LaRue was the brother of Fred LaRue, who also invested in the casino operation. Jaffe served as landlord to the group. The casino, restaurant, and bar were closed again on December 3, 1964, due to financial problems. The hotel continued operations, and the restaurant was eventually reopened. In June 1965, another new group proposed a $100,000 investment to reopen the casino and take over its operations from the LaRue group. The proposal was approved by the state, and the casino and showroom reopened in October 1965, before closing again three months later.

The casino reopened in May 1967, with Oliver Kahle as operator. Several months later, Howard Hughes reached an agreement to buy the Castaways, marking his third Las Vegas casino purchase. Hughes bought the entire property from Jaffe and took over Kahle's operating stake. The sale was approved by the Nevada Gaming Commission in October 1967, at a cost of $3.3 million. At the time, the casino had 10 table games and 152 slot machines. It was owned and operated by Hughes Tool Company, and would be the smallest of six Las Vegas casinos that Hughes eventually owned.

A larger showroom stage was added in 1969. The casino's table games were closed in October 1971, to allow for a $250,000 remodeling of the casino. The slot machines and hotel continued to operate. Work on the rest of the casino took place in 1972. That year, Summa Corporation was formed to oversee Hughes' casinos. A $2.5 million renovation and expansion concluded in 1981.

In October 1986, the Castaways and nearby vacant acreage was sold for $50 million to casino owner Steve Wynn, who planned to build a new resort on the land. In the meantime, Summa continued leasing the Castaways site and operating the hotel-casino. Real estate developer Donald Trump had previously discussed purchasing the Castaways, until Wynn made a better offer. Numerous VIPs, including Wynn, attended a farewell celebration at the casino on July 19, 1987, ahead of the property's closing the next day. Various items were given away as souvenirs, with the grand prize being a six-ton, 90-foot-long sign from the casino's east side.

At the time of its closing, the Castaways had 228 rooms and 650 employees. It was scheduled to be demolished in the months ahead to make way for Wynn's new resort, which opened as The Mirage in 1989. The Mirage's northern edge on Las Vegas Boulevard occupies the former Castaways property. The Castaways name would later be used for the Showboat Hotel and Casino on Boulder Highway, starting in 2001.

== Attractions ==
=== Gateway to Luck ===
In 1963, the Castaways added a Jain temple replica as a tourist attraction. It was originally built for the 1904 St. Louis World's Fair. The Castaways referred to the temple as the Gateway to Luck. The 14-ton structure was 35 feet high and included a winding staircase leading to a balcony. It was located behind the casino building in a fenced-off area, next to a wishing well.

In 1980, the Jain Center of Southern California (JCSC) learned of the replica's existence and its use as a tourist attraction, with which JCSC disagreed: "We believe the display of the temple this way is an insult". JCSC requested that the temple be donated, and Summa instead offered to sell it for $250,000, which was more than JCSC could afford. In 1987, amid the Castaways' closure, the temple was disassembled and donated to members of the Jain sect in Las Vegas. It has since been reconstructed at JCSC.

=== Entertainment ===
In its early years, the property featured women who performed shows while dressed as mermaids. In 1964, the Castaways debuted several shows in its new Samoa Room, including Bottoms Up, a musical comedy. It was produced by Breck Wall. Another show, Happy-Go-Lucky, starred Lili St. Cyr and Hank Henry. Watusi Scandals, a musical show featuring the Watusi dance, opened in 1965. Four years later, Wall opened another show called Cotton Club Revue '70. The Castaways also hosted comedians Redd Foxx and Pearl Williams.
