= Amateur Poker Association & Tour =

Amateur Poker Association & Tour (APAT)
- Sport: Poker
- Founded: 2006
- Country: United Kingdom & Europe
- Website: APAT.com

The Amateur Poker Association & Tour (APAT) is an organisation founded in England in 2006. It is Europe's largest organisation for recreational poker players, with a membership of over 20,000 players.

The "Association" element of the organisation is focused on consulting with gaming and industry bodies to enhance the player experience, with standardisation of rules, player friendly structures and event sponsorship at the top of its agenda.

The "Tour" element is primarily aimed at organising live poker tournaments in licensed venues across the United Kingdom, Ireland and other European countries. APAT has also hosted the APAT North American Amateur Poker Championship at the world famous Caesars Palace Casino in Las Vegas. APAT’s principal live events are differentiated from other organised Poker Tournaments in the UK by being fully dealer-dealt and featuring deep stacked, well-structured tournaments for a modest entry fee.

== Tournaments ==
All principal APAT Tour events are run to APAT’s standardised rules, with blind structures targeted on providing value for the players. Tour events are reported, in real time, via APAT’s websites and have also been streamed live via the internet for online viewing.

In addition, APAT organises a series of Online Poker Championship events and the APAT National Online League via its headline gaming sponsors. In 2012, APAT has announced the PokerStars.com National Online League.

== Additional products ==
=== World Championship of Amateur Poker (WCOAP) ===
The WCOAP is a five-day festival of poker which features a three-day World Amateur Poker Championship main event together with additional World Amateur Poker Championship side events. Side events include the World Amateur Team Championship and tournaments in other poker variants such as Stud, H.O.R.S.E. and Omaha and other formats such as Heads Up and Six Max.

=== Poker Circuit ===
Poker Circuit is an online news aggregator pulling together news from poker sites, operators, poker forums and players.

=== APAT Cash Tour ===
APAT test-trialled a cash tournament at the APAT European Amateur Championship (Season 6) event held in Brighton in late January 2012.

== National Amateur Champions ==
=== Season 1 ===
Event	Venue/City	Date	Winner
APAT English Amateur Poker Championship	(England) Broadway Casino, Birmingham	Friday 22 - Saturday 23 September 2006	(England) Daniel Phillips
APAT UK Amateur Poker Championship	(England) Aspers, Newcastle	Saturday 2 - Sunday 3 December 2006	(England) Max Ward
APAT Welsh Amateur Poker Championship	(Wales) Grosvenor Casino, Cardiff	Saturday 24 - Sunday 25 February 2007	(England) Lee Mulligan
APAT Scottish Amateur Poker Championship	(Scotland) Gala Maybury Casino, Edinburgh	Saturday 14 - Sunday 15 April 2007	(Scotland) Phil Starrs
APAT Irish Amateur Poker Championship	(Republic of Ireland) Fitzwilliam Card Club, Dublin	Saturday 2 - Sunday 3 June 2007	(Republic of Ireland) Jacques Kieft
APAT European Amateur Championship	(England) G Casino, Luton	Saturday 25 - Monday 27 August 2007	(Wales) Gareth Ower

=== Season 2 ===
Event	Venue/City	Date	Winner
APAT English Amateur Poker Championship	(England) Grosvenor Casino, Walsall	Saturday 3 - Sunday 4 November 2007	(England) Richard Offless
APAT UK Amateur Poker Championship	(England) G Casino, Manchester	Saturday 8 - Sunday 9 December 2007	(England) Simon Turton
APAT Welsh Amateur Poker Championship	(Wales) Grosvenor Casino, Cardiff	Saturday 12 - Sunday 13 January 2008	(England) Tim Magnus
APAT European Amateur Poker Championship	Poker Royale Card Casino, Wiener Neustadt, Austria	Saturday 22 - Sunday 23 March 2008	(England) Andy Kingan
APAT Scottish Amateur Poker Championship	(Scotland) Gala Maybury Casino, Edinburgh	Saturday 3 - Sunday 4 May 2008	(Wales) Jason Jones
APAT Irish Amateur Poker Championship	(Republic of Ireland) Fitzwilliam Card Club, Dublin	Saturday 14 - Sunday 15 June 2008	(Wales) Darren Shallis
APAT UK Team Championship - Team Prize	(England) G Casino, Blackpool	Saturday 19 - Sunday 20 July 2008	Bristol & South West Meetup
APAT UK Team Championship - Individual Prize	(England) G Casino, Blackpool	Saturday 19 - Sunday 20 July 2008	(Scotland) Mary Martin
APAT World Championship of Amateur Poker - Omaha	(England) Grosvenor Victoria Casino, London	Wednesday 27 August 2008	(England) Dave Howard
APAT World Championship of Amateur Poker - Razz	(England) Grosvenor Victoria Casino, London	Thursday 28 August 2008	(England) Michael Bodman
APAT World Championship of Amateur Poker - Stud	(England) Grosvenor Victoria Casino, London	Friday 29 August 2008	(England) Owen Rankin
APAT World Championship of Amateur Poker - Main Event	(England) Grosvenor Victoria Casino, London	Saturday 30 August - Monday 1 September 2008	(England) Nick Jenkins
APAT Masters Pro-Am	(England) G Casino, Luton	Saturday 4 - Sunday 5 October 2008	(England) Neil Blatchley
APAT European Team Championship - Individual Prize	(England) Grosvenor Casino, Brighton	Saturday 1 - Sunday 2 November 2008	(Republic of Ireland) Brendan Byrne
APAT European Team Championship - Team Prize	(England) Grosvenor Casino, Brighton	Saturday 1 - Sunday 2 November 2008	(Republic of Ireland) Ireland

=== Season 3 ===
Event	Venue/City	Date	Winner
APAT UK Amateur Poker Championship	(England) Grosvenor Casino, Walsall	Saturday 7 - Sunday 8 February 2009	(England) Steve Redfern
APAT Welsh Amateur Poker Championship	(Wales) Grosvenor Casino, Cardiff	Saturday 4 - Sunday 5 April 2009	(England) Simon Auckland
APAT Irish Amateur Poker Championship	(Republic of Ireland) Fitzwilliam Card Club, Dublin	Saturday 30 - Sunday 31 May 2009	(England) Brian Yates
APAT Scottish Amateur Poker Championship	(Scotland) Gala Maybury Casino, Edinburgh	Saturday 18 - Sunday 19 July 2009	(Scotland) Derek Murdie
APAT World Championship of Amateur Poker - Omaha	(England) Dusk Till Dawn, Nottingham	Thursday 27 August 2009	(England) Paul Pitchford
APAT World Championship of Amateur Poker - H.O.R.S.E.	(England) Dusk Till Dawn, Nottingham	Friday 28 August 2009	(England) Andrew Tracey
APAT World Championship of Amateur Poker - Main Event	(England) Dusk Till Dawn, Nottingham	Saturday 29 - Monday 31 August 2009	(England) Charles Mason
APAT English Amateur Poker Championship	(England) G Casino, Bolton	Saturday 24 - Sunday 25 October 2009	(England) John Kay
APAT European Team Championship - Team Prize	(England) G Casino, Luton	Thursday 19 - Friday 20 November 2009	Poland
APAT European Amateur Poker Championship	(England) G Casino, Luton	Saturday 21 - Sunday 22 November 2009	(England) Stuart Ward
APAT UK Amateur Team Championship - Team Prize	(England) Grosvenor Casino, Manchester	Saturday 23 - Sunday 24 January 2010	APAT Team
APAT UK Amateur Team Championship - Individual Prize	(England) Grosvenor Casino, Manchester	Saturday 23 - Sunday 24 January 2010	(England) Bill Wallace

=== Season 4 ===
Event	Venue/City	Date	Winner
APAT Welsh Amateur Poker Championship	(Wales) Aspers, Swansea	Saturday 20 - Sunday 21 March 2010	(Wales) Gareth Johns
APAT UK Amateur Poker Championship	(England) Grosvenor Victoria Casino, London	Saturday 17 - Sunday 18 April 2010	(Republic of Ireland) John Murray
APAT Central European Amateur Championship	Concord Card Casino, Vienna Simmering, Austria	Saturday 15 - Sunday 16 May 2010	(Austria) Christoph Kreindl
APAT Scottish Amateur Poker Championship	(Scotland) International Casino, Aberdeen	Saturday 19 - Sunday 20 June 2010	(Scotland) Scott Wilson
APAT Northern European Amateur Championship	Olympic Casino, Tallinn, Estonia	Saturday 31 July - Sunday 1 August 2010	(Estonia) Vladimir Fedotov
APAT World Team Championship - Team Prize	(England) Dusk Till Dawn, Nottingham	Thursday 26 August 2010	Wales
APAT World Championship of Amateur Poker - Heads Up	(England) Dusk Till Dawn, Nottingham	Thursday 26 August 2010	(England) Dave Howard
APAT World Championship of Amateur Poker - Stud	(England) Dusk Till Dawn, Nottingham	Friday 27 August 2010	(England) Ian Thompson
APAT World Championship of Amateur Poker - Omaha	(England) Dusk Till Dawn, Nottingham	Saturday 28 August 2010	(Netherlands) Max Kruis
APAT World Championship of Amateur Poker - 6 Max	(England) Dusk Till Dawn, Nottingham	Sunday 29 August 2010	(England) Colin Young
APAT World Championship of Amateur Poker - H.O.R.S.E.	(England) Dusk Till Dawn, Nottingham	Monday 30 August 2010	(England) Stephen Wintersgill
APAT World Championship of Amateur Poker - Main Event	(England) Dusk Till Dawn, Nottingham	Saturday 28 August - Monday 30 August 2010	(Wales) Ben Young
APAT Irish Amateur Poker Championship	(Republic of Ireland) Fitzwilliam Card Club, Dublin	Saturday 25 - Sunday 26 September 2010	(Republic of Ireland) Simon O'Hare
APAT English Amateur Poker Championship	(England) G Casino, Luton	Saturday 23 - Sunday 24 October 2010	(England) Tod Wood
APAT European Amateur Poker Championship	(England) G Casino, Coventry	Saturday 27 - Sunday 28 November 2010	(England) Brian Martin
APAT Southern European Amateur Championship	Casino de Lloret, Lloret, Spain	Saturday 15 - Sunday 16 January 2011	(Spain) Oriol Sanchez
APAT UK Amateur Team Championship - Team Prize	(England) G Casino, Bolton	Saturday 29 - Sunday 30 January 2011	London Poker Meetup
APAT UK Amateur Team Championship - Individual Prize	(England) G Casino, Bolton	Saturday 29 - Sunday 30 January 2011	(Scotland) Niall Farrell

=== Season 5 ===
Event	Venue/City	Date	Winner
APAT English Amateur Poker Championship	(England) G Casino, Coventry	Saturday 26 - Sunday 27 March 2011	(England) Mark Briggs
APAT UK International Home Team Championship - Team Prize	(England) Aspers, Newcastle	Thursday 21 - Friday 22 April 2011	Wales
APAT UK Amateur Poker Championship	(England) Aspers, Newcastle	Saturday 23 - Sunday 24 April 2011	(Wales) Ben Young
APAT Welsh Amateur Championship	(Wales) Les Croupier, Cardiff	Saturday 28 - Sunday 29 May 2011	(Poland) Lukas Daszynski
APAT UK Pub Poker Championship - Team Prize	(England) G Casino, Blackpool	Saturday 25 - Sunday 26 June 2011	Edgworth Cricket Club
APAT UK Pub Poker Championship - Individual Prize	(England) G Casino, Blackpool	Saturday 25 - Sunday 26 June 2011	(England) Tony Trippier
APAT Scottish Amateur Poker Championship	(Scotland) Gala Casino Merchant City, Glasgow	Saturday 30 - Sunday 31 July 2011	(Scotland) Grant Speirs
APAT World Championship of Amateur Poker - Stud	(England) Dusk Till Dawn, Nottingham	Thursday 25 August 2011	(England) Jonathan Seal
APAT World Amateur Team Championship - Team Prize	(England) Dusk Till Dawn, Nottingham	Thursday 25 - Friday 26 August 2011	Wales
APAT World Championship of Amateur Poker - Heads Up	(England) Dusk Till Dawn, Nottingham	Friday 26 August 2011	(England) Chris Peers
APAT World Championship of Amateur Poker - H.O.R.S.E.	(England) Dusk Till Dawn, Nottingham	Saturday 27 August 2011	(Wales) Paul McGuinness
APAT World Championship of Amateur Poker - 6 Max	(England) Dusk Till Dawn, Nottingham	Sunday 28 August 2011	(England) Liam Batey
APAT World Championship of Amateur Poker - Omaha	(England) Dusk Till Dawn, Nottingham	Monday 29 August 2011	(Italy) Andrea Lombardi
APAT World Championship of Amateur Poker - Main Event	(England) Dusk Till Dawn, Nottingham	Saturday 27 - Monday 29 August 2011	(England) David Garden
APAT Irish Amateur Poker Championship	(Republic of Ireland) Macau Sporting Club, Cork	Saturday 24 - Sunday 25 September 2011	(Republic of Ireland) Bobby O'Donnell
APAT UK Amateur Team Championship - Team Prize	(England) G Casino, Luton	Thursday 26 August 2011	Gambling Network Forum
APAT UK Amateur Team Championship - Individual Prize	(England) G Casino, Luton	Thursday 26 August 2011	(England) Nick Mazur
APAT American Amateur Poker Championship	(United States) Caesar's Palace, Las Vegas, USA	Saturday 19 - Sunday 20 November 2011	(Scotland) Michael Paterson
APAT UK Open Championship	(England) G Casino, Manchester	Saturday 3 - Sunday 4 December 2011	(England) George Downie
APAT European Amateur Poker Championship	(England) Rendezvous Casino, Brighton	Friday 20 - Saturday 21 January 2012	(England) Marie Sherwood

== Headline gaming sponsors ==
- Season 1: PokerStars
- Season 2: Blue Square
- Season 3: Blue Square
- Season 4: Betfair
- Season 5: 888poker
- Season 6: William Hill
- Season 7: Coral Poker
- Season 8: Coral Poker
- Season 9: Coral Poker
- Season 10: Grosvenor Casinos
- Season 11: Grosvenor Casinos
- Season 12: Grosvenor Casinos

== Officials ==
- Managing Director: Des Duffy
- Chairman: Tony Kendall
- Director of Live Events: Richard Prew

== Partnerships ==
In 2023, the Amateur Poker Association & Tour (APAT) entered into a partnership with online poker operator GGPoker. According to the terms of the partnership, GGPoker commenced hosting online events for APAT members, such as Championship tournaments and qualifiers for live events. As part of the collaboration, the annual World Championship of Amateur Poker (WCOAP) moved to an online setting, hosted only on the GGPoker platform.
