= The Mirage =

Defunct casino hotel resort in Las Vegas, Nevada

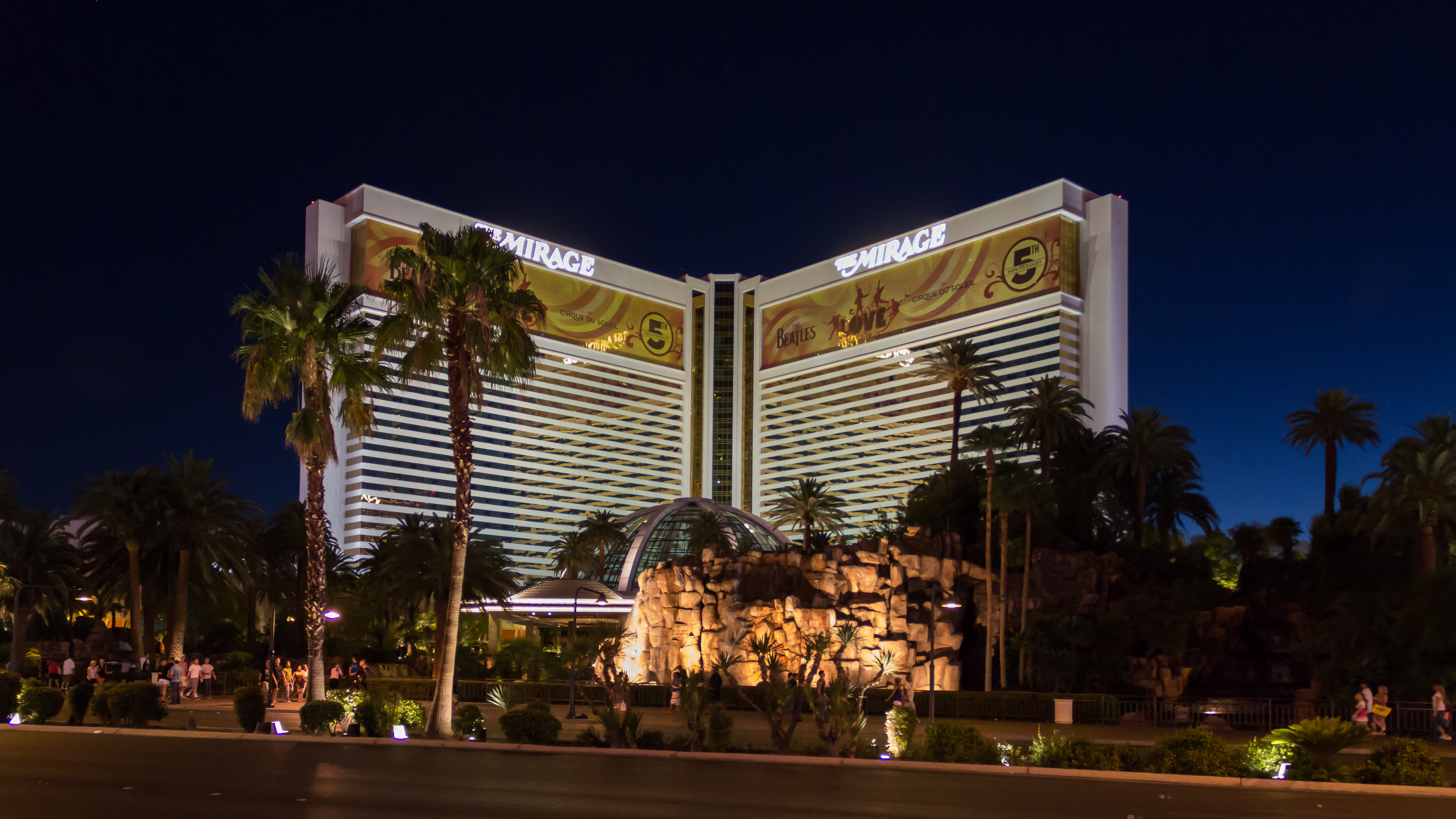
- The resort at night in July 2012

- Location within Las Vegas Strip Location within Nevada
- Interactive map of The Mirage
- Location: Paradise, Nevada, U.S.; 3400 South Las Vegas Boulevard; 36°07′16″N 115°10′31″W
- Opened: November 22, 1989; 36 years ago
- Closed: July 17, 2024; 2 years ago
- Theme: Polynesian
- No. of rooms: 3,044
- Gaming space: 90,548 sq ft (8,412.2 m^{2})
- Permanent shows: Siegfried & Roy (1990–2003); Love (2006–2024); Center Stage Comedy
- Signature attractions: Volcano; Siegfried & Roy's Secret Garden and Dolphin Habitat; Aquarium lobby
- Notable restaurants: Renoir (1999–2004); B.B. King's Blues Club (2009–2012); Tom Coliccio's Heritage Steak; Osteria Costa; The Still Crafts, Drafts & Eats; Otoro
- Casino type: Land-based
- Owner: Mirage Resorts (1990–2000) (Note: Known as Golden Nugget, Inc. until 1991.); MGM Resorts International (2000–2016) (Note: Known as MGM Mirage from 2000 to 2010.); MGM Growth Properties (2016–2022); Vici Properties (final owner)
- Operating license holder: Hard Rock International (2022–2024) (Note: Previously operated by Mirage Resorts and later MGM.)
- Architect: Joel Bergman
- Renovated in: 1995, 2002, 2004–2006, 2008
- Website: mirage.com

The Mirage is a defunct casino hotel resort on the Las Vegas Strip in Paradise, Nevada, United States. The 65-acre (26 ha) property included a 90,548 sq ft (8,412.2 m^{2}) casino and 3,044 rooms.

Golden Nugget, Inc., led by developer Steve Wynn, purchased the future land of the Mirage in 1986. A hotel-casino, the Castaways, occupied a portion of the property and was demolished to make way for the Mirage. The resort opened on November 22, 1989, after two years of construction. It was the world's most expensive resort, completed at a cost of $630 million. It was also among the world's largest hotels. The Mirage was the first megaresort to open on the Las Vegas Strip, and its success prompted a building boom in the 1990s for other large resorts along the Strip.

The Mirage opened with several non-traditional attractions for a Las Vegas casino, including animal habitats for dolphins and tigers, and an indoor tropical forest display. Its primary attraction was an artificial volcano that erupted nightly, providing free entertainment in front of the resort. In 1990, the Mirage debuted a magic show by Siegfried & Roy, who performed there for nearly 14 years. The resort also hosted Cirque du Soleil's first Las Vegas show, Nouvelle Expérience, which opened in 1992. Cirque du Soleil would return to the property in 2006, with the debut of Love, a show featuring music by the Beatles.

Wynn departed the Mirage in 2000, when his company was bought by MGM Grand. Vici Properties acquired the property in 2022 and continues to own it, while Hard Rock International took over operations later that year, becoming the first tribal gaming operator on the Strip. Hard Rock intends to rebrand the resort as Hard Rock Las Vegas. The property will receive a complete renovation and expansion which will include a new guitar-shaped hotel tower, taking the place of the volcano attraction. The Mirage closed on July 17, 2024, and is expected to reopen under its new name in late 2027.

== History ==
=== Background ===
A portion of the Mirage property was once occupied by a nightclub known as the Red Rooster. It opened in 1930, on what would become the Las Vegas Strip. The following year, it became the first Strip business to receive a gaming license. It was later purchased by actress Grace Hayes in 1947, and became the Grace Hayes Lodge. It was demolished in 1959, although Hayes continued living in a house located on the property. Another portion of the land was occupied by a hotel-casino known as the Castaways.

Casino owner Steve Wynn had considered building a resort on the Strip to be known as Victoria Bay, but the project was canceled in 1981, due to high costs. Three years later, he thought about building a resort in downtown Las Vegas, on 50 acres of railroad land that would later become the site of the Clark County Government Center. Wynn's plan to build in downtown were scrapped after the railroad declined his $50 million offer for the land, asking twice that amount.

Wynn, through his company Golden Nugget, Inc., eventually purchased the Castaways and nearby acreage in October 1986. Wynn's purchase included Hayes' house, which was vacated and demolished along with the Castaways to make way for a new casino resort. Wynn sold his Golden Nugget Atlantic City resort, and used the profits to fund his new project.

=== Name ===
Numerous names were considered for Wynn's project, including Bombay and Bombay Club, which had been rejected by the end of 1986. "Wynn" was considered as a name, and would later be used for the Wynn Las Vegas resort.

Wynn unveiled plans for the tropical-themed resort, temporarily known then as the Golden Nugget, in June 1987. He said the project would be renamed at a later point to match its South Seas theme. The project's working title came from Wynn's Golden Nugget hotel-casino in downtown Las Vegas. Wynn did not intend to have two Golden Nuggets in Las Vegas, believing they would become known as "the old one" and "the new one", the former of which he found undesirable for the downtown property.

The final name was announced in December 1988: The Mirage. The name emphasized the resort as an oasis in the Nevada desert. To avoid confusion, Wynn purchased the rights to the Mirage name from two local businesses, the La Mirage Casino and the Mirage Motel. Both received $250,000 to change their names.

=== 1987–1989: Development and opening ===
Construction began in November 1987. General contractors included MarCor Development Company and Sierra Construction Corporation, the latter of which worked on the hotel tower. The project had an early cost of $550 million, although it went over budget. With an ultimate cost of $630 million, the Mirage was the world's most expensive hotel-casino ever built, until the opening of Trump Taj Mahal a few months later in Atlantic City. Much of the Mirage project was financed by Drexel Burnham Lambert. Financier Michael Milken, an executive of the company, helped fund the project by selling $525 million worth of mortgage bonds. The Mirage was the first Las Vegas resort to be built with the money of Wall Street through the use of junk bonds. This financing method would later be adopted by other casino developers throughout the U.S.

Bobby Baldwin oversaw major aspects of the project with Wynn, and would later serve as the Mirage's president, after previously serving in the same position at the Las Vegas Golden Nugget. To prepare for the opening, Baldwin and others spent nearly a year visiting 250 companies – in fields such as hospitality and dining – to gather information and advice. Dissatisfied with the current public relations firm, Wynn hired Hill & Knowlton eight weeks before the opening. Despite the company's objections, Wynn refused to allow media tours and the release of early images, wanting to keep the resort a surprise for the opening. The Mirage hired nearly 6,400 employees. Wynn emphasized customer service to the workers, who underwent a month of job training before the opening.

The Mirage opened at 12:00 p.m. on November 22, 1989. Wynn previously scheduled a December 26 opening, but changed these plans after securing the Sugar Ray Leonard vs. Roberto Durán III boxing match at the resort for December 7. He intended for the Mirage to become a popular venue for boxing matches, competing with other Las Vegas resorts. Within hours of the opening, a casino customer hit a $4.6 million jackpot on a $1 slot machine.

The resort had non-traditional features for a Las Vegas gaming property, and Wynn considered them to be the primary attractions, saying the Mirage would not be dependent on its casino like other properties. Its signature attraction was an erupting artificial volcano, providing free entertainment to pedestrians in front of the resort. Other attractions included a dolphin habitat and a lush jungle display located beneath a domed atrium. In addition, the resort featured a magic show by Siegfried & Roy, and the duo's white tigers were on display in the resort while not performing. Financial analysts and gaming executives were skeptical of the Mirage, which needed to make an unprecedented $1 million per day to cover its expenses. The property would end up exceeding expectations, and gaming would become less of a focus for future Strip resorts.

The Mirage was the first new resort to be built on the Strip in 16 years, after the completion of the MGM Grand (now Horseshoe) in 1973. The Mirage was also the first megaresort to open on the Strip, and was the second in the Las Vegas Valley after the opening of the International Hotel in 1969. The Mirage's success prompted a building boom for other large Strip resorts during the 1990s. Prior to the Mirage's opening, the city was experiencing a decline in tourism, especially following New Jersey's legalization of gambling in Atlantic City. Las Vegas tourism increased 16 percent in 1990, which remains one of the largest year-over-year increases in the city's history as of 2024.

=== 1990–2000: Early years ===
Due to the Mirage's success, Wynn borrowed an additional $100 million in 1990, to add more features. These included a parking garage, more high-roller villas, and an expansion of the pool area. Wynn also partnered with singer Michael Jackson to design a mountain and water attraction at the Mirage. It would resemble Diamond Head, Hawaii, and would include pools, a water slide, and high-roller villas. It would cost up to $15 million, and would be built behind the resort. It was scheduled to open later in 1990, but ultimately went unbuilt.

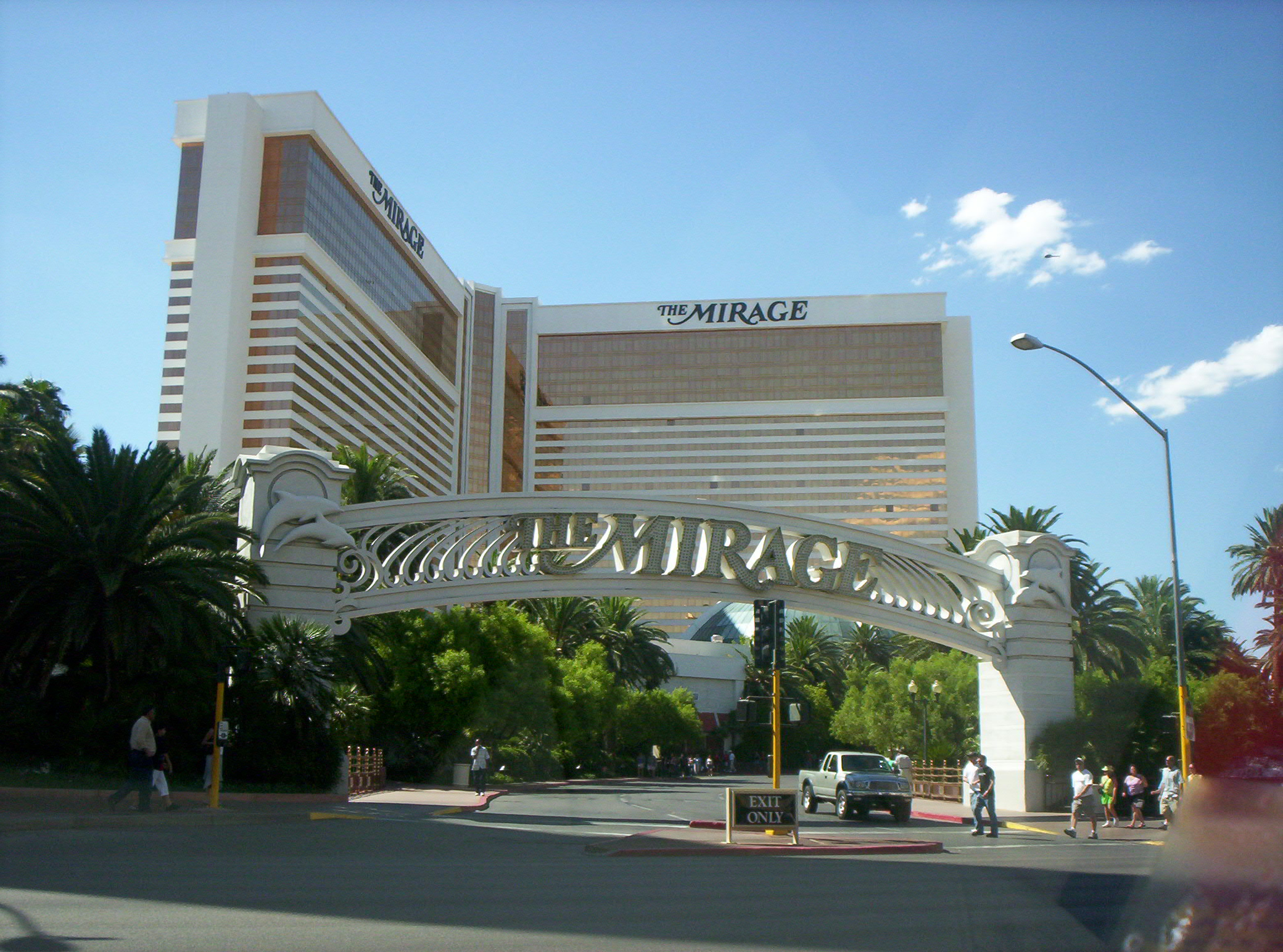
The Mirage and its south entry in 2005

Wynn owned the resort through his company, Golden Nugget Inc., which he renamed Mirage Resorts in 1991. A $55 million renovation took place in 1995. As of 1997, it was the most profitable resort on the Strip.

=== 2000–2016: Operator changes ===
Wynn left the property and Mirage Resorts in 2000, when the company was acquired by billionaire Kirk Kerkorian, owner of MGM Grand Inc., later renamed to MGM Mirage. The hotel rooms were renovated in 2002, and a major renovation took place from 2005 to 2006, to help the Mirage compete with newer resorts. The project included several new restaurants and a nightclub, among other changes. It was the largest renovation since the resort's opening.

A $100 million renovation took place in 2008, updating the casino floor and hotel rooms, while adding several restaurants. In 2009, Phil Ruffin bought the adjacent Treasure Island Hotel and Casino from MGM Mirage. He subsequently made offers to buy the 65-acre Mirage, but was rejected. MGM Mirage was renamed MGM Resorts International in 2010. Twenty years after its opening, the Mirage remained popular despite being overshadowed by newer and more-luxurious resorts.

=== 2016–2024: Final years ===
Ownership of the Mirage, along with many other MGM properties, was transferred in 2016 to MGM Growth Properties, while MGM Resorts continued to operate it under a lease agreement. Vici Properties acquired MGM Growth, including the Mirage, in 2022.

==== Redevelopment as Hard Rock ====
In November 2021, while Vici was in the process of buying the Mirage, MGM Resorts announced that it was in the early stages of selling the resort's casino operations. The company already operated nine other resorts, and was preparing to add a tenth to its portfolio. CEO William Hornbuckle, who helped oversee the Mirage's opening, said the resort "just fell pretty far down in the spectrum of how much in capital we'd allocate to it in any given period of time in the near future. And so we just took a strategic decision to sell it".

In December 2021, Hard Rock International agreed to purchase the Mirage's operations from MGM Resorts for $1.075 billion. Hard Rock would lease the property from Vici and rebrand the Mirage as Hard Rock Las Vegas. MGM would keep the "Mirage" name and license it to Hard Rock for up to three years, until the rebranding went into effect. The Mirage will receive a full renovation as part of the rebranding, and Hard Rock also intends to construct a guitar-shaped hotel tower, replacing the Mirage's volcano. This prompted a Change.org petition to save the attraction from demolition, although the effort was ultimately unsuccessful.

Hard Rock's deal to operate the Mirage was finalized on December 19, 2022, making it the first tribal gaming operator on the Strip. Under the new management, additional slot machines and table games were soon added in an effort to increase gaming revenue. Stages were also added to two bars for nightly entertainment, consistent with Hard Rock's music theme.

The Mirage was expected to continue operating throughout the Hard Rock transition. However, in May 2024, Hard Rock announced that the Mirage would permanently close two months later. Hard Rock Las Vegas is expected to open in late 2027.

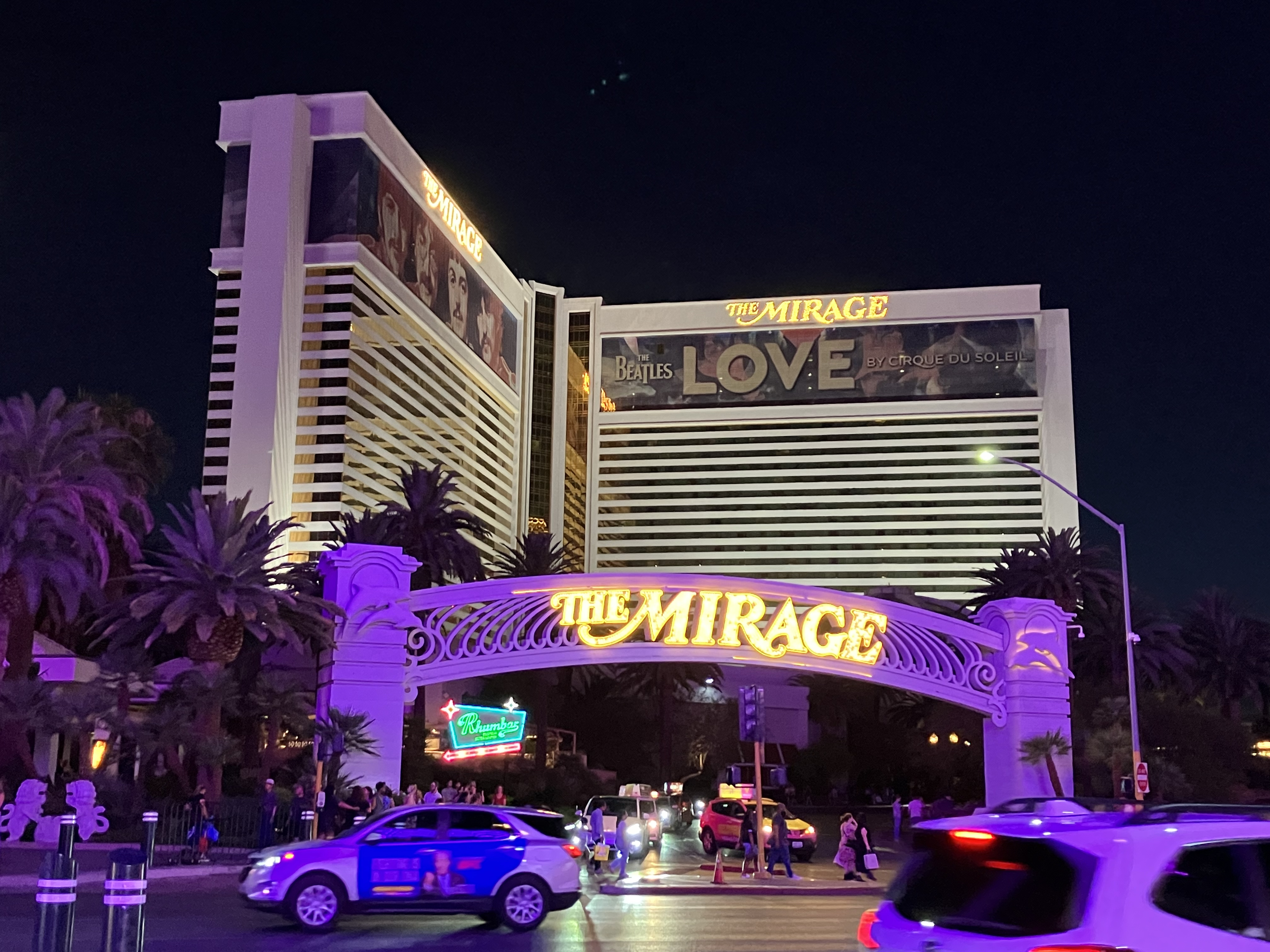
The Mirage's south entry on June 14, 2024, one month before the resort's closure. The arch sign was later donated to the Neon Museum for preservation.

The Mirage's hotel closed on July 15, 2024. Gaming operations ended on the early morning of July 17, and the entire property was closed later that day, shortly after 11:00 a.m. The Mirage attracted many last-time visitors in the days leading up to its closure. Hard Rock International expected to provide $80 million in severance pay to the property's 3,000 laid-off workers. At its closure, the Mirage included 137 employees who had been with the property since it opened.

Closing ceremonies included speeches by former Las Vegas mayor Jan Jones Blackhurst and by Steve Wynn's wife, Elaine Wynn, who toured the property hours before the closure. She had not visited the property in years and said, "It's a very poignant moment for me, and I didn't realize the impact of it until I walked into the building. But this is what we do in Las Vegas. We reinvest, we refresh, and we keep Las Vegas as one of the most exciting cities in the entire world." The ceremony concluded with a final eruption of the volcano. Steve Wynn did not attend the event, but wrote a lengthy tribute to the property, acknowledging its legacy. Bo Bernhard, director of the International Gaming Institute at the University of Nevada, Las Vegas (UNLV), noted that the Mirage "changed the image Las Vegas projected to the rest of the world" and set a standard for future resorts. Michael Green, a UNLV history professor, said, "Las Vegas always reinvents itself. The Mirage is no longer state-of-the-art."

Nevada gaming regulations required that the Mirage award its $1.6 million accumulated progressive jackpot before its closure, with the casino paying out about 75% as slot machine jackpots and the other 25% via table games. From July 9–11, the casino gave away $200,000 in slot machine jackpots, followed by $250,000 over the next two days. On July 16, it gave away $100,000; the remaining $400,000 was given away at the table games.

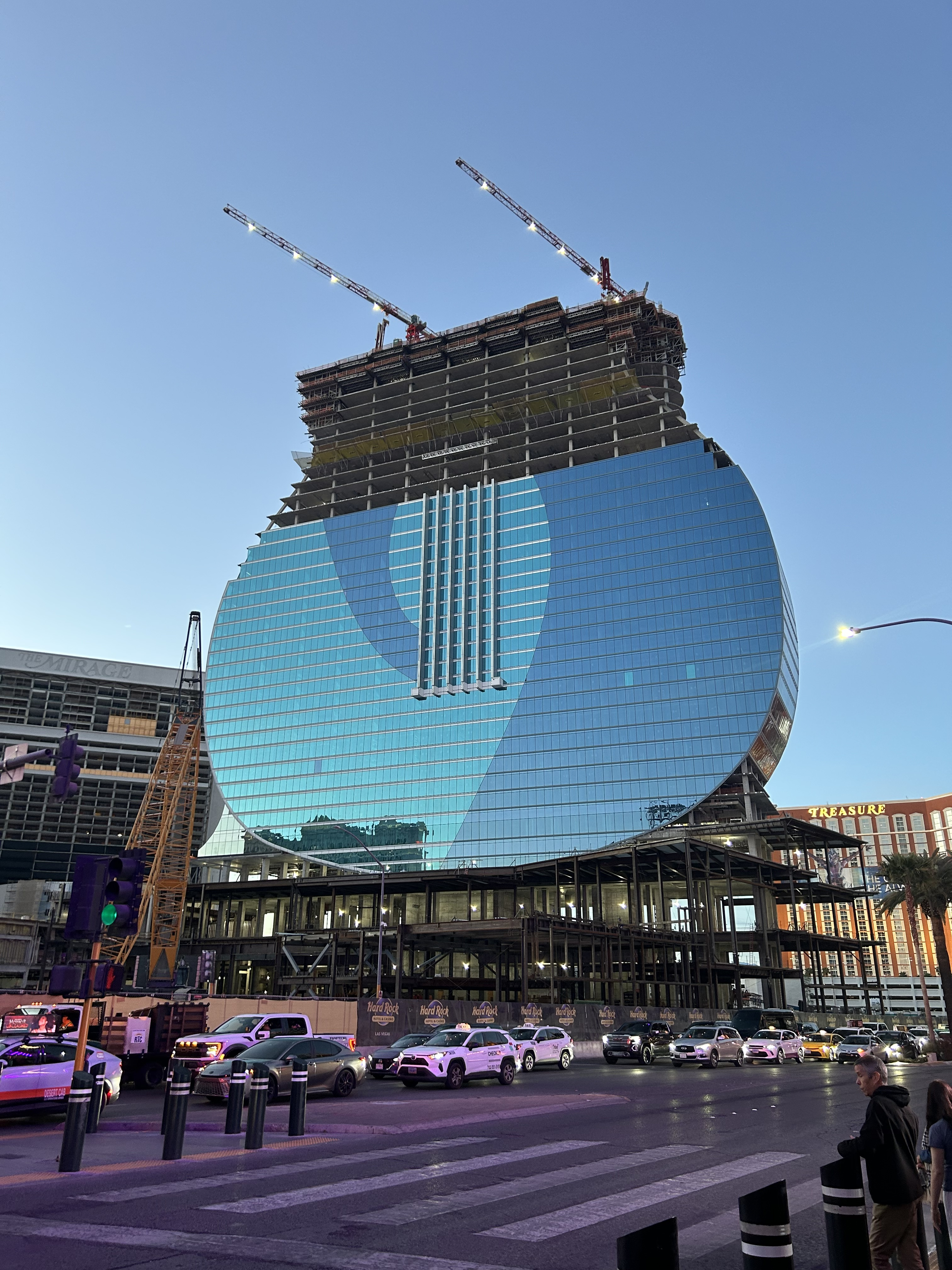
Hard Rock Las Vegas under construction (March 2026)

Work on the Hard Rock project began one day after the closure. Demolition of the volcano was among the first tasks. Signage from the Mirage was donated to the city's Neon Museum for preservation, including a 30-foot-long arch along the Strip that marked the resort's south entry. Various items from inside the hotel are set to be sold at auction.

== Legal cases ==
In 1992, guest Joseph Canterino said he was beaten and robbed by two men on the hotel's 16th floor. The men, who were never found, took more than $70,000 according to Canterino, who said the incident made him nervous to leave home. He sued the Mirage, alleging inadequate security. After a decade of litigation, the Nevada Supreme Court ruled in the resort's favor.

In 1997, Mirage executive Laura Choi traveled to South Korea to collect gambling debts for the resort. However, she was arrested for violating the country's law on debt collection, which prohibited citizens from allowing money to go overseas if the amount exceeded $10,000. According to the Mirage, the money was supposed to be collected in other countries through a number of legal avenues. An investigation into Choi and the Mirage was launched by multiple agencies. Choi said Mirage Resorts was aware of her actions and encouraged them, while the company called Choi a rogue employee and declined to provide legal assistance. After 79 days in prison, she returned to the U.S. and was fired. State gaming regulators alleged that Choi's actions were supported by Mirage Resorts, which eventually paid a $350,000 fine. The company later alleged that Choi embezzled money, and that she conspired with Wynn's casino rival, Donald Trump, to obtain guest lists and divert customers from the Mirage to Trump's properties instead. Choi, meanwhile, filed wrongful termination lawsuits against the company. The two settled in 2001.

In 1997, the Mirage was sued by 11 cocktail waitresses alleging weight discrimination from Wynn and the resort. The suit referenced a 1995 meeting that some of the women had with Wynn, who allegedly told them, "You're too fat, and I'm embarrassed to have you working here". The incident would later become known as the "Fat Meeting", and the women became the subject of weight-related jokes among co-workers. Two women agreed to $5,000 settlements in 1998, and another withdrew from the case. It ended in May 2003, after the remaining women agreed to settlements with MGM Mirage.

In 2003, several resort employees were fired after failure to file months' worth of currency transaction reports. One former employee in particular would become the primary focus of a state investigation, which found that he had lied to his supervisors about mailing the reports, concealing the fact that he was actually months behind on the work. Nearly 15,000 reports had gone unfiled, and the Nevada Gaming Commission issued a record $5 million fine against MGM Mirage. CEO Terry Lanni considered it the most embarrassing incident in the gaming industry during his 26-year career. Two other ex-employees sued the company, alleging wrongful termination in the case.

== Design and plant life ==
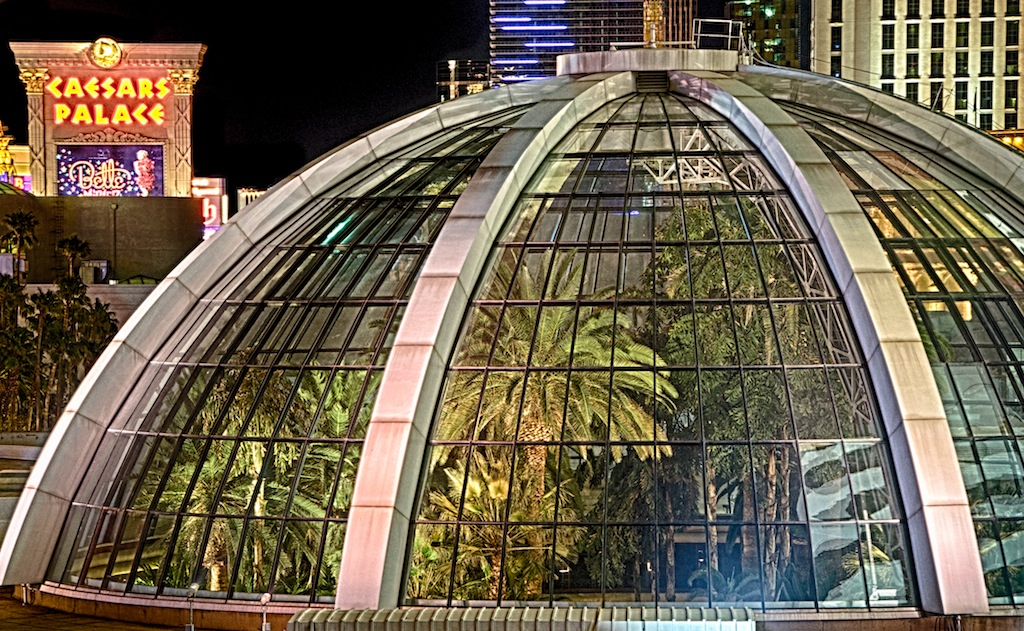
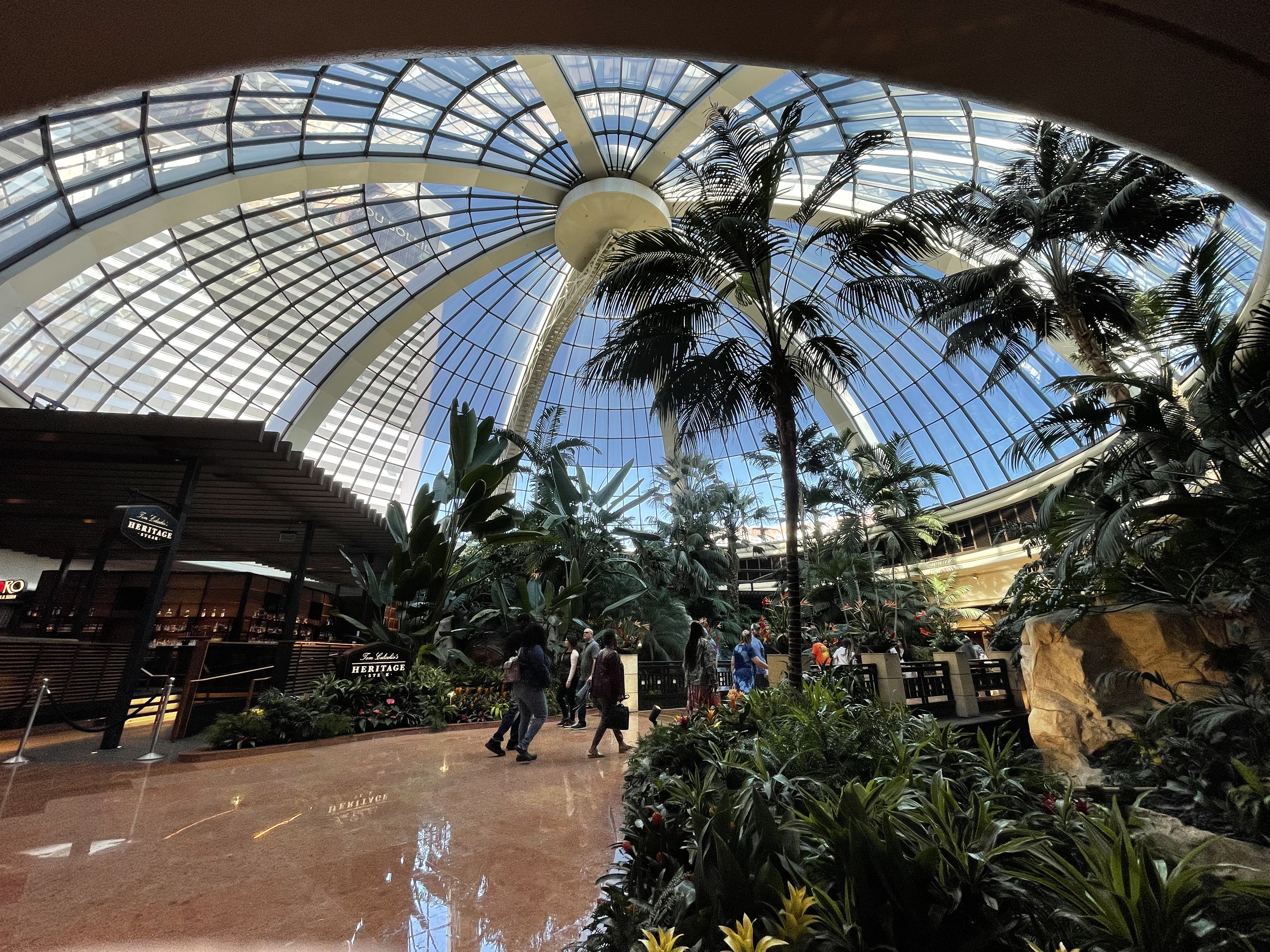
Exterior and interior of the dome

The Mirage was designed by Joel Bergman, who led Wynn's design firm Atlandia. The firm also included interior designers Henry Conversano and Roger Thomas, and architect DeRuyter Butler. Don Brinkerhoff and his landscape company, Lifescapes International, also worked on the resort. In addition to his team, Wynn also took design suggestions from his wife Elaine. The team was heavily involved in every design aspect of the project, which underwent numerous revisions, particularly in relation to its hotel tower. Wynn's team did extensive studies of several local resorts – Bally's, the Las Vegas Hilton, the Flamingo, and the adjacent Caesars Palace – and sought to combine their best features into one property.

Unlike other casinos at the time, the Mirage's pedestrian entrances were built back away from the Las Vegas Strip, with the volcano serving as an attraction to pique the interest of pedestrians and lure them inside. This was done at the suggestion of Elaine Wynn: "Steve wanted to build the Mirage right off the sidewalk, and I said that we had to push it back, that people wouldn't get the benefit of the architectural design if they didn't have a frame of reference". Wynn had the property layout designed for convenience to guests, allowing them to quickly access amenities.

The Mirage has a South Seas/Polynesian theme. Wynn said, "There had been a terrible sameness to the properties of Las Vegas. The public couldn't differentiate between the Sands, the Dunes, the Aladdin, the Sahara. I wanted to take it to a new level". Describing his vision, Wynn said, "Think of the harsh Southern Nevada desert, and then you see a waterfall, something out of the South Pacific or the island of Kauai. It's not supposed to be there, and that was the intention". He was partly inspired by the 1958 film South Pacific. The volcano and waterfall features were added as a contrast to the city's usual neon lights. Wynn said, "I'm burned out on neon. I think it's cheap. To me, neon is yesterday Las Vegas".

Upon its opening, the exterior included 10 acres of landscaped lawns and pools, featuring 1,000 palm trees and 40,000 scrubs. Other plant life included pine trees and ferns. The Mirage had a staff of 60 gardeners to oversee the various plant life around the property. The resort includes a nine-story domed atrium which covers an indoor tropical rainforest display. It has a combination of fake and real plant life, including orchids and 70-foot palm trees. A 40-foot Washington palm was injected with formaldehyde to preserve it, and a steel rod was inserted up its trunk to angle it over a stream in the atrium. Brinkerhoff handled the design and landscaping for the atrium, which was inspired by a project that Wynn planned in Atlantic City, before cancelling it in 1985.

By 2019, the resort's tropical theme had been scaled back. Five years later, the atrium would be demolished as part of the Hard Rock transition.

== Features ==
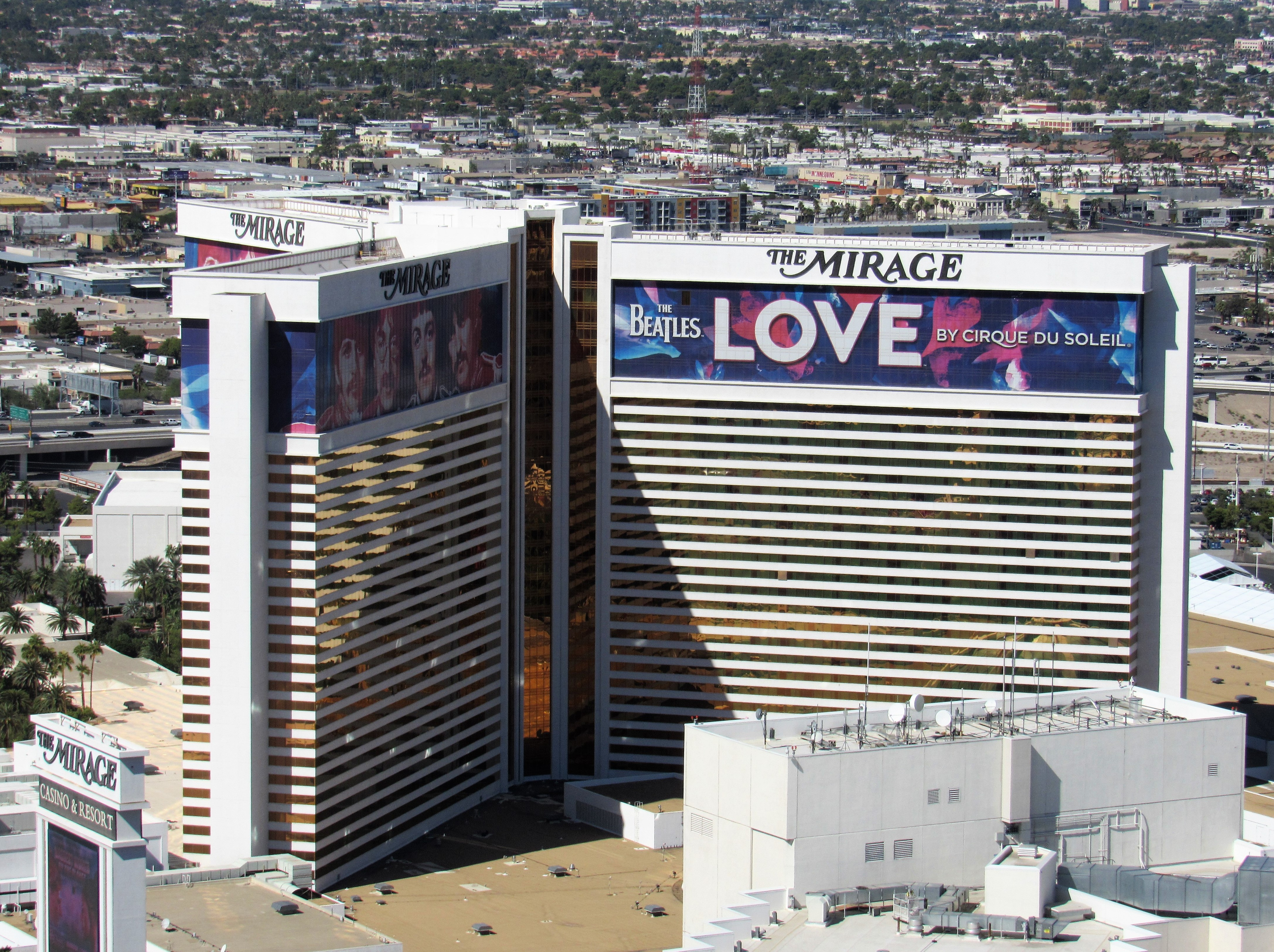
Mirage hotel tower in 2019

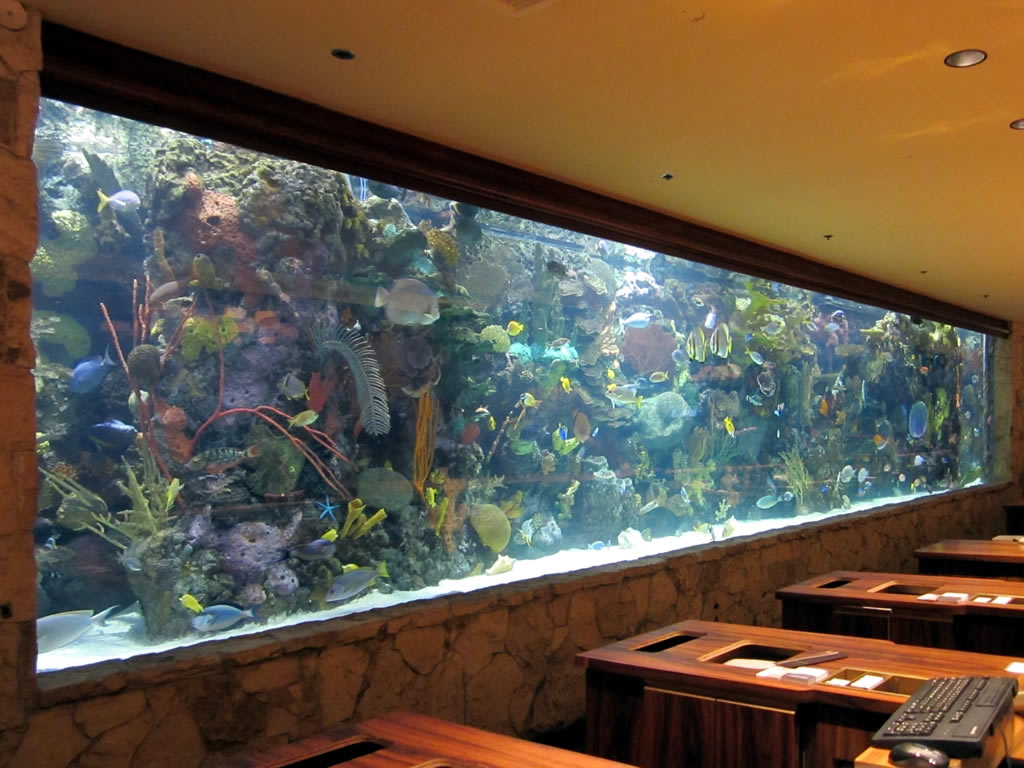
Lobby aquarium

With 3,049 rooms, the Mirage was among the world's largest hotels when it opened, surpassed by the Las Vegas Hilton (3,174) and the Rossiya Hotel in Moscow (3,200). The hotel tower, standing 29 stories, was built out in a Y-shape layout, copying the design used at the Las Vegas Hilton. The Mirage popularized the Y-shape design, which was later copied by Las Vegas' Treasure Island, Monte Carlo, and Mandalay Bay resorts. The hotel's top five floors are used for high roller rooms and penthouse suites. The exterior windows are made of 18-karat gold, and the suite floors are distinguished with uninterrupted glass panes, whereas the lower floors have white streaks between them. The white-and-gold color scheme had previously been used at the Golden Nugget.

Since its opening, the hotel has featured a $1.2 million aquarium tank, built behind the check-in stand. The aquarium was conceived by Conversano to distract guests and relax them while waiting to check in. It contains hundreds of fish, and is a popular attraction.

The Mirage's casino measures 90,548 sq ft (8,412.2 m^{2}). It opened with 2,300 slot machines and 115 table games. A high-limit area was added at the last minute, having been overlooked prior to that point. The Mirage was the first Las Vegas casino to use security cameras full-time on all table games. In 1997, Mirage Resorts spent $150 million on artwork which was displayed in the resort's high-stakes gaming area. The casino added a new high-limit gaming area in 2004, featuring design work by artist Dale Chihuly.

The Mirage also has 300,000 sq ft (28,000 m^{2}) of convention space. Other resort features have included a tattoo parlor, and a clothing store by the Kardashian family. The Mirage-Treasure Island Tram traveled between the two resorts.

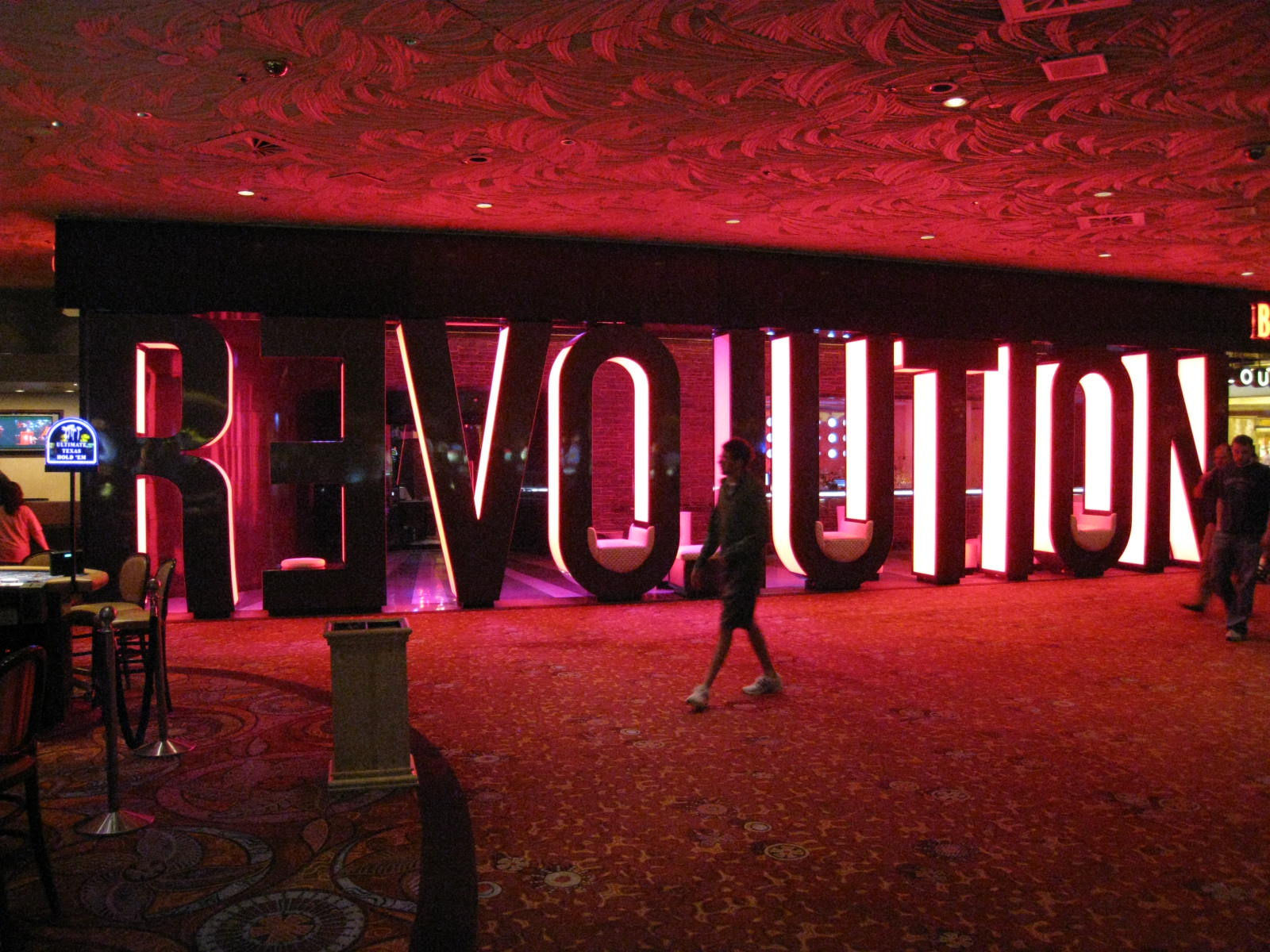
Revolution entrance

The Jet nightclub was added in 2005, operated by The Light Group. The 16,500 sq ft (1,530 m^{2}) club was divided across three rooms. It featured projection imagery and 120 LED ceiling tiles. The club operated until 2011, when it was renamed 1 OAK, standing for "one of a kind". The club featured artwork by Roy Nachum. It closed in early 2020.

Revolution, an $11 million nightclub themed after the Beatles, was added in 2006, to accompany the resort's opening of the Beatles-themed show Love by Cirque du Soleil. It was a joint venture between Apple Corps and Cirque du Soleil, marking the latter's first Las Vegas nightclub. The 7,000 sq ft (650 m^{2}) club fit up to 400 people. The entrance was marked by 10-foot-tall capitalized letters spelling out the club's name, with "EVOL" spelled backwards to form the word "LOVE". The club closed in 2015.

The resort includes a topless pool area known as Bare Pool Lounge, opened in 2007. It is also operated by The Light Group. It features DJ music, and is popular among local residents, as well as celebrities.

=== Volcano ===
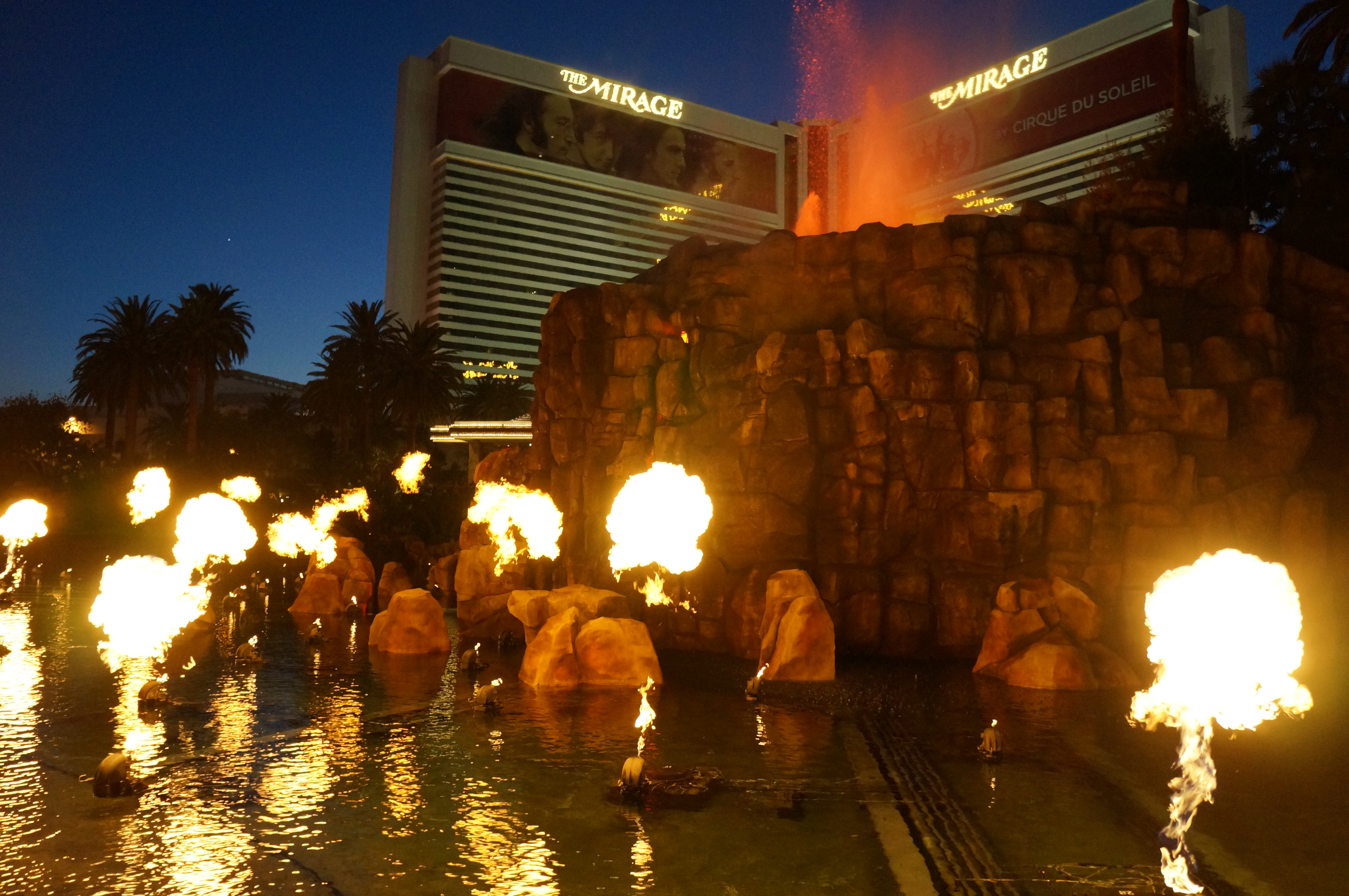
Volcano attraction

The Mirage opened with an artificial volcano attraction, located in front of the resort. It became a signature attraction for Las Vegas. The volcano, free to the public and visible to pedestrians, erupts regularly each night. Gas jets provide the flames for the volcano, which has water flowing down its sides into a lagoon, covering 4.5 acres (1.8 ha). Natural gas pipes, 8 inches (200 mm) in width, are used in conjunction with a recirculating system to give the appearance that the lagoon is on fire. In addition, whitewater from the volcano is covered in red lighting to simulate lava.

Originally, the lagoon area was to include a dormant volcano. Lighting designer David Hersey, who was hired to light the resort, suggested making the volcano erupt. Wynn had been satisfied with the lagoon feature as-is, and he was concerned that an erupting volcano would look underwhelming. However, he approved the idea after seeing a scale model. Hersey designed the attraction with Brinkerhoff. They added a texture to the rock formations to produce micro bubbles in the water, fulfilling Wynn's desire to have whitewater in the attraction, as it allowed for adequate lighting. Wynn disliked the sulfuric odor given off by the volcanic eruptions, so a piña colada scent was added.

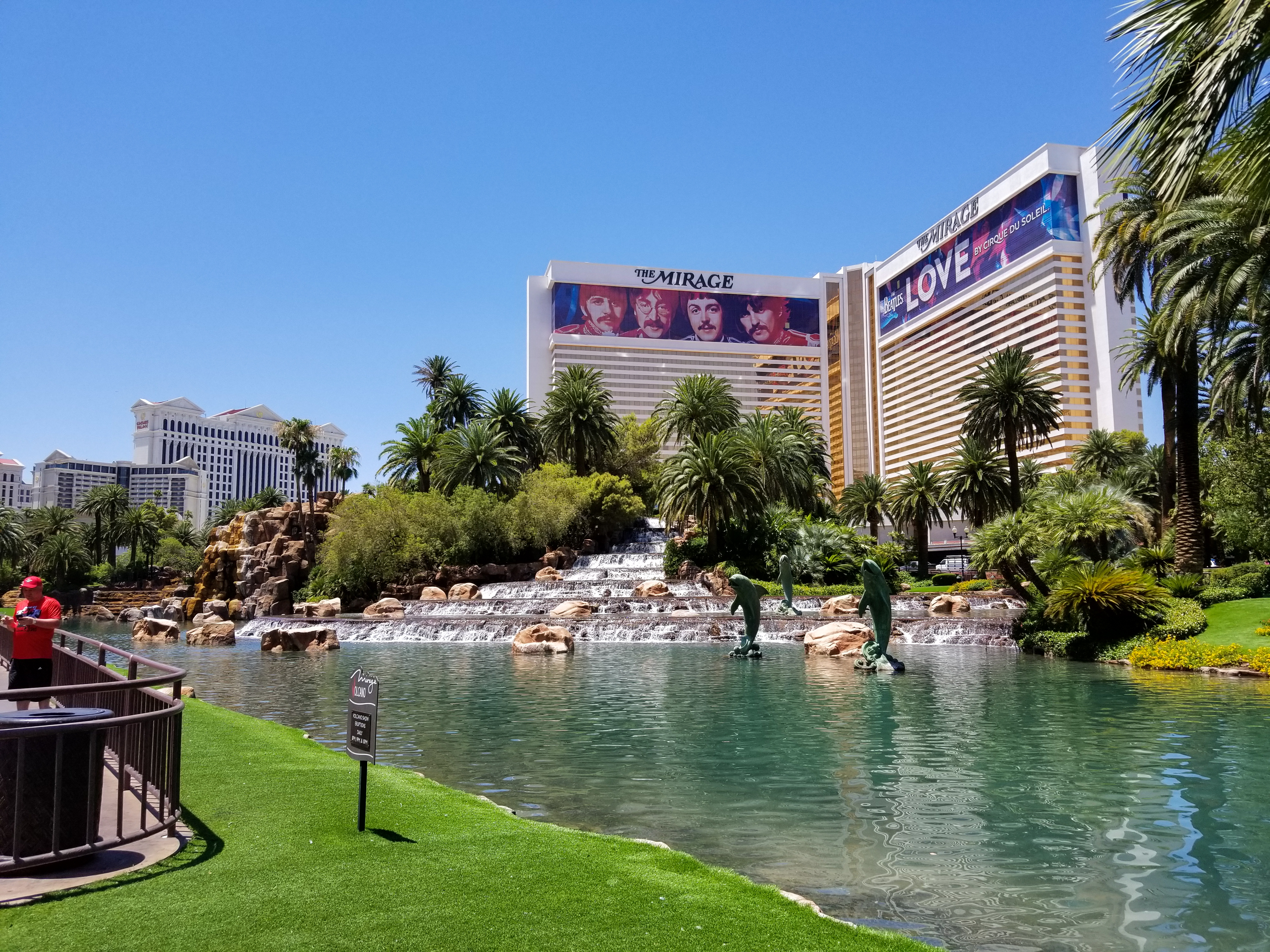
Lagoon area

In 2005, the design firm WET was hired to begin planning an upgrade of the volcano. The company spent two years developing a fire-shooting device for the revamped volcano. It closed in February 2008, to allow for the $25 million upgrade to take place. The volcanic structure, made of steel, was stripped down to receive a new exterior. It reopened at the end of the year. The improved volcano shoots water 12 feet (3.7 m) high, while 120 flamethrower devices spout out flames on the lagoon. The attraction is choreographed to music by Mickey Hart and Zakir Hussain. WET's redesign was inspired by the Fountains of Bellagio, another choreographed attraction by the company.

In 2015, MGM reduced the number of daily volcanic eruptions as a potential cost-saving measure. Super Bowl LVIII was held in Las Vegas in 2024, and was broadcast by CBS, owned by Paramount Global. To promote the game and Paramount media franchises, the Mirage's volcano and lagoon area were temporarily transformed into an interactive Alpine-themed mountain attraction depicting the Paramount Pictures mountain logo.

=== Animal habitats ===
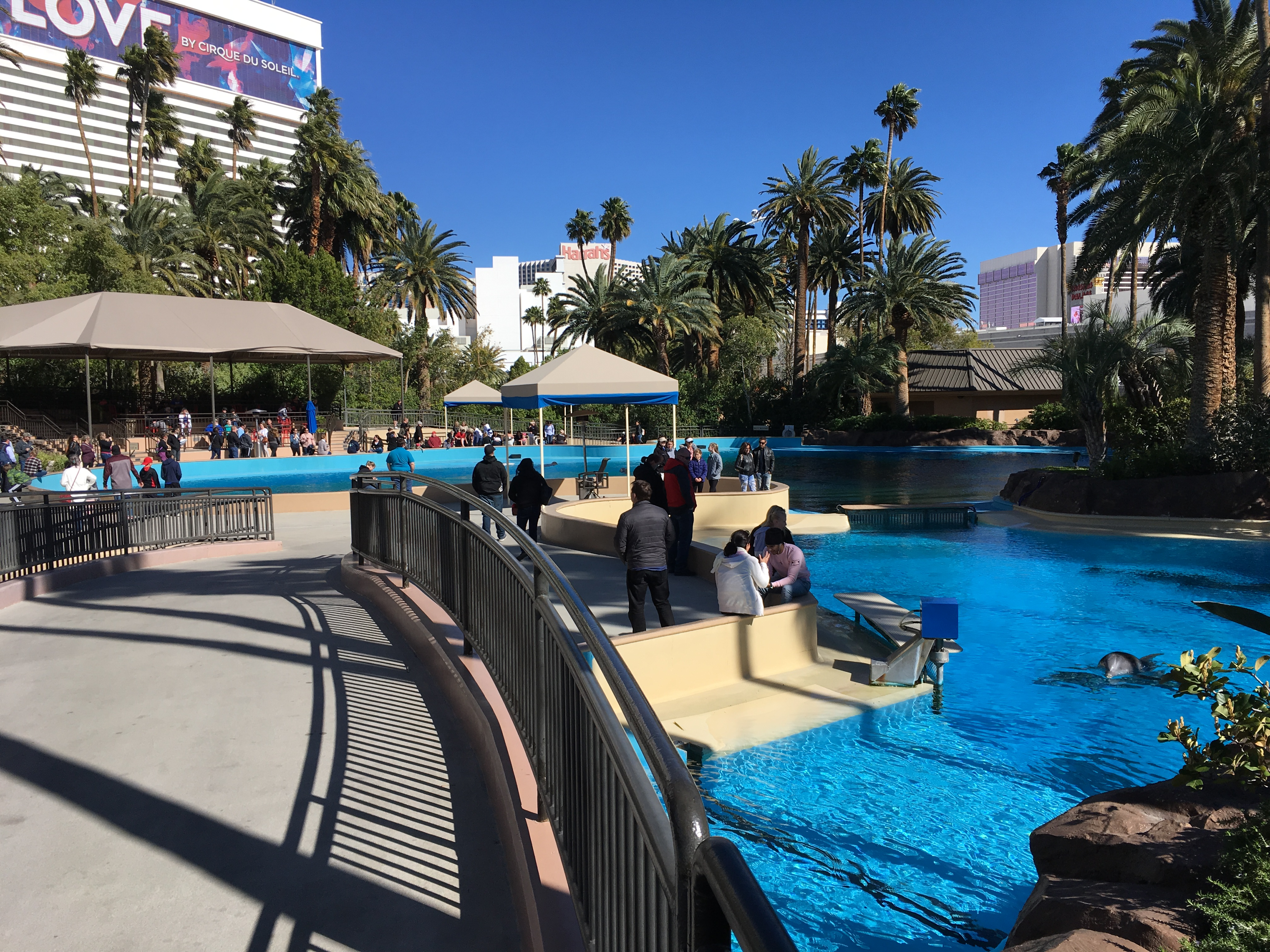
Dolphin habitat, 2019

A $14 million dolphin habitat opened at the Mirage on October 19, 1990, purporting to serve as an educational and research center while also offering the public scheduled entertainment featuring dolphins and trainers. The facility consisted of four pools providing a total of 2.5 million gallons, exceeding government minimums. The attraction included tours, and for an additional fee, visitors could interact with the dolphins and become trainers for a day. School groups frequently visited the site as local schools took it to be entertaining and educational. It originally featured five bottlenose dolphins, including four from Marathon, Florida and one from Texas. As of 2008, three dolphin generations had been born at the attraction, and a fourth began in 2019. The attraction did not feature wild dolphins.

On November 13, 1996, the Mirage opened the Secret Garden of Siegfried & Roy, an outdoor attraction showcasing six types of animals which were featured in the magicians' show at the resort. These included Bengal tigers, white tigers, white lions, a snow leopard, a panther, and an Asian elephant. Siegfried & Roy also ran a breeding program for big cats, particularly white lions and tigers, which resided at the Secret Garden. The $15 million attraction, covering 2.5 acres (1.0 ha), was built next to the property's dolphin habitat. By 2002, the dolphin area had become part of Siegfried & Roy's attraction, now known as Siegfried & Roy's Secret Garden and Dolphin Habitat. The attraction covered 10 acres, and received 500,000 annual visitors as of 2017.

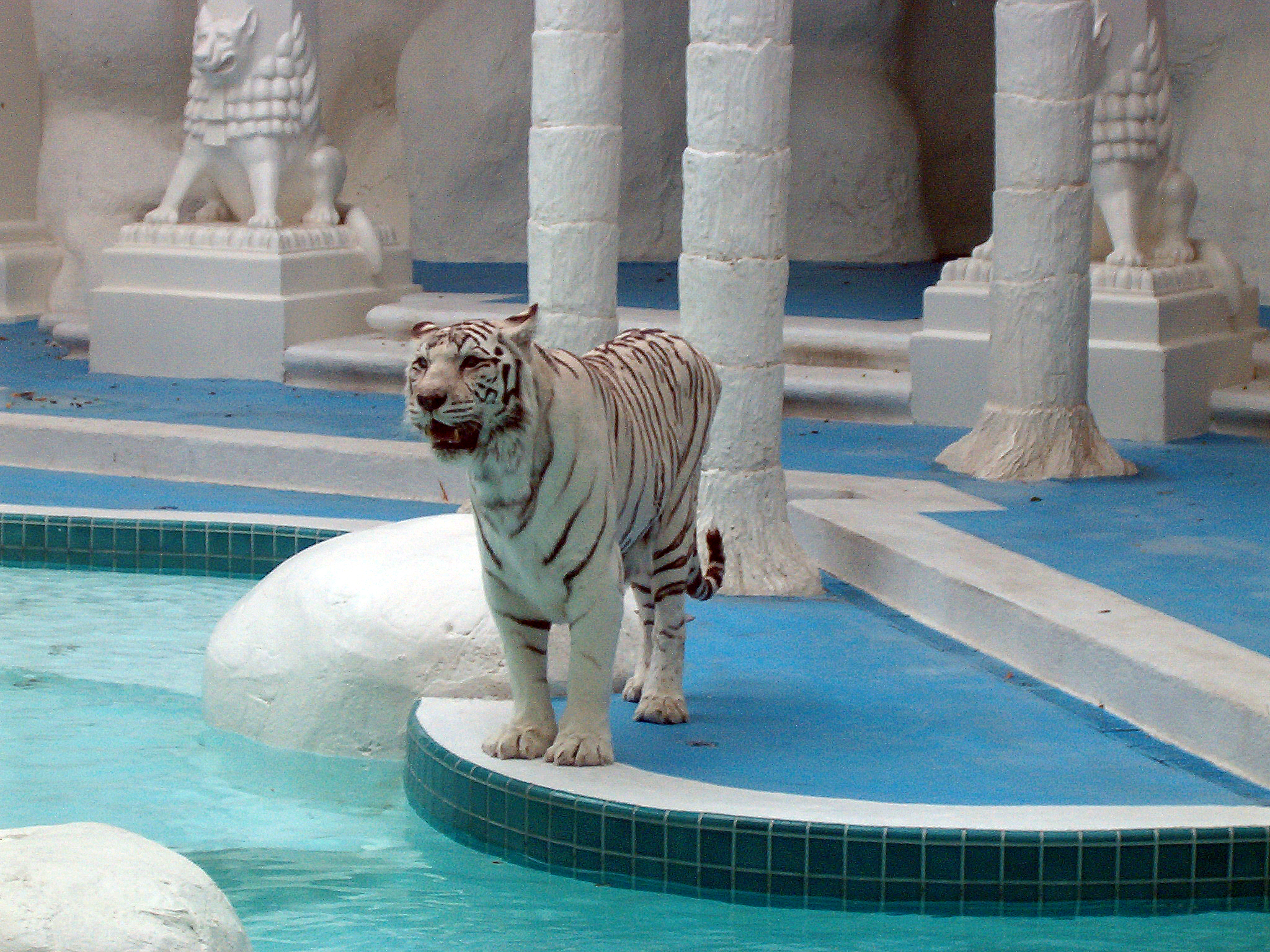
White tiger habitat, 2006

In addition, the white tigers from Siegfried & Roy's magic show were on display for free while not performing. A first-floor hallway near the resort's southern entrance featured a glass wall, allowing guests to watch the tigers in an enclosure. The tiger habitat was designed in all-white by Brinkerhoff, and was built for approximately $5 million. It opened with the resort in 1989, and was closed in November 2007, replaced by the BLT Burger restaurant. The tigers were moved to Siegfried & Roy's Secret Garden to encourage more visitors there.

Several animal-rights groups criticized the habitats. In 2009, Born Free USA and the World Society for the Protection of Animals accused the Mirage of using its dolphin habitat for entertainment and profit rather than education. Fourteen dolphins had died at the habitat since its opening, five of them stillbirths or young deaths. Others died from respiratory problems. Later in 2009, the Mirage imported two new dolphins, despite criticism from the groups. After extensive inspections, pro-industry animal welfare group American Humane certified the Secret Garden and Dolphin Habitat in 2017, stating that it represented "the gold standard for animal welfare". It was one of 14 animal attractions worldwide to receive their endorsement, and the first in the western U.S.

MGM closed the Secret Garden and Dolphin Habitat in September 2022, following three more dolphin deaths that year. Hard Rock International subsequently determined that the attraction would not be part of its future plans for the resort, with the animals relocated to new homes. Three of the habitat's dolphins were returned to SeaWorld San Diego, which had loaned them to the resort years earlier. Others were relocated to Coral World Ocean Park in the U.S. Virgin Islands. The big cats were moved to animal sanctuaries in Oregon and Texas.

=== Restaurants ===
The Mirage opened with five fine-dining restaurants, including the Italian-themed Ristorante Riva. It also had middle-class eateries such as the Bermuda Buffet and the 24-hour Caribe Cafe. To keep costs down, a single kitchen was built in the center of the property to service the restaurants. In 1998, the Mirage revamped its restaurants and added several new ones. Among them was Onda, an Italian restaurant by chef Todd English that replaced Ristorante Riva.

Chef Alex Stratta oversaw Renoir, a restaurant featuring paintings by the French artist Pierre-Auguste Renoir. It opened in 1999. A year later, Renoir became one of the first Las Vegas restaurants to win a Five-Star rating from the Mobil Travel Guide. It also won the AAA Five Diamond Award in 2001 and 2002. Renoir closed in November 2004, after Stratta declined to renew his contract. It was replaced by a Chinese restaurant known as Fin. A Japanese restaurant, Otoro, would also open at the property.

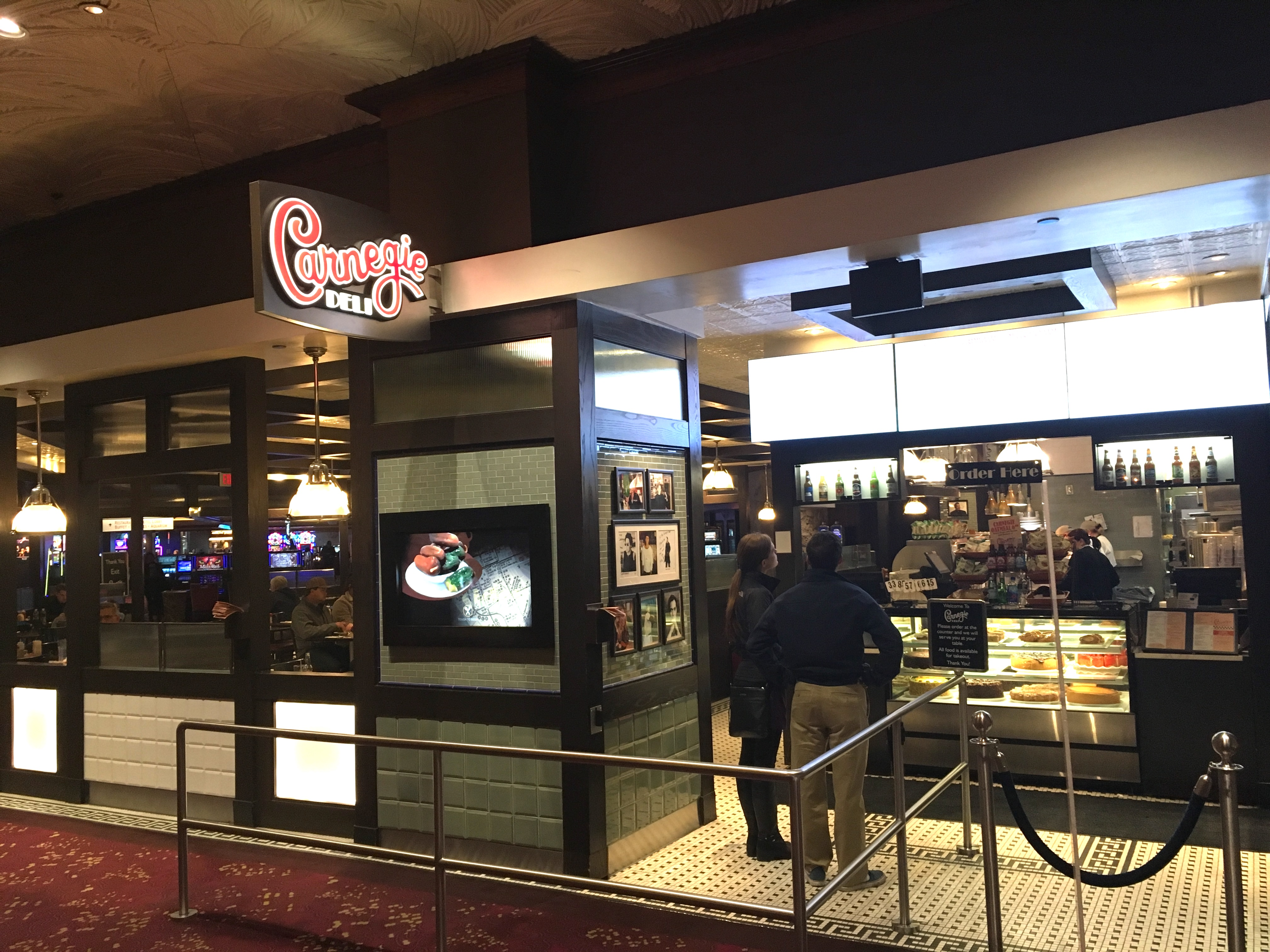
Carnegie Deli at the Mirage

Several restaurant changes were made in the mid-2000s. A new buffet, designed by Adam Tihany, was added in 2004. Carnegie Deli, a popular Manhattan establishment, opened another location at the Mirage in 2005, also with a design by Tihany. Like its predecessor, the Mirage location was also popular. It eventually closed in 2020, to make way for a new eatery.

B.B. King's Blues Club opened a location at the Mirage in November 2009, replacing the Caribe Cafe. The club operated through a lease agreement with the Mirage, although the two had a strained relationship. In particular, the club accused the resort of overcharging for cleaning services such as dishwashing. The Blues Club filed for Chapter 11 bankruptcy in 2011, and fought in court to avoid being evicted. It eventually closed in November 2012.

Chef Tom Colicchio opened a 220-seat steakhouse, Tom Colicchio's Heritage Steak, in 2013. Meanwhile, chef Michael LaPlaca took over Onda and renamed it Portofino the following year. It also served Italian food, and briefly offered a $100 lasagna topped with 23-karat gold flakes and shaved white diamond truffles. The restaurant closed in 2017, and LaPlaca opened a larger Italian restaurant, Osteria Costa, elsewhere in the resort.

BLT Burger operated for eight years before being replaced in 2016 by a resort-run restaurant, LVB Burgers & Bar. An 8,000 sq ft (740 m^{2}) sports bar – known as The Still Crafts, Drafts & Eats – was also opened in 2016.

== Live entertainment ==
The Mirage showcased boxing matches in its early years, competing against the Las Vegas Hilton and the adjacent Caesars Palace. Matches at the resort included:

- Sugar Ray Leonard vs. Roberto Durán III (1989)
- Buster Douglas vs. Evander Holyfield (1990)
- Mike Tyson vs. Donovan Ruddock (1991)
- Mike Tyson vs. Donovan Ruddock II (1991)
- Félix Trinidad vs. Freddie Pendleton (1996)

Cirque du Soleil performed its first Las Vegas show at the Mirage starting in 1992. The show, Nouvelle Expérience, was performed in a 1,300-seat big-top tent, built behind the resort. The temporary $5 million tent was air-conditioned, fire-proof, and had a cement foundation to withstand strong winds. Wynn and Cirque du Soleil would partner again for Mystère, which opened at Wynn's Treasure Island resort in 1993.

Two additional theater venues were being added in 1999, at a cost of $100 million. One theater was to be used for the show Miss Spectacular, which ultimately went unproduced. Another stage was built for impressionist Danny Gans, who began entertaining at the Mirage in 2000. A ballroom was converted into the 1,265-seat Danny Gans Theatre, at a cost of approximately $15 million. Gans' contract ended in early 2009, when he moved to Wynn's new Encore Las Vegas property. Ventriloquist Terry Fator replaced Gans and took over his former theater space, operating a popular puppet show for more than 10 years. Amid declining ticket sales, Fator closed his show in 2020 and sought a smaller venue.

Other entertainers at the Mirage have included Paul Anka, Dennis Miller, Lewis Black, George Lopez, Bill Burr, and Matt Goss. Several individuals have performed one-man shows at the resort, including Larry King (2011), Terry Bradshaw (2013), and Al Pacino (2014). Magician Shin Lim has performed at the Mirage since 2019. A comedy club, known as Aces of Comedy, debuted in 2010, and was rebranded Center Stage Comedy in 2023.

=== Siegfried & Roy ===
Siegfried & Roy onstage with their lions

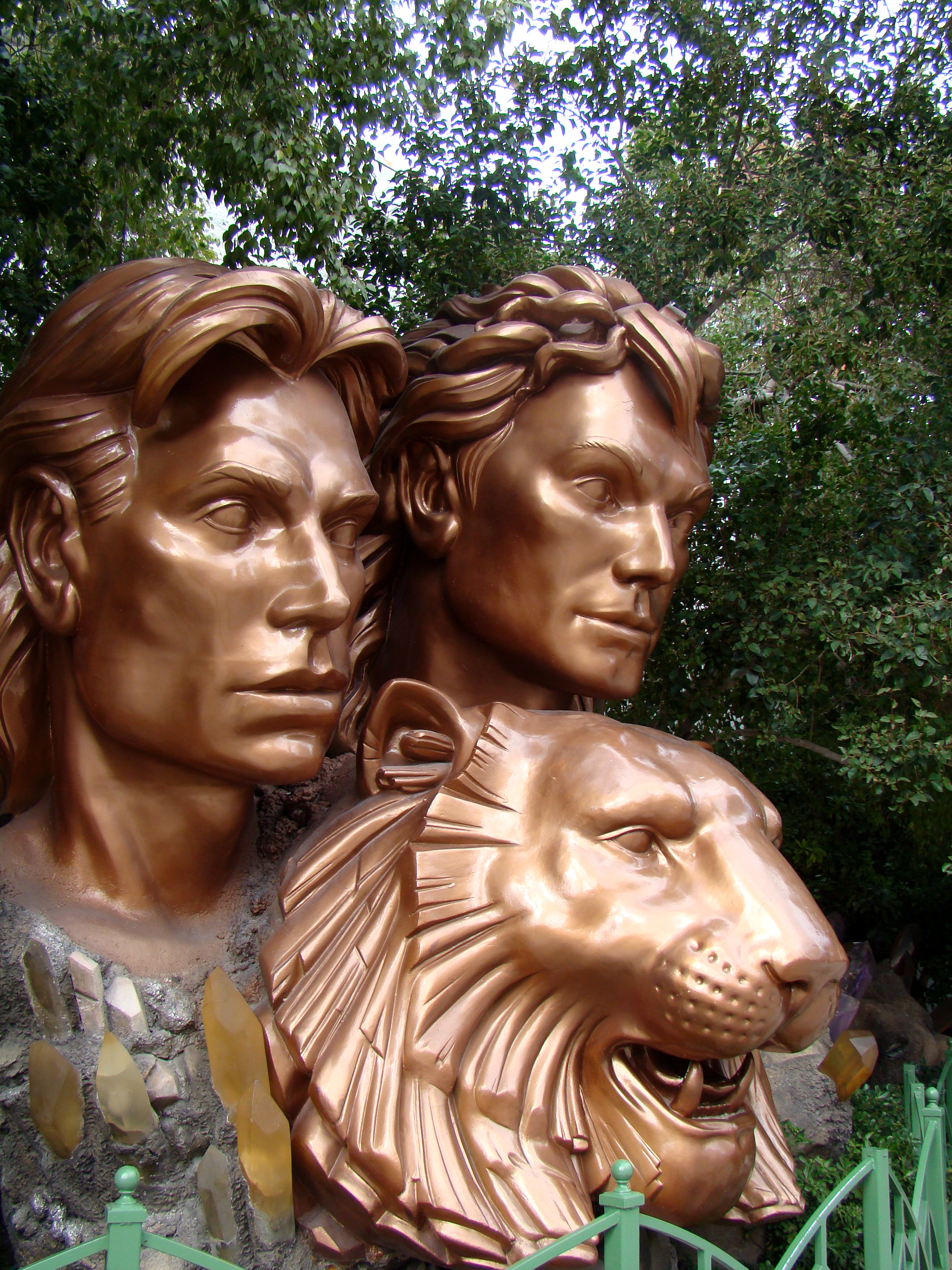
Siegfried & Roy statue at the Mirage

Illusionists Siegfried & Roy signed a $58 million contract with the Mirage, and began performing there on February 1, 1990. Their magic show included several white tigers, and it took place in a 1,500-seat theater, known as Theatre Mirage. The show was produced by Feld Entertainment. The duo would become a top attraction for Las Vegas and the Mirage, which added a statue of them on the property grounds in 1993. Two years later, because of their success, Theatre Mirage was renamed after Siegfried & Roy.

On October 3, 2003, Roy Horn was injured during a performance when one of the tigers, Mantacore, bit him by the neck and dragged him offstage. Horn reportedly suffered a stroke during surgery for his injury. Horn later said that he suffered a dizzy spell during the show, thinking it may have been the start of the stroke, and stated that Mantacore was attempting to save him: "I fell over. Mantacore saw that I was falling down. So he actually took me and brought me to the other exit where everybody could get me and help me". MGM Mirage spokesman Alan Feldman said, "If that animal intended to harm Roy, it would have lasted two seconds, and there would have been no need for a hospital".

Horn was left partially paralyzed from the stroke. Several days after the attack, the Mirage announced that the show would not resume. The duo had given 5,750 performances at the Mirage, and the closure affected 267 workers. For six months, the resort's roadside sign on the Las Vegas Strip continued to advertise Siegfried & Roy's show as a tribute. Mantacore became a permanent resident in the resort's Secret Garden attraction, after Horn insisted that the animal be spared.

The entry road leading onto the property was named Siegfried and Roy Drive in 2020, honoring the duo and their impact on the resort's success. In 2024, their statue was donated to the city's Neon Museum for preservation.

=== Love ===
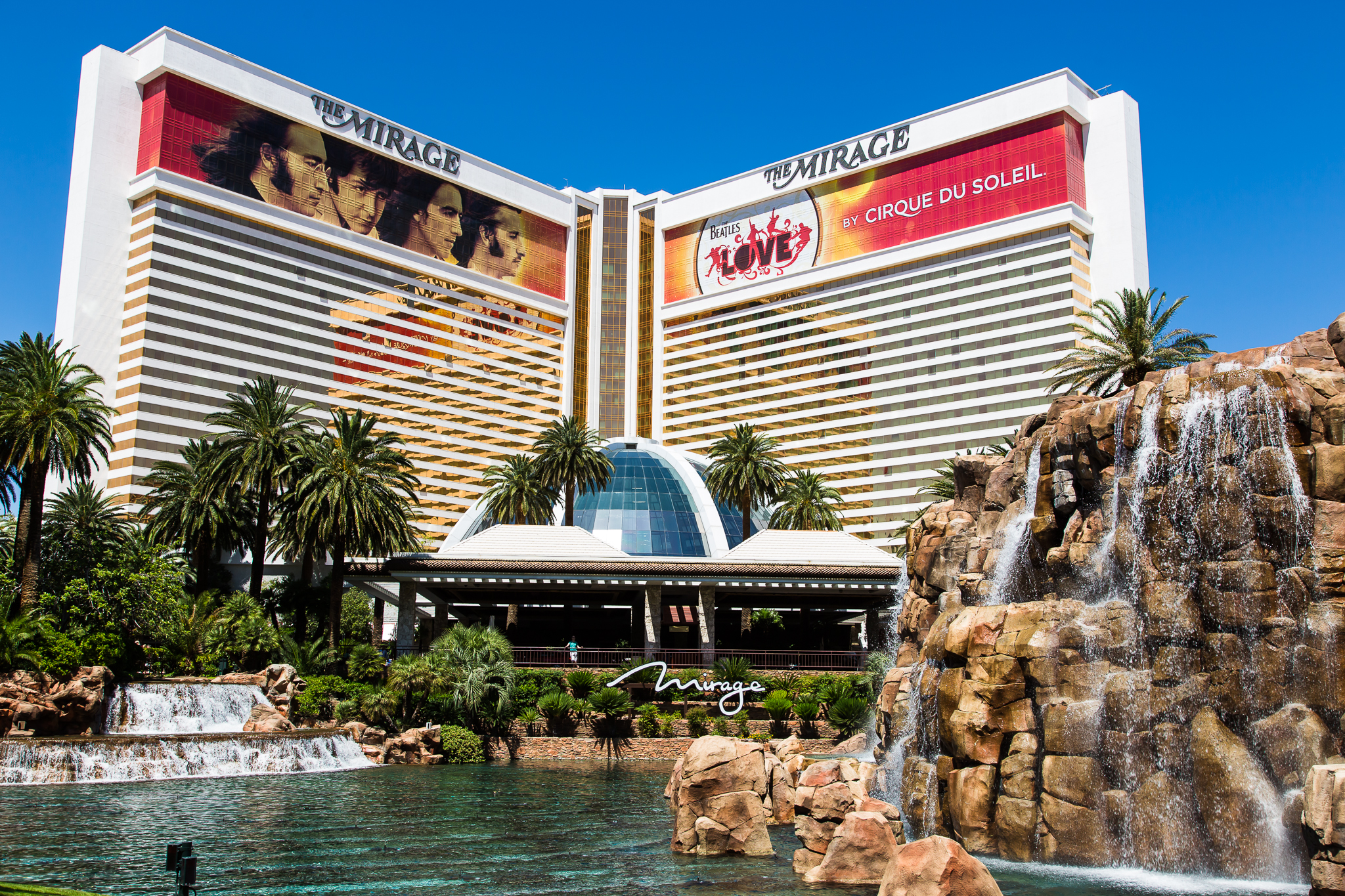
Hotel tower advertisements for Love

Overall, resort profits were hurt following the cancellation of Siegfried & Roy's show. In August 2004, their former theater was gutted to make way for a $100 million venue, which would accommodate a Cirque du Soleil show based on the Beatles, in partnership with Apple Corps. The show had been in development for years. The revamped theater includes 2,000 seats, the largest of any Cirque du Soleil stage in Las Vegas. It has 6,000 speakers.

The show, titled Love, opened in June 2006 and featured music by the Beatles. Giant banners advertising the show were added onto the hotel tower. The show was successful, receiving eight million visitors in its first 10 years. It closed on July 7, 2024, as part of the Hard Rock transition.

== In popular culture ==
Cher's 1991 CBS special Cher Extravaganza: Live at the Mirage was taped during stops of the singer's 1990 Heart of Stone Tour. The Mirage's theater was used for a scene in the 1992 film Pure Country. The Mirage is prominently featured at the end of City Slickers II: The Legend of Curly's Gold. The resort is also featured in the 1996 film Sgt. Bilko. Wynn allowed portions of the Mirage to be closed for production of the 1997 film Vegas Vacation, which features the resort prominently, including its pool area, and its Siegfried & Roy show. The Mirage appears in the background of a 1998 King of the Hill episode "Next of Shin" as Hank, Dale, and Bill search for Hank's father Cotton in Las Vegas.

In 2000, filming took place there for the season-five finale of Nash Bridges. The Mirage is also one of three Las Vegas casinos robbed in the 2001 film Ocean's Eleven, and is featured in the 2004 video game Grand Theft Auto: San Andreas, under the name "The Visage". In 2009, the Love theater was featured in the finale episode of The Amazing Race 15. Various areas of the resort, including its roadside sign, were also featured in the finale episode of The Amazing Race 24, aired in 2014.

The musical group The Killers named their 2020 album Imploding the Mirage, after the resort.

== See also ==
- List of largest hotels
- List of integrated resorts
