= Killing Time (1998 film) =

- Directed by: Bharat Nalluri
- Written by: Neil Marshall; Fleur Costello; Caspar Berry
- Produced by: Richard Johns
- Starring: Craig Fairbrass; Nigel Leach; Kendra Torgan
- Cinematography: Sam McCurdy
- Edited by: Neil Marshall
- Music by: Alan Ari Lazar; Christopher Slaski
- Distributed by: Pilgrim Films; Metrodome Films
- Release date: 30 January 1998
- Running time: 89 minutes
- Country: United Kingdom
- Language: English

Killing Time is a 1998 British crime film written by Neil Marshall and directed by Bharat Nalluri.

== Plot ==
After the mobster who murdered his partner is acquitted, semi-corrupt detective Robert Bryant hires beautiful Italian female assassin Maria to kill the mobster. When Bryant discovers that he cannot afford Maria's services, he is forced to hire another assassin, Madison, to kill her. Maria survives and sets out to collect what's owed to her, one way or another.

Most of the movie takes place in a hotel room where the criminals come one by one to kill off the hitwoman.

The hitwoman, in between taking a bath, listening to instructional tapes and listening to music, dispatches all the thugs one by one.

While the thugs sit around and wait to hear back from whichever one they've sent off to kill the hitwoman, the police officer Bryant and his partner investigate an antique store killing, which rapidly becomes a debate about character when Bryant's partner quickly figures out that Bryant is involved.

== Cast ==
- Craig Fairbrass as Det. Robert Bryant
- Nigel Leach as Jacob Reilly
- Kendra Torgan as Maria
- Peter Harding as Madison
- Rick Warden as Smithy

== See also ==
- List of British films of 1998
