= Oppe =

Oppe or Oppé may refer to the following people

Given name

- Oppe Pinto (born 1963), Paraguayan boxer

Surname

- Paul Oppé (1878–1957), English art historian, critic, and museum official
- Tom Oppé (1925–2007), English paediatrician, nephew of Paul

== See also ==
- Oppes
