= Tony Kendall (poker player) =

English poker player

- Nickname: tikay
- Born: Middlesex, England

World Series of Poker
- Bracelet: None
- Money finish: 1
- Highest WSOP Main Event finish: None

European Poker Tour
- Title: None
- Final table: None
- Money finish: 1

Anthony (Tony) James "tikay" Kendall (born in Middlesex) is an English professional poker player, based in Derbyshire.

== Biography ==
Anthony lost his mother at the age of four months, as she died from cancer. He was raised by the help of his aunts and uncles, as his father had 11 siblings. Tony had psychological and learning difficulties when growing up – as he could not read or write at the age of 15, but nowadays reads a book every week.

Kendall worked as an apprentice building merchant, but was given a break by John Kirkland, who allowed him to set up a company. The company went on to make a turnover of £53,000,000 per annum, allowing Kendall to retire early and concentrate on poker.

== Career ==
He shared his beginning on the poker circuit with Julian Thew and Ian Oldershaw. In 2003 Kendall finished in the money of three tournaments, scooping over $5,000. His highest finish was at the £100 pot limit Omaha event at the Napoleons Owlerton Casino, Sheffield on 12 June 2003. He finished 5th out of 69 entries and 94 rebuys.

2004 was a busy year for Kendall, seeing him cash in ten tournaments. His highest finish and prize money was 2nd and $14,386, at the £150 pot limit hold'em Grosvenor Grand Challenge 2004 at the Grosvenor Casino, Luton on 23 January. The tournament saw 129 entrants and 315 rebuys. He earned $51,014 in prize money throughout the year, and began writing articles on The Hendon Mob and for Poker Europa.

2005 was an even busier year for Kendall, as he cashed in fifteen tournaments. Kendall cashed in events of both the World Series of Poker (WSOP) and the European Poker Tour (EPT). Although entering both of these prestigious tournaments his highest earning tournament of that year (and his career to date), was at the SportingOdds.com London Poker Masters at the Gutshot Card Club, London on 1–2 October. Although he finished runner-up, he collected $27,895 in prize money. This was his highest earning yet to date, accumulating over $63,000. He was invited to Screen Test as a Presenter for Poker 425, & got the job, the show airing nightly for the rest of the year. He also became a contributor to Cardplayer Europe, continued to write for Poker Europa, started up www.blondepoker.com with Dave and Rhowena Colclough in January. Accepted an offer from Sporting Odds to become their Site Pro.

He began presenting on the Sky Poker channel in October and was offered the role of Poker Consultant, which he accepted. He later screen-tested for an analysts role on the same show, where he was given the job as the Grandad of Sky Poker. He was hired by William Hill to help organise, host, and run their four Land-Based Qualifiers for the William Hill Grand Prix. Kendall became the chairman and one of the founders of the Amateur Poker Association & Tour (APAT).

As of 2025, his career earnings exceed $400,000.
