= Foyle's War series 7 =

Foyle's War
- Series 7
- No. of episodes: 3

Release
- Original network: ITV
- Original release: March 24 – April 7, 2013

Series chronology
- ← Previous; Series 6 Next → Series 8

Series 7 of the ITV programme Foyle's War first aired in 2013, beginning Sunday 24 March. Comprising three episodes, the events in this season take place in August and September 1946.

== Episodes ==
=== "The Eternity Ring" ===
Writer: Anthony Horowitz	Director: Stuart Orme	Airdate: 24 March 2013 (UK)	Net duration: 87 minutes	Set: August 1946	Viewers: 8.58 million
Guests: Ken Bones, Stephen Boxer, Nicholas Jones, Kate Duchêne, Gyuri Sarossy, Joe Duttine, Dylan Charles, Jennifer Hennessy, Sam Clemmett, Emma Lowe, Nathan Gordon, Jeremy Swift, Gabrielle Lloyd
After a year in the US, Foyle returns by ship to the UK, where he is intercepted at immigration and "invited" to a meeting with British intelligence, which includes an old acquaintance, Hilda Pierce. MI5 suspects that British atomic research has been infiltrated by the Soviets, possibly via physicist Professor Michael Fraser, for whom Foyle's former driver Samantha Wainwright, nee Stewart, works as secretary. Foyle – whose neutrality, police expertise, and instincts are sought after – is reluctant to get involved. But he realises that investigation by anyone else may disadvantage Wainwright. The trail of evidence he uncovers leads back to an intelligence "house of cards", when Foyle detects that the so-called Eternity spy ring is part of a power play by Pierce to oust her supervisor. He also discovers the reason behind Fraser's theft of Uranium 233 from the Arnwell Atomic Research Facility was the hope of preventing more use of nuclear weapons. At the end of the episode, Pierce asks Foyle to join MI5. He accepts.

==== Cast and characters ====
Foyle returns from a trip to the US, where he pursued former industrialist and subsequently senator Howard Paige ("Fifty Ships"). Paige committed suicide, allegedly after being hounded by Foyle, although Foyle was unaware of Paige's death. The episode reintroduces the recurring character of Hilda Pierce, played by Ellie Haddington ("War Games", "The French Drop" and "All Clear"), turning her into a regular MI5 character with Foyle as one of her operatives. It also introduces the regular character of Arthur Valentine, another MI5 operative played by Tim McMullan.

The episode reintroduces Adam Wainwright, now Stewart's husband, as a Labour candidate in a forthcoming parliamentary by-election, though he is played by a new actor (Daniel Weyman, as opposed to Max Brown previously). Sergeant Frank Shaw, a former Hastings constable and POW, struggles as he returns from Singapore to a family and reality that have changed and evolved in the six years he was absent.

==== Background and production ====
The episode begins with the 16 July 1945 Trinity nuclear test in New Mexico, USA, and is framed within the rising mistrust of the developing Cold War between the West and the Soviets. The nuclear scientists portrayed in the episode, Dr. Max Hoffman and Prof. Michael Fraser, are loosely based on John von Neumann and Klaus Fuchs, respectively.

In the episode, Samantha Wainwright appears on a Routemaster bus of a type that was not first built until 1954.

=== "The Cage" ===
Writer: David Kane	Director: Stuart Orme	Airdate: 31 March 2013 (UK)	Net duration: 86 minutes	Set: August–September 1946	Viewers: 7.08 million
Guests: Rupert Vansittart, Jonathan Hyde, Laura Way, Rufus Wright, Jeremy Swift, Ross Armstrong, Simon Coury, Alexandra Clatworthy, Radosław Kaim, Ruth McCabe
As new MI5 chief Sir Alec Meyerson assumes control of the department, three Russian defectors housed in apparent safe houses are killed by Soviet agents. Valentine, in charge of the safe houses, becomes desperate to find answers. The situation is complicated by the brutal death of another Russian, Grigory Palenko, and of Ian Ross, the doctor who attempted to save him. Two women, both named Evelyn Greene, have disappeared. One, a Foreign Office Russian translator, is later located in the Russian sector of Berlin, while the other simply happens to share the same name. Foyle, aided by Sam Wainwright, now his assistant, begins by tracing a NKVD tattoo noted on the dead Russian, which leads him to the secretive Barton Hall. Here, he uncovers details of a covert military interrogation operation, and he sends in an operative to rescue the innocent Greene. In the process, he exposes Major James McDonald as a Russian sympathiser, responsible for both Greene incidents and the murders of Palenko and Ross.

==== Cast and characters ====
Adam Wainwright, with the support of his wife, wins the West Peckham by-election as a Labour Party candidate.

==== Background and production ====
Much of this story is loosely based on the real "Tin Eye", Lieutenant Colonel Robin Stephens, who ran Camp 020, an interrogation centre near London during the Second World War. References are also made in the episode to housing and food shortages, food rationing, the Lend-Lease programme and abuses of the Official Secrets Act. Women's multi-style coupon buster shoes, fashionable at the time, also serve as a plot point as does Dr Ian Ross' tick-borne tropical disease research.

=== "Sunflower" ===
Writer: Anthony Horowitz	Director: Andy Hay	Airdate: 7 April 2013 (UK)	Net duration: 89 minutes	Set: September 1946	Viewers: 7.39 million
Guests: Tamzin Outhwaite, Rupert Vansittart, Daniel Weyman, Daniel Hill, Charles Aitken, Lars Eidinger Jeremy Swift, Richard Dillane, Andrew Tiernan, Jimmy MacDermott
Foyle investigates threats against a former senior Nazi SS officer, Brigadeführer Karl Strasser, now living undercover in London as a Dutch art history professor and protected by MI5 in exchange for providing counter-Soviet intelligence. While working for Pierce, Strasser had proven his value by exposing "Red 5", a Soviet network operating in Sweden. However, American officials led by Lt. Col. Hoyt Jackson want him arrested and turned over as a war criminal. Meanwhile, Capt. Thomas Nelson, a survivor of a massacre led by Strasser, who still suffers from PTSD, spots Strasser on the street and begins following and threatening him. Foyle becomes aware of Strasser's war crimes in Normandy in 1944 and interviews Nelson, who tells him how Strasser gave the command to execute the U.S. Army soldiers he'd been working with, even though they had surrendered, so not in accordance with the conventions of war. Foyle exposes his superior's attempts to foil the Americans by faking Strasser's death. He contemplates the need to protect the German for the "greater good" of the information he offers, but Strasser is ultimately arrested by the Americans after a tip-off from Valentine.

==== Cast and characters ====
Foyle's personal life is not addressed in this episode, apart from his increasing work collaboration with Valentine. Much of the character focus in the episodes of this series centres on the developing personal lives of Sam Wainwright, news of her pregnancy, and the evolving political career of her husband. Adam Wainwright, now a PPS. He exposes a politically influenced land overvaluation, leading to the resignation of his minister from parliament (cf. the Crichel Down affair).

In several scenes, Adam Wainwright is shown discussing the Royal Air Force strikes of 1946 with the minister. The incidents began early in January 1946 in the Indian Subcontinent and spread to other stations in Asia, involving up to 50,000 personnel who were protesting the slow demobilization and return of troops to Britain.

==== Background and production ====
The film is based on the massacre of 26 US soldiers known as "Operation Sonnenblume (Sunflower)". The actual Operation Sonnenblume happened in North Africa in 1941, but the incident has similarities with the later Malmedy massacre in Belgium. In August 1944, an important battle within the wider Normandy Campaign took place at Mortain – the village with the sunflower farm referred to in the episode - part of the eventual allied successes in the Falaise Pocket. In the show, the Americans attempt to pressure MI5 into handing over Strasser by threatening the 1943 BRUSA Agreement and loan terms that the US has extended to the UK.

== International broadcast ==
Series Seven was broadcast in the United States on PBS stations on Masterpiece Mystery! as Foyle's War VII on 15, 22 and 29 September 2013, and on Netflix as of April 2014. In Australia it was on ABC weekly from 5 January 2014.
