= Foyle's War series 3 =

Foyle's War
- Series 3
- No. of episodes: 4

Release
- Original network: ITV
- Original release: October 24 – November 14, 2004

Series chronology
- ← Previous; Series 2 Next → Series 4

Series 3 of the ITV programme Foyle's War was first aired in 2004; comprising four episodes, it is set in early 1941. Series 3 was broadcast in the United States on PBS on Mystery!, on 11, 18, and 25 September, and 2 October 2005 as Foyle's War III, and on Netflix as of April 2014.

== Episodes ==
=== "The French Drop" ===
| Writer: Anthony Horowitz | Director: Gavin Millar | Airdate: 24 October 2004 | Net duration: 94 minutes | Set: February 1941 | Viewers: 9.10 million |
Guests: Ronald Pickup, Angela Thorne, Samuel West, Deborah Findlay, Timothy Carlton, Tony Haygarth, Lydia Leonard
In occupied France, a British agent named "Facteur" is killed when he steps on a mine after parachuting in near Rouen. The agent is linked to a tense standoff between Major General Sir Giles Messinger of MI6, formerly the director of Section D, and Colonel James Wintringham of Special Operations Executive (SOE). Back in Hastings, a body is found after an explosion in a bookshop. Although it appears that the dead man is Messinger's son William, who had committed suicide, the facts available are inconsistent. Following the trail to the SOE and their "dirty warfare" training centre at Hill House, Foyle meets Wintringham and Hilda Pierce. With the help of Milner and Stewart, he is slowly able to uncover the true identity of the body and the story behind it. Foyle then reveals that William Messinger and Facteur are the same person and that the explosion and body-theft were part of a cover-up in order to avoid SOE being shut down by MI6. He decides to remain quiet for now over SOE's blunders regarding the "Facteur" mission and accepts accusations of mis-investigation from Messinger, losing the naval security job he had been hoping for but believing he has best aided the war effort.

==== Cast and characters ====
In Hastings, Foyle and Milner (whose marriage is now breaking up) spend time dealing with petty crimes and black marketeers. Foyle, wanting to do more to help the war effort, goes to the Admiralty to see his brother-in-law Commander Charles Howard in hope of being offered a job at Naval Command in Liverpool. This ultimately fails. Foyle also has a run-in at SOE with an ex-con called Mason (alias Leo Maccoby) whom he had helped send to prison some four years earlier. Stewart returns to her hometown with Foyle, where they meet her uncle Aubrey Stewart, the local vicar. This episode features the second of three appearances by the recurring character Hilda Pierce, played by Ellie Haddington (previously in the Series 2 episode "War Games", and then in the Series 5 episode "All Clear"); she then becomes a lead character in Series 8.

==== Background and production ====
The title of the episode is taken from the phrase "French drop", which is a well-known vanishing trick involving sleight of hand. Horowitz was also inspired by the Special Operations Executive, which Churchill created in 1940 to develop techniques of sabotage and subversion. By setting the story in the early days of the SOE, Horowitz was able to use the conflict between the new SOE and the older yet under-prepared Security Service and Secret Intelligence Service as a backdrop to the plot. Many of the details are authentic, such as the use by the SOE of carborundum powder to disable cars, and some characters are based on people involved with the SOE, such as the former Shanghai Municipal Police officer William E. Fairbairn and Hilda Pierce, based on the real-life Vera Atkins. Throughout the episode, numerous people are also seen carrying around gas masks in small cardboard boxes with a carry string attached, indicating the concern about possible chemical weapon attacks of the time.

=== "Enemy Fire" ===
| Writer: Anthony Horowitz | Director: Gavin Millar | Airdate: 31 October 2004 | Net duration: 93 minutes | Set: February 1941 | Viewers: 8.15 million |
Guests: Bill Paterson, Peter Blythe, Simon Woods, Jonathan Slinger, Alexandra Moen, Shaun Dooley, John Wood, Richard Huw, Martin Turner
The RAF requisitions Digby Manor as a burns medical unit led by surgeon Patrick Jamieson and Dr. Brian Wrenn. Group Captain Lawrence Smythe is dubious of Jamieson's unconventional yet effective methods. The manor's owner, Sir Michael Waterford, and his housekeeper, Mrs. Roecastle, are troubled by their eviction but comply. Numerous acts of petty sabotage then occur at the manor, and investigations reveal it to be work of the housekeeper, upset at the requisition. Peter Preston, the new ARP warden, informs Wrenn of his wife's affair. Andrew Foyle is relieved when his friend Greville Woods is sent on a night reconnaissance mission instead of him. At the end of the mission, Woods crashes and suffers serious burns. Andrew goes AWOL in Stewart's flat, suffering from severe exhaustion. Gordon Drake, a central figure in the story, with connections to everyone, is murdered. Foyle and Milner are able to determine that, even though Wrenn initially assaulted Drake, it was Preston, his brother-in-law, who killed him over his abusive treatment of Preston's sister Beryl.

==== Cast and characters ====
Foyle is shown visiting the grave of his wife on the ninth anniversary of her death. The tombstone reads: "Rosalind Foyle, June 1902 – February 1932, RIP". Wrenn is the surgeon who had amputated Milner's leg. On returning to the squadron, Andrew Foyle receives a promotion to flight lieutenant and is transferred to a training position by Wing Commander Turner, who understands his exhaustion and the service he has already performed.

==== Background and production ====
The hospital and its patients are broadly based on the work of Archibald McIndoe and his "guinea pigs". Waterford's story of battle-fatigue and self-injury 25 years ago parallels that of Woods' injuries and Andrew Foyle's stress in this war. Andrew Foyle's transfer to a training position at an Operational Training Unit (OTU) is slightly inaccurate. 605 Squadron was a front line unit in February 1941, and RAF Debden did not have an OTU until March 1941, when No. 52 OTU formed to train fighter pilots using the Hawker Hurricane, so it would be unlikely for him to fly a Spitfire to a unit with Hurricanes. The scenes at the "factory" where Ann Preston worked, were filmed at Hangar 3 at IWM Duxford featuring The Old Flying Machine Company's Spitfire from Series 1.

=== "They Fought in the Fields" ===
| Writer: Rob Heyland | Director: Jeremy Silberston | Airdate: 7 November 2004 | Net duration: 92 minutes | Set: April 1941 | Viewers: 8.48 million |
Guests: Nigel Terry, Joe Armstrong, James Wilby, Stella Gonet, Anatole Taubman, Paula Jennings, Trevor Cooper
After an air raid, two Luftwaffe airmen, Sabatowski and Schimmel, are captured and handed over to the POW interrogation service's Major Cornwall. On Hugh Jackson's farm, his son Tom (who works as a guard at the POW camp) finds his father shot dead in an apparent suicide. Also on the farm are two Land Girls, Rose Henshall and Joan Dillon, and wood selector Barbara Hicks. Soon another German airman, Weiser, is found nearby with his pistol missing, and he is taken to the camp's infirmary by Cornwall. Irregularities come to light after examining Jackson's body. Foyle finds blood on the floor of the farm shed, while Milner finds what appears to be freshly dug grave, which contains a pig carcass, revealing black marketeering at the farm. Andrew Neame, the man believed to have run away with Jackson's wife 11 years earlier, is found living in the woods nearby and denies running away with her. Foyle learns Henshall is pregnant with Hugh Jackson's child. The truth is revealed - that Jackson killed and buried his wife, that Weiser is a secret German agent sent to silence Sabatowski, and he shot Jackson after being discovered.

==== Cast and characters ====
Foyle is shown to understand German (in addition to French from the last episode) due to his service in the previous war. He also explains that he was part of a police football team that played while in Germany in 1936. Stewart is scoffed at by Dillon because of her "cushy" driving job, and she decides to help the Land Girls with the potato crop.

==== Background and production ====
With the air and sea campaigns around the UK, POW camps were set up, as depicted in this episode. The programme also focuses on the voluntary service of the Women's Land Army, started by the government in June 1939 to increase agricultural production.

=== "A War of Nerves" ===
| Writer: Anthony Horowitz | Director: Gavin Millar | Airdate: 14 November 2004 | Net duration: 94 minutes | Set: June 1941 | Viewers: 8.19 million |
Guests: Peter Capaldi, Peter-Hugo Daly, Charles Pemberton, David Westhead, Dugald Bruce Lockhart, Joanna Horton, Angela Curran
Seeking to crack down on organised crime, Milner goes undercover in the building business and finds evidence of racketeering at the Talbot Shipyard. Assistant Commissioner Rose directs Foyle to investigate communist leader Raymond Carter, who is in Hastings with his fiancée, painter Lucinda Sheridan, who Foyle later learns is Rose's daughter. Carter rebukes Foyle for his inquiry and Sheridan goes on to explain Carter's commitment to the People's Convention. A bomb disposal unit – composed of Royal Engineers Captain Ralph Hammond, Jack Archer, and Ernest Jones – is called to defuse an unexploded bomb at the shipyard, where they find and steal a cache of money. Foyle later learns from shop steward and union agitator, Derek Woodgate, that while the Talbot brothers have been receiving wages for 400, only 200 people actually work at the yard. Jones is abducted and later found dead, killed by the Talbots' henchmen. Hammond tells the Talbots that he will return the stolen money to them, in exchange for some of the cash. He booby traps the suitcase supposedly containing the money, killing himself, the Talbot brothers and Jones's killers. The embezzled funds are returned to the government.

==== Cast and characters ====
In this episode, it is revealed that Sergeant Eric Rivers, who normally mans the police station's front desk, has a daughter named Gwen. Stewart agrees to give evidence on behalf of Jack Archer, Gwen's fiancé, later agreeing to be her bridesmaid.

==== Background and production ====
The Chatham Dockyards provided the location for the shipyard, featuring both HMS Ocelot and HMS Cavalier. The shipyard racket is based on a real case of fraud by Frederick Porter of Liverpool in 1942, whose ship scaling business embezzled over £300,000 from the government. Rose also invokes Defence Regulation 18B as an extra-legal means of getting to Carter. The episode ends with the announcement of Operation Barbarossa, the German invasion of the Soviet Union.

== International broadcast ==
Series 3 was broadcast in Australia on ABC weekly from 6 February 2005, in the United States on PBS on Mystery!, on 11, 18, and 25 September, and 2 October 2005 as Foyle's War III, and on Netflix as of April 2014.
