= Foyle's War series 2 =

Season of television series

Foyle's War
- Series 2
- No. of episodes: 4

Release
- Original network: ITV
- Original release: November 16 – December 7, 2003

Series chronology
- ← Previous; Series 1 Next → Series 3

Series 2 of the ITV programme Foyle's War was first aired in 2003; comprising four episodes. It is set in autumn 1940. Series 2 was broadcast in the United States on PBS on Mystery!, on 18 and 25 July, and 1 and 8 August 2004, as Foyle's War II, and on Netflix as of April 2014.

== Episodes ==
=== "Fifty Ships" ===
Writer: Anthony Horowitz	Director: Giles Foster	Airdate: 16 November 2003	Net duration: 99 minutes	Set: September 1940	Viewers: 9.30 million
Guests: Clive Merrison, Amanda Root, Janine Duvitski, Tom Georgeson, Geoffrey Chater, Nicholas Le Prevost, Henry Goodman, Guy Henry, Bryan Dick
The building where Samantha Stewart has rented a room is partially destroyed by a bomb, and Foyle learns of the theft of a coin collection from the damaged building. Stewart, now homeless, bunks temporarily with Milner, until his wife comes home one night unexpectedly when the two are dancing. Stewart then creeps into the station to sleep in a police cell. Foyle investigates the apparent suicide of an alcoholic handyman from Yorkshire, Richard Hunter, who had studied at Oxford University at the same time that American millionaire, Howard Paige, was there as a Rhodes Scholar. They shared an interest in car construction. Hunter's son Kenneth works as an auxiliary firefighter. He and his comrades are looting bombed-out houses. Foyle has their base searched, initially without success. Meanwhile, Hans Maier, a "Dutch refugee" who has arrived in a small boat on the coast is arrested. When he turns out to be a German spy, he faces execution. Surprisingly his cousin, the wife of the local doctor, lives nearby and seems complicit in his arrival. Foyle's investigations reveal Paige stealing Hunter's concept for a synchromesh gearbox and murdering him. Hans Maier had provided vital information. Stopped by Paige's minder from arresting the American, who is supposedly convincing the U.S. to supply arms to the U.K., Foyle vows to bring Paige to justice after the war.

==== Cast and characters ====
This episode introduces Christopher Foyle's former love, Elizabeth Lewes, whom he had hoped to marry over 20 years ago, if his suit had not been denied by her father, who did not want a policeman as a son-in-law. Lewes claims that she never loved her husband although he was always kind. She has two sons, one named Christopher, presumably after Foyle. She tries to seduce him, but without success.

It is established that Stewart is 22 years old. Foyle’s warning to Paige in this episode is later fulfilled in "The Eternity Ring" (Series 7, Episode 1), when Foyle returns from America having confronted Paige and perhaps provoked his suicide.

==== Background and production ====
The title refers to the Destroyers for Bases Agreement, under which the United States traded 50 U.S. Navy destroyers to the U.K. in exchange for land rights in British colonies. The agreement was a reversal of the U.S.'s isolationist policy and a precursor to the much more substantial Lend-Lease programme. The edition of the Eastbourne Chronicle announcing the visit of Paige to Hastings is dated "Wednesday September 14, 1940". Therefore, this episode starts the day after the Season 1 episode - "Eagle Day". The episode reveals a dark side of the war effort: those willing to profit in wartime at the expense of their countrymen. The subplot involving the capture of the character Hans Maier is based upon a real incident in which a German spy, Carl Meier, was caught when trying to row to the shore after being dropped by a submarine.

=== "Among the Few" ===
Writer: Anthony Horowitz & Matthew Hall	Director: Jeremy Silberston	Airdate: 23 November 2003	Net duration: 99 minutes	Set: September 1940	Viewers: 8.78 million
Guests: Damian O'Hare, Christina Cole, David Troughton, Sean Baker, Selina Cadell
At a Home Guard checkpoint, a lorry laden with wooden barrels rams the barricade and speeds off. Stewart and Foyle pursue the lorry and are shot at. Finally, the lorry goes off the road and explodes, killing the driver and revealing an illicit fuel racket based at the nearest centralised fuel depot. Since no undercover agent is available, Foyle allows Stewart, using her driving training, to infiltrate the depot run by manager Michael Bennett. She befriends another female driver, Connie Dewar, and is soon invited into the singles' world of dances, servicemen and "neutral" Irish labourers. She is surprised to learn that one of the young men in Dewar's group is Andrew Foyle. His best friend — and Dewar's beau — is another RAF pilot named Rex Talbot. Soon Stewart notices an irregularity at the depot, when Dewar fails to fully empty her fuel tanker. But before anything can be done, Dewar is found dead at the bottom of the stairs in her guesthouse. Foyle's investigations reveal that Dewar was four month pregnant; that the baby's father was the local nightclub manager — a racketeer tied to the fuel thefts and an attempted bombing of the depot — that Pamela Bennett, Michael’s wife, was organising the thefts; and how Talbot's homosexual attraction to Andrew led to Dewar's death.

==== Cast and characters ====
The relationship and sense of trust between Christopher Foyle and his son Andrew is tested when Foyle learns details of Andrew’s secret relationship with (and "engagement" to) Dewar's friend Violet Davies. Foyle again "bends the rules" in deference to the needs of wartime by allowing Talbot, who has confessed to accidentally causing Dewar's death, to lead the squadron on one last sortie, in which he is killed. He then consoles his own son by praising Talbot as a good man.

==== Background and production ====
This episode addresses petrol theft and black-marketeering in the new era of wartime rationing, in which petrol was the first item to be restricted.. The flying Supermarine Spitfire featured in this episode was Historic Aircraft Collection's Spitfire Mk.Vb BM597, and the airfield filming took place at Dunsfold.

=== "War Games" ===
Writer: Anthony Horowitz & Michael Russell	Director: Giles Foster	Airdate: 30 November 2003	Net duration: 99 minutes	Set: October 1940	Viewers: 8.90 million
Guests: Alan Howard, Emily Blunt, Christopher Benjamin, Ian Redford, Tim Preece, Laurence Fox
A young secretary, originally from Hastings, falls to her death from the high-rise London headquarters of a food manufacturing company. Soon afterwards, an unreported and apparently unrelated burglary occurs at the country house belonging to Sir Reginald Walker, the company's owner. The break-in draws Foyle's attention, particularly after Harry Markham, the prime suspect — recently released from prison and a member of the Home Guard — is shot and killed during "war games" on the Sussex Downs, for which Foyle is acting as referee. The situation is complicated by the return of a corrupt former police colleague, Jack Devlin, and the involvement of barrister Stephen Beck. A friend of Foyle's, Beck is a German who fled to Britain in 1935 and is now secretly working for British intelligence. He had met with Markham only days before his death, and he also knew the dead secretary. Using evidence collected by local children as paper salvage, Foyle confronts Walker and his son, Simon, uncovering their illicit connections with the Nazis and the younger Walker's hand in the two murders.

==== Cast and characters ====
This episode marks the brief return (prior to reassignment to North Africa with the 7th Armoured Division) of Foyle's former police sergeant, Jack Devlin. Now a British Army captain, Devlin left with the BEF for France and was wounded by shrapnel there. It also provides details of how Devlin was involved in planting evidence and perverting the course of justice in the Markham case six months earlier. Throughout the episode, Foyle is confronted with moral dilemmas and legal compromises made for the sake of the war. It also contains the first appearance of Hilda Pierce of British intelligence, played by Ellie Haddington, who later appears in the episodes "The French Drop" and "All Clear", before becoming a lead character in series 7 and 8.

==== Background and production ====
This episode introduces children competing to win a wartime salvaging competition by scavenging scrap aluminium, glass and used paper. It also deals with the looting of Jewish treasures and the war profiteering of British companies who continued trading with the Germans in contravention of the Trading with the Enemy Act 1939.

=== "The Funk Hole" ===
Writer: Anthony Horowitz	Director: Jeremy Silberston	Airdate: 7 December 2003	Net duration: 99 minutes	Set: October 1940	Viewers: 9.74 million
Guests: Joanna David, Nicholas Farrell, Jonathan Tafler
The theft of rationed goods from a government warehouse goes wrong when a home-guard shoots one of the perpetrators, 19-year-old Matthew Farley. When his mother reports him missing, investigations lead to a local guesthouse where Farley had worked, Brookfield Court, which is patronised by well-off Londoners with the means to move to safer territory. Matthew Farley is severely wounded, but no doctor is contacted and he finally dies and is buried in the woods of Brookfield Court. Around this time, Foyle is accused of making seditious remarks in a shelter during an air raid in London. Detective Chief Inspector Collier arrives from London to investigate, and Foyle is suspended and placed under house arrest. Investigations soon focus on Brookfield Court when Farley's body was uncovered in the woods, and the house is searched for contraband. The plot thickens when Frank Vaudrey, a London town councillor staying at Brookfield Court, is found dying. Milner is unconvinced by Collier's conclusion of suicide and risks his career by giving Foyle details of both cases. Foyle secretly travels to London, where he learns the truth of Vaudrey's complicity in the deaths of Collier's mother and sister during a botched air-raid evacuation – clear evidence that Collier is the killer.

==== Cast and characters ====
Andrew is on a week’s medical leave, after an emergency landing that went badly because of anti-aircraft defences on the coast. Stewart takes him out at his father's suggestion, but Andrew feels insulted. Later, he apologises to Stewart and takes her to see Gone With the Wind. After the movie, while walking back home, they kiss and maybe begin an affair. Meanwhile, Foyle's tense relationship with his boss's successor is shown, when Foyle arrives unannounced in London and confronts him over the handling of the case against him. During Foyle's absence, Stewart is compelled to return to her position at the Mechanised Transport Corps depot and is bullied by her superior officer. When Andrew is recalled to active service, he and Stewart decide to separate, as Foyle likes to compartmentilise everything and would not approve of the relation.

==== Background and production ====
In the first year of the war, the British government made dire predictions about the bombing in major cities and evacuated people to the countryside. Later, the government reversed these predictions but some people who had the means preferred to stay in temporary lodgings, out of danger. Such hotels and guest houses became known as "funk holes" because their residents' actions were regarded as cowardice. With food, especially meat in short supply due to rationing, the black market in foodstuffs was also a problem for the authorities.

== International broadcast ==
Series 2 was broadcast in Australia on ABC weekly from 25 April 2004, in the United States on PBS on Mystery!, on 18 and 25 July, and 1 and 8 August 2004, as Foyle's War II, and on Netflix as of April 2014.
