= Brian Poyser =

English actor (1934–2009)

Brian Poyser (1934 – 19 January 2009) was an English actor whose career started in the early 1960s. His appearances include the musical Poppy, the BBC Television Shakespeare (including a senator in Coriolanus, and Gower in Henry IV Part 1 and Henry V), the series Sex, Chips & Rock n' Roll, an episode of Agatha Christie's Poirot, and as the recurring character the Revd Aubrey Stewart in two episodes of Foyle's War ("The French Drop" and "Plan of Attack"). He also appeared in the films Lady Jane (1986), Parting Shots (1999), and as one of the English judges in the film The Messenger: The Story of Joan of Arc (1999). He also worked extensively for the RSC, including the Tokyo tour of King Lear. His last work was in the West End production of Nicholas Nickleby in 2007/8.
