= Foyle's War series 6 =

Foyle's War
- Series 6
- No. of episodes: 3

Release
- Original network: ITV
- Original release: April 11 – April 25, 2010

Series chronology
- ← Previous; Series 5 Next → Series 7

Series 6 of the ITV programme Foyle's War was first aired in 2010, beginning Sunday 11 April. Comprising three episodes, it is set in the period from June to August 1945.

== Episodes ==
=== "The Russian House" ===
Writer: Anthony Horowitz	Director: Stuart Orme	Airdate: 11 April 2010 (UK)	Net duration: 93 minutes	Set: June 1945	Viewers: 7.08 million
Guests: Eleanor Bron, Christopher Good, Tim Pigott-Smith, Marcel Iureș, Tom Goodman-Hill, Giles Taylor, Michael Elwyn, Dimitry Drannikov, Rob Heanley, Polly Maberly, Marek Oravec, Tom Brooke
In the prelude to the 1945 General Election, Foyle is still unable to resign, given the difficulty of finding a replacement. His former WWI commanding officer Brigadier Timothy Wilson asks for his help finding an escaped Russian prisoner of war, Ivan Spiakov, who had fought along with the Germans in Normandy. Seeking refuge, Spiakov meets a former POW colleague, Nikolai Vladchenko, then heads to "The Russian House" in London, supposedly a safe house for White Russians. From there he is moved to a hotel, which is raided by the army, and he is captured. Milner, a newly promoted detective inspector in Brighton, is called to Redwood Lodge to investigate the death of Sam Stewart's new employer, a famous artist who had also employed Vladchenko. Milner appears cool and distant when Foyle arrives at the scene, following on the trail of the Russians. Foyle's investigation leads him to the Russian House, which makes him the target of an attempted contract killing. Foyle learns of forced repatriations of former POWs to the Soviet Union, where they will probably be executed. If the practice is exposed, the complicity by the British government would be uncovered.

==== Cast and characters ====
Foyle is still chasing retirement after his resignation at the end of "All Clear," but his superiors are finding it hard to find a replacement. He gives them four weeks before stepping down for good. His former WWI CO, Brigadier Timothy Wilson, arrives from the War Office to enlist his help in the search of a German sympathiser and Russian POW. Milner, keen to step out of Foyle's shadow and prove himself, is now in Brighton with his new wife, Edie, and their recently born daughter, Clementine Elizabeth. Stewart has returned to civilian life and had just started as a domestic for the well-to-do artist, Sir Leonard Spencer-Jones. Another anti-communist Russian POW, who lives at the artist's house is a groundsman and a witness to the murder. While staying at the London hotel where Spiakov was captured, Stewart befriends Adam Wainwright, who is shot in the shoulder during the attempted hit on Foyle. When Sam visits him in hospital, she offers to help him at the Hastings guesthouse he recently inherited. Stewart brings Wainwright a bunch of bananas. However, the first shipment of bananas after the end of the war did not arrive in the U.K. until December 1945, five months after the events in the episode.

==== Background and production ====
The main theme of this episode is the emerging Cold War in post-war Britain and the commencement of the repatriation of enemy combatants from the UK. The future is bleak for Russian combatants – particularly for enemy sympathisers, anti-communists and those with knowledge of atrocities. Part of the plot is about members of the Russian Liberation Movement (White Russians), who are seeking to avoid Operation Keelhaul, their repatriation to the USSR. In this context, mention is made of Almanzora, a ship used by the British to transport returnees to Odessa, during the repatriation of Cossacks (and in which ex-servicemen from the West Indies migrated to Britain in 1947). The show should not be confused with the 1989 novel, The Russia House, by John le Carré; it is also notable that Michael Kitchen starred in the 1990 film adaptation of Le Carré's novel.

=== "Killing Time" ===
Writer: David Kane	Director: David Richards	Airdate: 18 April 2010 (UK)	Net duration: 92 minutes	Set: July 1945	Viewers: 7.09 million
Guests: Obi Abili, Adam James, Andrew Hawkins, Max Brown, Zoe Telford, Christopher Mellows, Sam Spruell, Neil McCaul, Nicholas Shaw, Trevor White, Victoria Lennox, Nicholas Gleaves, Joseph Long, Nick Dunning, Charlotte Riley, John Sharian
Sam Stewart and Adam Wainwright are running a dilapidated guesthouse where Mandy Dean, an unmarried mother with a mixed-race child, is lodging. Dean, who had been thrown out by her mother, is pennyless and can't pay her rent. Her situation is further complicated by the return of her former boyfriend, boxer Tommy Duggan who was sent to Scotland as a conscientious objector to dig drainage ditches. Foyle investigates a series of nighttime robberies of apparent war profiteers, leading him to the nearby US military base commanded by Major Wesker. The racist MP Calhoun runs an illegal betting ring. Dean's lover, Private Gabe Kelly, an African-American, appeals to Wesker to let him marry Dean but is later arrested for her murder. Foyle uncovers that MP Sergeant Calhoun and Wesker organised the robbery of the US payroll. Wesker strangles Dean after forcing her to have sex with him in return for a favourable treatment of her visa application. In the end, Kelly is transferred back to the states, and Duggan looks after Dean's daughter in the meantime.

==== Cast and characters ====
Foyle continues to work at the new Hastings Police Station, where he opposes a racial segregation order at the town council, and continues fly fishing. He donates several trout to Stewart, who invited him for dinner at the guesthouse. Foyle is supported by a new assistant detective, DC Hadley. Stewart and Wainwright slowly become closer as they help Dean and her baby.

==== Background and production ====
The primary theme in the episode is segregation in the US military of its soldiers and in locations visited by soldiers near to its bases (as seen in incidents such as the 1943 Battle of Bamber Bridge in Lancashire and the 1944 Park Street riot in Bristol). Another theme is conscientious objectors (conchies) returning to civilian life along with demobilised soldiers as well as the social stigma against single mothers and the aversion among white US officers against interracial relationships.

=== "The Hide" ===
Writer: Anthony Horowitz	Director: Stuart Orme	Airdate: 25 April 2010 (UK)	Net duration: 89 minutes	Set: August 1945	Viewers: 7.40 million
Guests: Max Brown, Georgie Glen, Richard Goulding, Anastasia Hille, Will Keen, Steven Pacey, Joseph Kloska, Hugh Ross, Andrew Scott, Maggie Service, David Yelland, Dominic Jephcott, Kirsty Besterman, Rupert Frazer, Leon Lissek, David Baron, Chris Wilson as DCS Clarke (uncredited).
Foyle finally leaves Hastings Police Station to his successor, DCS Clarke with very little ceremony. He arranges for a journey to the USA, before he learns that James Devereaux was arrested for joining the British Free Corps, a unit supporting Nazi Germany during the war. He starts to investigate the case. He visits Devereaux's lawyer and Devereaux himself. The damaged young man is unwilling to contest his treason case. Meanwhile, DI Milner is investigating the murder of Agnes Lyttleton, a secretary of Sir Charles Devereaux. The cases soon merge through Jack Stanford, a comrade of Devereaux in the Free Corps. Foyle discovers that the letters Devereaux was sending to Lyttleton, a childhood friend from the estate, contained coded information that she forwarded to British intelligence. After Devereaux went missing from the Free Corps, Stanford assumed the identity of "Jack" — a nickname Devereaux's mother Caroline used for her son — and continued the correspondence. Stanford murdered Lyttleton to prevent her testifying in support of Devereaux. Devereaux stayed silent to punish his father, who had murdered his wife as her young son watched unnoticed from a bird hide.

==== Cast and characters ====
It is revealed that Caroline Devereux nursed Foyle after an injury in World War I, and that they had an affair which ends when she discovers that she is pregnant and returns to her husband. After his resignation, Foyle plans to go to the US aboard the Queen Mary to "tie up some loose ends" — an oblique reference to his determination to bring Howard Paige to justice, since he was unable to do so in the episode "Fifty Ships". This episode sees the final appearance of Anthony Howell as Milner. Hastings council wants to pull down Hill House and build over the Green, but Foyle remembers archaeological finds that show a Roman cemetery existed on the site, and Wainwright uses this to oppose the plan. In the end, Hill House blows up, and Wainwright proposes to Sam among falling debris. In the last scene, they discuss their plans for marriage with Foyle.

==== Background and production ====
The episode starts with the firebombing of Dresden in February 1945 and ends by highlighting the role of Queen Mary in repatriating US troops. It also introduces MI9, whose primary role was to support European Resistance networks. The Devereaux estate, referred to as Whitefriars in the episode, is fictional but loosely based on the life of William Devereux. There was a three-year gap before the next series, aired in 2013.

== International broadcast ==
Series Six was broadcast in Australia on ABC weekly from 9 May 2010, in the United States on PBS stations on Masterpiece Mystery! as Foyle's War VI on 2, 9 and 16 May 2010, and on Netflix as of April 2014.
