= Eagle Day (disambiguation) =

Herman Sidney "Eagle" Day was a punter in the National Football League and a quarterback in the Canadian Football League. Eagle Day may also refer to:

- Eagle Day, known in German as Adlertag, the first day of operations in the German Operation Eagle Attack during the Battle of Britain
- "Eagle Day", an episode from the first series of the crime drama Foyle's War
- Eagle Day, the second novel in Robert Muchamore's Henderson's Boys series
