= Foyle's War series 4 =

Foyle's War
- Series 4
- No. of episodes: 4

Release
- Original network: ITV
- Original release: January 15, 2006 – April 15, 2007

Series chronology
- ← Previous; Series 3 Next → Series 5

Series 4 of the ITV programme Foyle's War was first aired in 2006. It is the only series to be divided into two parts, one comprising two episodes screened in 2006, and the other comprising two from 2007. It was the last series with four episodes; later series had only three. It is set in the period from March 1942 to March 1943.

== Episodes (Part 1) ==
=== "Invasion" ===
Writer: Anthony Horowitz	Director: Gavin Millar	Airdate: 15 January 2006	Net duration: 94 minutes	Set: March 1942	Viewers: 8.23 million
Guests: Jay Benedict, Zoë Tapper, Philip Jackson, John McArdle, Andrew MacLachlan, Peter Jonfield, Corey Johnson, Jonah Lotan, Keith Barron, Peter Youngblood Hills.
American engineers begin to arrive in Hastings, causing tension with the locals. David Barrett, owner of the farm at Hawthorn Cross, opposes the land requisition for an aerodrome. For Susan Davies, a local barmaid, their arrival represents an opportunity for adventure and freedom. Some six weeks later, an army friend of Milner's, Will Grayson, returns home on leave but dies in a house fire that seems an accident. Milner is shocked and begins to investigate. Captain Keiffer, commander of the American soldiers, invites Foyle to speak to his men about England and the English. Davies, now pregnant by an American GI, blackmails her boss Alan Carter into continuing to run a profitable illegal still on his property. She is soon found strangled at a dance held by the American soldiers. Initially her American boyfriend, whose dogtags were found in the dead girl's hands, becomes a suspect; then Barrett, and finally his nephew who had been engaged to Davies. The arrest of Carter because of the illegal still ends the investigation, as Foyle realises that he killed Davies to stop her profiting by selling the toxic alcohol that led to the death of Grayson.

==== Cast and characters ====
Station Sergeant Ian Brooke is transferred to Hastings from Deptford in London. Captain John Keiffer and his 215th Engineer Battalion (Aviation) to begin the construction of a US Army Air Force airfield nearby. Foyle is befriended by Keiffer, an engineer from Northbridge, Massachusetts, since the two share an interest in fly-fishing. Keiffer mentions the loss of his younger brother, who was serving on the destroyer USS Reuben James when it was sunk in October 1941. Milner's friend, Will Grayson, is a fellow survivor of the failed Norwegian Campaign who helped to rescue and evacuate Milner from Trondheim. Meanwhile, Andrew Foyle now stationed at RAF Debden, sends Stewart a Dear Jane letter. She accepts a date with Keiffer's driver, Private Joe Farnetti (which irks the senior Foyle, who thinks she is being unfaithful to his son).

==== Background and production ====
The arrival of American "Doughboy" forces in England began on 26 January 1942,. It marked the start of another dramatic change to the English war home front. Resentment against US forces (as expressed in the sayings "late to the last war, late to this one" or "over-sexed, over-paid and over here") began. Land requisitioning for military use increased sharply, while rationing of basic goods continued. RAF Debden, where the younger Foyle is stationed, demonstrates the transfer of resources to American Forces, when it was transferred to the Eighth Air Force some six months after this episode (on 12 September 1942). Filmed: March–April 2005.

=== "Bad Blood" ===
Writer: Anthony Horowitz	Director: Jeremy Silberston	Airdate: 22 January 2006	Net duration: 94 minutes	Set: August 1942	Viewers: 8.17 million
Guests: Peter Sandys-Clarke, Ben Meyjes, Philip Franks, Caroline Martin, Tom Harper, Roy Marsden, Jonah Lotan, Kenneth Colley, Gawn Grainger, Hugh Sachs, Tim Delap.
A secret biological warfare experiment with anthrax becomes dangerous when an infected sheep carcass is lost in transit. Martin Ashford, a Quaker conscientious objector, is accused of murdering DSM recipient Thomas Jenkins, a survivor of the Navarino sunk in Convoy PQ 17. Ashford's sister, Edith, now a nurse, asks her school friend Milner for help. Foyle agrees to look into the matter, but his visit to nearby Hythe irks his old friend DCS David Fielding. Investigations show that Ashford and Jenkins had a run-in at a local pub over Ashford's CO status and his affair with Jenkins's wife, Elsie. Foyle also investigates the theft of cattle from nearby Foxhall Farm, a property owned by Brian Jones, Jenkins's father-in-law, where Ashford was a labourer. Fielding gives Foyle the murder weapon, a trocar, belonging to veterinarian Ted Cartwright, who apparently lost it at Foxhall Farm. Cartwright's son Leonard had come to see Fielding to tell him Ashford could not have killed Jenkins. Meanwhile, Elsie Jenkins and Sam Stewart are both infected with anthrax. Henry Styles, another Quaker who had been observing Foxhall Farm, directs Foyle to Captain George Halliday, commander of the secret anthrax research facility, and assistant researcher Mark Wilcox. In the end, it is revealed that Ted Cartwright's son Leonard – who also survived the sinking of the Navarino, despite being shot by Jenkins – killed him to stop his bullying and duplicity.

==== Cast and characters ====
Joe Farnetti, Stewart's American boyfriend from California, proposes to her on the beach, but she stalls. Farnetti incorrectly states he did his training at Fort Benning in Virginia (Ft Benning is in Georgia). Edith Ashford, a school friend of Milner (and sister of the accused) expresses a romantic interest. Foyle and Fielding are shown to be old yet distanced colleagues and ex-WW1 soldiers. Fielding mentions "bad blood" after surviving a chlorine gas attack during the Second Battle of Ypres.

==== Background and production ====
Milner mentions the abolition of ration allowances for petrol for private motoring, a law which came into effect on 1 July 1942. Leonard Cartwright of Convoy PQ 17 and of the sinking of the Christopher Newport and Navarino, which happened on 4–5 July 1942 are mentioned. Simon Higgins (the blinded scientist on the bed) refers to The London School of Hygiene & Tropical Medicine; and Foyle is given streptomycin to treat Stewart - a chronological error, as streptomycin was not discovered until 1943. Filmed: April–May 2005

== Episodes (Part 2) ==
=== "Bleak Midwinter" ===
Writer: Anthony Horowitz	Director: Gavin Millar	Airdate: 11 February 2007	Net duration: 93 minutes	Set: December 1942	Viewers: 8.18 million
Guests: Ron Cook, Liz Fraser, Gavin Brocker, Paul Jesson, Caroline Martin, John Nettleton, John Kane, Ann Beach, Kate Ambler, Mali Harries, Sian Brooke
Foyle busts a restaurateur for offering illegal Christmas foods, which are confiscated as evidence. He begins to investigate the death of Grace Phillips, a munitions worker who was killed on the job, apparently through her own error. Tensions at her funeral cast suspicion on her scheming lover, Harry Osborne. Suspicion also falls on Milner when his estranged wife Jane is murdered after a public row between them in a restaurant. Meanwhile, another munitions worker, Phyllis Law, tries to blackmail factory foreman Eddie Baker over a collection Baker had taken up for Phillips's aging mother, since she discovered that Phillips was an orphan. Phillips and Jane Milner worked together as hairdressers before the war. Constable Peters admits manipulating evidence against Milner to get back at him over a reprimand in the Christmas food case. Stewart brings Foyle's car to the garage where Osborne works, but he attacks her when he learns she works for the police and stabs his co-worker after she flees. In the end, Foyle confronts Osborne in the cellar of the bank located next to the hairdresser's shop. Osborne admits asking Phillips to steal explosives he could use to break into the bank safe, and using rat poison to silence her. Osborne also killed Jane Milner to steal a condemnatory letter written to her by Phillips.

==== Cast and characters ====
The budding relationship between Milner and Ashford continues, but things are complicated by the return of Milner's wife Jane (Mali Harries) after an absence of more than a year. Stewart and Brooke spend the episode lobbying Foyle to eat a confiscated turkey before it spoils.

==== Background and production ====
This episode focuses on the problems within a war-time munitions factory, such as health and safety, as well as pay inequality for munitionettes. Jane Milner mentions the three-year separation cool-down period for a divorce under the Matrimonial Causes Act. It also revisits the theme of black-marketeering. Filmed: February–March 2006.

=== "Casualties of War" ===
Writer: Anthony Horowitz	Director: Tristram Powell	Airdate: 15 April 2007	Net duration: 94 minutes	Set: March 1943	Viewers: 7.89 million
Guests: Kate Fleetwood, Kevin Doyle, Michael Jayston, Stanley Townsend, Harry Eden, Abigail Cruttenden, Dermot Crowley, Gerard Kearns, Joshua Lewis
Two local youths, brothers Terry and Frank Morgan, break into a mansion but are blackmailed into working as saboteurs for the Spanish diplomat Josė de Perez. Milner is asked to infiltrate and investigate a gambling ring, as Foyle is confronted by the new straight-laced Assistant Commissioner Henry Parkins. Foyle's goddaughter Lydia Nicholson and her traumatised young son James come unexpectedly from London to stay. As Foyle struggles to adjust to sharing his house, things become more difficult when Lydia goes missing and is later found alive after a suicide attempt. A local man reports hearing a shot fired near a secret Admiralty research centre. A search of the area turns up the body of Michael Richards, a teacher with gambling debts, half-buried in the woods near the research centre where his wife Evelyn works. The leader of the facility, Professor Townsend, is initially unhelpful; later Evelyn Richards claims she was working late alone at the research centre when her husband arrived unexpectedly. When he began to attack a key piece of research equipment, she shot him to defend their work. Foyle arrests her, but Assistant Commissioner Parkins demands she be released. Meeting with Parkins later, Foyle asserts that Richards was lured to the centre by his wife and killed by her Danish lover Hans Lindemann. When he is prevented from bringing the culprits to justice due to the needs of the war effort, Foyle tenders his resignation.

==== Cast and characters ====
Stewart notes that The Wizard of Oz is playing at the Palace Theatre. She brings the Brighter Blackout Book (1939) to Foyle's house to amuse young James. When Milner chats with one of Michael Richards' students, they mention the Sexton Blake and Just William books.

==== Background and production ====
The episode touches upon the theme of immunity from justice, despite the war that aims to champion such noble ideals as British law and order. Much of the episode's historical content was inspired by the invention of the bouncing bomb and Operation Chastise (the Dambusters raid) of 1943, as portrayed in the film The Dam Busters. Writer Anthony Horowitz planned his story to "shadow" one aspect of the bomb's development; the episode depicts a group of scientists experimenting with a mechanism to put backspin on the bomb. The test sequence was designed to replicate the actual tests, including a depiction of the official cameraman, which allowed them to use archive footage. Another historical reference in this episode is to the Sandhurst Road School Disaster, in Catford, South East London, on 20 January 1943, in which 38 children and six teachers were killed, and some 60 other children and adults were injured. Filmed: March–April 2006

== International broadcast ==
The two episodes for part 2 screened in Denmark on 5 and 12 September 2006, some months before their ITV debut. In Australia all four were played on ABC weekly from 11 February 2007. Part 1 was broadcast in the United States on PBS on Mystery! on 17 and 24 June 2007, and part 2 on 1 and 8 July 2007, as Foyle's War IV. The series was added to Netflix as of April 2014.
