= Dr Jekyll and Mr Hyde (2002 film) =

2002 British film by Maurice Phillips

- DVD cover art
- Directed by: Maurice Phillips
- Written by: Martyn Hesford
- Based on: Strange Case of Dr. Jekyll and Mr. Hyde; 1886 novella by Robert Louis Stevenson
- Produced by: Murray Ferguson
- Starring: John Hannah; David Warner; Gerard Horan; Kellie Shirley
- Cinematography: Daf Hobson
- Edited by: Nick McPhee
- Music by: David Ferguson
- Distributed by: Universal Pictures
- Release dates: 2002 (UK): October 18, 2003; (US)
- Running time: 120 minutes 96 minutes (shorter version)
- Country: United Kingdom
- Language: English
- Budget: £750,000 (estimated)

Dr Jekyll and Mr Hyde is a 2002 British thriller film, and an adaptation of Robert Louis Stevenson's 1886 novella, directed by Maurice Phillips and starring John Hannah. Set in Victorian England, it was filmed in 2002 and released in Britain in that year. As the result of its release in the US in 2003, that date is sometimes attached to it.

== Plot ==
Dr Henry Jekyll experiments with the complexities of science and the duplicity of human nature, with the result that he is transformed into an evil character who calls himself Edward Hyde. Jekyll does not see that Hyde is a version of himself and develops a multiple personality disorder. After murdering women, Hyde frames Jekyll, who wishes to give himself up to the police, but Hyde intervenes, knowing that if Jekyll is hanged, Hyde will die too. Jekyll then kills himself.

== Production ==
The film was produced by John Hannah for his company Clerkenwell Films. It was filmed in Lithuania in 2002, and a number of Scottish actors gave the film a Scottish flavour. Originally intended for television, it was released on DVD in 2004.

== Cast ==
- John Hannah as Dr Henry Jekyll and Mr Edward Hyde
- David Warner as Sir Danvers Carew
- Gerard Horan as John Utterson
- Kellie Shirley as Mabel Mercer
- Jack Blumenau as Ned Chandler
- Brian Pettifer as Poole
- Janet Henfrey as Mrs Robey
- Ellie Haddington as Florrie Bradley
- Mel Martin as Rachel Carew
- John Rogan as Father Peter
- Elodie Kendall as Sarah Carew
- Ifan Meredith as Dr Arthur Lanyon
- Tilly Vosburgh as Mabel's Mother
- James Saxon as Dr Johnson
- Christopher Good as Dr Brown
- Marius Jampolskis as Boy With Note
- Lina Budzeikaite as Bruised Woman
