= Rob Heanley =

English actor

Rob Heanley is an English actor. He trained at the Royal Academy of Dramatic Arts from 2000 to 2003.

== Theatre ==
Heanley has worked on the West End stage, first appearing in the Olivier Award-nominated production of Journey's End. He has also played roles in London's fringe theatre, including in The Revenger's Tragedy at The Southwark Playhouse and The Wonder at the Battersea Arts Centre. He appeared in Strangers on a Train for The English Theatre Frankfurt in 2014, and in 2015, at The Orange Tree Theatre in Play Mas', directed by Paulette Randall. In 2015–16, Heanley played the leading role of Giles Ralston in Agatha Christie's The Mousetrap at St Martin's Theatre in the West End. In 2017, he played Captain Lesgate in Dial M for Murder at The New Vic Theatre.

== Television ==
His screen work includes the ITV series Foyles War (produced by Greenlit) as a Sergeant in the Pioneer Corps. Heanley played a police officer in the BBC series Spooks (produced by Kudos). In 2012, he played an MI6 officer in the BBC/HBO series Hunted, (produced by Kudos and Big Light Productions). In 2013, Heanley guest starred as Dr Ian Parks in the second series of the BBC drama Death in Paradise produced by Red Planet Pictures, set on the fictitious island of Saint-Marie and filmed on location on the Caribbean island of Guadeloupe. He has guest starred in Doctors, playing a politician in 2015.

== Film ==
In 2011, Heanley appeared on screen in the Bollywood sensation Patiala House, playing Simon Randall (Chairman of Selectors). As well as stars of Indian cinema (Akshay Kumar, Rishi Kapoor and Anushka Sharma), the film included appearances from numerous well known cricketers including David Gower, Graham Gooch and Nasser Hussain as selectors of the England Cricket team. In 2017, Rob joined the cast of the Walt Disney Studios film Dumbo, directed by Tim Burton, which was released in March 2019.

== Sport ==
Heanley plays amateur cricket for Roehampton Cricket Club and received recognition for his bowling figures (8-41) which were in the top 10 bowling performances for the 2009 season across all divisions in the Surrey League.

In April 2013, Heanley ran the Brighton Marathon for the charity Tommy's. He completed it in 04:09:22.

Heanley is a rugby union Referee in the RFU National Leagues. In November 2012, he was in Singapore to referee the International SCC7s. He refereed the Bowl final between Kenya Umpala and Swedish Vikings. In July and August 2013, he toured South Africa refereeing matches in Cape Town and across the Western Province.
