= Spies of Warsaw (TV series) =

British espionage drama

- Genre: Historical fiction
- Written by: Dick Clement; Alan Furst; Ian La Frenais
- Directed by: Coky Giedroyc (3 episodes); Weronika Migon (2 episodes); Kiaran Murray-Smith (2 episodes)
- Starring: David Tennant; Janet Montgomery; Marcin Dorociński; Mirosław Zbrojewicz; Ellie Haddington; Burn Gorman; Radosław Kaim; Linda Bassett; Allan Corduner; Anton Lesser
- Composer: Rob Lane
- Country of origin: United Kingdom
- Original language: English
- No. of series: 1
- No. of episodes: 4

Production
- Executive producer: Richard Fell
- Production locations: Kraków, Warsaw
- Cinematography: Wojciech Szepel
- Running time: 180 minutes total
- Production companies: Apple Film Productions; Arte France; Fresh Pictures; TVP1

Original release
- Network: BBC Four
- Release: 9 January – 16 January 2013

Spies of Warsaw is a British television miniseries in which a Deuxième Bureau intelligence agent (spy) poses as a military attaché at the French embassy in Warsaw, and finds himself drawn into the outbreak of World War II.

The television series takes its name from its source, The Spies of Warsaw, a 2008 spy novel by Alan Furst. The book was adapted for television in 2013 as a co-production of TVP1, BBC Four, BBC America, and ARTE and premiered in January in the United Kingdom and in April in the United States. It starred David Tennant as the protagonist Colonel Jean-François Mercier and Janet Montgomery as his love interest Anna Skarbek. As in other Alan Furst novels, the fictional Parisian restaurant Brasserie Heininger serves as one of the settings for dialogue.

== Cast ==
=== Main ===
Main cast includes:

- David Tennant - Jean-François Mercier
- Janet Montgomery - Anna Skarbek
- Marcin Dorociński - Antoni Pakulski

=== Support ===
Support cast includes:

- Mirosław Zbrojewicz - Marek
- Ellie Haddington - Madame Dupin
- Burn Gorman - Jourdain
- Radosław Kaim - August Voss
- Linda Bassett - Malka Rosen
- Allan Corduner - Viktor Rosen
- Anton Lesser - Doctor Lapp
- Piotr Baumann - Maxim Mostov
- Jan Pohl - Zoller
- Richard Lintern - Colonel Lessard
- Julian Glover - General Beauvilliers
- Fenella Woolgar - Lady Angela Hope
- Richard Teverson - Roddy Fitzware
- Tuppence Middleton - Gabrielle
- Tusse Silberg - Helena Skarbek
- Gregg Lowe - Young German Soldier
- Grazyna Zielinska - Wladzia
- Grzegorz Emanuel - Weasel
- Nicholas Blane - Papa Heiniger
- Dan Fredenburgh - Armand
- Julian Harries - Duff Cooper
- Ziggy Heath - Kazimir
- Bogdan Koca - Leszek
- Adam Godley - Julius Halbach
- Nicholas Murchie - Johannes Elter

== Episodes ==
There are four episodes, which have also aired as a two-part series.

== Reception ==
The two-part drama received some positive reviews in the UK, especially for the script and acting, although The Guardian described it as "pallid as much of the washed-out photography".

The Telegraph liked the series for many features: appropriateness for "intergenerational shared viewing, never... too visually brutal, and the playing of the minor characters... was convincingly understated". The Guardian complained: "It should have been the perfect spy thriller. It had everything. Except tension".

The New York Times found the series an "enjoyable, straightforward espionage tale without a lot of twists or extra layers" but deemed it "true to the original in story and in spirit", though slow-moving, and the Boston Globe thought it "a strangely bloodless affair".

Rotten Tomatoes rated the television series 64% from critics and 50% from average audience.
