= The Spies of Warsaw =

2008 spy novel by Alan Furst

First edition (publ. Random House)

The Spies of Warsaw is a 2008 novel by Alan Furst set in the years shortly before World War 2 and deals with espionage in Poland as various nations compete for influence and control over the nation's future. The story starts in October 1937 and ends in May 1938, with a one paragraph description outlining the future of two lead characters.

== Plot ==
Lieutenant Colonel Jean-Francois Mercier de Boutillon, a lately widowed aristocrat and decorated hero of World War I, has been transferred from the army staff in Beirut to Warsaw as the French military attaché and has built up an espionage network there. One member is posing as a countess and has started an affair with Edvard Uhl, a manager working on tank production in the Silesian city of Breslau. The countess can no longer afford the Warsaw apartment that serves as their love nest - nor can Uhl for long - but through Mercier she arranges for Uhl to cover her rent by passing on details of the latest tank in his production line.

On returning to Germany by train, Uhl suspects he is being watched by the Gestapo but is persuaded by Mercier to visit Warsaw one last time. In the meanwhile Mercier makes a clandestine visit to the very edge of the fortified German-Polish border and comes under fire. Afterwards he shares gossip with Soviet diplomats Viktor and Malka Rozen at a reception. During Uhl's next visit to Warsaw, Mercier manages to disrupt his kidnap by a team sent from Germany, thereby arousing their vindictive hate. As a result of the attempt on his agent, he is called to Paris to report to his superior, Colonel Bruner, who belongs to the faction of appeasers in the French war office, siding with Marshal Philippe Pétain.

Still in Paris, Mercier is befriended by General de Beauvilliers, a supporter of Charles de Gaulle, who is currently advocating mechanization of the French army for tank warfare. On his return he arranges for Uhl to escape to a new life abroad. He also makes the acquaintance of Anna Szarbek, a lawyer for the League of Nations, and over the next weeks replaces her fiancé, the Russian emigré journalist Maxim Mostov, as her lover.

Mercier's next assignment takes him to Schramberg, where he has to lie low all night in the forest and observe the German tank manoeuvers the next day. He then passes the Christmas-New Year period with his family at their property in the Drôme, reading up Heinz Guderian's articles on tank tactics and worrying about the impact of the future on ordinary people. Back in Warsaw, the Rozens have been recalled to Moscow and anticipate that this means being purged in Stalin's show trials. When they appeal to Mercier, he arranges for their escape in return for all the diplomatic papers that they can salvage. During their interrogation, evidence emerges that allows the Polish authorities to expel Maxim Mostov back to Russia.

At another diplomatic reception, Mercier makes the acquaintance of Dr Lapp, a member of the German military intelligence in touch with the Black Front, the anti-Hitler faction of the Nazi Party. But back in Germany, state security officer August Voss, blamed for the failed attempt to abduct Uhl, learns of his transfer to a dead-end office job. Gathering his team, he leaves for Warsaw to take his revenge on Mercier but is prevented in mid-attempt by Mercier's armed driver, Marek.

A final operation takes Mercier to Czechoslovakia, where he offers sanctuary to the exiled Black Front publicist, Julius Halbach. In return, Halbach must drive to Berlin with Mercier and contact a former unsuspected member of the organisation, Johannes Elter, now an army communications sergeant. From him Mercier obtains the German invasion plans against France and is surprised by Elter's decision to remain in his post and pass on more information rather than take up Mercier's offer to help him escape to Switzerland. However, Bruner chooses to ignore all the evidence that Mercier has gathered and, with Pétain, rely instead on the Maginot Line that the Germans are planning to bypass. Disgusted, Mercier decides to move permanently to Paris along with Anna and work with General de Beauvilliers there.

== Critical response ==
The Spies of Warsaw is the tenth novel in Furst's Night Soldiers series and reviewers met it with guarded praise. Though for the Library Journal, it brilliantly captures its socio-political setting, for Kirkus Reviews, the novel's lack of tension is only made up for by its "wonderfully wistful late-'30s atmosphere". Alessandra Stanley in the New York Times, also finds the plot thin, while explaining that "The mission in a Furst novel is never as interesting as the men and women who volunteer, or are forced to complete it", and the shady associates with whom they must mix on the way. In this case there is the added interest that its main character, Lieutenant Colonel Mercier de Boutillon, portrayed in the novel as being on the outskirts of the Charles de Gaulle circle, is in fact based on the General. Like him, "Mercier has aristocratic roots, graduated from military school in the class of 1912, spent time in a German prison camp during World War I and helped Polish troops fight the Red Army in 1920." For fellow novelist C. G. Fewston, however, most of the rest of the characters are genre caricatures and the level of writing only comes alive in the light-heartedly skillful sex scenes, spiced with such internal reflections as "Only a princess, he thought, would join a man in the shower but disdain the use of the guest soap".

== Adaptation ==
The book was adapted for television in 2013, with the title Spies of Warsaw, a co-production of TVP1, BBC Four, BBC America, and ARTE, in a series that premiered in January in the United Kingdom and in April in the United States.
