= Parting Shots =

1999 British film by Michael Winner

- Theatrical release poster
- Directed by: Michael Winner
- Screenplay by: Michael Winner; Nick Mead
- Story by: Michael Winner
- Produced by: Michael Winner; John Blezard (assistant producer); Timothy Pitt Miller (assistant producer); Ron Purdie (associate producer)
- Starring: Chris Rea; Felicity Kendal; Bob Hoskins; Ben Kingsley; Joanna Lumley; Oliver Reed; Diana Rigg; John Cleese
- Cinematography: Ousama Rawi
- Edited by: Michael Winner (credited as “Arnold Crust”)
- Music by: Les Reed; Chris Rea
- Production companies: Scimitar Films; Michael Winner Ltd.
- Distributed by: United International Pictures
- Release date: 14 May 1999
- Running time: 99 minutes
- Country: United Kingdom
- Language: English

Parting Shots is a 1999 British dark comedy film starring Chris Rea, Felicity Kendal, Oliver Reed, Bob Hoskins, Diana Rigg, Ben Kingsley, John Cleese and Joanna Lumley. It was the final film directed by Michael Winner.

Upon release in the UK, the film gained controversy over its plot, and was widely criticised in the national press. It has since been evaluated as one of the worst films ever made.

== Plot ==
Photographer Harry Sterndale is diagnosed with stomach cancer and told he has just six weeks to live. Once a successful photographer, Harry was bankrupted by an investment scam pushed on him by his shallow ex-wife Lisa, who promptly left him for another man. After brooding for a few days, the usually mild-mannered Harry becomes set on revenge. With nothing to lose, he obtains a gun from the black market and embarks on a mission to kill all those who have wronged him, starting with Lisa. After the shooting, the police question him, but do not believe he is a killer.

Harry next targets Gerd Layton, the corrupt financier behind the investment scam. Posing as a repair man, he sneaks into Layton's home and drowns him in his own pool. His secretary, Jill, is aware of the murder but covers for Harry since her own parents were a victim of Layton's scam.

Brought together by the crime, Harry and Jill begin a relationship. They visit an upscale restaurant together but are abused and thrown out by the snobbish chef. Later that night, Harry returns to the restaurant and shoots the chef in the car park. The next day Harry decides to hire a hitman, Jamie, to kill him so he can give Jill the resulting life insurance payout. Meanwhile, the police determine the gun used in the killing of the chef was the same one used to kill Lisa. The police raid Harry's house, but with no physical evidence they reluctantly let him go. He borrows from the bank as much money as he can and spends it on lavish hotels and a new car. The last two victims of his killing spree are a bully from his school days and a back-stabbing former boss. Upon returning to London, he passes the gun to Jamie since he no longer needs it.

Harry is subsequently hospitalised by his cancer, but after operating they discover he has been misdiagnosed and his stomach pains were due to a simple ulcer. After the good news, Harry and Jill decide to marry. As they are leaving their hotel, Jamie takes a shot at Harry, however he misses and accidentally kills a foreign head-of-state staying in the same hotel. Jamie is apprehended and since he was using Harry's gun and has no chance of release, he takes responsibility for all of Harry's murders in a last act of charity.

After Harry and Jill marry, they meet Jamie in prison and Harry announces that Jill is pregnant and are going to name their son after him. Jill asks if there is anything they can do in return for taking the blame for the murders, in which he asks if Harry can kill off someone he has been after for ages, but never got round to it. The three engage in laughter before the film ends.

== Cast ==
- Chris Rea as Harry Sterndale
- Felicity Kendal as Jill Saunders
- Oliver Reed as Jamie Campbell-Stewart
- Bob Hoskins as Gerd Layton
- Diana Rigg as Lisa Sterndale
- Ben Kingsley as Renzo Locatelli
- John Cleese as Maurice Walpole
- Joanna Lumley as Freda Armstrong
- Gareth Hunt as Inspector Charles Bass
- Nicholas Gecks as Detective Constable Ray
- Patrick Ryecart as Graham Cleverley
- Peter Davison as John Fraser
- Nicky Henson as Askew
- Caroline Langrishe as Vanessa
- Edward Hardwicke as Dr Phil Joseph
- Nicola Bryant as Beverley
- Brian Poyser as President Zlomov
- Sheila Steafel as President's Wife
- Timothy Carlton as Commissioner Grosvenor
- Roland Curram as Lord Selwyn
- Jenny Logan as Lady Selwyn
- Sarah Parish as Ad Agency Receptionist
- Mildred Shay as Old Lady at Wedding
- Andrew Neil as TV Newsreader

== Production ==
Winner came up with the basic storyline after a relationship of his had ended. Speaking to Tim Sebastian of the BBC in June 1999, Winner revealed: "We all have people we'd like to kill. Sometimes we want to kill them for a long time and sometimes it just lasts the few seconds that they're cutting you up, or being a nuisance. A girlfriend parted very nastily, and I thought 'I really wouldn't mind killing you' and five or six years later I thought, 'I still wouldn't mind.'"

The majority of the cast was chosen personally by Winner, and included friends, those he had worked with professionally before, or other actors/actresses he wished to work with. Early discussions for the lead role suggested Neil Morrissey or Martin Clunes, but when Winner met Chris Rea on a beach at Sandy Lane, Barbados, he was chosen instead.

After filming had come to an end, Winner had told his personal assistant, Dinah May, that Parting Shots was likely to be his last film. Regardless, he had said working with Rea was "a real pleasure" and that he had enjoyed making the film more than any of his past ones.

According to Peter Davison, John Alderton was offered the role of John Fraser. Alderton turned it down because of the violence, and the part went to Davison instead.

== Reception ==
Parting Shots was not well received by critics, with Total Film describing Winner's work as "offensive", "incompetent" and "bad in every possible way". Andrew Collins gave a strongly negative review of the film: "Parting Shots... is going to set the course of British film-making back 20 years. It is not only the worst British film produced in this country since Carry On Emmannuelle (quite a feat in itself), it is a thoroughbred contender for the crown of Worst Film Ever Made". In a hostile overview of Winner's films, Christopher Tookey wrote "Parting Shots is not only the most horrible torture for audiences that Winner has ever devised. It is also profoundly offensive, even by Winner's standards".

Charlotte O'Sullivan, The Independent's film editor, wrote that Parting Shots was "the worst film I've ever seen". O'Sullivan also took issue with the film for glorifying vigilantism: "It's Michael Winner and you know, he doesn't have any sense of irony. He seems to be saying it is okay to go and kill people". The journalist Miles Kington later wrote that despite the film's "glittering cast", it "was possibly the worst film ever made". In its entry on Michael Winner, the book Contemporary British and Irish Film Directors wrote that Parting Shots "makes a bold challenge for the hotly contested mantle of worst British film ever made." British film historian I.Q. Hunter, discussing the question "What is the worst British film ever made?", listed Parting Shots as one of the candidates for that title.

== See also ==
- List of 20th century films considered the worst
- Falling Down
