= Mildred Shay =

American actress

- Born: Mildred Helen Shay; September 26, 1911; Cedarhurst, New York
- Died: October 15, 2005 (aged 94); Glendale, California
- Occupation: Actress
- Years active: 1930s–1999
- Known for: Socialite
- Spouse(s): Thomas Francis Murphy (1934–1935); Winthrop Gardiner (1936–1937); Geoffrey Steele (1941–1987)
- Children: Georgiana

Mildred Shay (September 26, 1911 – October 15, 2005) was an American film actress of the 1930s whose affairs, marriages and glamorous social life became a popular subject for gossip columnists. At five-feet tall, Shay was dubbed the "Pocket Venus" by Hollywood gossip columnists.

== Early life and education ==
Mildred Helen Shay was born on September 26, 1911, in Cedarhurst, New York, the eldest daughter of a wealthy lawyer, Joseph A. Shay, and his wife, Lillian. She attended New York schools and a Swiss finishing school in France until age 14, when her father moved her and her younger sister, Adeline, to London. The family also lived in Florence, Italy, and in Nice, France.

== Career ==
When Shay was 19 years old, the family moved to Hollywood because of her father's work on behalf of various movie studios. She lived with her mother and sister at the Garden of Allah apartments, which was populated by film stars. The family's friends and neighbors included Laurence Olivier, Harpo Marx, Gary Cooper, and Ginger Rogers (the last of whom Shay said was her spa and skinny-dipping partner).

When Shay decided she wanted to be an actress, her father contacted the heads of Fox and Paramount movies studio for their help. Quickly thereafter, she was given her first screen test with Douglas Fairbanks Jr., and then studied acting with Clark Gable's wife, Josephine Dillon. Her first screen roles were small uncredited parts in such films as The Age of Consent (1932), A Bill of Divorcement (1932) starring John Barrymore and Billie Burke, and Roman Scandals (1933) with Eddie Cantor. Shay also dubbed the voice of Greta Garbo in Grand Hotel.

Shay took a break from acting during her first marriages. After the second ended, she acted on Broadway in The Sap Runs High. She then returned to Hollywood in 1939 to play Joan Crawford's French maid in The Women, a "scene-stealing" role. According to Shay (as expressed in interview), Groucho Marx was a friend, and thought she had a gift for comedy, offering to write material for her, but Shay refused because she wanted to be known as a "serious" actress.

Except for the 1948 film I Killed the Count, Shay, after moving to England during World War II, gave up acting for two decades.

In 1968 she returned to acting with a small role in the Julie Andrews film Star!. She appeared in the 1974 remake of The Great Gatsby, and then, in 1976, director Ken Russell asked her to play an "aged American desperate for attention" in Valentino, his biography of Rudolph Valentino; in it, Shay danced with the film's star, Rudolf Nureyev.

Shay continued to act and make small appearances over the next 30 years, including appearances in Candleshoe (1977), Superman III (1983), Death Wish 3 (1985), Little Shop of Horrors (1986), and Bullseye! (1990). According to sources, her last film was Parting Shots (1999).

== Social life ==
Although mostly an ingenue screen actress, Shay became well-publicized for her social life and romances. She was chauffeured around Hollywood in a Mercedes-Benz limousine, to the studios as well as parties and events. Although of diminutive stature, her beauty attracted many admirers, and Walter Winchell dubbed her "Hollywood's Pocket Venus". Shay's dates included Errol Flynn, Howard Hughes, Johnny Weissmuller, Victor Mature, Roy Rogers and Cecil B. DeMille.

In 1934, Shay married Thomas Francis Murphy, described alternatively as an attractive Irishman and as a drunken philanderer who accumulated large debts; the marriage ended within the year. Shay remarried in 1936 to Winthrop Gardiner, a member of a prominent New York family descended from Lion Lord Gardiner. Winthrop Gardiner had also, in that year, inherited the 3,300-acre Gardiners Island off the eastern coast of Long Island—that inheritance deriving from a 1639 grant to the Gardiner family from the English Crown—before his sale of it to another family member in 1937. After six months, Shay filed for divorce in response to Gardiner's much-publicized affair with ice skater Sonja Henie, whom he would later marry.

In 1940, Shay met British army captain Geoffrey Steele; the couple married in 1941, with the tabloids speculating how long the union would last. Shay said, "Most gave it 3 to 6 months. Nobody gave us forty years." The couple remained married until Steel's death in 1987.

During World War II, Shay moved to England with Steele, where she gave birth to a daughter, Georgiana. Over the next few decades she frequented Buckingham Palace, and became a prominent figure in London society circles.

== Final years ==
Shay suffered a stroke in 2004. Her final public appearance was the National Film Theatre's 2004 tribute to her favorite director, George Cukor. Shay died at the age of 94 in California while visiting her daughter, Georgiana Waller, the former wife of musician Gordon Waller.

== Partial filmography ==
- In Old Missouri (1940) - Mme. Chee-Chee
- Ride, Tenderfoot, Ride (1940) - Stewardess
- Valentino (1977) - Old Lady at Maxim's
- Candleshoe (1977) - Mrs. McCress
- Funny Money (1983) - Mrs. Keller
- Death Wish 3 (1985) - Magda, Emil's Wife
- Little Shop of Horrors (1986) - Second Customer
- Bullseye! (1990) - Jolene, Tourist Wife
- Parting Shots (1999) - Old Lady at Wedding
