= Poppy (1982 musical) =

- Original Recording
- Music: Monty Norman
- Lyrics: Peter Nichols
- Book: Peter Nichols
- Basis: The First Opium War
- Productions: 1982 Royal Shakespeare Company; 1983 West End
- Awards: Olivier Award for Best New Musical

Poppy is a 1982 musical comedy play set during the First Opium War. The play takes the form of a pantomime, complete with Dick Whittington (played as a principal boy), a pantomime dame, and two pantomime horses. The book and lyrics were written by Peter Nichols; the composer was Monty Norman. Though there are dark and savage undertones to this fairy tale, in the end, most of the British live happily ever after, and it is the Chinese who learn to know their place.

== Plot ==
The year is 1840. The Emperor of China warns the young Queen Victoria to know her place ("The Emperor's Greeting"). The scene is set, panto-style, in a quaint, cardboard English village, "Dunroamin-on-the-Down", ancestral home of Sir Richard (Dick) Whittington and his widowed mother Lady Dodo.

Dick sets off with his manservant Jack Idle and the men of the village to seek their fortune in London or in the new towns of the Industrial Revolution. Jack is sad to leave his girlfriend, Sally. His horse Randy and her mare Cherry also fancy each other and have to be rebuked for their friskiness ("Whoa, Boy"). Lady Dodo pines for the good old days, but Dick believes the age of gold is yet to come.

Sally, left with her mare, sings of her confusion. She likes Jack but pines for Sir Richard, who is also her legal guardian. Secretly, she and Dodo take off on their own for London.

In the City, Dick encounters Obadiah Upward, an up-and-coming merchant, who explains how their fortunes can be made in distant China from the sale of poppies. Dodo and Sally arrive and they agree to make the journey.

They sail to India, and, in the poppy fields, Dodo tells Upward why she loves him ("Nostalgie de la Boue"). Dick and Jack reflect on British India, the East India Company and the Battle of Plassey in a Kipling-esque ballad ("John Companee").

En route for China aboard one of Upward's opium clippers, Dick persuades Jack and Sally to sample their wares, and they savour a pipe dream of paradise.

The Emperor of China tells Victoria to stop the cultivation of poppies, but she replies that the "Bounty of the Earth" is to be shared by every nation. She leaves him alone to lament his son's addiction to the drug. He sends Commissioner Lin to Canton to stamp out the trade. Here, Lin meets Viceroy Teng and his daughter Yoyo who is confused by Europeans ("They All Look the Same To Us").

Obadiah refuses to be intimidated by Lin's threats and sends Dick up the coast to seek fresh markets. Victoria joins his crew as an interpreter and Christian missionary and is questioned on her religious scruples. She explains there is a blessed trinity of Civilisation, Commerce and Christianity that justifies trade ("Blessed Trinity").

Before they leave, Dodo guesses that Sally loves Dick and tells her he is not only her guardian but also her half-brother.

The Chinese lay siege to the European compound, and the animals have to be slaughtered for food. Jack sings Randy a last lullaby before killing him ("Rock-A-Bye Randy").

In the war that follows, the Chinese are defeated and surrender Hong Kong Island. Dodo and Upward sing of how the British and French soldiers sacked the Imperial Summer Palace in Peking ("Rat-a-Tat-Tat").

== Musical numbers ==
Act One

- "The Emperor's Greeting"
- "Dunroamin-on-the-Down"
- "Whoa, Boy"
- "The Good Old Days"
- "Why Must I?"
- "In These Chambers"
- "If You Want to Make a Killing"
- "Nostalgie de la Boue"
- "John Companee"
- "Poppy"

Act Two

- "China Clipper"
- "The Bounty of the Earth"
- "The Emperor's Lament"
- "China Sequence"
- "They All Look the Same To Us"
- "The Blessed Trinity" (Civilisation, Commerce and Christianity)
- "Sir Richard's Song"
- "Rock-A-Bye Randy"
- "The Dragon Dance"
- "Rat-a-Tat-Tat"
- "Finale"

== Production history ==
Poppy premiered on 25 September 1982 at the Barbican Centre performed by the Royal Shakespeare Company. That year, it won the Society of West End Theatre Award for best new musical. On 14 November 1983, the play was moved to the Adelphi Theatre and ran until 18 February 1984. The show was revived in December 1988 at the now-closed Half Moon Theatre (with Louise Gold as Dick Whittington), in 1997 by student group UKC Dramatics at the Gulbenkian Theatre in Canterbury, in 1998 by the Chelsea Players, and again in March 2005 by the Italia Conti Academy at the Landor Theatre.

A 'script-in-hand' performance was given as part of the Royal Shakespeare Company's 50th Birthday Celebrations on 9 July 2011, directed by Mark Ravenhill, with both Peter Nichols and Monty Norman in the audience.

=== Original cast ===
Tao-Kuan, Emperor of China	Tony Church
Queen Victoria	Jane Carr
Jack Idle, a manservant	Stephen Moore
Randy, his horse	Christopher Hurst and Andrew Thomas James
Sally Forth, a schoolmistress	Julia Hills
Cherry, her mare	Noelyn George and Sara Finch
Lady Dodo, the dowager Lady Whittington	Geoffrey Hutchings
Dick Whittington, the squire	Geraldine Gardner
Obadiah Upward, a London merchant	Bernard Lloyd
Lin Tse-Tsii, Commissioner to Canton	Roger Allam
Teng T'ing Chen, Viceroy of Kwuantung	Brian Poyser
Lord Palmerston	David Whitaker
