= Foyle's War series 1 =

Foyle's War
- Series 1
- No. of episodes: 4

Release
- Original network: ITV
- Original release: October 27 – November 17, 2002

Series chronology
- Next → Series 2

Series 1 of the ITV programme Foyle's War was first broadcast in 2002; comprising four episodes. It is set in Spring/Summer 1940.

== Episodes ==
=== "The German Woman" ===
Writer: Anthony Horowitz	Director: Jeremy Silberston	Airdate: 27 October 2002	Net duration: 99 minutes	Set: May 1940	Viewers: 8.94 million
Guests: Robert Hardy, Rosamund Pike, Benedict Sandiford, Edward Fox, David Horovitch, Joanna Kanska, Andrew Powell, Paul Putner, Tom Chadbon, Neil Conrich, Sam Troughton, James McAvoy, Philip Whitchurch, Dominic Mafham
The series begins in May 1940, a time when local Germans are being interned, the bombing of England has commenced, and anti-German feelings are running high. Detective Chief Superintendent Christopher Foyle's request for a service transfer is again denied, and he returns to local police work in Hastings. He is assigned a driver named Sam Stewart — who, to his surprise, turns out to be a young woman from the Mechanised Transport Corps. Foyle finds corruption (specifically a scheme to keep eligible men from being drafted into military service) and other forms of collusion taking place. Foyle investigates the vicious murder by near-decapitation of local magistrate Henry Beaumont's wife, who is a Sudeten German. Much of the case centres on a local pub, and the case ends with the arrest of a cryptographer at the Admiralty, who was in a clandestine relationship with the dead woman. During this time Foyle also often visits Paul Milner, a former policeman whose lower left leg was amputated during his army service in the Norwegian campaign. Foyle encourages him to return to his post as Foyle's sergeant.

==== Background and production ====
The episode is set shortly after the German invasion of Norway and Denmark. Squerryes Court, Westerham, Kent is used as the grand home of Henry Beaumont (Robert Hardy) and his family. Filmed: Summer 2001

=== "The White Feather" ===
Writer: Anthony Horowitz	Director: Jeremy Silberston	Airdate: 3 November 2002	Net duration: 97 minutes	Set: May/June 1940	Viewers: 7.90 million
Guests: Charles Dance, Maggie Steed, Paul Brooke, Bernard Kay, Patrick Godfrey, Ian Hogg, Michael Simkins, Mali Harries, Lisa Ellis, Tobias Menzies, Andres Williams
Set against the backdrop of the Allies' defeat in Belgium and northern France and their evacuation from Dunkirk, invasion and defeat seem imminent. Milner, while visiting London, meets Guy Spencer, a charismatic fascist sympathiser, politician and conman, and is invited inside to observe a meeting. Outside a passer-by who voices distaste at the meeting is badly beaten. Meanwhile, investigations into a minor sabotage case leads Foyle to a local hotel, The White Feather. Milner is frustrated by the coolness of his wife, who struggles to cope with his amputation, leaving him conflicted between his duties and his personal responsibilities. Later, Spencer leads a private meeting of the fascist "Friday Club" at the same hotel, during which the hotel manageress is shot dead. Foyle and Milner investigate, and chase up numerous leads, including the fisherman-boyfriend of the saboteur, a missing letter from the Foreign Office, an army intelligence agent, and a shop-owner whose gun (the murder weapon) was taken from his hotel room. The husband, who longed to be free of his wife's domination is finally revealed as her killer.

==== Cast and characters ====
Maggie Steed plays Margaret Ellis. This episode shows Milner starting to work as a detective sergeant. He has recently been fitted with an artificial leg and still requires two crutches to walk. His wife, Jane, expresses a great dislike for his prosthetic. Stewart tells Foyle that her father is a vicar; he appears in the episode "Eagle Day". Stewart is very pleased to be invited by Foyle to tea at the Crescent and eats more than her share of the food ordered, including the last lemon curd. Her interest in and healthy appetite for food appears in other episodes. Foyle receives a letter from his son Andrew (a voice-over by the uncredited Julian Ovenden), who writes about his pilot training in the Royal Air Force (RAF) and eating haggis (to hint at his location). "Woolton" is the name Robert Wolf assumes when staying at the White Feather. However, that is the name used in the credits for the character and his nephew Isaac, even though Isaac never used the pseudonym.

==== Background and production ====
This episode is set in the days leading up to the Battle of Dunkirk. The characters discuss the fall of Brussels and the German advance. The characters attend church for the National Day of Prayer on 26 May 1940 as the situation worsens. The episode ends with the Anglo-French evacuation of Dunkirk. One of the plot devices rests on a letter stolen from the Foreign Office; it purports to be from Lord Halifax, well known for his desire for appeasement or negotiated peace. The story also involves a (fictional) political organisation, the "Friday Club", which one of the characters likens to the (historical) British Union of Fascists. The arrest of the BUF leader Sir Oswald Mosley is also mentioned; this occurred in May 1940, when the BUF was banned. The fascists were known for their antisemitism and their political sympathy with Nazi Germany. The book which Spencer lends to Milner, The Protocols of the Elders of Zion, is a notorious antisemitic forgery. Filmed: April–May 2002

=== "A Lesson in Murder" ===
Writer: Anthony Horowitz	Director: David Thacker	Airdate: 10 November 2002	Net duration: 97 minutes	Set: June 1940	Viewers: 9.07 million
Guests: Allan Corduner, Oliver Ford Davies, Danny Dyer, Ian Puleston-Davies, Sophia Myles, David Tennant, Cheryl Campbell, John Shrapnel, Tony Maudsley, Mali Harries, Nicholas Audsley, Madeleine Worrall, Gregg Prentice, Elliot Cowan
A conscientious objector, David Beale, loses his tribunal appeal and is later found dead in his jail cell. At the house of Lawrence Gascoigne, the judge who sentenced him, Joe Cooper – an observant 11-year-old boy who was evacuated from London and is struggling to cope with his new surroundings – is killed by a hand grenade booby trap in the summerhouse. Foyle's investigation reveals a relationship between the judge's daughter, Susan, and a local worker, Peter Buckingham. Foyle also becomes suspicious of the actual purpose of the mysterious factory at which Buckingham works. Later, while guarding the house, Milner is caught in an apparently compromising position with Susan and is asked to leave. Shortly thereafter, the judge is found shot dead inside a room with locked windows. Foyle's investigations centre on the gun used and finally on the judge's wife, Emily, who was appalled by her husband's treatment of Joe.

==== Cast and characters ====
Milner is limping and uses one walking stick; it appears he is becoming accustomed to his false leg. However, his wife, Jane, continues to be upset by it. She leaves him to stay with her sister Kate in Wales. The episode reveals Foyle's long-standing friendship with Carlo Lucciano, an Italian restaurant owner in Hastings, which dates back to when Foyle's wife was alive. Foyle mentions that his son Andrew training as a pilot with the RAF in Scotland. Tony Lucciano asks Stewart to be "his girl" and write to him while he is serving. She appears reluctant but finally agrees. There is no reference to Tony after this episode. The boy Joe (Greg Prentice) and his father Eric (Ian Puleston-Davies) are identified by the surname "Pearson" during the episode, but are credited as "Cooper".

==== Background and production ====
The plot centres on an 11-year-old boy who was evacuated from London. In the months leading up to the war, 1.5 million people were moved: 827,000 children of school age; 524,000 mothers and young children (under five); 13,000 pregnant women; 7,000 disabled persons; and over 103,000 teachers and other "helpers". However, as a coastal town, Hastings was preparing for invasion, and in June 1940, vulnerable civilians were evacuated from southern and eastern coastal areas of Britain. At the end of the episode, it is heard that Italy has declared war on Britain and France, which occurred on 10 June 1940. Horsted Keynes railway station on the historic Bluebell Railway doubled for Hastings railway station. Filmed: May–June 2002

=== "Eagle Day" ===
Writer: Anthony Horowitz	Director: Jeremy Silberston	Airdate: 17 November 2002	Net duration: 98 minutes	Set: August 1940	Viewers: 10.04 million
Guests: Hugh Lloyd, Anthony Calf, Stephen Moore, Naomi Frederick, Roger Allam, Anton Lesser, Katy Brittain, Geoffrey Hutchings, Julian Ovenden, Jamie Parker, Tom Bowles
With air-raids becoming more common, Graham Davies, a local lorry driver is found murdered inside a bombed-out house, a gold locket in his hand. Foyle's son Andrew returns from RAF training and is posted to a local station as a test pilot for their secret radar systems, but his time there is troubled. Stewart's father, Reverend Iain Stewart, tries to take her back home, away from the apparently dangerous influences of life as a woman in uniform. After visiting the Whittington Gallery in London, Foyle wonders whether artworks carried to Wales by Davies are all that they seem and, by chance, is helped when Iain identifies a valuable French statuette. Andrew's queries about the atmosphere at the station and subsequent arrest bring the two cases to a head, as Foyle's investigations reveal the reason – the sexual assault, pregnancy, and suicide of Lucy Smith, a Women's Auxiliary Air Force (WAAF); the ensuing cover up (under the guise of the Official Secrets Act) and revenge by Harold Smith, her father.

==== Cast and characters ====
Andrew Foyle is assigned to fly low-altitude missions in a brand-new Supermarine Spitfire, to help calibrate the new British technology of RDF (radar) and finds himself embroiled in the cover-up of a scandal. During the investigation, it is revealed that Andrew had become a nominal member of the British Communist Party in 1938, while attending Oxford, in reaction to the events of the Spanish Civil War. Milner now walks without a cane but still has a noticeable limp. It is revealed that Foyle's wife died "eight years ago", sometime around 1932. He also tells his son about his volunteering for service in the first war, serving in France for three years, being promoted and that he had killed people.

==== Background and production ====
Eagle Day, or Adlertag in German, refers to 13 August 1940, the first day of Unternehmen Adlerangriff (Operation Eagle Attack), when the Germans attacked radar stations in Britain. In this episode, it is represented when a bomb hits the radar station while Foyle was walking outside.

The Spitfire used in the episode is the 1943-built Spitfire LF Mk.IXb MH434, owned and operated by The Old Flying Machine Company. The scenes where Andrew Foyle flies under a bridge on his first 'mission' were reused from the 1988 TV series Piece of Cake (flown by Ray Hanna in MH434). Filmed: June–July 2002

== International broadcast ==
The series was broadcast in Australia on ABC weekly from 8 November 2002, in the United States on PBS on Masterpiece Theatre on 2, 9, 16 and 23 February 2003 as Foyle's War I, and on Netflix as of April 2014.
