= Radosław Kaim =

Polish actor (born 1973)

- Born: 7 October 1973 (age 52)
- Occupation: Actor
- Years active: 1999–present
- Website: http://www.radkaim.com/

Radosław Sebastian Kaim (born 7 October 1973) is a Polish actor.

== Filmography ==
- 2000: Egoiści
- 2002: Jak to się robi z dziewczynami
- 2003: Show
- 2007: It's a Free World...
- 2008: Doctor Who (episode "The Sontaran Stratagem")
- 2010: Patagonia
- 2011: Waterloo Road
- 2011: Wild Bill
- 2013: Spies of Warsaw
- 2015: Capital
- 2019: Silent Witness
- 2022: A Spy Among Friends
- 2022: Andrey Lugovoy in Litvinenko
- 2026: Großstadtrevier (episode "Offene Rechnung")
