= Christopher Good =

English retired actor

- Occupation: Actor
- Years active: c. 1969–2010

Christopher Good is an English retired actor best known for his work on television.

In the 1970s he made a stage appearance in a musical version of Jeeves and Wooster. In the 1990s he was, according to the Times, one of the most energetic Falstaffs ever.

Good has made many one-off or short-lived appearances in drama and comedy programmes, with Murder Most Horrid, Rumpole of the Bailey, Danger UXB, The Choir and Pie in the Sky being among them. He appeared in The Beast Below, an episode of the 2010 series of Doctor Who.

He is arguably best known for his role as Quentin Kirrin in the 1990s television adaptation of The Famous Five, Enid Blyton novels in which he appeared in eighteen episodes.

In retirement he has restored an old mill and created a large garden in Herefordshire.

== Selected TV and filmography ==
- Budgie (1972) – 1st Constable / Factory Gateman
- Six Days of Justice (1973) – Mr. Barrington-Smith
- Upstairs, Downstairs (1974) – Captain Philip Hanning
- A Bridge Too Far (1977) – Major Carlyle
- Julius Caesar (1978) – Clitus
- Casting the Runes (1979) - John Harrington
- Danger UXB (1979) – Captain West / Major
- Juliet Bravo (1980) – Tony Woodward
- Secret Army – "The Last Run" (1979) – Flight Sergeant Tucker
- Brideshead Revisited (1981) – Collins
- Victor/Victoria (1982) – Stage Manager
- Gandhi (1982) – Young Englishman
- Bullshot (1983) – Lord Binky Brancaster
- Diana (1984) – Alistair
- Miss Marple – "The Murder at the Vicarage" and "The Mirror Crack'd From Side To Side" (1986, 1992) – Christopher Hawes
- Murder Most Horrid (1991) – Leonard
- The Famous Five (1995–1997) – Quentin
- Possession (2002) – Crabb-Robinson
- Dr Jekyll and Mr Hyde (2002) – Dr Brown
- Midsomer Murders (2003) – Simon Smythe-Webster
- The Trial of the King Killers (2005) – Sir Purbeck Temple
- Egypt (2005) – Thomas Young
- Rosemary & Thyme (2006) – The Dean
- Famous 5: On the Case (2008)
- Doctor Who, episode "The Beast Below" (2010) – Morgan
