= Foyle's War series 8 =

Foyle's War
- Series 8
- No. of episodes: 3

Release
- Original network: ITV
- Original release: January 4 – January 18, 2015

Series chronology
- ← Previous; Series 7

Series 8 of the ITV programme Foyle's War, comprising three episodes, aired in January 2015. Though most episodes were broadcast at 8 pm on ITV, the final one was transmitted at 9 pm.

== Episodes ==
=== "High Castle" ===
Writer: Anthony Horowitz	Director: Stuart Orme	Airdate: 4 January 2015 (UK)	Net duration: 88 minutes	Set: October 1946	Viewers: 6.16 million
Guests: John Mahoney, Nigel Lindsay, Jaime Winstone, Vincenzo Nicoli, Hermione Gulliford, Joseph Drake, Amanda Lawrence
As the Nuremberg trials begin wrapping up, a prominent translator at the trials, professor William Knowles from University College London (UCL), is found murdered in Hyde Park. Foyle is brought in to investigate when the address of Clayton Del Mar, a prominent American oil tycoon, is found on the body. It is clear to Foyle that political, business and intelligence machinations are at play. Hermann Linz, a German businessman on trial in Nuremberg for whom Knowles served as translator, is found murdered in his high-security cell. Foyle investigates Linz's IG Farben office at the Monowitz concentration camp and finds clues pointing to a connection between Linz and Global American Oil, Del Mar's company. Further evidence reveals the company’s illegal export in 1940 of tetraethyllead (disguised in barrels labelled “High Castle Whisky”) from the UK via Tenerife in the neutral Spanish Canary Islands to Germany for use by the Luftwaffe. Meanwhile, Soviet government agents, now fearful of post-war American interference in the oil politics of Iran, assassinate Del Mar to prevent him from influencing the current negotiations.

==== Cast and characters ====
Adam Wainwright is forced, on two fronts, to address the issue of women who went to work during wartime and who do not want to give up their jobs postwar. One of his constituents doesn't want to be demoted in order to accommodate a returning soldier whose job she had filled competently in his absence. Meanwhile at home, the Wainwrights struggle over his desire for Sam to quit her job to become a stay-at-home mother. While Foyle investigates the deaths of Knowles and Linz, Sam decides to volunteer for a risky undercover job to find a "Friends of Himmler" photograph, removed by Knowles from the university archive, that incriminates Del Mar’s father by revealing his connection with the Nazis during the war. Unaware that Sam is pregnant, Foyle agrees. He also seems to strike up a mutual intellectual appreciation with Dr. Elizabeth Addis, a colleague of Knowles at UCL.

==== Background and production ====
The story is set shortly after the Nuremberg trials, which ended on 1 October 1946. Linz and others like him had been put on trial because during WWII his firm, IG Farben, had hired Monowitz Concentration Camp inmates from the SS as cheap labourers, which was a form of war profiteering. Del Mar and his father, who own Global American Oil, are revealed to have also been war profiteers who should have been tried during the Nuremberg trials, as were Linz and Strasser from the previous episode. However, MI5 had a history of looking the other way and protecting influential people like Del Mar. In his case, the British government was counting on him using his influence to help the UK build a business relationship with the Shah of Iran to help the UK compete successfully against the Soviet Union for favourable oil deals in the Middle East.

=== "Trespass" ===
Writer: Anthony Horowitz	Director: Stuart Orme	Airdate: 11 January 2015 (UK)	Net duration: 87 minutes	Set: Nov 1946	Viewers: 5.86 million
Guests: Richard Lintern, Alexander Arnold, Alex Jennings, Finbar Lynch, John Heffernan, Matilda Ziegler, Jonathan Tafler, Michael Begley, Poppy Miller
A young man, Daniel Woolf, the son of Sir David Woolf, a high-profile wealthy Jewish businessman, is assaulted on the grounds of a university, and Foyle begins to wonder if the attack was racially motivated. Tensions are starting to run high in London with a charismatic right-wing leader, Charles Lucas, head of the International Unity Party, agitating anti-immigrant, anti-Slavic, and anti-Semitic sentiments that lead to a riot and fire bombing of a house. It is discovered that “Defenders of Arab Palestine”, which has bombed empty transport ships in France, is fictitious and was set up by Clive Ord-Smith of the Foreign Office to reduce illegal Jewish immigration to Palestine. Ord-Smith's operatives also were behind both the attack on Daniel Woolf and the murder of his father. Foyle helps to uncover and stop a bomb threat to the conference on Palestine in London, a product of the increasing tensions between competing Arab and Jewish interests in the region.

==== Cast and characters ====
Adam Wainwright continues serving as an MP, while Sam Wainwright continues helping Foyle with his work. She also takes interest in a local boy suffering from whooping cough. Foyle briefly resigns after being set up while trying to meet members of an Arab delegation, and it is revealed at the end of the episode that Addis is working for Pierce.

==== Background and production ====
The episode opens with newsreel coverage of the King David Hotel bombing in Jerusalem on 22 July 1946, which acts as a background to later tensions over the Palestine issue in London. References are also made to graffiti depicted symbolising Perish Judah ("PJ"), and a Right Club type of organisation which agitates Londoners in Adam Wainwright's electoral district. The show also references the early stages of the formation of the NHS.

=== "Elise" ===
Writer: Anthony Horowitz	Director: Andy Hay	Airdate: 18 January 2015 (UK)	Net duration: 89 minutes	Set: Jan 1947	Viewers: 5.55 million
Guests: Katherine Press, Emma Fielding, Tony Clay, Leo Gregory, Daniel Peacock, Conleth Hill
Foyle examines Pierce's top-secret role during the war within the Special Operations Executive (SOE) after she is shot outside MI5 by a man saying "This is for Elise". Pierce survives and is visited by an ex-SOE colleague, Sir Ian Woodhead, who is the current director of MI6. Foyle discovers that "Elise" was the codename of Sophie Corrigan, an SOE agent killed in May 1944, and that her brother Miles shot Pierce, blaming her and others for his sister's death behind enemy lines in France. Foyle suspects the shooting may be connected to the hunt for a traitor within SOE, code-named Plato, who may also have been behind the deaths in France of eight other SOE agents, all working under Pierce. Foyle is aided by MI5 agent Elizabeth Addis, who investigated and made a list of those suspected of being Plato. Foyle manages to track down both the top three suspects on Addis’s list, as well as Miles Corrigan. Due to Foyle’s findings, Pierce realises there was no Plato and that Woodhead was to blame for the deaths of Sophie Corrigan and the eight other agents. After confronting Woodhead, Pierce commits murder-suicide in Woodhead's office using a hand-grenade.

==== Cast and characters ====
A major subplot in the show is that of racketeer Damian White, a man who has become wealthy from illegal clubs, bars, dealings in black market goods, and more recently, the sale of state secrets to Russia. Sam Wainwright is faced with a dilemma when her husband Adam is persuaded to crack down on the black market but is arrested when contraband cigarettes are planted in their home. Defending his innocence, she discovers the collusion of police Chief Superintendent Alan Usborne of West Peckham with White. At great risk, she convinces Glenvil Harris, her husband's constituency chair, to accompany her when she follows Usborne to get evidence of his collusion. Photographing them together, she gets them both arrested — White for treason, Usborne for receiving stolen goods — by providing the photos to Foyle. Consequently, her husband is cleared. The series ends with Sam finally telling Foyle she is pregnant — technically PWP (pregnant without permission) as they subtly joke, and her touchingly asking him to be the baby's godfather.

==== Background and production ====
According to letters found in Pierce's apartment, the story takes place a few days after 3 January 1947. Real events which influenced this episode include Operation NordPol, a successful German intelligence operation in Holland in 1942 and 1943. Other ongoing themes include the post-war black marketing in food and other goods, meat substitutions, as well as building material shortages. One scene refers to entertainment at the time, showing a poster for the musical revue Happy and Glorious starring comedian Tommy Trinder.

== International broadcast ==
“Elise” was broadcast in the United States as Foyle's War VIII, on PBS' Masterpiece and on Acorn TV. Series Seven was broadcast in Australia on ABC weekly from 7 February 2015.
