= Ray Hanna =

New Zealand aerobatic pilot (1928–2005)

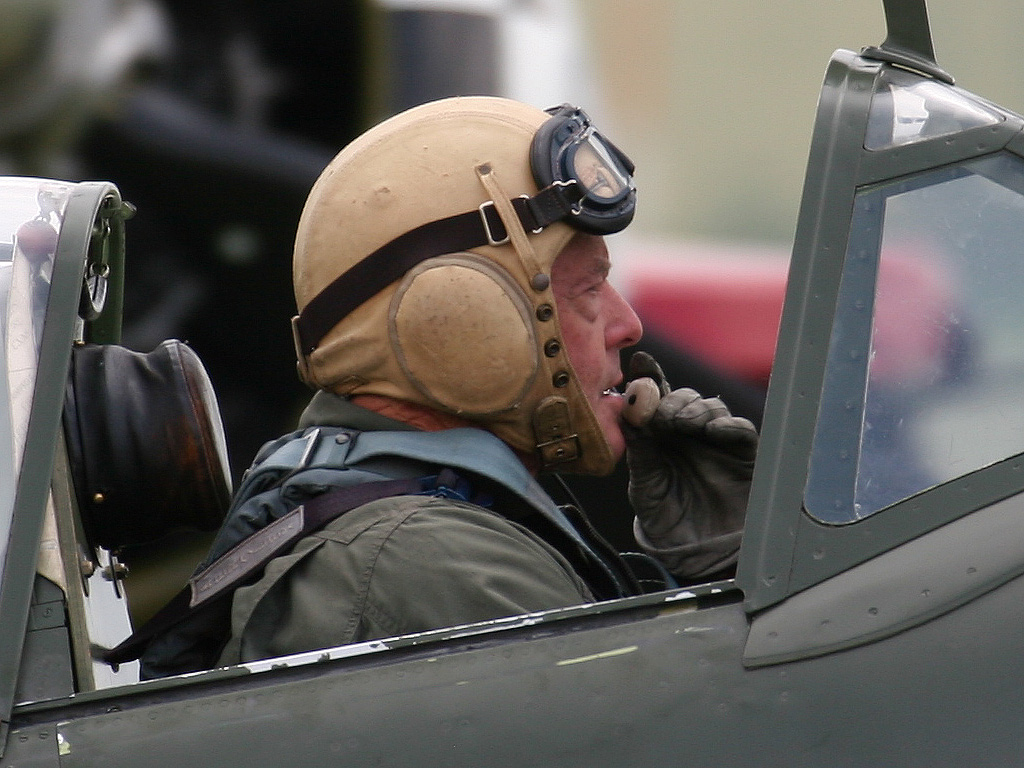
- Hanna in Spitfire MH434 in 2005
- Born: 28 August 1928; Takapuna, Auckland, New Zealand
- Died: 1 December 2005 (aged 77); Switzerland
- Burial place: Parham, Suffolk, United Kingdom
- Military career
- Allegiance: United Kingdom
- Branch: Royal Air Force
- Service years: 1949–1971
- Rank: Squadron Leader
- Commands: Red Arrows
- Awards: Air Force Cross & Bar; Queen's Commendation for Valuable Service in the Air

Raynham George Hanna, AFC & Bar (28 August 1928 – 1 December 2005) was a New Zealand-born fighter pilot who emigrated to England to join the Royal Air Force (RAF). During his RAF career he was a founding member of the Red Arrows aerobatics display team. He also founded The Old Flying Machine Company, which commercially flies Second World War vintage fighter aircraft at air displays around the world, and for television and cinematic productions. He was a Spitfire display pilot in the latter half of the 20th century, noted for his daring aerobatic stunt flying.

== Early life ==
Hanna was born at Takapuna, New Zealand, on 28 August 1928. He received his early formal education at Auckland Grammar School. As a teenager he joined the Air Training Corps in Auckland and learned to fly, receiving his first flying lessons on the Tiger Moth. Opportunities in the Royal New Zealand Air Force were limited, so he looked to the Royal Air Force (RAF) in the United Kingdom for a flying career. In 1949, at the age of 21, he worked his passage on a merchant ship to England, where he applied to join the RAF.

== Royal Air Force career ==
During his initial training with the RAF, Hanna flew planes such as the Percival Prentice, North American Harvard and Gloster Meteor. He went on to fly the Hawker Tempest, Hawker Sea Fury and Bristol Beaufighter.

On 2 May 1951, Cadet Pilot Hanna was awarded a service commission (eight years active duty, and four in reserve) with the rank of pilot officer to date back to 9 May 1949. His first operational posting was to No. 79 Squadron flying the Meteor FR.9 as part of the NATO Second Allied Tactical Air Force. Hanna flew a number of early British jet aircraft in this period, including the de Havilland Vampire, de Havilland Venom, Supermarine Attacker, Hawker Sea Hawk, Supermarine Swift and Gloster Javelin. On 8 February 1955, he was awarded a direct commission (twelve years active and four in reserve) with the rank of flying officer, and was promoted to flight lieutenant on 10 November.

Early in his career, Hanna had the opportunity to become involved with aerial display teams, first as the leader of a four-ship Hawker Hunter display team in 1957 and then, in 1963–64, as a member of a Meteor display team operated by the RAF College of Air Warfare. He was awarded the Queen's Commendation for Valuable Service in the Air in the 1960 New Year Honours, and a year later received his first Air Force Cross.

In 1965, Hanna became a member of the Red Arrows display team as 'Red 3'. The following year, he became the team leader, 'Red 1', a post which he held for a record four years. During this time, Hanna oversaw the enlargement of the team to nine Folland Gnat T.Mk.1 aircraft, making possible the inclusion of the diamond-nine formation which is a staple feature of Red Arrows display routines to this day. During this period, the Red Arrows became a permanent squadron as part of the Central Flying School. Hanna was awarded a permanent commission on 1 October 1966, and as an acting squadron leader was awarded a Bar to his Air Force Cross in the 1967 New Year Honours.

Hanna was promoted to squadron leader on 1 January 1968, and was retired from the RAF at his own request on 14 May 1971.

== Post-RAF flying career ==
Ray Hanna in the cockpit of Spitfire MH434 at Biggin Hill, 2004.

After leaving the RAF, Hanna became a commercial airline pilot flying Boeing 707s for Lloyd International, and subsequently spent seven years with Cathay Pacific, flying 707s and Lockheed Tristars. At the end of the 1970s Hanna was asked by the Chairman of Cathay Pacific, Sir Adrian Swire, to display Swire's Spitfire LFIXb, MH434. This was the beginning of a long association between Hanna and this aircraft that would last until his death.

=== The Old Flying Machine Company ===
In 1981, Hanna and his son Mark (then still a serving RAF fighter pilot) established The Old Flying Machine Company, based at Duxford Aerodrome, to commercially operate and display fly a number of vintage military aircraft. In 1983 Adrian Swire put Spitfire MH434 up for commercial auction, and it was purchased by Hanna and his commercial partners for The Old Flying Machine Company's flying stock. In 1988 Mark resigned from the RAF to join the company full-time. Throughout the 1980s and 1990s the company's aeroplanes performed at flying shows around the world, and opened up a spin-off service providing its aircraft for the filming of cinema and television productions, including Piece of Cake (1988), Empire of the Sun (1987), Memphis Belle (1990), Saving Private Ryan (1998) and Tomorrow Never Dies (1997). Hanna flew his Spitfire under the bridge at Winston, near Barnard Castle, for a scene in Piece of Cake.

A television documentary film, entitled A Spitfire's Story (1995), detailing the history and complete refit of Spitfire MH434 was produced in the mid-1990s. It was broadcast on the Discovery Channel. On 18 July 1996, in a notorious piece of flying as part of the filming for a television series entitled The Air Show, for a programme about the history of the Spitfire, Hanna flew one across the grounds of Duxford Aerodrome at deck level to the rear of Alain de Cadenet presenting, in a prearranged stunt that was a little lower than had been anticipated.

In 1998 at the first meeting of the Goodwood Revival racing car festival, Hanna confounded a trackside crowd, which had been expecting a pass overhead by a Spitfire, by flying it at full throttle on the deck past them across the Goodwood circuit's start/finish line. Hanna flew Spitfire MH434 for a final time before a crowd at the Duxford Autumn Airshow on 16 October 2005.

== Personal life ==
Hanna married Eunice Rigby in 1957, and had two children, Mark and Sarah. On 25 September 1999, Mark, at the age of 40, crashed in a Hispano Aviación HA-1112 "Buchón" during a performance while coming in to land at an airshow in Sabadell, Spain, and died the following day in hospital from the injuries sustained.

== Death ==
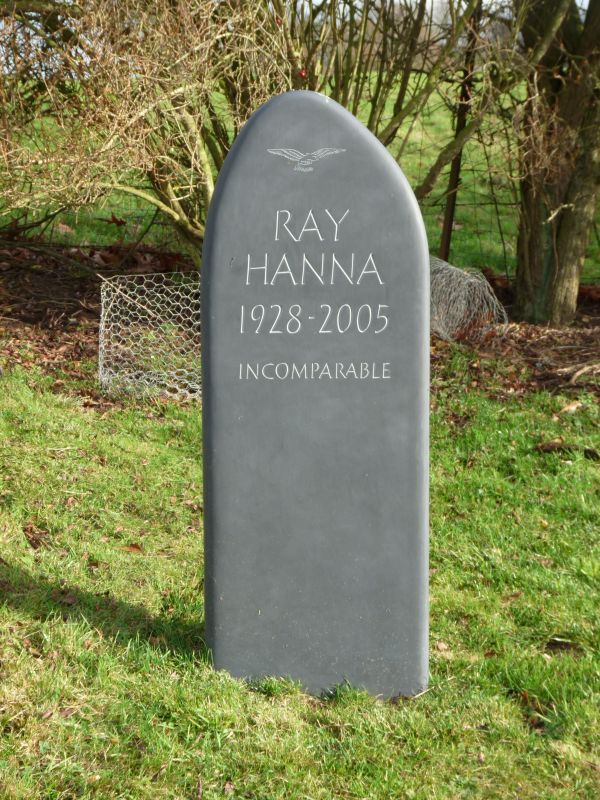
Ray Hanna's grave.

Hanna died in his 78th year in Switzerland of natural causes on 1 December 2005. His body was buried on 15 December in the graveyard of St Mary's Church, to the rear of his family home in the village of Parham's Vicarage, in the County of Suffolk. His grave is next to that of his son, each marked with headstones shaped like an aeroplane propeller blade. During the burial, the Red Arrows staged a low level fly-over salute above the graveyard in the Vic formation.
