= Foyle's War =

British television detective series (2002–2015)

- Genre: Mystery; War drama; Period drama
- Created by: Anthony Horowitz
- Starring: Michael Kitchen; Honeysuckle Weeks; Anthony Howell
- Opening theme: Jim Parker
- Country of origin: United Kingdom
- Original language: English
- No. of series: 8
- No. of episodes: 28

Production
- Executive producer: Jill Green
- Producers: Jill Green; Simon Passmore (2002–2003); Keith Thompson (2004–2006)
- Running time: 86–100 minutes
- Production companies: Greenlit Productions (series 1–6); Eleventh Hour Films (series 7–8)

Original release
- Network: ITV
- Release: 27 October 2002 – 18 January 2015

Foyle's War is a British detective drama television series set during and shortly after the Second World War, created by Midsomer Murders screenwriter and author Anthony Horowitz and commissioned by ITV after the long-running series Inspector Morse ended in 2000. It began broadcasting on ITV in October 2002. ITV director of programmes Simon Shaps cancelled Foyle's War in 2007, but Peter Fincham (Shaps's replacement) revived the programme after good ratings for 2008's fifth series. The final episode was broadcast on 18 January 2015, after eight series.

== Description ==
Detective Chief Superintendent Christopher Foyle (Michael Kitchen), a widower, is quiet, methodical, sagacious, scrupulously honest, and is frequently underestimated by his foes. Many of his cases concern profiteering, the black market and murder, and he is often called on to catch criminals who are taking advantage of the confusion created by the war. Although Foyle often comes up against high-ranking officials in the British military or intelligence services who would prefer that he mind his own business, he seeks justice tenaciously. Throughout the series, he is assisted by his driver, Samantha "Sam" Stewart (Honeysuckle Weeks), and Detective Sergeant Paul Milner (Anthony Howell).

The first six series are set during the Second World War in Hastings, Sussex, England. In series seven, Foyle works, after resigning from the police, for MI5 on Cold War espionage. The stories are largely self-contained. There are some running plot strands, primarily involving the career of Foyle's son Andrew Foyle (Julian Ovenden) – a fighter pilot in the Royal Air Force – or Foyle's relationships with minor characters. Each episode runs for 90 to 100 minutes, filling a two-hour time slot on ITV when commercials are included.

== Production ==
In a newspaper article and an interview accompanying the series one DVD set, Horowitz explained that he was seeking a name which evoked the early 1940s. He thought of Foyles bookshop in London's Charing Cross Road, once known for its archaic business practices and its owner, Christina Foyle; Christopher was the nearest male name to Christina. After Christina Foyle's death, control of Foyles passed in 1999 to her nephew Christopher. Christopher Foyle made a cameo appearance in the episode "Bad Blood", although his scene was cut from PBS airings in the US.

The series is also notable for its attention to historical detail, and the drama is frequently moved along by historical events of the Second World War. Horowitz considered that to honour the veterans of the war it was important to get the details correct. (Note: "Production Notes", Series Four DVD extras.) As the series progressed, he became more interested in the "murder mystery" format than the portrayal of history and exploration of the Home Front. (Note: "Production Notes", Series Five DVD extras.) Nevertheless, the Imperial War Museum is credited in an advisory capacity in some episodes. St Just, in Croft Road, Hastings, was used as the location for Foyle's home.

=== Cancellation and revival ===
After five series, Foyle's War was cancelled abruptly by ITV director of programmes Simon Shaps. This forced Horowitz to discard scripts set during most of 1943 and 1944, resulting in time jumps of nine months to a year between episodes; previous series had gaps of a month at most. In April 2008, the presumed final episode, "All Clear" (during which the end of the war is announced) was broadcast.

On 9 April 2008, however, ITV announced that it was negotiating with Horowitz and Greenlit Productions to revive the series and continue Foyle's adventures beyond VE Day; some media observers saw high viewing figures for the penultimate episode (a 28-percent audience share) on 13 April as strengthening the case for continuing. When the audience figures for the final episode were released (28 percent and an average of 7.3 million viewers), ITV confirmed that it had entered "early discussions" with Horowitz and Greenlit. The negotiations led to Foyle's War's recommissioning for an additional three series. Series six began filming in February 2009 and premiered on UK television on 11 April 2010. Series seven was filmed in Ireland and London from late August to December 2012, and was broadcast in the UK in March and April 2013. Series eight, three two-hour episodes, aired in the UK in January 2015.

=== Foyle's Last Case ===
Even after this second cancellation, Horowitz continued to hold out hope for some sort of revival, spin-off around Honeysuckle Weeks's character, or even just some Christmas specials. An example of the latter concept was even developed by Horowitz as "Foyle's Last Case", an exclusive two-part Christmas short story for the Daily Mail newspaper, published there on the 22 and 23 December 2018.

== Episodes ==
Series	Time	Title	Writer(s)
Series 1; 2002	May – August 1940	1 (1) "The German Woman"	Anthony Horowitz
Series 1; 2002	May – August 1940	2 (2) "The White Feather"	Anthony Horowitz
Series 1; 2002	May – August 1940	3 (3) "A Lesson in Murder"	Anthony Horowitz
Series 1; 2002	May – August 1940	4 (4) "Eagle Day"	Anthony Horowitz
Series 2; 2003	September – October 1940	1 (5) "Fifty Ships"	Anthony Horowitz
Series 2; 2003	September – October 1940	2 (6) "Among the Few"	Anthony Horowitz and Matthew Hall
Series 2; 2003	September – October 1940	3 (7) "War Games"	Anthony Horowitz and Michael Russell
Series 2; 2003	September – October 1940	4 (8) "The Funk Hole"	Anthony Horowitz
Series 3; 2004	February – June 1941	1 (9) "The French Drop"	Anthony Horowitz
Series 3; 2004	February – June 1941	2 (10) "Enemy Fire"	Anthony Horowitz
Series 3; 2004	February – June 1941	3 (11) "They Fought in the Fields"	Rob Heyland
Series 3; 2004	February – June 1941	4 (12) "A War of Nerves"	Anthony Horowitz
Series 4 Part 1; 2006	March – August 1942	1 (13) "Invasion"	Anthony Horowitz
Series 4 Part 1; 2006	March – August 1942	2 (14) "Bad Blood"	Anthony Horowitz
Series 4 Part 2; 2007	December 1942 – March 1943	1 (15) "Bleak Midwinter"	Anthony Horowitz
Series 4 Part 2; 2007	December 1942 – March 1943	2 (16) "Casualties of War"	Anthony Horowitz
Series 5; 2008	April 1944 – May 1945	1 (17) "Plan of Attack"	Anthony Horowitz
Series 5; 2008	April 1944 – May 1945	2 (18) "Broken Souls"	Michael Chaplin
Series 5; 2008	April 1944 – May 1945	3 (19) "All Clear"	Anthony Horowitz
Series 6; 2010	June – August 1945	1 (20) "The Russian House"	Anthony Horowitz
Series 6; 2010	June – August 1945	2 (21) "Killing Time"	David Kane
Series 6; 2010	June – August 1945	3 (22) "The Hide"	Anthony Horowitz
Series 7; 2013	August – September 1946	1 (23) "The Eternity Ring"	Anthony Horowitz
Series 7; 2013	August – September 1946	2 (24) "The Cage"	David Kane
Series 7; 2013	August – September 1946	3 (25) "Sunflower"	Anthony Horowitz
Series 8; 2015	October 1946 – January 1947	1 (26) "High Castle"	Anthony Horowitz
Series 8; 2015	October 1946 – January 1947	2 (27) "Trespass"	Anthony Horowitz
Series 8; 2015	October 1946 – January 1947	3 (28) "Elise"	Anthony Horowitz

Episode numbers in parentheses are a running count used in the following table, "Main Characters".

== Characters and cast ==
=== Main ===
- Michael Kitchen as Detective Chief Superintendent Christopher Foyle (Series 1–8)
- Honeysuckle Weeks as MTC (Mechanised Transport Corps) Driver Samantha Stewart (Series 1–8)
- Anthony Howell as Detective Sergeant, later Detective Inspector, Paul Milner (Series 1–6)

=== Recurring ===
- Julian Ovenden as Squadron Leader Andrew Foyle DFC (Series 1–5)
- Mali Harries as Jane Milner (Series 1–2, 4)
- Michael Simkins as Hugh Reid (Series 1)
- Corin Redgrave as Assistant Chief Constable Rose (Series 2–3)
- Geoffrey Freshwater as Sergeant Eric Rivers (Series 2–3)
- Ellie Haddington as Hilda Pierce (Series 2–3, 5, 7–8)
- Jay Simpson as Sgt Ian Brooke (Series 4–5)
- Max Brown as Adam Wainwright (Series 6)
- Polly Maberly as Edith Milner (Series 6-7)
- Daniel Weyman as Adam Wainwright (Series 7–8)
- Tim McMullan as Arthur Valentine (Series 7–8)
- Rupert Vansittart as Sir Alec Meyerson (Series 7–8)
- Hermione Gulliford as Elizabeth Addis (Series 8)

=== Guest appearances ===
- James McAvoy as Ray Pritchard (Series 1)
- Rosamund Pike as Sarah Beaumont (Series 1)
- Paul Brooke as Arthur Ellis (Series 1)
- Tobias Menzies as Stanley Ellis (Series 1)
- Charles Dance as Guy Spencer (Series 1)
- Danny Dyer as Tony Lucciano (Series 1)
- David Tennant as Theo Howard (Series 1)
- Oliver Ford Davies as Lawrence Gascoigne (Series 1)
- Cheryl Campbell as Emily Gascoigne (Series 1)
- Sophia Myles as Susan Gascoigne (Series 1)
- Elliot Cowan as Peter Buckingham (Series 1)
- Janine Duvitski as Eve Redmond (Series 2)
- Emily Blunt as Lucy Markham (Series 2)
- Laurence Fox as Simon Walker (Series 2)
- Bill Paterson as Patrick Jamieson (Series 3)
- Sandra Voe as Mrs Roecastle (Series 3)
- Samuel West as Lt. Col. James Wintringham (Series 3)
- Peter Capaldi as Raymond Carter (Series 3)
- Philip Jackson as Alan Carter (Series 4)
- Gerard Kearns as Frank Morgan (Series 4)
- Eleanor Bron as Elsa Constantin (Series 6)
- Andrew Scott as James Devereaux (Series 6)
- Kate Duchêne as Helen Fraser (Series 7)
- Jonathan Hyde as Colonel Galt (Series 7)
- Tamzin Outhwaite as Brenda Stevens (Series 7)
- Nick Hendrix as Robert Lucas (Series 8)
- John Mahoney as Andrew Del Mar (Series 8)
- Matilda Ziegler as Lady Ava Woolfe (Series 8)

== International broadcast ==
- Africa - The series began broadcasting in 2009 on the pay service DStv (broadcast from South Africa) on the Universal Channel.
- Australia - Aired on the ABC, with repeats on Seven Network
- Canada - Broadcast in Ontario on TV Ontario and in British Columbia on Knowledge Network
- Denmark - Broadcast on DR1; reruns regularly
- Finland - Broadcast on Yle TV1; series seven and eight broadcast in 2015-2016
- France - Broadcast on Polar+; series one to four broadcast in 2023-2024
- Sweden - Broadcast on TV8, SVT1 and TV4
- Germany - Broadcast on ARD One
- US - Aired on PBS. Series 1-8 are available for streaming on Acorn TV and occasionally on Netflix (the latest run in 2014–2017) via paid subscription. Acorn Media contracted Cre-a-TV to repackage Foyle's War in two-part episodes to run in PBS's time slots. The episodes were fed by satellite to the public television system by PBS affiliate KCET in Los Angeles, and public TV stations began rebroadcasting the series in the fall of 2011. Each episode was aired in two parts, each in a one-hour time slot (usually separated by a week), and each part ran for about 50 minutes.
- Belgium - Canvas
- Netherlands - KRO and BBC NL
- Japan - NHK G

== Awards ==
Foyle's War was nominated in the Best Production Design category for the 2003 BAFTA Television Awards, and won a Lew Grade Award for Best Entertainment Programme that year. The series was nominated for the 2004 BAFTA Best Drama Series award. That year, Honeysuckle Weeks was nominated for the 10th National Television Awards' Most Popular Newcomer award.

== Media ==
=== DVD releases ===
In the UK, the first four series of Foyle's War were released as two two-disc DVDs per series, with two episodes each and episode titles instead of series numbers. In March 2007, UK and US distributor Acorn Media began re-releasing series 1–3 as four-disc DVDs for the UK (as they had in the US) and labelling them with series numbers. A complete box set of the series is available.

DVD series/sets	TV series	Episodes	Originally aired	DVD release		
DVD series/sets	TV series	Episodes	Originally aired	UK (Region 2)	US (Region 1)	Discs
1	1	4	Oct–Nov 2002	2+2 disc release: 10 February 2003; Re-released 7 March 2007	11 March 2003	4
2	2	4	Nov–Dec 2003	2+2 disc release: 9 February 2004; Re-released: 12 March 2007	20 July 2004	4
3	3	4	Oct–Nov 2004	2+2 disc release: 7 March 2005; Re-released: 11 June 2007	1 November 2005	4
4	4	4	Jan 2006 - Apr 2007	2-disc release: 9 October 2006, 16 April 2007; Re-released: 11 June 2007	17 July 2007	4
5	5	3	Jan - Apr 2008	28 April 2008	5 August 2008	3
6	6	3	Apr 2010	26 April 2010	1 June 2010	3
7	7	3	Mar & Apr 2013	15 May 2013	24 September 2013	3
8	8	3	Jan 2015	19 January 2015	14 April 2015	3

=== Blu-ray releases ===
All but the last two series have been released on Blu-ray in Australia (all discs are region-free). While it may appear the "complete collection" box set includes seven seasons, there are only the first six series included. This is due to Icon entertainment releasing parts 1 & 2 of series four as seasons 4 & 5 respectively. Hence after the fourth season the Australian season numbering is one greater than the series that is included in the release.

Blu-ray seasons/sets	TV series	Episodes	Originally aired	Blu-ray release		
Blu-ray seasons/sets	TV series	Episodes	Originally aired	Aus (Region B)	US (Region A)	Discs
1	1	4	Oct–Nov 2002	7 July 2010	n/a	2
2	2	4	Nov–Dec 2003	7 July 2010	n/a	2
3	3	4	Oct–Nov 2004	4 August 2010	n/a	2
4 & 5	4 parts 1 & 2	4	Jan 2006 - Apr 2007	4 August 2010	n/a	2
6	5	3	Jan - Apr 2008	1 September 2010	n/a	2
7	6	3	Apr 2010	1 September 2010	n/a	2
8	7	3	Mar & Apr 2013	n/a	24 September 2013	2
9	8	3	Jan 2015	n/a	14 April 2015	2

=== Other media releases ===
Hastings Borough Council and Rod Green have produced books to accompany the series and these go behind the scenes, as well as celebrate aspects of the series.

- Foyle's Hastings, Hastings Borough Council, 2006, ISBN 978-0901536075
- Foyle's Hastings, Hastings Borough Council, 2006 (updated version), ISBN 0-901536-08-3
- The Real History Behind Foyle's War, Green, R., (2nd Ed.), 2010, ISBN 978-1847325426
