= Jeremy Silberston =

English film director (1950–2006)

- Born: Richard Jeremy Silberston; 1 April 1950
- Died: 9 March 2006 (aged 55)
- Occupation: Film director
- Known for: Foyle's War, Casualty, The Bill
- Spouse: Catherine Napier

Jeremy Silberston (1 April 1950 – 9 March 2006), was an English film director.

== Early life ==
His father was economist Aubrey Silberston, and his mother, Dorothy, was a founder member of the National Schizophrenia Fellowship. He attended The Perse School, Cambridge.

After college, he worked in France on the Disney on Ice show. Returning to England he began to work in television production.

== Career ==
After training at the BBC as a production director in the late 1970s (he was recruited for his ability to speak French) he worked in a range of TV popular drama programmes such as Casualty and The Bill.

In 1979 he was an assistant floor manager on the BBC's Tinker Tailor Soldier Spy. During the 1980s he was production manager of the Nanny Series 1 (1980), Smiley's People (1982), Doctor Who "The Five Doctors" (1983), My Cousin Rachel (mini TV Series) (1983), Bleak House (mini TV Series) (1985), two episodes of EastEnders (1986) and two episodes of Casualty (1988-1989). He became a good friend of writer Anthony Horowitz and they jointly developed Midsomer Murders (1997) and Foyle's War (2002).

He directed episodes of a wide range of TV popular drama including:

- Brookside (1982).
- EastEnders (1988) 1 episode.
- Two episodes of Casualty: "Accidents Happen" (1989) and "Absolution" (1988).
- Episodes of Coasting (1990).
- The House of Eliott (episodes 3, 4, 11 & 12 of series 1; episodes 7 & 8 of series 2, and episodes 9 & 10 of series 3) (1991–93).
- Episodes of Castles (1995).
- 12 episodes of The Bill: "Return to Sender" (1993), "A Tangled Web" (1997); "Vacant Possession" (1998), "High Places", "True Confessions", "Saved", "By the Book", "The Scent of Compassion", "Just For The Crack", "Time to Kill", "On the Wagon", "True Lies", and "Better the Devil".
- 10 episodes of Midsomer Murders: "The Killings at Badger's Drift" (1997), "Written in Blood" (1998), "Death of a Hollow Man" (1998), "Death's Shadow" (1999), "Strangler's Wood" (1999), "Dead Man's Eleven" (1999), "Judgement Day" (2000), "Dark Autumn" (2001), "Birds of Prey" (2003).
- Where the Heart Is (2001) 2 episodes.
- Eight episodes of Foyle's War (2002-2006): "The German Woman", "The White Feather", "Eagle Day", "Among the Few", "The Funk Hole", "They Fought In The Fields", "Enemy Fire" and "Bad Blood".
- The Inspector Lynley Mysteries: The Seed of Cunning (2005).

== Personal life ==
He was married to Catherine Napier, a correspondent for the BBC World Service. He had two sons, Theo and Toby.

== Death ==
He died of a brain tumour after seven months of illness in 2006 aged 55.

Casualties of War, an episode of Foyle's War first broadcast in 2006, was dedicated to his memory.
