= Ellie Haddington =

Scottish actress (b. 1955)

- Born: 17 February 1955 (age 71); Aberdeen, Scotland, UK
- Occupation: Actress
- Years active: 1975–present
- Notable work: Coronation Street; Foyle's War; Life Begins; Bad Girls; The Café; Motherland

Ellie Haddington (born 17 February 1955) is a Scottish actress.

== Early life and education ==
Ellie Haddington was born in Aberdeen, Scotland, on 17 February 1955. She trained as an actor at the Bristol Old Vic Theatre School from 1975 to 1977.

== Career ==
Haddington appeared in 101 episodes of Coronation Street as Josie Clarke from 1995 to 1996. Haddington's other TV credits include Dr Jekyll and Mr Hyde, Life Begins, Foyle's War (as Hilda Pierce), Endeavour, A&E, Cracker, Cutting It, Holby City, Wire in the Blood, Midsomer Murders, The Musketeers, Taggart, Scott & Bailey, Bad Girls, Guilt, New Tricks - and The Bill, in which she played two different roles, in 1997 and 2007. She later appeared as Professor Docherty in the third series finale of Doctor Who, entitled "Last of the Time Lords". In 1997, she played Joan Braithwaite in “Closing Ranks,” the fourth episode of the seventh series of Heartbeat. In 2001 she appeared in Midsomer Murders "Tainted Fruit", as Joan Farley.

Onstage in 2012, she appeared in Bingo at the Chichester Festival Theatre and the Young Vic. In 2011 and 2013, she appeared in the lead role of Carol Porter in the Sky One comedy series The Café. In 2013, she appeared as Madame Dupin in the BBC TV miniseries Spies of Warsaw.

In 2015, Haddington played Gina Corbin in Ordinary Lies and Fanny Biggetywitch in Dickensian. From 2016 to 2022, she played Julia's mother Marion in Motherland.

In 2018, she appeared in Midsomer Murders "Death of the Small Coppers" as Giny Weldon and in Endeavour "Quartet" as Millie Bagshot. In 2019, she played Dr. Moss in the final episode of BBC six-part TV drama by Russell T Davies, Years and Years.

In 2021, she reprised the part of Sheila Gemmell in the BBC black-comedy series Guilt, which was first shown on BBC Two in 2019. She also played Wendy in the Channel 4 miniseries Close to Me. In 2024, she played a guest part in Death in Paradise.

== Filmography ==
=== Film ===
| Year | Title | Role | Director |
|---|---|---|---|
| 1999 | Killing Joe (short film) | Mum | Mehdi Norowzian |
| 2000 | Beautiful Creatures | Maureen | Bill Eagles |
| 2000 | Breathtaking | DCI Matthews | David Green |
| 2001 | Lawless Heart | Judy | Tom Hunsinger, Neil Hunter |
| 2007 | Sparkle | Frances | Tom Hunsinger, Neil Hunter |
| 2009 | Death of a Double Act (short film) | Fox | Christine Entwisle |
| 2009 | Creation | Nanny Brodie | Jon Amiel |
| 2009 | Miss St. Andrews (short film) | Jenny | Claire Grove |
| 2016 | Art in Heaven (short film) | Mrs. Bardell | Elisa Boyd |
| 2016 | Their Finest | Catrin's Landlady | Lone Scherfig |
| 2016 | Fantastic Beasts and Where to Find Them | Mrs. Esposito | David Yates |
| 2020 | Surge | Joyce (Joseph's Mum) | Aneil Karia |
| 2020 | Limbo | Beatrice | Ben Sharrock |
| 2020 | Enola Holmes | Miss Gregory | Harry Bradbeer |
| 2020 | Mairi (short film) | Fiona | Natalie Malla |
| 2021 | Operation Mincemeat | Hilda Georgina Cholmondeley | John Madden |
| 2022 | One Man's Trash (short film) | Dot Evans | Xiao Jiao |
| 2022 | Let's Not Do This Tonight (short film) | Mara | John Jencks |
| 2025 | Revert (short film) | Mum (voice) | Miranda Stern |

=== Television ===
| Year | Title | Role | Notes |
|---|---|---|---|
| 1982 | Muck and Brass | Reporter | Miniseries (guest, 1 episode) |
| 1984 | Coronation Street | Faye Duffield | Soap opera (guest, 3 episodes) |
| 1986 | Unnatural Causes | Woman Interviewee | Series 1 (guest, 1 episode) |
| 1989 | ScreenPlay | WPC | Series 4 (guest, 1 episode) |
| 1990 | Screen Two | Helen | Series 6 (guest, 1 episode) |
| 1994 | Wycliffe | Katherine Geach | Series 1 (guest, 1 episode) |
| 1994 | Cracker | Mrs. Barnes | Series 2 (guest, 2 episodes) |
| 1995 | Kavanagh QC | Diane | Series 1 (guest, 1 episode) |
| 1995–1996 | Coronation Street | Josie Clarke | Soap opera (regular, 101 episodes) |
| 1996 | In Suspicious Circumstances | Evelyn Goslett | Series 5 (guest, 2 episodes) |
| 1997 | Casualty | Lottie McKenzie | Series 11 (guest, 1 episode) |
| 1997 | The Bill | Janet Beadle | Series 13 (guest, 1 episode) |
| 1997 | Heartbeat | Joan Braithwaite | Series 7 (guest, 1 episode) |
| 1997 | Wing and a Prayer | Diana Randall | Series 1 (guest, 1 episode) |
| 1998 | Looking After Jo Jo | May McCann | Series 1 (regular, all 4 episodes) |
| 1999 | Life Support | Fiona Drummond | Series 1 (regular, 5 episodes) |
| 1999 | Bad Blood | Ann Bilton | Television film |
| 2000 | The Wyvern Mystery | Mrs. Tarnley | Miniseries (regular, 2 episodes) |
| 2001 | Taggart | Isabelle Higson | New Year special (guest) |
| 2001 | Midsomer Murders | Joan Farley | Series 4 (guest, 1 episode) |
| 2002 | Dr. Jekyll and Mr. Hyde | Florrie Bradley | Television film |
| 2002 | Cutting It | Lo Ferris | Series 1 (guest, 1 episode) |
| 2002 | Always and Everyone | Carla | Series 4 (guest, 1 episode) |
| 2003 | Sons & Lovers | Mrs. Leivers | Television film |
| 2003–2004 | Holby City | Nina Yorke | Series 6 (recurring, 5 episodes) |
| 2003–2015 | Foyle's War | Hilda Pierce | Series 2–3, 5, 7–8 (recurring, 9 episodes) |
| 2004 | Sea of Souls | Ellen McKay | Series 1 (guest, 2 episodes) |
| 2004–2005 | Life Begins | Kathleen | Series 1–2 (regular, 13 episodes) |
| 2005 | A Very Social Secretary | Pat | Television film |
| 2005–2006 | Bad Girls | Joy Masterton | Series 7–8 (regular, 11 episodes) |
| 2006 | Wire in the Blood | Brenda Douglas | Series 4 (guest, 1 episode) |
| 2007 | The Bill | Lesley Bayliss | Series 23 (guest, 1 episode) |
| 2007 | Doctor Who | Professor Docherty | Series 3 (guest, 1 episode) |
| 2008 | Doctors | Mary Drake | Series 10 (guest, 1 episode) |
| 2008–2009 | New Tricks | Jean Bennett | Series 5–6 (recurring, 2 episodes) |
| 2009 | Gracie! | Jenny Stansfield | Television film |
| 2010 | Mo | Jean | Television film |
| 2010 | Doctors | Bridget Manners | Series 12 (guest, 1 episode) |
| 2010 | Little Crackers | Nellie | Series 1 (guest, 1 episode) |
| 2011 | Holby City | Jeanette Ryan | Series 13 (guest, 1 episode) |
| 2011 | Luther | DCS Linda Carroway | Series 2 (guest, 1 episode) |
| 2011–2013 | The Café | Carol Porter | Series 1–2 (regular, all 13 episodes) |
| 2012 | The Mystery of Edwin Drood | Princess Puffer | Miniseries (regular, 2 episodes) |
| 2013 | Spies of Warsaw | Madame Dupin | Miniseries (recurring, 3 episodes) |
| 2014 | Scott & Bailey | Evie Pritchard | Series 4 (recurring, 2 episodes) |
| 2014 | Atlantis | Enyo | Series 2 (guest, 1 episode) |
| 2015 | The Musketeers | Josette | Series 2 (guest, 1 episode) |
| 2015 | Ordinary Lies | Gina | Series 1 (recurring, 2 episodes) |
| 2015–2016 | Dickensian | Fanny Biggetywitch | Series 1 (recurring, 9 episodes) |
| 2016 | Ripper Street | Agatha Chudleigh | Series 5 (recurring, 5 episodes) |
| 2016–2022 | Motherland | Marion | Series 1–3 (recurring, 14 episodes) |
| 2017 | Casualty | Carole Marshall | Series 32 (guest, 1 episode) |
| 2018 | Endeavour | Millie Bagshot | Series 5 (guest, 1 episode) |
| 2018 | Midsomer Murders | Ginny Welton | Series 20 (guest, 1 episode) |
| 2019 | Years and Years | Dr. Moss | Miniseries (guest, 1 episode) |
| 2019, 2023 | Guilt | Sheila Gemmell | Series 1 & 3 (recurring, 6 episodes) |
| 2021 | Beep | Carol | Television film |
| 2021 | Close to Me | Wendy | Miniseries (recurring, 4 episodes) |
| 2021–2022 | Crime | Avril Lennox | Series 1–2 (recurring, 5 episodes) |
| 2022 | Plebs: Soldiers of Rome | Phaedra | Television film |
| 2023 | The Following Events Are Based on a Pack of Lies | Diane | Series 1 (recurring, 3 episodes) |
| 2024 | Death in Paradise | Barbara Mitchell | Series 13 (guest, 1 episode) |
| 2025 | Silent Witness | Meg McGrath | Series 28 (guest, 2 episodes) |
| 2025 | The Rumour | Liz | Series 1 (recurring, 5 episodes) |
| 2025 | Shetland | Lana Mair | Series 10 (guest, 4 episodes) |
| 2026 | Granite Harbour | Rose Gough | Series 3 (recurring, 3 episodes) |

== Radio ==
| Date | Title | Role | Director | Station |
|---|---|---|---|---|
| 25 November 2007 | Lorca's Rural Trilogy: Blood Wedding | Servant/Mother-in-law | Pauline Harris | BBC Radio 3 Drama on 3 |
| 29 August 2008 | They Have Oak Trees in North Carolina | Eileen | Gaynor Macfarlane | BBC Radio 4 Friday Play |
| 29 October 2008 | Love Contract | Manager | Claire Grove | BBC Radio 4 Afternoon Play |
| 14 December 2011 | The Lamp | Elspeth | Eilidh McCreadie | BBC Radio 4 Afternoon Play |

== Theatre credits ==
| Year | Title | Role | Venue |
|---|---|---|---|
| 1989 | The Duchess of Malfi | The Duchess | Royal Exchange, Manchester |
| 1990 | The Winter's Tale | Paulina | Royal Exchange, Manchester |
| 1990 | My Mother Said I Never Should | Margaret | Chichester Festival Theatre, Chichester |
| 1991 | The Sea | Mafanwy Price | Lyttelton Theatre, London |
| 1992 | Richard III | Duchess of York | Swan Theatre, Stratford-upon-Avon & UK Tour |
| 1993 | Mother Courage and Her Children | Anna Fierling (Mother Courage) | Cottesloe Theatre, London |
| 1994 | Death of a Salesman | Linda Loman | West Yorkshire Playhouse, Leeds |
| 1996 | The House of Bernarda Alba | | Theatr Clwyd, Mold, Flintshire |
| 2000 | Denial | Sandy | Bristol Old Vic, Bristol |
| 2007 | Taking Care of Baby | Lynn Freeman | The Rep, Birmingham & Hampstead Theatre, London |
| 2012 | Bingo | Old Woman | Chichester Festival Theatre, Chichester & Young Vic, London |
| 2016 | Oil | MA Singer | Almeida Theatre, London |
