= List of Gimme Gimme Gimme episodes =

Gimme Gimme Gimme is a British television sitcom, created and written by Jonathan Harvey, and produced by Tiger Aspect Productions, originally for BBC Two for its first two series, and then BBC One in its final series. The series stars Kathy Burke and James Dreyfus, with supporting cast including Beth Goddard, Brian Bovell, and Rosalind Knight.

During the course of the programme, 19 episodes of Gimme Gimme Gimme aired over three series, between 8 January 1999 and 14 December 2001.

== Series overview ==
Series	Episodes	Originally released		
Series	Episodes	First released	Last released	Network
1	6	8 January 1999	12 February 1999	BBC Two
2	7	29 December 1999	18 February 2000	BBC Two
3	6	2 November 2001	14 December 2001	BBC One

== Episodes ==
=== Series 1 (1999) ===
The first series had a copyright year of 1998.

No. overall	No. in series	Title	Directed by	Written by	Original release date	UK viewers (millions)
1	1	"Who's That Boy?"	Liddy Oldroyd	Jonathan Harvey	8 January 1999	6.55
Linda and Tom wake up after a heavy night out to find a mystery man in their kitchen, and both think they brought him home the previous night. It turns out that he is a new neighbour, Jez, and is married to a woman called Suze. He explains this after tricking them into thinking he was an escort.
2	2	"The Big Break"	Liddy Oldroyd	Jonathan Harvey	15 January 1999	6.29
Tom has an audition for Crimewatch; and Linda is certain that a love letter she finds is to her from Jez. Ready for and en route to the audition, Tom slips on an over-buffed hall floor and breaks his leg.
3	3	"Legs and Co."	Liddy Oldroyd	Jonathan Harvey	22 January 1999	5.95
Set right after the previous episode, Tom is in a wheelchair with a broken leg, and his home-help is a suicidal man named Shirley (Morgan Jones). Linda dates a deliveryman, a devoted Christian named Joe.
4	4	"Do They Take Sugar?"	Liddy Oldroyd	Jonathan Harvey	29 January 1999	6.10
Linda's superstar sister, Sharon "Sugar Walls" La Hughes, visits. Linda isn't thrilled to see her at first, but warms up when Sugar agrees to introduce her to Liam Gallagher. In a scene similar to that of the film Notting Hill Tom opens the door to paparazzi and they think he is having an affair with Sugar.
5	5	"Saturday Night Diva"	Liddy Oldroyd	Jonathan Harvey	5 February 1999	5.84
Fearing that he's getting old, Tom goes out clubbing and spends the night with an Italian man, Nino. Linda stays in and tries to seduce Jez while Suze is out at a women's meeting. The next morning Tom finds out that "Nino" is actually "Kevin from Manchester".
6	6	"I Do, I Do, I Do"	Liddy Oldroyd	Jonathan Harvey	12 February 1999	5.35
Tom marries an American lesbian, Gloria, so she can stay in the UK with her girlfriend, India. Linda is appalled at this development until she meets Gloria's brother, Vince.

=== Series 2 (1999–2000) ===
No. overall	No. in series	Title	Directed by	Written by	Original release date	UK viewers (millions)
Special
7	S	"Millennium"	Liddy Oldroyd	Jonathan Harvey	29 December 1999	3.98
Tom and Linda dream of their ideal millennium parties, but end up getting drunk and staying in together.
Series
8	1	"Teacher's Pet"	Liddy Oldroyd	Jonathan Harvey	14 January 2000	6.79
Sugar Walls returns and Tom tries to teach her to act for her upcoming theatre debut. Linda babysits Jez and Suze's virtual baby doll.
9	2	"Stiff"	Liddy Oldroyd	Jonathan Harvey	21 January 2000	5.42
Tom and Linda return home to find what appears to be Beryl's body in a coffin in their living room. They try to cover up her death so they will not be homeless. When Beryl's young boyfriend arrives, both Linda and Tom try to seduce him.
10	3	"Prison Visitor"	Liddy Oldroyd	Jonathan Harvey	28 January 2000	5.57
Linda starts writing to a convicted serial killer in prison, and Tom trains a cat to act on television. The killer then comes to take Linda to Spain, but becomes attracted to Tom.
11	4	"Dirty 30"	Liddy Oldroyd	Jonathan Harvey	4 February 2000	6.16
Tom's prudish parents visit for his 30th birthday. He tries to get rid of them by getting Linda to seduce his dad, but later finds out that his parents are swingers.
12	5	"Glad to be Gay?"	Liddy Oldroyd	Jonathan Harvey	11 February 2000	4.72
After another wild night of clubbing, Tom wakes up with a weird security guard and Linda wakes up with a female cabbie. From then on Linda desperately tries to prove she isn't gay or bisexual.
13	6	"Sofa Man"	Liddy Oldroyd	Jonathan Harvey	18 February 2000	7.10
Tom gets a job in a World of Sofas commercial with smarmy actor Rick Cheesecloth. Linda gets a job working on a production line in a factory, where she fancies her co-worker Ron.

=== Comic Relief special (2001) ===
Title	Original release date
"Comic Relief"	16 March 2001
A short sketch for Comic Relief, Tom and Linda open up a kissing booth in a church, featuring Anna Nolan as a nun.

=== Series 3 (2001) ===
No. overall	No. in series	Title	Directed by	Written by	Original release date	UK viewers (millions)
14	1	"Down and Out"	Tristram Shapeero	Jonathan Harvey	2 November 2001	6.79
Linda opens the garden as a campsite and Miss Twitch (Ann Mitchell), her ex-screw from Borstal, moves in; Tom writes a new drama to star in alongside his idol, Simon Shepherd.
15	2	"Lollipop Man"	Tristram Shapeero	Jonathan Harvey	9 November 2001	< 6.15
Preparing for a walk-on part in a play, Tom gets drunk in his dressing room with Linda and ruins the whole production. Jez, Suze, and Beryl do not appear in this episode
16	3	"Secrets and Flies"	Tristram Shapeero	Jonathan Harvey	23 November 2001	< 5.83
Linda's long-lost son Zippy arrives in search of his mother; Suze gives birth in Tom and Linda's flat.
17	4	"Trauma"	Tristram Shapeero	Jonathan Harvey	30 November 2001	< 5.96
Linda is in hospital; after falling off a bus into a shop window, she has a saucepan stuck on her head. Meanwhile, Tom stars in daytime soap opera Doctor Deaf.
18	5	"Singing in the Drain"	Tristram Shapeero	Jonathan Harvey	7 December 2001	< 5.92
Tom hires a singing teacher, Heidi Honeycomb (Su Pollard), for a role in a musical. Suze has a new job as a modelling agent and hires Linda for a fashion show. Beryl does not appear in this episode.
19	6	"Decoy"	Tristram Shapeero	Jonathan Harvey	14 December 2001	< 5.55
Tom lands a role in Crossroads, and prepares to move out. Linda fakes a terminal illness to try to stop him leaving. Series finale
