= Double Time =

Double time is a musical metre, also known as half-time.

Double Time, Doubletime and variations may refer to:

== Entertainment ==
- Double-Time Records, a record label
- Double Time (TV drama), a British one-off comedy drama starring James Dreyfus
- Double Time (Béla Fleck album), 1984
- Double Time (Leon Redbone album), 1976
- "Double Time" (Only Murders in the Building), a 2021 episode of the TV series Only Murders in the Building
- Doubletime, a 2007 documentary film about rope skipping

== Other ==
- Double time, a rate of pay during overtime
- Doubletime (gene)
- Double time, a marching pace in the military
