= Ellington (TV series) =

- Genre: Crime drama Thriller
- Created by: Gordon Flemyng
- Written by: Various
- Directed by: Gordon Flemyng; Tim Dowd; Roger Gartland; Brian Parker
- Starring: Chris Ellison; Sean Chapman; Maureen O'Farrell; Perry Fenwick; Beth Goddard; Joanna Dolan
- Composer: John Altman
- Country of origin: United Kingdom
- Original language: English
- No. of series: 1
- No. of episodes: 8

Production
- Executive producer: Keith Richardson
- Producers: Emma Hayter; Gordon Flemyng; Lesley McNeil
- Production locations: London, England, UK
- Cinematography: Colin Munn
- Editors: Philip Kloss; Hugo Middleton
- Running time: 50—75 minutes
- Production company: Yorkshire Television

Original release
- Network: ITV
- Release: 26 October 1994 – 23 May 1996

Ellington is a British television crime thriller-sports based drama series was produced by Yorkshire Television, created by Gordon Flemyng, and principally produced by the latter, which was first broadcast on ITV on 26 October 1994.

Later commissioned into a seven-part series between 11 April and 23 May 1996, Ellington follows the exploit of a London-based personal boxing trainer and promoter, the titular character, played by Chris Ellison.

Despite attracting moderate ratings, only eight episodes (including the pilot) were produced; subsequently, the ITV decided against recommissioning the show for a second series. Since initial broadcast, the series has not been repeated or released on any form of home media.

== Cast ==
- Chris Ellison as Ellington
- Sean Chapman as Ben Ellington
- Maureen O'Farrell as Mary Pitt
- Perry Fenwick as Vinnie Done
- Beth Goddard as Kelly Logan
- Joanna Dolan as Belle

=== Series overview ===
Series	Episodes	Originally released	
Series	Episodes	First released	Last released
Pilot	1	26 October 1994	
1	7	11 April 1996	23 May 1996

== Episodes ==
=== Pilot (1994) ===
Title	Directed by	Written by	Original release date
"Ellington"	Gordon Flemyng	Derek Lister & Don Webb	26 October 1994
Rising sports promoter and personal manager, Ellington (Chris Ellison), maintains his integrity and sense of fair play as he battles his way through the corruption that surrounds him in the world of international sport. Conned by an investment banker, he teams up with his solicitor brother (Sean Chapman) to take action.

=== Series 1 (1996) ===
No.	Title	Directed by	Written by	Original release date
1	"Man of Honour"	Gordon Flemyng	Alan Clews	11 April 1996
Ellington's most promising young driver, Eddie Gilmour, is offered a contract with a prestigious Formula One racing team, Falconni. However, at the last minute, he backs out of the deal and disappears, and Eddie's career is in jeopardy. Ellington's arch rival tries to recruit him for his organisation. Meanwhile, Ellington hands the affairs of his first and most loyal client, darts player Sam Weir, to his brother, Ben.
2	"Deuce"	Tim Dowd	Kevin Clarke	18 April 1996
Ellington holds a press conference to announce the signing of junior tennis star, Sarah Kemp. However, the atmosphere turns sour when Sarah receives a package containing live snakes, and her father reveals that this is the latest in a series of threats. Sarah is given a minder, but an intruder manages to enter her house and sabotage her tennis racquets. Her rival is found badly beaten, and her brother is suspected, having been spotted with rival agent Kelly Logan. Meanwhile, Ellington's girlfriend Angie invites him to watch her sing at a jazz club.
3	"No Such Thing as a Draw"	Roger Gartland	Julie Welch	25 April 1996
When Russian footballer Alex Subarov's contract is due for renewal, Ellington is hired to negotiate terms, but team manager Jim Coulter - whose daughter Colette is engaged to Subarov, is anxious to keep details of the contract under wraps. Ellington suspects that Coulter is using Alex for his own purposes, perhaps he is planning a career move and needs a star player to close the deal. Meanwhile, Ben and Vinnie look for Ellington's champion runner, Adam Marley, who goes missing when the Sports Council instruct him to take a drugs test.
4	"On the Nail"	Brian Parker	Alan Clews	2 May 1996
Boxer and ex-client of Ellington, Tommy Knight, has signed with unscrupulous agent Liam Shaw, but now wants to be released from his contract. Believing Tommy has the potential to be a world champion boxer, Ellington offers to do a deal with Shaw. At first, Shaw refuses, then he offers Ellington a sporting chance - a game of snooker and the winner gets the deal. Meanwhile, Kelly comes to Ben's rescue when he misses an important press conference, and Ellington's assistant Mary receives a proposal of marriage.
5	"Getting Rid"	Tim Dowd	Stan Hey & Andrew Nickolds	9 May 1996
The Ellington Enterprises team sets off for a day at the races as new client, jockey Paul Russell, rides his big race. Paul's friend, footballer Bradley Stokes, who is also a client of Ellington, is invited to join them, but unbeknown to Ellington he has a serious gambling problem, and owes money. Meanwhile, Angie arrives at the office expecting lunch and is furious to find that Ellington has stood her up. In a fit of revenge, she encourages the defection of Ellington's champion snooker player to rival agent Kelly Logan.
6	"No Holds Barred"	Roger Gartland	Michael Baker	16 May 1996
Feeling undervalued by the Ellington office, Ben teams up with acquaintance Charlie Pope to promote a pop concert in Rotterdam. The concert sells out, but disaster strikes at the end of the evening when Pope disappears and Ben ends up in jail. Ellington cannot afford to help his brother, but his arch rival Worldwide Management make an offer.
7	"Matchmaker"	Tim Dowd	Alan Clews	23 May 1996
Ellington holds a press conference to announce that boxer Tommy Knight is to fight for a World Title in America. Accusations of match rigging against the Ellington brothers soon fill the headlines, and investigations by the Boxing Board of Control put the fight in jeopardy. Meanwhile, two of Ellington's clients prepare for their weddings.

== Production ==
The series was shot on location in London in the summer of 1994.
