= Geraldine McNulty =

English stage and television actress

- Years active: 1985–present

Geraldine McNulty is an English stage and television actress.

McNulty has played the character of Mrs Raven in My Hero and has had guest appearances in Neverwhere, Gimme Gimme Gimme, The Vicar of Dibley, The Smoking Room and The Catherine Tate Show. Radio work includes guesting on Parsons and Naylor's Pull-Out Sections and The Party Line. She also appeared in French & Saunders' Titanic in 1998 as an extra. She also appeared in Summerhill as Zoe Readhead.

McNulty played a one-woman show at Edinburgh Fringe in 1995, 10 Women In One Frock Show and then developed one of the ten characters, Betty, into a one-woman musical. The following year she starred in the musical Betty, again a solo show, in London's West End. Betty was written by Karen McLachlan and directed by Kathy Burke.

McNulty is best friends with frequent collaborator Dawn French.

Comedian Craig Hill has talked about how seeing McNulty's play 10 Women In One Frock Show at the Edinburgh Fringe in 1995 changed his life, making him switch from acting to comedy. He said "I don’t think I’d ever seen a show that made me want to be in it more. At the time I was an actor and not even thinking about doing stand-up but I was completely drawn to creating funny characters and making audiences laugh the way she did."

== Television appearances ==
Show	Character	Year	Notes
The Vicar of Dibley	Bigamy lady	1998	
My Hero	Mrs Raven	2000–2006	
Brum	Mrs Posh	2001	
Miranda	School Careers Advisor	2009	
Can You Keep a Secret?	Pamela Anderson	2026	
