= List of My Hero episodes =

My Hero is a British television sitcom, created by Paul Mendelson, and produced by Big Bear Films for BBC One. The series, set in Northolt, west London, stars Ardal O'Hanlon as George Sunday, also known as "Thermoman", a dim-witted Ultronian superhero, and Emily Joyce as his human wife, Janet.

It initially gained consistent viewing figures for the BBC until the final series when O'Hanlon departed the role and ratings began to rapidly decline following the appointment of replacement James Dreyfus, ultimately leading to the series' cancellation.

During the course of the programme, 51 episodes of My Hero aired over six series, between 4 February 2000 and 10 September 2006. And a short My Hero Comic Relief special aired on March 16, 2001.

== Series overview ==
Series	Episodes	Originally released	
Series	Episodes	First released	Last released
1	7	4 February 2000	22 December 2000
2	6	14 May 2001	18 June 2001
3	10	7 June 2002	23 August 2002
4	10	8 August 2003	10 October 2003
5	10	7 January 2005	25 March 2005
6	8	21 July 2006	10 September 2006

== Episodes ==
=== Series 1 (2000) ===
No. overall	No. in series	Title	Directed by	Written by	Original release date	UK viewers (millions)
1	1	"My Hero"	John Stroud	Paul Mayhew-Archer and Paul Mendelson	4 February 2000	7.13
Northolt nurse Janet Dawkins attempts to return to a bit of normality after being rescued by Thermoman while she had been on vacation at the Grand Canyon. Unknown to her, the superhero has fallen in love with her, and attempts to approach her in his secret identity: hypochondriac Irishman George Sunday. Taking advice from his cousin Arnie, who runs a diner in New York City, George decides to find a way of dating Janet, and soon opts to reveal his real identity in order to prove his affection for her.
2	2	"Guess Who's Coming to Lunch"	John Stroud	Paul Mayhew-Archer and Paul Mendelson	11 February 2000	8.93
Janet invites George to move in with her as the pair begin a relationship, despite her not having the blessing of her parents Ella and Stanley. To avoid problems, she arranges for George to help prepare a Sunday lunch for them, but the matter is not helped when he finds himself struggling to be normal while attending to his superhero duties. At the same time, Janet's boss Piers, a neurotic TV doctor, makes plans to attempt to woo Janet into a relationship with him, through a new car.
3	3	"Mission Impossible"	John Stroud	Paul Mayhew-Archer and Paul Mendelson	18 February 2000	8.07
After Janet washes his costume to remove an unsightly stain before an urgent rescue mission, George suffers an allergic reaction to the washing powder she used. When he goes for a medical examination, Piers discovers his real identity and attempts to blackmail him. George is soon forced to conceal his secret by erasing the doctor's memory, though it soon causes Piers not only to lose his hair, but to forget all his knowledge of medicine.
4	4	"Thermoman's Greatest Challenge"	John Stroud	Paul Mayhew-Archer	25 February 2000	7.92
Patients and staff at the health centre become suspicious when Thermoman makes a number of repeated visits to save Janet from minor problems. Piers believes he has found a new celebrity friend and invites the superhero to be guest of honour at the fundraising party he has organised, to boost his own public image. Janet's parents insist that George also attends the party, so that he can personally thank Thermoman for saving Janet's life, which creates a serious problem for the superhero.
5	5	"Old Man Riverdance"	John Stroud	Paul Mayhew-Archer	3 March 2000	8.23
George is surprised when he receives a visit from his father Seamus, the original Thermoman, who now resides in a nursing home for retired superheroes in Florida. However, he soon discovers that the visit is due to his father being unhappy that his son is cohabiting with an Earth girl, and that it is interfering with his work. Having given the couple two days to try and prove him wrong, Janet hatches a plan: to have Seamus meet her parents in the hope he might change his mind about her relationship with his son.
6	6	"The Party's Over"	John Stroud	Paul Mayhew-Archer	10 March 2000	8.79
George plans a surprise party for Janet's 30th birthday, which proves to be a slightly confusing concept for the superhero – especially as he struggles to keep the party a secret. Leaving Janet with his cousin Arnie, George attempts to sway her parents, his next-door neighbour Tyler, Piers, and the doctor's secretary Mrs. Raven, to help with setting up the party, but it soon proves a complicated situation for the superhero to manage.
7	7	"Christmas"	John Stroud	Paul Mayhew-Archer and Paul Mendelson	22 December 2000	Under 5.93
George becomes puzzled about Christmas, but tries to get into the spirit of the festive holiday after Janet helps to explain about it. Interested in the legend of Father Christmas, George dresses up as him in order to deliver presents to Janet's parents, Piers, Mrs. Raven, Arnie and Tyler, but his good intentions do not go quite to plan, especially when the Christmas dinner is ruined.

=== Series 2 (2001) ===
No. overall	No. in series	Title	Directed by	Written by	Original release date	UK viewers (millions)
8	1	"Parents"	John Stroud	Paul Mayhew-Archer and Paul Mendelson	14 May 2001	8.63
When George's actions ruin the performances of Stanley and Ella during the Northolt Amateur Dramatic Society's latest performance, Janet finally snaps when she can no longer tolerate their criticism of her boyfriend. Her parents are soon stunned when she reveals George is Thermoman, which allows him to finally enjoy a better relationship with the pair. However, Ella's inability to keep his superhero identity a secret soon leads him to facing problems, especially when Mrs. Raven learns of who he is and tries to seduce him.
9	2	"Girlfriend"	John Stroud	Paul Alexander and Simon Braithwaite	21 May 2001	7.60
Janet is horrified when a woman from Ultron arrives in her flat, claiming that George is her fiancée. The documentation provided proves this to be the case, causing the couple to face a serious dilemma in their relationship, especially as Ella believes this will end the relationship between George and her daughter. As the wedding day between the two Ultronians edges closer, Janet is forced to find some way of ending the engagement, and soon discovers a detail that had been overlooked in the engagement document.
10	3	"Car"	John Stroud	Paul Alexander and Simon Braithwaite	28 May 2001	7.59
Seeking to earn money from his shop to buy Janet a car, George arranges for Arnie to have his superpowers restored by the Ultron Council so he can fill in for Thermoman. Arnie takes delight in being a superhero again, even more so when he falls for Mrs. Raven, but Janet soon discovers his old habits are hard to shake off when she finds he is stealing items, including the crown jewels, which soon creates a dilemma.
11	4	"Nemesis"	John Stroud	Gary Lawson and John Phelps	4 June 2001	7.73
George is shocked when his old school rival on Ultron, Rovi Gubelddim, turns up on Earth, unaware that he intends to ruin his life. Rovi swiftly takes over Piers' body to become a superhero called "Miracle Man". Not only does this allow Rovi to beat George to every major disaster, but he also uses his powers to seduce Janet. Needing help, George consults Arnie, who advises him that he must involve an ancient Ultronian ritual challenge to defeat him - an Ultronian version of rock paper scissors.
12	5	"Pregnant"	John Stroud	Paul Mayhew-Archer and Paul Mendelson	11 June 2001	8.54
When Janet discovers that she is pregnant, George is over the moon and decides to bequeath her superpowers to protect their unborn infant. Janet slowly takes great delight in being able to serve as a superheroine, but George soon regrets his actions when she changes into a woman he barely recognises as the one he loves. Meanwhile, Mrs. Raven takes advantage of a lie she makes to trick Piers into being nice to her, but it soon backfires when her lie becomes true.
13	6	"Wedding"	John Stroud	Paul Mayhew-Archer and Paul Mendelson	18 June 2001	9.17
Janet's parents are shocked when they find she is pregnant, unaware she is going through an Ultronian period of labour that lasts for a week. Not only does Stanley declare she and George must be married to avoid the baby being born out of wedlock, but Arnie also reveals to his cousin that the Ultron Council will strip him of his powers if he does not marry Janet. The couple swiftly find themselves needing to arrange a wedding quickly, before Janet goes into labour, creating a rather awkward situation for the pair.

=== Series 3 (2002) ===
No. overall	No. in series	Title	Directed by	Written by	Original release date	UK viewers (millions)
14	1	"Baby Talk"	John Stroud	Paul Mayhew-Archer and Paul Mendelson	7 June 2002	5.94
George and Janet struggle to cope with their marriage following the birth of their first child, especially in convincing the intelligent infant to act normal around others. While Arnie is brought in to help with the matter, the couple cannot agree on a name for their son as they struggle to prepare for him being seen by Stanley and Ella. Then their son disappears when he can no longer bear the arguments between his parents, leaving George and Janet to panic.
15	2	"Zero Tolerance"	John Stroud	Paul Mayhew-Archer and Paul Mendelson	14 June 2002	5.51
George thwarts an armed robbery as himself, rather than as Thermoman, and swiftly becomes a local hero for his bravery. Invited by Stanley to join the local Neighbourhood Watch scheme, he soon enjoys the popularity he gets, but things soon get out of hand when he begins enforcing the laws, especially against the others in the Watch. Fearful of what might happen, Ollie decides to help do something to prevent his father creating a difficult situation for Janet.
16	3	"Pet Rescue"	John Stroud	Paul Mayhew-Archer	21 June 2002	5.99
Ella and Stanley have decorators working on their home, and so accept Janet's offer to look after their dog, despite George not being thrilled about the situation. Deciding to adapt, he acquires an earpiece from Ultron that can let him talk to animals, in order to bond with the dog. He soon discovers that the animal is truly unhappy living with Ella and Stanley, prompting George to do whatever he can to help out, especially when things go badly wrong for the dog.
17	4	"The Older Man"	John Stroud	Paul Mayhew-Archer and Paul Mendelson	28 June 2002	4.96
The day after George's 327th birthday, Janet is shocked when he reveals that the lease on his Earthly alias has begun to expire, causing him to age rapidly. Fearful of losing her husband, Janet calls on Arnie for help, leading to the couple to see if the Ultron Council can provide George a new body. Meanwhile, Piers hires a new nurse for the surgery, despite her lack of medical knowledge, who soon transforms the doctor into something that Mrs. Raven soon despises.
18	5	"Puttin' on the Writs"	John Stroud	Paul Alexander and Simon Braithwaite	5 July 2002	5.23
Mrs. Raven finds herself rescued by Thermoman after nearly falling to her death, but when he rejects her affections, she swiftly seeks to make him pay by suing him for injuries she claimed to have received. George and Janet soon have to figure out a way to convince her to drop the matter. Meanwhile, Stanley moves in with Tyler after becoming fed up with Ella's nagging, but despite the freedom he gets, his wife soon convinces him that she misses him deeply despite their marriage's flaws.
19	6	"Shock, Horror!"	John Stroud	Paul Mayhew-Archer, Paul Mendelson and Paul Alexander	12 July 2002	5.02
When Ollie develops a fever, George's overprotective paternal instincts affect his ability to be a superhero and becoming careless. Soon a tabloid journalist discovers him with Janet, but while he does not discover George's true identity, he creates scandalous news stories that the couple soon seek to put a stop to. Meanwhile, Mrs. Raven seeks a reference from Piers to help her secure a part-time job for money she needs, though is forced to humiliate herself by being nice to him in return.
20	7	"Little Green Man"	John Stroud	Ian Brown and James Hendrie	2 August 2002	5.27
George is unfazed when he finds Janet in an innocent, but seemingly compromising, position with the handyman, much to her surprise. When she learns that George does not feel jealous about her behaving unfaithfully to him by such actions, she attempts to find a way of making him do so. A chance offering of carrot cake from Arnie, when everything else fails, soon brings out George's envy, only for Janet to be horrified when she learns that Ultronians literally turn green when this happens.
21	8	"Mine's a Double"	John Stroud	Paul Alexander and Simon Braithwaite	9 August 2002	5.55
George has to attend a superhero conference, and so arranges for a clone of himself, named Hilary, to look after Janet and Ollie and attend to his superhero duties in his absence. However, Hilary soon proves problematic for the superhero, who, suspicious of his ulterior motive, attempts to find out what he is planning. However, George finds himself framed for theft, prompting Janet to devise a plan to prove his innocence before the Ultron Council.
22	9	"A Little Learning"	John Stroud	Paul Mayhew-Archer and Paul Mendelson	16 August 2002	5.64
George is devastated when Ella and Stanley ban him from their anniversary party, as they fear he will embarrass them because of his stupidity. Seeking a solution, George soon learns that Ultron has found a way for him to increase his brain power, using the chemical makeup of pork scratchings. While his improved intellect sounds good, Janet soon discovers her husband has become addicted to the snack food and thus having his duties affected by them, prompting her to get Arnie to help him end his addiction.
23	10	"A Day to Remember"	John Stroud	Paul Mayhew-Archer and Paul Mendelson	23 August 2002	4.81
When George demonstrates to Janet how he can erase another's memories, he accidentally erases his own memory concerning his role as Thermoman. While Janet is delighted that her husband is the ideal father to help look after Ollie, she soon realises all is not well when scientists discover a meteor heading straight for Earth. With only 24 hours until impact, Janet, Arnie and Tyler are forced to retrain George in order for him to save the planet in its darkest hour.

=== Series 4 (2003) ===
No. overall	No. in series	Title	Directed by	Written by	Original release date	UK viewers (millions)
24	1	"A Sporting Chance"	John Stroud	Paul Mayhew-Archer	8 August 2003	5.19
George is asked to join the local cricket team, despite knowing very little about the sport. When he does take part, he initially hurts his own team with his fielding skills, before his superstrength aids his batting to allow them to win. George revels in his first win at anything, but Janet soon becomes concerned when he becomes addicted to it, after a jealous Piers challenges him with other sporting events.
25	2	"The Living Dead"	John Stroud	Paul Mayhew-Archer	15 August 2003	6.26
Janet is shocked when George suddenly collapses from what appears to be a heart attack, only to be surprised when he comes back to life. Her husband soon reveals that he has a defect in his hearts that needs treatment, but it soon causes problems when he collapses from another attack at the surgery, leading others to think he has died. Meanwhile, Mrs. Raven decides to become a hypnotherapist in order to hypnotise people to do humiliating things, which soon gets too out of hand for Janet's liking.
26	3	"Taking the Credit"	John Stroud	James Cary	22 August 2003	6.40
George believes he has hit the jackpot when he discovers credit cards, unaware of what they mean. When Janet discovers how much he has spent when the card bills arrive, she decides they must win the money from the lottery. With Ollie's help, the couple achieve success by abusing his powers, until George discovers that his recent actions have now drawn the attention of a powerful Ultronian figurehead, who intends to punish him for what he has done.
27	4	"It's All in the Mind"	John Stroud	Paul Mayhew-Archer	29 August 2003	6.19
George is asked by the Ultron Council to write a progress report on humanity, leading him to acquiring the power of mind-reading to achieve this. But the unpleasant thoughts of Stanley, Ella, Piers, and Mrs. Raven, leave him in a state of despair, forcing him to write an honest report. When Janet learns that the Ultron Council has condemned the human race because of the report, George reveals the only way to avoid this fate is for him to get the very people he wrote about to donate money to a good cause.
28	5	"Space Virus"	John Stroud	Paul Mayhew-Archer and Paul Mendelson	5 September 2003	6.49
Janet is shocked when George returns home from Ultron with a parasitic disease that is fatal to humans and contagious. When she, Stanley, Ella and Mrs. Raven catch the disease, George is forced to administer an unusual treatment to cure them. But this inadvertently cause him to transfer some of his superpowers to them, which soon creates problems, as Janet's parents tackle rescues but are reluctant to save just anyone, while Mrs. Raven uses her powers for evil deeds.
29	6	"The Mayor of Northolt"	John Stroud	Trevelyan Evans and Pete Sinclair	12 September 2003	6.32
A faulty streetlight outside Stanley and Ella's bedroom is keeping them awake at night, and getting the Council to mend it proves impossible. George decides to stand for Mayor, promising to fix the streetlight if elected, only to find that his opponent is none other than Piers. George wins unanimous approval when the voters respond positively to his refreshingly honest approach, but unfortunately, the pressures of Mayoral Office put an unreasonable strain on his marriage, causing Janet to move out. And matters are made even worse when Piers tries to sabotage his campaign.
30	7	"Big"	John Stroud	Gary Lawson and John Phelps	19 September 2003	6.19
Ollie's half-human, half Ultronian physiology begins to cause problems when he starts to grow at an accelerated rate. In twenty-four hours, he grows from a nine-month-old baby into a nineteen-year-old boy, with a "serious" girlfriend. Janet and George are distraught at being robbed of the pleasure of watching their only son grow up. They employ the services of an eminent Ultronian doctor to cure their son, but things turn from bad to worse when Ollie turns into an eighteen-year-old girl.
31	8	"The Consultant"	John Stroud	James Cary	26 September 2003	6.21
Arnie is forced to turn consultant when the Ultron Council send him to check up on Thermoman's performance. He begins by conducting a Time and Motion study and begins to make some changes. However, a plethora of customer satisfaction forms quickly hamper Thermoman's ability to rescue the victims of natural disasters. Fearing for the world's safety, George retires, but soon changes his mind when his replacement, Work Experience Boy, is unable to save Janet, who is trapped in the burning health centre.
32	9	"The Family Way"	John Stroud	Trevelyan Evans and Pete Sinclair	3 October 2003	6.51
George discovers that he has accidentally agreed to be a surrogate parent for a couple living on Ultron. Janet is forced to claim that George has been putting on weight – but when he gives birth, they discover that he has been carrying the son of an Ape couple, who have taken the form of what they believed to be the most intelligent beings on the planet. Meanwhile, Piers embarrasses himself, when having found the sonogram of the baby, he concludes that Stanley is actually the pregnant man, when in reality he is just suffering from kidney stones.
33	10	"Time and Time Again"	John Stroud	Paul Mayhew-Archer	10 October 2003	7.17
George's April Fool's joke backfires on him and forces him to leave Janet to spend some time alone. However, when he returns, he discovers that he has been away seven years. He and Arnie decide to go back in time, using a dangerous series of time portals, to return everything to normal. However, George soon decides to use this to his advantage, and make little adjustments to life. However, as usual, his plans fail to work, and it soon results in Janet becoming bald, falling in love with Piers, having ten children, and Arnie becoming the father of Janet's brother "Arnold".

=== Series 5 (2005) ===
No. overall	No. in series	Title	Directed by	Written by	Original release date	UK viewers (millions)
34	1	"The Foresight Saga"	John Stroud	Paul Mayhew-Archer and Paul Mendelson	7 January 2005	5.66
Janet gives birth to a baby girl, which decides to name itself Cassie, short for Cassandra. However, her birth is far from normal, leading to an incorrect prediction that Janet's close friends and family are all going to die. George, believing that Ultronian powers of foresight are never wrong, prepares to move everyone in the Northern Hemisphere to safety. However, he leaves himself open to humiliation when Cassie's powers prove to be less than perfect.
35	2	"Illegal Aliens"	John Stroud	Paul Mayhew-Archer	14 January 2005	5.42
George and Arnie find themselves under intense scrutiny when an immigration officer turns up, looking for evidence of illegal aliens. George creates a fake accident in order to sway the officer away from his investigation, but will it be successful enough to get the charges against George and Arnie dropped? Meanwhile, Mrs. Raven scams Piers into believing that he has a secret love child, which in turn results in payments of money that Mrs. Raven agrees to 'hand over' to the child, but is in turn keeping for herself.
36	3	"The First Husbands' Club"	John Stroud	Paul Mayhew-Archer	21 January 2005	4.76
After being conned by Piers into paying for a car accident which he did not cause, George decides to organise a militant men's group, with Arnie, Tyler and Stanley. However, his motto of 'A woman's place is in the kitchen' soon begins to cause outrage amongst the female population, and begins to give men the confidence to regain authority over their women. Soon enough, the majority of female population find themselves enslaved to men – but not Mrs. Raven, who continues to delight in making Piers's life a living hell, without him realising she is responsible.
37	4	"Cassie Come Home"	John Stroud	Daniel Peak	28 January 2005	4.63
George and Janet find themselves in a sticky situation when Ella becomes a Justice of the Peace – and a Magistrate – and decides to monitor the children, to see the way they are being brought up and educated. Things go disastrously wrong when Arnie plies the children with cans of alcohol, and Tyler is left to muddle their brains during a babysitting session – leaving Ella no choice but to take the children into care. However, the children are left unimpressed by the decision – and decide to "escape". The bad news comes when Cassie fails to return home...
38	5	"Nothing to Hide"	John Stroud	James Cary	4 February 2005	4.83
George finds himself in an impossible situation when he rescues the stolen Mona Lisa from the clutches of an art thief - but is unable to explain to Scotland Yard detectives why the painting has ended up in his flat. Things turn from bad to worse when George is given an electronic tag, to track him at all times. How will he be able to explain his activities? In an attempt to save George's bacon, Janet, Arnie and Tyler hatch a plan to return the painting to its owners - but Stanley scuppers their chance when he punches a hole through the picture in an attempt to make Janet see the real George.
39	6	"Brain Drain"	John Stroud	Daniel Peak	11 February 2005	4.89
George attempts to make the internet safer for his children to use, only to result in himself suffering from a bout of "pop-ups" syndrome. To solve the problem, Arnie uses a mind filter to remove the "pop-ups", and any other useless information and prejudices caught in George's mind. However, George begins to use the mind filter to his advantage, removing any reference of Ella and Stanley from his memory. However, the mind filter becomes overloaded – leaving the minds of his friends and family all scrambled up.
40	7	"Fear and Clothing"	John Stroud	Trevelyan Evans and Pete Sinclair	25 February 2005	Under 4.77
George's superstitions regarding Friday the thirteenth begin to come true, causing him to doubt his invincibility – which in turn, affects his ability to rescue people. He soon turns into a nervous wreck and starts disappearing whenever he is scared. Can Janet and Arnie find a way to cure George of his fears before it is too late? Meanwhile, Piers jumps on another bandwagon, by launching his own diet – The Crispin Diet, no less – and health drink. But little does he know that the diet may be hazardous to his own health.
41	8	"How Green Was My Ollie?"	John Stroud	James Cary	4 March 2005	5.17
In an attempt to get Ollie to eat his vegetables, George brings back some genetically modified vegetables from Ultron. However, these vegetables soon begin to create some unfortunate side-effects for both Ollie and George. George, whose mind is scrambled, accidentally makes the mink whale extinct by using it to plug a volcano. Thus, Piers sees an opportunity to ruin Thermoman's career – and starts a campaign against his abuse of nature. And things soon turn from bad to worse when Ella jumps on the bandwagon.
42	9	"Big Bother"	John Stroud	Paul Mayhew-Archer	18 March 2005	5.32
George decides to treat Janet on their five-year anniversary, attempting to give her the perfect day. However, their peace is soon shattered when an Ultronian television producer arrives at the flat, and announces that the last six months of their lives have been filmed and beamed across the galaxy in a reality television show entitled Thermowatch. George and Janet decide to stick with the show, until Arnie decides to create his own show, Filth, and his nocturnal activities with Mrs. Raven begin to attract more viewers.
43	10	"Night Fever"	John Stroud	Daniel Peak	25 March 2005	5.48
George receives the shock of his life when he wakes up in bed next to Mrs. Raven. Little does he know that it is only a dream – and that he has lost his ability to distinguish dreams from reality, due to his love of Brussels sprouts. Unable to get the idea of him and Mrs. Raven sleeping together out of his head, he decides that he must leave Janet, and instead start a new life with Mrs. Raven and her triplets. It's up to Janet, Arnie and Tyler to make him see sense, before it is too late – and he has runaway with a madwoman.

=== Series 6 (2006) ===
Series six was the first and only series to feature James Dreyfus in the lead role, taking over from the outgoing Ardal O'Hanlon. Due to declining ratings, and the poor public reception to Dreyfus, the series was axed, leading to the final two episodes being broadcast on Sunday lunchtimes, rather than the prime-time slot on Friday evenings.

No. overall	No. in series	Title	Directed by	Written by	Original release date	UK viewers (millions)
44	1	"Footloose"	John Stroud	Paul Mayhew-Archer and Daniel Peak	21 July 2006	Under 3.15
George is introduced to poker by Arnie after falling on hard times when his health shop is forced to close down. However, unable to grasp the basic rules of the game, he ends up losing his body to a pair of big Ultronian gamblers. With only his soul remaining, the Ultron Council are forced to give him a new body. Janet is allowed to pick the new alias of her husband, but fails to click with the two initial disguises. She is forced to keep the third, but struggles to accept George in his new form.
45	2	"Here's One I Made Earlier"	John Stroud	Paul Mayhew-Archer and Andrea Solomons	28 July 2006	Under 3.47
Janet is still finding it hard to adjust to George's new disguise, and wonders if this means that they have to start their relationship all over again. The task is made more difficult by some well-kept secrets finding their way out of the closet: George has a lovechild, which is living on Ultron with his stepfather, and Janet's old boyfriend, who has managed to track her down through a dating site. Meanwhile, Piers finds himself engaged to a stunningly beautiful woman who loves him unconditionally. Until he dies, that is.
46	3	"My Kingdom for a Cat"	John Stroud	Katie Douglas	4 August 2006	Under 3.82
After attempting to help Janet get used to his new disguise, George finds himself desperately trying to get Janet to fall back in love with him. In an effort to endear himself to Janet, and to at last get back in the bedroom, rather than sleeping on the sofa, George seeks advice on what really makes a woman happy. George decides to pay a visit to the cat king of Ultron, only to find himself so deeply involved with catlike tendencies that he begins coughing up hairballs, and grows a tail and whiskers to watch.
47	4	"Sidekick"	John Stroud	Jon Brown	11 August 2006	Under 3.29
George agrees to take on some of Piers's patients, so that he can practise his golf swing. But with his duties as Thermoman continuing, he decides to reduce his workload by finding a sidekick, with a little help from Arnie. His choice is a beautiful, statuesque, six-foot tall blonde called Lula, a choice which leaves Janet even less impressed than before. When George is demoted to Sticky Tape Boy as a result of Lula's efficiency at her job, he realises something has to be done, as he is at risk of losing his livelihood – and his wife.
48	5	"Dermoman"	John Stroud	Daniel Peak	25 August 2006	Under 3.61
George is caught breaking the speed limit by the Ultronian Police, and thus, has to re-sit his superhero theory test. Janet tells him he has to pass, otherwise he will lose his licence and will be sent back to Ultron forever. Tyler attempts to persuade George to join a gym, in order to burn off some of the vigour that he has been collecting in the bedroom department. Meanwhile, Ella believes that Stanley is turning into a homosexual, and attempts to restore his body to its previous state by secretly slipping him some of Arnie's reverse steroids – which a catastrophic effect.
49	6	"Top of the Table"	John Stroud	James Cary	1 September 2006	Under 3.65
George's position as the second-best superhero in the Galaxy sparks him into creating a brand of his own Thermoman merchandise, with a little help from Arnie. He soon begins to believe that his mass-market idea will help him take the crown of ultimate superhero – but he soon discovers that his idea has gone catastrophically wrong, and he is now only fourteenth in the table. In an attempt to boost his ratings, he attempts to complete a number of 'good deeds'. However, allowing Tyler to fall from a multi-storey balcony and ruining the Northolt Players production of 'Othello' soon begin to dent his table position even more.
50	7	"Not for Prophet"	John Stroud	James Cary	3 September 2006	Under 3.65
George becomes determined to prove his devotion as a father, and thus, decides to set up an Ultronian faith school to give Cassie a taste of Ultronian culture – much to Janet's despair. However, before he can do so, he must decide on the name of the faith he is going to invent. His efforts to convert Northolt to Wa-Tu-Ma-Hey-Go-Fla lead to George convincing himself – and an impressive crowd of followers – that he must be the chosen one. However, Tyler's impromptu announcement regarding the chosen one being a virgin leads to a rooftop fight between George and Piers.
51	8	"Believe"	John Stroud	Gary Lawson and John Phelps	10 September 2006	Under 3.99
George finds himself turning into a one-man wrecking ball after his super powers appear to have deserted him. Janet insists he sorts himself out, but he does not know what is wrong, and hopes it is just a temporary blip. In an attempt to return himself to his former glory, George asks Arnie to give him a MOT performance test, which reveals that his confidence is completely shot. After helping Piers promote his new book, Arnie realises that George has gone from having no confidence, to being completely arrogant – and thus decides that the only way to save him is to give him a new head.

== Comic Relief special ==
A special short episode of My Hero aired as part of BBC One's Comic Relief Red Nose Day Special on March 16, 2001.

No.	Title	Directed by	Written by	Original release date
1	Comic Relief Special	John Stroud	John Stroud	16 March 2001
The world enters a state of turmoil when Thermoman uses his powers to stop all the world's problems, leading to many popular TV shows to be cancelled.
