= Emily Joyce =

British actress (born 1969)

- Born: 12 April 1969 (age 57); London, England, UK
- Occupation: Actress
- Years active: 1995–present
- Spouse: Adam Astle (m. 2002)
- Children: 2
- Relatives: Rachel Joyce

Emily Sian Joyce (born 12 April 1969) is an English actress, known for playing the role of Janet Dawkins in the BBC comedy series My Hero between 2000 and 2006.

== Early life ==
Joyce was born in London, England. When she was fifteen years old, she was accepted at the National Youth Theatre. She worked at Vogue, afterward enrolling in drama school.

== Career ==
After drama school, Joyce joined the Royal Shakespeare Company. Her first television role was in the ITV drama Cracker, in which she played the murderer in a 1995 episode. She also starred in another ITV1 drama series, Grafters, in 1999, and in 2003 she played DC Havers' new boss in The Inspector Lynley Mysteries.

Joyce appeared in the British comedy series My Hero. She played the character of Janet Dawkins, opposite superhero Thermoman, originally played by Ardal O'Hanlon and followed by James Dreyfus.

In 2003, she appeared in series 2 episode 6 of Ultimate Force, playing Nicky Strong.

Also in 2003, Joyce played vengeful serial killer Anna Marchent/Sarah Herd in the two-part BBC crime drama Messiah 2: Vengeance Is Mine starring Ken Stott.

In 2007, she appeared in the light-hearted drama Hotel Babylon, playing Estelle. She also played Kate in the comedy drama Little Devil.

In the first half of 2008, she appeared in Happy Now?, a new play by Lucinda Coxon at the National Theatre, London. Also in 2008, she appeared in the six-part BBC comedy drama series Mutual Friends as Martin's (Marc Warren) boss Sarah Fletcher.

In 2010, Joyce played Dr Sandra Fleming in Universal Soldier: Regeneration. In the same year, she appeared as the Prime Minister's special policy adviser, Claire Sutton, in Antony Jay's and Jonathan Lynn's stage version of Yes, Prime Minister, which premiered at the Chichester Festival in May 2010 and moved to the Gielgud Theatre in London's West End in September 2010. In 2011, Joyce appeared in series 7 episode 19 of the BBC school-based drama Waterloo Road as local superstar DJ Viv O'Donnell. In 2013, Joyce appeared in an episode, "Down Among the Fearful", of the ITV drama Lewis as Jane Grace. In 2011, Joyce starred in the one-off BBC Christmas show Lapland. In 2024, she appeared in the BBC daytime soap opera Doctors as Katie Elton, the wife of established character Graham Elton (Alex Avery).

== Filmography ==
=== Film ===
Year	Title	Role	Notes
1997	The Woodlanders	Libby	
2007	National Treasure: Book of Secrets	Palace Guide	
2009	Universal Soldier: Regeneration	Dr. Sandra Flemming	

=== Television ===
Year	Title	Role	Notes
1995	Cracker	Janice	Serial: "True Romance"
1997	Jane Eyre	Miss Temple	Television film
1997	Wycliffe	Morna Petheric	Episode: "Seen a Ghost"
1997-2017	Casualty	Various	3 episodes
1998	In Exile	Ellen	7 episodes
1998	Grafters	Laura	8 episodes
1999	Trial by Fire	WDC. Scott	Television film
2000	Hero of the Hour	Sylvie	Television film
2000–2006	My Hero	Janet Dawkins	51 episodes; main role
2001	Comic Relief: Say Pants to Poverty	Janet Dawkins	
2001	The Glass	Emma Rice	6 episodes; mini-series
2001-2013	Midsomer Murders	Bernadette Sullivan/Valerie Fergus-Johnson	2 episodes
2003	Messiah 2: Vengeance is Mine	Anna Marchent	2 episodes
2003	The Inspector Lynley Mysteries	Emily Barlow	Episode: "Deception on His Mind"
2003	Ultimate Force	Nicky Strong	Episode: "Dead Is Forever"
2006	Doctor Who	Alien (voice)	Episode: "The Girl in the Fireplace"
2006	Dalziel and Pascoe	Natalie Lawson	Episodes: "Fallen Angel"
2007	Hotel Babylon	Estelle	Episode: #2.4
2007	Little Devil	Katie Bishop	3 episodes
2008	Fairy Tales	Joyce Fletcher	Episode: "Rapunzel"
2008	Mutual Friends	Sarah	6 episodes
2009	My Almost Famous Family	Jill	9 episodes
2010	Silent Witness	Muriel	Episode: "Voids"
2010	The Bill	Jane Wallace	1 episode: "Deadly Consequences"
2010-2024	Doctors	Diana Hardcastle/Katie Elton	2 episodes
2011	Holby City	Kate Cahill	3 episodes
2011	Waterloo Road	Viv O'Donnell	Series 7 Episode 19
2011	Lapland	Miranda	Episode: "Lapland"
2013	Lewis	Jane Grace	Episode: "Down Among the Fearful"
2013	New Tricks	Daniella Yates	Episode: "Wild Justice"
2016	EastEnders	Dr Janice May	2 episodes
2016	Agatha Raisin	Juliet	Episode: "Agatha Raisin and the Murderous Marriage"
2016	Friday Night Dinner	Melissa	Episode: "For Sale"
2016	Filcher & Crook	Evangeline De'Salle	TV Mini Series
2016-2017	Jack and Dean of All Trades	Jack's Mum	2 episodes
2017	Vera	Caroline Andersen	Episode: "Natural Selection"
2017	Sunset Dreams	Anne Tiller	
2017	Judge Rinder's Crown Court	Abby Fry - Defence Counsel	TV Mini Series
2020	Father Brown	Edith Dobson	Episode: "The Wisdom of the Fool"
2021	McDonald & Dodds	Diane	Episode: "The War of Rose"
2022	Call the Midwife	Norma Johnson	Episode: Series 11 Episode 7

=== Radio ===
Year	Title	Role	Notes
2005-2008	The Spaceship	Melissa Paterson	
2009	Accomplices	Hattie	Afternoon Play
2013	Shooting Animals	Fran	Pilot
