= Chris Ellison (actor) =

English actor (born 1946)

- Born: Christopher Michael Ellison; 16 December 1946 (age 79); London, United Kingdom
- Occupation: Actor
- Years active: 1967–2021
- Spouse: Anita Ellison (m. 1980)
- Children: 2

Christopher Michael Ellison (born 16 December 1946 in St Pancras, London) is a British actor from London. He is best known for his role as DI (later DCI) Frank Burnside in the ITV police series The Bill (1984–2000), and short-lived spin-off series Burnside (2000).

== Education ==
At school his art teacher encouraged him having seen his talent. Art remained his strong subject throughout his school years, and it was a natural progression that Ellison then moved on to art college, firstly at Wimbledon and then Camberwell.

== Career ==
He served in the Merchant Navy, trained as a graphic designer and worked as a minicab driver. His first drama job was assistant stage manager at the Richmond Theatre. His first acting role was in the play Woman in a Dressing Gown at said theatre. His first major guest role was an appearance in The Sweeney (1975).

He appeared in many guest roles in TV shows throughout the 1970s, including episodes of The Professionals, Dempsey and Makepeace and Bergerac, and in the films Rosie Dixon – Night Nurse (1978), Lady Oscar (1979), Minder (1982), Brush Strokes (1986) and Buster (1988), based on the Great Train Robbery of 1963. In 1981, he had a notable role as bent DI in the ITV crime mini-series Wolcott, a performance with marked similarities to his later work in The Bill.

In 1984, he appeared in Paul McCartney's feature film Give My Regards to Broad Street playing Rath's Minder. In 1986, he played criminal gang leader Charlie Elkin in Running Scared, based on Bernard Ashley's novel.

Having first appeared as Detective Sergeant Tommy Burnside in 1984, he became a regular cast member of The Bill from 1988 to 1993 now with the name Frank Burnside appearing as Detective Inspector. After an absence of five years, Burnside returned on a semi-regular basis from 1998 to 2000 having been promoted to the rank of Detective Chief Inspector during the interim.

He appeared in one episode of the sci-fi police series Crime Traveller in 1997.

=== 2003–2010 ===
In 2003, Ellison played the lead role in the revived series of Fort Boyard, which aired on Challenge. In 2005, he guest starred in the Doctor Who audio adventure The Game. In 2007, Ellison played the role of Len Harker in the BBC One soap opera EastEnders.

He has appeared in Casualty and Judge John Deed, among other appearances on Soccer AM, and presenting roles in The World's Most Stupid Criminals and Mousetrapped.

In February 2009, Ellison won Celebrity Come Dine with Me on Channel 4. In 2009, he appeared in the film A Silent Whistle and in 2010 Bonded by Blood and Basement.

=== 2011–2017 ===
In August 2011, he appeared in a New Tricks episode titled "Half Life" as a prisoner. On 27 August 2015, he entered the Celebrity Big Brother house. He was evicted on 8 September 2015.

In 2017, he appeared on the celebrity version of the television game show Pointless.

== Personal life ==
=== Books ===
In 1989, Ellison illustrated the children's books Otto and the Sea Circus, written by his future The Bill co-star Tom Cotcher.

In 2020, Ellison shared his memories of his early work on The Bill for the book Witness Statements: Making The Bill (Series 1-3). A follow-up volume, Witness Statements: Making The Bill (1988) was published in 2022, also featuring memories from Ellison about his time as Frank Burnside during the earliest half-hour episodes of the programme.

=== Aphasia diagnosis ===
In April 2022, Ellison revealed that he had been suffering from aphasia for about 18 months. Ellison's decision to publicly disclose his condition was inspired by American actor Bruce Willis's announcement that he too had the condition.

Ellison had been diagnosed with the condition following a stroke in mid-2020 when his wife discovered him lying on their bedroom floor at their home in Brighton. He had to be removed via a skylight due to the ambulance crew not being able to move him down a spiral staircase. Ellison was moved to a rehabilitation centre in Haywards Heath.

When Ellison returned home in November 2020, his wife became his full-time carer but she credits their two adult children and Ellison's former castmate Mark Wingett for providing valuable support. Due to his condition hampering his ability to communicate, Ellison became anxious when leaving the house due to the fear of being recognised and not being able to engage in conversation. Despite having difficulty speaking, Ellison can fully understand what others are saying.

Despite initially being reluctant to publicise his diagnosis, Ellison and his wife hope that by sharing their experience with aphasia it will enable other people to develop an awareness and understanding of the condition.

== Filmography ==
=== Film ===
Year	Title	Role
1974	Ransom	Pete
1977	Blind Man's Bluff	Smithy
1978	Rosie Dixon – Night Nurse	Dr. Adam Quint
1979	Lady Oscar	Maximilien de Robespierre
1984	Give My Regards to Broad Street	Rath's Minder
1988	Buster	George
1988	The Most Dangerous Man in the World	Ipekci
2002	What Larry Says	Frank Swire
2004	Griffin	Richard Atlas
2010	Basement	Lecturer
2010	Bonded by Blood	Trent
2011	As You Like It	Duke Frederick
2011	The Limelight	Max Seymour
2013	Great Expectations	Magwitch
2014	We Still Kill the Old Way	Roy Edwards
2016	Mob Handed	The Father
2016	We Still Steal the Old Way	Roy Edwards
2017	Bonded by Blood 2	Trent
2018	Tango One	Terry James
2018	The Krays: Dead Man Walking	Albert Donoghue
2018	King of Crime	Edward
2021	The Ghosts of Borley Rectory	Basil Payne

=== Television ===
Year	Title	Role	Notes
1967	Emergency Ward 10	Dr. O'Rourke	Episode: "The Last Dance"
1975	The Sweeney	Phillip Budd	Episode: "Queen's Pawn"
1977	The Professionals	Biggs, CI5 Agent	Episode: "Private Madness, Public Danger"
1978	The Professionals	Paul Coogan	Episode: "The Rack"
1981	Lady Killers	Detective Inspector Spooner	Episode: "Make It a Double"
1982	Minder	Charlie	Episode: "The Son Also Rises"
1983	Widows	Tony Fisher	
1983	Tucker's Luck	Betting Shop Manager	
1984	Chance In A Million	Mr. Hodgkiss	Episode: "The Birthday Party"
1984, 1988–1993, 1998–2000	The Bill	DS Tommy, later DI and then DCI Frank, Burnside	Regular role
1985	Dempsey & Makepeace	Tommy	Episode: "Hors de Combat"
1986	Running Scared	Charlie Elkin	Recurring role
1986	Brush Strokes	Reg	1 episode
1986–1987	Bread	Mr. Wilson/D.H.S.S Claimant Mr. Wilson	2 episodes
1987	Casualty	Wayne Davisson	Series 2
1994–1996	Ellington	Ellington	1 pilot movie and 7 episodes
1997	Crime Traveller	Jack Slade	Episode 5
1997	Birds of a Feather	Davey Cooper	Episode: "Reservoir Birds"
2000	Burnside	Frank Burnside	All 6 episodes
2001	Judge John Deed	Mike Briggs	2 episodes
2001	Combat Sheep	DI Hindle	TV film
2003	Fort Boyard	Boyard	Episode: #5.1
2005	Monkey Trousers	Police Officer	Episode: #1.1
2006	Dream Team	Lawrie Hannigan	2 episodes
2007	EastEnders	Len	4 episodes
2011	New Tricks	Derek 'Smiley' Robinson	Episode: "Half Life"
2011	Casualty	Danny Weaver	Episode: "Fixed"
2014	Jamaica Inn	Fleece Innkeeper	Episode: #1.2
2016	Casualty	Larry Niven	Episode: "Bah Humbug"
2016	Walliams & Friend	Christopher Ellison	2 episodes
