= Gimme Gimme Gimme (TV series) =

BBC TV sitcom (1999–2001)

- Genre: Sitcom
- Created by: Jonathan Harvey
- Developed by: Jonathan Harvey; Kathy Burke
- Starring: Kathy Burke; James Dreyfus; Rosalind Knight; Brian Bovell; Beth Goddard
- Opening theme: "Gimme! Gimme! Gimme! (A Man After Midnight)" by ABBA
- Ending theme: "Gimme! Gimme! Gimme! (A Man After Midnight)" by ABBA
- Country of origin: United Kingdom
- Original language: English
- No. of series: 3
- No. of episodes: 19 (+1 Comic Relief sketch) (list of episodes)

Production
- Executive producers: Jon Plowman; Peter Bennett-Jones; Mark Chapman
- Producers: Sue Vertue; Matthew Francis
- Running time: 30 minutes
- Production companies: Tiger Aspect Productions; Hartswood Films (series 2)

Original release
- Network: BBC Two (series 1–2); BBC One (series 3)
- Release: 8 January 1999 – 14 December 2001

Gimme Gimme Gimme is a BBC television sitcom by Tiger Aspect Productions that was first aired in three series from 1999 to 2001. It was written by Jonathan Harvey, who developed the series with Kathy Burke, who stars as loudmouthed Londoner Linda La Hughes, with James Dreyfus co-starring as her gay flatmate, actor Tom Farrell.

The title from the show stems from both the main characters' continual search for a male partner, and the theme music is a cover of ABBA's "Gimme! Gimme! Gimme! (A Man After Midnight)". The first two series were originally shown on BBC Two and were deemed successful enough for the third series to be shown on BBC One.

Burke received two BAFTA nominations for Best Comedy Performance for playing the lead character, Linda La Hughes. The show received a nomination in the Best Scripted Comedy category for its third series.

== Premise ==
Gimme Gimme Gimme centres on loudmouthed Londoner Linda La Hughes (played by comedian and director Kathy Burke) and her gay flatmate, actor Tom Farrell (played by James Dreyfus). A modern twist on the traditional "odd couple" format, much of Gimme Gimme Gimme's humour springs from its lubricious innuendo subplot, which comes from the mouths of both Tom and Linda.

Linda is characterised by her red hair, white glasses and plump, lycra-clad figure. Boorish, unattractive Linda is convinced she is a "stunner"; in series three she is finally diagnosed with reverse body dysmorphic disorder. It is suggested that Linda and Tom first met at a nightclub, bonded instantly (due to both being on ecstasy), and decided to live together. What follows is, as writer Jonathan Harvey describes, "one long comedown". Linda often tells humorous anecdotes about her family and childhood which suggest abuse or neglect (such as how she apparently slept on a doormat as a baby, lived in a kennel as a child, and was left in a car-boot for the two weeks her aunt went on holiday), but she always thinks of these as positive experiences. She also claims that her Daddy now lives in an iron lung, although the only proof she has is a photo of a sideboard. Linda also lived in a convent and was sent to a borstal as a teenager. She has crushes on Liam Gallagher (in whom she lost interest after series one as she "couldn't bring up another bird's child"), Robbie Williams, and both male members of Hear'Say. She also imagines having sex with Dale Winton in a toilet cubicle.

Tom is melodramatic yet fails in his desire to get acting roles. He believes himself to be truly gifted in the art of acting, and often blames his failures on his agent or society itself. He did appear in one episode of EastEnders and often brags about it, delaying for as long as he can the fact that he was in one scene, had one line, and did nothing but buy a cagoule from Bianca Jackson's market stall. He also appeared in Daylight Robbery as an extra, standing in a queue in the background. He had one line but it was cut due to timekeeping. He insists that the entire series was ruined due to the axing of his line. Tom has an obsession with appearing to be middle-class even though he hails from a working-class background, possibly because he also hates his parents. It is often suggested that Tom has no friends whatsoever (apart from Linda and his housemates) but unlike Linda he usually tries to pretend he is popular. Tom is in love with the actor Simon Shepherd.

Although they appear to loathe each other, Tom and Linda are beholden to each other due to the simple fact that nobody else can tolerate them. They are in many ways alike: selfish, unsuccessful, and physically and personally unattractive – although Tom less so. The hapless duo live in a Kentish Town flat (69 Paradise Passage, Kentish Town) rented from elderly ex-prostitute Beryl Merit (Rosalind Knight), who lives in the upstairs flat. Other regular characters are the middle-class, horny married couple Jez (Brian Bovell) and Suze (Beth Goddard), who live in the basement flat. Many of the storylines revolve around the fact that Tom and Linda find Jez sexually attractive and (particularly Linda) despise the oblivious Suze. Another recurring character is Sugar Walls (Elaine Lordan), Linda's celebrity sister. Many of the other characters can be just as hapless as Tom and Linda; Beryl still engages in sexual activities such as S&M and picking up young and married men, while Jez and Suze generally lack common sense. For example, they once cancelled their holiday to the Algarve and paid £500 to stay in their own back garden after Linda opened it up as a campsite.

On at least one occasion the fourth wall is broken when a previous series was referenced by Linda.

At the end of series three, Tom finally got his big break in TV soap opera Crossroads. The last episode ended with Tom leaving the flat and Linda taking off her hair (revealing it to be a wig) and sitting in the flat alone.

== Characters ==
=== Regular ===
Linda La Hughes (Kathy Burke) – Linda is portrayed as an unattractive thirty-something woman who usually wears skin tight, colourful clothing. Linda grabs any opportunity to bluntly flirt with any man she sees. She is delusional about her appearance. Her age is uncertain as she has announced different ages through the three series.

Thomas Thessalonius "Tom" Farrell (James Dreyfus) – Tom is a 30-year-old wannabe (but bad) actor who has only had small roles on TV and on stage. Tom is openly gay and seizes every possible opportunity to get a boyfriend.

Beryl Merit (Rosalind Knight) – Beryl is the elderly landlady of 69 Paradise Passage. She is a retired prostitute but stays involved in criminal activities such as shoplifting and bootlegging.

Jez Littlewood (Brian Bovell) – Jez is Tom and Linda's hunky middle-class neighbour.

Suze Littlewood (Beth Goddard) – Suze is Jez's ditzy wife. She can sometimes be nice but on other occasions she can be hyperactive and rather irritating, unintentionally coming off as a burden. Tom and Linda loathe Suze for standing in the way of their pursuit of Jez.

=== Recurring ===
Norma (Doña Croll) – Tom's agent who features in every series.

Sharon Hughes/Sugar Walls (Elaine Lordan) is Linda's famous sister. She is a model, but is more famous for her promiscuity than her modelling career. She appears in series 1 and returns in series 2.

Simon Shepherd is Tom's celebrity crush. Simon is famous for starring in Peak Practice. He appears in every series.

=== Guest appearances ===
- Michele Austin
- Frances Barber
- Mark Benton
- Adrian Bower
- Moya Brady
- Richard Cant
- Debbie Chazen
- Charlie Condou
- Phil Daniels
- Hazel Douglas
- Mel Giedroyc
- Jonathan Harvey
- William Hope
- Anna Keaveney
- Rose Keegan
- Chris Langham
- Nimmy March
- Geraldine McNulty
- Melinda Messenger
- Ann Mitchell
- Mark Monero
- Patsy Palmer
- Sue Perkins
- Su Pollard. Pollard played a character called Heidi Honeycombe; when she appeared, Linda greeted her with "Heidi! Hi!" (a reference to Hi-de-Hi! in which Pollard starred).
- Rowland Rivron
- Zita Sattar
- David Schneider
- Christopher Simon
- Sophie Stanton
- Ronan Vibert
- Dale Winton
- The Pink Singers

== Production ==
The series was filmed in front of a live studio audience in Studio 2 at The London Studios, South Bank, London.

Writer Jonathan Harvey appeared in three episodes: as a guest at the series 1 wedding, once as make-up artist Louis, and then as a customer in a sofa store.

== Episodes ==
Gimme Gimme Gimme has broadcast three series and 19 episodes in total. The first series premiered on BBC Two on 8 January 1999 and lasted for six episodes, concluding on 12 February 1999. Following this, a Millennium special was screened at the end of the year on 29 December 1999. A second series commenced on 14 January 2000 and finished on 18 February 2000, again including six episodes. A short sketch included as part of Comic Relief was broadcast on 16 March 2001. Due to the high viewing figures and success the show received, it was moved to BBC One for a six-episode third series which was the last. Each episode was written by Jonathan Harvey and directed by Liddy Oldroyd for the first two series and the special; the third series was directed by Tristram Shapeero.

== Reception ==
=== Ratings ===
Overview
| Series | Timeslot | Episodes | First aired | Last aired | Network | Rank | Avg. viewers (millions) |
|---|---|---|---|---|---|---|---|
| 1 | Friday 9:00 pm | 6 | 8 January 1999 | 12 February 1999 | BBC Two | 1 | 6.01 |
| 2 | Wednesday 9:00 pm (special); Friday 9:00 pm | 7 | 29 December 1999 | 18 February 2000 | BBC Two | 2 | 6.62 |
| 3 | Friday 9:30 pm | 6 | 2 November 2001 | 14 December 2001 | BBC One | N/A | N/A |

Series 1
| No. | Title | Air date | Ratings | |
| No. | Title | Air date | Viewers | Rank |
|---|---|---|---|---|
| 1 | "Who's That Boy" | 8 January 1999 | 6,550,000 | 1 |
| 2 | "The Big Break" | 15 January 1999 | 6,290,000 | 1 |
| 3 | "Legs and Co." | 22 January 1999 | 5,950,000 | 1 |
| 4 | "Do They Take Sugar?" | 29 January 1999 | 6,100,000 | 1 |
| 5 | "Saturday Night Diva" | 5 February 1999 | 5,840,000 | 2 |
| 6 | "I Do, I Do, I Do" | 12 February 1999 | 5,350,000 | 2 |
Series 2
| No. | Title | Air date | Ratings | |
| No. | Title | Air date | Viewers | Rank |
| S | "Millennium" | 29 December 1999 | 3,980,000 | 3 |
| 1 | "Teacher's Pet" | 14 January 2000 | 6,790,000 | 1 |
| 2 | "Stiff" | 21 January 2000 | 5,420,000 | 3 |
| 3 | "Prison Visitor" | 28 January 2000 | 5,570,000 | 2 |
| 4 | "Dirty 30" | 4 February 2000 | 6,160,000 | 1 |
| 5 | "Glad to be Gay?" | 11 February 2000 | 4,720,000 | 2 |
| 6 | "Sofa Man" | 18 February 2000 | 7,100,000 | 1 |
Series 3
| No. | Title | Air date | Ratings | |
| No. | Title | Air date | Viewers | Rank |
| 1 | "Down and Out" | 2 November 2001 | 6,790,000 | 22 |
| 2 | "Lollipop Man" | 9 November 2001 | <6,150,000 | —N/a |
| 3 | "Secrets and Flies" | 23 November 2001 | <5,830,000 | —N/a |
| 4 | "Trauma" | 30 November 2001 | <5,960,000 | —N/a |
| 5 | "Singing in the Drain" | 7 December 2001 | <5,920,000 | —N/a |
| 6 | "Decoy" | 14 December 2001 | <5,550,000 | —N/a |

=== Awards and nominations ===
| Year | Award Show | Category | Recipient(s) | Result | Ref(s) |
|---|---|---|---|---|---|
| 1999 | British Comedy Awards | Best TV Comedy Actress | Kathy Burke | Nominated | |
| 1999 | British Comedy Awards | Best TV Sitcom | Gimme Gimme Gimme | Nominated | |
| 2000 | British Comedy Awards | Best TV Comedy Actress | Kathy Burke | Nominated | |
| 2001 | BAFTA TV Awards | Best Comedy Performance | Kathy Burke | Nominated | |
| 2002 | BAFTA TV Awards | Best Comedy Performance | Kathy Burke | Nominated | |
| 2002 | BAFTA TV Awards | Best Scripted Comedy | Francis Matthews; Tristram Shapeero; Jonathan Harvey | Nominated | |
| 2002 | British Comedy Awards | Best TV Comedy Actress | Kathy Burke | Won | |
| 2002 | National Television Awards | Most Popular Comedy Performer | Kathy Burke | Nominated | |

== Home media ==
Gimme Gimme Gimme' has been released entirely on VHS and DVD on Region 2 in the United Kingdom via Video Vision Ltd. and Universal Home Entertainment. Each series were released as individual sets and a complete collection. The original DVD sets were made available on the same days as the VHS sets. On Region 4 in Australia, where only the first two series are available, the sets have identical content to the UK releases. The series was re-released on Region 2 DVD under Universal's subsidiary, Universal Playback.

| Series | Release date | | | Features |
| Series | VHS & Region 2 | Region 2 (reissue) | Region 4 | Features |
|---|---|---|---|---|
| The Complete First Series | 1 October 2001 | 30 April 2007 | 22 April 2003 | 6 episodes; 1 disc; 14:9 aspect ratio; No subtitles; BBFC: 15; IFCO: 15; ACB: M; No special features |
| The Complete Second Series | 17 November 2003 | 27 August 2007 | 3 June 2009 | Millennium special & 6 episodes; 1 disc; 16:9 aspect ratio; No subtitles; BBFC: 15; IFCO: 15; ACB: M; No special features |
| The Complete Third Series | 11 November 2002 | 27 August 2007 | —N/a | 6 episodes; 1 disc; 16:9 aspect ratio; No subtitles; BBFC: 15; IFCO: 18; No special features; The Region 2 reissued DVD was released again in a slimline set on 14 November 2011. |
| The Complete Collection | 17 November 2003 | 13 November 2006 | —N/a | 18 episodes & Millennium special; 3 disc; 14:9 aspect ratio (Series 1); 16:9 aspect ratio (Series 2 & 3); No subtitles; BBFC: 15; IFCO: 18; No special features |

From November 2020, the entire series was made available on BBC iPlayer for one year. In December 2022, it became available to stream on BritBox.
