= Lollipop Man =

A lollipop man (or crossing guard) helps pedestrians to cross busy roads.

Lollipop Man may also refer to:

- Lollipop man (motorsport), a member of the pit crew
- "Lollipop Man" (Gimme Gimme Gimme), a 2001 television episode
- "Lollipop Man" (Not Going Out), a 2018 television episode
