= Blue Money (1985 film) =

British TV film

- Written by: Stewart Parker
- Directed by: Colin Bucksey
- Starring: Tim Curry; Debby Bishop; Billy Connolly
- Music by: Richard Hartley
- Country of origin: United Kingdom
- Original language: English

Production
- Producers: Jo Apted; June Roberts
- Cinematography: Peter Jessop
- Editor: Jon Costelloe
- Running time: 82 minutes
- Production company: London Weekend Television

Original release
- Network: ITV
- Release: March 1985

Blue Money is a 1985 English television comedy film written by Stewart Parker, directed by Colin Bucksey and starring Tim Curry, Debby Bishop and Billy Connolly.

== Plot ==
A taxi driver and aspiring actor-singer Larry Gormley (Tim Curry) becomes entangled with gangsters when he steals a briefcase full of money that was left behind in his cab.

== Cast ==
- Tim Curry as Larry Gormley
- Debby Bishop as Pam Hodge
- Billy Connolly as Des
- Frances Tomelty as Fidelma
- George Irving as Ramirez

== Production ==
The film was written by Parker specifically for Curry to showcase his mimicry and singing skills as he covers songs and impersonates many musicians throughout the film, including Mick Jagger and Billie Holiday.
