= Scrubbers =

1982 British drama film

- DVD cover
- Directed by: Mai Zetterling
- Written by: Mai Zetterling; Susannah Buxton; Roy Minton; Jeremy Watt
- Produced by: Don Boyd
- Starring: Amanda York; Chrissie Cotterill; Kathy Burke
- Distributed by: HandMade Films
- Release date: 24 September 1982; (UK)
- Running time: 90 minutes
- Country: United Kingdom
- Language: English
- Budget: £600,000

Scrubbers is a 1982 British drama film directed by Mai Zetterling and produced by Don Boyd starring Amanda York, Kathy Burke (in her professional acting debut) and Chrissie Cotterill. It was shot primarily in Virginia Water, Surrey, England. It was inspired by the success of the 1979 film Scum.

A novel based on the film, and also entitled Scrubbers, was written by Alexis Lykiard and published in London by W. H. Allen & Co. in 1982.

== Plot ==
Two girls escape from an open borstal. Annetta wants to visit her baby daughter who is being raised in a convent. Carol plans to be recaptured and sent to the closed borstal where her girlfriend Doreen is being held. Carol's plan works, but she is devastated to find that Doreen has a new girlfriend. Doreen and the girlfriend taunt Carol. Annetta is arrested at the convent and sent to the same closed borstal. She assumes Carol informed on her and proceeds to plan her revenge. Inmate Eddie professes her love for Carol and offers protection, so Carol begins a relationship with her. Annetta's constant bullying attempts keep her in solitary confinement. When Eddie is released Carol loses her protection and Annetta plans another attack.

== Cast ==
- Amanda York – Carol Howden
- Chrissie Cotterill – Annetta Brady
- Elizabeth Edmonds – Kathleen
- Kate Ingram – Eddie
- Amanda Symonds – Mac
- Kathy Burke – Glennis
- Debby Bishop – Doreen
- Eva Mottley – Pam
- Imogen Bain – Sandy
- Honey Bane – Molly
- Camille Davis – Sharon
- Rachael Weaver – Gwen
- Dana Gillespie – Budd
- Pauline Melville – Crow
- Pam St Clement – Strapper
- Miriam Margolyes – Jones
- Jackie Holborough – Daly
- Brian Croucher – Leo
- Tim Kightley – Dr. Siles
- Robbie Coltrane – Puff Guts
- Ken Shorter – Rex

== Production ==
The film was based on a script by Roy Minton who had also written Scum. The film version of Scum was produced by Don Boyd who in April 1980 announced he would make Scrubbers as part of a slate of eight movies with a total budget of £9 million. Boyd went on to make Honky Tonk Freeway but in June 1981 announced he intended to make Scrubbers with Mai Zetterling as director. Michael Relph, a production executive for Boyd, said the film would be "more emotional than violent."

Zetterling said she agreed to make the film "only if I could rewrite the script to put less stress on lesbian relationships... The original script for Scrubbers was Peeping Tom stuff." Zetterling claimed she "did a lot of work on" the script "developing different types of character. There were also certain scenes that were too reminiscent of Scum and we took them out. This film should not be a sequel though people will inevitably call it that anyway."

Chrissie Cotterill said the cast and Zetterling hated the title "Scrubbers". Boyd insisted the title remain though "our approach in advertising will be to minimise the pejorative effect of the word."

Filming took place in March 1982 with finance coming from HandMade Films. Zetterling wrote in her memoir that she "felt very strongly and passionately about the making of" the film, adding:

My own headline for the movie was one word... compassion. It took me months to do the fieldwork in order to get the documentation that I wanted, the knowledge and hundreds of girls passed in front of my video camera before I found my loyal group of thirty unknowns. We had a week of rehearsals in a Victorian mental hospital in Virginia Water, where we also filmed: no studios for me. The walls had their lived-in pain and the corridors were long and aching... The work... sometimes was hell on roller-skates, as I could be doing up to twenty-five set-ups in one day, the crew running after me.

Minton was unhappy with the final film, complaining that his screenplay had been “savaged” and the production was “arguably the worst film ever made”.

== Reception ==
=== Box office ===
In April 1983 Denis O'Brien of HandMade Films called it "an intelligent film. But it may be the first one where we do not get our money back. However it only cost us £556,000." In December 1983 O'Brien said he expected the film to be profitable.

=== Critical ===
Michael Palin saw the film at the London Film Festival in November 1982. He wrote about it in his diary:

Scrubbers turns out to be a well-made film with superb and convincing performances from the girls. Mai Zetterling has succeeded in giving flesh and blood to characters who are normally regarded as ‘beyond society’. The only problem I had is that the depiction of prison life has been done so often and so well recently in a series of documentaries. So, in Scrubbers there were many moments when I felt myself caught up in cliche — the stock psychiatrist, the hard governor, the keys in locks, the clang of doors. But the girls were Mai Zetterling originals, and were the heart and soul of the bleak, gloomy, violent picture.

The Evening Standard called it "pure soap opera". "The film never transcends some rather simplistic limitations." wrote The Guardian. The Observer called it "a decent, not dishonourable little picture."

The film was released in the US in 1984.
