= Running Scared (TV series) =

- TV tie-in cover
- Genre: Crime drama
- Written by: Bernard Ashley
- Directed by: Marilyn Fox
- Starring: Julia Millbank; Christopher Ellison; Hetty Baynes; James Cosmo; Amarjit Dhillon; Renu Setna
- Country of origin: United Kingdom
- Original language: English
- No. of series: 1
- No. of episodes: 6

Production
- Executive producer: Paul Stone
- Running time: 25 minutes
- Production company: BBC Studios

Original release
- Network: BBC1
- Release: 15 January – 19 February 1986

Running Scared is a six-part British television children's drama series, transmitted between 15 January and 19 February 1986, that was based on the Bernard Ashley novel of the same name.

The series, primarily set in Forest Gate, focuses on a teenage girl, Paula Prescott (Julia Millbank), whose life is put at risk when she uncovers evidence that could put a local criminal gang leader Charlie Elkin (Christopher Ellison) behind bars. The series was filmed in and around Green Lane in Dagenham; Queen's Market in Upton Park; First Avenue in Manor Park; and The Greyhound public house in Warley, Essex. The Woolwich Ferry also features in a key scene.

The series was notable for its use of the Kate Bush single Running Up That Hill (A Deal with God) being used as the main title theme, and part of the original video being re-imagined for use within the programme's title sequence. Another notable track used for the series was "Chemistry" by Brian Eno and Jon Hassell from their 1980 collaboration Fourth World, Vol. 1: Possible Musics.

Creator Ashley used the story to highlight the ever-growing Sikh community in London, which had been rarely touched upon in mainstream television up to this point. A TV-tie in version of the novel was issued a week prior to broadcast on 9 January 1986. A digitally remastered version of the series was released on DVD in Australia in 2014.

== Cast ==
- Julia Millbank as Paula Prescott
- Christopher Ellison as Charlie Elkin
- Hetty Baynes as Leila
- James Cosmo as Detective Inspector McNeill
- Amarjit Dhillon as Narinder Sidhu
- Renu Setna as Pratap Singh Sidhu
- Rani Singh as Kamal Kaur Sidhu
- Desmond McNamara as Mick Prescott
- Maureen Sweeney as Dolly Prescott
- Tony Caunter as Frank Butler
- Alan Ford as Ron Martin
- Alan Talbot as Fred Barratt
- Simon Adams as Brian Butler
- Jason Norman as Tommy
- Damon Doyle as Scott
- Anthony Gorry as Dean Prescott
- Fred Bryant as Sam "Grandad" Prescott

== Episodes ==
No.	Title	Directed by	Written by	Original release date	U.K. viewers (millions)
1	"Episode 1"	Marilyn Fox	Bernard Ashley	15 January 1986	N/A
Paula Prescott, a teenage girl whose recently founded obsession with boys and finding space for Wham posters on her wall, finds herself caught up with East End villain Charlie Elkin, a keen golfer and 'respectable' club owner, after discovering that her late grandfather has hidden a vital piece of evidence – one half of a pair of spectacles – that could put Elkin behind bars for many years to come, much to the pleasure of local detective McNeill. A note left to Paula reveals the location of the evidence to be an old musical box – the chase is then on to decipher the secrets of the box, particularly as the family of Paula's best friend, Narinder, are being terrorised by Elkin's gang.
2	"Episode 2"	Marilyn Fox	Bernard Ashley	22 January 1986	N/A
Elkin is desperate to recover the evidence which could put him in jail. His threats are destroying not only Paula's family, but her friendship with Narinder as well.
3	"Episode 3"	Marilyn Fox	Bernard Ashley	29 January 1986	N/A
Narinder finds that she is divided from Paula and from her own family, and Elkin is the root of all their problems.
4	"Episode 4"	Marilyn Fox	Bernard Ashley	5 February 1986	N/A
Paula begins to unravel the clue left by her grandfather, and hopes it will prevent Narinder's family going back to India.
5	"Episode 5"	Marilyn Fox	Bernard Ashley	12 February 1986	N/A
Elkin increases his pressure on Paula, and she realises that none of her family can help her.
6	"Episode 6"	Marilyn Fox	Bernard Ashley	19 February 1986	N/A
Paula must now make the unbearable choice between her family and Narinder.
