= My Hero (British TV series) =

British TV superhero sitcom (2000–2006)

- Genre: Superhero; Sitcom; Science fiction
- Created by: Paul Mendelson
- Written by: Paul Mayhew-Archer; Paul Mendelson; Paul Alexander; Simon Braithwaite; Gary Lawson; John Phelps; Ian Brown; James Hendrie; James Cary; Trevelyan Evans; Pete Sinclair; Daniel Peak; Andrea Solomons; Katie Douglas; Jon Brown
- Directed by: John Stroud
- Starring: Ardal O'Hanlon; Emily Joyce; Hugh Dennis; Geraldine McNulty; Lou Hirsch; Philip Whitchurch; Lill Roughley; Tim Wylton; James Dreyfus
- Opening theme: "My Hero" Theme
- Ending theme: "My Hero" Theme
- Composer: Philip Pope
- Country of origin: United Kingdom
- Original language: English
- No. of series: 6
- No. of episodes: 51 (+ 1 short) (list of episodes)

Production
- Executive producers: Geoffrey Perkins; Marcus Mortimer; Sophie Clarke-Jervoise
- Producers: John Stroud; Jamie Rix
- Editors: Mykola Pawluk; Graham Hutchings
- Camera setup: Multiple-camera setup
- Running time: 30 minutes
- Production company: Big Bear Films

Original release
- Network: BBC One
- Release: 4 February 2000 – 10 September 2006

My Hero is a British television superhero sitcom, created by Paul Mendelson, and produced for the BBC between 2000 and 2006. The series follows the exploits of an alien superhero known as "Thermoman" – a multi-powered superhero who originates from the planet Ultron – during his time between missions after falling in love with a British nurse he rescued. Although incredibly intelligent amongst his kind, Thermoman is unfamiliar with human life, which not only leads others to consider him dim-witted and idiotic, but also causes problems due to his many misunderstandings.

The main role of Thermoman was portrayed by Ardal O'Hanlon up until 2005, before he was replaced by James Dreyfus for the final series. The cast itself remained largely unchanged throughout its broadcast history, and included Emily Joyce, Lill Roughley, Tim Wylton, Lou Hirsch, Hugh Dennis, Geraldine McNulty, and Philip Whitchurch. Unlike most British sitcoms, Mendelson co-wrote episode scripts with a large team of writers. Each series also featured a varying number of episodes, with the first and second series containing six episodes, series three through five containing 10 episodes each and series six containing eight episodes, with a Christmas Special for 2000, and a Comic Relief short special in 2001.

Despite its viewing figures going into decline by the time of Dreyfus' appearance, the show remained a regular feature on British television, being regularly repeated on Gold in the United Kingdom. In the United States, the series was shown on PBS and, briefly, BBC America. In Australia, UKTV offered repeats of the first three series, while BBC Entertainment provided repeats for Scandinavia. Three of the six series have been released on DVD; two on Region 1 DVD and one on Region 2. The first three series were added to BBC iPlayer in 2026.

== Premise ==
The series focuses on the life of George Sunday, a man who comes off as idiotic, but who in reality is a superhero from the planet Ultron known as "Thermoman", who serves to safeguard humanity and the Earth, and Janet Dawkins, a British nurse who works at a local surgery in the town of Northolt, whom George falls in love with after saving her life. The series focuses on the couple's efforts to cope with numerous problems that occur to them during their relationship, including dealing with Janet's obnoxius parents and the self-centered doctor whom she works for, and George's many misunderstandings of human culture, societial values and traits.

After the second series, the writers added in additional elements surrounding the couple being married and having children of Ultronian origin – capable of speech, intelligence and super powers for their infant age – and coping with issues surrounding their family lives. In the sixth series, George loses his old body, and replaces it with a new one that he gives the alias of George Monday, taking up work as a doctor alongside Piers at his surgery.

== Cast ==
George Monday, as portrayed by James Dreyfus

Janet Dawkins, as portrayed by Emily Joyce

- Ardal O'Hanlon as George Sunday AKA "Thermoman" (Series 1–5) – A dim-witted superhero, intelligent on alien matters, but completely unable to understand human society and values.
- James Dreyfus as George Monday AKA "Thermoman" (Series 6) – George's new alias after losing his old one due to financial troubles, who shows some intelligence but is still misunderstanding human culture.
- Emily Joyce as Janet Dawkins – A British nurse and George's lover, who often struggles with the alien aspects of his life and people.
- Lill Roughley as Ella Dawkins – Janet's obnoxious mother.
- Tim Wylton as Stanley Dawkins – Janet's mildly obnoxious father.
- Lou Hirsch as Arnie Kowalski – George's cousin, and a former superhero who was stripped of his powers for abusing them. Initially written to living in the US, the third series saw writers relocate him to Northolt and develop a relationship with Mrs. Raven.
- Hugh Dennis as Dr. Piers Crispin – A self-centred, pompous TV doctor who runs his own surgery in Northolt and regularly looks for ways to increase his fame and popularity.
- Geraldine McNulty as Mrs. Raven – Piers' surgery receptionist, a vindictive, sadistic woman with a cruel liking for basking in other people's misery.
- Philip Whitchurch as Tyler – George and Janet's next-door neighbour, who suffers delusions and hallucinations that cause him to mix up fictional elements, most from science-fiction, fantasy and conspiracy theories, with real-life. He is the only one to know of George's real identity. After the first series, the writers gave him more prominence, including being George's assistant at his shop.
- Moya Brady as Avril (Series 1) – George's assistant in his shop. The character was written out after the first series.
- Pat Kelman as the Ultron Postie (Series 3–6) – Ultronian postman who delivers correspondence to George on Earth
- Finlay Stroud as Apollo "Ollie" Sunday (Series 2–6) – George and Janet's son. He is highly intelligent in human life, compared to his father, with his superpowers.
- Madeline Mortimer as Cassandra "Cassie" Sunday (series 5–6) – George and Janet's daughter, highly intelligent, possessing the power of premonition and foresight.

== Episodes ==
Series	Episodes	Originally released	
Series	Episodes	First released	Last released
1	7	4 February 2000	22 December 2000
2	6	14 May 2001	18 June 2001
3	10	7 June 2002	23 August 2002
4	10	8 August 2003	10 October 2003
5	10	7 January 2005	25 March 2005
6	8	21 July 2006	10 September 2006

== Home media ==
In the United States, the series has been released on DVD via BBC Video; "Season One" was released on 16 January 2007, while "Season Two" was released on 7 August 2007. The sets are now currently out-of-print and no subsequent seasons have been made available on region 1.

In the United Kingdom, Series Three was the only series to receive a home video release. The "Complete Series 3" was released on VHS on 7 October 2002 via IMC Vision, while two DVD sets, "Volume 1" (episodes 1–5 of Series 3), and "Volume 2" (episodes 6–10 of Series 3) were also released on 7 October 2002. A DVD set containing "Complete Series 3" was additionally made available from IMC Vision on 14 May 2012.

As of 2024, it has not been announced whether My Hero will receive any subsequent series releases, or a complete series box set.

Series one and two of My Hero became available to stream in the UK via BritBox from 10 March 2022. Series 3 and 4 were added to BritBox via ITVX as of 18 February 2024. The first three series were added to BBC iPlayer on 3 August 2026, presented in their original 16:9 aspect ratio.

== Reception ==
My Hero was Ardal O'Hanlon's first sitcom since the conclusion of Father Ted in 1998. The Guardian writer Mark Lawson considered My Hero to have an inferior concept to Father Ted, as the older sitcom involved humans in a surreal Ireland, while he believed the jokes in My Hero were superhero clichés. Stuart Jeffries in the same publication praised the supporting characters, especially Mrs Raven and Tyler. Ahead of the fourth series in 2003, Jonathan Wright of The Guardian referred to My Hero as "A variation on the domestic sitcom that's self-consciously lightweight and silly, but often much loved by younger members of the household". The final series in 2006, in which James Dreyfus replaced O'Hanlon, received damning reviews in the Lancashire Telegraph and the Warrington Guardian.

The first episode of My Hero on 4 February 2000 received an audience of 7.13 million, the third biggest audience on BBC One that day after Neighbours and a repeat of Only Fools and Horses, and 23rd highest of the week. The show's highest audience was on 18 June 2001 for the last episode of the second series, for which 9.17 million people watched George marry Janet; it was BBC One's fourth biggest audience of the week.

In 2002, the Broadcasting Standards Commission upheld seven complaints about the use of the word "bastard" in three My Hero episodes broadcast before the 9 pm watershed.

== See also ==
- Mork & Mindy
