= Widows (TV series) =

British television crime drama series (1983–1985)

- DVD cover of Series One and Two
- Created by: Lynda La Plante
- Starring: Ann Mitchell; Fiona Hendley; Maureen O'Farrell; Eva Mottley; Debby Bishop; Maurice O'Connell; David Calder; Kate Williams; Paul Jesson
- Country of origin: United Kingdom
- Original language: English
- No. of series: 2
- No. of episodes: 12

Production
- Running time: 50 minutes
- Production company: Euston Films for Thames Television

Original release
- Network: ITV
- Release: 16 March 1983 – 8 May 1985

Related
- She's Out

Widows is a British primetime television crime drama that was broadcast in 1983 and 1985, produced by Euston Films for Thames Television and aired on the ITV network. Two six-part series were written by crime writer Lynda La Plante. The executive producer for the series was Verity Lambert. In 1984 it was nominated for the British Academy Television Award for Best Drama Series or Serial.

== Plot ==
Three armed robbers — Harry Rawlins, Terry Miller, and Joe Perelli — are killed during an armed robbery. They are survived by their widows, Dolly Rawlins (Ann Mitchell), Shirley Miller (Fiona Hendley), and Linda Perelli (Maureen O'Farrell). With the police applying pressure, and a rival gang intending to take over Harry Rawlins' crime business, the widows turn to Dolly for leadership.

She uses Harry's famous "ledgers", a cache of books detailing all his robberies over the years, to find the details of the failed robbery, and, enlisting the help of a fourth woman, Bella O'Reilly (Eva Mottley), they resolve to pull off the raid themselves. At the same time, they discover the "fourth man" in the raid escaped—leaving their husbands for dead. Dolly must contend with the police and the gang, as well as her fellow widows, agitating for vengeance.

The first series of Widows concluded with the widows pulling off the raid, and escaping to Rio. In the final scenes, they discovered that the "fourth man" was in fact Harry Rawlins (Maurice O'Connell), Dolly's husband.

A second series followed in 1985. This series saw the widows return from Rio to track down Harry Rawlins, revealed at the conclusion of the original Widows to be the surviving "fourth man" from the original raid. Harry is determined to pay back the widows for staging his raid, and the widows have a score to settle with him for running out on their husbands.

Actress Eva Mottley left the production before the second series, claiming that she had been sexually and racially abused by the production staff. She died by suicide soon after. Debby Bishop took over the role of Bella for series 2.

A sequel series, She's Out, set ten years after the events of Widows, was produced in 1995.

== Cast ==
=== Major cast ===
- Ann Mitchell as Dolly Rawlins
- Maureen O'Farrell as Linda Perelli
- Fiona Hendley as Shirley Miller
- Eva Mottley as Bella O'Reilly (Series 1)
- Debby Bishop as Bella O'Reilly (Series 2)
- Kate Williams as Audrey Withey
- Maurice O'Connell as Harry Rawlins
- David Calder as D.I. George Resnick
- Paul Jesson as D.S./D.I. Alec Fuller

=== Supporting cast ===
==== Series 1 ====
- Peter Machin as D.C. Robin Andrews
- Jeffrey Chiswick as Arnie Fisher
- George Costigan as Charlie Staincliffe
- Stanley Meadows as Eddie Rawlins
- Carol Gillies as Alice Gunner
- Dudley Sutton as Boxer Davis
- Terry Cowling as Jimmy Nunn
- Christopher Ellison as Tony Fisher
- Terence Harvey as Chief Insp. Saunders
- James Lister as Carlos Moreno
- Catherine Neilson as Trudie Nunn
- Peter Lovstrom as Greg Withey
- Michael John Paliotti as Joe Perelli
- Terry Stuart as Terry Miller

==== Series 2 ====
- Stephen Yardley as Vic Morgan
- Andrew Kazamia as Micky Tesco
- Peter Machin as D.C. Robin Andrews
- Mike Felix as Eddie Bates
- Peter Lovstrom as Greg Withey
- Christopher Whitehouse as Gordon Murphy
- Pavel Douglas as D.S. Tommy Reynolds
- Damien Thomas as Jose Camarena
- Jim Carter as D.I. Frinton
- Ann Michelle as Jackie Rawlins
- Terence Harvey as Chief Insp. Saunders
- Catherine Neilson as Trudie Nunn
- Winston Crooke as Harvey Rintle

== Episode list ==
=== Series 1 (1983) ===
No.	Title	Directed by	Written by	Original release date	Viewers (millions)
1	"Episode 1"	Ian Toynton	Lynda La Plante	16 March 1983	
One of Harry Rawlins' robberies goes wrong, resulting in the deaths of three of the robbers. Dolly is given some keys by Harry's cousin Eddie at Harry's funeral. The police begin a search for Harry's ledgers, in which he kept all his notes on past and future robberies, as do the Fisher brothers, who were rivals. Dolly finds the ledgers, along with a gun and money, in Harry's deposit box at the bank. The police follow Dolly around, but she gives them the slip a few times to meet up with Shirley and Linda, whose husbands also died in the explosion. They decide to carry out the robbery themselves. When Dolly returns home, she finds her house in a mess and someone in the living room.
2	"Episode 2"	Ian Toynton	Lynda La Plante	23 March 1983	
Dolly finds Boxer Davis, who is working for the Fisher brothers, in her house when she returns home. Shirley and Linda find cars to use, but neither vehicle seems to be much good. Linda goes to a garage to get it fixed and meets the owner, Carlos, who she begins a relationship with, much to Dolly's disgust. While Linda is at work, she bumps into an old friend, Bella, to whom she tells everything, and subsequently takes her to the headquarters, calling Dolly and Shirley to go there, but it takes a while to persuade Dolly.
3	"Episode 3"	Ian Toynton	Lynda La Plante	30 March 1983	
Dolly has told Boxer Davis that Harry is still alive to try to keep the Fisher brothers off their backs. Tony Fisher visits Eddie and tells him what Boxer Davis has been telling them. Later, Eddie visits Boxer and takes him out and gets him drunk, and then leaves him in a back alley - where a mysterious driver runs him down. Dolly, Linda, Bella and Shirley go up to the mountains to practice for the robbery - and an unexpected face returns from the dead.
4	"Episode 4"	Ian Toynton	Lynda La Plante	6 April 1983	
The plan gets underway as the vehicles and the strategy are sorted out. Dolly tells Linda about Carlos' relationship with Arnie Fisher, but she doesn't believe it at first. But when she sees Carlos with Arnie Fisher, she tips off the police and they are lying in wait for him the following morning. He makes a run for it, but is killed when he runs into a post van - making Linda feel guilty about calling the police. Detective Inspector Resnick is ordered to drop the investigation and furiously resigns. Dolly gets hold of the details of the security van, and they realise they will have to do it two weeks earlier. Linda and Bella display mistrust of Dolly and Harry turns up at the hideout.
5	"Episode 5"	Ian Toynton	Lynda La Plante	13 April 1983	
Linda gets the van for the robbery and the plan is ready to be carried out. The following day they carry out the robbery, and everything runs smoothly until Shirley twists her ankle when they are escaping from the scene of the robbery. Dolly later finds Shirley desperately trying to start her car, and takes her to her house. The police suddenly turn up at Dolly's house and take her to the station to identify photographs. Eddie turns up at Dolly's house while she's still with the police, but Shirley attacks him and he breaks Dolly's dog's neck in the struggle. Dolly returns home and is devastated at the death of her dog, but soon realises that they both need to get away as soon as possible, but first she hides the money in the top of the new lockers at the convent. Shirley recognises Eddie on a photograph - and Dolly realises that Harry is still alive.
6	"Episode 6"	Ian Toynton	Lynda La Plante	20 April 1983	
Dolly thinks up a plan to get rid of the watch on her house and get them safely out of the country. Shirley phones her mother and gets her to come to the house where Dolly tells her to put on a wig and a coat and drive out in Dolly's car, so that Eddie will follow her. Dolly and Shirley then drive off in Shirley's brother's car to the airport. Shirley asks a man to help her out because she thinks her luggage will be too heavy and gives him the money case. Meanwhile, Harry, Eddie and another man turn up at Dolly's house. While Harry and Eddie go in, the other man beats up D.I. Resnick, who is watching the house from his car. Dolly finds out on the plane that they would search anyone's bags at customs and they have to change their plan. The police arrive and arrest Eddie and the other man, but Harry escapes.

=== Series 2 (1985) ===
No.	Title	Directed by	Written by	Original release date	Viewers (millions)
1	"Episode 1"	Paul Annett	Lynda La Plante	3 April 1985	
It is six weeks after the robbery and Dolly has returned to England and is awaiting a face-lift. Back in Rio, Shirley is packing to go to Los Angeles and Bella has got engaged. Dolly gets a P.I. to watch Trudie Nunn, who Harry was living with before he left. Harry turns up in Rio to get money from his accounts there, but he finds that Dolly has cleaned out all his accounts. One night, Bella and her fiance take Linda out, but she keeps dropping hints at Bella's past and Bella sends her home. Harry is there and, in fear of her life, Linda tells him everything. Bella returns, runs into Harry and then finds Linda beaten up in the swimming pool.
2	"Episode 2"	Paul Annett	Lynda La Plante	10 April 1985	
Linda and Bella have an argument, and it is overheard by Bella's fiance and he hears everything about her past. Dolly receives a letter telling her about Harry, and she rushes to hide the money somewhere else. Harry arranges his return to England, as do Bella, Linda and Shirley. Harry is met by Mickey at the airport, who he tells to follow Linda and Bella. Harry then gets someone to go to them to find out where Dolly is, but he misses Linda and beats up the woman who is staying at Bella's. The widows meet up and decide to tell Harry that they are going to make a deal and give him £60,000 to leave them alone, but they secretly decide to call the police when they have given Harry the money.
3	"Episode 3"	Paul Annett	Lynda La Plante	17 April 1985	
Dolly, Bella, Shirley and Linda meet to go over the plan for the handover. Linda makes a dummy to use in her car and Micky fixes it for Shirley to join a modeling company. Shirley's mother tells her that she is pregnant, which takes Shirley's mind off the plan. Linda leaves and gets a gun, which Dolly has ordered her not to do. Dolly phones Harry and tells him where to meet her. When she is about to hand over the money, Linda and Bella arrive late and Harry rushes to leave, running Linda over and killing her. When Dolly finds out that Harry has killed Linda, she goes to his old house with the gun, but he isn't there. The P.I., Vic Morgan, arrives and finds her standing outside with the gun.
4	"Episode 4"	Paul Annett	Lynda La Plante	24 April 1985	
Vic Morgan goes to see D.I. Resnick at the hospital and tells him what he has found out so far. Bella tells Shirley that Linda is dead. Dolly and Bella find out that Harry is going to do another robbery when they go to the hideout to look for Dolly's book. Bella rents the lockup next door to keep an eye on how the robbery plan is progressing. Harry and Micky pay a visit to Arnie Fisher and get "permission" to use his club for a party. Morgan visits Dolly and asks her out to lunch and overhears her crying. The police catch up with Sunny, the fence for the money.
5	"Episode 5"	Paul Annett	Lynda La Plante	1 May 1985	
The party at the Fishers' club is used by Harry to get people involved in the robbery. The police turn up, but Micky pretends that they were invited to stop them ruining things. Shirley comes face to face with Harry on the stairs in the club. Morgan turns up at Dolly's house and takes her to his boat, which she doesn't like in the least. She ends up getting his coat overboard. Dolly and Bella find out that Shirley is working at Amanda's Night Club and when the robbery will take place. Dolly sends Morgan a new coat and Harry secures the plans for the robbery.
6	"Episode 6"	Paul Annett	Lynda La Plante	8 May 1985	
Dolly and Bella go to the lockup and find out that the robbery will be carried out earlier than they thought. They rush to phone the police and race to the club, but they are already there. They go in and hold up the staff and the models and take the jewellery. Shirley gets shot by Micky and he makes a run for it, but Dolly and Bella follow him and he is injured in a collision with a lorry - and is later shot by Harry. Bella leaves the country and Dolly hides the diamonds, but she's also got a surprise in store for Harry.

== In other media ==
=== American remake ===
In 2002, the first series was re-made for the American market, but the plot was significantly changed. Instead of a traditional armed robbery, this version united the three widows and the fourth woman in a plan to steal a famous painting. This version starred Mercedes Ruehl as Dolly Rawlins, Brooke Shields as Shirley Heller, Rosie Perez as Linda Perelli, and N'Bushe Wright as Bella O'Reilly. The miniseries aired on ABC between 6 August and 27 August 2002, and is produced by Patchett/Kaufman Entertainment, in association with Greengrass Productions and distributed by Buena Vista Television.

=== Film adaptation ===
Steve McQueen directed a film adaptation, and co-wrote the screenplay with Gillian Flynn. New Regency produce the film. In September 2016 Viola Davis was announced as starring as Dolly Rawlins. In January 2017, André Holland and Cynthia Erivo were announced as starring in the film. Elizabeth Debicki was in talks to join the film in February 2017. The same month, Michelle Rodriguez and Daniel Kaluuya were named among the cast. In March 2017, Liam Neeson was in discussions to star as Viola Davis' husband, and subsequently joined the cast. Robert Duvall joined the cast in April, as did Garret Dillahunt, Jacki Weaver, Manuel Garcia-Rulfo and Lukas Haas in May 2017. Carrie Coon was cast in June 2017, with Michael Harney and Jon Bernthal announced as cast members a month later. Principal photography began on 8 May 2017.

== Home media ==
The series was initially made available on VHS via Fremantle Home Entertainment; "Series One" was released on 13 May 2002, while "Series Two" was made available on 8 July 2002.

The Complete Series of Widows was released on DVD, first from Fremantle, on 19 April 2010, and again from Revelation Films, with the addition of the sequel series She's Out (which is included in all subsequent releases), then from Network on 5 November 2018.

On 5 November 2018, Network also released the complete series on standard definition Blu-ray.
