= Ewen Glass =

Irish playwright and screenwriter (born 1982)

Ewen Glass (born 25 December 1982) is a Northern Irish screenwriter and poet. Ewen first came to notice in the British film industry as the writer of Basement, a feature horror film starring Danny Dyer.

== Filmography ==
- Basement
- A Nurse Called Laura
- The Castle and The King
- Kamera
- We Saw Zebras
- Tough Love
