= Fiona Hendley =

British actress

Fiona Hendley (born 1959) is a British actress and latterly Christian speaker, married to the former Manfred Mann singer and actor Paul Jones.

== Career ==
=== Stage ===
She has appeared in a number of musical theatre productions. In 1982, she played Jenny Driver in A Beggar's Opera at the National Theatre having been part of the original cast of its highly successful production of Guys and Dolls. Both were directed by the Theatre's future artistic director Richard Eyre. She later played Bianca in Kiss Me Kate, opposite Jones, in the Royal Shakespeare Company's 1987 production.

She performed in the 1988 production of the play Woman Overboard at the Palace Theatre, Watford.

She played Mary Magdalene in a 1990 concert version of Jesus Christ Superstar at the Barbican Centre, London. In 1993, she appeared in the original production of the musical City of Angels.

=== Television ===
Hendley played Shirley in both series of Lynda La Plante's ITV television drama series Widows in 1983 and 1985. She played country singer Bebe McLintock in an episode of Boon in 1987.

== Personal life ==
Hendley was born in Surrey.

She and Jones both became Christians after being invited by Cliff Richard to a large-scale evangelistic event led by Luis Palau in the early 1980s.

The couple married on 15 December 1984 at Chelsea Register Office, before a blessing at All Souls Church, Langham Place.
