= Double Time (film) =

- Created by: Paul Dornan
- Written by: Paul Dornan
- Directed by: Audrey Cooke
- Starring: James Dreyfus; Michael Higgs
- Country of origin: United Kingdom

Production
- Executive producer: Clive Tulloh
- Producer: Mark Chapman
- Running time: 90 minutes
- Production company: Tiger Aspect Productions

Original release
- Network: ITV
- Release: 31 December 2007

Double Time was a British one-off comedy drama television film starring James Dreyfus. It received its premier in the United Kingdom on ITV at 9pm on Monday 31 December 2007. Its airing had been delayed since 2005 for unknown reasons.

== Plot ==
The plot centres on infamous criminal George McCabe, who is imprisoned following a botched diamond heist, and a struggling actor named Lawrence Nixon – both of whom are played by Dreyfus.

In his TV reconstruction of the robbery, Nixon, who bears a strong resemblance to McCabe, livens up his portrayal of the criminal by giving him a lisp and a camp walk. McCabe is rendered a laughing stock in prison as a result, and decides to exact his revenge on Nixon by arranging to escape, then for Nixon to take his place in jail. However, neither man can predict the life-changing consequences that McCabe's actions will have.

== Production ==
The prison set used in the film was the same one used for the television series Bad Girls, though it was repainted. The original title of the film was Mad Dog, which had to be changed during filming for legal reasons. The new title Double Time was suggested on set by the actor Ewen MacIntosh in between takes for a scene he was doing as one of the prison guards with the writer Paul Dornan.
