= Beth Goddard =

British actress

- Born: Elizabeth Jane Goddard; 31 March 1969 (age 57); Colchester, Essex, England, UK
- Occupation: Actress
- Years active: 1991–present
- Spouse: Philip Glenister (m. 2006)
- Children: 2

Elizabeth Jane Goddard (born 31 March 1969) is a British actress known for her role as Suze Littlewood in the BBC comedy series Gimme Gimme Gimme.

== Early life ==
Goddard grew up in Clacton-on-Sea, Essex, and attended Clacton County High School and the Rose Bruford College in Sidcup, Greater London, from 1986 to 1989.

== Career ==
One of Goddard's first television roles was as unscrupulous journalist Clare Moody in the 1994 episode "To Be a Somebody" of the ITV drama Cracker. She played Belinda Ashton in the ITV detective drama Lewis in 2008, and also starred as Suze Littlewood in the comedy Gimme Gimme Gimme. Goddard appeared alongside her husband Philip Glenister in the third series of BBC One drama Ashes to Ashes in 2010.

== Personal life ==
Goddard met her husband, Philip Glenister, best known for his role as Gene Hunt in TV drama Life on Mars, at a birthday party for Jamie Glover in 1997. They married in 2006. The couple have two daughters, Millie and Charlotte.

== Filmography ==
=== Film ===
Year	Title	Role	Notes
1994	A Business Affair	Student	
1996	Beautiful Thing	Brewery Official	
1999	The Last Seduction II	Murphy	
2008	Tu£sday	The Office / Helen	
2011	X-Men: First Class	Mrs. Xavier	
2013	Black Dog	Sue	Short film
2014	Edge of Tomorrow	Secretary / Judith	
2015	Queen of the Desert	Aunt Lascelles	
2016	A Street Cat Named Bob	Hilary	

=== Television ===
Year	Title	Role	Notes
1991	The Bill	Jenny Clerk	Episode: "Six of One"
1991	Performance	Waitress / Kit / Shona	Episode: "Top Girls"
1993	Agatha Christie's Poirot	Violet Wilson	Episode: "The Case of the Missing Will"
1993	Spender	Sally Prince	Episode: "Best Friends"
1993	The Bill	Susan Crossley	Episode: "Soft Touch"
1993–1995	Peak Practice	Leanda Sharpe	7 episodes
1994	Stages	Celia	Episode: "Low Level Panic"
1994	Cracker	Clare Moody	3 episodes: "To Be a Somebody: Parts 1–3"
1995	All Quiet on the Preston Front	Sara Polson	3 episodes
1995	Moving Story	Emma	Episode: "Superstition"
1995	The Perfect Match	Mandy	Television film
1995	Degrees of Error	Anna Peirce	4 episodes
1995	Medics	Dr. Jill Collier	2 episodes: "Living and Lying" and "Love Lies Bleeding"
1996	Roger Roger	Melanie	Television film (Pilot)
1996	Karaoke	Woman on Phone	Mini-series, Episode: "Tuesday"
1996	Ellington	Kelly Logan	6 episodes
1996	Bugs	Cassandra Newmann	3 episodes
1996	Drop the Dead Donkey	Julie	Episode: "George's Car"
1997	The Ruth Rendell Mysteries	Mirabel Davenport	Episode: "Thornapple"
1997	Sunnyside Farm	Wendy	6 episodes
1998	Roger Roger	Mel	Episode: "Some Get the Magic, Some Get the Tragic"
1999	Tilly Trotter	Ellen Ross	Mini-series, 2 episodes
1999	People Like Us		Episode: "The Head Teacher"
1999	The Scarlet Pimpernel	Suzanne De Tourney / Lady Suzanne Ffoulkes	3 episodes
1999–2000	A Touch of Frost	Helen Fox	2 episodes: "Line of Fire: Parts 1 & 2"
1999–2001	Big Bad World	Kath Shand	16 episodes
1999–2001	Gimme Gimme Gimme	Suze Littlewood	14 episodes
2000	Daylight Robbery	Harriet Howell	4 episodes
2001	Take Me	Kay Chambers	Mini-series, 6 episodes
2001	Arena	Queenie	Documentary. Episode: "According to Beryl"
2003	Midsomer Murders	Wendy Smythe-Webster	Episode: "A Tale of Two Hamlets"
2003	The Eustace Bros.	Melissa Garvey	6 episodes
2004	Murder in Suburbia	Sally Taylor	Episode: "A Good Deal of Attention"
2004	Frances Tuesday	Bishop	Television film
2006	Vital Signs	Maddy McCartney	4 episodes
2007	The Last Detective	Claire Symmons	Episode: "The Dead Peasants Society"
2007	The Sarah Jane Adventures	Sister Helena	2 episodes: "Eye of the Gorgon: Parts One & Two"
2008	Lewis	Belinda Ashton	Episode: "The Great and the Good"
2008	Agatha Christie's Poirot	Sister Agnieszka	Episode: "Appointment with Death"
2008	Crooked House	Mrs. Glanville	Mini-series, 2 episodes: "The Wainscoting" and "Omnibus"
2010	Ashes to Ashes	Elaine Downing	Episode: #3.2
2010	New Tricks	Paula Symes	Episode: "It Smells of Books"
2011	Midsomer Murders	Selina Stanton	Episode: "Dark Secrets"
2011	Casualty	Hannah Fleet	5 episodes
2013	Mad Dogs	Nina	Episode: #4.1
2014	The Smoke	Dolly	Mini-series, Episode: #1.4
2014	Endeavour	Barbara Batten	Episode: "Trove"
2015	Silent Witness	Trish Fallon	2 episodes: "One of Our Own: Parts 1 & 2"
2015	Cucumber	Claire Baxter	Mini-series, Episode: #1.5
2017	Outlander	Lady Louisa Dunsany	Episode: "Of Lost Things"
2018	Call the Midwife	Pamela Dobson	Episode: #7.5
2020	Des	Frances	Mini-series, Episode: #1.1
2021	Manhunt	DS Cathy Rook	4 episodes: "The Night Stalker: Parts 1–4"
2022	Becoming Elizabeth	Joan Denny	Episode: "Lighten Our Darkness"
2022	Doc Martin	Helen Parsons	Episode: "Love Will Set You Free"
2022	The Serpent Queen	Antoinette de Guise	5 episodes
2025	Code of Silence	Helen Redman	Reoccurring Role
