= Basement (2010 film) =

- Directed by: Asham Kamboj
- Written by: Ewen Glass
- Produced by: Ish Jalal; Asham Kamboj; Terry Stone
- Starring: Danny Dyer; Jimi Mistry; Emily Beecham
- Edited by: Peter Davies
- Production company: Gateway Films
- Distributed by: Revolver Entertainment
- Release date: 17 August 2010
- Running time: 77 minutes
- Country: United Kingdom
- Language: English

Basement is a 2010 British horror film, starring Danny Dyer and written by Ewen Glass about six friends who are lured into a basement for a sinister experiment.

== Plot ==
After returning from an anti-war demonstration, Gary (Danny Dyer), Sarah (Kierston Wareing), Saffron (Lois Winstone), Pru (Emily Beecham) and Derek (Jimi Mistry) stop in the country. Derek and Saffron discover a metal hatch in the middle of the forest, and they decide to explore inside. Gary, Pru and Sarah search for their missing friends and follow them into the hatch and find themselves locked in when it closes behind them.

== Production and release ==
Basement is the first feature film from Paperknife Productions; a company based at Pinewood studios. Terry Stone's Gateway Films is also involved in Basement's production. The film premiered at The May Fair on 17 August 2010 in London and was then released straight to DVD and Blu-ray on 23 August 2010.

== Reception ==
Critical reception for The Basement has been negative, with BeyondHollywood.com writing that the film could have been "enjoyable trash, though sadly its mind-numbing, soul-destroying lack of energy or originality drags it back down into the mire." HorrorNews.net called the film "poorly written", saying that "in general, it was just not a very good movie". Dread Central also reviewed the film, saying it was "an entertainment black hole. There isn’t a single line, performance, camera movement, idea, scene, shot, or piece of editing that warrants any kind of praise or attention."
