= Kathy Burke =

British actress and director (born 1964)

- Born: Katherine Lucy Bridget Burke; 13 June 1964 (age 62); Islington, London, England
- Occupations: Actress; comedian; writer; producer; director
- Years active: 1982–present
- Kathy Burke's voice on Desert Island Discs Desert Island Discs, BBC Radio 4, 15 August 2010

Katherine Lucy Bridget Burke (born 13 June 1964) is an English actress, director and comedian. She appeared in sketch shows such as French and Saunders (1988–1999), Harry Enfield's Television Programme (1990–1992), and Harry Enfield & Chums (1994–1998), and played a recurring role as Magda on the BBC sitcom Absolutely Fabulous (1992–2012). From 1999 to 2001, she starred as Linda La Hughes on the BBC sitcom Gimme Gimme Gimme, for which she received a British Comedy Award and two BAFTA nominations.

Burke made her film debut in the 1982 drama Scrubbers. For her portrayal of Valerie in the 1997 film Nil by Mouth, she won Best Actress at the Cannes Film Festival and was nominated for a BAFTA for Best Actress in a Leading Role. Her other film appearances include Sid and Nancy (1986), Dancing at Lughnasa (1998), Elizabeth (1998), This Year's Love (1999), Kevin & Perry Go Large (2000), The Martins (2001), Anita and Me (2002) and Once Upon a Time in the Midlands (2002). Having spent most of the 2000s concentrating on her work as a theatre director, she returned to film roles in the 2010s with Tinker Tailor Soldier Spy (2011), Pan (2015) and Absolutely Fabulous: The Movie (2016). Starting from 2019, Burke fronted a series of documentaries for Channel 4: Kathy Burke's All Woman (2019), Kathy Burke: Money Talks (2021) and Kathy Burke: Growing Up (2023).

== Early life ==
Burke was born at the Royal Free Hospital, London, on 13 June 1964, and was brought up in Islington, North London, by her Irish Catholic parents Paddy (from Galway) and Bridget (from Cork). She has two elder brothers. Her mother, known as Bridie, died of cancer when Burke was two years old. She lived with her father, a builder who was an alcoholic, and attended the Maria Fidelis Convent School, a secondary school in Euston, until she was 16 years old. She then studied at the Anna Scher Theatre School in Islington.

== Career ==
Burke's first role was in the 1982 film Scrubbers, directed by Swedish actress Mai Zetterling and featuring Pam St. Clement, Robbie Coltrane, Miriam Margolyes, Honey Bane, Debby Bishop and Eva Mottley. The film was set in a young offenders' institute for girls and was seen as a female version of the film Scum.

Burke appeared in a non-speaking role in a 1985 public information film about heroin addiction. The following year she appeared in a non-speaking role as 'witness in doorway' in an award-winning advert for The Guardian's 'Points of View'.

Burke first became familiar to television audiences as a player of minor roles in sketches by better-known performers such as Harry Enfield, Dawn French and Jennifer Saunders. Early TV work included regular appearances on the chat show The Last Resort hosted by Jonathan Ross on UK Channel 4 in the mid-1980s, playing the characters 'Tina Bishop' and "Perry the Pre-pubescent Schoolboy". Bishop was a continually pregnant "expert" offering advice on household chores, always with disastrous results. Both Perry and Tina (renamed "Waynetta Slob") later re-appeared as recurring sketch characters in Harry Enfield programmes. Along with French and Saunders, she has contributed to two Comic Relief charity singles. She first appeared as a member of Bananarama parody band Lananeeneenoonoo in 1989, and then as a member of Spice Girls look-alike band the Sugar Lumps in 1997.

In real life Burke was a big fan of Morrissey and appeared in the video for his 1989 single "Ouija Board, Ouija Board" and later in the 2002 Channel 4 documentary The Importance of Being Morrissey. On the 7 November 2023 episode of her Where There's a Will There's a Wake podcast, with Dolly Alderton as her guest, Burke commented "We don't like Morrissey anymore...because he's a racist wanker". Alderton shared Burke's disappointment with Morrissey's views with Burke adding "We idolise these people...but then people are three-dimensional and you get to know what they really think about life and it's just always a disappointment."

She became successful in her own right and although mainly associated with comedy, she has played several serious roles including that of Queen Mary Tudor in the film Elizabeth, which was released in 1998.

In 1994 Burke was awarded the Royal Television Society Award for Best Actress, for her performance as the mute Martha in the 1993 BBC TV series Mr. Wroe's Virgins. The series was directed by Danny Boyle and is based on Jane Rogers' book about John Wroe.

Burke won the Best Actress award at the 1997 Cannes Film Festival for her role in the gritty drama Nil by Mouth. Burke was so convinced she would not win that she made no plans to attend the ceremony; when told shortly beforehand she had won, she found her passport was out of date. The film also earned her a BAFTA nomination for Best Actress in a Leading Role. From 1999 to 2001 she appeared as Linda La Hughes in the BBC TV series Gimme Gimme Gimme (which she developed with writer Jonathan Harvey) where she was nominated for three British Comedy Awards (winning one), two BAFTA TV Awards and a National Television Award for her performance. In 2000, she appeared in the cult film Love Honour and Obey with Ray Burdis, and as Perry in the comedy film Kevin & Perry Go Large.

In 2003, she was listed in The Observer as one of the 50 funniest acts in British comedy.

Beginning in 2001, she stopped acting and began theatre directing, something she considers to be one of her true passions. She said in an interview with Dawn French in Dawn French's Girls Who Do Comedy that she no longer felt the same creative energy associated with acting that she used to have (she described it as a "feeling in my belly") and that for this reason she had stopped acting. However, since then, she has done some voice-over work, including UK TV adverts for Ski yoghurt (2005) and the voice of Rita's mum in the animated film Flushed Away (2006). She also appeared in the 2007 Christmas Special of The Catherine Tate Show as Nan's daughter Diane.

In February 1990, she wrote and directed Mr Thomas at the Old Red Lion Theatre. It was filmed and shown on Channel 4 the next year.

In 2007, Burke contracted Clostridioides difficile while in hospital for an operation, resulting in her having to pass directing duties on Dying for It at the Almeida Theatre (which starred Charlie Condou and Sophie Stanton who she worked with on Gimme Gimme Gimme).

In 2009, Burke made her television directorial debut with the BBC Three sketch show series Horne & Corden, starring Mathew Horne and James Corden.

Burke wrote and appeared as a nun in the short autobiographical film "Better Than Christmas" for Sky 1's Little Crackers, a collection of comic shorts that aired in December 2010. On 19 January 2012, it was announced that Burke had written her first TV series; her short for Little Crackers had led to the four-part series "Walking and Talking", based on her teenage years. Burke appeared as a nun in each episode of the series, which aired in the summer of 2012 on Sky Atlantic.

In 2011, Burke played Connie Sachs in the film adaptation of the novel Tinker, Tailor, Soldier, Spy. She was long-listed for a BAFTA nomination for her performance as Supporting Actress in 2012.

Burke appeared in the 2015 Peter Pan prequel film Pan, as Mother Barnabas. In November 2015, Burke presented the BBC topical news panel show Have I Got News for You.

In 2019, Burke starred in her own self-titled three-part documentary Kathy Burke's All Woman. The programme aired on Channel 4 and focused on the stereotypes and expectations of modern women. Burke touched on subjects such as marriage, pregnancy and cosmetic surgery.

In 2021, Burke appeared as a guest judge in series 3 of RuPaul's Drag Race UK.

Burke directed ITV's four-part murder mystery series Holding, which premiered on 14 March 2022 and is based on Graham Norton's novel of the same name.

In 2022, Burke started a podcast called Where There's a Will, There's a Wake. In the podcast Burke talks a guest through how the guest believes (or hopes) they will die and what they want to be done for their funeral. Notable guests have been Jennifer Saunders, Dawn French, Emerald Fennell and Steve McQueen. The podcast is produced by Sony Music Entertainment.

Burke published a memoir, A Mind of My Own, in October 2025, which received positive reviews.

== Filmography ==
=== Film ===
Year	Title	Role	Notes
1982	Scrubbers	Glennis	
1986	Sid and Nancy	Brenda Windzor	
1987	Straight to Hell	Sabrina	
1987	Walker	Annie Mae	
1987	Two of Us	Vera	
1989	Work Experience	Sally	
1997	Nil by Mouth	Valerie	
1998	Elizabeth	Queen Mary Tudor	
1998	Dancing at Lughnasa	Maggie Mundy	
1999	This Year's Love	Marey	
2000	Love, Honour and Obey	Kathy	
2000	Kevin & Perry Go Large	Perry	
2001	The Martins	Angie	
2002	Anita and Me	Deirdre Rutter	
2002	Once Upon a Time in the Midlands	Carol	
2006	Flushed Away	Rita's Mum	Voice
2011	Tinker Tailor Soldier Spy	Connie Sachs	
2011	The Antics Roadshow	Narrator	
2015	Pan	Mother Barnabas	
2016	Absolutely Fabulous: The Movie	Magda	
2022	The Sea Beast	Gwen Batterbie	Voice
2024	Blitz	Beryl	

=== Television ===
Year	Title	Role	Notes
1982	Educating Marmalade	School Kid	Episode: "Cringe Hill"
1983	Doctor Who	Lazar (uncredited)	Serial: "Terminus"
1983	Johnny Jarvis	Girl in Pub	Part 5: 1981-1982
1983-1987	Scene	Various	2 episodes
1984	The Brief	Shirley Daniel	Episode: "Look at Me"
1985	Bleak House	Guster	2 episodes
1986	A Very Peculiar Practice	Alice	Episode: "Catastrophe Theory"
1986	Ladies in Charge	Daisy	Episode: "A Public Mischief"
1986	Call Me Mister	Cleaner	Episode: "Longshot"
1988-1993	The Comic Strip Presents	Various	4 episodes
1988-1990	Screenplay	Voiceover/Lily	2 episodes
1988–1999	French and Saunders	Various	7 episodes
1989-1991	The Bill	Sherry Brooks/Wendy	2 episodes
1990	Set of Six	Tarquin's girlfriend	
1990–1992	Harry Enfield's Television Programme	Various	
1991	The Real McCoy	Various	1 episode
1991	Casualty	Lorraine McCullier	Episode: "Facing Up"
1991	Murder Most Horrid	Helen	Episode: "A Determined Woman"
1992-1994	The Fat Slags	Sandra	
1992–1996	Absolutely Fabulous	Magda	5 episodes
1993	Mr. Wroe's Virgins	Martha	Miniseries
1994	Screen Two	Debbie	Episode: "Sin Bin"
1994-1997	Common As Muck	Sharon	7 episodes
1994–1998	Harry Enfield & Chums	Various	
1995	Jackanory	Storyteller	Story: The Twits
1995	Performance	Christine	Episode: After Miss Julie
1997	The History of Tom Jones: A Foundling	Honour	Miniseries
1998	Rex the Runt	Mrs Mandelbrotska	Episode: "Adventures on Telly 3"
1999	Let Them Eat Cake	Cecile	
1999–2001	Gimme Gimme Gimme	Linda La Hughes	
2003	Happiness	Kathy Burke	Episode: "A Little Bit of Love"
2005	Twenty Thousand Streets Under the Sky	Landlady (voice)	Miniseries
2006	Dawn French's Girls Who Do Comedy	Herself	
2007	The Catherine Tate Show	Diane	Christmas Special
2008	Ruddy Hell, It's Harry & Paul!	Queen	1 episode
2009	Horne & Corden		Director
2010	Kathy Burke's Little Cracker: Better Than Christmas	Nun	Writer
2012	Walking and Talking	Nun	Writer
2012	Never Mind the Buzzcocks	Guest Host	1 episode
2012, 2013, 2015	Have I Got News for You	Herself	3 episodes
2013	Psychobitches	Mona Lisa; The Queen Mother	2 episodes
2014	8 Out of 10 Cats Does Countdown	Herself	1 episode
2014	Celebrity Gogglebox	Herself	1 episode
2016	Crashing	Aunt Gladys	1 episode
2017–2020	School of Roars	Ms. Grizzlesniff	Voice
2019	Kathy Burke's All Woman	Herself	
2019	The Great British Bake Off: An Extra Slice	Herself	
2019	Joe Lycett's Got Your Back	Herself	
2021	RuPaul's Drag Race UK	Herself; Guest judge	Series 3, Episode 9
2021	Kathy Burke: Money Talks	Herself; presenter	2-part Channel 4 documentary
2022	Holding		Director
2023	Kathy Burke: Growing Up	Herself; presenter	2-part Channel 4 special

== Theatre ==
=== As actress ===
Year	Title	Role	Venue
1989	Amongst Barbarians	Lilli	Royal Exchange, Manchester
1993	It's a Great Big Shame!		Theatre Royal Stratford East

=== As director ===
Year	Title	Venue	Notes
1990	Mr Thomas by Kathy Burke	Old Red Lion	Also shown on Channel 4
1995	Boom Bang-a-Bang by Jonathan Harvey	Bush Theatre	
2001	Out in the Open by Jonathan Harvey	Hampstead Theatre	
2002	Betty by Karen McLachlan	Vaudeville Theatre	
2002	Kosher Harry by Nick Grosso	Royal Court Theatre	
2003	Born Bad by Debbie Tucker Green	Hampstead Theatre	
2004	The Quare Fellow by Brendan Behan		Oxford Stage Company
2004	Love Me Tonight by Nick Stafford	Hampstead Theatre	
2005	Blue/Orange by Joe Penhall	Cambridge Arts Theatre	
2005	The God of Hell by Sam Shepard	Donmar Warehouse	
2006	Smaller by Carmel Morgan	Lyric Theatre, London	
2014	Once a Catholic by Mary O'Malley	Tricycle Theatre	
2018	Lady Windermere's Fan by Oscar Wilde	Vaudeville Theatre, West End, London	

== Music videos ==
Year	Song	Artist	Notes
1989	"Help!"	Bananarama featuring Lananeeneenoonoo	
1989	"Ouija Board, Ouija Board"	Morrissey	
1997	"Who Do You Think You Are"	Spice Girls	Comic Relief Version

== Podcasting ==
Year	Title	Company	Notes
2022–2025	Where There's a Will, There's a Wake	Sony Music Entertainment	

== Awards ==
Year	Award	Category	Work	Result
1994	Royal Television Society Programme Awards	Best Actress	Mr Wroe's Virgins	Won
1997	Cannes Film Festival	Best Actress	Nil By Mouth	Won
1997	British Independent Film Award	Best Actress	Nil By Mouth	Won
1998	British Academy Film Awards	Best Actress	Nil By Mouth	Nominated
1998	British Academy Television Awards	Best Actress	Tom Jones	Nominated
1998	BAFTA TV Awards	Best Light Entertainment Performance	Harry Enfield & Chums	Nominated
1999	BAFTA TV Awards	Best Light Entertainment Performance	Harry Enfield's Yule log Chums	Nominated
2001	BAFTA TV Awards	Best Comedy Performance	Gimme Gimme Gimme	Nominated
2002	BAFTA TV Awards	Best Comedy Performance	Gimme Gimme Gimme	Nominated
2002	British Comedy Awards	Best Comedy Actress	Gimme Gimme Gimme	Won
