= Debby Bishop =

British actress

- Born: Lewisham, in south east London
- Occupation: Actress

Debby Bishop (also credited as Debbie Bishop) is a British actress. She appeared in the second series of the television crime drama Widows 2, having taken over the part of Bella O'Reilly from Eva Mottley who died before production began.

Bishop was born in Lewisham, in south east London. She began her professional acting career at the former Albany Empire Theatre in Deptford, South London in 1978 where she first appeared on stage in a number of shows produced by "The Combination" which was the resident theatre company there. In 1980 she was featured in a BBC Documentary "Fringe Benefits" where she appeared as a singer alongside a number of other Fringe Theatre groups, such as The Sadista Sisters.

She appeared in the films Walter and June (1982), The Missionary (1982), Party Party (1983), Scrubbers (1983), Slayground (1983), Blue Money (1984) and Sid and Nancy (1986), in which she had a starring role as Phoebe. She was also featured in the West End production of Blues in the Night.

Debby Bishop's additional theatre credits include Reggae Britannia and Restoration at the Royal Court in London, The Wiz at the Lyric Hammersmith and the Crucible Theatre, Sheffield, and 1,000 Clowns at the Watford Palace. Additional TV credits include Bouncing Back, and Pam in Blue Money and the soap Family Affairs, the last television or film role in which Bishop was cast. Her last theatre performance was the Cabaret in the House show with Peter Straker at Lauderdale House theatre in London, March 2004.

Debby Bishop has supported charitable community theatre. She has been a patron of Montage Theatre Arts in London since 2005 with fellow actress Sylvestra Le Touzel.
