= Eva Mottley =

British actress (1953–1985)

- Born: Eva Henderson Mottley; 24 October 1953; Barbados
- Died: 14 February 1985 (aged 31); Maida Vale, London, England
- Occupation: Actress
- Relatives: Mia Mottley (cousin); Ernest Deighton Mottley (grandfather)

Eva Henderson Mottley (24 October 1953 – 14 February 1985) was a Barbadian-born British actress. She played Bella O'Reilly in the television drama Widows, and Corinne Tulser, wife of Denzil Tulser, in Only Fools and Horses.

== Early life ==
Mottley was born into a family of politicians in Barbados in 1953. Her grandfather, Ernest Mottley, was the first mayor of Bridgetown, while her cousin, Mia Mottley, was elected Prime Minister of Barbados in 2018. She was raised in Nigeria and England.

After serving 15 months in prison for possession of LSD, Mottley embarked on an acting career.

== Career ==
Mottley appeared in the television drama series Widows, and was scheduled to appear in its sequel. However, shortly before her death in 1985, she left the production of Widows 2, claiming that she had been racially and sexually abused by the production team. Widows 2 was broadcast nearly two months later, with Debby Bishop in the role of Bella. Mottley's film credits included Scrubbers and a small role in Superman III.

She had made other TV appearances, including in Bergerac and a guest role on the sitcom Only Fools and Horses, in the episode "Who's a Pretty Boy?" as Corinne, the sharp-tongued wife of regular character Denzil. The character was originally set to appear in more episodes, but owing to Mottley's death, John Sullivan chose not to recast the role out of respect to Mottley. Her character, Corinne, later separated from Denzil.

== Personal life ==
Mottley had a two-year relationship with musician David Bowie.

== Death ==
In the months leading up to her death, Mottley became depressed about losing her job and developed an addiction to cocaine and alcohol. Her addiction led to debts of £25,000 (equivalent to £81,000 in 2025). On Valentine's Day 1985, Mottley's body was found in her Shirland Road flat in Maida Vale, west London. She had died by overdosing on alcohol and barbiturates, aged 31 years old. She left one suicide note to her parents and another that was only partially legible.
