= Daylight Robbery (TV series) =

- VHS cover
- Genre: Crime drama
- Created by: Jane Hewland; Johanne McAndrew; Caleb Ransom; Cameron McAllister
- Directed by: Cameron McAllister; David Innes Edwards; Justin Chadwick
- Starring: Michelle Collins; Lesley Sharp; Geraldine Somerville; Emily Woof; Beth Goddard; Katisha Kenyon; John Salthouse; Patrick Robinson
- Composer: Rob Lane
- Country of origin: United Kingdom
- Original language: English
- No. of series: 2
- No. of episodes: 8

Production
- Executive producer: Jane Hewland
- Producer: Cameron McAllister
- Cinematography: Jonathan Bloom; Simon Maggs
- Editors: Mark Thornton; Tim Murrell
- Running time: 50 minutes
- Production company: Hewland International

Original release
- Network: ITV
- Release: 9 September 1999 – 18 December 2000

Daylight Robbery is a British television crime drama series, broadcast on ITV, that ran for two series from 9 September 1999 until 18 December 2000. The series focuses on four Essex housewives struggling with personal and domestic problems. Kathy Lawrence (Michelle Collins), Carol Murphy (Lesley Sharp), Val McArdle (Geraldine Somerville) and Paula Sullivan (Emily Woof) decide to turn to a life of crime when they are held up by an armed gang in the supermarket.

After pulling off an easy first job, the gang gradually become more daring, but find their luck turning when they stage a raid on Kathy's bank. To make matters worse, their haul of loot literally goes up in flames when Kathy's house falls prey to an arson attack, and with the police – led by the dogged Detective Inspector Finch (John Salthouse) – closing in, the women plan one last, desperate throw of the dice. The second series follows Kathy and Paula on the run in Miami, where they fall foul of gang boss Harris (Ramon Tikaram) after stealing his haul of cocaine. They also join forces with two other British housewives, Harriet Howell (Beth Goddard) and Chanice Johnson (Katisha Kenyon). As Harris pursues the women back to England, their old opponent, Detective Inspector Finch, is waiting to finally bring them to justice.

Both series were issued on VHS video on 27 January 2003, becoming two of the last commercially released videos, but have yet to be issued on DVD. In 2001, USA Network bought the rights to the format, commissioning an eight-part remake, with producer Cameron McAllister acting as a consultant producer. However, the remake was unexpectedly cancelled mid-production, and did not make it to air.

== Cast ==
- Michelle Collins as Kathy Lawrence
- Emily Woof as Paula Sullivan
- Lesley Sharp as Carol Murphy (Series 1)
- Geraldine Somerville as Val McArdle (Series 1)
- Beth Goddard as Harriet Howell (Series 2)
- Katisha Kenyon as Chanice Johnson (Series 2)
- John Salthouse as DI Eddie Finch

=== Supporting cast ===
- Martin Crewes as Anthony Sullivan (Series 1—2)
- Ross Boatman as Alan McArdle (Series 1)
- Clarence Smith as Marcus Tanner (Series 1)
- Sasha Tilley as Emma Lawrence (Series 1—2)
- Jack Richards as James Lawrence (Series 1—2)
- Bruce Byron as Phil Murphy (Series 1—2)
- Daniel Newman as Jason Murphy (Series 1)
- Kai Pearce as Stephen Murphy (Series 1—2)
- Nicholas Hewetson as Gavin Howell (Series 2)
- Ollie Peel as Oscar Howell (Series 2)
- Patrick Robinson as Sergeant Chris Bannister (Series 1—2)
- James Bowers as DS Darren Holme (Series 1)
- Romla Walker as DC Paula Marcus (Series 2)
- Brenda Kempner as Pat Rice (Series 1—2)
- Ramon Tikaram as Adrian Harris (Series 2)

== Episodes ==
=== Series 1 (1999) ===
No.	Title	Directed by	Written by	Original release date	U.K. viewers (millions)
1	"Episode 1"	David Innes Edwards	Jane Hewland & Johanne McAndrew	9 September 1999	10.29
Sisters Val and Paula are caught up in an armed robbery at the supermarket where they work, but the day's events force Val to reveal an unexpected secret: that after seven years of trying, she has finally fallen pregnant – which on the surface, seems to be fantastic news – until she reveals that baby may not be her husband's. Meanwhile, former WAG Kathy struggles to make ends meet when her husband, Michael, deserts her leaving behind thousands of pounds of debt, and some potentially dangerous enemies. Trader Carol finds her world turned upside down when her drug-addicted son, Jason, relapses and disappears. Fuelled by the supermarket robbery, Paula is angered when the landlord of a local pub makes vicious comments towards her and Val, and in an act of revenge, she decides to rob the pub and manages to walk away with more than £4,000.
2	"Episode 2"	David Innes Edwards	Johanne McAndrew	16 September 1999	8.95
Kathy and Carol are delighted when Paula offers to split the proceeds from the pub robbery. Kathy's debts finally catch up with her, as one of her husband's creditors decides to clear out her house to recover the £50,000 owed to him. However, her social life receives an unexpected boost after a chance meeting with a stranger in court. Val confronts her demons as she is forced to reveal her pregnancy to Alan, despite Marcus begging her to have an abortion. Still feeling the buzz, Paula's excitement rubs off on Kathy, who concocts a plan to rob a petrol station. Although the robbery goes off without a hitch, the gang only manage to recover £947. In need of a desperate boost, Paula decides the gang's next target will be a high street building society. As the gang execute their plan, unexpected security measures leave the gang penniless and Paula trapped inside.
3	"Episode 3"	David Innes Edwards	Caleb Ranson	23 September 1999	9.39
Having escaped from the building society unscathed, the gang regroup and decide to hit a bigger target: Kathy's bank. The police receive a ransom video from Paula, who tries to throw them off the scent. Kathy's personal life continues to spiral as she receives a ransom note demanding £10,000. As the bank robbery gets underway, all goes well until the gang are confronted by an armed police unit, headed by none other than Kathy's new beau, Chris. In the ensuing stand off, Paula gets carried away and fires her gun; supposedly shooting Chris. Although his injuries are later discovered to be superficial, Kathy realises that their relationship is over. As Kathy vows to take care of the bank haul, she falls victim to an arson attack; and the money goes up in flames. Carol discovers that Jason has possession of her gun, and during a rooftop showdown, tragedy ensues.
4	"Episode 4"	Cameron McAllister	Caleb Ranson	30 September 1999	9.64
With the proceeds of the building society raid destroyed, the remaining members of the gang attend Carol's funeral. Realising that the police are close to nailing them, the gang decide to take one last throw of the dice, and plan a raid on the ticket office at West Ham United Football Club, where Kathy has been invited to a special do. The raid goes as planned, until police surveillance spot Val waiting in the getaway car. As the pressure of the whole situation begins to stress her, her waters break and she goes into premature labour. While Paula manages to escape with her in an ambulance, Kathy finds herself surrounded, until Chris unexpectedly comes to her rescue. As he prepares to fly her and the children across the channel, Paula's cover is blown by Alan, leading to a pursuit across the countryside as Paula attempts to reach Kathy's plane before it leaves.

=== Series 2 (2000) ===
No.	Title	Directed by	Written by	Original release date	U.K. viewers (millions)
5	"Back to the Start"	Cameron McAllister	Francis Johnson	27 November 2000	7.76
Kathy's new life in Florida turns sour when her money is stolen, and she turns to robbery to put things right. Paula, meanwhile, is in hiding, working as an au pair in London.
6	"You Can Run... But You Can't Hide"	Cameron McAllister	Caleb Ranson	4 December 2000	8.17
On the run from the Miami mobsters, Kathy flees to London, but Harris is determined to track her down and get his money back.
7	"Same Four Walls"	Justin Chadwick	Huw Kennair-Jones	11 December 2000	7.26
Harris has James hostage and demands payment, forcing Kathy to contemplate another robbery.
8	"Walking Invisible"	Justin Chadwick	June Rothwell	18 December 2000	7.92
With the police and the mafia closing in, the women decide to fake their own deaths.
