= Maureen O'Farrell =

British actress

Maureen O'Farrell is a British actress, who is perhaps best known for her role as the feisty but vulnerable Linda Perelli in the Lynda La Plante crime dramas Widows (1983) and Widows 2 (1985).

O'Farrell is also one of Britain's finest performers and teachers of Egyptian dance. After studying dance and drama at Hull, she travelled to Egypt to learn her craft and has combined her acting work with a career as a professional dancer. She has performed professionally in Egypt, North Africa, Turkey and throughout Europe, as well as organising workshops for dance students in the UK. After completing a degree course in Social Anthropology in the Middle East in 1996, O'Farrell moved away from acting, and has worked as a choreographer and technical advisor on Egyptian dance in various film and TV productions. Now known professionally as Sara Farouk Ahmed, O'Farrell lives in Cairo and continues her performing and teaching career.

Other TV credits include Minder, Dempsey and Makepeace, C.A.T.S. Eyes, The Bill and Coronation Street.
