= James Dreyfus =

British actor (born 1968)

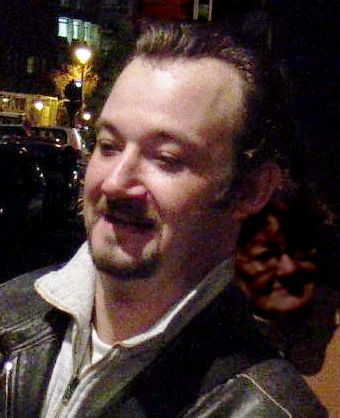
- Dreyfus in 2004
- Born: James Louis de Zogheb Dreyfus; 9 October 1968 (age 58); London, England
- Education: Royal Academy of Dramatic Art (BA)
- Occupation: Actor
- Years active: 1995–present
- Television: The Thin Blue Line (1995–1996); Gimme Gimme Gimme (1999–2001); My Hero (2006); The Sarah Jane Adventures (2011); Mount Pleasant (2012–2017)

James Louis de Zogheb Dreyfus (born 9 October 1968) is an English actor most notable for roles on television sitcoms The Thin Blue Line as Constable Kevin Goody, and Gimme Gimme Gimme as Tom Farrell. Dreyfus is most recently known for a role as the Reverend Roger Jones in Mount Pleasant.

In London's West End, Dreyfus starred in The Producers in 2004 as Carmen Ghia. In 2006, he starred as the Emcee in Cabaret.

== Early life ==
James Louis de Zogheb Dreyfus was born on 9 October 1968 in Islington, London. His parents divorced when he was very young. His mother, Margo de Zoghels, was a model. His maternal grandfather was of Syrian descent and his family immigrated to the United Kingdom from Damascus. He also has English, Italian, Greek, Norwegian, French and Swiss ancestry.

He was educated at Harrow School. He then trained at the Royal Academy of Dramatic Art.

== Career ==
At the 1998 Laurence Olivier Awards, Dreyfus won the Laurence Olivier Award for Best Supporting Performance in a Musical for his work in Lady in the Dark at the National Theatre. In the same year, Dreyfus won Second Prize at the Ian Charleson Awards for his 1997 performance as Caius Cassius in William Shakespeare's Julius Caesar at the Birmingham Rep.

Dreyfus's first television break came with the BBC comedy series Absolutely Fabulous. followed by roles as Constable Kevin Goody in Ben Elton's sitcom The Thin Blue Line and Tom Farrell, the gay flatmate of Linda la Hughes (Kathy Burke) in Gimme Gimme Gimme. Dreyfus played opposite Bette Midler in the short-lived American sitcom Bette.

Known for portraying "camp, endearing characters," Dreyfus (in a Sheengate Publishing interview) compared the character Frank Spencer from Some Mothers Do 'Ave 'Em, whom he described as a campy but married heterosexual, to Dreyfus's character Kevin Goody from The Thin Blue Line. Regarding his character Tom Farrell from Gimme Gimme Gimme, Dreyfus hypothesized that, even if the character were heterosexual, the actor would still portray Tom as camp and flamboyant. Furthermore, Dreyfus said that he felt that he became typecast due to his portrayals of "flamboyant" characters.

He played Thermoman in the BBC One comedy My Hero, a role he took over in the sixth series from Ardal O'Hanlon. Although the same character, he used the name George Monday, as opposed to O'Hanlon's character's name, George Sunday. After disappointing ratings, the show was cancelled.

Dreyfus also starred as Mr Teasy-Weasy in the 2004 comedy film Churchill: The Hollywood Years.

From 2012 to 2017, Dreyfus appeared as the Reverend Roger Jones in the Sky Living series Mount Pleasant.

In 2017, he voiced an incarnation of The Master from Doctor Who in the Big Finish Productions release The First Doctor Adventures Volume One, going on to appear as the character in 2019's "The Home Guard", 2020's "The Psychic Circus" and 2022's "Blood of the Time Lords". In an interview on SpectatorTV, Dreyfus said he was dismissed from the role following comments he made on Twitter in support of author J. K. Rowling.

== Personal life ==
Dreyfus is gay.

== Filmography ==
Year	Title	Role	Notes
1995	Thin Ice	Greg	
1995–1996	The Thin Blue Line	Constable Kevin Goody	TV series (14 episodes)
1995–1996	Absolutely Fabulous	Christopher	TV series (2 episodes)
1996	Boyfriends	Paul	
1999	Notting Hill	Martin	
1999–2001	Gimme Gimme Gimme	Tom Farrell	TV series (19 episodes)
2000	The Nearly Complete and Utter History of Everything	Swedish Ambassador	Two-part BBC special celebration for the new millennium.
2000	Gormenghast	Professor Fluke	TV
2000–2001	Bette	Oscar	U.S. TV series (18 episodes)
2004	Fat Slags	Fidor Konstantin	TV
2004	Agent Cody Banks 2: Destination London	Gordon	
2004	The Producers	Carmen Ghia	Theatre Royal, Drury Lane
2004	Waking the Dead	Raymond Carstairs	
2005	Willo the Wisp	All voices	Revival to original 1981 series
2006	Colour Me Kubrick	Melvyn Prescott	
2006	My Hero	George Monday / Thermoman	TV series (8 episodes)
2006–2007	Cabaret	Emcee	Lyric Theatre, London
2007	Double Time	Lawrence Nixon/George McCabe	
2007	Nina and the Neurons	Felix (voice)	
2009	Casualty	Rory	TV
2011	The Sarah Jane Adventures	John Harrison	Episode: "The Man Who Never Was"
2012	Midsomer Murders	Ralph Ford	Episode: "A Rare Bird"
2012	Holby City	Felix	TV
2012	Whitechapel	Charlie Cross	TV series, 2 episodes
2012–2017	Mount Pleasant	The Reverend Roger Jones	TV series
2013	Dandelion & Burdock	Dandelion	TV
2013–2014	Candide	Dr. Pangloss	Menier Chocolate Factory, London
2013	Shameless	Edward Clayhill	Episode: "An Inspector Calls"
2015	Father Brown	Binkie Cadwaller	Episode 3.10 "The Judgment of Man"
2015	Scottish Mussel	Headmaster	
2018	Doctor Who: The First Doctor Adventures Volume 01	The Master	Audio Drama, Episode: The Destination Wars
2018	Tales from New Earth	The Most Exalted High Persian	Audio Drama, Episode: The Cats of New Cairo
2019	Shakespeare & Hathaway: Private Investigators	Claude Mortimer	Episode: "Too Cold for Hell"
2019	Harry & Meghan: Becoming Royal	Sir Leonard Briggs	TV movie
2019	The Dark Crystal: Age of Resistance	Lath'N	
2019	Agatha Raisin	Harry Witherspoon	S3 E1 Episode: "Agatha Raisin and The Haunted House"
2019	Doctor Who: The Early Adventures	The Master	Audio Drama, Episode: The Home Guard
2020	Doctor Who: The Monthly Adventures	The Master	Audio Drama, Episode: The Psychic Circus
2020	Supernova	Tim	
2020	The Hollow		TV movie
2020	The Harbour	Robert	Short
2021	The Kindred	Mr. Mulvaney	
2022	Doctor Who: The Fourth Doctor Adventures	The Master	Audio Drama, Episode: Blood of the Time Lords
2022	Lips	Michael	Short
2023	One Foot in the Grave - 30 Years Of Laughs	Himself	Documentary
2024	House of the Dragon	Lord Gormon Massey	TV series, 6 episodes
2024	Cara	Greg Wilson	
2026	Semolina Pilchard	Detective Maxwell	
