= Nigel Pegram =

South African actor

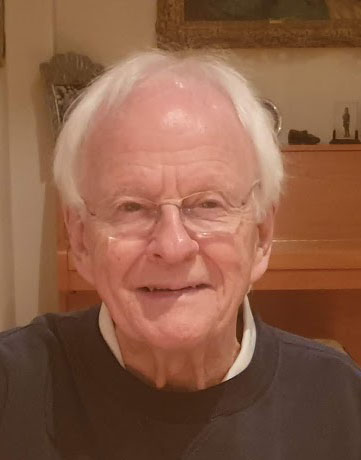
- Nigel Pegram in 2023
- Born: Nigel Harry Pegram; 22 November 1940 (age 85); Cape Town, South Africa
- Occupation: Actor
- Years active: 1963–2015
- Spouse: April Olrich (m. 1968; died 2014)

Nigel Pegram (born 22 November 1940) is a South African and British actor. He is best known for playing Eric in Robert's Robots (1973–1974), Group-Captain Ruark in Get Some In! (1977–1978), Sir Reginald in All Dogs Go to Heaven (1989), Mrs Willa Westinghouse in The American Way (1986), General Woundwort in Watership Down (2001) and starred as Nigel in three series in the ITV comedy drama series Outside Edge (1994–1996). As a character actor, he has played various roles on stage, TV and film.

== Early life ==
Pegram was born Cape Town, South Africa in 1940, moving to Bulawayo in Southern Rhodesia following his parents' divorce in 1942. His childhood took him to Batu Gajah in Malaya in 1947, Oxford in 1949, back to Bulawayo and then on to Tanganyika and Uganda in the 1950s, his peripatetic early life giving him the foundation for the many voices he uses in his professional work. He studied at Falcon College, Southern Rhodesia, and later gained a BA degree in law at the University of Natal in Durban. In 1962 he moved to the United Kingdom, where he studied at St Edmund Hall, Oxford. He soon joined the Oxford University Dramatic Society and in the summer of 1963 became involved the burgeoning British satire scene, performing at the Blue Angel Club, London, and in 1964 he participated in the Oxford Revue at the Edinburgh Festival alongside the likes of future Monty Python stars Michael Palin and Terry Jones.

== Career ==
After completing his studies, in 1965 Pegram moved to the United States when he joined the Oxford – Cambridge Revue for a three-month engagement with the Second City Company in Chicago. The following year he joined the cast of the musical revue Wait a Minim!, replacing Jeremy Taylor when the show moved to Broadway in early 1966, where he stayed on for a further two years at runs in various theatres across the US including the John Golden Theatre and Colonial Theatre. Shortly after marrying his fellow Wait a Minim star, ex Royal Ballet principal and actress April Olrich, in 1969 they returned to London and later that year he appeared on stage in the revue Postscripts, at the Hampstead Theatre Club, London.

From the early 1970s onwards, Pegram frequently featured in character roles within various films and TV programs including Robert's Robots (1973–1974), Larry Grayson (1975), Space: 1999 (1977), Get Some In! (1977–1978), The Professionals (1980), Fresh Fields (1985), The American Way (1986), Pulaski (1987), Drop the Dead Donkey (1990), Lovejoy (1992), Van der Valk (1992), Outside Edge (1994–1996), Proteus (1995), Melissa (1997), Written in Blood (1998) and Doctors (2003).

He has also done frequent work as a voice artist, voicing characters in animated films including All Dogs Go to Heaven (1989), An American Tail: Fievel Goes West (1991) and the TV series adaptions of Enid Blyton's Enchanted Lands (1998) and Watership Down (2001). In 1999, he was reunited with his former Oxford alumunus Michael Palin, when he voiced Ernest Hemingway in Palin's documentary series Michael Palin's Hemingway Adventure.

Pegram appeared in two series of the children's series Robert's Robots in the role of Eric, an android. In 1977 he played Cernik in an episode of the sci-fi series Space:1999; later that same year he appeared as Group Captain Ruark in an episode of the RAF sitcom Get Some In!, he returned as a regular character during the show's fifth and final series when it was relocated to an RAF hospital setting. In 1986, he appeared as transgender US presidential candidate Mrs Willa Westinghouse in the sci-fi comedy The American Way with Dennis Hopper and Michael J. Pollard, although the film was critically panned, Pegram's role was lauded by the critics. The following year Pegram appeared in four episodes as a TV Director in the drama series Pulaski, written by Roy Clarke.

Pegram is best remembered for playing the reacurring role of Nigel in three series of the ITV cricketing comedy drama series Outside Edge, based on the play by Richard Harris, in a part that was written specifically for him. The series was quite successful at the time, winning a number awards including Best TV Comedy Drama at the British Comedy Awards in 1994.

Outside his work in film and television, he has frequently appeared on stage. During the 1970s he was a member of the Reunion Theatre Company who staged shows at the Dolphin and Anchor Studio Theatre in Chichester. He appeared in roles such as a TV announcer in Beeston Craig and an Interviewee in an adaption of Before Breakfast by Eugene O'Neill. During this time, he also appeared in various pantomimes including Babes in the Wood and Red Riding Hood. He also appeared as a vicar in Curate's Egg, the Duke of Windsor in the 1980 UK tour of Crown Matrimonial, Melvin P. Thorpe in the West End production of The Best Little Whorehouse in Texas, and Wilson in The Case of the Dead Flamingo. More recently he appeared as Adam in Peter Hall's production of As You Like It in 2003, and the American Secretary of State Byrnes in Eden's Empire by James Graham, which was staged at the Finborough Theatre, London in 2006.

In 2010, Pegram appeared in an episode of the long-running detective series Agatha Christie's Poirot, in which he played Reverend Babbington in the episode 'Three Act Tragedy'. In 2011 he appeared as Bernard in the sitcom Outnumbered, and latterly as Alistair in an episode of Vicious, broadcast in June 2015.

== Personal life ==
In 1968, Pegram married Zanzibar-born ex Royal Ballet principal and actress April Olrich, one of his co-stars in Wait a Minim!, on top of Coit Tower in San Francisco prior to their move to London the following year. They remained married for 46 years until her death in April 2014. Upon her death. he took over sponsoring her April Olrich Award for Dynamic Performance which she founded at the Royal Ballet School in Richmond Park.

== Filmography ==
Year	Title	Role	Notes
1970	Frost on Sunday	Performer	TX: 4/1/1970
1970	Up Pompeii!	Soldier	Episode: "Britannicus"
1972	The Sooty Show	Guest (self)	Series 7, episode 2
1973	Outa-Space	Voice (n/a)	7 episodes
1973 – 1974	Robert's Robots	Eric, Parrot (voice), Mini (voice)	14 episodes
1974	Funny Ha-Ha	On-screen participant	Episode: "Don't Blame Us!"
1974	The Tomorrow People	Grandfather/ Traffic Warden	6 episodes
1975	Larry Grayson	Virgil, Newsreader, Various characters	5 episodes
1975	The World of Television	Narrator (voice)	6 episodes
1976	Keep It Up Downstairs	Count Von Schilling	Film
1977	Space: 1999	Cernik	Episode: "The Seance Spectre"
1977	The Punch Review	Various characters	6 episodes
1977	The Other One	Peter Warr	Series 1, episode 7
1977 – 1978	Get Some In!	Group-Captain Ruark	8 episodes
1980	Can We Get on Now, Please?	Mr Withers	Episode: "Pettigrew's Last Stand"
1980	Daisy	Radio announcer	TV movie
1980	Leave it to Charlie	Justin	Episode: "A Star is Born"
1980	The Professionals	Wendell	Episode: "The Gun"
1980	Watch This Space	n/a	Episode: "Skwirt"
1983	Princess Daisy	Dr. Harris	TV mini series
1983	Tom, Dick and Harriet	J.T.	Episode: "Baby Blues"
1984	The Front Line	Centre clerk	Series 1, episode 3
1985	Fresh Fields	Mr Bradley	Episode: "A Waiting Game"
1986	The American Way	Mrs Willa Westinghouse	Film
1986	The Singing Detective	Busker	Episode: "Skin"
1987	Hardwicke House	Mr Van der Git	Episode: "The Visit"
1987	Pulaski: The TV Detective	TV Director	4 episodes
1988	Stowaways on the Ark	Japeth/ Old Woodworm (voice)	Film
1989	All Dogs Go To Heaven	Sir Reginald (voice)	Film
1989	Capital City	Ralph Goldring	2 episodes
1990	Drop the Dead Donkey	Minister	Episode: "Old Father Time"
1990	Screen One	William Henderson	Episode: "News Hounds"
1990	Never Come Back	Dr. Carver	TV mini series
1991	The Winjin' Pom	Frazer (voice)	TV series
1991	The Diamond Brothers: South by South East	Police commissioner	TV mini series
1991	An American Tail: Fivel Goes West	Various voices	Film
1992	Lovejoy	Douglas Rimmer	Episode: "Friends in High Places"
1992	The Power of One	Man guest #1	Film
1992	Van der Valk	Didier Clebert	Episode: "The Ties that Bind"
1993	We're Back! A Dinosaur's Story	n/a (voice)	Film
1994	Under the Hammer	Martin	Episode: "Wonders of the Deep"
1994 – 1996	Outside Edge	Nigel	15 episodes
1995	Proteus	Dr. Shelley	Film
1997	Melissa	South African Doctor	Series 1, episode 1
1998	Enid Blyton's Enchanted Lands	Various voices	7 episodes
1998	The Ruth Rendell Mysteries	Owen Struther	2 episodes
1998	Written in Blood	Father Bridghley	Film
1999	One More Kiss	Opera buff	Film
1999	Michael Palin's Hemingway Adventure	Ernest Hemingway (voice)	Episode 4
1999 – 2010	Simsala Grimm	Doc Croc (voice)	52
2001	Watership Down	General Woundwort (voice)	13 episodes
2002	Island Xtreme Stunts	n/a (voice)	Video game
2003	Doctors	Stan Allen	Episode: "A Job For Life"
2005	Rosamunde Pilcher	Robert (uncredited)	Episode: "Vermächtnis der Liebe"
2005	Beneath Still Waters	Additional voices	Film
2010	Agatha Christie's Poirot	Reverend Babington	Episode: "Three Act Tragedy"
2010	Simsala Grimm II: The Adventures of Yoyo and Doc Croc	Doc Croc (voice)	26 episodes
2011	Outnumbered	Bernard	Episode: "The Funeral"
2015	Vicious	Alistair	Episode: "Stag Do"

== Selected Theatre roles ==
Year	Title	Role	Notes
1963 – 1964	Satire Revue	Various characters	The Blue Angel Club, London
1964	The Oxford Revue	Various characters	Edinburgh Festival 1964
1965	The Carrier Baggers	Performer	The Poor Millionaire, London
1965	The Oxford – Cambridge Revue	Various characters	Second City Theatre, Chicago
1966 – 1968	Wait a Minim!	Performer	John Golden Theatre, Colonial Theatre
1969	Postscripts	Various characters	Hampstead Theatre Club, Hampstead
1975	Curate's Egg	Vicar	Maximus Theatre, London
1976	Red Riding Hood	Demon Sheerspite	Thorndike Theatre, Leatherhead
1977	Beeston Craig	TV Announcer	Dolphin and Anchor Studio Theatre, Chichester
1978	Before Breakfast	The Interviewee	Dolphin and Anchor Studio Theatre, Chichester
1980	Crown Matrimonial	The Duke of Windsor	UK Tour
1981	The Best Little Whorehouse in Texas	Melvin P. Thorpe	Theatre Royal, Drury Lane, London
1992	The Case of the Dead Flamingo	Wilson	Churchill Theatre, Bromley
1996	Horace	Tullus, King of Rome	Lyric Studio, London
2003	As You Like It	Adam	Shubert Theatre, Connecticut
2006	Eden's Empire	American Secretary of State Byrnes	Finborough Theatre, London
2007	Alphabetical Order	Geoffrey	The Mill at Sonning, Reading
