= Charles Coughlin =

Canadian-American Catholic priest (1891–1979)

The Reverend Monsignor Charles Coughlin
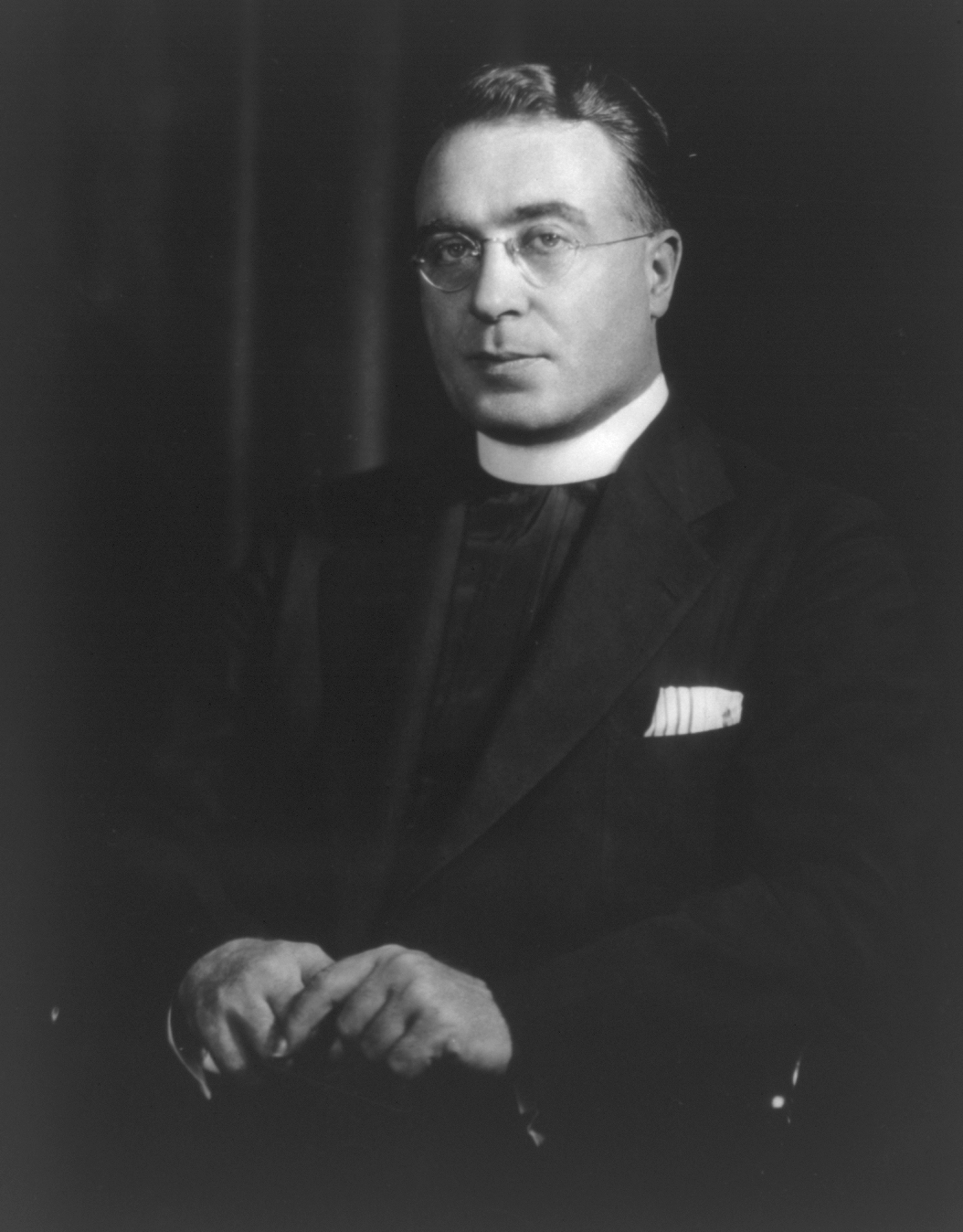
- Father Coughlin in 1933
- Church: Latin Church

Orders
- Ordination: 1916 by Neil McNeil

Personal details
- Born: Charles Edward Coughlin; October 25, 1891 Hamilton, Ontario, Canada
- Died: October 27, 1979 (aged 88) Bloomfield Hills, Michigan, U.S.
- Buried: Holy Sepulchre Cemetery, Southfield, Michigan
- Education: University of Toronto

Charles Edward Coughlin (/ˈkɒɡlɪn/ kawg-lin; October 25, 1891 – October 27, 1979), commonly known as Father Coughlin, was a Canadian-American Catholic priest based near Detroit. He was the founding priest of the National Shrine of the Little Flower. Dubbed "The Radio Priest " and considered at the time a leading demagogue, he was one of the first political leaders to use radio to reach a mass audience. During the 1930s, when the U.S. population was about 120 million, an estimated 30 million listeners tuned in to his weekly broadcasts.

Coughlin was born in Ontario to working-class Irish Catholic parents. He was ordained to the priesthood in 1916, and in 1923 he was assigned to the National Shrine of the Little Flower in Royal Oak, Michigan. Coughlin began broadcasting his sermons during a time of increasing anti-Catholic sentiment across the globe. As his broadcasts became more political, he became increasingly popular.

Initially, Coughlin was a vocal supporter of Franklin D. Roosevelt and his New Deal; he later fell out with Roosevelt, accusing him of being too friendly to bankers. In 1934, he established the National Union for Social Justice, a political organization whose platform called for monetary reforms, nationalization of major industries and railroads, and protection of labor rights. Its membership ran into the millions but was not well organized locally.

After making attacks on Jewish bankers, Coughlin began to use his radio program Golden Hour to broadcast antisemitic commentary. In the late 1930s, he supported some of the policies of Nazi Germany and Fascist Italy. The broadcasts have been described as "a variation of the Fascist agenda applied to American culture". His chief topics were political and economic rather than religious, using the slogan "Social Justice".

After the outbreak of World War II in Europe in 1939, the National Association of Broadcasters forced the cancellation of Golden Hour. In 1942, the Archdiocese of Detroit forced Coughlin to close his newspaper Social Justice and forbade its distribution by mail. Coughlin vanished from the public arena, working as a parish pastor until retiring in 1966. He died in 1979 at age 88.

== Early life and work ==
Charles Coughlin was born on October 25, 1891, in Hamilton, Ontario, the only surviving child of Irish Catholic Amelia (née Mahoney) and Thomas Coughlin. His younger sister Agnes died in infancy, and thereafter his mother suffered chronic ill health. Born in a working-class neighborhood, he lived in a modest home situated between a Catholic cathedral and convent. His mother, who had regretted not becoming a nun, was the dominant figure in the household and instilled a deep sense of religion in Charles.

After his secondary education, Coughlin attended the University of Toronto, enrolling in St. Michael's College, run by the Congregation of St. Basil, and graduating in 1911. Coughlin then entered the Basilian Fathers. The Basilians were a traditional order that denounced usury and supported social justice. Coughlin prepared for the priesthood at St. Basil's Seminary and was ordained in Toronto in 1916 by Archbishop Neil McNeil. The Basilians then assigned him to teach at Assumption College, their institution in Windsor, Ontario.

In 1923, a reorganization of Coughlin's religious order resulted in his departure. The Vatican ordered the Basilians to change from a society of common life to a monastic life. The members of the order were required to take the traditional three religious vows of chastity, poverty, and obedience.

Unwilling to accept the monastic life, Coughlin applied for incardination, or transfer, out of the Basilians to the Archdiocese of Detroit. He was accepted in 1923 and moved to Detroit. The archdiocese assigned Coughlin to pastoral positions in several parishes. In 1925, when Coughlin was exiting a building in Detroit, he saw a man stealing a trunk from the back of his car. When Coughlin confronted the thief, he dropped the trunk and swung at him. The fight continued until Coughlin knocked him unconscious. The incident received coverage in the Detroit newspapers.

In 1926, he was assigned to the newly founded Shrine of the Little Flower, a congregation of 25 families in Royal Oak, Michigan.

== 1926 to 1942 ==
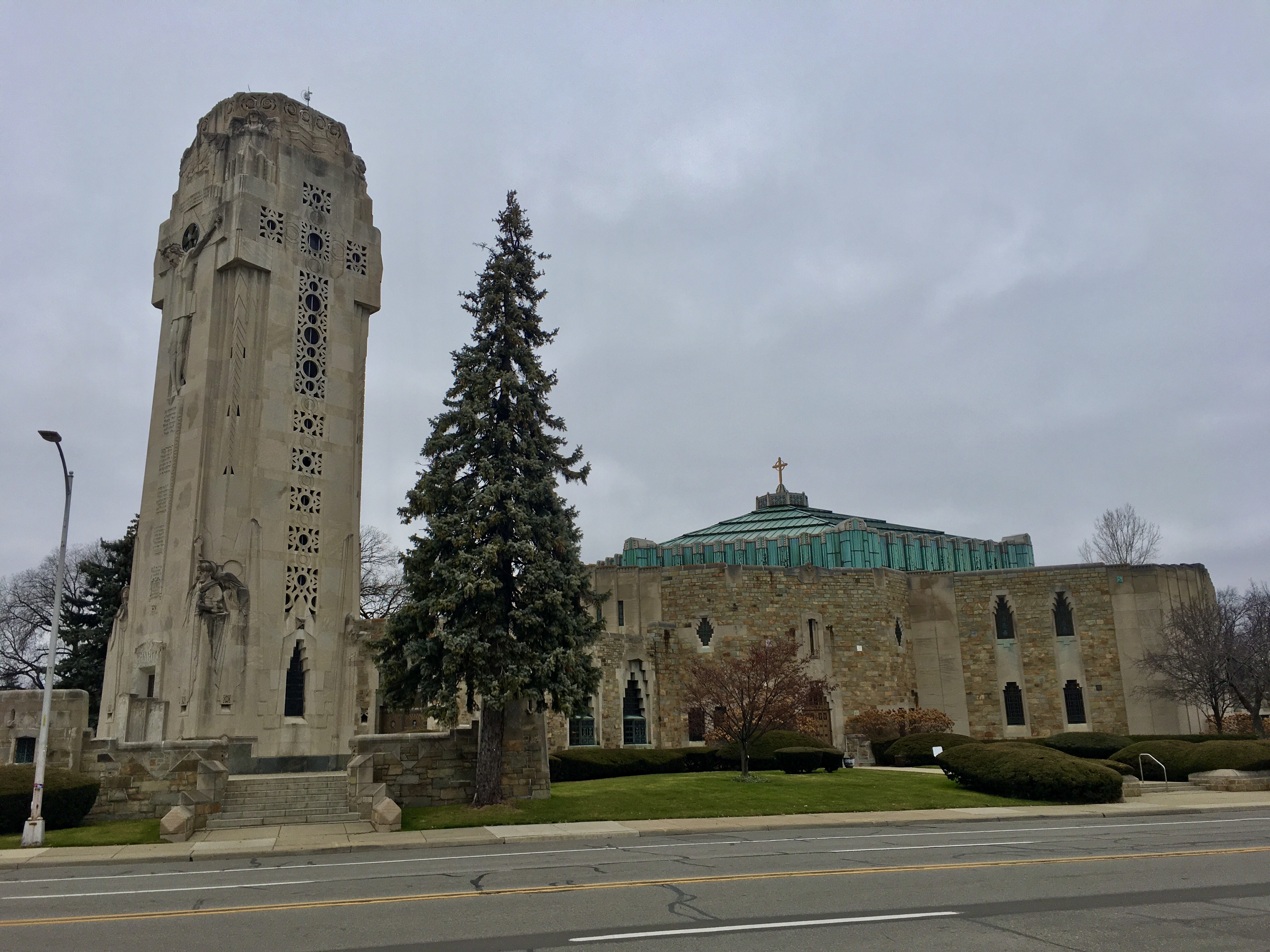
Charity Crucifixion Tower in front of National Shrine of the Little Flower, Royal Oak, Michigan

In 1926, Coughlin began broadcasting his Sunday sermons from local radio station WJR. He later said that he started his radio show in response to the Ku Klux Klan burning a cross at the shrine and wanted to provide support to local Catholics. However, the broadcast also provided him with extra income to pay back the diocesan loan owed by the shrine. Coughlin started on WJR with a weekly, hour-long radio program. A gifted speaker, he had a rich speaking voice and used a careful cadence.

When the Goodwill Stations radio network acquired WJR in 1929, owner George A. Richards recognized Coughlin's talent as a broadcaster. Richards encouraged Coughlin to focus his program more on politics than religion. Coughlin then started attacking income inequality, blaming the American banking system and the Jews for the poverty of American workers. The Columbia Broadcasting System (CBS) radio network signed a contract for Coughlin's program in 1930 for national broadcast. It was called the Radio League of the Little Flower.

=== 1931 to 1934 ===
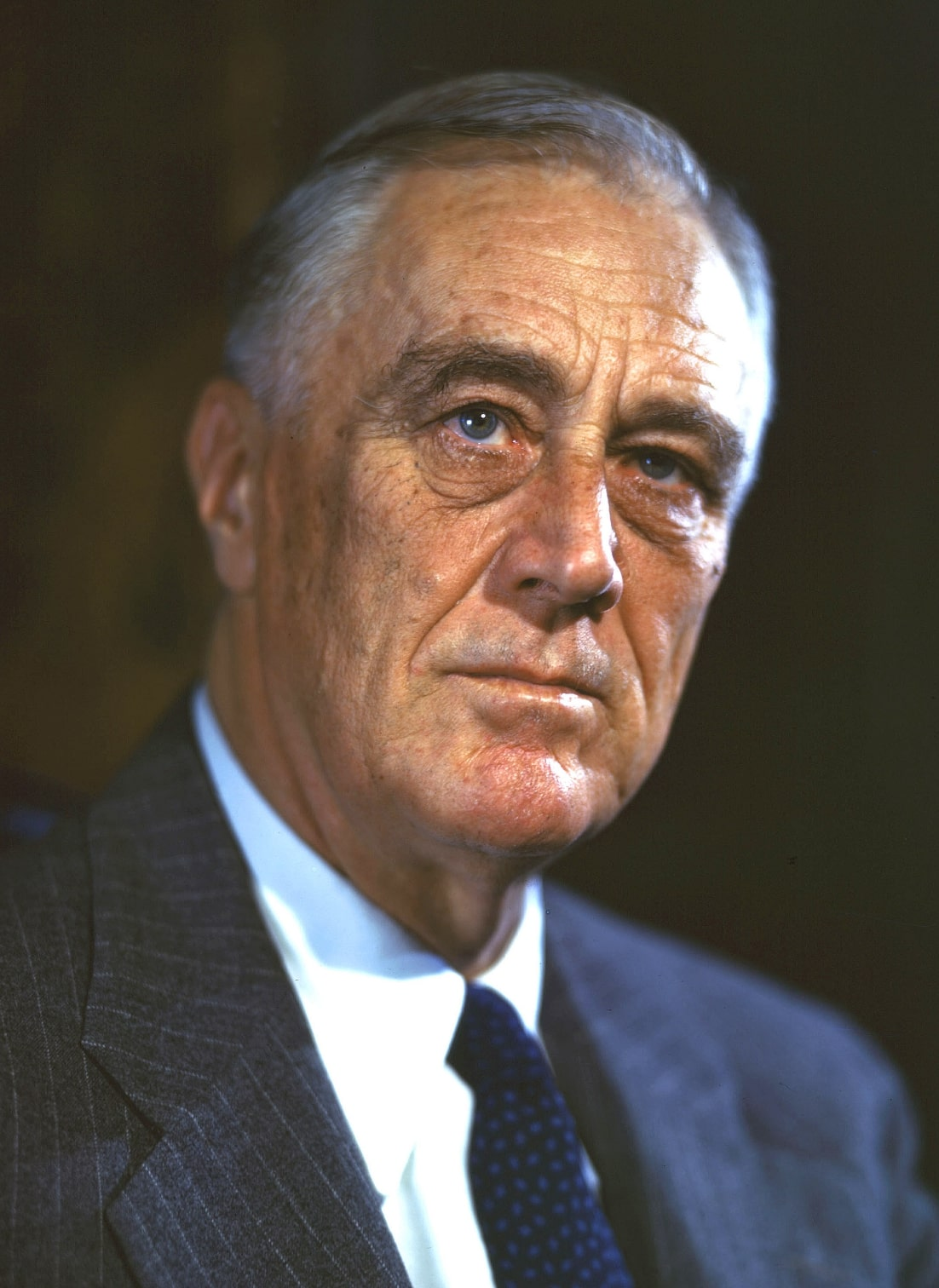
President Roosevelt

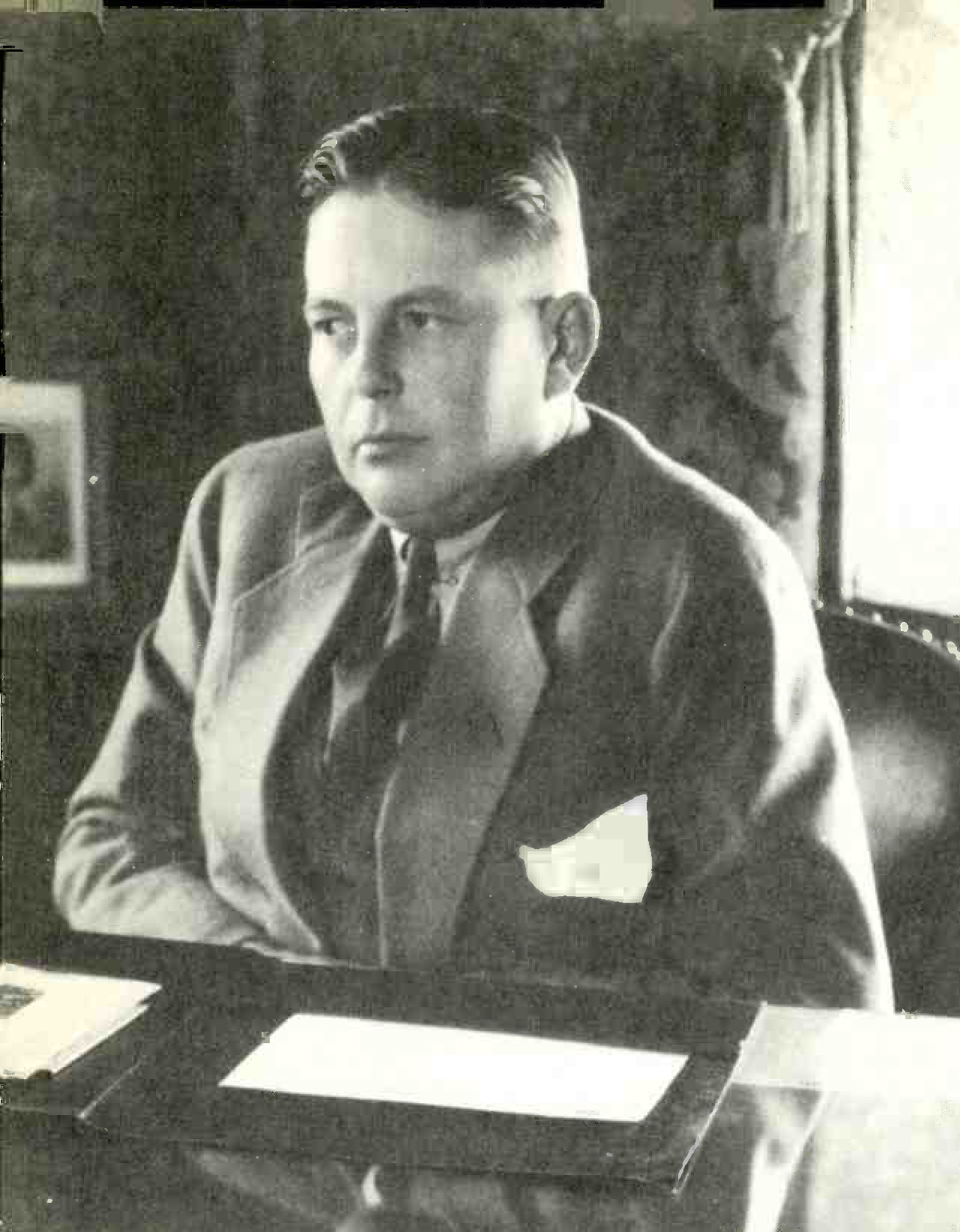
George Richards

By 1931, Coughlin had raised enough money from Radio League to construct the huge Charity Crucifixion Tower at the Shrine of the Little Flower.

In 1931, CBS received complaints from several affiliate stations about Coughlin's political views. CBS management was also concerned about his attacks on the administration of US President Herbert Hoover. CBS then demanded a review of Coughlin's scripts prior to broadcast, which he refused. When Coughlin's contract with CBS ended, the network decided not to renew it.

Coughlin and Richards then established an independently financed radio network. His show became the Golden Hour of the Shrine of the Little Flower, with WJR and WGAR in Cleveland serving as core stations. With Coughlin paying for the airtime on a contractual basis, the number of affiliates carrying Golden Hour increased to 25 stations by August 1932. Regional radio networks, such as the Yankee Network, the Quaker State Network, the Mohawk Network and the Colonial Network, also started carrying Golden Hour. Coughlin's radio network became the largest one of its type in the United States. Leo Fitzpatrick, who had given Coughlin his initial airtime over WJR in 1926 and was retained as a part-owner when Richards purchased the station, continued to serve as a confidant and advisor to Coughlin.

With the United States suffering through the Great Depression, Coughlin strongly endorsed New York Governor Franklin D. Roosevelt for president in the 1932 Presidential election. He was invited to attend the June 1932 Democratic National Convention in Chicago. An early supporter of Roosevelt's New Deal reforms, Coughlin coined the popular phrase "Roosevelt or Ruin". Another phrase Coughlin created was "The New Deal is Christ's Deal". After Roosevelt was elected in November 1932, he politely received Coughlin's policy proposals, but showed no interest in enacting them.

By 1933, Securities and Exchange Commission President Joseph P. Kennedy Sr., a strong New Deal and Roosevelt supporter who had befriended Coughlin, warned that Coughlin was "becoming a very dangerous proposition in the whole country" and "an out and out demagog [sic]" in a letter to Felix Frankfurter. That same year, The Literary Digest wrote, "Perhaps no man has stirred the country and cut as deep between the old order and the new as Father Charles E. Coughlin."

=== 1934 to 1936 ===
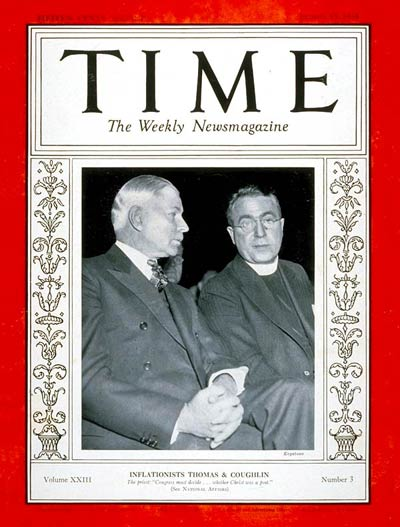
Father Coughlin (right) and Senator Elmer Thomas on the cover of Time Magazine (1934)

In 1934, Coughlin founded the National Union for Social Justice (NUSJ), a nationalistic workers' rights organization. Its leaders were impatient with what they considered Roosevelt's unconstitutional and pseudo-capitalistic monetary policies. The NUSJ soon gained a strong following among nativists and opponents of the Federal Reserve, especially in the American Midwest.

By 1934, Coughlin was perhaps the most prominent Catholic speaker on political and financial issues. His radio audience included tens of millions of Americans every week. Historian Alan Brinkley wrote that "by 1934, he [Coughlin] was receiving more than 10,000 letters every day" and that "his clerical staff at times numbered more than a hundred." He foreshadowed modern talk radio and televangelism. However, the University of Detroit Mercy states that Golden Hour's peak audience was in 1932.

It is estimated that at peak, one-third of the nation listened to his broadcasts. The Golden Hour office was receiving up to 80,000 letters per week from listeners. Author Sheldon Marcus said that the size of Coughlin's radio audience "is impossible to determine, but estimates range up to 30 million each week".

In 1934, Roosevelt sent Kennedy and Detroit Mayor Frank Murphy to visit Coughlin and try to temper his attacks. Coughlin visited Roosevelt several times at his estate in Hyde Park, New York. In a bid to control the excesses of the radio industry, Congress passed the Communications Act of 1934, establishing the Federal Communications Commission (FCC). FCC Chairman Frank R. McNinch warned that it would not allow broadcasters to use their networks or stations as "...an instrument of racial or religious persecution".

Coughlin's attacks on Roosevelt continued to increase. He began denouncing him as a tool of Wall Street. Coughlin opposed the New Deal with growing vehemence, attacking Roosevelt, capitalists and alleged Jewish conspirators. He encouraged the third-party candidacy of Louisiana Governor Huey Long for president in the 1936 election, but that was cut short by Long's assassination in 1935. Under Coughlin's direction, the NUSJ founded the Union Party in preparation for the 1936 elections.

=== 1936 to 1938 ===
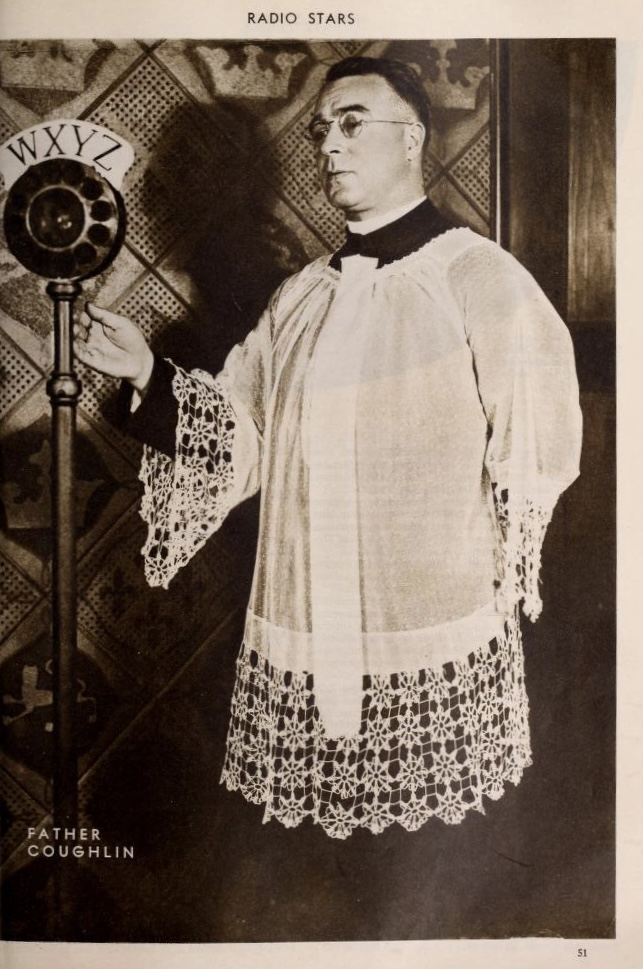
Father Coughlin delivering his Golden Hour program (1934)

In early 1936, at Kennedy's urging, Bishop Francis Spellman and Cardinal Eugenio Pacelli tried to mute Coughlin's vitriol. While the American Catholic hierarchy did not approve of Coughlin, only Coughlin's superior—Bishop Michael Gallagher of Detroit—had the canonical authority to curb him. Gallagher was a strong supporter of Coughlin and refused to stop him. The church hierarchy also feared the backlash from Coughlin's Catholic supporters if they reprimanded him.

Coughlin opened a new church building at the Shrine of the Little Flower in 1936, an octagonal structure shaped like a tent. One of its unique features was an altar positioned at the center of worship. This design did not become common in Catholic churches until the reforms of the Second Vatican Council in the 1960s.

With the start of the 1936 U.S. presidential election, Coughlin was ready to support a third party candidate running against Roosevelt. At a NUSJ rally at Cleveland Municipal Stadium on May 11, 1936, Coughlin predicted that NUSJ would "take half of Ohio" in the upcoming primary election, citing multiple congressional candidates with NUSJ backing. After the outbreak of the Spanish Civil War in July, Coughlin accused Roosevelt of "leaning toward international socialism" by his failure to support the Nationalists under General Francisco Franco. Coughlin presided over the Townsend Convention held in July at Cleveland Public Hall on July 23. In his speech on July 16, Coughlin called Roosevelt a liar and a communist, referring to him as "Franklin Doublecross Roosevelt."

At the Union Party convention at Municipal Stadium in Cleveland on August 16, Coughlin endorsed the party's presidential candidate, House Representative William Lemke. Coughlin fainted near the end of his speech. In an August 16 Boston Post article, Coughlin referred to Kennedy as the "shining star among the dim 'knights' in the [Roosevelt] Administration".

Coughlin promised his radio audience that he would retire from broadcasting if he failed to deliver nine million votes for Lemke; he only received 850,000 votes. Roosevelt won the election on November 5 by a landslide. According to a 2021 study in the American Economic Review, Coughlin's criticisms did reduce Roosevelt's share of votes versus the 1932 election. After the election, both the Union Party and its parent organization, the NUSJ, disbanded; Coughlin took a two-month retirement from Golden Hour.

After Bishop Gallagher died in January 1937, Pope Pius XI replaced him with Edward Mooney, the first Archbishop of Detroit. Coughlin then left retirement to return to Golden Hour, in memory of Gallagher. In October 1937, Mooney rebuked Coughlin for casting aspersions on Roosevelt's sanity over his nomination of U.S. Senator Hugo Black to the U.S. Supreme Court.

=== 1938 ===
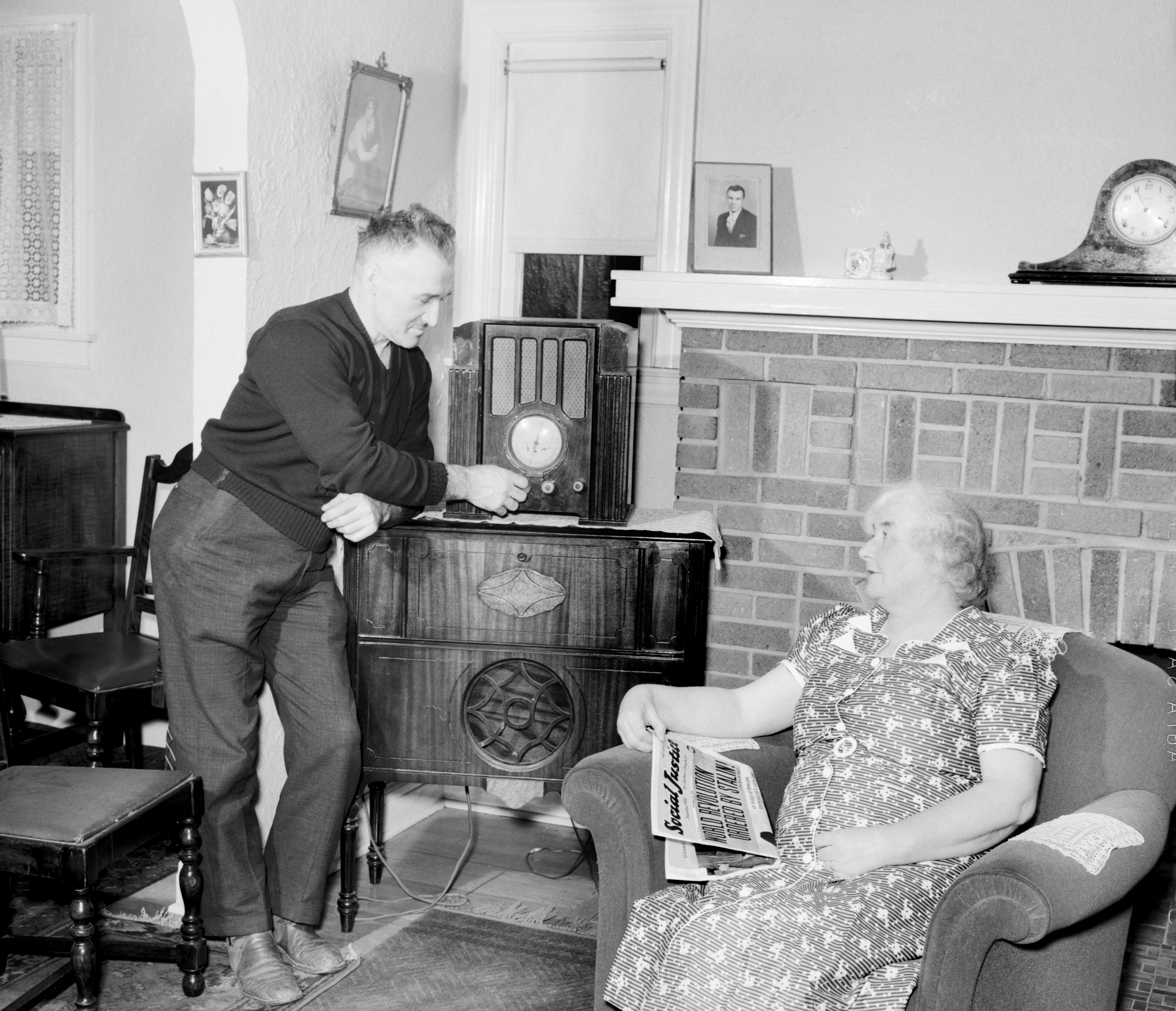
Couple listening to Golden Hour and reading Social Justice magazine. Photograph by Arthur Siegel.

By 1938, Golden Hour was being broadcast to a peak of 58 affiliates. In May 1938, Coughlin called for a "crusade against the anti-Christian forces of the Red Revolution" in Social Justice. That led him to found a new organization, the Christian Front. Its membership numbered several thousand. Unlike the NUSJ, the Christian Front membership was mainly of Irish-American men in New York City and other eastern cities.

On November 9 and 10, 1938, Nazi organizations and sympathizers attacked Jewish businesses and synagogues throughout Germany in what became known as the Kristallnacht. When the owner of WMCA in New York, Donald Flamm, saw the preliminary script for the November 20 broadcast of Golden Hour, he immediately demanded that Coughlin change inflammatory references to Jews. However, Flamm did not get to view the final script.

On the November 20 broadcast, Coughlin deflected blame from the Nazis for Kristallnacht. He referred to 'millions' of Christians who had allegedly been murdered in the Soviet Union by its government. Speaking of Germany, Coughlin said, "Jewish persecution only followed after Christians first were persecuted." After the broadcast finished, the WMCA booth announcer said, "Unfortunately, Father Coughlin has uttered many misstatements of fact."

After the broadcast, WMCA, WIND and WJJD all demanded advance copies of the script for the November 27 program. When Coughlin failed to deliver them, all three stations canceled it. Flamm remarked that the show "was calculated to stir up religious and racial hatred and dissension in this country." Coughlin then pulled all the future broadcasts from the three stations, accusing them of being under "Jewish ownership". (Note: WHN, also in New York City, had dropped the program several weeks earlier; as a result, Coughlin's programs were only broadcast on part-time Newark station WHBI.) In the December 5 issue of Social Justice, Coughlin wrote a column that plagiarized portions of a 1935 speech by the German Propaganda Minister Joseph Goebbels.

On December 14, Cardinal George Mundelein, archbishop of Chicago, issued the first formal condemnation of Coughlin by the Catholic hierarchy. Mundelein said that Coughlin was: "...not authorized to speak for the Catholic Church, nor does he represent the doctrine or sentiments of the Church."

Four days later, thousands of Coughlin's followers, many associated with the Christian Front, picketed WMCA's studios in protest. Some of them yelled antisemitic statements, such as "Send Jews back where they came from in leaky boats!" and "Wait until Hitler comes over here!" The protests at WMCA continued for 38 weeks. Coughlin attended some of the protests.

While the Federal Communications Commission wondered whether they could legally sideline Father Coughlin, the National Association of Broadcasters changed its code of ethics in July 1939, to bar the sale of airtime for the presentation of controversial issues except in political races.

Later court decisions found that although the First Amendment protected free speech, it did not necessarily apply to broadcasting because the radio spectrum was a "limited national resource" and as a result was regulated as a publicly owned commons.

When Coughlin's operating permit was denied, he was temporarily silenced. Coughlin worked around the new restrictions by purchasing air time and playing his speeches via transcription. However, having to buy the weekly air time on individual stations severely reduced his reach and also strained his financial resources. (Note: During this period, Golden Hour typically ran in intervals of 13 to 17 weeks per contract with occasional hiatuses in between.)

=== 1939 ===
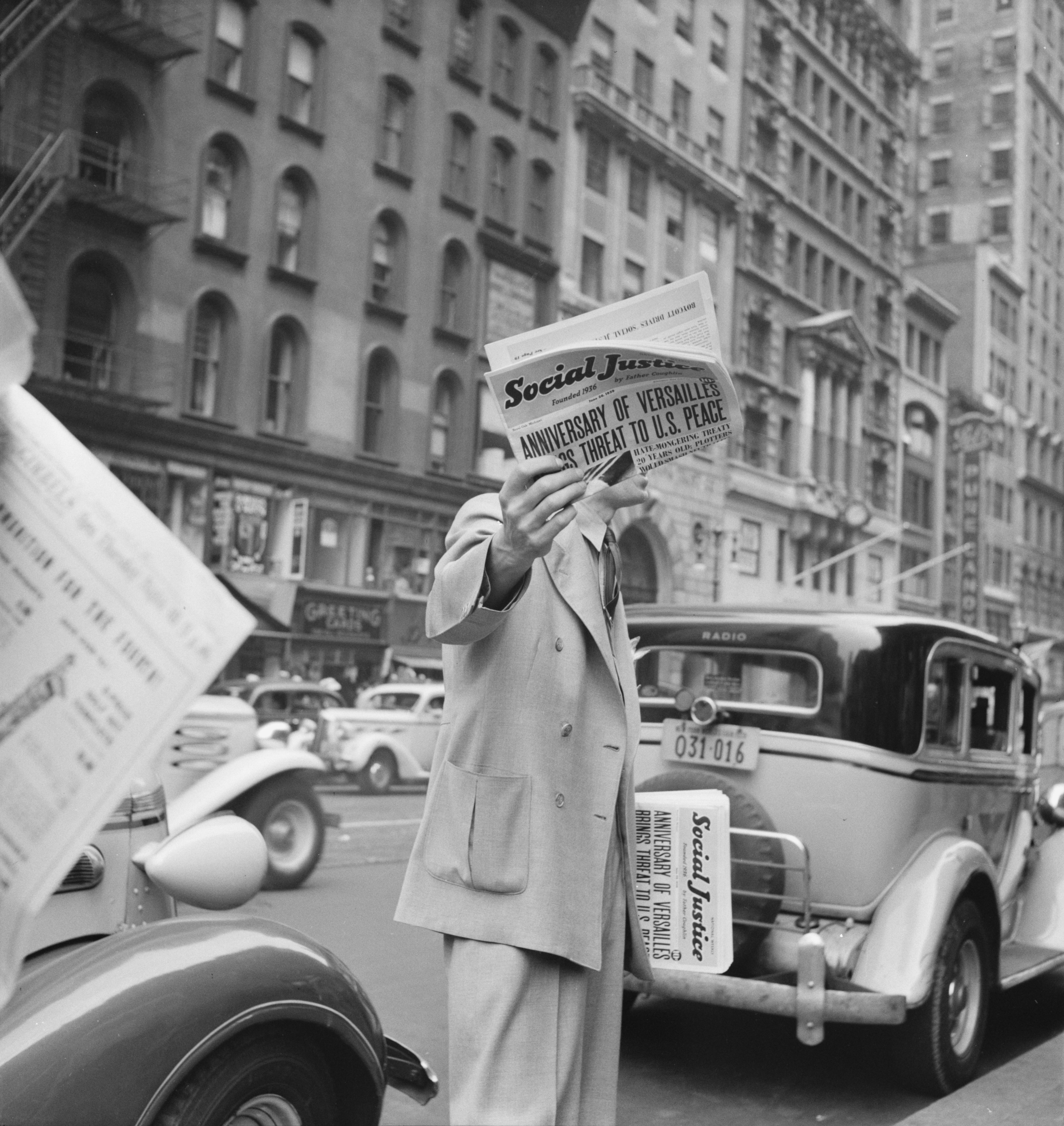
Social Justice magazine on sale in New York City (1939)

In 1939, the Institute for Propaganda Analysis used Coughlin's radio talks to illustrate propaganda methods in their book The Fine Art of Propaganda, which was intended to show propaganda's effects against democracy. Coughlin was praised in January 1939 by Regime Fascista, an Italian newspaper aligned with the fascist government of Italy.

After the outbreak of World War II in Europe in September 1939, Coughlin appealed to Golden Hour listeners to travel to Washington, D.C. as "an army of peace". His aim was to stop the repeal by Congress of the Neutrality Acts, a series of arms embargoes passed during the 1930s to ensure American neutrality in a European conflict. This call led Coughlin's opponents to accuse him of stoking incitement bordering on civil war.

Coughlin's call for a march on Washington finally motivated the National Association of Broadcasters (NAB) to take action against Golden Hour. Fearing FCC intervention, NAB formed a self-regulating Code Committee that limited the sale of air time to controversial individuals. The Committee created a code, which was ratified in October 1939, that required all radio broadcasters to submit their scripts to the radio stations for review before broadcast. Stations that did not comply with the code faced the threat of license revocation. This code was drafted specifically as a response to Coughlin and Golden Hour. WJR, WGAR and the Yankee Network, all of which carried Golden Hour, threatened to quit the NAB over the new code, but eventually adopted it. (Note: Only four stations rescinded their memberships to the NAB, all of them owned by Elliott Roosevelt.)

=== 1940 to 1942 ===
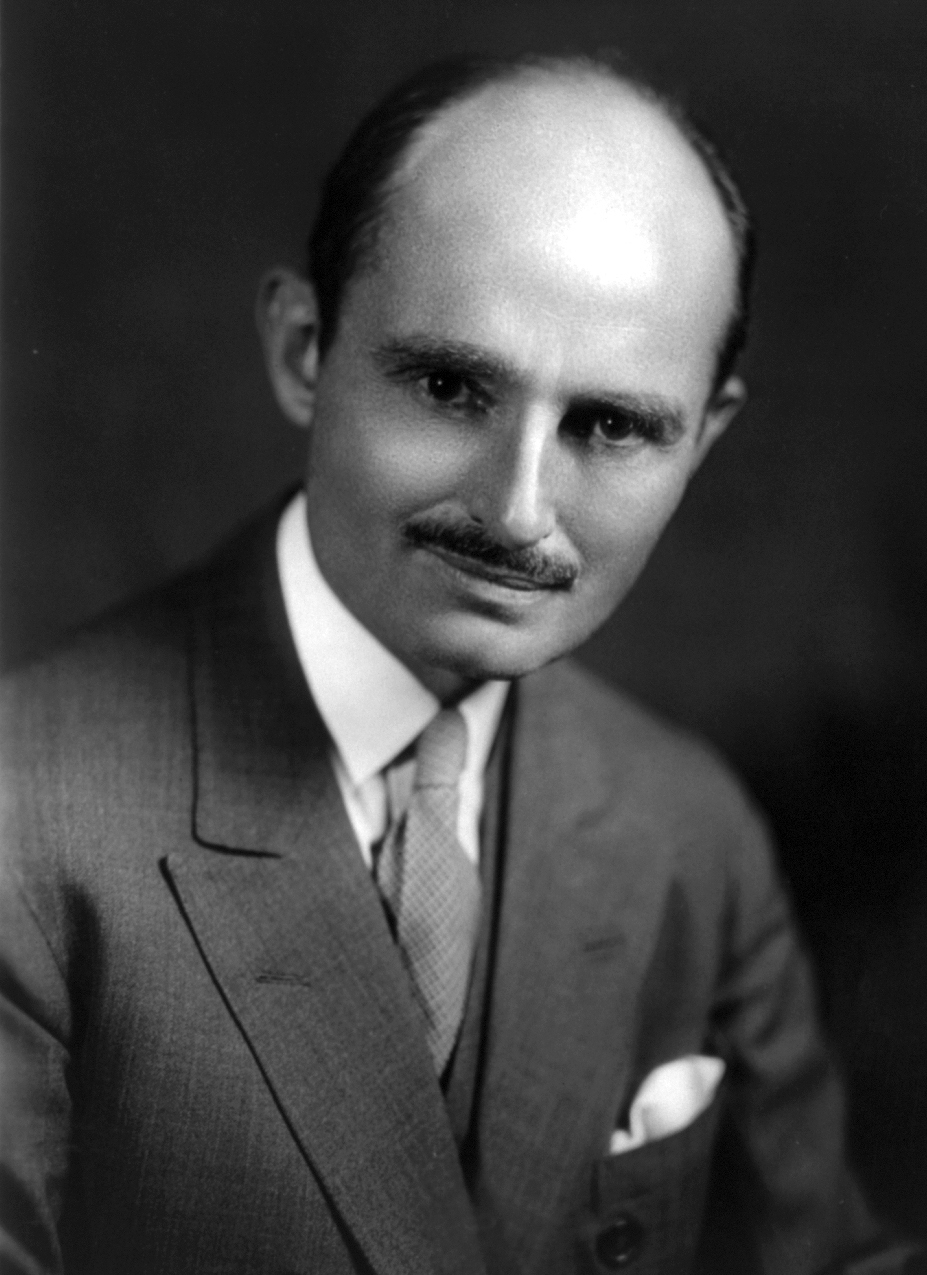
U.S. Attorney General Francis Biddle

In January 1940, the Federal Bureau of Investigation (FBI) raided the Brooklyn headquarters for the Christian Front, arresting 17 men on charges of plotting to overthrow the U.S. government. Coughlin then issued a statement, saying that while he was not a member of the Christian Front and disavowed violence, he did not disassociate himself from the group. He called the Front "pro-American, pro-Christian, anti-Communist and anti-Nazi". The trials for the 17 men ended in acquittals and hung juries; one of the defendants took his own life.

Both Coughlin and renowned aviator Charles Lindbergh would serve as the lead spokesmen for the isolationist America First Committee.

In the September 23, 1940, issue of Social Justice, Coughlin announced that he was cancelling Golden Hour, forced "...by those who control circumstances beyond my reach". Coughlin now had to rely on Social Justice to reach his followers. In 1940, reversing his previous position, Kennedy attacked Coughlin's isolationism. After the December 1941 Japanese attack on Pearl Harbor and the U.S. declaration of war against the Axis Powers, anti-interventionist movements rapidly lost public support. Isolationists such as Coughlin were tagged as enemy sympathizers.

In September 1941, Coughlin's request for a passport would be denied by the U.S. State Department, which classified him as "reported pro-Nazi." Coughlin also denounced the entry of the United States into World War II following the bombing of Pearl Harbor, claiming that Jews had planned the war for their own benefit and had conspired to involve the United States. Coughlin's comments after the bombing of Pearl Harbor and changing public sentiment would give the U.S. an opportunity to restrict Coughlin's political activities. In 1942, the FBI would raid Coughlin's church and seize all parish records and personal papers.

On April 14, 1942, U.S. Attorney General Francis Biddle wrote a letter to Postmaster General Frank Walker, suggesting that he revoke the second-class mailing privilege of Social Justice. Using the Espionage Act of 1917 as its legal justification, Walker temporarily suspended the mailing permit for Social Justice on April 14. Walker scheduled a hearing on its permanent suspension for April 29, later postponed until May 4. Unable to mail Social Justice to its subscribers, Coughlin was confined to distributing it by private delivery trucks only in the Boston area.

Biddle also convened a federal grand jury to consider sedition charges against Social Justice and Coughlin. Biddle asked banker Leo Crowley, a Roosevelt appointee, to offer a deal to Archbishop Mooney; the US Justice Department would not prosecute Coughlin if he closed Social Justice and stopped all his political activities.

On May 1, Mooney ordered Coughlin to confine himself only to the pastoral duties of the Shrine of the Little Flower and cease all non-pastoral activities. The alternative was being defrocked from active ministry and federal indictment for sedition. Coughlin complied with Mooney's order and Social Justice ceased publication. The May 4 hearing before the Postmaster General was canceled.

== Later life ==
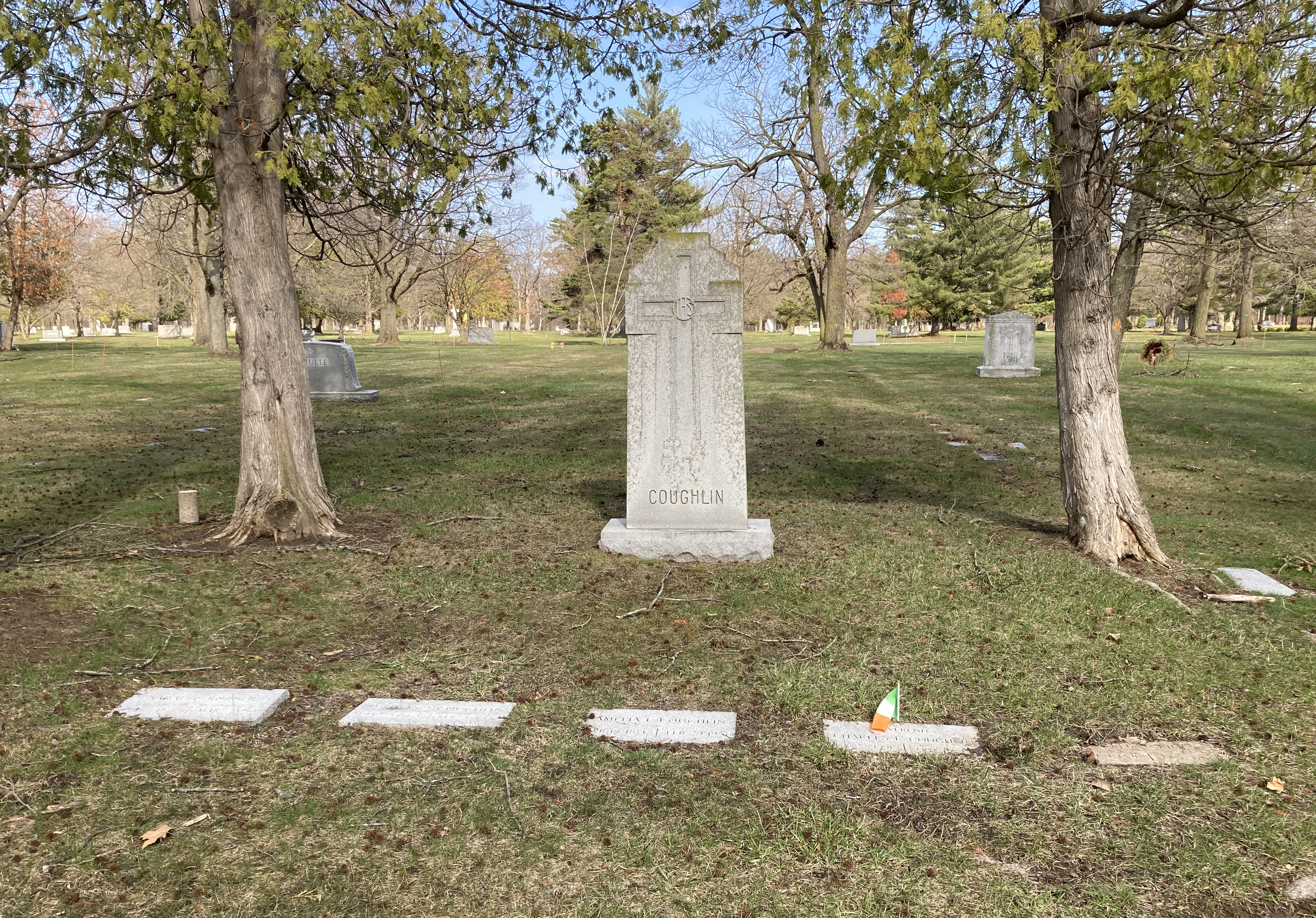
Father Coughlin's grave at Holy Sepulchre Cemetery, Southfield, Michigan

Coughlin served as pastor of the Shrine of the Little Flower until his retirement in 1966. During this period, the Archdiocese of Detroit reviewed all of Coughlin's public speeches in advance. In 1951, he attended Richards's funeral. Richards died following a long legal fight to keep his broadcast licenses amid accusations of antisemitism and of using the stations to further his political interests.

Coughlin died in Bloomfield Hills, Michigan, in 1979 at age 88. Church officials stated that he had been bedridden for several weeks. He was buried in the Holy Sepulchre Cemetery in Southfield, Michigan.

Pope Francis designated the Shrine of the Little Flower as a minor basilica in 2015.

== Viewpoints ==
=== Social justice ===
In November 1934, as a "Preamble" for his National Union of Social Justice, Coughlin issued "Sixteen Principles of Social Justice," prominently influenced by the ideas expounded in two Papal Encyclicals on social justice, Pope Leo XIII, Rerum Novarum, and Pius XI, Quadragesimo Anno (Brinkley 86-87, 94, 112, 129-130 & 162). These include liberty of conscience and education, work rewarded by "a just and living wage," "nationalizing public necessities ... too important to be held in the control of private individuals. ...banking, credit and currency, power, light, oil and natural gas and our God-given natural resources;" "upholding the right of private property yet controlling it for the public good;" abolition of the Federal Reserve; abolition of tax-exempt bonds; taxation of wealth; "in the event of war, conscription of wealth as well as men;" "preferring the sanctity of human rights to the sanctity of property rights." (Brinkley 287–288 reprints the complete Preamble).

=== Communism and socialism ===
In January 1930, Coughlin began denouncing socialism and Soviet Communism. In 1933, Coughlin criticized Roosevelt's decision to extend diplomatic recognition by the United States of the Soviet Union.

Coughlin criticized American capitalists, stating that their greed was making communist ideologies attractive to workers. He warned, "Let not the workingman be able to say that he is driven into the ranks of socialism by the inordinate and grasping greed of the manufacturer."

=== Capitalism ===
Despite being considered far-right, Coughlin's views on capitalism were considered to be more significantly radical and left-wing compared to President Franklin Roosevelt, and even included support for more higher minimum wages and nationalization of natural resources and certain institutions.

The historian Michael Kazin wrote that Coughlin's followers saw capitalism and communism as equally evil. They believed that they were defending those people who were joined more by piety, economic frustration, and a common dread of powerful, modernizing enemies than through any class identity. In a 1930 broadcast, Coughlin stated:

“We have lived to see the day that modern Shylocks have grown fat and wealthy, praised and deified, because they have perpetuated the ancient crime of usury under the modern racket of statesmanship.”

Coughlin proclaimed in 1935:

"I have dedicated my life to fight against the heinous rottenness of modern capitalism because it robs the laborer of this world's goods. But blow for blow I shall strike against Communism, because it robs us of the next world's happiness."

The NUSJ's articles of faith included work and income guarantees, the nationalization of key industries, wealth redistribution through increased taxation of the wealthy, federal protection of labor unions, and limiting property rights in favor of government control of the country's assets for public good. Coughlin said:

We maintain the principle that there can be no lasting prosperity if free competition exists in industry. Therefore, it is the business of government not only to legislate for a minimum annual wage and maximum working schedule to be observed by industry, but also so to curtail individualism that, if necessary, factories shall be licensed and their output shall be limited.

One of Coughlin's slogans was "Less care for internationalism and more concern for national prosperity", which appealed to isolationists and many Irish Catholics.

=== Money supply ===
Coughlin spoke about the negative influence of what he termed as "money changers". He also condemned what he called the government "...permitting a group of private citizens to create money..." at the nation's expense. He said that the Great Depression was a "cash famine" and proposed the nationalization of the Federal Reserve System as the solution. In January 1934, Coughlin testified before the US Congress, saying:

"If Congress fails to back up the President in his monetary program, I predict a revolution in this country which will make the French Revolution look silly!" He also said to the Congressional hearing, "God is directing President Roosevelt."

Coughlin urged Roosevelt to use the unlimited coinage of silver to inflate the money supply and reorganize the financial system. The US Government increased investment in silver for a limited period following the American Silver Purchase Act of 1934, which resulted in U.S. silver mines being nationalized between 1934 and 1943 through stamp taxes.

=== Federal Reserve ===
In the 1930s, Coughlin called on Congress to take back control of the money supply from the Federal Reserve Banks. He pointed out that Congress has the authority under Article I of the US Constitution to coin money and regulate its value.

=== Fascism ===
As the 1930s progressed, Coughlin's views changed. Eventually he became "openly antidemocratic", according to the political scientists Steven Levitsky and Daniel Ziblatt, "calling for the abolition of political parties and questioning the value of elections". His views mirrored those of Richards, who held reactionary conservative beliefs.

In 1936, Coughlin expressed sympathy for the fascist governments of Adolf Hitler in Germany and Benito Mussolini in Italy, terming them as an antidote to Communism. A New York Times report from Berlin in 1938 identified Coughlin as "the German hero in America for the moment" with his sympathetic statements towards Nazism as "a defensive front against Bolshevism".

However, in February 1939, when the American Nazi organization the German American Bund held a large rally in New York City, Coughlin immediately distanced himself from them. On Golden Hour, he said:

"Nothing can be gained by linking ourselves with any organization which is engaged in agitating racial animosities or propagating racial hatreds. Organizations which stand upon such platforms are immoral and their policies are only negative."

=== Antisemitism ===
The television producer Norman Lear recounts in his autobiography how Coughlin's radio broadcasts disturbed him deeply at age nine. As a Jew, they made him aware of the widespread antisemitism in American society.

Coughlin believed Jewish bankers were behind the 1917 October Revolution in Russia that brought the Bolsheviks into power, backing the Jewish Bolshevism conspiracy theory. During the last half of 1938, Social Justice printed weekly installments from the 1903 Protocols of the Elders of Zion, a fraudulent antisemitic text.

Coughlin denied being antisemitic on several occasions. However, he received indirect funding from the German government.

In 1984, Coughlin was praised by Holocaust denier Issa Nakhleh.

=== Prohibition ===
Coughlin was critical of Prohibitionism, which he said was the work of "fanatics".

== In popular culture ==
- Sax Rohmer's 1936 novel President Fu Manchu features the character Dom Patrick Donegal, a Catholic priest and radio host, who is based on Coughlin.
- In his 1944 song "Lindbergh", singer Woody Guthrie describes Father Coughlin with "cash in his stomach and Hitler on the brain".
- Coughlin inspired the character of Bishop Prang in Sinclair Lewis's 1935 novel It Can't Happen Here. Prang endorses Buzz Windrip, a character based on Huey Long, who defeats Roosevelt in the 1936 U.S. presidential election and sets up a fascist government.
- Coughlin inspired the character of Father Crighton, the antisemitic radio priest in Arthur Miller's 1945 novel Focus. It was adapted into a movie in 2001.
- The children's author Theodor Seuss Geisel (Dr. Seuss) attacked Coughlin in 1942 in a series of political cartoons.
- The producers of the HBO television series Carnivàle (2003–2005) said that they used Coughlin as a reference for the character of Brother Justin Crowe.
- Philip Roth's 2004 novel The Plot Against America portrays Coughlin as helping the aviator Charles Lindbergh form a pro-fascist U.S. government.

== See also ==
- Frank J. Hogan, ABA president who rebutted Coughlin on the air
- John Francis Cronin – American Roman Catholic priest (1908–1994)
- Archibald John Shaw – Australian Catholic priest and radio pioneer
- Radio propaganda
