= Kendrew Lascelles =

English actor (1935–2022)

- Born: 20 September 1935; Gatley, England
- Died: 1 March 2022 (aged 86); Colorado Springs
- Occupations: Actor; Performer; Writer
- Notable work: The Box (poem); Wait a Minim! (revue)
- Website: dryeyeinthehouse.com

Kendrew Lascelles (20 September 1935 – 1 March 2022) was an English-born actor, performer and writer from South Africa. His works are known for raising the profile of issues of major social conscience, particularly Apartheid and the Vietnam War.

Some of his most notable works include Wait a Minim!, an anti-apartheid revue that he co-wrote and performed; and, The Box, an iconic poem first recited by him on The Smothers Brothers Summer show on the ABC TV network in the summer of 1970, and was later performed by John Denver on his 1971 album Poems, Prayers & Promises. Wait a Minim! brought the Anti-Apartheid Movement to Broadway and the rest of the Western world. The Smothers Brothers Show received four millions contacts and one million letters from fans after The Box was performed by Lascelles on the show.

Lascelles has written four novels, seventeen plays, two produced screenplays, four musicals, a television mini-series, and four anthologies of poems. His performance background is in comedy, revue, drama, and dance. Lascelles' writing style entertains and informs, bringing irreverence and humor from his comedy for revue and television. He has a background in classical Checetti Dance and performance. His plays have been published and produced, along with his work being recorded by various musical artists and broadcast on networks that include the BBC and networks in the United States.

== Early life and education ==
Lascelles was born in Gatley, England near Greater Manchester in the United Kingdom on 20 September 1935. He moved to South Africa with his family when he was three-years-old, finally settling in KwaZulu-Natal in his late teens. He gravitated to a theatrical career with his first professional role when he was 17 years old. After studying in London, gaining a diploma in Checetti, he returned to South Africa in 1956 and worked with the National Theatre's "Seven against the Sun" and with the Frank Staff 's South African Ballet Company.

== Career ==
=== Early career and "Wait a Minim!" ===
His first paid performance was in 1953 replacing the Principal Dancer, injured two hours before opening night, of a visiting Italian opera company in the dance sequence in their production Faust, starring Giuseppe Di Stefano. Lascelles began working with various ballet companies in Durban, Johannesburg, and Cape Town, with one of his most notable roles being the Wolf in Frank Staff's Peter and the Wolf. He met Leon Gluckman in 1953 during Elizabeth Sneddon's Natal University production of King Lear in which Gluckman played the title role.

After returning from studies in London in 1956, Lascelles continued performing. His first major success came in 1962 when he co-authored with the cast, Gluckman's production of Wait a Minim! which traveled the world for seven years, including two years in the West End and two years on Broadway. At the conclusion of the Minim tour Lascelles settled in the United States where he continued to write and perform.

Lascelles also played numerous roles outside Minim! during his tour with the revue. He co-wrote and performed on the BBC production Time To Breve, a skit based on the Laurence Olivier production Richard III. He also played the Buckingham Palace Flunkie in the 1965 film Help! starring The Beatles.

=== 1970s – "The Box," The Dean Martin Show and Golddiggers ===
During and immediately after his work with Minim!, Lascelles appeared as a guest on various talk shows, including David Frost, Steve Allen, and Ed Sullivan. After settling in the United States, Lascelles began writing scripts for television, most notably the Smothers Brothers and The Dean Martin Show. He continued to appear on television and talk shows throughout the 1960s and 70s as a popular counter-culture icon.

Lascelles wrote "The Box" in 1970. The iconic poem was first performed by Lascelles on the Smothers Brothers Summer Show on ABC the same year. A few weeks later, John Denver appeared on the show and asked Lascelles if he could perform The Box, later recording it for his 1971 album "Poems, Prayers & Promises." Burl Ives attempted a deal to record the song; however, the deal fell through when Ives realized it was already released on the flip side of a 45 by Lascelles. "When All the Laughter Dies in Sorrow," the song from the other side of the 45, was later recorded by Chicago as part of its 1971 album Chicago III. Lascelles received over one million letters from fans after he first performed the poem in 1970. Lascelles gave a follow-up recitation of The Box on the Smothers Brothers in August 1971. Lascelles also released an anthology of poetry in 1973.

Lascelles was a staff writer and occasional performer for the Smothers Brothers Show and Dean Martin's Golddiggers in 1972–73. One of his most famous roles was that of Harry Nine Lives with Dean Martin and Peter Sellers. He also expanded his film career in the 1970s with numerous movie roles. He played the role of Owen in the 1974 Roger Corman produced film Candy Stripe Nurses. Lascelles also played the role of Nonus in the Donald Cammell film The Argument, a movie filmed in 1971 and not released until 1998.

=== 1980s-90s, theatre and playwriting ===
Lascelles was involved in numerous productions at the Mark Taper Forum in Los Angeles in the early 1980s. Lascelles was involved in several productions at Gordon Davidson's Mark Taper Forum in Los Angeles in the early 1980s. "Waterhole" was first produced at the Mark Taper Forum under the title "Legends" directed by Robert Egan and then at the Actor's Theatre at Louisville's Humana Festival as "Waterhole".

He wrote Exclusive Circles; it received a reading with Alfre Woodard directed by Robert Egan at the Mark Taper Forum – it received a second reading at the New York Actors Studio and monitored by Elia Kazan; it was finally produced at the Denver Center Theatre Company with Lascelles playing the role of Bossie. He also played the role of Doc in the 1982 production of Sam Shepard's The Tooth of Crime. His work in theatre in the Los Angeles area continued with performances of Trophy Hunters at the Company of Angels Theater where he played the role of Lang. Lascelles also starred in the one-man-show of Samuel Beckett's Molloy at the UCLA Theater. He also performed alongside Susan Tyrell in a production of Tigers performed in Laurel Canyon (Los Angeles).

From 1985 to 1987, Lascelles spent some time with the Denver Centre Theatre Company as playwright. The company produced Trophy Hunters first and then in the following year Exclusive Circles in which Lascelles performed the role of Bossie. The company also produced Samuel Beckett's Waiting for Godot in which Lascelles played Lucky.

Lascelles also met Michael Butler in the late 70s and was commissioned with Leon Gluckman to develop the musical Reggae. They worked on the project in Jamaica until Gluckman's death. The production eventually was brought to the Biltmore Theatre Broadway in 1980 with a number of additional writers contributing.

=== 2000s, novels and writing ===
Lascelles continued to make appearances on U.S. television until he left to spend more time writing. He adapted Arthur Miller's 1945 novel "Focus" to screen. Released in 2001, Focus starred William H. Macy, Laura Dern, David Paymer, and Meat Loaf. Miller was first approached in 1994 about turning the novel into a movie, but was hesitant to do so. It was only after he read the script written by Lascelles that he agreed to let the film be made. It was produced by Robert A. Miller, Michael R. Bloomberg, and directed by Neal Slavin.

Lascelles wrote the script for the film The Aryan Couple, a drama produced and directed by John Daly and released in 2004. It starred Martin Landau, Caroline Carver, Kenny Doughty, and Judy Parfitt. It won numerous awards at the Beverly Hills Film Festival in 2005, including the Golden Palm Award, Best Director, Best Producer, and the jury award for Best Feature.

Lascelles is the author of four novels. "Tamara Hunney", the first of the four was released in 2008. The book is a post apocalyptic fantasy adventure about an orphaned teenage porn star who travels with a Christian cowboy to find a relative in Denver. In 2010 he published "A Child's Guide to Heresy," sometimes referred to as "The Great Yorkshire Witch Trial of 1249," which won the Pacific Book Award for Occult Fiction in 2015. The novel is a contemporary fantasy about Church and the Occult in 13th century England. In 2010 he released his third book, "Blood Oasis," a novel set in Darfur juxtaposing the regional culture with Western expectations. "A Child's Guide to Heresy" was adapted for stage in 2011 at the Pittsburgh Playhouse with Lascelles also playing a role in the performances. His fourth novel, Cradles of Eden, was published by Blurb.com in 2014.

== Bibliography ==
=== Poems ===
| Year | Title | Notes |
|---|---|---|
| 1971 | The Box | Recorded by Lascelles and later recorded by John Denver, Jack Lemmon, and Peter Lawford |
| 1971 | When All the Laughter Dies in Sorrow | Recorded by Chicago and used as the title for the autobiography of Lance Rentzel |
| 1973 | Earth Fungus and the Stuff of Stars | Anthology of poetry, recorded by United Artists |

=== Novels ===
| Year | Title | Original publisher | ISBN | Notes |
|---|---|---|---|---|
| 1970 | Trophy Hunters | Stanley Richards | N/A | Best short plays of 1970 |
| 1973 | Tigers | Stanley Richards | N/A | Best short plays of 1973 |
| 2008 | A Child's Guide To Heresy | Blurb.com | ASIN B00439GKDK | Novel, stage, musical format. |
| 2008 | Tamara Hunney | Blurb.com | ISBN 978-1-4251-3398-6 | First of an apocalyptic world trilogy |
| 2010 | Blood Oasis | Blurb.com | ASIN B0045EOJEU | Novel, stage, and screenplay format |
| 2014 | Cradles of Eden | Blurb, Inc. | | Novel and screenplay format |
| 2014 | The Box | Blurb, Inc. | ISBN 978-0-8402-8079-4 | Iconic anti-war poem |

== Filmography ==
=== Theatre ===
Select theatre productions/performances

| Year | Movie/TV Show | Role | Notes |
|---|---|---|---|
| 1953 | King Lear | Oswald | Elizabeth Sneddon production, Natal University |
| 1956 | The Rivals | Faukland | Intimate Theatre, Johannesburg |
| 1957 | Peter and the Wolf | Wolf | Frank staff South African Ballet Company |
| 1957 | Apollo '57 | Lead | Frank staff South African Ballet Company |
| 1957 | Seven Against the Sun | Jock | Originating production, National Theatre |
| 1958 | Grab me a Gondola | Newsman | Brook Theatre, Johannesburg |
| 1959 | Thieves' Carnival | Flute player | Alexander Theatre, Johannesburg |
| 1959 | The Miracle Worker | Doctor | Alexander Theatre, Johannesburg |
| 1960 | Gershwin Interludes | Principal dancer | Brook Theatre, Johannesburg |
| 1960 | Irma la Deuce | Frangipane | Brook Theatre, Johannesburg |
| 1960 | The Fantastiks | Mute | Intimate Theatre, Johannesburg |
| 1962–69 | Wait a Minim! | Various | International tour |
| 1962 | Minim Export | Various | Alexander Theatre, Johannesburg |
| 1963 | Minim Bili | Various | Intimate Theatre, Johannesburg |
| 1970 | Trophy Hunters | – | Writer & producer |
| 1980 | Malloy | Malloy | UCLA Theatre, California |
| 1980 | Reggae | – | Story and book co-writer |
| 1987 | Waterhole | – | Producer |
| 1988 | Exclusive Circles | Bossie | Denver Center Theater Company |
| 1988 | Waiting for Godot | Lucky | Denver Center Theatre Company |
| 2011 | A Child's Guide to Heresy | Tannegut | Pittsburgh Playhouse Theatre |

=== Film and television ===
Select film and television credits

| Year | Movie/TV Show | Role | Notes |
|---|---|---|---|
| 1964 | Help! | Buckingham Palace Flunkie | Film |
| 1966 | The Ed Sullivan Show | Self | Appeared as guest |
| 1972 | Smothers Brothers | Staff writer | Cameo performer |
| 1973 | The Dean Martin Show | Staff writer | Cameo performer |
| 1973 | Gold Diggers | Staff writer | Cameo performer |
| 1973 | Death Takes a Dark Trip | Poet | NBC production |
| 1974 | The Steve Allen Show | Guest | |
| 1974 | Candy Stripe Nurses | Owen | Comic cameo |
| 1974 | The Wide World of Mystery | Male poet | Actor in episode "Death Is a Bad Trip" |
| 1976 | Malloy | Malloy | Bill Snell production |
| 1984 | Sunday Night Live | Self | Played self in reading of poem "The Box" |
| 1999 | The Argument | Nonus | Short film produced by David Cammell |
| 2001 | Focus | – | Screenwriter, adapted novel to film |
| 2004 | The Aryan Couple | – | Writer. Numerous awards at the 2005 Beverly Hills Film Festival. |

== Personal life ==
Outside of his professional arts, Lascelles was an avid painter. In a 2015 interview he stated that he painted as a hobby to get him through the times when he has writer's block. He was a keen horseman and enthusiast of U.S. horse culture, which features in most of his paintings. He considered himself a bit of a hermit writer and most of his friends were horses.
