= Candy Stripe Nurses =

- Theatrical release poster
- Directed by: Alan Holleb
- Written by: Alan Holleb
- Produced by: Julie Corman
- Starring: Candice Rialson; Robin Mattson
- Cinematography: Randall Robinson
- Edited by: Allan Holzman
- Music by: Thompson & Tabor
- Production company: New World Pictures
- Distributed by: New World Pictures
- Release date: September 25, 1974 (Los Angeles)
- Running time: 77 minutes
- Country: United States
- Language: English

Candy Stripe Nurses is a 1974 American comedy film written and directed by Alan Holleb, and starring Candice Rialson. Produced and distributed by New World Pictures, it was the last in their popular "nurses cycle" of films that commenced with The Student Nurses (1970).

== Plot ==
Three high school girls work as volunteer candy stripe nurses at Oakwood Hospital. Free-loving Sandy (Candice Rialson) meets a famous rock star, Owen Boles (Kendrew Lascelles), and tries to cure him of his sexual problems. Uptight Dianne (Robin Mattson), who wants to be a doctor, has an affair with Cliff (Rod Haase), a star college basketball player who is being given speed by one of the hospital's doctors, and tries to expose the malpractice. Juvenile delinquent Marisa (Maria Rojo) has an affair with Carlos (Roger Cruz), who is falsely accused of taking part in a gas station hold up, and tries to prove his innocence.

== Cast ==
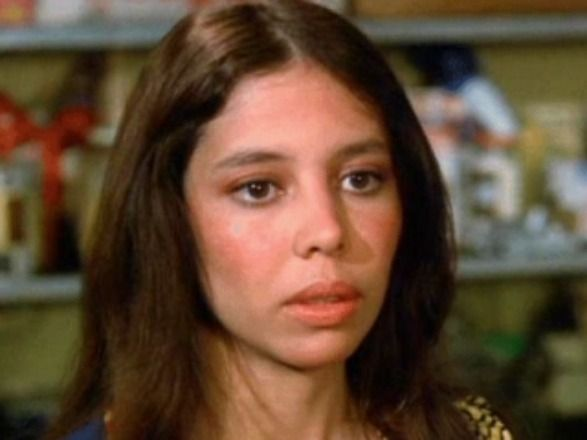
María Rojo in one of the trailers for the film

- Candice Rialson as Sandy
- Robin Mattson as Dianne
- María Rojo as Marisa
- Roger Cruz as Carlos
- Rod Haase as Cliff Gallagher
- Richard Gates as Wally
- Don Keefer as Dr. Wilson
- Kendrew Lascelles as Owen Boles
- Tara Strohmeier as Irene

== Production ==
Director Allan Holleb had recently graduated from UCLA. Julie Corman gave him the job on this film after being impressed by a short film he had made, Heavenly Star. Holleb later said "I found out they had taken a poll at a local high school. They sent someone out with a list of 30 or so titles and Candy Stripe Nurses got the most votes...They wanted a little social consciousness, a little romance, a little comedy and a little sex. Another requirement was they wanted a sex clinic. I don't know why!"

The lead role went to Candice Rialson. "Candice just stood out," recalled Julie Corman. "It wasn't like we were down to the wire and needed someone at the last minute. We really wanted her from the beginning."

One of the leads is credited as "Maria Rojo" and is commonly assumed to be the famous Mexican actress of the same name. However this is reportedly not true and it is a different actress.

A small role was given to Sally Kirkland who Holleb says was a friend of Julie Corman's who also worked on casting.

The movie downplayed the political element that featured in earlier nurses films in favour of humour, although it was still there.

=== Filming ===
The film was shot at a hospital in Burbank. Holleb says Julie Corman gave the board of directors an expurgated copy of the script under the title of Angels of Mercy to get permission.

Barbara Peeters was second unit director. According to Corman biographer Beverly Gray, it was Peeters who shot the sex scene in the gym involving Robin Mattson.

Holleb says the hospital was at 95% capacity during the shoot, leading to frequent clashes between staff and crew. He says while shooting a scene in a linen closet with a topless Candice Rialson, someone from the linen service came in and saw her. Then an un-expurgated copy of the script was found and the unit was kicked out of the hospital. They had to move to another location, a former clinic, which did not match the original hospital. Holleb got the art director to put up a sign saying "this way to the new west wing" to justify the completely new look.

== Release ==
The film was released on a double bill in some cities with The Swinging Cheerleaders.

It was the last in the New World cycle of "nurse's pictures." Holleb later joked, "I like to think I killed the genre."

Diabolique magazine said that "Rialson is vivacious and cheerful, delivering comic lines with aplomb and seeming almost wholesome as she constantly takes her clothes and off hops into bed with various men – she makes nudity and sex appear like natural, clean fun, never sleazy; you only wish she had a better storyline."

Screem magazine argued the film "showed that the nurse genre was all but played out: the three protagonists hardly interact with each other, and the medically-related aspects of the film's plot are minimal (the heroines aren’t even full-fledged nurses this time)."

Filmink called it "a flawed movie, particularly suffering from the fact that the leads play hospital volunteers rather than nurses, and thus have less status. Furthermore, Maria Rojos seems to be off in her own movie." However it said the film "has plenty of energy, a bright theme song, Dick Miller playing a heckler, and most of all, some splendid performances from Rialson and Mattson" nothing that Matton's "romance with the jock is one of the best in the series; their seduction scenes in the gym are downright hot."

== See also ==
- List of American films of 1974

== Bibliography ==
- Bass, Ari (Fall 1993). "In Search of the Drive In Diva - Candice Rialson, New World's Legendary B Movie Goddess Steamed Up". Femme Fatale. Vol. 2, no. 2.
