= Juan Ruiz Anchía =

Spanish cinematographer (born 1949)

- Born: June 12, 1949 (age 77); Bilbao, Spain
- Other names: Juan Ruiz Anchia; Juan Antonio Ruiz Anchía; Juan Ruiz-Anchia; Juan Ruiz-Anchía; Juan Ruiz.Anchia
- Years active: 1970–2013

Juan Ruiz Anchía (born June 12, 1949) is a Spanish cinematographer.

== Background ==
Anchía attended the Escuela Official de Cinematografia in Madrid, graduating in 1972, followed by a graduate in the AFI Conservatory with a Master in Visual Arts as a Director of Photography in 1981.

His AFI television movie, Miss Lonelyhearts (1983), won the Cannes Film Festival for Best Foreign Film.

== Filmography ==
=== Feature film ===
Year	Title	Director
1975	Un informe para una academia	Carles Mira
1981	Reborn	Bigas Luna
1982	Pares y nones	José Luis Cuerda
1982	Crónica del alba. Valentina	Antonio José Betancor
1983	Soldados de plomo	José Sacristán
1983	1919: Crónica del alba	Antonio José Betancor
1984	The Stone Boy	Christopher Cain
1984	Maria's Lovers	Andrei Konchalovsky
1984	Gringo mojado	Ricardo Franco
1985	That Was Then... This Is Now	Christopher Cain
1986	At Close Range	James Foley
1986	Where the River Runs Black	Christopher Cain
1987	House of Games	David Mamet
1987	Surrender	Jerry Belson
1988	The Seventh Sign	Carl Schultz
1988	Things Change	David Mamet
1989	Lost Angels	Hugh Hudson
1990	The Last of the Finest	John Mackenzie
1990	Naked Tango	Leonard Schrader
1991	Dying Young	Joel Schumacher
1991	Liebestraum	Mike Figgis
1992	Glengarry Glen Ross	James Foley
1993	A Far Off Place	Mikael Salomon
1993	Mr. Jones	Mike Figgis
1994	The Jungle Book	Stephen Sommers
1995	Two Bits	James Foley
1996	The Adventures of Pinocchio	Steve Barron
1996	The Disappearance of Garcia Lorca	Marcos Zurinaga
1998	Mararía	Antonio José Betancor
1999	The Corruptor	James Foley
2000	The Crew	Michael Dinner
2001	New Port South	Kyle Cooper
2001	Focus	Neal Slavin
2002	No Good Deed	Bob Rafelson
2003	Confidence	James Foley
2003	Off the Map	Campbell Scott
2004	Spartan	David Mamet
2004	Voces inocentes	Luis Mandoki
2007	September Dawn	Christopher Cain
2008	Sleepwalking	William Maher
2009	I Come with the Rain	Tran Anh Hung
2010	Bunraku	Guy Moshe
2010	Pure Country 2: The Gift	Christopher Cain
2011	Blackthorn	Mateo Gil

Documentary film

Year	Title	Director	Notes
1976	El desencanto	Jaime Chávarri	With Teo Escamilla
1978	La historia y la vida extraterrestre	Juan García Atienza; Álvaro Saavedra	

=== Television ===
Year	Title	Director	Notes
1983-1985	American Playhouse	Michael Dinner; Michael Fields	Episodes "Miss Lonelyhearts" and "Noon Wine"

TV movies

Year	Title	Director
1984	Single Bars	Harry Winer
2012	Outlaw Country	Michael Dinner; Adam Arkin
2013	Phil Spector	David Mamet

=== Music video ===
Year	Title	Artist	Director
1986	"Live to Tell"	Madonna	James Foley
1987	"What's Going On"	Cyndi Lauper	Andy Morahan
1993	"Bad Girl"	Madonna	David Fincher
