= Dana Valery =

Dana Valery Catalano
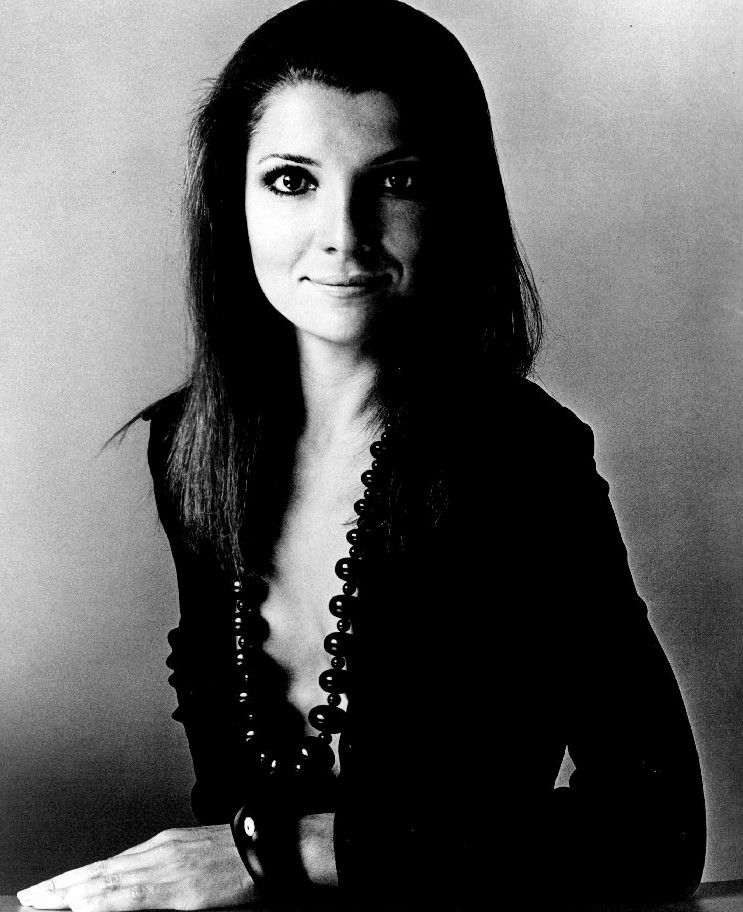
- Valery in 1973

Background information
- Born: Fausta Dana Galli; July 15, 1944 (age 82); Codogno, Italy
- Genres: Traditional pop; soft rock; Northern soul
- Occupations: Singer; actress; therapist; relationship counsellor; hotelier
- Years active: 1962–present
- Labels: CBS; RCA; RCA/Phantom

Dana Valery Catalano (born Fausta Dana Galli; July 15, 1944) is an Italian-born South African-reared singer, actress, and television performer who started her career in the entertainment industry at the age of 16 in Johannesburg, South Africa, where her family immigrated from Italy in 1947.

She has performed on television, radio, Broadway, and in live concert performances worldwide, including major cities such as New York, London, Monte Carlo, Las Vegas, Atlantic City, and Johannesburg. She is the sister of singer and actor Sergio Franchi.

== Stage ==
Valery starred in three productions of the South African musical revue Wait A Minim!: the original 1962 South African production; the 1964 London production; and the Broadway production which ran for 456 performances at the John Golden Theatre from March 7, 1966 – April 15, 1967. Miss Valery recorded Original Cast Albums of all three productions.

== Television ==
In 1965, she appeared on the British television series Ladybirds for ITV Southern England. In it, interviewers Shaw Taylor and Terence Carroll attempt to find out about the individual behind the image. She appeared on several different television shows in the United States in the 1960s and 1970s. One such appearance was as a panelist on the episode of the television game show, What's My Line? (on which she was a recurring panelist), that featured then-governor of Georgia Jimmy Carter as a contestant.

== Personal life ==
She is married to Peter Catalano, who has worked both as a musician, trained at the Brooklyn Conservatory of Music, and as an architect.

== Discography ==
Valery's first US album was an RCA collaboration album with Al Hirt and Boots Randolph titled Horns Of Plenty. Valery recorded a version of the Paul Simon song "You Don't Know Where Your Interest Lies" and released it as a single in January 1967, before Simon & Garfunkel released their version in July 1967 as the B-side to "Fakin' It". Valery's version became a notable song on the Northern soul scene, having been a popular spin at Wigan Casino.

Her solo debut album in the United States was called Not The Flower, But The Root on the Brunswick label in 1972. The Not The Flower, But The Root album has been reissued on CD in Japan with one bonus track. Her follow up was Dana Valery in 1975. The cover artwork shows her wearing black against a black background, resulting in a cameo-like effect. This album can still be found on Internet record stores and auction sites. This album was issued on RCA's custom label Phantom and was produced by Leslie West of Mountain. She recorded ten LP albums, two EPs, and a number of singles in South Africa prior to going abroad. In Johannesburg, Dana won two SARIE awards in (1964 and 1965) for Best Female Vocalist.

=== Albums (LP) ===
- 1962 Everybody's Doin' the Twist – CBS ALD 6562 – South Africa
- 1962 Dan, Dana, and the Diamonds, (Dan Hill, Dana Valery, The Diamonds & Mike Shannon), CBS S.A. (Collaboration)
- 1962 Original South African Cast Album – Wait a Minim! – Gallotone GLP-GALP 1221
- 1963 Two Diamonds, with Mike Shannon – CBS – South Africa
- 1963 This is Dana Valery – CBS ALD 6658 – South Africa
- 1963 All'Italiana – CBS 6694 – South Africa
- n.d. Dan Hill at The Grove,(Featuring Dana Valery & Introducing Una Valli), CBS ALD 6721 – South Africa (Collaboration)
- 1964 Dana – CBS ALD 6747 – South Africa
- 1966 The Exciting Dana Valery – CBS ALD 6825 – South Africa
- 1967 I'll Remember Summer (Arr and Conducted by Dan Hill) – CBS ALD 6969 South Africa
- 1964 Original London Cast Album – Wait a Minim! – Decca SKL 4610 (1964)
- 1966 Original Broadway Cast Album – Wait a Minim! – London AMS 880002 (1966)
- 1971 Horns of Plenty (Collectors Limited Edition) – RCA PRS-372 Collaboration album w/Al Hirt, Boots Randolph, Dana Valery
- 1972 Not The Flower But The Root – Brunswick Records BL 754180 (American Debut Album)
- 1975 Dana Valery – RCA/Phantom BPL1-1124
- 1999 Zodiac Meditation Music – DVC Productions

=== EP albums (45rpm) ===
- n.d. Dana Valery's Great Italian Hits – "Cuando caliente el sol" / "La mezza luna" / "La terza lune" / Dimelo in Settembre" (CBS EXP-2115 South Africa)
- n.d. Tango Italiana – "Tango Italiana" / El Maintenant" / "From Russia With Love" / "This Is My Prayer" (CBS EXP-2124)

=== Singles (45rpm) ===
- 1962 "Hava Nagila" / "Tintarella di Luna" (South Africa CBS SSC-330)
- 1962 "Autumn Concerto" / "Till" (South Africa CBS SSC-331)
- 1963 "No School Tomorrow" (South Africa CBS)
- 1963 "Keep Away From Other Girls (South Africa CBS)
- 1963 "What Now My Love" / "I Wish You Love" (South Africa CBS SSC-431)
- 1964 "Renato" / "Bahia Bossa Nova" (South Africa CBS SSC444)
- 1964 "This Is My Prayer" / "Would I Love You Again" (South Africa CBS SSC-479) & (UK Decca F.11881)
- 1964 "I Wake Up Crying" / "Never Let Go," (UK Decca F.11977)
- 1964 "I'm Leaving It Up to You" (with Charles Jacobie) (South Africa CBS)
- 1964 "The Kind of Boy I Can't Forget" (South Africa CBS)
- 1964 "Poor Boy" (South Africa CBS)
- 1965 "We're Gonna Be Happy" / "Cuore (Heart)," (South Africa CBS SSC-563)
- 1965 "She Doesn't Love You (Half As Much As Me)" / "We're Gonna Be Happy" (UK Decca F.12134)
- 1965 "Tall Man" (backed by the Diamonds) (South Africa CBS)
- 1966 "I Remember Love" (South Africa CBS)
- 1966 "Retreat Song" (South Africa CBS)
- 1967 "Having You Around" / "You Don't Know Where Your Interest Lies" (with Paul Simon, writer and uncredited minor vocal) (US Columbia 44004)
- 1967 "You" / "Imagine," (US Columbia 4-44301) & (South Africa CBS SSC-858)
- 1967 "Having You Around" / "Zabadak" (US Columbia 44389) & (South Africa CBS SSC-330)
- 1967 "You Don't Know Where Your Interest Lies" (CBS) (Recorded in Nashville)
- 1969 "Get in Line Girl" / "Clinging Vine" (US Liberty 56156)
- 1969 "Happy Birthday To Me" / "A Girl Without Love" (US ABC Records 45-11161)
- 1969 "Surround Yourself with Sorrow" / "Breakfast in Bed" (US ABC Records 45–11214)& (US ABC Records AMP 45-15743/15745)
- 1970 "Put Your Hand in the Hand" / "Point of No Return" (US Liberty 56209) & (South Africa Liberty LYS193)
- 1971 "You on My Mind" / "Portofino" (US Brunswick 55464)
- 1972 "I Wanna Pay You Back" (Backed by the Chi-Lites), (US Brunswick 55482)
- 1973 "I'm A Woman Now" / "The Fountain" (US Brunswick 55494)
- 1976 "I'd Love You to Want Me" / "I Never Had It So Good," (UK RCA/Phantom 10316)
- 1976 "Will You Love Me Tomorrow"/"I Never Had It So Good" (UK Phantom 10566), US #95
- 1978 "Du Bist Das Licht in Meiner Welt" (Germany WB 17093)
- 1978 "He Brings Down The Raindrops"/"Those Were The Best Years" (Germany WB 17102)
- 1979 "I Don't Want To Be Lonely"/"Rainbow Connection" (US Scotti Bros. SB 509), US #87
- n.d. "Roses and Rainbows"/"I Gave You My Love" (Philippines Scotti Bros. SB 2002)
- 1981 "Roses And Rainbows"/"I Gave You My Love" (US Scotti Bros. SB-612) & (Germany Scotti Bros. 100-07-093)

== Television appearances ==
- The Ed Sullivan Show – 3 March 1968, WCBS 52min
- The Kraft Music Hall – 17 July 1968, WNBC 52min
- The Kraft Music Hall – 16 October 1968, WNBC 52min
- The Jonathan Winters Show – 20 November 1968, WNBC 57min
- Operation Entertainment – 20 December 1968, WABC 52min
- The Jonathan Winters Show – 16 January 1969, WNBC 57min
- Operation: Entertainment – 31 January 1969, WABC 52min
- The Hollywood Palace – 15 February 1969, WABC 52min
- The Tonight Show with Johnny Carson — 13 June 1969
- The Jimmie Rodgers Show – 16 June 1969, WCBS 52min
- The Liberace Show – 12 August 1969, WCBS 52min
- The Hollywood Palace – 1 November 1969, WABC 52min
- The Ed Sullivan Show – 4 January 1970, WCBS 52min
- The Engelbert Humperdinck Show – 18 February 1970, WABC 52min
- The Ed Sullivan Show – 31 May 1970, WCBS 52min
- The Des O'Connor Show – 2 September 1970, WNBC 52min
- The Mike Douglas Show – 9 August 1974
- What's My Line? – 9 September 1974
- Tattletales – 20–26 June 1975 (with Tim Saunders)
- Musical Chairs - September 1975

== Film ==
- Coach (1978 movie) soundtrack "My Life's a Sing-a-Long"

== See also ==
- Bruce Swedien
- Leonard Feather, The Biographical Encyclopedia of Jazz

== Bibliography ==
- Legends of Rock Guitar by Pete Prown and HP Newquist (1997)
- Pop Annual 1955–1999 by Joel Whitburn (2000)
- Top Pop Singles 1955–1999 by Joel Whitburn (2000)
- Woolfson, Malcolm (1992). But the Melody Lingers On: The "Inside Story" of the Johannesburg Operatic and Dramatic Society-Its Shows, Personalities, Triumphs, and Tribulations. (Perskor, Johannesburg). ISBN 0-628-03393-1
