= Ag Pleez Deddy =

Single by Jeremy Taylor
- B-side: "Jo'burg Talking Blues"
- Released: 1962
- Genre: Folk, children's
- Label: Gallotone PD 7-8531
- Songwriter(s): Jeremy Taylor

"Ag Pleez Deddy" (also known as "The Ballad of the Southern Suburbs") is a South African song written and recorded by Jeremy Taylor, and released in 1962. It was written for the stage show Wait a Minim!, and has been described as the musical's "showpiece". It provides a light-hearted insight into the lives of young white working-class South Africans, whose outlook has absorbed both English-language and Afrikaans influences, along with a fascination with consumer culture. On the surface a children's song, it became broadly popular.

== Content ==
The song was penned in "South African creole English", the vernacular of young, English-speaking South Africans, with liberal sprinklings of Afrikaans words and phrases. The language was that of Taylor's students, to whom he taught Latin in the southern suburbs of Johannesburg. The lyrics are full of references to places, brands and entertainment popular among working-class white South Africans.

In the first four verses, a boy pesters his father to take him and his numerous friends to the drive-in theatre, the funfair, a wrestling match (between the Canadian Ski Hi Lee and the South African Willie Liebenberg), and finally to a distant beach in Durban, with a chorus chanting: "Popcorn, chewing gum, peanuts and bubblegum". The father remains silent until the abortive fifth verse, when he retorts "Voetsek!" ("Clear off!"). When the song resumes, the boy complains that, since his father won't take him out for amusements, he will have to entertain himself by beating up the boys (moer all the outjies) next door.

== Reception ==
The single, described as "insightful", and a "fond classic", became a cause célèbre in South Africa, Rhodesia, Kenya, and Mozambique. It sold more copies in South Africa than any single by Elvis Presley, as well as outselling any previous domestic single. The success of the song led to the popularity and acceptability of political satire in South Africa during later decades.

The song aroused significant controversy, with many Afrikaners unhappy about the mixing of Afrikaans and English in the lyrics, and its "far-from-flattering" representation of working-class whites, although some praised it for its "gutsiness". It was banned from airplay by the South African Broadcasting Corporation, who considered that it violated the principles of apartheid. As Taylor later commented, "The whole concept of separateness applied also to the concept of keeping English and Afrikaans apart, and they wanted the English to be pure English and the Afrikaans to be pure Afrikaans. Then Ag Pleez Deddy comes along, like a mongrel, a bloody street cur. They couldn't stand it."

Post-apartheid, the song was described as "vulgar and base, revealing the raw side of South Africans in all their humour", and "a liberating anthem for hitherto doomed anglophone youth". Gillian Slovo wrote that the song is very familiar with white South Africans who grew up during the apartheid era, saying, "We loved the song's words, the demands of insatiable childhood for zoos and aquariums."

In the longer term, another controversial element of the song proved to be its mention of "Nigger balls". These were a type of gobstopper, and were included in the list of consumer products coveted by the youths, alongside "liquorice, Pepsi-Cola, ginger beer and Canada Dry". Outside this context, the word "nigger" was not widely used in South Africa at the time, or considered unduly offensive; but it was growing increasingly controversial in the United States, and in subsequent years became effectively taboo in all Anglophone countries. When A New Book of South African Verse in English was published by Oxford University Press in 1979, edited by Guy Butler and Chris Mann, the lyrics of "Ag Pleez Deddy" were included but the offending words were altered to "acid-drops", without Taylor's authority and to his great annoyance. However, Taylor himself, when later singing the song in the United States, substituted the term "sugar balls".
