= April Olrich =

English ballerina and actress (1931–2014)

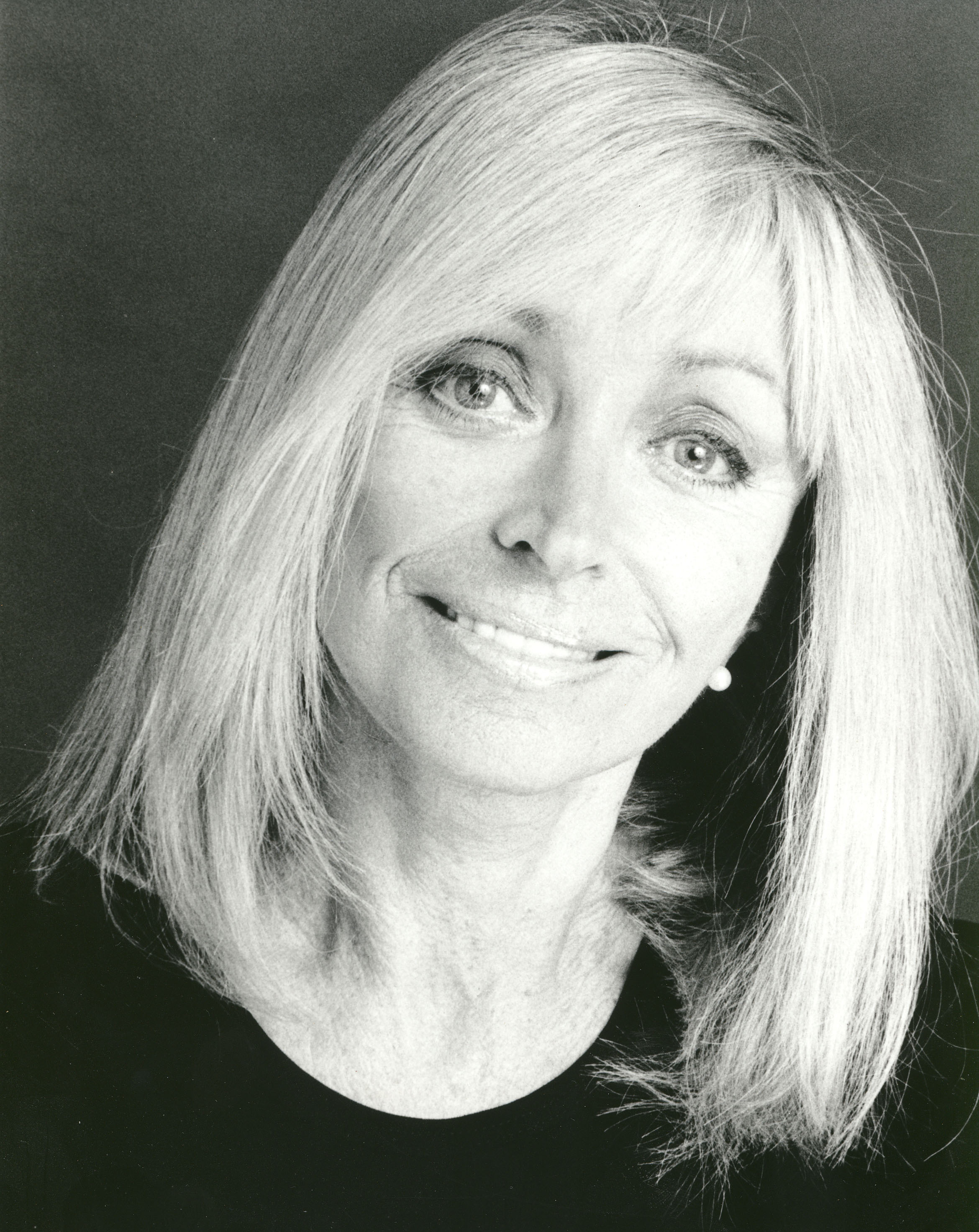
Olrich in 1998

April Olrich (17 July 1931 – 15 April 2014), born Edith April Oelrichs, was an English ballerina and actress, born in Zanzibar, now part of Tanzania.

== Early life ==
Edith April Oelrichs was born in Zanzibar in 1931 (some sources incorrectly give 1933), to an American mother and an English father. Her father was in charge of the Eastern Telegraph Company, a job which saw the family often relocate; As such, she was brought up mostly in South America, although also lived at different times, in the Seychelles and Argentina. She studied ballet in Paris and, aged 13, she joined Colonel Wassily de Basil's Original Ballet Russe in Buenos Aires at the Teatro Colón, dancing with the company all over South America and in New York with George Balanchine.

== Career ==
Olrich joined The Sadler's Wells Ballet (soon to become the Royal Ballet) in 1949 under Ninette de Valois. She danced with the company in London from 1949 to 1954, in The Sleeping Beauty, Les Sylphides, Coppélia, Façade, Mam'zelle Angot, Swan Lake, Cinderella, Checkmate, A Wedding Bouquet, Apparitions, A Mirror for Witches, Bonne-bouche, Ballet Imperial, Giselle, Don Juan, The Three-Cornered Hat, Job, Daphnis and Chloe, Ballabile, Veneziana, Homage to the Queen, Tiresias, and Les Patineurs.

After her ballet career, she remained on the London stage as a performer. Olrich appeared in Pay the Piper (1954–1955), The Balcony (1957), Honeymoon (1957), the musical The Boys from Syracuse (1963), and the South African folk revue Wait a Minim! (1964–1966). She accompanied Wait a Minim! to Broadway from 1966 to 1967. In New York, she won the Whitbread Anglo-American Theatre Award for Outstanding Musical Performance. Theatre critic Frank Rich (then a Harvard undergraduate) admired Olrich's appearance, saying, "Then there is April Olrich, who dances and, when she has nothing else to do, just stands facing the audience flashing a pair of large, sparkling eyes. The eyes are part of a body which also seems to throw off a few sparks from time to time."

She also appeared in many films including Women without Men (1956), Battle of the River Plate (aka Pursuit of the Graf Spee) (1957) Kill Me Tomorrow (1957), Room at the Top (1959), Deadly Record (1959), It's All Over Town (1964), The Skull (1965), Clinic Exclusive (1972), Keep It Up Downstairs (1976), Riding High (1981), and Supergirl (1984). She is probably best known for playing the female lead, Madame Petrovna, opposite Morecambe and Wise in the film The Intelligence Men (1966).

She frequently appeared on British television in both dramatic and comedy roles, most notably an episode of The Avengers (1963), Fresh Fields (1985), She-Wolf of London (1990), and as a game-show panelist in the popular series Whodunnit? (1976).

== Personal life ==
April Olrich married English actor (and her co-star in Wait a Minim!) Nigel Pegram in 1968, on top of Coit Tower in San Francisco.

== Death ==
She died in 2014, in London, aged 82.

There is an annual April Olrich Award for Dynamic Performance, given at the Royal Ballet School in her memory.
