= The American Way (film) =

1986 film by Maurice Phillips

- Directed by: Maurice Phillips
- Written by: Scott Roberts
- Starring: Dennis Hopper; Michael J. Pollard
- Cinematography: John Metcalfe
- Music by: Brian Bennett; Simon Webb
- Distributed by: Miramax Films
- Release date: 1986
- Language: English

The American Way, also known as Riders of the Storm, is a 1986 American science fiction comedy film directed by Maurice Phillips and starring Dennis Hopper and Michael J. Pollard.

== Premise ==
S&M TV is a pirate television station, broadcasting from a B-29 plane by a group of disgruntled Vietnam war veterans. After many years, the crew considers accepting an offer of amnesty, broadcasting legitimately, and going back to more normal lives. However, as the US presidential campaign is starting, the captain of the plane decides S&M has a last job to do: to prevent the pro-war conservative candidate from winning the election.

== Cast ==
- Dennis Hopper as The Captain
- Michael J. Pollard as Tesla
- Eugene Lipinski as Ace
- James Aubrey as Claude
- Al Matthews as Benedict
- William Armstrong as Jerry
- Michael Ho as Minh
- Derek Hoxby as Sam
- Nigel Pegram as Mrs. Westinghouse
- Mark Caven as Don
- Craig Pinder as Irving
- Jeff Harding as Doug
- Linda Lou Allen as Mary
- Norman Chancer as Dr. King
- Gwen Humble as Linda
- Ozzy Osbourne as Himself
- Tara Ward as Donna

== Production ==
Parts of the film were shot at Glen Canyon in Utah.
