= National Union for Social Justice (organization) =

American political movement (1934–1936)

- Leader: Charles E. Coughlin
- Founded: 11 November 1934
- Dissolved: 13 March 1936
- Merged into: Union Party
- Headquarters: 2100 Twelve Mile Rd, Royal Oak, MI 48073
- Newspaper: Social Justice
- Radio program: Hour of Power
- Ideology: Distributism; Solidarism; Reformism; Christian corporatism Anti-capitalism; Anti-communism
- Political position: Syncretic; Fiscal: Left-wing; Social: Far-right
- International affiliation: None

The National Union for Social Justice (NUSJ) was an American political movement formed in 1934 by Charles Coughlin, a Catholic priest and radio host. It heavily criticized communism, capitalism, and the administration of Franklin D. Roosevelt, while also advocating for the nationalization of utilities and banks. The organization dissolved in 1937 after the political party it sponsored, the Union Party, drew less than two percent of the popular vote in the 1936 United States presidential election.

== History ==
The National Union for Social Justice was one of the most powerful movements to challenge Roosevelt's New Deal policies. NUSJ fought for social equality and promoted populist ideologies. Membership was open to all Americans regardless of race, economic background or religious faith. At the height of the Union's popularity, it reached a membership of 7.5 million people, including African Americans, who were registered voters.

Coughlin promoted the National Union for Social Justice by spreading the word on his weekly radio program, Hour of Power, presenting his organization as the opponent of the evils of capitalism and big business.

The National Union for Social Justice also created its own publication, titled Social Justice, in 1936. This publication promoted the ideologies of NUSJ and promoted anti-Semitic themes as well. However, Social Justice did not last long. In 1942, the publication's mail permit was revoked under the Espionage Act of 1917.

The National Union for Social Justice helped create a third party, called the Union Party, formed to challenge Roosevelt in the presidential election of 1936. Its founding members included Father Charles E. Coughlin, activist Francis Townsend, and politician Gerald L. K. Smith. Their goal was to propose a populist alternative to the New Deal reforms made by Roosevelt, as well as to help draw democratic voters away from Roosevelt so a Republican could be voted into office. This short-lived party broke up following the landslide re-election of Franklin D. Roosevelt in 1936.

The National Union for Social Justice and Union Party did not influence the election as they had anticipated, and their political agendas were losing support in the United States. The NUSJ eventually wound down in 1937, largely replaced by the Christian Front, which Coughlin swung even more sharply toward anti-Semitism and praise for Nazi Germany, both before and after the United States' entry into World War II.

== See also ==
- Huey Long
- Share Our Wealth
