= Wait a Minim! =

1962 musical

Wait a Minim! (1962–68) was a musical revue conceived by Leon Gluckman, with original songs by Jeremy Taylor, and a collection of international folk music arranged by Andrew Tracey. Many authentic instruments were played to accompany dances and pantomimes satirizing the national characteristics and political and social eccentricities of many countries. The only spoken words were when the cast was introduced, and in the South African scene where apartheid was ridiculed.

The revue originated in South Africa and toured Southern Rhodesia (now Zimbabwe), and London before opening on Broadway in New York City.

== Production history ==
=== Background and development ===
Andrew and Paul Tracey were the sons of Hugh Tracey, the founder of the International Library of African Music and a man considered "the world's foremost authority on African music" during his lifetime. By 1959, Andrew and Paul performed professionally as the Tracey Brothers and were producing a musical skit comedy radio program in Johannesburg called "The Nutcrackers."

In 1961, Leon Gluckman was producing a show at the Intimate Theatre in Johannesburg when the leading actress broke her leg, leaving him six weeks to find a replacement show. Gluckman commissioned Andrew and Paul to create a musical revue out of the folk song repertoire the brothers had already developed. The revue was eventually called "Wait a Minim."

=== South African debut ===
Wait a Minim opened in Johannesburg on January 17, 1962, at the Intimate Theatre. After a year, the show put on a revival tour called Minimbili. Another iteration of the production called Minim Export played at the Alexander Theatre in Johannesburg for a few more months before the show moved abroad to London.

=== London production ===
After more than two years in Africa, the show moved to London, where it opened at the Fortune Theatre on April 9, 1964.

Devised and directed by Leon Gluckman - Musical arrangements and direction by Andrew Tracey - Costumes by Heather MacDonald-Rouse - Choreography by Frank Staff and Kendrew Lascelles - Lighting and design supervised by Klaus Holm. Cast in London:

- Andrew Tracey
- Paul Tracey
- Jeremy Taylor
- Kendrew Lascelles
- Michel Martel
- Zelide Jeppe
- Jeannette James
- Dana Valery

=== Broadway production ===
After more than two years in London, the show moved to Broadway, where it opened at the John Golden Theatre on 7 March 1966, and ran for 456 performances until 15 April 1967. The U.S. cast included Sarah Atkinson, Kendrew Lascelles, Michel Martel, April Olrich, Nigel Pegram, Andrew Tracey, Paul Tracey, and Dana Valery. It was directed by Leon Gluckman and choreographed by Frank Staff and Kendrew Lascelles. Scenic design was by Gluckman and Frank Rembach, costume design by Heather Macdonald-Rouse, and lighting design by Rembach and Gluckman. Guitar, drums and other instruments were played by Andrew Tracey, Paul Tracey and Nigel Pegram, and trumpet by Kendrew Lascelles. Other members of the cast played percussion instruments. Olrich and Pegram were married for 46 years after meeting in this production.

== Songs on cast recordings ==
=== London recording ===
- This is the Land (1) (Ndinosara Nani? - Hoe Ry Die Boere - Chuzi Mama Gwabi Gwabi - Asubuhi Sana - Jikel' Emaweni)
- Foyo
- The Crow
- Lalirette
- Last Summer
- Hammer Song
- Black-White Calypso
- Opening Knight
- Table Bay
- Ag Pleez Deddy
- This is the Land (2)
- North of the 'Popo'

=== Broadway recording ===
- Amasalela
- Ndinosara Nani?
- Jikele Maweni
- Black-White Calypso
- I Know Where I'm Going
- I Gave My Love a Cherry
- Chuzi Mama Gwabi Gwabi
- Foyo
- London Talking Blues
- Ayama
- The Gumboot Dance
- Hammer Song
- Table Bay
- A Piece of Ground
- Dirty Old Town
- Sir Oswald Sodde
- Johnny Solier
- Skalo-Zwi
- Amasalela

=== South African recording ===
- Hush Little Baby
- I Came Home
- Jo'burg Talking Blues
- I Know Where I'm Going
- I Gave My Love A Cherry
- Black-White Calypso
- Little Sir Hugh
- The Cruel Youth
- The Bold Logger
- The Strangest Dream
- Confession
- The Ballad Of The Southern Suburbs
- Hammer Song
- Single Girl
- Deutsches Weinlied...Watschplattltanz
- Ayama
- This Is South Africa
- Amasalela
