= Social Justice (newspaper) =

American antisemitic newspaper (1936–1942)

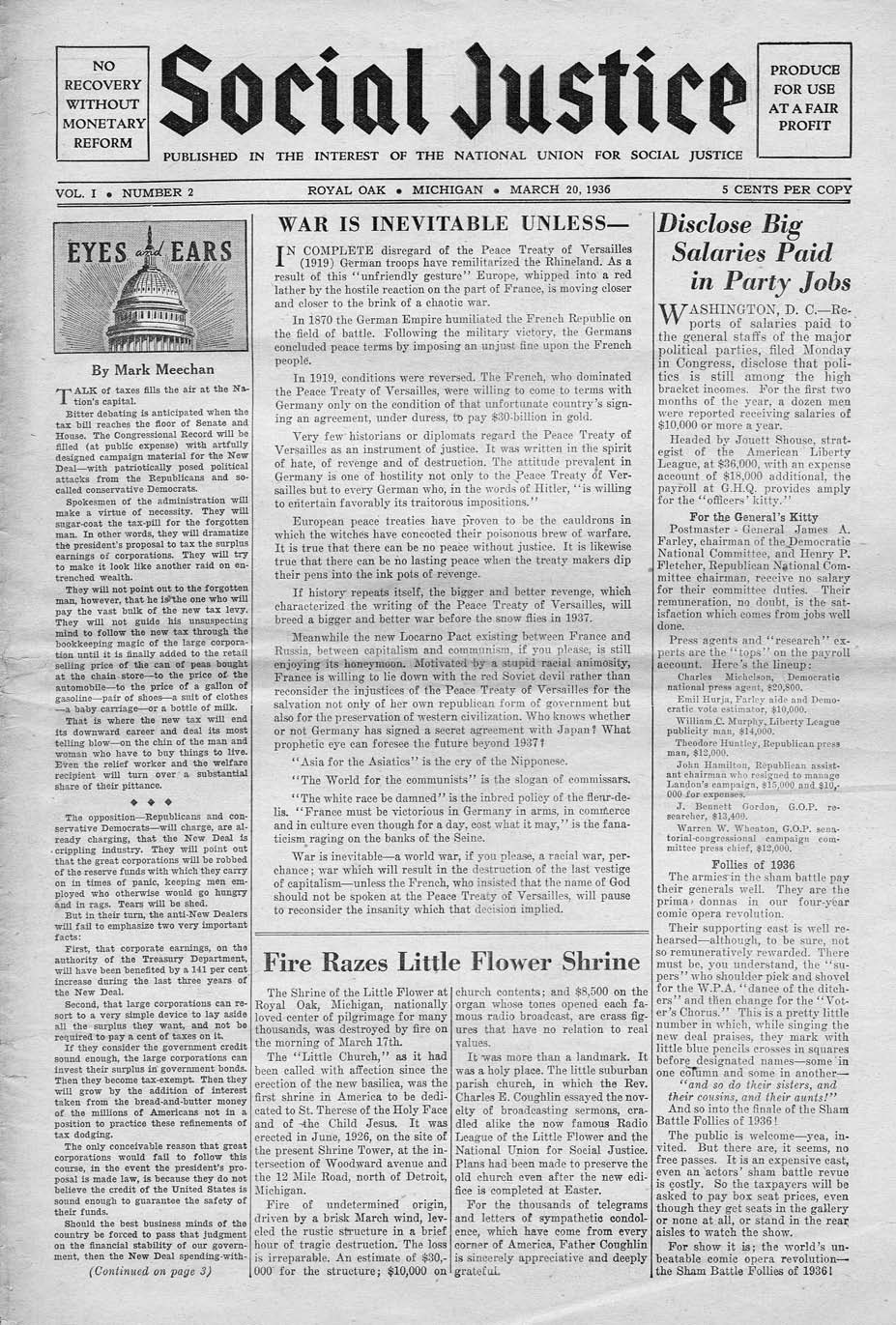
- First page of the 2nd issue, March 20, 1936
- Type: Weekly
- Owner(s): Thomas J. Coughlin; Amelia Coughlin
- Publisher: National Union for Social Justice
- Editor: Charles Coughlin; E. Perrin Schwartz
- Staff writers: Cora Quinlan
- Founded: March 13, 1936
- Ceased publication: 1942
- Language: English
- Headquarters: Royal Oak, Michigan
- Circulation: 200,000
- OCLC number: 01773391

Social Justice was an antisemitic political newspaper published by Father Charles Coughlin from 1936 to 1942.

== History ==
Social Justice was controversial for printing antisemitic polemics such as The Protocols of the Elders of Zion. Coughlin claimed that Marxist atheism in Europe was a Jewish plot against America. The December 5, 1938, issue of Social Justice included an article by Coughlin which reportedly closely resembled a speech made by Joseph Goebbels on September 13, 1935, attacking Jews and Communists, with some sections being copied verbatim by Coughlin from an English translation of the Goebbels speech. Coughlin, however, stated, "Nothing can be gained by linking ourselves with any organization which is engaged in agitating racial animosities or propagating racial hatreds." Furthermore, in an interview with Eddie Doherty, Coughlin stated: "My purpose is to help eradicate from the world its mania for persecution, to help align all good men. Catholic and Protestant, Jew and Gentile, Christian and non-Christian, in a battle to stamp out the ferocity, the barbarism and the hate of this bloody era. I want the good Jews with me, and I'm called a Jew baiter, an anti-Semite."

After America's entry into World War II, Coughlin's broadcasts were ended by the National Association of Broadcasters. In 1942, the periodical's second class mailing permit was revoked under the Espionage Act of 1917 as part of Attorney General Francis Biddle's efforts against "vermin" publications. The paper remained available on newsstands in cities such as Boston, where it was distributed by private delivery trucks.

== See also ==
- Charles Coughlin § Newspaper shutdown and end of political activities
