= Focus (novel) =

1945 novel by Arthur Miller

- Cover of the first edition
- Author: Arthur Miller
- Language: English
- Published: 1945 (Book Find Club)
- Publication place: United States

Focus is a 1945 novel by Arthur Miller which deals with issues of racism, particularly antisemitism. In 2001, a film version, starring William H. Macy, was released.

== Plot summary ==
The novel is set in New York towards the end of the Second World War. Its protagonist is a Gentile named Newman, a personnel manager for a large company, who lives with his mother. Newman shares the prejudices of his neighbor Fred, who is determined to deal with the "new element" in their neighborhood, particularly a Jewish candy store owner called Finkelstein. However, Newman is an essentially timid man who mostly wants to keep his head down and be left alone to get on with his life.

Newman's life changes when he gets a new pair of eyeglasses whose style is somehow "Jewish" to several bigoted observers, and they decide he may be Jewish himself. He hires a prospective secretary whom his boss thinks is an assimilated Jew using a WASP-sounding fake name, and is later informed that he won't get a promotion and will be moved to an interior office where people can't see him. He is furious about being mistreated (and it's strongly implied, being marked as Jewish at all) and quits; ironically, he later gets a new job at a company where the owner and many of the staff are actually Jewish.

As antisemitism mounts throughout the city, a Christian Front-type group organizes to turn general ill will into action, Newman marries a girl called Gertrude. She has seen antisemitism mobilized at close quarters before, when she lived with the ringleader of an organization that abused Jews in California (someone whose views that the U.S. will soon get rid of all Jews she notes without any editorial comment), and recognizes how risky a position Newman is in when his garbage can, as well as Finkelstein's, is turned over in the night. She has also been mistakenly identified as Jewish, and is angry at this, because she is a Christian and is disgusted that anyone would think she is Jewish, not because she thinks antisemitism is wrong and hateful.

Newman's principles and character mean that he would prefer to stand aside while the persecution of Finkelstein continues – his own latent antisemitism tacitly endorses it, while his reticence makes it hard for him to participate. But, accidentally caught up as a victim, non-participation is not an option.

An attempt by Newman to convince Fred and his collaborators of his allegiance to their cause by attending an antisemitic rally results only in his being again taken for a Jew, attacked and ejected. Approached afterwards by Finkelstein, Newman tries to politely sell Finkelstein on the idea of leaving the neighborhood and moving somewhere where he will not be threatened. Finkelstein forcefully tells Newman he will not move: the antisemitic forces want to take over the U.S. (confirming what Gertrude told him earlier) and their crusade against Jews does not make any sense in that context because Jews comprise a very small percentage of the population. Newman eventually tells Gertrude he's never really given his antisemitic thoughts any thought and now that he has, he has disavowed the bigotry and won't support it in any way, and he responds to her angry attempts to get him to change his mind by ignoring her.

Finally, Newman and Finkelstein are together attacked in the street by a gang of men, whom they fight off. Newman realizes he cannot count on Gertrude and walks away from their marriage, later going to the police to report the attack. Asked by an officer "How many of you people live there?" he stops trying to play along with bigotry and angrily repeats his account of the attack, leading the police to take down his statement and for Newman to move into a new chapter in his life.

== Reception ==
In a sympathetic review, The Illustrated London News called it "very readable. ... An effective tract for the times".
