= Focus (2001 film) =

2001 American drama film by Neal Slavin

- Directed by: Neal Slavin
- Screenplay by: Kendrew Lascelles
- Based on: Focus by Arthur Miller
- Produced by: Robert A. Miller; Michael R. Bloomberg
- Starring: William H. Macy; Laura Dern; David Paymer; Meat Loaf
- Cinematography: Juan Ruiz Anchía
- Edited by: Tariq Anwar; David B. Cohn
- Music by: Mark Adler
- Production company: Focus Productions
- Distributed by: Paramount Classics
- Release dates: September 9, 2001 (TIFF); October 19, 2001 (United States)
- Running time: 106 minutes
- Country: United States
- Language: English
- Box office: $645,418

Focus is a 2001 American drama film starring William H. Macy, Laura Dern, David Paymer and Meat Loaf based on a 1945 novel by playwright Arthur Miller. The film premiered at the Toronto International Film Festival and was given a limited release on October 19, 2001.

== Plot ==
In the waning months of World War II, Lawrence Newman is a mild-mannered, gentile man who works as a personnel manager and lives with his mother in Brooklyn. His next-door neighbor, Fred, is friendly to him but is also a member of an antisemitic group called the Union Crusaders, who blame Jews for the war. Neighborhood tensions have also intensified with the arrival of a Jewish storekeeper named Finkelstein. One day, a gentile woman named Gertrude Hart shows up at Lawrence’s workplace to apply for a job, but Lawrence brushes her off on his suspicion that she’s Jewish and his fear of being fired.

Lawrence buys a new pair of eyeglasses that people around him say makes him "look Jewish" when he wears them. As he continues to wear the eyeglasses, he himself becomes the target of antisemitic sentiment. His boss demotes him with no explanation, and Lawrence resigns in protest. He has no luck in finding a new job until he runs into Gertrude, who has found secretarial work in a Jewish-owned business. After he apologizes to her for his behavior, she helps him find work at the company. The two befriend each other and eventually marry.

As a couple, Gertrude and Lawrence become subject to multiple social humiliations, including a rejection from a resort where they had made reservations for a weekend trip. The attitude of their neighbors towards them also becomes frostier. Gertrude, who knows more than her husband about the Union Crusaders, urges him to attend a rally for his own protection. Soon, Lawrence finds himself in a situation where he must contend with his as well as his neighborhood’s prejudice.

== Cast ==
- William H. Macy as Lawrence "Larry" Newman
- Laura Dern as Gertrude "Gert" Hart
- David Paymer as Mr. Finkelstein
- Meat Loaf Aday as Fred
- Kay Hawtrey as Mrs. Newman
- Joseph Ziegler as Mr. Garage
- Kenneth Welsh as Father Crighton
- Michael Copeman as Carlson
- Arlene Meadows as Mrs. Dewitt
- Peter Oldring as Willy Doyle
- Wendy Lyon as Elsie
- Robert McCarrol as Meeting Hall Man
- Shaun Austin-Olsen as Sullivan
- Kevin Jubinville as Mr. Cole Stevens
- B.J. McQueen as Mel
- Conrad Bergschneider as Tough's Leader

== Production ==
Photographer Neal Slavin had wanted to direct an adaptation of Arthur Miller's novel Focus since he was a student at art school in the 1960s. In the 1990s, Slavin struck a deal with Miller that if a good screenplay could be written, the playwright would grant him permission to adapt the novel. Slavin commissioned playwright Kendrew Lascelles to write the script, and after some revisions and suggestions by Miller, the adaptation was approved. One of the changes which Slavin made was his decision to root the film "on the outer edges of surrealism and film noir."

For the part of Lawrence, Slavin specifically sought out William H. Macy, basing his choice on the belief that the story is a fable about how "people’s perceptions and...intolerance blinds [one] to seeing the [actual] person." Macy hesitated to play the role, saying that he "had a nagging fear that having an uber-Lutheran play a victim of antisemitism might offend someone, thinking we were trivializing the subject." Macy decided to play the role after he consulted his mentor and collaborator David Mamet.

The movie was filmed in Toronto, where its producers built a simulacrum of 1940s Brooklyn. Said Slavin, "One of my goals was to build a 'Mary Poppins'-like world, stylizing the setting so that everything looked perfect so that you felt rather than saw the dark underbelly. You're taken in by the prettiness, but you don't trust it." Editor Tariq Anwar, who had worked on the film American Beauty, was chosen by Slavin to achieve this vision.

The film was personally financed by Michael Bloomberg, a friend of Slavin's who was a candidate for mayor of New York City at the time. Slavin said, "Michael read it in one day, called me and said, 'Let's do it.' This movie happened because of him. And it wasn't like he just put the money down and walked away. He was involved in the inspiration every step of the way."

== Reception ==
=== Critical response ===
On Rotten Tomatoes, the film has an approval rating of 55% based on 80 reviews. The site's consensus reads, "Though full of good intentions, Focus somehow feels dated, and pounds away its points with a heavy hand." On Metacritic the film has a score of 53 based on reviews from 27 critics, indicating "mixed or average" reviews.

Stephen Holden of The New York Times said the film "conveys the eerie claustrophobia and choked-back panic of an especially grim and creepy episode of The Twilight Zone. Its view of 1940s America is pointedly opposite from today's prevailing gung-ho nostalgia about World War II. It pointedly reminds us that prejudice and xenophobia are the flip sides of unity and togetherness." Though Holden noted the film's themes are "as subtle as a brickbat" and were handled with more "subtlety and passion" in Arthur Miller's The Crucible, he said Focus "builds up a thunderhead of suspense." Holden concluded that the film's subject matter has become relevant again in wake of the September 11 terrorist attacks and anti-Muslim sentiment. Roger Ebert of the Chicago Sun-Times gave it three out of four stars and wrote the film is an effective parable about xenophobia because it "doesn't reach for reality; it's a deliberate attempt to look and feel like a 1940s social problems picture, right down to the texture of the color photography."

Criticisms were directed towards the film's "didacticism", the story's implausibilities and its "heavy-handed" messaging, in addition to the casting of Macy and Dern as characters who appear to be Jewish. Owen Gleiberman of Entertainment Weekly said the film was miscast and wrote, "The movie...has a topsy-turvy sense of injustice. Its central outrage isn’t anti-Semitism, really, but the far more banal fact that Macy and Dern have to endure the inconvenience of being scorned for what they’re not." In her review for The Austin Chronicle, Marjorie Baumgarten touched on these points, but concluded, "Still, [the] performances, the story's historical origins, and the inherent goodness and contemporaneity of its storyline make Focus a movie worth viewing."

=== Accolades ===
- Chicago International Film Festival
  - New Directors Competition - Neal Slavin (nominated)
- Ghent International Film Festival
  - Grand Prix - Neal Slavin (nominated)
- Golden Reel Awards
  - Best Sound Editing - Music - Feature Film, Domestic and Foreign - Joanie Diener (nominated)
- Karlovy Vary International Film Festival
  - Best Actor - William H. Macy (won)
  - Grand Prix - Neal Slavin (nominated)
- Political Film Society Award for Human Rights (won)

== See also ==
- Antisemitism in the United States
- History of antisemitism in the United States
