= Jeremy Taylor (singer) =

- Born: 24 November 1937 (age 88)
- Origin: Newbury, Berkshire, England
- Genres: Folk
- Occupations: Singer-songwriter, humorist, poet, political commentator
- Instruments: Guitar, vocals
- Years active: 1961–2008
- Website: jeremytaylormusic.com

Jeremy Taylor (born 24 November 1937 in Newbury, Berkshire) is a retired English folk singer and songwriter who has spent much of his life in South Africa, originally as a teacher of English at St. Martin's School, Rosettenville in southern Johannesburg. Since 1994, he has lived in Wales and France. After attending the University of Oxford, Taylor became a folk singer in South Africa, remembered for his single "Ag Pleez Deddy".

Much of his success came from songs that started in live performances, incorporating comedy. Taylor performed songs that questioned social problems in apartheid South Africa.

== Musical career ==
=== South Africa ===
Taylor began performing in clubs and coffee-bars such as the Cul de Sac in Hillbrow, Johannesburg in the 1960s, and succeeded with the comedic song "The Ballad of the Southern Suburbs" [of Johannesburg], also known as "Ag Pleez Deddy", in 1962. The song, written for the stage show Wait a Minim!, was a surprise hit. In performance in Chicago, he explained that while teaching South African children English, he was "enchanted" by their patois and their lust for American and European consumer products like Pepsi Cola, Canada Dry, Eskimo Pie, popcorn and chewing gum, and films like Tarzan.

Taylor mimicked their accent in the song, in which a child begs his father to take him to different places and buy these treats. It was frowned upon by parents and the government because the song mixed English and Afrikaans – a practice of which the Nationalist government disapproved, feeling all languages should be kept "pure". This was one reason Taylor was required to leave the country. This mixing of languages led to Taylor's songwriting being described as "doing for South African English what [David] Kramer was doing for Afrikaans".

However, it remained popular with children in South Africa, selling more than any Elvis Presley single in South Africa. Also in the early sixties he contributed to the successful musical revue Wait a Minim!, performing several of his own compositions. His archival material was donated to the Hidden Years Music Archive preserved by the Documentation Centre for Music, Stellenbosch University, in 2017.

=== Folk music ===
After returning to Britain in 1964 to perform in Wait a Minim! in the West End, he joined the British folk music circuit and appeared on television. Later in the 1960s, he taught at Eton College while a political exile.

Taylor had his own series of six folk-style shows entitled "Jeremy Taylor", supported by the house band Telephone Bill and the Smooth Operators, broadcast between 15 May and 19 June 1980 from the BBC Television Theatre, London. The guests included Barbara Dickson, Alan Price, Spike Milligan, Kenny Baker, Pam Ayres, Peter Skellern and Isla St Clair. After befriending folk-rock singer-songwriter Cat Stevens, and his friend and guitarist, Alun Davies, Taylor helped Stevens translate one of his songs, "O Caritas", into Latin for an album, Catch Bull at Four. One of Taylor's albums was produced by Davies. Davies guested on a couple of the songs, but was uncomfortable with playing two roles on another person's album, saying to Melody Maker, "You can't put yourself in two places at once and get the best results."

== Popular work ==
Some of Taylor's popular songs are: "Jobsworth", "Ag Pleez Deddy", "Huberta, the hippopotamus", "The Pot Song", "Mrs Harris" and "Prawns in the Game". His "Piece of Ground" was recorded in the United States by Miriam Makeba. However, his albums never reached most of the American music audience.

He was a long-term collaborator and performer with Spike Milligan, and recorded a live album with him entitled Spike Milligan and Jeremy Taylor: An Adult Entertainment. This was recorded at Cambridge University on 2 December 1973 and released as a double LP entitled Spike Milligan with Jeremy Taylor Live at Cambridge University. It was later re-issued as a two-CD set.

He continued to write songs and perform into the 21st century, in the United Kingdom, France and in the United States. In 2005 he recorded an album in Chicago, Live in Chicago.

=== Discography ===
- Ag, Pleez Daddy (Ballad of the Southern Suburbs) (1962)
- Always something new out of Africa (1966) with Andrew Tracey and Paul Tracey
- His Songs (1968)
- More of His Songs (1970)
- Piece of Ground (1972)
- Jobsworth (1973)
- Done at a Flash – Recorded Live at the Cherry Trees Motel, Alcester (1978) with Alun Davies
- Come to Blackpool (1974(?))
- The Very Best of Jeremy Taylor (1996); Reissue in (2004)
- Live in Chicago (2005)
- Spike Milligan and Jeremy Taylor: An Adult Entertainment

=== Publications ===
- Ag Pleez Deddy!: Songs and Reflections. J. Taylor Pub. 1992. ISBN 978-0-620-17142-7. (Now out of print)
