= Keep It Up Downstairs =

1976 British film by Robert Young

- Directed by: Robert Young
- Written by: Hazel Adair
- Produced by: Hazel Adair; Mark Forstater
- Starring: Diana Dors; Jack Wild; William Rushton
- Cinematography: Alan Pudney
- Edited by: Mike Campbell
- Music by: Michael Nyman
- Production company: Pyramid Films
- Distributed by: Thorn EMI
- Release date: 29 July 1976
- Running time: 94 minutes
- Country: United Kingdom
- Language: English

Keep It Up Downstairs (also known as Can You Keep It Up Downstairs? and My Favorite Butler), is a 1976 British period sex comedy film, directed by Robert Young and starring Diana Dors, Jack Wild and William Rushton. It was written by Hazel Adair.

== Plot ==
The film follows the adventures of the sex-crazed inhabitants of the bankrupt Cockshute Castle in 1904, and the attempts of Lord and Lady Cockshute to find a rich wife for their uninterested inventor son Peregrine.

== Cast ==
- Diana Dors as Daisy Dureneck
- Jack Wild as Peregrine Cockshute
- William Rushton as Snotty Shuttleworth
- Aimi MacDonald as Christabelle St. Clair
- Françoise Pascal as Mimi
- Neil Hallett as Percy Hampton
- Mark Singleton as Lord Cockshute
- Julian Orchard as Bishop
- Simon Brent as Rogers
- Sue Longhurst as Lady Cockshute
- John Blythe as Francis Dureneck
- Carmen Silvera as Lady Bottomley
- Seretta Wilson as Betsy-Ann Dureneck
- Anthony Kenyon as Mellons
- Olivia Munday as Lady Kitty Cockshute
- April Olrich as Duchess
- Sally Harrison as Maud
- Mary Millington as Polly

== Production ==
Filmed at Elstree Studios and on location at Knebworth House in Hertfordshire. A version exists with hardcore inserts; these were shot with body doubles for the main stars.

== Music ==
The score was by Michael Nyman, his first for a commercially released film.

== Critical response ==
Monthly Film Bulletin said "A joyless 'romp' that is soporifically heavy-handed with its phallic imagery and double meanings (endless references to "big ones" and "getting it off"), Keep It Up Downstairs bungles the tempting possibility of a ribald melange of Upstairs Downstairs and The Go-Between [1971] school of sensitive historical drama. The cast, required to bare breasts and buttocks at regular intervals, is able to make no headway against the inane script and consistently mistimed direction."

The Daily Telegraph called the film "a dire sex farce featuring a bed-hopping aristocratic family."
