= Randall Robinson (cinematographer) =

American cinematographer (born 1946)

Randall Robinson (born August 19, 1946, in Los Angeles, California) is an American cinematographer. He is a former president of the Society of Operating Cameramen and the founding publisher and editor of the Operating Cameraman Magazine. As a freelance cameraman he enjoyed a long successful career working for the major motion picture studios in Hollywood on feature films, television and commercials.

Robinson was the first field-test camera assistant for inventor Garrett Brown and the Cinema Products design team developing the Steadicam on the feature film Bound for Glory (1976). His input lead the team to develop many improvements, such as balance plate and follow focus. While in preparation for the picture, Robinson worked with cinematographer Haskell Wexler on the design for the first BNC hard front lens mount and prototype Blimped zoom lens housing for the Arriflex 35BL camera.

In July 1982 he was assigned as first assistant cameraman to the ill-fated helicopter filming Twilight Zone: The Movie. Survivor in the fatal crash, became a key witness in the trial of director John Landis. Randall was influential addressing safety issues on film sets, leading the Society of Operating Cameramen to issue 13 guidelines, which then presented to the Directors Guild of America were adopted and are now by-laws throughout the industry.
