= Neal Slavin =

American photographer and film director

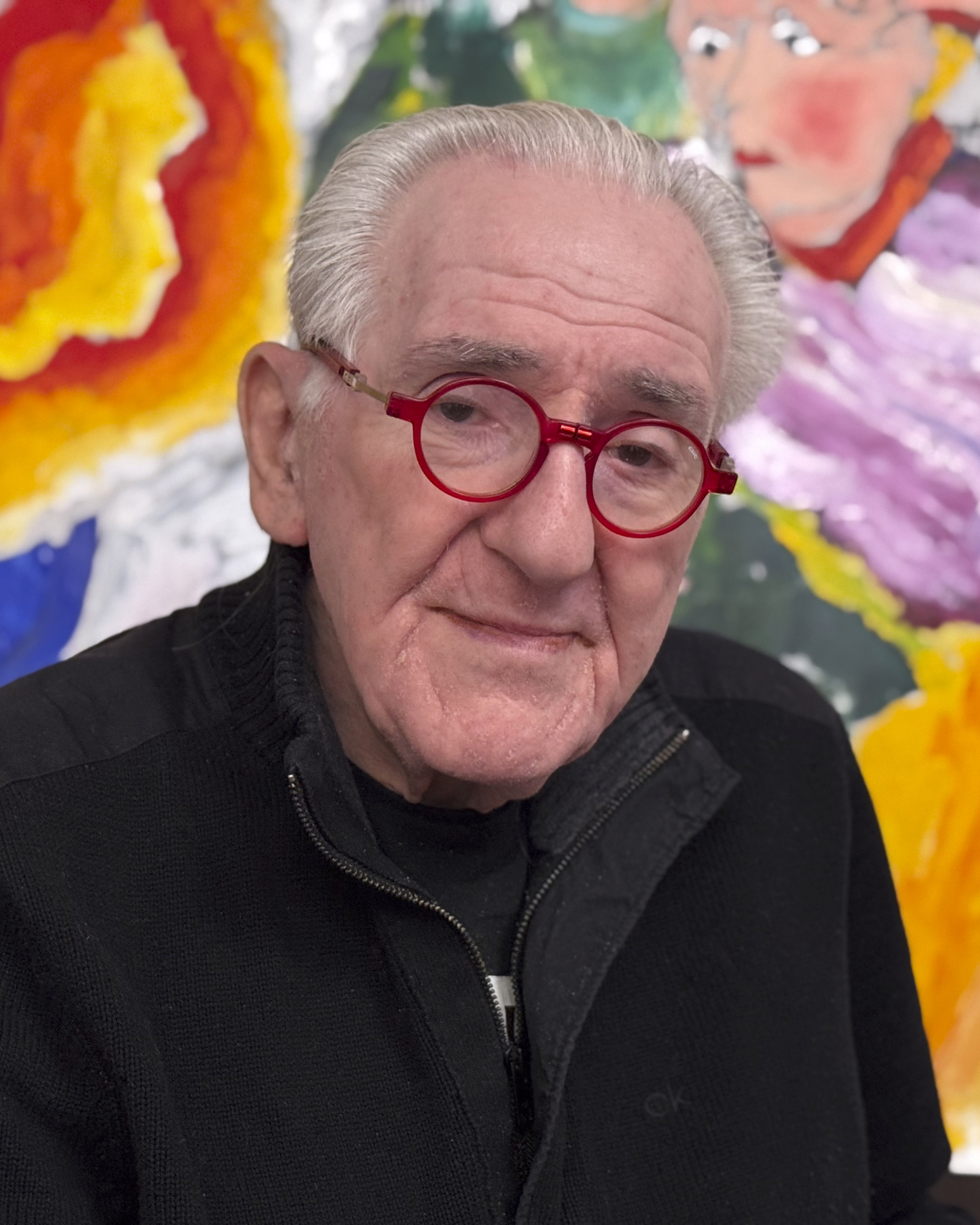
- Slavin in 2026
- Born: 1941 (age 84–85); Brooklyn, New York, U.S.
- Education: Cooper Union School of Art and Architecture
- Occupations: Photographer and film director
- Notable work: Portugal (1971); When Two or More Are Gathered Together (1976); Britons (1986); Focus (2001 film)
- Website: nealslavin.com

Neal Slavin (born 1941) is an American photographer and television/film director. He is the author of Portugal (1971), When Two or More are Gathered Together (1976) and Britons (1986). He directed and produced the film Focus (2001).

== Life and work ==
Slavin was born in Brooklyn, New York. He graduated from the Cooper Union School of Art and Architecture in New York, where he obtained a Bachelor of Fine Arts degree. He was awarded an exchange student scholarship at Lincoln College, Oxford in the UK.

Slavin's Portugal (1971) is a documentary photography book on the Portuguese people. Slavin has written: "Few people outside of Portugal knew the power being wielded on the Iberian Peninsula during the early 1930s to late 1960s. This era marks the reign of Antonio de Oliveira Salazar. I lived and photographed the Portuguese people from late 1967 to 1968, when Salazar’s health took an unexpected turn for the worse, ending his dictatorship."

Britons is a series of photographs of people from Britain, commissioned by the National Museum of Photography, Film and Television in the UK. It was published as a book in 1986 and exhibited at the International Center of Photography (ICP) in New York and at the National Museum of Photography, Film and Television that same year.

His photography has been seen in publications and magazines, including The Sunday Times magazine, Stern, Town & Country, Esquire, The New York Times magazine, Life, House & Garden, and Geo Magazine. His photographs can be found in the Museum of Contemporary Photography in Chicago, USA.

Slavin has received a number of grants and awards. He was one of the first Fulbright Fellows in Photography. He received US National Endowment for the Arts grants and a number of awards from Communication Arts Magazine. In 1986, he was named as the Corporate Photographer of the Year by the American Society of Magazine Photographers. He was also awarded the 1988 Augustus Saint-Gaudens Medal and the 2005 President's Citation by his alma mater, the Cooper Union.

He is listed in various reference works including Who's Who in American Art, The Photographers Guide, published by the New York Graphic Society, and Men of Achievement, published by the International Biographical Center in Cambridge, UK.

Since 1988, Slavin has undertaken film-making and commercials for television. In 1994, he ceased his commercial work to devote all his time to developing, directing and producing a film entitled Focus, based on Arthur Miller’s only novel, about prejudice and race in America in the early 1940s.

== Books ==
- Portugal. Lustrum, 1971.
- When Two or More are Gathered Together. Farrar, Straus and Giroux, 1976.
- Britons. London: Andre Deutsch; New York: Aperture, 1986.

== Films ==
- Focus (2001) – director and producer
