= Studio theatre (disambiguation) =

Studio theatre is a 20th-century term for a small theatre space. It may also refer to:

- Billings Studio Theater, a space and company in Billings, Montana, USA
- Florida Studio Theatre, also known as the Sarasota Woman's Club, in Florida, USA
- Gate Theatre Studio, a 20th-century studio theatre in London, UK
- National Theatre Studio, a studio theatre attached to the Royal National Theatre, UK
- Studio Theatre (Sheffield), a performance space in Sheffield, UK
- Studio Theatre, theatre at the National Institute of Dramatic Art in Sydney, Australia
- Studio Theatre (Washington, D.C.), a theatre and company in Washington D.C. USA
- Studio Theatre at the Maxwell C. King Center for the Performing Arts in Melbourne, Florida, USA

== See also ==
- The Studio (disambiguation)
