= Sam Peter Jackson =

British actor (born 1978)

Sam Peter Jackson (born 17 March 1978) is a writer/director and actor best known for writing the play "Public Property", which ran at the Trafalgar Studios in London's West End in 2009 starring Nigel Harman, Robert Daws and Steven Webb and was nominated for a 2010 WhatsOnStage Theatregoers' Choice Award as Best New Comedy. The play was published by Oberon Books.

As a filmmaker he wrote/directed the short film "The Bathroom", starring double Laurence Olivier Award winning actress Janie Dee and acclaimed actor Reece Noi, with music by Grammy Award winning composer David Arnold.

In total he has written and directed six short films, which have won awards, sold for broadcast and distribution, as well as screened at BAFTA, the BFI and festivals worldwide. Most recently Sam worked as a MoCap Performance Director on Breaking Fourth's VR film Lucid, which premiered at the 2018 Venice Film Festival.

His latest short film Clothes & Blow is screening at the 43rd Frameline Festival in San Francisco. It was nominated for the 2018 Iris Prize Best British Short and won Best Comedy at the 2019 Beeston Film Festival.

Jackson's other plays include "Minor Irritations", which was the first play to receive the Pleasance Theatre's Charlie Hartill Special Reserve and was nominated for the 2006 Oscar Wilde Award for Writing, and the short plays "Charity"and "Where I Used To Live", produced by The Factory Theatre Company in London, and "Icarus", produced by Mind The Gap Theatre in New York.

As an actor, he has most notably appeared in Channel 4's BAFTA-winning Nuremberg - Goering's Last Stand and the BBC TV film D-Day. He is also a successful voice over artist in both English and German. Most recently he provided the voice for Tobias Winter for the audiobook of The October Man, the latest Rivers of London novella by Ben Aaronovitch.

Jackson also co-wrote and presented the 2010 Channel 4 documentary "The Other Michael Jackson: Battle of the Boogie" about his father singer/songwriter Mick Jackson, who wrote the song "Blame It On The Boogie". To promote the film Sam appeared on BBC Breakfast with his father.

Jackson has been described as "a writing talent to watch" by Variety. He is represented by Berlin Associates in London.
