= Outside Edge =

Play written by Richard Harris

- Original language: English
- Written by: Richard Harris
- Subject: An afternoon's cricket turns into utter chaos.
- Genre: Comedy
- Setting: A cricket pavilion

Premiere
- Date: 1979
- Place: London, United Kingdom

Outside Edge is a play written by Richard Harris about a village cricket team trying to win a game of cricket whilst sorting out their various marital problems.

== Plot ==
Roger is having trouble getting a team together for the afternoons fixture against the British Railways Maintenance Division Reading East but this proves to be the least of anyone's worries. Bob is having marriage trouble as he is still doing odd jobs for his ex-wife behind his current wife Ginnie's back. Dennis is also having marital trouble as his wife seems intent on moving house despite the fact they only moved recently. When he finally puts his foot down she sets fire to his new car. Kevin is trying to fight off his over affectionate wife Maggie while at the same time nurse his injured spinning finger and Alex's new girlfriend ends up shutting herself in the toilets having hysterics. Even Roger's seemingly perfect marriage to Miriam hits the skids when she discovers he was playing away from home in more ways than one on a trip to Dorking last year. Just when it seems things can't get any worse for them, it starts to rain.

== Characters ==
Roger: Roger is the team captain who seems to enjoy being the leader more than actually playing cricket. Likes to think of himself as a great leader of men and organiser but in reality most of the organising is done by his wife. Outwardly he and Miriam have a perfect marriage but there is in fact very little in the way of affection between the two and when he says I Love You it's usually just to keep her happy and not because he really means it.

Miriam: Miriam has put up with Roger's cold and almost uncaring attitude for many years and hides all her frustration behind her beaming smile and sunny personality. Miriam is the real organiser of the team but she lets Roger take all the credit for it as she knows it makes him happy. She becomes increasingly frustrated as the play goes on and finds it more and more difficult to keep it in.

Kevin: The closest thing Roger has to a real friend on the team and the demon spin bowler. Married to Maggie whom he adores despite their explosive relationship. He often behaves like a petulant child sulking when things don't go his way and blowing hot and cold with Maggie over her mothering of him.

Maggie: Kevin's wife who adores him but often behaves more like his mother than his wife. Like a mother she is very good at dealing with Kevin when he gets in a sulk. Maggie is not a stereotypical woman and is more at home doing DIY than domestic chores.

Bob: Bob is married to Ginnie but still spends a lot of time with his ex wife doing odd jobs mainly out of guilt. Bob has a constantly guilty expression and never seems to be able to say no to anyone. Despite his faults Bob is a down to earth sort who has no time for pretentious phonies like Dennis and arrogant show offs like Alex.

Ginnie: Bob's long suffering second wife. She arrives unannounced at the match when Bob has left to visit his ex-wife leaving Miriam to try to cover for him. Ginnie's relationship with Roger and Miriam is strained to say the least as Roger was very fond of Bob's ex-wife and Ginnie views Miriam as an interfering busy body who spends too much time worrying about other people's marriages and not paying enough attention to her own declining one. It is Ginnie who first hints to Miriam about Roger's little indiscretion in Dorking.

Dennis: Dennis is a carpet salesman who likes to give the impression he is a well-connected self-made man. Dennis also fancies himself as a ladies man but just comes across as a letch. In an effort to get people to like him he gets equipment for the team which he gives them at a reduced price claiming he gets it wholesale when in fact he has paid full price.

Alex: Alex is a lawyer who, perhaps for this reason alone, is much disliked by Bob – although in truth, if only out of jealousy, there are plenty of reasons to dislike this character; if his abundant snobbery and good looks aren't enough, he is also by far the best batsman on the team. Perhaps unsurprisingly then, Alex is also the only unmarried male in the play – but makes up for this with nothing less than a pole dancer girlfriend who, in one comic moment in the play, feels the need to lock herself in the toilets due to her treatment by Alex.

Sharon: Sharon is Alex's latest girlfriend who like most of the women he tends to attract isn't overly furnished in the brain department. She feels very out of place at the cricket club and the fact that Alex ignores her doesn't make things any better. She ends up locking herself in the toilets and having hysterics.

== Original cast ==
The play opened at the Hampstead Theatre in London on 24 July 1979 and transferred to the Queen's Theatre on 11 September 1979. The cast was as follows:

- Roger – Richard Kane
- Miriam – Julia McKenzie
- Kevin – Ian Trigger
- Maggie – Maureen Lipman
- Bob – John Kane
- Ginnie – Susan Carpenter
- Dennis – Julian Curry
- Alex – Martin Wimbush
- Sharon – Natalie Forbes

== Adaptations ==
- In 1982 the play was adapted for a one off television showing starring Paul Eddington as Roger, Prunella Scales as Miriam, Jonathan Lynn as Kevin and Maureen Lipman as Maggie. The cast also featured Gary Waldhorn as Dennis and Leslie Ash as Sharon.
- In the mid-1990s Harris adapted the play into a sitcom on ITV starring Robert Daws as Roger, Brenda Blethyn as Miriam, Timothy Spall as Kevin and Josie Lawrence as Maggie.

== See also ==
- Village cricket
- Outside Edge (TV series)
