= Desmond O'Connor (cabaret performer) =

English cabaret host and musical comedy performer

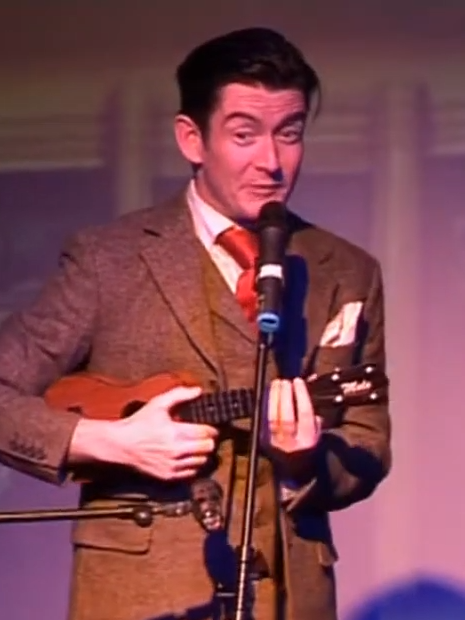
- O'Connor in 2012
- Born: 1972 (age 53–54); Northampton, England, UK
- Other name: Des O'Connor
- Occupations: Cabaret performer, composer, lyricist, independent psychologist
- Spouse: Zoie Kennedy
- Website: https://desmondoconnor.weebly.com/ http://www.twiceshytheatre.com

Desmond O'Connor (also known as Des O'Connor) is an English ukulele-playing cabaret host and musical comedy performer. He is a composer and lyricist and musical director/co-creator for the Twice Shy Theatre.

== Career ==
Des O'Connor was a member of the Cambridge Footlights at the same time as Mitchell and Webb, John Oliver, Richard Ayoade and Matthew Holness. After a year away from Cambridge, he became musical director of the Footlights at the invitation of David Mitchell. At one point, O'Connor was a Latin teacher. In 2010, he was a presenter for MTV UK at Bestival and The Big Chill. In 2009, he was a composer, lyricist and musical director of Scott Mills The Musical for BBC Radio 1, working alongside co-writer Emlyn Dodd and director Patrick Wilde. Wilde directed the musical Failed States, written by O'Connor and Andrew Taylor, which won Best Book and Best Lyrics in the MTM UK musical theatre awards in Edinburgh in 2006. Failed States was revived this year for a run at St James' Theatre, London and at Latitude Festival, 2015, to mark the 10-year anniversary of the London bombings. He and Taylor also wrote the musical Toxic Bankers, which enjoyed an extended run at the Leicester Square Theatre in 2011.

== Shows ==
O'Connor produced and starred in And the Devil May Drag You Under and Desmorphia which showed at the Brighton Festival Fringe in 2009 and 2010 respectively. And the Devil May Drag You Under has also played in Berlin and at Latitude Festival. O'Connor has made regular club and festival performances in London, Dublin, Amsterdam, Berlin and New York, and at the New York Burlesque Festival 2008. He has a growing fan base.

In 2008, he was co-producer of the Ministry of Burlesque's High Tease during the Edinburgh Festival Fringe and at Glasgow's Old Fruitmarket in December. In September of that year, he produced Fallen Angels with Julie-Ann Laidlaw, a show that has been subsequently produced in Berlin. With Laidlaw, O'Connor created and produced Vive le Cabaret at the Pleasance during the Edinburgh Festival Fringe 2010, which won Best Cabaret in the "Edinburgh Spotlight" awards.
