= The Honey Siege =

1987 British children's TV series

- Genre: Children's; Adventure
- Based on: The Honey Siege by Gil Buhet
- Written by: Dave Martin
- Directed by: John Jacobs
- Starring: Nigel Harman; Lyndon Davies; Barbara Ewing; Belinda Sinclair; Kenny Ireland; Kevin Lloyd; Stephan Chase; Brian Miller; Martin Eales; Jim Dunk; Lee Ormsby; Natalie Morse; Stephen Bateman; John Stilwell; Dominic Arnold
- Composer: Paul Lewis
- Country of origin: United Kingdom
- Original language: English
- No. of series: 1
- No. of episodes: 7

Production
- Executive producer: Patrick Dromgoole
- Producer: Derek Clark
- Production locations: Crewkerne, Somerset, England, UK; Brouckerque, France
- Running time: 29 minutes
- Production company: HTV West

Original release
- Network: ITV
- Release: 7 June – 19 July 1987

The Honey Siege is a British children's adventure television series based on a 1958 novel of the same name by Gil Buhet and adapted for television by Dave Martin and directed by John Jacobs. It was made by HTV West for the ITV network and aired for one series and seven episodes between 7 June and 19 July 1987.

== Cast ==
- Nigel Harman as George Green
- Lyndon Davies as Pete Rainbow
- Barbara Ewing as Feen Rainbow
- Belinda Sinclair as Phoebe Belham
- Kenny Ireland as William Mutch
- Kevin Lloyd as Phil Gattrell
- Stephan Chase as Godfrey Green
- Brian Miller as Ben Rainbow
- Martin Eales as Henry Mardilow
- Jim Dunk as Albert Mardilow
- Lee Ormsby as Victor Mutch
- Natalie Morse as Jenny
- Stephen Bateman as Febbo
- John Stilwell as Frank Gattrell
- Dominic Arnold as Charles Durrant

== Episode list ==
All seven episodes were written by Dave Martin and directed by John Jacobs and were broadcast on ITV on Sundays at 16:30.

No.	Title	Directed by	Original release date
1	"The Blood Oath"	John Jacobs	7 June 1987
The boys at Crowker school are threatened with the suspension of their Coronation Day holiday unless someone confesses to the wrecking of the beehives.
2	"The Traitor"	John Jacobs	14 June 1987
The boys at Crowker school have their Coronation Day holiday cancelled, and decide to run away.
3	"The Disappearance"	John Jacobs	21 June 1987
The boys of Crowker have run away, resulting in a search by their parents.
4	"Defiance"	John Jacobs	28 June 1987
The boys of Crowker have barricaded themselves inside Crowker Castle. Their father's plan a way to break the siege
5	"Ghosts"	John Jacobs	5 July 1987
The boys discover a secret passage after they have prevented their fathers from entering Crowker Castle.
6	"The Battering Ram"	John Jacobs	12 July 1987
One day to go to the Coronation and the red flag is flying over Crowker Castle. To the mayor's fury a young reporter has got hold of the story.
7	"Victory!"	John Jacobs	19 July 1987
It is Coronation Day 1953. The boys appear to have won the battle. But why is the flag flying at half must?

The series survives complete on 1" videotape as part of the HTV collection which is now held by ITV plc.

== Production ==
The series set in 1953, and they were both filmed in Crewkerne, Somerset, England, UK and Brouckerque, France.
