= The Magician's House =

Children's book series by William Corlett

The Magician's House is a quartet of children's fantasy books by William Corlett. Two mini-series were produced in 1999 for British television, which were directed by Paul Lynch. The series featured Jennifer Saunders and Stephen Fry voicing some of the animal characters.

The books were published in the early 1990s, and named as follows:

1. The Steps up the Chimney
2. The Door in the Tree
3. The Tunnel behind the Waterfall
4. The Bridge in the Clouds

Although in a rural setting, this series' focus on subjects such as industrial development and the combining of present-day and past settings in the plotline gives it a feeling tending more towards urban fantasy than simply contemporary fantasy.

In addition, though there is no specific mention of Welsh myths and legends, the strong part nature plays in the stories and the settings bring to mind other British children's authors. Authors like Elizabeth Goudge, noted for The Little White Horse, and Alan Garner, who is perhaps best known for The Owl Service and Elidor, and Susan Cooper, famous for The Dark Is Rising sequence of books, who allude more specifically to British myth and legend in their writings.

== General plot ==
The four books centre on young siblings William, Mary and Alice Constant. They spend their holidays at Golden House, a large 16th-century house in the British countryside. The house is not give a specific location except close to Wales. The books follow the children as they discover the secrets of Golden House and the Magician who once lived there.

The events of the four books take place roughly over ten months; with the events of each book occurring during a traditional British school holiday period. Effectively, each book reflects a season: The Steps up The Chimney takes place during the winter and over the Christmas holiday; The Door in the Tree takes place in spring, during the Easter holiday; The Tunnel behind the Waterfall takes place during the long summer holiday; and The Bridge in the Clouds takes place during the shorter autumn half-term. During these holidays, the children's parents are carrying out humanitarian work in the Third World, so the children stay with their uncle Jack and his partner Phoebe.

The storylines of the respective books incorporate various ecological and animal rights issues, such as badger baiting, fox hunting and industrial development. In addition, the children fight against the Magician's evil assistant, Matthew Morden, whose quest for power leads him to disturb the magical and ecological balance within Golden Valley.

== Book 1: The Steps up the Chimney (1990) ==
The first book introduces the majority of the key elements of the series, such as the characters personalities, travelling within various animals and Golden House itself. Before the first chapter in each of the four books a map drawing is shown illustrating where the important aspects of that particular book take place. In this book the picture is of Golden House, and the surrounding Walled Garden with a dovecote in the centre.

Book 1 begins with William, Mary and Alice arriving at Golden House for the first time during the Christmas Holidays. It's explained that Jack and Phoebe bought the house and plan to eventually turn it into a hotel, there is much work to be done and the majority of the house is not habitable. All three children dislike Jack's pregnant partner, Phoebe. She is presented as having a liberal attitude with a strong influence over Jack, where the children have a much more traditional and conservative outlook. The children find out Jack and Phoebe are vegetarian, and despite the children not being so, they are expected to respect their lifestyle while at the house. The children are also shocked that Phoebe is pregnant and the baby is expected shortly, consequently will be born out of wedlock.

Whilst the children's developing relationship with Jack and Phoebe is explored so is the history of Golden House along with its current layout. While learning about and exploring Golden House they discover hidden steps at the back of the main fireplace, the steps lead to a secret room where they meet the Magician, Stephen Tyler. It's explained that Stephen Tyler is from 400 years previous, and he has the ability to travel to other times. An Elizabethan alchemist his work is focused around the art of Alchemy, however it is quickly established that he is not pursuing riches by making gold from the art. The Magician explains he needs the children's help and he will explain more about his work within the valley and what he hopes to achieve when the time is right.

The remainder of the book focuses on the unexpected early arrival of Jack and Phoebe's baby during a snow storm. Golden House is isolated from the nearby town and consequently the baby has to be born in the house. While Jack and William set out in the storm to try to get help, Mary and Alice stay with Phoebe and try to protect her and the baby from an evil rat which is attempting to prevent the birth from taking place. While William is trying to get help he discovers he can speak to and travel with animals within the valley and he does this for the first time with a fox called Cinnabar. Alice also experiences this with a local stray dog called Spot (towards the end of the book Mary also travels with an animal, Jasper the Owl). Together they prevent the rat from interfering and a baby called Stephanie is born in Golden House by the fireplace.

The Magician explains that the rat was being influenced by another Magician in his own time named Morden. It's explained that Stephanie and therefore Phoebe are distant descendants of Stephen Tyler and Morden does not want the Tyler family line to exist within Golden House. The holiday is over and the children leave the house, but are able to arrange for Spot to become the family dog before they leave.

== Book 2: The Door in the Tree (1991) ==
The map drawing in book 2 is essentially the same as what is in book 1 except everything has panned further out, so more of Golden Valley can be seen. Running through the centre of the map, through Golden house itself is a wide wood trail with a large tree in the centre. At the top a standing stone is shown and beyond that the beginnings of a lake. On the left hand side of the map is another wood trail which is narrower and leads to a quarry. On the right a parallel trail leading to a small house with four fields on either side.

The children go back to Golden House to spend their Easter Holidays in Jack and Phoebe's care. Reflecting the drawing at the front of the book, they discover that the left path has become a dark and dangerous place where animals in the valley go to die. The right path leads to a small farm owned by Meg Lewis, an old lady whose family used to own Golden House. She lives alone and spends her time at the farm and looking after the nearby local badger set. The children discover a secret hideout at the top of an old yew tree, which is on a straight line that connects to the secret room at the top of Golden House.

The threat in this book comes from modern day badger baiter's, they travel over England and take badgers from sets and force them to fight their dogs for sport. The Magician wants the children to stop trying to help the badgers and focus on the task he has for them, they ignore his request and he leaves them. It is eventually discovered that the baiter's have set up a fighting ring at the end of the dark and dangerous path within the quarry. The children, with the help of their animal friends, Meg, Jack and the local police manage to stop what is happening.

It is revealed the Magician wanted the children to help the badgers all along, his work involves maintaining the natural order of Golden Valley in all time periods, seeing as the badgers are part of this order he is pleased they helped them.

== Book 3: The Tunnel behind the Waterfall (1991) ==
The map in Book 3 map is the same drawing as book 2's, but again it has been panned further out so a wider view can be shown. The only new elements this time is the rest of Golden Lake and the Golden Valley mountains beyond.

It is the school Summer holidays and William, Mary and Alice are back at Golden House with this book focusing on the surroundings of Golden Lake. Morden is influencing his future descendants, the Crawdens, into buying the land surrounding Golden Lake and turning it into an amusement park on par with Disneyland. All the main characters including Stephen Tyler are dismayed by this news, as it would destroy Golden Valley and the natural order as they know it. Eventually the plans for the development are thwarted.

== Book 4: The Bridge in the Clouds (1992) ==
The map drawing in the final book once again pans further out, encompassing the entire valley and a large area of land nearby. Annotations on the map show who owns this land or what the land is called.

When the children leave Golden Valley at the end of the Summer holidays, Morden increases his negative influence as his powers grow stronger. When the children return to the house in their Autumn school holidays they arrive to a depressingly evil place. The Magician accepts he is an old man and is not able to protect the valley forever, he explains he has been teaching the children all that he knows so that they might pass on this information and guide the newest Tyler at Golden House, Stephanie.

A large battle between good and evil ensues, as the animals of the valley pick sides. There are multiple deaths, and Stephan Tyler is fatally injured. He eventually dies in his own time much to the upset of the children and the valley's animals. It's revealed towards the end of the book that Stephen Tyler's wishes likely come true, as a glimpse of the future is shown with Stephanie as a teenager still living at Golden House and exploring its secrets. It's also hinted that Stephanie and one of the Crawden descendants eventually become a couple and have children. Potentially with the two warring families coming together by blood and starting a new era at Golden House. However the book ends within the children's time concluding that they have much work to do before Stephen Tyler's wishes are eventually fulfilled.

== About the books ==
The central characters in "The Magician's House" series — William, Mary, and Alice Constant — were inspired by and named after three real-life children who were friends and neighbours of the author, William Corlett. Corlett drew inspiration from his interactions and observations of these children, infusing elements of their personalities, experiences, and dynamics into the fictional Constant siblings. This personal connection to real children not only lent authenticity to the characters but also reflected Corlett's keen understanding of young minds and relationships. The inclusion of these characters in the series highlights Corlett's approach to writing, where he often blended elements of reality with the fantastical, creating a relatable yet magical world for his readers.

William Corlett lived in the Wye valley in the Welsh Borders when he wrote "The Magician's House" series. The characters of William, Mary, and Alice were inspired by family friends and neighbors from the time Corlett lived in Great Bardfield. The books in the series are dedicated as follows: "The Steps up the Chimney" is dedicated to the Dyson family; "The Door in the Tree" is dedicated to Alice Dyson, who is also the focus of this story; "The Tunnel behind the Waterfall" is dedicated to William Dyson, with William as the central character; and "The Bridge in the Clouds" is dedicated to Mary Dyson, centering around her character. These dedications and character focuses reveal the deep personal connections and inspirations behind Corlett's writing, further illustrating his ability to weave real-life experiences into his captivating narratives.

== Television adaptation ==
The Magician's House
- Genre: Fantasy/Children's television
- Created by: William Corlett (books)
- Directed by: Paul Lynch
- Starring: Ian Richardson; Neil Pearson; Siân Phillips; Katie Stuart; Christopher Redman; Olivia Coles; Steven Webb
- Voices of: Jennifer Saunders; Stephen Fry; Gary Martin
- Composer: Ken Williams
- Country of origin: United Kingdom
- Original language: English
- No. of series: 2
- No. of episodes: 12

Production
- Producers: Helena Cynamon; Stephen Garrett
- Running time: 30 mins

Original release
- Network: BBC 1
- Release: 31 October 1999 – 17 December 2000

The television adaptation altered the relationship between the children slightly, with Mary becoming Jack's daughter and William and Alice's cousin. Her character is also considerably more argumentative and headstrong than in the books, as well as having apparently relocated from Canada to Jack's home country, as had Phoebe, who, like Mary, has a Canadian accent.

== Audio books ==
In 2019, Alice Dyson, who served as the inspiration for one of the central characters in William Corlett's "The Magician's House" series, undertook the production and direction of an unabridged audiobook version of the first book in the series, "The Steps up the Chimney." This project was a notable endeavor, as it brought together elements from both the original literary work and its television adaptation. The audiobook was read by Dame Siân Phillips, acclaimed for her portrayal of Meg Lewis in the TV adaptation of Corlett's books. Phillips' involvement in the audiobook added a layer of continuity and authenticity, bridging the gap between the written narrative and its screen interpretation. Dyson's decision to produce and direct this audiobook can be seen as a tribute to the enduring impact of Corlett's work and her personal connection to the series. The audiobook was made available on platforms such as Amazon, allowing a new generation of listeners to experience the magic and adventure of "The Magician's House."
