= The Royal =

British television drama series (2003–2011)

- The Royal intro.
- Genre: Medical drama
- Starring: Julian Ovenden; Zoie Kennedy; Robert Daws; Amy Robbins; Linda Armstrong; Wendy Craig; Ian Carmichael
- Opening theme: "Somebody Help Me" by The Spencer Davis Group, sung by Michael Starke
- Ending theme: "Somebody Help Me" (instrumental) by The Spencer Davis Group
- Country of origin: United Kingdom
- Original language: English
- No. of series: 8
- No. of episodes: 87 (List of episodes)

Production
- Running time: 60 minutes
- Production company: ITV Studios

Original release
- Network: ITV
- Release: 19 January 2003 – 31 July 2011

Related
- Heartbeat; The Royal Today

The Royal is a British period medical drama, produced by Yorkshire Television (later part of ITV Studios), and broadcast on ITV from 2003 until its cancellation in 2011. The series is set in the 1960s and focuses on the lives of the staff at the fictional "St Aidan's Royal Free Hospital", a National Health Service hospital serving the fictional rural seaside town of Elsinby and its surrounding area. The programme was a spin-off of ITV's period drama series Heartbeat and the first three series featured crossovers with Heartbeat and appearances by its cast members. From the start of the fourth series, the crossover elements were removed, and The Royal focussed on stories involving its own cast.

The series initially began with its cast including Ian Carmichael, Wendy Craig, Robert Daws and Amy Robbins, and gradually expanded. Much of the outdoor scenes were primarily shot within North Yorkshire, including within Whitby and Scarborough, with interior shots filmed at both The Leeds Studios and St Luke's Hospital, Bradford. The programme remained popular on television until its cancellation, generating its own spin-off, The Royal Today, with episodes later repeated on ITV3.

== Premise ==
The Royal takes place in the 1960s within the fictional seaside town of Elsinby in the North Riding of Yorkshire, and focuses on the lives of the staff who work in St Aidan's Royal Free Hospital – a cottage hospital established by the ancestor of its hospital secretary, T. J. Middleditch, to serve its local community. Placed under the care of the National Health Service, the staff do their best to offer their patients care and treatment, including maintaining casualty facilities and operating theatres, while coping with their own lives. Like Heartbeat, episodes mainly focused on either one big story or two major storylines, medical problems, and an occasional side story, with overarching plotlines concerning the relationships and personal lives of the main characters. For the first three series, episodes featured crossovers with Heartbeat through some of the Heartbeat cast making appearances in plots on The Royal, the most prominent of these being Bill Maynard, William Simons and Mark Jordon, but this element of the programme was dropped after the third series of The Royal.

The majority of the plots centred on medical emergencies or serious medical cases, and often featured moral dilemmas. The Royal largely avoided political topics, though the Vietnam War was briefly the subject of one episode, and its main themes were the conflict between progressive and conservative social ideals, and the ethical challenges and social changes faced by the hospital's staff, reflecting the period setting. Like Heartbeat, the show had a number of anachronisms, such as the use of the expression "the glass ceiling", and the appearance in one episode of an RAF Sea King SAR helicopter, which did not enter service until 1978.

=== Filming ===
Filming of the interior scenes of "St. Aidan's" used both The Leeds Studios and St Luke's Hospital, Bradford. Most of the exterior scenes were shot during the summer months at the Red Court building on Holbeck Road, South Cliff, Scarborough, as well as the nearby park area and Holbeck Clock Tower. The remaining exterior scenes were filmed elsewhere in the North Riding of Yorkshire, including Whitby.

== Cast and characters ==
=== Main cast and characters ===
- Julian Ovenden as Dr David Cheriton (series 1–3), a general practitioner (GP) and the series' original protagonist.
- Zoie Kennedy as Meryl Taylor (series 1–5), a senior staff nurse and Cheriton's primary love interest.
- Robert Daws as Dr Gordon Ormerod (series 1–8), a GP and anaesthetist who in series 4 married Dr Jill Weatherill (played by Daws' real-life wife). Their only biological child together, Jonathan, a baby on the show, became a lead doctor at the hospital as an adult, as featured in The Royal Today
- Amy Robbins as Dr Jill Weatherill (series 1–8), a GP and a staunch promoter of maternal medicine, who in series 4 married Dr Gordon Ormerod (played by Robbins' real-life husband).
- Linda Armstrong as Sister Brigid (series 1–8), a nursing administrator, ward sister and nun (née Aisling Donahue) who lives in a convent.
- Francis Matthews as Dr James "Jim" Alway (series 1), Dr Cheriton's predecessor, seen in only two episodes of The Royal, after briefly having replaced the late Dr Tricia Summerbee (Clare Calbraith) as GP in Aidensfield in four episodes of Heartbeat.
- Ian Carmichael as T. J. Middleditch (series 1–5, recurring thereafter), Hospital Secretary and Chairman of the Middleditch Trust, which helps to fund the hospital.
- Wendy Craig as Matron (series 1–8), nursing administrator, nicknamed "Toffee" ever since airmen at the Royal Air Force Station she served at as a nurse during the Second World War decided that she was "toffee-nosed" (snobbish/stuck up).
- John Axon as Nigel Harper (series 1–4), unpopular administrator for the district health authority.
- Michelle Hardwick as Lizzie Hopkirk (series 1–8), the receptionist at St Aidan's, daughter of the hospital porter Ken Hopkirk, and cousin of auxiliary nurse Roz Hopkirk; she was married to Dave Kennoway, who was only seen in one episode (in Series 2), but her husband left her off-screen for another woman during Series 4.
- Denis Lill as Mr Rose (series 1–8), a consultant general surgeon often assigned to St Aidan's.
- Andy Wear as Alun Morris (series 1–8), a porter and theatre technician.
- Michael Starke as Ken Hopkirk (series 1–7), St Aidan's head porter, father of Lizzie Hopkirk and uncle of Roz Hopkirk.
- Stefanie Wilmore as Roz Hopkirk (series 1), an auxiliary nurse, niece of Ken Hopkirk and cousin of Lizzie Hopkirk.
- Polly Maberly as Dr Lucy Klein (series 2–3), a consultant psychologist and a foil for Cheriton.
- Anna Madeley as Samantha Beaumont (series 3–4), a student nurse.
- Paul Fox as Dr Jeff Goodwin (series 3–6), Cheriton's replacement and later, Makori's primary love interest.
- Scott Taylor as Frankie Robinson (series 4–7), an ambulance driver.
- Natalie Anderson as Stella Davenport (series 4–7), a senior staff nurse and Frankie's longtime love interest.
- Amelia Curtis as Catherine Deane (series 5–6), a senior staff nurse.
- Kananu Kirimi as Dr Joan Makori (series 5–6), a GP and a member of Doctors Without Borders.
- Robert Cavanah as Adam Carnegie (series 5–7), hospital secretary.
- Sam Callis as Dr Mike Banner (series 6), a GP, anaesthetist, and sought-after locum physician.
- Kari Corbett as Marian McKaig (series 6–7), a staff nurse.
- Sarah Beck Mather as Susie Dixon (series 6–8), a student nurse.
- Damian O'Hare as Dr Nick Burnett (series 7), a GP recruited by Jill following the departures of Goodwin and Makori.
- Chris Coghill as Bobby Sheridan (series 7), an ambulance driver.
- Gareth Hale as Jack Bell (series 7–8), head porter of St Aidan's, who takes over from Ken Hopkirk.
- Neil McDermott as Dr Ralph Ellis (series 8), a locum GP noted for his forward-thinking approach to medicine.
- Glynis Barber as Jean McAteer (series 8), hospital secretary.
- Lauren Drummond as Faye Clark (series 8), a student nurse.
- Diana May as Carol Selby (series 8), a staff nurse.

== Ratings ==
Below is the list of ratings of The Royal, giving an overall result for each series.

Series	Year	Rank	Average audience share
1	2003	10th	10.12 m
2	2003	11th	7.16 m
3	2003–2004	13th	9.17 m
4	2004–2005	12th	8.49 m
5	2006	10th	7.93 m
6	2007	11th	7.24 m
7	2008–2009	15th	4.91 m
8	2009–2011	15th	4.62 m (incl. ITV1+1)
Overall rating		12th	7.45 m

== The Royal Today ==
In 2007, ITV commissioned a daytime spin-off of The Royal, entitled The Royal Today. The spin-off focused on the same settings of the main show, but set in the present day with a new cast of characters. The show ran for one series in 2008 between 7 January to 14 March. The show was axed due to low ratings.

== End of production ==
Speculation surrounding the future of both Heartbeat and The Royal began in 2009, when ITV announced on 4 March that a loss of £2.7 billion was forcing it to make cutbacks in employment numbers, the biggest of which were made at ITV Yorkshire Studios. Many raised concerns that the shows were to be axed, after reports were made to that effect in early January, though a spokesperson stated later that the production of the shows was simply "resting". No official news was given that the show was axed, but like Heartbeat, the series ended with a cliffhanger surrounding one of its main characters, when the final episode was aired on 31 July 2011.

== DVD releases ==
To date, only the first two series of The Royal have been released on DVD, in both Region 2 and Region 4. Series One was released on 3 October 2011 in Region 2, and on 5 December 2012 in Region 4. Series Two was released on 27 February 2012 in Region 2, and on 6 March 2013 in Region 4. Series 3–8 of The Royal remain unreleased, as of 2024.
