= Public Property (play) =

2009 play by Sam Peter Jackson

Public Property is a play by the English playwright Sam Peter Jackson. It is about a news anchor called Geoffrey Hammond, who gets caught in a public sex scandal.

Public Property ran at the Trafalgar Studios in London's West End in 2009 starring Nigel Harman, Robert Daws and Steven Webb and was nominated for a 2010 WhatsOnStage Theatregoers' Choice Award as Best New Comedy.

The play was published by Oberon Books.

The production was presented by Tara Wilkinson on behalf of Whippet Productions and directed by Hanna Berrigan. It also featured on-screen cameos by Stephen Fry, Elize du Toit and Natasha Little.
