= Zoie Kennedy =

English actress (born 20.january 1977)

Zoie Kennedy (born 1977) is an English television and stage actress. She starred as Meryl Taylor in ITV's The Royal from 2003–2006. She has appeared on stage around Britain, including at the Alhambra Theatre in Bradford and the Theatre Royal, Windsor.

== Early life and education ==
Kennedy was born about 1977 in Hereford, England, the daughter of Kathy Davies. She attended Woebly Primary School, and Haberdasher's Monmouth School for Girls. In 1992, she won a scholarship based on her GCSE results, in which she received 10 As. In 1994, she won a summer place at the National Youth Theatre. Kennedy then studied drama at Leeds University.

== Career ==
Kennedy's first TV appearance was as a WPC in This Is Personal: The Hunt for the Yorkshire Ripper. She then appeared on Emmerdale, in the role of news reporter Polly Grantham.

In 2003, she got the role of Staff Nurse Meryl Taylor in ITV's The Royal. In 2003, she was nominated for best newcomer at the National Television Awards. Kennedy starred in the series from 2003–2006.

In 2004, Kennedy played the role of Adrienne in Noel Coward's The Marquise at the Alhambra Theatre in Bradford and at the Theatre Royal, Windsor. In 2005, she played Rita in Educating Rita at the Hereford Courtyard. In 2007, Kennedy played the part of Cecily in The Importance of Being Earnest at The Haymarket, Basingstoke.

She is also the artistic director of the Twice Shy Theatre.

== Critical reception ==
Of her 2004 performance as Adrienne in The Marquise at the Alhambra Theatre in Bradford, the Telegraph & Argus said "Zoie Kennedy gave a touching performance as Adrienne, the sweet-natured daughter torn between her father's wishes and her passion for an unsuitable man".

Of her 2005 performance in the title role in Educating Rita, the Hereford Times said "Zoie Kennedy's Rita is less complex – she comes at it fresh faced and quirky. Her outfits mark the seasons changes in Rita's growth. [...] Russell's [...] Rita has really lived and I didn't get that sense of desperation here, but maybe it will come."

Of her 2007 performance as Cecily in The Importance of Being Earnest at The Haymarket, Basingstoke, the Basingstoke Gazette said "Her wide-eyed, vivacious delivery was just wonderful, particularly when combined with Jim Alexander's droll and rather oleaginous Algie, who was also a particular hit with the audience."

== Personal life ==
Kennedy met first husband, Stuart Gibson, when they both starred on the show The Royal. Kennedy lives in London with her second husband, the composer, Desmond O'Connor, and their two children.
