= Ken Williams (composer) =

Canadian musician and composer

Ken Williams (born 1952 in Victoria, British Columbia) is a Canadian musician and composer, and the current mayor of Highlands, British Columbia, having served in that office since December 2014.

In his career as a musician, Williams played with The New Vaudeville Band, the Dixon House Band and Zipper, and was a studio bassist at Mushroom Studios in Vancouver. He was nominated for a Video Premiere Award for Best Composer for The Crimson Code. His other composing credits include In the Company of Men, So Weird, The Magician's House, Police Academy and Two of Hearts.
