= Steven Webb =

English actor

- Born: 8 November 1984 (age 42); Wirral, Merseyside, England
- Occupation: Actor
- Years active: 1993–present

Steven Michael Webb (born 8 November 1984 in Wirral, Merseyside, England) is an English actor in theatre, television and film.

== Early life and education ==
Webb started acting when he was 8 years old and at 10 took over the lead role of Oliver in the London Palladium production of the musical. He studied at the Sylvia Young Theatre School.

At age 14, in 1996, he appeared as a child dancer alongside Michael Jackson during the singer's Brit Awards performance of "Earth Song", getting knocked off stage and cracking a rib when Jarvis Cocker came on.

== Career ==
Webb's most notable theatre work includes appearing as Posner in the second casting of Alan Bennett's The History Boys and as Elder McKinley and Moroni in the West End run of The Book of Mormon.

In January 2025 the cast for the UK premiere of Shucked was announced, with Webb playing the role of Storyteller 2, alongside Monique Ashe-Palmer as Storyteller 1, Ben Joyce as Beau, Sophie McShera as Maizy, Georgina Onuorah as Lulu, Keith Ramsay as. Peanut and Matthew Seadon-Young as Gordy.

Television work includes the BBC series The Magician's House, which featured actors such as Katie Stuart, Ian Richardson, Stephen Fry and Jennifer Saunders. He has also appeared in the ITV drama series Bad Girls (2001, 2006), in which he played David Saunders, son of inmate Julie Saunders. More recently, he has appeared in episodes of Miranda and The Inbetweeners.

He is the host of the podcast Brain Rot, which discusses classic horror movies.

== Filmography ==
=== Theatre ===
Year	Title	Role	Theatre	Category
1993	Twopence to Cross the Mersey	Helen Forrester's Son	Liverpool Empire Theatre	Regional
1994	Scrooge	Tiny Tim	Liverpool Empire Theatre	Regional
1994	Her Benny	Little Willy	Liverpool Empire Theatre	Regional
1995	Oliver!	Oliver Twist	London Palladium	West End
1999	Hogarth	Young Hogarth	Bridewell Theatre	Off West End
2002	Dark of the Moon	Bill Summney	The King's Head Theatre	Off West End
2003	A Midsummer Night's Dream	Francis Flute/Mustard Seed	Crucible Theatre	Regional
2003	The Trestle at Pope Lick Creek	Dalton Change	Southwark Playhouse	Off West End
2004	Kes	MacDowall		
2005	On the Shore of the Wide World	Christopher Holmes	NT/ Royal Exchange Manchester	
2005–2007	The History Boys	Posner	NT/ UK tour & West End	
2006	The Maids	Solange	Etcetera Theatre	Off West End
2007	Christmas in New York (showcase)	Performer	Lyric Theatre, London	West End
2007–2008	Chatroom/Citizenship	Jim/Stephen	NT/ UK tour & Hong Kong	
2008	Sons of York	Mark	Finborough Theatre	Off West End
2008	Sh*t-M*x	Bent Ben	Trafalgar Studios	West End
2008	The Long Road	Joe	Soho Theatre	Off West End
2009	Public Property	Jamie	Trafalgar Studios	West End
2010	Departure Lounge	Ross	Waterloo East Theatre	Off West End
2010–2011	Dick Whittington and His Cat	Dick Whittington	Lyric Hammersmith	Off West End
2011	Lakeboat	Dale	Arcola Theatre	Off West End
2011	Betwixt! the Musical	Cooper	Trafalgar Studios	West End
2011–2012	Aladdin	Wishy Washy	Lyric Theatre (Hammersmith)	Off West End
2012	Cinderella	Buttons	Lyric Theatre (Hammersmith)	Off West End
2016–2023	The Book of Mormon	Moroni/Elder McKinley	Prince of Wales Theatre	West End
2024–2025	Here You Come Again The Musical	Kevin	NT/ UK tour	UK tour
2025	Shucked	Storyteller No. 2	Regents Park Open Air Theatre	Off West End
2025–2026	Pinocchio	Giacomo Cricket/The Coachman	Shakespeare's Globe	Off West End
2026	Feeling Afraid As If Something Terrible Is Going To Happen	The Comedian	Studio Theatre	US

=== Television ===
Year	Title	Role	Format
1995	Sometime Never	Thomas	TV series
1997	Goodnight Sweetheart	School Boy	1 episode
1997	Paul Merton in Galton and Simpson's...		Series 2, episode 3
1997	The Adventures of Paddington Bear	Jonathan Brown (voice)	TV series
1998	Julia Jekyll and Harriet Hyde	Edward Knickers	Series 3
1999	Heart of Gold	Ben	
1999	The Magician's House	William Constant	Mini-series
1999	Wives & Daughters	William Goodenough	Mini-series
2000	The Magician's House II	William Constant	Mini-series
2000	Take a Girl Like You	Craig	TV film
2001	Holby City	Jamie Newman	Series 3, episode 12
2001	Peak Practice	Kurt	Series 11, episode 13
2001, 2006	Bad Girls	David Saunders	Series 3 & 8
2002	15 Storeys High	Dean	Series 1, epidode 4
2003	Loving You (a.k.a. The Rainbow Room)	Justin	TV film
2003	The Bill	Justin	Series 19, episode 43
2004	The Inspector Lynley Mysteries	Daniel Brooks	Series 3, episode 3
2005	Mr. Harvey Lights a Candle	Dave Miller	TV film
2006	After Sun	Stuart	TV film
2009	Doctors	Harry Wylie	Series 11, episodes 109, 161 & 162
2010	The Inbetweeners	Alastair	Series 3, episode 1
2013	Miranda	Travel Agent	Series 3, episode 6
2014	Beautality	Jean-Luke	TV film
2026	Twenty Twenty Six	Ryan Hertz	Series 1, episode 6

=== Audio ===
Title	Role	Channel/Broadcaster	Original Air Date
The Accountant of Solyanka Square	Victor	BBC Radio 4	May 2008
Peter Pan in Scarlet	Slightly	BBC Radio 4	Oct 2006
Another Country	Devenish	BBC Radio 4	2006
The Luke Reports III	Daniel/Timon		2003
Just Prose			
Stalingrad Kiss	young Valentin	BBC Radio	2003
Ah, Wilderness!	Richard		2003
The Voyage of the Dawn Treader	Eustace Scrubb		2001–2002
The Silver Chair	Eustace Scrubb		2001–2002
The Last Battle	Eustace Scrubb		2001–2002
To Sir With Love			
The Arab-Israeli Cookbook			
Phaeton			
The Subtle Knife	Will Parry	BBC	1999
Tales From The Bog End Road		BBC Radio 4	1996
Saturday Night and Sunday Morning		BBC Radio 4	1995
Winnie The Pooh	Christopher Robin		

=== Film ===
Title	Role	Release date
House of Boys	Angelo	2010
Nobody's Perfect	Jason	2004
To Kill a King	Boy at Naseby	2003
Princess and the Pea	Prince Rollo	2002
Thou Shalt Not Kill (Mord in Blitzlicht)	Daniel/Micheal ?	2000
Anything's Possible	Phillip	1999
Rewind	Eric	1998
A Christmas Cracker	Ben	1998
Veron's Christmas	Billy	1997
Norma's First Date	Myles	1997

== Awards and recognition ==
- 2011 – Broadway World West End Awards for Best Featured Actor in a Musical: Nominated, Betwixt! (cast member)
- 2003 – Evening Standard Theatre Awards for Most Outstanding Newcomer: Nominated, The Trestle at Pope Lick Creek (cast member)
- 2000 – BAFTA Children's Awards for Best Drama: Nominated, Magician's House (cast member)
- 2000 – Children and Young People International Emmy Award: Magician's House (cast member)

== Personal life ==
Webb has stated that he is "technically pansexual".

He has been in relationships with Tom Scutt, Dino Fetscher, Marios Nicolaides and more. He was previously in a relationship with Stephen Fry.

Webb has one sister, and a dog called Henry. He has stated he is an avid fan of the video game Minecraft.

He has been sober since 2 April 2020.
