= Hilary Crane =

British actress (1933–2009)

- Born: 2 February 1933; Liverpool, England
- Died: 2009 (aged 75–76); United Kingdom
- Years active: 1958–2008
- Height: 5 ft 6.5 in (169 cm)

Hilary Crane (2 February 1933 – 4 June 2009) was an English actress, best known for her role as Nora Jenkins, the mother of Peter 'Tucker' Jenkins in the BBC series Grange Hill and its sister show, Tucker's Luck.

== Credits ==
=== Television ===
Year	Title	Role	Notes
1958	Little Women	Party Guest	
1961	Harpers West One	Lucy	
1962	Z-Cars	Joan Nelson	
1963	No Hiding Place	Susan Hammond	
1963	The Desperate People	Freda Stansdale	
1963	ITV Television Playhouse	Helena	
1964	Love Story	Elizabeth	
1969	Z-Cars	Mrs. Storey	2 episodes
1970	Z-Cars	BD Girl	2 episodes
1970	Z-Cars	Beryl Richards	2 episodes
1971	Justice	WPC Johnson	
1973	Whodunnit?	Mrs. Hurst	
1973	Z-Cars	Mrs. Bowman	
1974	South Riding	Sybil Beddows	4 episodes
1975	Dixon of Dock Green	Susan	
1976	A Place to Hide	Laura Valenta	5 episodes
1976	Rocky O'Rourke	Mrs. Flanagan	4 episodes
1976	The Onedin Line	Ada Moffatt	
1977	Target	Judy Farlow	
1978	Z-Cars	Mrs. Robertson	
1978	The Sweeney	Jean Redgrave	
1978–1979	Accident	Ruth Dutton	2 episodes
1978–1981	Grange Hill	Mrs. Nora Jenkins	7 episodes
1980	The Professionals	Miss Kendall	
1980	Shoestring	Shop Assistant	
1981	Bergerac	Mrs. Kranski	
1982	Never the Twain	Customer	
1983	Brookside	Irene Harrison	
1983–1985	Tucker's Luck	Mrs. Nora Jenkins	17 episodes
1984	Hammer House of Mystery and Suspense	Carla	
1984	Tripper's Day	Lady	
1985	Bleak House	Mrs. Snagsby	
1987	Slinger's Day	Woman Customer	
1988	Help!	Vivien	
1988	Boon	Gay Pettifer	
1989	The Labours of Erica	Miss Cookson	
1989	Never the Twain	Woman in Garden	
1991	No Job for a Lady	Mrs. Miller	
1991	Screen Two	Gina	
1991	Hope it Rains	Mrs. Pike	
1991	French Fields	Coach Passenger	
1992–1993	Eldorado	Rosemary Webb	33 episodes
1995–1996	Outside Edge	Shirley Broadley	9 episodes
1998	Midsomer Murders	Mrs. Maddox	
1999	The Bill	Mrs. Harrison	
2003	Doctors	Joan Coren	
2003	Midsomer Murders	Mrs. Partridge	
2004	Casualty	Amy Parfit	
2005	All About George	Middle-Aged Woman	
2008	Doctors	Elaine Chambers	

=== Film ===
Year	Title	Role
1973	A Warm December	Marsha Barlow
1973	The Optimists of Nine Elms	Schoolteacher
1980	The Dick Emery Hour	
1989	The Return of Sam McCloud	Mary Clifford
1996	London Suite	Woman in Restaurant
