= Outside Edge (TV series) =

British sitcom

- Genre: Sitcom
- Created by: Richard Harris
- Directed by: Nick Hurran
- Starring: Brenda Blethyn; Robert Daws; Josie Lawrence; Timothy Spall
- Country of origin: United Kingdom
- Original language: English
- No. of seasons: 3
- No. of episodes: 22

Production
- Producer: Paula Burdon
- Running time: 30 minutes (including commercials)
- Production company: ITV Central

Original release
- Network: ITV
- Release: 24 March 1994 – 13 February 1996

Outside Edge is a British sitcom by Richard Harris that starred Brenda Blethyn, Robert Daws, Josie Lawrence and Timothy Spall. Three series and a Christmas special were produced by Central Independent Television and were broadcast on ITV from 24 March 1994 to 13 February 1996. The series was adapted from Harris' original stage play which premiered in 1979; upon adapting it for television, Harris expanded on the characters' back stories and introduced more plot lines that were absent in the original play. The series focuses on the lives of two couples with contrasting attitudes, the uptight and conservative Roger (Daws) and Miriam Dervish (Blethyn) with the bohemian and adventurous Kevin (Spall) and Maggie Costello (Lawrence) and their involvement with the local Brent Park Cricket Club who meet every Saturday. Other members of the club are also focussed on, from the lecherous womaniser Dennis Broadley (Denis Lill), timid and naive Nigel (Nigel Pegram), snobbish solicitor Alex Harrington (Ben Daniels/ Chris Lang) and browbeaten husband and later father Bob Willis (Jeremy Nicholas/ Michael Jayston), along with a number of other characters who also regularly appear through the series' run. The series was one of the more successful ITV sitcoms during the 1990s, and it won a number of awards at the time, including Best Comedy Drama and Best Actress in 1994 for Brenda Blethyn at the British Comedy Awards in 1994, as well as a Writer's Guild of Great Britain award for best situation comedy in 1994 for its writer/ creator Richard Harris. Moreover, both Robert Daws and Josie Lawrence were nominated for Best Actor and Best Actress at the British Comedy Awards in 1995. The series was not the first time that the play had been adapted for television; it had been previously adapted as a one-off television play that was shown in 1982, which starred Paul Eddington (Roger), Prunella Scales (Mim), Jonathan Lynn (Kevin) and Maureen Lipman (Maggie) in the principal roles respectively.

== Cast ==
=== Main ===
- Brenda Blethyn as Miriam Dervish
- Robert Daws as Roger Dervish
- Josie Lawrence as Maggie Costello
- Timothy Spall as Kevin Costello

=== Co-stars ===
- Denis Lill as Dennis Broadley
- Nigel Pegram as Nigel
- Jeremy Nicholas (Series 1) and Michael Jayston (Series 2–3) as Bob Willis
- Ben Daniels (Series 1) and Chris Lang (Series 2–3) as Alex Harrington

=== Recurring cast ===
- Tracy Brabin as Ginnie Willis
- Katy Landis as Sharon (Series 1–2)
- Hillary Crane as Shirley Broadley (Series 2–3)
- May Boak as Nigel's Mother (Series 2–3)
- Roy Holder as Fred (Series 2)
- Rosemary Martin as Sonia (Series 2)
- Amanda Waring as Sophie (Christmas Special, Series 3)
- David Belcher as Vicar (Series 3)
- Duncan Knowles as Clive (Series 3)

== Plot ==
Roger Dervish (Daws) is the astute and bossy captain of the local cricket team who thinks, talks and dreams about the game all the time. He enlists his timid wife, Mim (Blethyn), who organises the club's teas at every match. She is also constantly ordered around by her husband for everything ranging from catering and equipment to transport to every home and away game. Their regimented lifestyle is turned upside down when on one match day they are introduced to the vivacious and outgoing Maggie Costello (Lawrence), wife of Kevin (Spall), a bowler from Roger's cricket team. A friendship soon develops between Mim and Maggie, who encourages Mim to come out of her shell and become more assertive towards Roger. The ensuing revelation of home truths and long-hidden secrets tears through their staid lifestyle like wildfire. For Mim and Roger things will never be quite the same.

== Characters ==
Miriam Dervish played by Brenda Blethyn

Miriam, otherwise known as Mim, is the long-suffering wife of Roger and assistant to his constant needs both at the cricket ground and at home. She used to be involved in the local operatic society but had to give up her promising career to raise a family and look after her pushy husband. She is timid, kind and quite forgiving towards people and tries her best to avoid confrontation with others, which can sometimes be to her disadvantage and lead to further problems. At the beginning of the series she lives a relatively sedate and humdrum lifestyle, which mainly consists of looking after her husband and organising the cricket club's teas every Saturday. However her efforts are rarely appreciated and she is often harangued by Roger. Her life is turned around when she meets Maggie, who encourages her to become more confident and express her feelings more, along with being more assertive towards Roger and less submissive towards his behaviour.

Roger Dervish played by Robert Daws

Bossy, opinionated and always to the task, Roger is the Captain of his local Cricket team, a role he takes very seriously. Outside of work, most of his life revolves around organising and planning the weekly fixtures, sometimes his excessiveness and attention to detail can be an annoyance towards others, and when things go wrong with the Cricket team or at home he is rarely able to handle it well. His constant obsessiveness about Cricket leads to Roger neglecting his wife, to the point where it almost leads to a breakdown in their marriage. Roger merely sees Mim as subservient to his whims and needs whether it's at home or at the Cricket club, and he rarely reciprocates her efforts. He is often frosty and brusque towards others, which often leads to confrontation; and his old fashioned stiff upper lip attitude masks his inability to express his feelings. Despite his failings, he is fairly efficient at organising the local Cricket club, although his compulsiveness can be seen as a sign that he takes his role as Captain too seriously.

Maggie Costello played by Josie Lawrence

In contrast to Mim, she is outgoing, flirtatious, brash and frequently expresses her feelings about people. She is married to Kevin, a bowler of the local Cricket team; she is deeply infatuated with her husband and their passionate relationship frequently leads to public displays of affection, which often causes disquiet among the other members of the club. She lives a carefree Bohemian lifestyle and dresses in revealing tops and outfits as a means of expressing her sensuality, however her extroverted behaviour masks her sadness and inability to come to terms with the concept that she and Kevin may not be able to have children. She is resourceful, generous and a jack of all trades whether it's mending a fence, fixing a car or cleaning out the gutters, although she is utterly hopeless in the kitchen. Over the course of the series, she strikes up a friendship with Mim when she starts attending her husband's Cricket matches. She encourages Mim to break out her shell and become more assertive towards her husband and reach out to her inner confidence.

Kevin Costello played by Timothy Spall

Unlike his wife, he can be seen as shy and is often submissive to her dominating behaviour, he will do anything for his wife whether it's trying on dresses for size or laying down patio slabs in the garden. Despite their constant squabbles, he is completely in love with his wife, and their fervent relationship is often fiery and expressive. He is the polar opposite to Roger, he is laidback, reticent and disorganised, he frequently likes to lie down and avoid asserting himself in difficult situations, often to the consternation of others, particularly Roger. He has a kind hearted and genial nature, although he often relishes in winding up other members of the club with outlandish lies which lead to all sorts of trouble. Besides his talent for Cricket, he is a genius in the kitchen and regularly rustles up gourmet meals for himself and Maggie. And although he has a frequently tempestuous relationship with his wife, he is always willing to defend Maggie when criticised by others, as well as support and stand by her through thick and thin.

== Episodes ==
=== Series 1 (1994) ===
No. overall	No. in series	Title	Original release date
1	1	"The Captain"	24 March 1994
On the way to a cricket match, Roger's Volvo won't start and they are soon introduced to Kevin's wife Maggie for the first time, who impresses them with her mechanical skills. Soon they are on the road again, but Roger and Miriam quickly get lost on the way to the Cricket grounds. By sheer coincidence they encounter Kevin and Maggie again, who gladly offer their assistance for a second time. First appearance of Denis Lill as Dennis Broadley.
2	2	"Getting to Know You"	31 March 1994
Continuing on from the first episode, whilst the match goes on, Miriam and Maggie get the chance to know more about each other. Whilst Bob accuses one of his team mates of cheating, when they to try to run him out on purpose. And Kevin laments to Roger about his eventful love life and the strain of being married to a sex addict. First appearance of Ben Daniels as Alex Harrington, Jeremy Nicholas as Bob Willis and Nigel Pegram as Nigel.
3	3	"The Committee Meeting"	7 April 1994
At short notice, Roger calls for an urgent committee meeting at his house, to discuss the upcoming away match at Cromer. The meeting struggles to go-ahead as constant distractions delay the proceedings. And Kevin announces that he is not on speaking terms with Maggie. Later on Maggie takes a look at the guttering and Dennis takes advantage of this by picking the best vantage point, which leads to disastrous consequences for him.
4	4	"Sex"	14 April 1994
A bowler takes it badly when Roger drops him from the team. Roger visits Kevin for some tips in improving his and Miriam's love life. Kevin is overjoyed to be help, but his advice soon leads to getting Roger arrested, when he tries to make an obscene phone call to Mim from a public call box. At the police station, the investigating officer only happens to be the disgruntled bowler, Roger dropped from the team.
5	5	"The Team Tea"	21 April 1994
Miriam is accidentally locked out of her house, and injures her neck after sliding down a ladder whilst trying to gain entry. At the surgery, she bumps into Maggie who is having tests on her fertility problems. At a cafe, Maggie confides in Mim about her inability to have children and time is running out on her biological clock. At the cricket match, Nigel has trouble trying to convince the others that he was supposed to playing. First appearance of Katy Landis as Sharon.
6	6	"The Night Before Cromer"	28 April 1994
On the night before the big game against Fatty Woolacott's team, tensions soon mount when Roger's team arrive at the Hotel de Paris in Cromer. Bob tries to avoid his wife Ginnie, who is furious when she discovers that she wasn't supposed to come. Roger insists that the team follow a no alcohol policy, however his instructions are soon ignored and the players quickly head for the bar for a wild night of drinking, chaos soon abounds when a drunken Roger accidentally sets off the fire alarm. First appearance of Tracy Brabin as Ginnie Willis.
7	7	"The Match in Cromer"	5 May 1994
The day of the big game arrives and tensions run high as the teams battle it out. Ginnie is left perplexed when people start laughing her at behind her back, while Miriam starts to worry about what happened at the away match in Dorking, and she soon makes enquiries with members of the team. Her agitation eventually reaches boiling point and after the game finishes, an infuriated Mim confronts Roger in the car park and demands to know the truth of what actually happened in Dorking. Last appearance of Ben Daniels as Alex Harrington and Jeremy Nicholas as Bob Willis.

=== Series 2 (1995) ===
No. overall	No. in series	Title	Original release date
8	1	"The Blister"	5 January 1995
Roger struggles to make amends with Miriam, after she discovered that he had an adulterous fling during the team's trip to Dorking. A spate of injuries among the players threaten to derail Roger's plans for the game, and he desperately tries to find substitute players. Kevin blames Maggie for giving him a blister on his bowling hand and tries to find ingenious ways to relieve his pain. First appearance of Michael Jayston as Bob Willis, Chris Lang as Alex Harrington and Roy Holder as Fred.
9	2	"Discretion"	12 January 1995
As the match continues, Miriam demands that Roger has a talk with the players about the events in Dorking. Maggie is adamant that she's happy with her life, despite her inability to have children. Whilst the opposition team's captain refuses an injured Nigel's request to use a runner. Meanwhile Kevin's blister continues to worsen. First appearance of Hilary Crane as Shirley Broadley.
10	3	"Illness"	19 January 1995
Miriam has come down with flu, and Roger tries to hide his consternation as he tries to cope without her. At the Cricket grounds, Alex volunteers his girlfriend Sonia to take over the catering duties. Being inexperienced in the kitchen, she struggles with the workload until Kevin offers his assistance when he checks up on her progress. Last appearance of Katy Landis as Sharon.
11	4	"The Death of Fred"	26 January 1995
The team is shocked to the core, when Fred suffers a fatal heart attack on the pitch. The team evaluate their lives whilst reeling from the shock. Whilst Roger insists that he breaks the news to Fred's wife Sonia, and is surprised when he finds out that she was already aware of Fred's heart condition before he joined the team. On the night before the Funeral, a drunken Kevin persuades Roger and Miriam to dress in colourful clothing during the service. Much to their embarrassment, at the Church, they find that Kevin has failed to pass the message on to the rest of the team. Last appearance of Roy Holder as Fred; first appearance of Rosemary Martin as Sonia.
12	5	"The Barbecue"	2 February 1995
The mood is mixed at the annual Brent Park Barbecue, Dance and Fundraising Evening. Everyone tries to make the best of it, despite the thoughts of Fred's recent passing still very much on in their minds. Maggie is furious when Alex gives Kevin the brush off and moves to confront him. Roger tries to attract the attention of a potential new player for the team and Bob is nervous about Ginnie's reaction about being pregnant. First appearance of May Boak as Nigel's Mother; last appearance of Rosemary Martin as Sonia.
13	6	"Rain Stopped Play"	9 February 1995
Roger refuses to concede for a draw when heavy rain showers put an end to a match. Trying to find ways of preventing the players from leaving, he quickly organises a cricket quiz in the Pavilion. Very soon, questions are raised about Roger's competency as Captain and an incensed Miriam quickly plots a counter attack to retain Roger's position.
14	7	"The Club Meeting"	16 February 1995
It's the day of the club's EGM when the team cast their votes on the Captaincy of the team. Roger and Alex desperately try to win support from the players ahead of the meeting. During the course of the meeting, tensions and opinions flare as the players cast their votes. Maggie informs Kevin that she wants to renew their wedding vows, whilst Shirley is distraught when Dennis admits to her that she has been wasting time viewing new houses since it was never his intention to move. Shirley decides to take out her anger on her husband's new car, with fiery repercussions.

=== Christmas Special (1995) ===
No. overall	No. in series	Title	Original release date
15	1	"Corfu - OK? Fair Enough"	25 December 1995
The club hold a Greek themed fancy dress party after returning home from a triumphant away game in Corfu. Later that evening, Roger insists that everyone should watch the Corfu tour video together. During the screening, Alex makes an announcement about his newfound relationship with Sophie and a heavily pregnant Ginnie is suspicious that Bob was having an affair during the Corfu trip. First appearance of Amanda Waring as Sophie.

=== Series 3 (1996) ===
No. overall	No. in series	Title	Original release date
16	1	"The New Pitch"	2 January 1996
It's the day of the official opening of Brent Park CC's new Cricket pitch and Pavilion. The proceedings continuously threaten to derail, due to the unfinished construction of the Pavilion, a runaway herd of cattle from the nearby farm and a faulty portable toilet that locks in the guest of honour, Godfrey Evans, who appears as himself in the episode. First appearance of David Belcher as Vicar.
17	2	"The New Player"	9 January 1996
Maggie and Kevin present Roger and Miriam with a new lawnmower, which Maggie has extensively restored over the Winter. Later on, the team are practising on the pitch, when Roger introduces to them a young new player, Clive. The members can't resist taking pot shots about his relative lack of experience and youth. While in the Pavilion, the Vicar expresses his interest to Mim about joining the team. Shortly after, Mim finally gets a chance to ride on the lawnmower, with chaotic consequences when the clutch gets jammed and she struggles to keep it under control as it hurtles its way around the pitch. First appearance of Duncan Knowles as Clive.
18	3	"The First Match"	16 January 1996
After discovering that Bob has been thrown out by Ginnie. Roger and Miriam offer him the chance to stay with them for a while, and attempt to cheer him up. The first match on the new cricket pitch is nearly scuppered when the local farmer leaves a huge pile of manure on the pitch and they're shocked to hear news that Alex has been rushed to A&E after being attacked by Sophie's dog. Roger quickly enlists the Vicar to join his team. After tea, Clive shows signs that he's developed a crush on Mim when he helps her with the dishes. Later that day, Maggie's meddling sister Rosie (Annette Badland) causes a rift to flare between Maggie and Kevin when she reveals a devastating revelation about Kevin.
19	4	"The Happy Event"	23 January 1996
Kevin is reeling from the fact that he is impotent and is furious with Maggie about hiding the truth from him for so long. Bob is invited back to live with Ginnie, and thanks the Dervishes for their hospitality when he leaves them. And later on when Miriam and Roger visit Kevin and Maggie's house to discuss plans for their second weeding, they find that the couple have fallen out with each other and attempt to resolve the situation.
20	5	"Lost"	30 January 1996
On the way to an away game, Roger's poor navigational skills soon leads the entire team getting lost in the middle of the countryside. Later they are stuck in a traffic jam on a country lane which leads to arguments between the players and their wives. Roger tries to work out a way to get out of the mess by leading the players on a walk through the fields towards the location of the cricket grounds. Meanwhile Clive rescues Miriam when her car gets stuck in water and discretely admits he has feelings for her.
21	6	"Match Cancelled"	6 February 1996
Miriam tries to persuade Roger to cancel an upcoming match with Piggy Pearson's team, due to an incident with his divorced sister a few years back. When the match takes place regardless, Piggy invites his sister down as a means of distracting Roger during the game. Back at Pavilion, Mim tries to dissuade Clive's advances when he reveals that he has had a crush on her since joining the team, and is deeply infatuated.
22	7	"The Blessing"	13 February 1996
Maggie and Kevin attend a rehearsal for their second wedding ceremony and are less eager than Roger and Miriam. When the day of the ceremony arrives, the whole team are in attendance at the church, but where are the bride and groom? The assembled throng try to make the best of things as they wait for the couple to arrive, only for a number of revelations to come out of the woodwork.

== Development ==
In 1991, Richard Harris wrote a pilot for a potential TV series adaption for 'Outside Edge' and submitted it to Central Independent Television, sometime later the script eventually found its way to the attention of his former colleague and producer Paula Burdon. As Harris recalled for an interview with Suzan Leavy from The Stage Magazine in 1994 "I was quite surprised that Paula commissioned me to write six episodes before Vernon Lawrence (TV producer) had even seen it." He continued by stating "it was quite strange because I sent the script in about three years ago, so you wait around all that time and suddenly it's all systems go and you are told to go away and write six more episodes'. Harris later admitted in another interview that the first series was largely based on the original stage play, with the subsequent two series adding to the original idea and following up on the plot lines and characters established in the first series.

== Location filming ==
Much of the series was filmed on location around Nottinghamshire using a single camera setup which was unusual for sitcoms at the time, it was also one of the earliest TV sitcoms to use be shot and processed on filmized videotape, which has become the norm for most sitcoms since the early 2000's. The setting for the Cricket club changed each series, during Series 1 the scenes at the Cricket club were filmed at Thrumpton Cricket Club in Thrumpton, Nottinghamshire during the Summer of 1993; for Series 2 this was switched to Wollaton Cricket Club in Wollaton, Nottinghamshire and for the 3rd and final series it was filmed at Colston Bassett, Nottinghamshire; unlike the first two series which were filmed at existing Cricket clubs, a club hut and pitch were purposefully built by the production crew as a means of avoiding disruption to filming by resident Cricket teams which had been an issue before in previous series. The constant changes of location for the Cricket club was finally acknowledged in the Series 2 finale 'The Club Meeting' when Roger announces that the club will moving to a new home ground. Other filming locations included West Bridgford, Nottinghamshire for the scenes at Mim and Roger's house, the Hotel de Paris in Cromer, Norfolk for the episode 'The Night Before Cromer', and Aslockton railway station in Asklockton, Nottinghamshire for the scene in the Series 3 opener 'The New Pitch' where Kevin and Maggie meet real life Cricketer, Godfrey Evans on the station platform, who plays himself in the episode. Moreover, filming was done overseas in Corfu, for the 1995 Christmas Special, 'OK - Corfu? Fair Enough'.

== Home media ==
The first series was originally released on VHS on the 6 June 1994 by the Video Collection and Central Video, the two subsequent series and the 1995 Christmas Special were also released in the ensuing years on VHS by Carlton Home Entertainment. The entire series was eventually released as a DVD boxset on the 6 October 2008 by Network, also included within the boxset was the 1982 one off television play.
