= List of The Royal episodes =

This is a list of episodes of the British television medical drama series The Royal. When the episodes are aired or repeated abroad some musical tracks have been replaced from the original UK broadcast episode/s. This is due to either copyright issues or clearance issues from the various record companies. In total, 87 episodes of The Royal have aired.

== Series overview ==
| Series | Episodes | Originally released | |
| Series | Episodes | First released | Last released |
|---|---|---|---|
| 1 | 7 | 19 January 2003 | 2 March 2003 |
| 2 | 6 | 25 May 2003 | 29 June 2003 |
| 3 | 14 | 16 November 2003 | 15 February 2004 |
| 4 | 12 | 5 December 2004 | 6 March 2005 |
| 5 | 12 | 12 March 2006 | 22 October 2006 |
| 6 | 12 | 25 March 2007 | 4 November 2007 |
| 7 | 12 | 22 June 2008 | 5 July 2009 |
| 8 | 12 | 12 July 2009 | 31 July 2011 |

== Episodes ==
=== Series 1 (2003) ===
| No. overall | No. in series | Title | Directed by | Written by | Original release date | UK viewers (millions) |
|---|---|---|---|---|---|---|
| 1 | 1 | "First Impressions" | Paul Walker | John Flanagan and Andrew McCulloch | 19 January 2003 | 11.96 |
Newly qualified doctor Dr. David Cheriton arrives at the Royal, but is soon thrown into the deep end when he must take over from Dr. Alway. Jill's professional competence is called into question by the father of a young girl who needs urgent surgery to overcome a painful condition. Hopkirk attempts to get a television setup in the hospital, but his efforts to put up an aerial nearly causes an accident.
| 2 | 2 | "Second Time Around" | Terry McDonough | Deborah Cook | 26 January 2003 | 10.68 |
Jill and Sister Brigid attempt their best to help a young man deal with the tragic loss of his girlfriend following a motorbike accident, but are unable to do much to heal his broken heart. Gordon is suspicious over why one of his patients is reluctant to return home, until Matron and Lizzie discover the problem is with the patient’s wife. Hopkirk and Alun face turn to recent arrival, Claude Greengrass, for a way to deal with a mice infestation.
| 3 | 3 | "Coffin Fit" | Paul Walker | Mark Holloway | 2 February 2003 | 10.09 |
Jill deals with a female patient who is unwilling to accept that she has a possible heart condition that is serious. Gordon asks Meryl to aid Cheriton as he heads out to deal with a traffic accident, in which a young girl needs urgent surgery to save her life. Greengrass attempts to conduct smuggling within the hospital involving a coffin containing cigars, but his plans go up in smoke.
| 4 | 4 | "Sister of Mercy" | Keith Boak | Jane Hollowood | 9 February 2003 | 9.77 |
Sister Brigid discovers a newborn baby on the steps of the hospital, which leads Gordon to discover the mother is a young girl whose parents are shocked with what he tells them. Greengrass convinces Hopkirk to invest in tins of caviar from a Russian fishing crew, but they get more than they bargained for. Middleditch attempts to keep the hospital in order as it faces an inspection from the Health Authority, while Cheriton develops feelings for Meryl during a night out.
| 5 | 5 | "Immediate Care" | Keith Boak | Deborah Cook | 16 February 2003 | 9.03 |
Cheriton has the unenviable task of informing a young woman she has acute leukaemia, leading the hospital to comfort her and help her with marrying her lover. Hopkirk becomes suspicious when Greengrass takes bets on an upcoming horse race, after he picks up a tip from a visiting jockey. Gordon risks everything to save a patient from an accident at a railway yard, while Middleditch faces another inspection from Health Authority member Mr. Harper.
| 6 | 6 | "Kiss and Tell" | Tim Dowd | Neil McKay | 23 February 2003 | 9.63 |
Gordon and Jill investigate the cause of a schoolboy's illness, and soon discover it is down to anxiety over his father's well-being following his mother's death. Cheriton becomes suspicious a patient recently admitted to the wards is an imposter and turns to a visiting police officer for help, whilst they are receiving treatment for a bunion. Middleditch seeks advice from a retired solicitor, brought in by Jill following an accident, as the hospital faces the possibility of closure by the Health Authority.
| 7 | 7 | "Crash" | Tim Dowd | Mark Holloway | 2 March 2003 | 9.71 |
As Dr. Alway prepares for retirement, a serious coach crash forces him to stay on for a little longer as the Royal deals with the influx of patients from the accident. Gordon and Jill soon attend but make a shocking discovery that leaves one of them confused and horrified. Cheriton's relationship with Meryl is soon complicated with news from London. Greengrass is re-admitted to hospital, losing some money in the process which Hopkirk is forced to recover, especially when a new arrival presents problems for the hospital staff.

=== Series 2 (2003) ===
| No. overall | No. in series | Title | Directed by | Written by | Original release date | UK viewers (millions) |
|---|---|---|---|---|---|---|
| 8 | 1 | "All at Sea" | Keith Boak | Sarah Bagshaw | 25 May 2003 | 7.04 |
Cheriton and Meryl find themselves working together when they tend to an accident out at sea on a fishing trawler. Jill performs an urgent hysterectomy on a young woman who an illegal abortion, while Matron tries to comfort her fiancé when he learns what happened. Gordon struggles with his work in the wake of his wife's accident. Greengrass is shocked when he finds himself reunited with his long-lost daughter. Hopkirk offers to help a friend with a problem before the opening night of their new fish and chip shop.
| 9 | 2 | "Snakes and Ladders" | Paul Duane | Michael Russell | 1 June 2003 | 7.32 |
Cheriton becomes concerned for the mental well-being of a teenage boy he brought into the Royal, especially when he attempts suicide. Risking the anger of the boy's own psychiatrist, Cheriton turns to visiting psychiatrist Lucy Klein for help. Jill offers comfort to Gordon as he undergoes a difficult period in his life. Harper returns to oversee improving the hospital, despite a snake being set loose by accident within the building by one of its patients.
| 10 | 3 | "Thicker Than Water" | Paul Walker | Jane Hollowood | 8 June 2003 | 7.52 |
Jill becomes concerned for the health of a Catholic mother as she draws close to giving birth to another child, pushing Sister Brigid to suffer a crisis of faith on deciding what is best for the patient. A hunting trip ends in disaster when the father and husband of a family is fatally shot and dies before he can be treated, with Gordon left to comfort the family until he discovers something is not right. Harper clashes with Hopkirk, as the two determine who and what is best for the hospital laundry.
| 11 | 4 | "Wishing And Hoping" | Michael Russell | Judith Dine | 15 June 2003 | 6.75 |
Cheriton comes to the aid of a young girl whose parents bring her in for treatment for whooping cough, but is soon shocked when she was not vaccinated against her condition, prompting panic amongst other families when the girl dies. Gordon's struggle with his wife's situation puts more pressure on him during his work, leading Middleditch to provide a solution. Mr Rose decides to operate on his foot himself but soon regrets his decision, while Harper decides to find a cheaper alternative for taking patients home.
| 12 | 5 | "One of Those Days" | Terry McDonough | John Flanagan & Andrew McCulloch | 22 June 2003 | 7.19 |
Gordon's emotional pressure soon brings out the worst in him, when he fails to save a life and is unwilling to listen to a hypochondriac woman whose sight is at serious risk. Jill and Sister Brigid face a race against time to save a pregnant woman's child, even when all hope seems lost. Mr Rose takes drastic action to save a young man, after a brawl with a friend leaves him suffering from a serious brain haemorrhage. Meryl becomes concerned her relationship with Cheriton has caused unwelcome problems for herself.
| 13 | 6 | "The Last Waltz" | Paul Duane | Mark Holloway | 29 June 2003 | 7.16 |
Lucy suspects one of Gordon's patients may have a mental condition when he claims he has a physical condition he doesn't have. Jill faces a traumatic time when she attempts to treat a female factory worker who has contracted syphilis. Cheriton faces problems with setting up a charity ball in the hospital grounds, which places strain on his relationship with Meryl. Gordon receives bad news regarding his wife's condition, while Mr Rose advises an elderly husband to prepare for the worst when his wife is found to have cancer.

=== Series 3 (2003–04) ===
| No. overall | No. in series | Title | Directed by | Written by | Original release date | UK viewers (millions) |
|---|---|---|---|---|---|---|
| 14 | 1 | "The Unbreakable Chain" | Adrian Bean | Sarah Bagshaw | 16 November 2003 | 9.47 |
Gordon finds himself treating the mother of a farming family that is suffering a crisis since her husband's death, prompting Hopkirk and Alun to come to their aid. Jill and Sister Brigid deliver a baby with Down's syndrome that is soon rejected by the parents, until the pair convince them to reconsider. New student nurse Samantha Beaumont creates a stir when she arrives, and Lizzie's new crash diet with slimming pills nearly becomes disastrous.
| 15 | 2 | "If Not For You" | Adrian Bean | Deborah Cook | 23 November 2003 | 9.35 |
Gordon and Middleditch receive false accusations from a woman leading Jill and Lucy to suspect she may be mentally ill after learning more about her. Sister Brigid helps a married couple after the husband suffers a stroke during a road accident. Harper organises a rugby match between the Royal and Ashfordly General but it soon ends in tragedy when Cheriton dies after a rough tackle leaving Meryl deeply heartbroken.
| 16 | 3 | "Doing The Rounds" | Tim Dowd | Mark Holloway | 30 November 2003 | 8.77 |
New doctor Dr. Jeff Goodwin has a tough first day when his car and medical bag are stolen, as he finds himself dealing with two patients who urgently need treatment. Sister Brigid provides comfort to the housekeeper of a retired priest who is slowly dying from pneumonia. Meryl is shocked that Cheriton's mother doesn't know about her, as she arrives to collect her son's possessions following his funeral.
| 17 | 4 | "Consequences" | Tim Dowd | John Flanagan & Andrew McCulloch | 7 December 2003 | 10.54 |
Gordon faces a difficult dilemma when his father-in-law, Henry, suggests they turn off his wife's life-support machine, due to his increasing attraction to Jill. Jeff risks endangering his career when he decides to call in a bonesetter to cure a back injury of one of his patients. Samantha is less than impressed when she accepts a date with Alun, while Hopkirk attempts to deal with a patient's pet parrot when it causes chaos.
| 18 | 5 | "Poison" | Paul Duane | Mark Holloway | 14 December 2003 | 9.14 |
Gordon and Jill investigate a dinner guest's claim that his wife is killing him, but their investigation reveal the man's symptoms are connected to something more tragic. Lucy comes to the aid of a patient with a sleepwalking disorder by making them face the personal issues that are causing it. Jeff faces a trying time after he wrongly accuses a café owner of poisoning a local jazz band. Samantha deals with a rumour about her and Mr Rose, after Alun witnesses them together.
| 19 | 6 | "Famous for a Day" | Tim Dowd | Jane Hollowood | 21 December 2003 | 8.84 |
Gordon calls upon a miracle to help him at Christmas, as he works to save the life of a young boy who had fallen beneath the surface of an icy lake. Jeff deals with a local man who received a blow to his head, and soon discovers his family have serious issues, especially when his elderly father is dumped at the hospital and others are eventually admitted in due cause. A TV film crew announces its arrival to the Royal to film a live special for the festive holidays, which excites Harper until he is left literally speechless on camera.
| 20 | 7 | "Skin Deep" | Paul Duane | Sarah Bagshaw | 28 December 2003 | 8.41 |
Goodwin deals with a young woman who was involved in an accident with car, but soon has to stop her hurting Lucy when she turns out to be one of her patients she had committed to an asylum. Hopkirk and Alun do everything in their power to ensure Harper secures his posting at the Royal, even if it means sabotaging the interview process of the other candidates. Matron provides advice to the wife of a man who faces an uncertain future after becoming paralysed below the waist. Gordon and Jill find their relationship has been found out by the other staff members as they prepare to end it, unknowingly upsetting Sister Brigid who decides to return to her convent.
| 21 | 8 | "Cliffhanger" | John Greening | Mark Holloway | 4 January 2004 | 9.39 |
Goodwin and Mr Rose find themselves dealing with a young man with a gunshot wound. The matter is soon complicated when the patient's friend brandishes a revolver and forces them to treat him, creating a standoff between him and the police. Gordon comes to the aid of some fossil collectors when one of them is hurt in a landslide, prompting Matron to convince Sister Brigid to return to the hospital when she offers her help at the accident. Hopkirk arranges for some of the patients to watch a football match in the nurse's home, after one of them is desperate to see it on television.
| 22 | 9 | "All the Fun of the Fair" | John Greening | Nick Saltrese | 11 January 2004 | 8.93 |
A travelling fair comes to Elsinby, bringing some interesting cases for the Royal. Jeff comes to the aid of a waltzer operator, after he causes his son to suffer an accident while setting up their ride. Hopkirk takes advantage of a fortune teller, as they undergo treatment in hospital and receive some surprising news in the process. Jill treats a man for a facial injury and questions his wife about the circumstances, eventually discover both are being blackmailed on a secret the husband has been keeping.
| 23 | 10 | "Holding on Tight" | Tim Dowd | Patrick Melanaphy | 18 January 2004 | 9.28 |
Following a bachelor party, the groom and his party, close mod friends of Alun, are brought into hospital in a drunken state. Jeff soon confirms they had their drinks spiked with industrial alcohol by one of the group, with the groom left permanently blind and uncertain about his future marriage to his fiancé. Gordon and Mr Rose help treat an elderly woman at her remote home with a gangrenous toe, giving Samantha a chance to improve her nursing skills. Jill comes to the aid of a female dancer, who soon learns the truth about her dance partner's true feelings towards her.
| 24 | 11 | "For Those In Peril" | Tim Dowd | Deborah Cook | 25 January 2004 | 9.35 |
Jeff is puzzled about an illness plaguing a local dairy farmer, but an investigation so traces the cause and narrowly prevents him from nearly succumbing to the same illness. A young woman is found near the hospital in a terrible condition, and soon receives help from Sister Brigid when her circumstances are deeply rooted to her parents' fractured marriage. Hopkirk comes to the aid of father when his son is badly injured in a freak accident. A local tramp dies peacefully on the hospital grounds who is soon identified as a Navy hero from his medals, but when their closest relative is more interested in having them than arranging their funeral, Mr Rose decides the tramp deserves better when the hospital makes arrangements.
| 25 | 12 | "Reckoning" | Graeme Harper | Sarah Bagshaw | 1 February 2004 | 8.93 |
Gordon faces a difficult day when he learns the police are investigating allegations that he assisted his late wife's death following her accident. A married couple finds their marriage in trouble when their young son is diagnosed with a heart condition, only for tests to reveal that the husband isn't his father. Jeff and Samantha aid a new mother when she suffers kidney failure, and slowly bond in the process. Hopkirk is injured doing a task for Harper and faces the prospect of being fired.
| 26 | 13 | "Doing Time" | Graeme Harper | Nick Saltrese | 8 February 2004 | 8.89 |
The Royal tends to an accident involving a prison van that overturned on the moors. Gordon finds himself dealing with a seriously injured prison guard who refuses to accept he won't be going back to work, and then discovers one of his prisoners has a terminal condition but refuses to be paroled. Hopkirk finds himself asked by an injured prisoner from the crash to find his hidden stash, unaware that a third prisoner who escaped in the accident is hunting it down for themselves. Jeff comes to the aid of a new mother who behaves oddly, only for Lucy to suspect she might be suffering from post-natal depression.
| 27 | 14 | "Home To Roost" | Tim Dowd | John Flanagan & Andrew McCulloch | 15 February 2004 | 9.20 |
Gordon is shocked when Henry reveals he had him under investigation by a private detective, fearful he was cheating on his late wife with Jill. However, Gordon is adamant to dispel any false rumours, giving him a chance to strength his relationship with Jill to the point of making an unexpected proposal. Jeff becomes concern for a young girl who is painfully thin, but resents Lucy trying to diagnose her condition until it transpires she is correct. A retired colonel dies before reaching hospital, but the body soon becomes a health concern after his method of suicide is uncovered. Mr Rose tries a new hair piece for his head, but soon regrets it.

=== Series 4 (2004–05) ===
| No. overall | No. in series | Title | Directed by | Written by | Original release date | UK viewers (millions) |
|---|---|---|---|---|---|---|
| 28 | 1 | "For Better For Worse" | Terry McDonough | Deborah Cook | 5 December 2004 | 9.43 |
As Jill and Gordon prepare for their upcoming wedding day with bachelor and bachelorette parties, Jeff becomes concerned over the well-being of elderly residents in a care home after removing one of them for treatment at the Royal. His concerns are soon justified when the home is suddenly rocked by a gas explosion, leaving several staff and residents dead and many more fighting for their lives. While Jeff questions why he didn't do more, the rest of the hospital, including new ambulance driver Frankie Robinson, cope with the emergency on hand. Lizzie is distraught after learning that her husband has left her for another woman, but puts it to one side as she provides refreshments for the staff and patients during the emergency.
| 29 | 2 | "Beggers and Choosers" | Terry McDonough | Sarah Bagshaw | 12 December 2004 | 9.27 |
Jeff is horrified to discover a teenage boy has been badly injured in an industrial accident, but that the owner of the machinery will not offer compensation. At the same time, the hospital comes to the aid of a homeless man who is slowly dying due to his years of drinking. Frustrated in both cases, Jeff pleads for compassionate help from a visiting solicitor who is being treated for his own condition. Lizzie attempts to come to terms with her marriage falling apart, despite others not approving of the new attitude she exudes. Frankie attracts affection from Meryl, but is more interested in Samantha during a party at the Ormerods.
| 30 | 3 | "No Room for Ravers" | Frank W Smith | Mark Holloway | 19 December 2004 | 7.80 |
Jill investigates why a man has come to her with symptoms he does not have, but soon finds herself in danger when she discovers they are for a former soldier who has become mentally unstable due to past traumas. Alun faces a tough decision on where his priorities lie, when an elderly woman breaks her hip while complaining about the group's noisy practice above her flat. Hopkirk takes delight when he learns that Harper is making frequent, secretive visits to a local woman to deal with an embarrassing problem.
| 31 | 4 | "The Rose Queen" | Frank W Smith | John Flanagan & Andrew McCulloch | 9 January 2005 | 7.88 |
Gordon becomes concerned over the health of a father, whose son is ill with chickenpox, but soon realises too late that the father is seriously ill and faces deep regret when his condition worsens. Jeff discovers a patient is reluctant to confirm he got mercury poisoning from fish he poached, especially when the landowner he poached from is threatening legal trouble. Jill becomes involved in a difficult rescue to save a young girl after she falls off a cliff, but soon gives her a present to help with her recovery. Harper installs a vending machine, but soon faces complaints that it produces less-than appetising drinks.
| 32 | 5 | "It's What's on the Inside That Counts" | Ken Grieve | Patrick Melanaphy | 16 January 2005 | 8.31 |
Jill faces an ethical battle when the parents of a dangerously ill baby refuse to let it be saved with a blood transfusion on the grounds of their religious beliefs. Gordon becomes concerned for the health of a boxer, especially when his manager forces him to endure another boxing match. Meryl becomes concerned for a friend following an accident, especially when they appear to not recall what happened. Harper takes delight in recruiting a new nurse, but Matron soon discovers there is more to them than meets the eye. Samantha struggles with her shift, but is shocked when she learns it was due to her being pregnant.
| 33 | 6 | "Duty Bound" | Ken Grieve | Robin Mukherjee | 23 January 2005 | 8.53 |
Samantha struggles to cope with the reality of her situation, but is so desperate to have an abortion that she soon puts her life in danger. Jeff faces trouble when a casual encounter with a friend of Lizzie's soon becomes problematic. Gordon attempts to convince an elderly patient to give up driving due to increasing health issues. Sister Brigid attempts to convince a teenage boy to speak out against his trainer's harsh regime after he nearly dies when trapped on a weir. Ken offers to look after a pigeon, but is forced to keep it hidden when Harper begins to suspect something.
| 34 | 7 | "Sins of the Father" | Tim Dowd | Sarah Bagshaw | 30 January 2005 | 8.72 |
Stella Davenport, a nurse for the Royal, returns from Ashfordly General and quickly bonds with an elderly patient, only to be accused of stealing from them by their daughter. Matron and Harper interview a pregnant single mother for a job vacancy, but a premature birth leaves her daughter worried for their future. Gordon suspects a domestic dispute between a school headmaster and his wife, but cannot prevent the dramatic aftermath brought on by their son. Lizzie acquires a new scooter but discover it to be troubling purchase.
| 35 | 8 | "Everybody Needs Somebody" | Tim Dowd | Patrick Melanaphy | 6 February 2005 | 8.35 |
Matron is attacked by a thief stealing drugs, but while she struggles to cope with the shock, her colleague soon suspect there is more to the theft when the thief's young woman is admitted with signs of drug withdrawal shortly after the thief is brought in following an accident. Jeff finds his reputation in question when it becomes clear that Samantha's pregnancy is being blamed on him, most of all by Mr Rose. Gordon is forced to bring a farmer's wife in for treatment for tuberculosis, but her infectious state raises concerns it could have spread amongst several schoolchildren, including one with a heart condition.
| 36 | 9 | "Say a Little Prayer" | Graeme Harper | Jane Hollowood | 13 February 2005 | 8.06 |
Sister Brigid faces a struggle to convince the superior of her convent to seek medical help, especially when it becomes obvious she is seriously ill despite her refusal to see a doctor. Jill investigates what killed an infant during a young mother's pregnancy, who soon is shocked when she learns it was an infection she caught while helping her father. Frankie decides to cement his relationship with Meryl, but is jealous when she tries to cheer up Jeff. Lizzie finds a neighbour threatening trouble over a tree, but Alun soon nearly kills himself when he and Hopkirk attempt to sort out the issue.
| 37 | 10 | "The Way We Were" | Graeme Harper | Deborah Cook | 20 February 2005 | 7.95 |
Two cavers are brought into the Royal after an accident, but while Sister Brigid convinces one of them to stay on top of the diabetes they suffer from, Jill is left investigating a mysterious infection the other has. Jeff is shocked to discover that Frankie was the father of Samantha's baby, but while Mr Rose is willing to forgive him, Meryl is deeply shocked to learn the truth about her boyfriend's actions. Matron is shocked when Johnny Lomax, a face from the past, turns up at the hospital, bringing back fond memories of the time they spent together.
| 38 | 11 | "Sinking Feeling" | Frank W Smith and Judith Dine | John Flanagan & Andrew McCulloch | 27 February 2005 | 8.87 |
Harper makes plans to find a replacement for Matron when she accepts a marriage proposal from Johnny, but things soon end in tragedy when her fiancé dies following his operation. Sister Brigid and Jill face problems when a Catholic priest disapproves of their recent actions in each woman's recent decisions. Frankie assists Gordon with a tough rescue operation aboard a sinking fishing trawler, only to return to find that his lies to Meryl are about to come undone and ruin his plans to marry her.
| 39 | 12 | "While the Cat's Away" | Judith Dine | Jane Hollowood | 6 March 2005 | 8.77 |
Harper undertakes drastic economic action when he mistakenly believes the hospital is in financial trouble, which soon backfires when the hospital boiler explodes due to his actions with it, leaving a dying patient to save the day with a generous gift. Jeff and Meryl work together to help on an emergency, but their closeness prompts Frankie to make a decision about his career in medicine. Jill fears for a woman's life when she discovers she has a dangerous condition, but Gordon's efforts to stop the woman's husband taking her away soon leaves his life in danger.

=== Series 5 (2006) ===
| No. overall | No. in series | Title | Directed by | Written by | Original release date | UK viewers (millions) |
|---|---|---|---|---|---|---|
| 40 | 1 | "Loved And Lost" | Tim Dowd | Sarah Bagshaw | 12 March 2006 | 8.78 |
Nurse Catherine Deane returns to the Royal to assist on the wards, but struggles with personal problems with her work and home life. Jeff breaks the news to a female patient that she has a terminal condition, and decides to convince her daughter to help look after her. Gordon and Frankie are forced to work together and soon find themselves dealing with a schoolgirl who desperate to be sent home, but her desperation soon causes serious trouble that culminates in Meryl dying in a freak accident.
| 41 | 2 | "Cometh the Hour, Cometh the Man" | Tim Dowd | Deborah Cook | 19 March 2006 | 8.88 |
Middleditch prepares to retire as the hospital administrator, leaving its future in the hands of his successor Adam Carnegie. Mr Rose is placed in a dangerous situation when he and a friend are involved in a serious accident during their round of golf. Jeff has concerns about a man's condition following a traffic accident, and soon makes a discovery that leaves his family with heartbreaking news. Gordon does his best to cope with his work, as he nears the day when he can remove the plaster cast on his leg.
| 42 | 3 | "Thinking Too Hard" | Tim O'Mara | Patrick Melanaphy | 26 March 2006 | 9.09 |
Jill tends to a nightclub owner who has symptoms of poisoning from an unknown source, and must soon alleviate suspicions from his son and glamorous wife, when both accuse the other of harming him for his money. Frankie is shocked to see Gordon struggling with his work as he tends to an accident at a local farm. Jeff involves himself in a young couple's battle to keep their bay from its grandfather. Lizze gains an admirer in stationary salesman.
| 43 | 4 | "Seeking Refuge" | Tim O'Mara | John Flanagan & Andrew McCulloch | 2 April 2006 | 8.87 |
Jeff comes to the aid of a pregnant woman who claims her husband is hitting her when drunk, but efforts to help soon cannot prevent the situation going tragically wrong. Gordon struggles with his work and begins to become addicted to his medication. Jill tends to an AWOL soldier who fears being sent to fight to Vietnam, but soon finds him a reason to avoid it when she discovers his illness may be due to a blood condition.
| 44 | 5 | "Fever" | Duncan Foster | Mark Holloway | 9 April 2006 | 8.84 |
Staff at the Royal are shocked when two patients on the wards are found to be infected with typhoid. As they are forced to contain a possible epidemic, as a casualty patient and a pregnant woman show the same symptoms, the source is soon traced to contaminated meat used by the hospital kitchen. The situation soon causes Jill to chastises Gordon for nearly causing problems, prompting him to admit the truth about his nightmares on his accident.
| 45 | 6 | "Letting Go" | Duncan Foster | Stephen Bennett | 16 April 2006 | 8.04 |
Jill and Gordon are concerned about a single mother's condition when she arrives at hospital with burns, but soon discover she is struggling at home with her son who they soon discover may be suffering from a medical condition he cannot control. Frankie accidentally stabs a thief who steals his motorbike, and soon becomes worried he caused them to crash when they are later brought in to casualty and later die from their injuries.
| 46 | 7 | "Love Is All You Need" | Tim Dowd | Jane Hollowood | 17 September 2006 | 7.26 |
A father's day out at the beach with his family soon ends in tragedy when he collapses with pain, and an operation to save him discovers he has a tumour that damaged his intestine, later causing him to die from septic shock. Jeff attempts to help the same young couple regain control over their baby's welfare, but soon regrets his decision when they later do their child harm by accident. Carnegie takes a shine to Catherine, but is later berated for his behaviour to Jill and Jeff over their respective cases.
| 47 | 8 | "Waifs And Strays" | Tim Dowd | Sarah Bagshaw | 24 September 2006 | 6.22 |
Jeff discovers a couple illegally adopted a baby he is treating, but his efforts to reunite it with his mother, a local stripper, are not welcomed by the couple. With his operations suspended due to faulty lighting, Mr Rose joins Gordon when he visits a hippy encampment, and soon aids him in rescuing a child trapped in a dangerous situation. Catherine gains an admirer from Carnegie, as she treats a friend of her missing husband.
| 48 | 9 | "Winners and Losers" | Alan Wareing | Ken Blakeson | 1 October 2006 | 6.68 |
Dr Joan Makori arrives as a new locum for the Royal but finds a mother unwilling to let her see her sick child, until the child's condition worsens, leading her and Jeff to investigate further. Gordon treats a young man and a jockey for anaemia, one seeking employment to support his family, the other trying to remain in their job despite making themselves ill. Catherine goes on a date with Carnegie, even though he wishes to keep their relationship secret.
| 49 | 10 | "Price of Progress" | Alan Wareing | John Flanagan and Andrew McCulloch | 8 October 2006 | 7.17 |
Gordon is furious when Carnegie reveals that the Health Authority will not replace the Royal's x-ray machine after it breaks down, especially when an elderly man needing it is separated from his wife, and later dies after being sent to Ashfordly General. Joan accidentally leaves her handbag at a farm, but it soon leads her to rescuing a farming couple's young son from a serious infection. Stella bonds with a window cleaner, who is brought in following a misadventure.
| 50 | 11 | "Keep On Running" | Tim Dowd | Sarah Bagshaw | 15 October 2006 | 8.14 |
Gordon treats a chip shop owner for serious burns, but when it transpires they were caused by him attempting insurance fraud, he is not prepared for them taking their own life, even when it places Alun and another patient in serious danger. Joan is shocked when she learns that Jeff has received a job out in Africa. Jill encourages a woman to assert her independence against her brutish husband. Middleditch arrives to prevent the Royal suffering problems under Carnegie's administration.
| 51 | 12 | "From This Day Forward" | Tim Dowd | Stephen Bennett | 22 October 2006 | 7.30 |
A fishing trawler careers off track when its captain suffers a heart attack. When the crew are unable to prevent it striking a pier in Elsinby, it soon causes a disaster for a wedding reception being attended by Stella and Alun, when the pair begins to collapse. The Royal soon goes on an emergency footing, forcing Jeff to postpone his departure for his new job, and causing Carnegie to prove his true colours to Gordon. Unknown to her husband, Jill is close to labour during the crisis.

=== Series 6 (2007) ===
| No. overall | No. in series | Title | Directed by | Written by | Original release date | UK viewers (millions) |
|---|---|---|---|---|---|---|
| 52 | 1 | "Absent Friends" | Tim Dowd | Jane Hollowood | 25 March 2007 | 8.37 |
In Africa, Goodwin does his best to treat those who are suffering from a country's war, and soon finds himself making a promise to a dying woman to look after her daughter Nkeshi. At the Royal, staff have their hands full with local family the Beatties. Mr Rose treats a patient who thinks he has cancer. Carnegie makes plans to establish a private suite and Jill returns to work, which leave Gordon upset. Joan decides to join on in Jeff's absence as a partner in the hospital.
| 53 | 2 | "Home and Dry" | Tim Dowd | Sarah Bagshaw | 1 April 2007 | 8.06 |
Jeff returns to Britain with Nkeshi in tow, but faces opposition to his plans to let her stay after it becomes clear the young girl was brought into the country illegally. Carnegie's first private suite user, a singing superstar injured during a concert, is desperate to get out of her manager's bullying and soon creates a situation for Frankie. Jill faces a struggle convincing the head of the Beattie family to give up drinking for the sake of his loved ones.
| 54 | 3 | "Hoping for the Best" | Duncan Foster | John Flanagan & Andrew McCulloch | 8 April 2007 | 7.10 |
Joan finds herself offered a job in Cameroon much to her surprise, but with Jeff facing issues with Nkhesi, she soon contemplates accepting and using it to help provide the young girl a future. Sister Brigid comes to the aid of a married couple who crash while using their tandem, with staff convincing the wife to take action against her husband's controlling nature. Jill finds discovers the mother of the Beattie family is dying from cancer, and uses this to convince her husband to escape his alcoholism.
| 55 | 4 | "Fear of the Expected" | Duncan Foster | Patrick Melanaphy | 15 April 2007 | 8.05 |
Carnegie is delighted when a wealthy woman, who injured herself in a horse riding accident, is brought in to the Royal, but her chauffeur soon causes problems for Hopkirk and Frankie. Joan makes her plans to leave for Cameroon, with Jeff deciding to leave when he can to follow on, but faces issues when her mother questions her decision. The mother of the Beattie family passes away from her cancer, but tragedy soon strikes for the children when her husband struggles to cope without her.
| 56 | 5 | "Dr Who?" | Ian Bevitt | Mark Holloway | 22 April 2007 | 8.08 |
Dr Mike Banner arrives at the Royal in hopes of taking up Jeff's position, though a mix-up causes him to be one of two seeking the posting until Mr Rose provides a solution in the course of his visit. Catherine decides to make her feelings to Carnegie clear as day after discovering she is pregnant. A night out for Stella ends badly when a male guest at a party she attends rapes her.
| 57 | 6 | "Cursed and Blessed" | Ian Bevitt | Sarah Bagshaw | 29 April 2007 | 6.78 |
An expectant mother arrives at the Royal for treatment, but her ex-husband soon turns up to harass her, causing Jill to investigate the matter. After her assault, Stella is shocked when police are doubtful about her accusation, leaving her concerned for her future. Jeff is surprised when a friend he thought lost in Africa turns up in Elsinby. Catherine considers her future at the hospital.
| 58 | 7 | "Starting Over" | Tim Dowd | Marc Pye | 16 September 2007 | 6.62 |
Marian McKaig, the new Staff Nurse, arrives at the Royal to replace Catherine following her departure, and soon makes waves with both Stella and Alun. Middleditch makes a surprise visit to the hospital, after managing to hurt his ankle while fishing. A frantic mother calls on Mike for help to see her husband, who is quite hostile and refuses to receive help for a medical condition he has.
| 59 | 8 | "Coming to the Boil" | Tim Dowd | John Flanagan & Andrew McCulloch | 23 September 2007 | 6.64 |
Gordon is shock when a young boy is brought in with anthrax, but as an investigation is made into the source, no one can predict the outcome when the infection is traced to the farm of a former RAF pilot. Mike treats a woman who complains of dizzy spells, and soon receives help from Mr Rose to investigate the cause. Jill is surprised when Carnegie presents his plans for the hospital's future. Lizzie and Alun are intrigued by the arrivel of Susie Dixon, who Matron seems to know.
| 60 | 9 | "Scabs" | Ian Bevitt | Mark Holloway | 30 September 2007 | 6.62 |
Gordon becomes concerned about his daughter's piano teacher after they are brought into hospital, and soon discovers he has a deep secret in his past. Alun is injured after falling for Susie, as she causes headaches for Matron, forcing Hopkirk to convince the head of a porter's strike to assist. Mike takes pity on a mother with a sick child, and proves himself with Gordon. Jill looks to help out an elderly patient with a serious lung condition.
| 61 | 10 | "Laura" | Ian Bevitt | Jane Hollowood | 21 October 2007 | 6.84 |
Mike aids a married couple involved in a train collision to their car, but he and Marian soon learn they had a child that has gone missing, which could add further woe to the suffering the couple are going through. Jill discovers a local farmer's erratic behaviour has all the signs of a mental breakdown. Stella faces her past when her rapist is brought in after being attacked by the father of another victim. Hopkirk decides to give Matron a break, by having Susie do odd jobs in the hospital.
| 62 | 11 | "Can't Buy Me Love" | Tim Dowd | John Flanagan & Andrew McCulloch | 28 October 2007 | 6.79 |
Gordon is surprised when his ex-father-in-law turns up with news he is dying, but is shocked when leaves an inheritance for his family after he dies from his condition. Mike tries to assist a 50-year-old autistic man who is facing a difficult future. Jill breaks bad news about a young girl's condition when it turns out to be cancer. Adam's reputation is tarnished after his fund-raising efforts backfire. Hopkirk is forced to confess to the staff about a mistake he made.
| 63 | 12 | "Love and Loss" | Tim Dowd | Sarah Bagshaw | 4 November 2007 | 7.04 |
Jill recovers a seriously ill baby from the woman who abducted her for their own reasons, but her success is soon overshadowed when her pregnancy she recently learnt about begins to suffer dangerous complications. Gordon and Mr Rose are puzzled when a farmer with a diabetic condition suddenly begins displaying different symptoms upon his admission. Susie causes chaos when she arranges a fake séance, before announcing to Matron her plans to become a nurse herself.

=== Series 7 (2008–09) ===
| No. overall | No. in series | Title | Directed by | Written by | Original release date | UK viewers (millions) |
|---|---|---|---|---|---|---|
| 64 | 1 | "Against All Odds" | Ian Barber | John Flanagan & Andrew McCulloch | 22 June 2008 | 5.46 |
Returning home to Elsinby, Marian finds herself working with new locum Dr Nick Burnett - replacing Mike due to a family emergency - when the train they are on derails suddenly. As Gordon and Frankie head to the accident with the ambulances sent to attend, the hospital prepares itself for the influx of wounded needing help. However, Nick and Marian soon find a married couple need urgent help after being trapped in a carriage that is at risk of being set alight.
| 65 | 2 | "On the Road" | Ian Barber | John Flanagan & Andrew McCulloch | 29 June 2008 | 4.69 |
Carnegie disapproves when Nick admits several homeless people from Elsinby to the hospital. Gordon is reluctant to let Jill take on heavy duties. However his plans fall apart when she is called to attend to road along the coast when a female victim of a car accident goes into labour. Meanwhile, Matron is stunned when she sees who is the new student nurse, and patient who enjoys gossip discloses where Ken is.
| 66 | 3 | "Blood's Thicker Than Water" | Dominic Keavey | Marc Pye | 6 July 2008 | 4.26 |
An accident at the harbour leaves a fisherman concerned for the future of his family when Burnett is forced to amputate his hand. Weatherill treats a woman admitted with pneumonia who is deeply concerned about her father's presence around her daughter. Ken bids a final farewell to The Royal, but Lizzie's resolve flounders at the last minute.
| 67 | 4 | "Slings and Arrows" | Dominic Keavey | Sarah Bagshaw | 13 July 2008 | 5.41 |
Eric Fogle is appointed as new head porter, putting Alun's nose out of joint. The hospital receives a letter of resignation from Dr Banner in Australia and has to appoint a partner to the practice — Weatherill believes she knows just the person, but Dr Ormerod favours Dr Burnett. Elsewhere, when Lucy Bayliss is involved in a horse-riding accident an X-ray reveals a more long-term problem.
| 68 | 5 | "To Love and to Lose" | David Kester | Patrick Melanaphy | 20 July 2008 | 5.12 |
Maria Dannini suffers injury when her ice-cream parlour is vandalised, but further revelations lead to a more serious medical situation. Sister Brigid faces a dilemma when her pregnant sister Moira arrives wanting advice on an abortion. Elsewhere, a cunning Susie has a plan to get rid of Eric, and Burnett decides to stay at The Royal.
| 69 | 6 | "Stolen Dreams" | David Kester | Jane Hollowood | 14 December 2008 | 5.13 |
An amusement arcade on the Elsinby seafront collapses while its being renovated while open, creating a difficult situation for the Royal. As Jill struggles to save a young child who has a suspected blood-clotting disorder, confusion on where the mother is prompts Susie to take action to help. Frankie and Stella become trapped in the rubble trying to save a teenage girl, but declare their true feelings for each other, moments before the situations ends in tragedy.
| 70 | 7 | "Home from the Hill" | Ian Barber | Sarah Bagshaw | 21 December 2008 | 4.96 |
New ambulance driver Bobby Sheridan joins with Gordon as he is called to an accident on a remote farm, in which its elderly owner is forced to face the reality of their situation. Alun's new band perform on the opening night of a new nightclub, but it soon descends into chaos, leaving Susie and Marian to keep calm and do what they can. Carnegie redeems himself for his blunders by aiding in both cases. New porter Jack Bell gets off to a poor start on his first day.
| 71 | 8 | "Pastures New" | Ian Barber | Jonathan Critchley | 28 December 2008 | 4.62 |
Dr Burnett is called out to a dilapidated farmhouse, where a teenager is running a high fever and his family seem to be struggling to cope. As the staff try to diagnose the youngster's illness, his pregnant mother is rushed to the hospital with the same symptoms and is left fighting for her life. Meanwhile, Ormerod and Rose attend to Sir Edward Fawcett, an eccentric explorer who wants to hike around Mexico, despite having a condition that means his days of adventure are over while Jack has to secretly replace the hospital boiler without anyone knowing.
| 72 | 9 | "Busman's Holiday" | Dominic Keavey | Mark Holloway | 4 January 2009 | 5.77 |
Mr Middleditch makes a surprise announcement on his birthday which causes an argument between Weatherill and Ormerod, but the celebrations are interrupted when a bus full of day-trippers crashes down a nearby bank. Susie bets Lizzie she will get Carnegie to ask her out, and Jack is given a fright when a body in the mortuary springs back to life.
| 73 | 10 | "In the Air" | Dominic Keavey | John Flanagan & Andrew McCulloch | 21 June 2009 | 4.30 |
With Susie and Carnegie's relationship the talk of the hospital, Matron reaches the end of her tether when her niece turns up late for work and she decides to suspend her. Mr Rose faces a personal trial when his golfing friend ends up in the operating room and Dr Burnett wrestles with a dilemma. Ormerod and Bobby try to rescue a farmer who is trapped under a combine harvester.
| 74 | 11 | "Best of Intentions" | David Kester | Dawn Harrison | 28 June 2009 | 4.59 |
Dr Burnett races to save two schoolgirls who have fallen unconscious with carbon monoxide poisoning, while Susie has to think fast when Matron collapses during their picnic and ends up in hospital, giving the student nurse the chance to prove herself. Elsewhere, Weatherill gets to the bottom of a family problem involving a man training for the priesthood.
| 75 | 12 | "Compromising Positions" | David Kester | Sarah Bagshaw | 5 July 2009 | 4.62 |
Sister Brigid helps secure a future for Moira and her baby, but when events take a shocking turn Weatherill and Ormerod are left to make a heartbreaking decision. Susie tries her best to be a model nurse and breaks off her relationship with Carnegie - who then proposes to her - while Bobby takes matters into his own hands with the violent stepfather of a local thug. Return of Ian Carmichael as T.J. Middleditch. Last Appearance of Damian O'Hare as Dr Nick Burnett, Kari Corbett as Marian McKaig, Chris Coghill as Bobby Sheridan, Robert Cavanah as Adam Carnegie

=== Series 8 (2009–11) ===
| No. overall | No. in series | Title | Directed by | Written by | Original release date | UK viewers (millions) |
|---|---|---|---|---|---|---|
| 76 | 1 | "Safe As Houses" | David Kester | Sarah Bagshaw | 12 July 2009 | 4.53 |
Dr. Ormerod and Dr. Weatherill accompany Brigid back to Ireland for Moira's funeral, and uncover shocking family secrets in the process. Meanwhile, a new locum is thrown in at the deep end at the Royal. First appearances of Glynis Barber as Jean McAteer, Diana May as Staff Nurse Carol Selby, Neil McDermott as Dr Ralph Ellis
| 77 | 2 | "Counting Chickens" | David Kester | John Flanagan & Andrew McCulloch | 19 July 2009 | 4.69 |
Dr Ellis confronts local prejudice when he discovers one of his patients, a schoolgirl from China, contracted a rare disease there. Jack and Alun begin a crackpot scheme to raise chickens, Brigid makes a decision about baby Aisling's future, while Jean becomes more frustrated with Lizzie's incompetence.
| 78 | 3 | "These Foolish Things" | Ian Barber | Susan Wilkins | 26 July 2009 | 4.94 |
Weatherill treats a schoolgirl whose crush on a teacher has spiralled out of control, while Ormerod and Ellis launch a daring cliff rescue when a family picnic goes awry. Jack and Alun use an old map to hunt for buried treasure underneath the hospital, and an old friend of Matron is taken ill.
| 79 | 4 | "Any Old Iron" | Ian Barber | Mark Holloway | 5 June 2011 | 4.66 |
Mr Middleditch has come into St Aidan's hospital, accompanied by his wife, for a routine operation. Noticing that Mrs Middleditch (Susan Hampshire) looks unwell, then vomited blood from her stomach ulcer, the hospital decides to give her a blood transfusion. Distracted by the attentions of a rich divorced playboy, who has promised to marry her, Susie Dixon administers the wrong blood, that of Mr Middleditch, which later results in serious consequences for both her and the patient. But she is ditched at the altar. Dr Weatherill manages to save Mrs Middleditch’s life, although it’s touch and go for a time. Dr Ormerod is called out by the coastguard to rescue a grieving widow who has got into difficulty on her yacht. Dr Ormerod uncovers some family secrets and persuades his patient that she does have a future to look forward to. A rag-and-bone man is collecting some scrap from Jack and Alun but is trampled by his horse and admitted to the Royal for surgery. Jack and Alun are left to look after the horse, with comic consequences. Final appearances of Sarah Beck Mather as Nurse Susie Dixon and Ian Carmichael as T.J. Middleditch. Ian Carmichael died on 5 February 2010 at the age of 89.
| 80 | 5 | "Should I Stay or Should I Go Now" | Neil Adams | Patrick Melanaphy | 12 June 2011 | 4.84 |
Lizzie falls for a motorcycle stunt rider who is convinced he’s destined to live fast, die young. But Dr Ormerod comes up with a different diagnosis. Faye Clarke, a new student nurse arrives at the Royal. An extremely timid, jumpy young girl, it’s her first time away from home. She’s faced with a trying first day when a beautiful young model collapses after mistakenly eating the Deathcap mushroom, thinking it to be Magic mushrooms, and dies. But Matron can see she has potential. Motorcycle stunt rider, Jimmy charms Lizzie when he falls off his bike and injures his wrist. Jimmy tells Dr Ormerod he has a hereditary medical condition – polycystic kidneys. He knows he hasn’t got long on this earth so he wants to live fast, die young. But tests reveal an altogether different diagnosis. But before Dr Ormerod can give him the good news, Jimmy takes Lizzie for a ride on the Wall of Death. He crashes the bike – has he used up all his nine lives? First Appearance of Lauren Drummond as Student Nurse Faye Clark
| 81 | 6 | "Please Release Me" | Neil Adams | Jane Hollowood | 19 June 2011 | 4.48 |
Dr Ormerod's career is on the line when a grieving family points the finger of suspicion at him. Dr Ellis deals with a different sort of outbreak at the prison, while Faye has to overcome her fear of needles when Jack requires a tetanus shot.
| 82 | 7 | "Tutti Frutti" | Tim Dowd | Mark Holloway | 26 June 2011 | 4.22 |
A secret from Jean's past comes back to haunt her; Dr. Weatherill must break some news to a young couple; Alun may have found true love.
| 83 | 8 | "Manoeuvres" | Tim Dowd | John Flanagan & Andrew McCulloch | 3 July 2011 | 4.20 |
A day at the park ends in disaster for the Ormerod family; Dr. Ellis risks getting too involved with a troubled patient.
| 84 | 9 | "Dead Air" | David Kester | Dawn Harrison | 10 July 2011 | 4.27 |
A siege takes place during a girls' trip on board a pirate radio ship; a leader recovers from a stroke. All filmed off the Isle of Wight on SS Shieldhall, a 1955 steamship still based in Southampton.
| 85 | 10 | "A Hero for Our Time" | David Kester | Susan Wilkins | 17 July 2011 | 4.90 |
A builder disconnects the wrong pipes, causing a flood; a car crashes into the lake during Jack's fishing trip. Jean faces an uphill battle with the DHA when the Chairman's daughter is treated at the Royal.
| 86 | 11 | "Below the Surface" | David Kester | John Flanagan & Andrew McCulloch | 24 July 2011 | 3.98 |
A 15-year-old boy is shot by an intruder with his grandfather's shotgun. Dr. Weatherill risks everything to save a homeless man trapped at a building site. An unexpected donor appears to offer funding for the repair of the casualty department.
| 87 | 12 | "The Enemy Within" | Ian Barber | Sarah Bagshaw | 31 July 2011 | 4.13 |
Dr. Ormerod opens a can of worms when he attends to the problems of a local family. When violence spills onto the wards, Ormerod is caught in the crossfire and is stabbed with scissors, which leaves his life hanging in the balance. However, we know from The Royal Today, Episode 11, that Dr Ormerod must have survived. His son Jonathan, a baby at the time of the attack but an experienced doctor now, recalls advice his father gave him: a doctor is a detective, and can find out a lot by persuading the patients to talk to him, because they usually know more than they think.
