= William Corlett =

English author (1938–2005)

- Born: 8 October 1938; Darlington, County Durham
- Died: 16 August 2005 (aged 66); Sarlat, Aquitaine, France
- Occupations: Novelist, playwright
- Writing career
- Period: 1963–2004

William Corlett (8 October 1938 – 16 August 2005), was an English author, best known for his quartet of children's novels, The Magician's House, published between 1990 and 1992.

== Biography ==
Corlett was born in Darlington, County Durham. He was educated at Fettes College, Edinburgh, then trained as an actor at the Royal Academy of Dramatic Art.

Later in life he came out as gay, and it was from his partner, Bryn Ellis, that he gained some of his inspiration for The Magician's House. Corlett died at Sarlat in France.

== Bibliography ==
=== Plays ===
- Another Round (1963)
- The Gentle Avalanche (1964)
- Return Ticket (1966)

=== Teleplay ===
- "Barriers" (1980)
- "The Red Signal", "Through a Glass Darkly", "The Fourth Man", and "The Girl in the Train", (1982) from the "Agatha Christie Hour" teleseries

=== Novels ===
- The Gate of Eden (1974)
- The Land Beyond (1974)
- Return to the Gate (1975)
- The Dark Side of the Moon (1977)
- Bloxworth Blue (1984)
- The Magician's House quartet
  - The Steps Up the Chimney (1990)
  - The Door in the Tree (1990)
  - The Tunnel behind the Waterfall (1991)
  - The Bridge in the Clouds (1992)
- The Summer of the Haunting (1993)
- The Secret Line (1995)
- Now and Then (1995)
- Two Gentlemen Sharing (1997)
- Kitty (2004)

=== Non-fiction ===
- The Hindu Sound (1978)
- The Christ Story (1978)
- The Islamic Space (1979)
- The Buddha Way (1980)
- The Judaic Law (1980)
