= Linda Armstrong (actress) =

English actress

Linda Armstrong is an English actress, known for her role as Sister Brigid in The Royal.

== Career ==
Armstrong played Sister Brigid in ITV's The Royal throughout the series. Her television debut was in an episode of Peak Practice. She has since played guest roles and semi-regular roles in various television series, including A Touch of Frost (ITV Series); Bugs (BBC Series); Dangerfield (BBC series); Casualty (BBC); The Bill (ITV); Brookside (Channel 4) and Doctors (BBC). In 2020, she portrayed the role of DI Dent in the ITV soap opera Emmerdale.

== Filmography ==
=== Film ===
Year	Film	Role	Notes
1997	The Mill on the Floss	Kezia	TV film
1998	Tess of the D'Urbervilles	Car Darch	TV film
2000	Rough Treatment	DC Walker	TV film

=== Television ===
Year	Film	Role	Notes
1996	Bugs	Prison Guard	Recurring role
1996	Peak Practice	Mary Ingham	Episode: "Whipping Boy"
1997	Casualty	Lisa Jensen	3 episodes
1998	The Vanishing Man	Waitress	Episode: "Not Fade Away"
1998	Dangerfield	Jill Redford	Episode: "The Long Weekend"
1999	Brookside	F.S.O. Diane Nichols	1 episode
1999	A Touch of Frost	D.I. Alice Beale	Episode: "One Man's Meat"
1999	The Bill	D.S. Melville	Episode: "Crash Landing"
2003	The Bill	Ruth	Episode: "Rose-Coloured Glasses"
2003	Heartbeat	Sister Brigid	Episode: "Out of the Blue"
2003–2011	The Royal	Sister Brigid	Series regular
2004	Doctors	Sheila Sefton	Episode: "When Love Hurts"
2008	Casualty	Jo Linden	Episode: "They May Not Mean to But They Do"
2009	Doctors	Alice Blunt	Episode: "Litmus"
2012	Doctors	Sharon Montague	Episode: "Indian Smith"
2014	Doctors	Sian	Recurring role
2015	Casualty	Amy Hills	Episode: "Excess Baggage"
2015	EastEnders	Katie McCoy	1 episode
2017	Doctors	Erin Keywood	Episode: "Cool Mom"
2018	Coronation Street	Prosecution Barrister	4 episodes
2019	Casualty	Ceri Kaplan	1 episode
2019	Doctors	Sally Tennant	Episode: "Exposure"
2020	Emmerdale	DI Dent	Recurring role
