= Kevin Lloyd =

English actor (1949–1998)

- Born: Kevin Reardon Lloyd; 28 March 1949; Derby, England
- Died: 2 May 1998 (aged 49); Burton upon Trent, Staffordshire, England
- Education: East 15 Acting School
- Spouse: Lesley Lloyd (1973–1998 - estranged since 1995)
- Partner: Rita Hudson (1995–1998)
- Children: 8 (1 adopted)

Kevin Reardon Lloyd (28 March 1949 – 2 May 1998) was an English television actor, who came to prominence in the role of DC Alfred "Tosh" Lines in Thames Television's police drama series The Bill.

== Early life ==
Kevin Reardon Lloyd was born in Derby Hospital on 28 March 1949. His Welsh father, Ellis Aled Lloyd, was a police officer who was killed in the line of duty on 20 February, 1970. Lloyd's grandfather and uncle were also police officers. He suffered from Perthes disease as a child. After leaving grammar school, he initially trained as a solicitor, before deciding that he wanted to be a professional actor. He studied acting at the East 15 Acting School in Loughton, Essex.

== Career ==
Prior to appearing in The Bill Lloyd had already played the high-profile role of nightclub owner Don Watkins in the soap opera Coronation Street. He also appeared in a number of other television shows, including the first series of Starting Out, Boon, Minder, Dear John, Farrington of the F.O., Dempsey and Makepeace, Z-Cars, Andy Capp, Auf Wiedersehen Pet, Blake's 7, The Honey Siege and Casualty. His film credits included roles in Trial by Combat (1976), Talent (1979), Britannia Hospital (1982), Don't Open till Christmas (1984), Link (1986) and Billy the Kid and the Green Baize Vampire (1987). He was also active on stage in the 1970s, appearing in a production of Joe Orton’s What the Butler Saw.

In 1992 he was a contestant on Cluedo, teaming up with newsreader Lisa Aziz, conceding to the winning team of Jenny Powell and Nigel Dempster.

=== The Bill ===
Lloyd joined the cast of The Bill in 1988, and appeared in more than 400 episodes over the next decade.

Lloyd was one of the most popular cast members of The Bill. In 1996, the show won the award for "Best TV Drama" at the National Television Awards and it was Lloyd who collected it on behalf of the cast and crew. Lloyd spoke of the similarities between himself and his character in the series, namely that he and Tosh were both short, scruffy and slightly overweight, and both had multiple children to support. He also drew on aspects of his late father’s personality and manner for his performance. He had been so popular on The Bill that on 26 February 1992, within four years of joining the show, he was selected as special guest for the TV guest show This Is Your Life.

== Death ==
A chronic alcoholic, he played "Tosh" until he was sacked from The Bill on 27 April 1998 after turning up for filming too intoxicated to work. Shortly afterwards, he entered a clinic in Burton upon Trent for medical supervision and a programme of alcohol detoxification, with the administration of antabuse. Whilst receiving treatment, he left the premises to consume alcohol. He returned to the clinic on 2 May 1998 in an intoxicated state, retired to bed, fell asleep, and died of asphyxia. His widow subsequently launched a legal action alleging negligence by the facility's medical staff, but lost the case in court. Lloyd died just one week after recording his final scenes for The Bill, and the character of Tosh was still appearing on-screen for more than a month following Lloyd's death. Tosh's final appearance was in the episode broadcast on 9 June 1998. Lloyd's funeral took place at St Alkmund's Church, Duffield; he was cremated following the church service.

Lloyd was close friends with fellow The Bill cast member Mark Wingett, and his death was one of the factors behind the decision to make Wingett's character Jim Carver an alcoholic the following year.

== Personal life ==
Lloyd was the older brother of ITN journalist Terry Lloyd, who was killed whilst reporting in the second Persian Gulf War in 2003.

Lloyd married Lesley in 1973. They had seven children: Mark, Sophie, James, Poppy, Henry, Edward and Chloe. In 1989, James, Poppy and Henry Lloyd appeared in an episode of The Bill as three of Tosh's children. James Lloyd is an actor who later appeared on The Bill as PC Steve Hunter between 2004 and 2006. Chloe Lloyd died from meningitis aged 17 months. In 1991, Lloyd and his wife adopted a Romanian orphan, Ellie. Lloyd lived with his family in Duffield, Derbyshire, from where he regularly commuted to London where The Bill was filmed. Lloyd separated from his wife in 1995, with his wife blaming his alcoholism and accusing him of violence. He was subsequently in a relationship with Rita Hudson for the next three years, although he had reportedly resumed his relationship with his wife shortly before his death.

He was a lifelong supporter of Derby County. In 1992, he was a subject on This Is Your Life, whereby the Derby County squad paid a video homage to him singing "We want Kevin Lloyd".

His autobiography, The Man Who Loved Too Much, was published in 1997.
