= Nigel Harman =

British actor (born 1973)

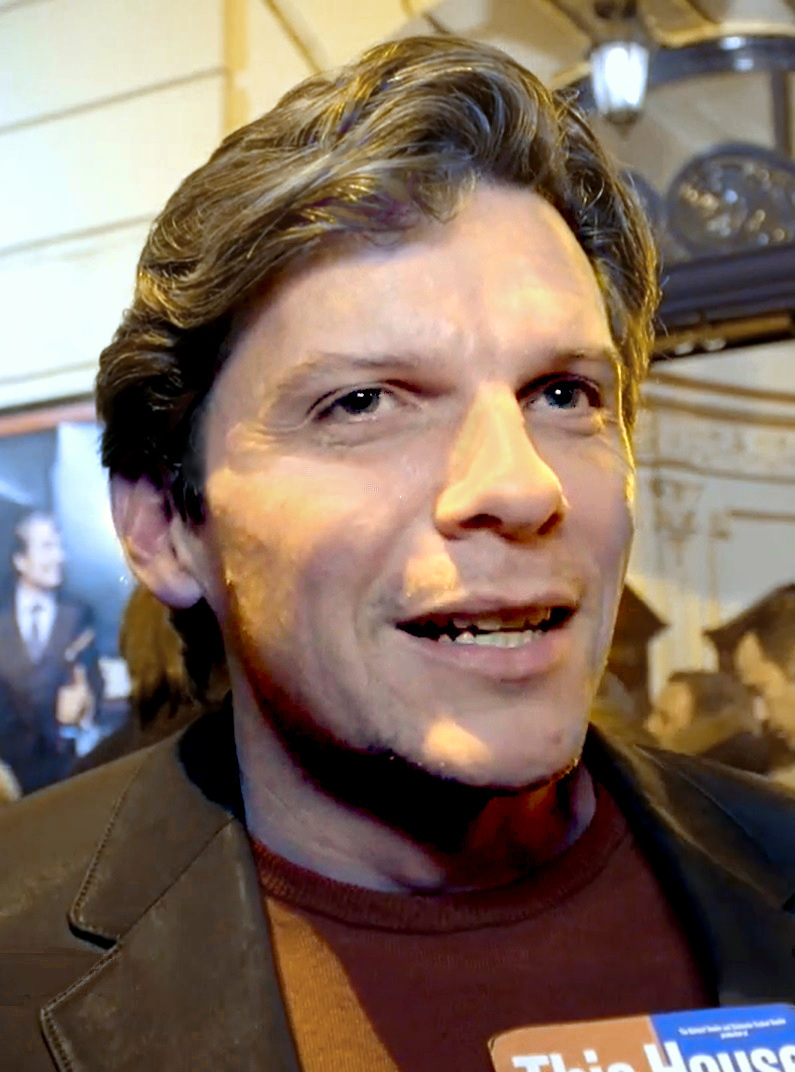
- Harman in 2016
- Born: Nigel Derek Harman; 11 August 1973 (age 53); London, England
- Education: Dulwich College; Arts Educational Schools, London
- Occupation: Actor
- Years active: 1984–present
- Notable work: See below
- Television: EastEnders; Downton Abbey; Casualty
- Height: 5 ft 10 in (1.78 m)
- Spouse: Lucy Liemann
- Children: 1

Nigel Derek Harman (born 11 August 1973) is an English actor. Beginning his career as a child actor, he has played various roles across theatre, stage and television, including as Sky Masterson in Michael Grandage's revival of Guys and Dolls and as Lord Farquaad in the original London production of Shrek the Musical, for which he received an Olivier Award.

Harman rose to prominence for his portrayal as Dennis Rickman in the BBC soap opera EastEnders (2003–2005). The role earned him a National Television Award, three British Soap Awards, and four Inside Soap Awards. He has landed other acting roles in The Bill, Downton Abbey, Doctors, Mount Pleasant, and Casualty.

== Early life ==
Harman grew up in Woldingham, Surrey, and was educated at Dulwich College. However, he found school difficult: "I was never comfortable sitting down. I always wanted to get involved in something, not just learn and write. I was in so much trouble I had my own desk in detention." His father was a bank manager, but also involved in amateur dramatics including work with Croydon Operatic and Dramatic Association (CODA), an interest which was passed on to Harman. His mother was also involved in the productions, but she died when Harman was 18.

== Career ==
=== Early career ===
By the age of eight, Harman had a manager, and in 1984, he made his first major television appearance in the BBC One drama series Tenko, which was followed by appearances in Alas Smith and Jones (1986) and The Honey Siege (1987). He then turned his hand to larger theatre roles, appearing in productions such as Privates on Parade, Much Ado About Nothing and Summer Holiday. He trained at Arts Educational Schools in London and was in the original cast of Mamma Mia!. Harman also performed in musicals on cruise ships for six and a half months, but later told Paul O'Grady that he hated the experience. Having only worked on the stage and in musical theatre since leaving school, Harman was determined to expand into television, and pursued TV roles. He had minor parts in episodes of Red Cap, Doctors and Coupling, but had to support himself by taking jobs at Pizza Hut and as a driver for supermarket chain Sainsbury's.

=== EastEnders ===
In 2003, he was cast in the high-profile role of Dennis Rickman in the BBC soap opera EastEnders. At the time, Harman was working as a delivery driver for supermarket chain Sainsbury's when he learned he had got the role. Harman left EastEnders on 5 November 2005, and his final episode was aired on 30 December 2005, in which Dennis was stabbed to death in the street by one of Johnny Allen's (Billy Murray) henchmen, later revealed to be Danny Moon.

=== Theatre work ===
After leaving EastEnders in December 2005, Harman appeared as Sky Masterson in Guys and Dolls at the Piccadilly Theatre, in the West End, alongside Jenna Russell and Nigel Lindsay. He opened alongside Sarah Lancashire, who left the production with illness on 4 January 2006. Harman left the show in March 2006. In April that year, he played Kerry Max Cooke in The Exonerated at Riverside Studio Theatre in Hammersmith, London.

In October 2006, Harman appeared in the Harold Pinter play The Caretaker at the Crucible Theatre in Sheffield, starring alongside David Bradley and Con O'Neill. The production toured from February to April 2007. The tour venues were the Theatre Royal, Brighton, Richmond Theatre and the Tricycle Theatre in Kilburn.

Harman resumed the role of Sky Masterson, joining the Guys and Dolls tour at the Alexandra Theatre, Birmingham in December 2006, and the Mayflower Theatre, Southampton in May 2007. From May to July 2008, he appeared in The Common Pursuit at the Menier Chocolate Factory for a limited run. From January to May 2009, he appeared alongside actors Lyndsey Marshal and James McAvoy in the play Three Days of Rain at the Apollo Theatre in London.

In November and December 2009, Harman appeared in Public Property by Sam Peter Jackson at the Trafalgar Studios. In May and June 2010, Harman acted in the stage production of True West at the Crucible Theatre in Sheffield. From May 2011 to February 2012, he played Lord Farquaad in the West End production of Shrek the Musical, at the Theatre Royal, Drury Lane. For his performance, he won the Olivier Award for Best Supporting Performance in a Musical and Theatregoers' Choice Award for Best Supporting Actor in a Musical.

From September 2012 to January 2013, Harman starred alongside Rob Brydon and Ashley Jensen in Alan Ayckbourn's A Chorus of Disapproval at the Harold Pinter Theatre in the West End.

In August 2013, it was announced Harman would play the role of Simon Cowell in the West End musical I Can't Sing! The X Factor Musical, which opened in February 2014 at the London Palladium. Despite positive reviews, the musical closed in May. The same year, Harman was revealed as the director for the UK tour of Shrek The Musical, which opened in July in Leeds and finished in February 2016 in Salford. The tour resumed in Edinburgh in December 2017.

In October 2016, he directed a double-bill of Lunch and The Bow of Ulysses by Steven Berkoff at the Trafalgar Studios. From January to February 2017, Harman starred alongside Sarah Hadland, Jamie Glover, Olivia Poulet and Raymond Coulthard, in the French comedy What's in a Name? at the Birmingham Repertory Theatre. Harman directed the London premiere of the musical Big Fish, starring Kelsey Grammer, which played at The Other Palace in November and December 2017.

From February to April 2019, Harman toured the UK opposite Mark Benton in David Mamet's play Glengarry Glen Ross. Harman played the lead as Robert Langdon in the stage adaptation tour of Dan Brown's The Da Vinci Code, which opened in January 2022 in Bromley. In March and April 2025 Harman starred in the London première of Jean-Philippe Daguerre’s play Farewell Mister Haffmann, adapted by Jeremy Sams, at the Park Theatre. Harman played the villain Fleshcreep in the Christmas pantomime Jack and the Beanstalk at Aylesbury Waterside Theatre from December 2025 to January 2026.

=== Film and television work ===
Harman's success on television and stage has facilitated a move into other television and film roles. In 2006, he played the leading role in the one-off drama thriller The Outsiders, co-starring actors Colin Salmon and Brian Cox. Later that year, he made a brief appearance in the Hollywood film Blood Diamond.

In 2007 and 2008, he made guest appearances in the Channel 4 series Comedy Showcase and City of Vice, as well as an episode of the BBC drama series Lark Rise to Candleford. He also achieved his first major film role (as singer Jess Conrad) in Telstar.

In 2009 he appeared in the series Plus One, and took over from Max Beesley as the new male lead in the BBC drama Hotel Babylon playing new owner Sam Franklin. He also appeared as a "Dealer" in the Channel 4 online educational game The Curfew.

In 2011, Harman appeared in an episode of Agatha Christie's Marple. In 2013, he appeared in the fourth series of Downton Abbey, playing the role of a visiting valet and serial rapist named Mr Green. From 2013 until the series ended in 2017, he played Bradley Dawson in Mount Pleasant.

The BBC announced in February 2023 that Harman had joined the cast of Casualty as Dr Max Cristie, the new clinical lead of the emergency department. Harman made his debut that same month.

In August 2023, it was announced that Harman would appear as a contestant on the twenty-first series of Strictly Come Dancing. He was partnered with Katya Jones. He had to step down from the competition due to an injury hours before the quarter final on 2 December 2023.

== Personal life ==
Harman married actress Lucy Liemann in 2011. The couple have a daughter.

== Filmography ==
=== Film ===
Year	Title	Role	Notes
2006	Blood Diamond	News Reporter #1	
2008	R.I.P. TV	Jake	Short
2008	Telstar	Jess Conrad	

=== Television ===
Year	Title	Role	Notes
1984	Tenko	Timmy	1 episode
1986	Alas Smith and Jones	Uncredited	3 episodes
1987	The Honey Siege	George Green	7 episodes
1987	The Home-Made Xmas Video	Peter	
1991	The Bill	Macfee	Episode: "The Juggler and the Fortune Teller"
2002	Coupling	Pizza Man	Episode: "The Girl with One Heart"
2003	Red Cap	Dan Coulthard	Episode: "Crush"
2003	Doctors	Mike Summers	Episode: "Black and Blue"
2003–2005	EastEnders	Dennis Rickman	Regular role; 321 episodes
2006	The Outsiders	Nathan Hyde	
2007	Comedy Showcase	Rich Black	Episode: "Plus One"
2008	City of Vice	Thomas Deacon	1 episode
2008	Lark Rise to Candleford	Samuel Braby	1 episode
2009	The Friday Night Club	Ted	
2009	Plus One	Rich Black	Main role
2009	Hotel Babylon	Sam Franklin	Main role
2011	Agatha Christie's Marple	Jason Rudd	Episode: "The Mirror Crack'd from Side to Side"
2013	Downton Abbey	Green	Recurring role (series 4)
2013–2017	Mount Pleasant	Bradley	Main role
2018	Cuckoo	Lloyd	Episode: "Ken's New Friend"
2020	We Hunt Together	Simon Goodbridge	1 episode
2022	Tell Me Everything	Gareth	Recurring role
2023–2024	Casualty	Max Cristie	Main role
2023	Strictly Come Dancing	Himself	Contestant; Series 21
2026	The Marlow Murder Club	Marcus	Episodes: "The Queen of Poisons Parts 1 and 2"

== Awards and nominations ==
Year	Award	Category	Work	Result	Ref.
2003	9th National Television Awards	Most Popular Newcomer	EastEnders	Won	
2004	British Soap Awards	Best Newcomer	EastEnders	Won	
2004	British Soap Awards	Sexiest Male	EastEnders	Won	
2004	Inside Soap Awards	Best Actor	EastEnders	Won	
2004	Inside Soap Awards	Sexiest Male	EastEnders	Won	
2004	10th National Television Awards	Most Popular Actor	EastEnders	Nominated	
2005	British Soap Awards	Best Actor	EastEnders	Nominated	
2005	British Soap Awards	Sexiest Male	EastEnders	Won	
2005	Inside Soap Awards	Best Couple (shared with Letitia Dean)	EastEnders	Nominated	
2005	Inside Soap Awards	Best Actor	EastEnders	Won	
2005	Inside Soap Awards	Sexiest Male	EastEnders	Won	
2005	11th National Television Awards	Most Popular Actor	EastEnders	Nominated	
2006	British Soap Awards	Sexiest Male	EastEnders	Nominated	
2023	Inside Soap Awards	Best Drama Star	Casualty	Won	
