= Billings Studio Theater =

Coordinates: 45°47′55″N 108°33′14″W

Billings Studio Theatre is a not-for-profit community theatre company located at 1500 Rimrock Road in Billings, Montana.

The first performance by the company was There's Always Juliet in 1953. In 1963, the company decided it needed a home and moved into a church in downtown Billings. Five years later, the church became condemned and effort to build a new home began. In 1971, Billings Studio Theatre opened its doors to a new theatre located in the now central part of Billings located next to the Rocky Mountain College campus. Billings Studio Theatre is NOT operated by RMC but is a 501 (c)(3) stand alone nonprofit organization. .

Currently, the company produces four plays and four musicals each year in addition to an age restricted children's production. Some more recent productions have included The Descendants, Beauty and the Beast, Frozen , ELF, Shrek, and Murder on the Orient Express.

In 2013, BST became the first community theater company in Montana to stage a "full version of the musical "Les Misérables"."

About 500 people a year volunteer at the theater. BST presents 8 Main Stage productions. Additional shows presented at the BST include one or two Rocky Mountain College productions annually. BST also "operates a children's theatre, The Growing Stage."
