= Studio (disambiguation) =

A studio is an artist's or worker's work room.

Studio or The Studio may also refer to:

== Buildings and spaces ==
- Dock10 (television facility) in Manchester, England also known as The Studios
- Film studio
- Photographic studio
- Recording studio (or Radio studio)
- Studio apartment, a style of apartment
- Television studio
- The Studio, a theatre space in Holden Street Theatres, Adelaide, Australia
- The Studio, a theatre space within the former Metro Arts Centre, Brisbane, Australia
- The Studio, intimate performance space in the Sydney Opera House

== Computing, video and technology ==
- 3D Studio Max, a mesh-animation tool
- Android Studio, an IDE for Android
- GameMaker: Studio, a proprietary game-development tool
- Okam Studio, the videogame developers who wrote the Godot game engine
- Studio editions: different editions of computer products such as:
  - JDeveloper Studio Edition, an IDE provided by Oracle Corporation
  - My Passport: Studio Edition
  - HardSID 4U Studio Edition
- Visual Studio, an IDE by Microsoft
- Xamarin Studio, IDE for Monodevelop

== Music ==
- Studio (band), a Swedish band
- Studio (Tages album), an album by Tages
- "Studio" (song), a song by Schoolboy Q

== Other uses ==
- The Studio (commune), New York artists commune
- The Studio (magazine), British magazine of arts and culture, published from 1893 until 1964
- The Studio (TV channel), former TV channel in the UK and Ireland that aired films
- The Studio (TV series), American comedy series
