= Robert Daws =

British actor

- Born: 4 May 1959 (age 67); Leigh-on-Sea, Essex, England
- Occupations: Actor, author
- Years active: 1980–present
- Spouse: Amy Robbins (m. 2003)
- Children: 3

Robert Daws (born 4 May 1959) is an English actor, and crime fiction author. He is best known for his television roles, including Tuppy Glossop in Jeeves and Wooster (1990–1993), gruff cricketer Roger Dervish in the comedy Outside Edge (1994–1996), mini-cab firm owner Sam in the sitcom Roger Roger (1996–2003), and East Yorkshire GP Dr Gordon Ormerod in the period medical drama The Royal (2003–2011).

== Acting career ==
Daws was trained at RADA. Daws appeared in the 1982 stage play On Your Way, Riley! with Brian Murphy and Maureen Lipman. He played Tuppy Glossop in the early 1990s ITV version of Jeeves and Wooster. He played pompous cricket captain Roger Dervish alongside Brenda Blethyn in the award-winning ITV comedy-drama Outside Edge 1994–96, for which he was nominated for Best Comedy Actor at the British Comedy Awards.

Daws has also appeared in a number of one-off dramas including the 1997 BBC drama, The Missing Postman, Sword of Honour (Channel 4), Take a Girl Like You (BBC), Mystery of Men (BBC) and in 1996 he starred in a pilot of what would become the long-running series Roger Roger, a comedy-drama which ran until 2003. Daws starred as Sam Mountjoy, the co-owner of Cresta Cabs. Daws also appeared as Ernie Rayner in the three-part prequel to Only Fools and Horses, Rock and Chips (BBC).

He played Mike Spicer in Midsomer Murders "Hidden Depths" (2005), and Hamish Rafferty in "The Curse of the Ninth" (2017).

Daws plays the trumpet, as evidenced when in 1994 he appeared as a guest in the final episode of the BBC comedy series A Bit of Fry and Laurie (series four) and played over the credits, accompanied by Hugh Laurie on the piano.

Daws appeared as Dr. Gordon Ormerod in the long-running ITV drama series The Royal, the last scenes of which showed Ormerod fighting for his life after an attack at the hospital.

Robert Daws played a recurring role in Robin of Sherwood as King John's herald, Hubert de Guiscarde in the episodes "The Greatest Enemy" and "The Sheriff of Nottingham".

In November and December 2009, he appeared in Public Property by Sam Peter Jackson at the Trafalgar Studios.

In May and June 2010, he appeared in Coronation Street as Gail McIntyre's barrister as part of her murder trial storyline where she was wrongly accused of murdering husband Joe McIntyre.

From July 2010 to 11 September 2010, Daws appeared as Dr Watson in The Secret of Sherlock Holmes at the Duchess Theatre. In this production, Sherlock Holmes was played by Peter Egan. Daws also appeared as Jim Hacker in the West End production of Yes, Prime Minister and the national tour of Blackbird by David Harrower, for which he was nominated for Best Actor in the Manchester Evening News Drama Awards. He also appeared in the first Classic Comedy Company productions of Ten Times Table and How the Other Half Loves, by Alan Aykbourn. Also, Michael Frayn's Alarms and Excursions.

He appeared as Charles Pooter in a new adaptation of Diary of a Nobody and as John Carlisle, in an episode of New Tricks (Series 8, episode 9) which was first shown on BBC1 on 29 August 2011. He played Gavin Dibbs the husband of the new GP in Port Wenn in an episode of Doc Martin (Series 5, episode 1) first shown on ITV on 12 September 2011.

He played appeared as the father in Jack Whitehall's episode of the British holiday series Little Crackers, and portrays Mayor Len Winkler in Ben Elton's comedy series, The Wright Way, for BBC One.

He portrayed Arthur Lowe (June 2019) on BBC Radio 4, in Dear Arthur, Love John and Ronnie Barker in Goodnight from Him and John Betjeman in New Fame. New Love (BBC Radio 4). He also co-created the BBC Radio detective series Trueman and Riley and played Trueman in all three series.

In 2014, he began filming Poldark as Dr Thomas Choake. (BBC 2015–2019)

In 2016, he appeared in the BBC TV series Father Brown as Robert Twyman, and as John Green in Death in Paradise. He also starred as Professor James Cheeseman in the horror movie The Unfolding. He also appeared in Agatha Raisin "Love from Hell" as Ted Huxley (2019). Also as psychotic drug baron Shank, in Sky's black comedy series, Sick Note (2019)

In 2022-2023, he appeared in 7 episodes of the BBC series Sister Boniface Mysteries as Chief Constable Hector Lowsley. He starred as Peter Weiss in the 2023 film The Piper.

In 2025 he played Winston Churchill in Outrageous (TV series) , a TV biopic on the Mitford family.

== Literary career ==
Daws worked with best-selling mystery writer Adam Croft on a radio-play adaptation of Croft's 2011 book, Exit Stage Left, which was released in 2012 with Daws playing the lead character Kempston Hardwick. Daws and Croft present the crime fiction podcast 'Partners In Crime'.

Daws' first crime novella, The Rock, was published in July 2012. This was followed in September 2016 with a sequel, The Poisoned Rock. A third volume of the series, The Killing Rock, was published in 2020.

== Personal life ==
Daws was born in Leigh-on-Sea, Essex.

Since February 2003 he has been married to Amy Robbins (his co-star in The Royal, who played Dr. Jill Weatherill, who later became his screen wife). They have two daughters, Elizabeth and May, and a son, Benjamin. They live in Ampthill, Bedfordshire, where Robert compered the town's first Proms in June 2009 and helped to set up the Ampthill Literary Festival.

== Filmography ==
=== Film ===
Year	Title	Role	Notes
2001	Trumps	Robert	Short film
2001	Arthur's Dyke	Arthur	
2006	Land of the Blind	Jones	
2016	The Unfolding	Professor Chessman	
2017	Amazon Adventure	Charles Darwin	
2017	An Unkind Word	Tom Spurlock	Short film
2018	Swimming with Men	Michael Blore	
2019	Car Keys	Keith	Short film
2023	The Piper	Peter Weiss	
TBA	The Chelsea Cowboy	Tony Block	

=== Television ===
Year	Title	Role	Notes
1980	The Squad	Mike Jenkins	2 episodes
1985	There Comes a Time	Peter James	7 episodes
1985	Fresh Fields	Barman	Episode: "Alarums and Excursions"
1985	John and Yoko: A Love Story	John Dunbar	Television film
1985–1986	Robin of Sherwood	Hubert de Giscard	2 episodes
1986	Unnatural Causes	Vicar	Episode: "Partners"
1988	Screen Two	Adrian Vowchurch	Episode: "Dead Lucky"
1988	The Great Escape II: The Untold Story	Kidder	Television film
1988	Game, Set, and Match	Academic	Episode: "London Match: Part 2"
1988	The Dirty Dozen	Mitchell	Episode: "Don Danko"
1989	A Woman of Substance	Roger	Episode: "The Contract"
1989	London's Burning	Dave	Episode: 2.8
1990–1993	Jeeves and Wooster	Tuppy Glossop	8 episodes
1990	Chain	Police Sergeant in Court	Episode: "Vicky Elliott"
1991	The House of Eliott	Piggy Garstone	4 episodes
1991	Birds of a Feather	Mark	Episode: "Schooling"
1992–1993, 2012	Casualty	Simon Eastman/Hugh Blakeley	12 episodes
1993	Lovejoy	Stevens	Episode: "The Colour of Mary"
1993	Paul Merton: The Series	Jacket Owner/Gerald/Submarine Captain	2 episodes
1994–1996	Outside Edge	Roger Dervish	22 episodes, nominated for British Comedy Award for Best Actor in 1995
1994	Woof!	Mr. Farthington	Episode: "Goodbye Mrs. Chips"
1995	The Bill	Michael Swift	Episode: "Is That the Time?"
1995	A Bit of Fry and Laurie	Self	Episode: 4.7
1996, 1998–2003	Roger Roger	Sam	17 episodes
1997	Embassy	Peter Nevin	Television film
1997	The Missing Postman	Peter Robson	Television film
1997	Pie in the Sky	Carver	Episode: "Squashed Tomatoes"
1997	Out of Sight	Mr. Pincher	Episode: "Little Tommy Dawkins"
1999	The Mystery of Men	Oscar Mansfield	Television film
2000, 2003	Heartbeat	Anthony Mottram/Dr. Gordon Omerod	2 episodes
2000	Take a Girl Like You	Dick Thompson	3 episodes
2001	Sword of Honour	Major Hound	Television film
2001	Office Gossip	Rod Battle	6 episodes
2003–2011	The Royal	Dr. Gordon Omerod	87 episodes
2005, 2017	Midsomer Murders	Hamish Rafferty/Mike Spicer	2 episodes
2007	You Can Choose Your Friends	Simon Snell	Television film
2007	The Marchioness Disaster	Cannon John Jeffrey	Television film
2010	Coronation Street	Tom Hughes	7 episodes
2010	The Slammer	Detective Ron Zef	Episode: "Laughing on the Inside"
2010-2011	Rock & Chips	Ernie Rayner	3 episodes
2011	New Tricks	John Carlisle	Episode: "Half Life"
2011	Doc Martin	Gavin Dibbs	Episode: "Preserve the Romance"
2011	Little Crackers	Michael	Episode: "Jack Whitehall's Little Cracker: Daddy's Little Princess"
2013	The Wright Way	Mayor Len Winkler	4 episodes
2014	Holby City	Will Tudor-Bass	Episode: "Self Control"
2015–2018	Poldark	Dr. Choake	9 episodes
2016	Father Brown	Robert Twyman	Episode: "The Sins of the Father"
2016	Death in Paradise	John Green/Marcus Knight	Episode: "Lost in Identity"
2018	Sick Note	Shank	3 episodes
2020	Agatha Raisin	Ted Huxley	Episode: "Love from Hell"
2022–present	Sister Boniface Mysteries	Chief Constable Hector Lowsley	6 episodes
2022	The Man Who Fell to Earth	Wyant Bridge	Episode: "New Angels of Promise"
2025	Outrageous (TV series)	Winston Churchill	2 Episodes

=== Select stage credits ===
Year	Title	Role	Notes
2001-2002	Caught in the Net	John Smith	
2006	Summoned by Betjeman	John Betjeman	
2008	Blackbird	Ray	
2009	Public Property	Geoff	
2010	The Secret of Sherlock Holmes	Dr. Watson	Replaced Philip Franks
2011	The Diary of a Nobody	Pooter	
2012	Yes, Prime Minister	Jim Hacker	
2014	The Perfect Murder	Victor Smiley	Written by Peter James
2017	How the Other Half Loves	Frank Foster	
2019-2020	Ten Times Table	Ray	
2021	The Cherry Orchard	Pishchik	

=== Select audio credits ===
Year	Title	Role	Notes
2002-2012	Trueman and Riley	Detective Inspector Trueman	BBC Radio 4/BBC Radio 7
2012	Dear Arthur, Love John	Arthur Lowe	BBC Radio 4
2013	Goodnight from Him	Ronnie Barker	BBC Radio 4
2013	Sword of Honour	Arthur Box-Bender	BBC Radio 4
2017	Torchwood One: Before the Fall: Through the Ruins	Soren/Lord Jacobin	Big Finish
2017	The Erpingham Camp	Erpingham	BBC Radio 3
2017	The War Master: Only the Good: The Sky Man	Anvar	Big Finish
2018	Doctor Who: The Early Adventures: The Dalek Occupation of Winter	Gaius Majorian	Big Finish
2021	Doctor Who: The Third Doctor Adventures: The Devil's Hoofprints	Sir Basil Hexworthy	Big Finish
2024	Doctor Who: The Twelfth Doctor Adventures: Sunstrike	The Quartermaster / Howard	Big Finish

== Bibliography ==
- The Rock (2012)
- The Poisoned Rock (2016)
- The Killing Rock (2020)
