= Gary Martin (actor) =

British actor

- Occupation: Actor
- Years active: 1980–present
- Website: https://garymartin.co.uk/

Gary Martin is a British actor. He is best known for voicing Sugar Puffs' mascot Honey Monster, many characters in animated The Beano projects and Beast Man in the 2026 Masters of the Universe film.

== Career ==
Martin's father was a singer, and his mother was an actor and extra. In 1975, he had acted in a few adverts by the end of school, but needed to get a proper job. He got a cabaret act together and started performing on a cruise ship at 17. In 1976, he made his debut in the West End theatre with Jesus Christ Superstar at 18 after a period of training at the London Academy of Music and Dramatic Art.

He later moved on to other theatre roles in the West End, such as Rocky Horror in The Rocky Horror Show in 1979, the voice of Audrey II in Little Shop of Horrors in 1983, which he described as a "deep, black, Harlem voice"; Time in 1986, Munkustrap in Cats from 1987 to 1990, Miss Saigon in 1989, Joseph and the Amazing Technicolor Dreamcoat in 1990, and Vince Fontaine in Grease in 1993. In 1980, he narrated a trailer for Saturn 3. Martin had been doing jingles and adverts, but started doing voice acting, including providing the voice of Sugar Puffs' mascot Honey Monster from the 1980s onwards. In the 1990s, he shifted to focus more on voice acting.

Martin has provided voices for The Adventures of Mole, The Adventures of Toad, The NeverEnding Story III, FernGully 2: The Magical Rescue, Corpse Bride, Ultramarines: A Warhammer 40,000 Movie and Minions. He won a Talkie Award for his portrayal of Judge Dredd for BBC Radio 1. He has also recorded voiceovers for American and British commercials and film trailers.

== Filmography ==
=== Animation ===
- The Dreamstone (1990–1995) – Zordrak, Narrator (seasons 2–4)
- The Legends of Treasure Island (1993–1995) – Merman Prince, additional voices
- The Beano Video (1993) – Gnasher, Gnipper, Rasher, Talent Contest Host, Customer, Mother Bird, Tailcoat #1, Spotty (Face the Music)
- Budgie the Little Helicopter (1994–1995) – Smashit the Bulldozer, additional voices
- Molly's Gang (1994) – Homer, Duster, Hubble
- The Beano Videostars (1994) – Gnasher, Gnipper, Rasher, Park Keeper #1, Birds, Cats, Fatty Fudge, Park Keeper #2, Plumber, Fatty, Plug, Spotty, Wilfrid, 'Erbert, Janitor, Woodworm, Uncle Mike, Billy Whizz, Pedestrian #1, Pedestrian #3, Poolgoer #1, Poolgoer #4, Ivy's Toys, Party Sounds from Beano Town Narrator
- Vincent and Doug (1994–2003) – James Monroe
- The Snow Queen (1995) – Dimly
- The Adventures of Mole (1995) – Otter, additional voices
- Dennis and Gnasher (1996–1998) – Kevin Pie-Face, Mr. Pie-Face, Walter's Dad, Derek Cool, various characters
- Bimble's Bucket (1996) – Sploot
- The Adventures of Toad (1996) – Additional voices
- The Snow Queen's Revenge (1996) – Dimly
- The Adventures of Dawdle the Donkey (1996–1998) – Narrator
- Captain Star (1997–1998) – Navigator Black (four episodes), Captain Bloater, Jasper Quilt, additional voices
- The Ugly Duckling (1997) – Jack Frost, The Winds of Winter
- FernGully 2: The Magical Rescue (1998) – Mac, Goanna
- Jack and the Beanstalk (1999) – Dark Riders
- The Baskervilles (2000) – Darren Baskerville, Colin, The Boss, various characters
- The Magic Key (2000–2001) – Mr. Robinson
- MacDonald's Farm (2000–2001) – Neigh Neigh
- Captain Scarlet and the Return of the Mysterons (2000) – Captain Black, Mysterons
- Dog and Duck (2000–2003) – Piano
- Spheriks (2002) – Ato
- Oswald (2001–2003) – Egbert, Steve Tree, Pongo, Head Gingerbread Man, Reporter, Freddy the Teddy Bear, Show Announcer, Stagehand, Gingerbread Man 2, Gingerbread Man 4, additional voices (UK dub)
- Mr. Bean: The Animated Series (2002–2026) – Harry, Mr. Bruiser, Dr. Daze, Usher, Announcer, Men in Theatre, Vet, Man with Dog, Actor, additional voices
- Busy Buses (2002–2003) – Narrator, Tommy, additional voices (season 2)
- The Story Makers (2002–2004) – Narrator, additional voices (Super Baby)
- Bounty Hamster (2003) – Memory Man, additional voices
- Yoko! Jakamoko! Toto! (2003–2005) – Jakamoko
- The Blobheads (2003–2005) – Derek the Alien
- The Tale of Jack Frost (2004) – Woodland Creatures, Goblins
- Franny's Feet (2004) – Additional voices (UK dub)
- Kaena: The Prophecy (2004) – The Priest (English dub)
- Hero's Delight: The Movie (2004) – James Monroe
- Legend of the Dragon (2005–2008) – Zodiac Master, Emperor of the Darkest Yin, additional voices
- BB3B (2005) – Dad (Simon), Announcer
- Corpse Bride (2005) – General Wellington, Fat Chef, Skeletons, Harmonies
- Flash Harry (2005) – Flash Harry
- The Jungle Book: Rikki-Tikki-Tavi to the Rescue (BKN Classic Series) (2006) – Various characters
- Angelina Ballerina: Angelina Sets Sail (2006) – Captain
- The Likeaballs (2006) – Dan, Invinciball, Destructiball
- Alice in Wonderland: What's the Matter with Hatter? (BKN Classic Series) (2007) – Various characters
- The Prince and the Pauper: Double Trouble (BKN Classic Series) (2007) – Various characters
- The Three Musketeers: Saving the Crown (BKN Classic Series) (2007) – Various characters
- Quest for a Heart (2007) – Sage of the Sauna (English dub)
- Dork Hunters from Outer Space (2008–2009) – Fido
- Robin Hood: Quest for the King (BKN Classic Series) (2008) – Friar Tuck, Prince John
- Ultramarines: A Warhammer 40,000 Movie (2010) – Brother Hypax, Brother Maxillius, Brother Decius
- Sokator-442 (2011) – Damgard, Dooby, Scrink
- The Woodlies (2012) – Whitetail
- Frankenweenie (2012) – Sea-Monkeys
- Boomerang (2013–2015) – Bugs Bunny, Daffy Duck, Porky Pig, Elmer Fudd, Yosemite Sam, Narrator (Looney Tunes marathon promotions)
- Aquafresh (since 2014) – Captain Aquafresh, Narrator
- Pet Pals in Windland (2014) – Kite (English dub)
- Minions (2015) – Additional voices
- Prisoner Zero (2016) – Librarian
- Furiki Wheels (2018) – Gordon
- Aliens Love Underpants and... Panta Claus (2018) – Additional voices
- Tad, the Lost Explorer and the Emerald Tablet (2022) – Pickle (English dub)
- Blacktalon (2023–2025) – Be'lakor
- Ozi: Voice of the Forest (2023) – Security Guard #1
- Supa Team 4 (2023) – Chomps the Goat
- Captain Laserhawk: A Blood Dragon Remix (2023) – Lion Wrestler, Bill, Guard, Director Alpha, Wrench, Movie Trailer Voice, Game Announcer
- Super Happy Magic Forest (2024–2025) – Goblin King
- The Lord of the Rings: The War of the Rohirrim (2024) – Additional voices
- Jacob Grizzly (2024) – Jacob Grizzly
- Dudley & the Invasion of the Space Slugs (2027) – Morbus

=== Live action ===
- Sugar Puffs (1980–2010) – Honey Monster (voice)
- Nobody's Perfect (1980-1982) – Chauffeur
- Shock Treatment (1981) – 'Bit' Guitarist
- Little Shop of Horrors (1983) – Audrey II (voice)
- Wizbit (1986–1988) – Squidgy Bog (voice)
- Slaughter High (1986) – Joe
- Little Shop of Horrors (1986) – Audrey II (soundtrack album), Chauffeur (voice)
- Space Police (1986) – V. Lann (voice)
- Space Precinct (1994–1995) – Slomo, Officer Beezle (four episodes) (voices)
- The Adventures of Pinocchio (1996) - Giant in Theatre (voice)
- The Neverending Story III (1996) – Mr. Rockchewer, Junior Rockchewer, Unlucky, Large Head, additional characters (voices)
- Red Dwarf (1996) – Epideme
- Cute Little Buggers (2017) – Randy Rocksoff
- Hellboy (2019) – Giants (voice)
- Invasion Planet Earth (2019) – Remokon, Alien Overlord (voice)
- Over Christmas (2020) – Additional voices (English dub)
- Midnight at the Pera Palace (2022) – Naim Efendi (English dub)
- Little Lost Robot (2025) – Slomo (voice)
- Masters of the Universe (2026) – Beast Man (voice)

=== Radio ===
- Judge Dredd: The Original Adventures: Apocalypse War (1995) – Judge Dredd
- Judge Dredd: The Original Adventures: The Day The Law Died (1995) – Judge Dredd

=== Video games ===
- Conquest Earth: "First Encounter" (1997) – Humans, Jovians
- Team Apache (1998) – Various characters
- Gunlok (2000) – Various characters
- Stuntman (2002) – Various characters
- Endgame (2002) – Various characters
- Downforce (2002) – Various characters
- Micro Machines (2002) – Grizzly Beard, Frank N. Stein
- Warhammer 40,000: Fire Warrior (2002) – Space Marine
- Killzone (2004) – Helghast
- Rising Kingdoms (2005) – Various characters
- Star Wars: Empire at War (2006) – Interdictor Cruiser, TIE Mauler Commander, additional voices
- Final Fantasy XII (2006) – Judge Bergan
- Bionicle Heroes (2006) – Monster #2
- Thunderbirds (2007)
- LittleBigPlanet 2 (2011) – Batman
- Star Wars: The Old Republic (2011) – Jailer Knash, Lord Abaron, additional voices
- LittleBigPlanet PS Vita (2012) – Batman
- Ace Combat Infinity (2014) – Additional voices
- Grid Autosport (2014) – Grizzly Beard, Frank N. Stein
- Divinity: Original Sin (2014) – Various characters
- Kholat (2014) – Additional voices (English version)
- Total War: Warhammer (2016) – Grimgor Ironhide, Archaon
- Final Fantasy XII: The Zodiac Age (2017) – Judge Bergan
- Total War: Warhammer II (2017) – Grimgor Ironhide
- Lego Marvel Super Heroes 2 (2017) – Hulk, Dormammu, Surtur, Supreme Intelligence, Greenskyn Smashtroll
- Seven: The Days Long Gone (2017) – Kade
- Warhammer: Vermintide 2 (2018) – Gor, Ungor, Bestigor
- Shadows: Awakening (2018) – Graabak, Korshak, Blind Demon, Demonthrall, Langdak, Rabbath, Wanion, Sevelelech, Revenants, Shadowhands, Steel Wardens, Thole Guards
- Control (2019) – Announcer, Tempest
- Total War: Warhammer III (2022) – Grimgor Ironhide
- Elden Ring (2022) – Tarnished (Male)
- Harvestella (2022) – Various characters (English version)
- Dragon Quest Monsters: The Dark Prince (2023) – Ossie, Petrarch
- Warhammer 40,000: Space Marine 2 (2024) – Ulfar, Additional Space Marines, Battle Barge Quartermaster, Battle Barge Tech-Priests, Astra Militarum Officer, Cadian Captain, Ultramarine Sergent
- Unknown 9: Awakening (2024) – Various characters
- Final Fantasy Tactics: The Ivalice Chronicles (2024) – Asmo, Construct 7 (English version)
