= Bryan Walker =

Bryan Walker may refer to:

- Bryan Walker of Team Apache
- Bryan Walker (baseball) in 1983–84 New York Rangers season

== See also ==
- Brian Walker (disambiguation)
