= Ellie Beaven =

British actress

- Born: Ellie Beaven; 24 January 1980 (age 46); Hammersmith, London, England
- Occupation: Actress
- Years active: 1988–present
- Partner: Charlie Walker-Wise
- Children: 2

Ellie Beaven (Walker-Wise) (born 24 January 1980) is an English actress.

== Early life and education ==
Beaven was born Ellen Patricia Beaven in Hammersmith, Greater London on 24 January 1980. Her mother Jennifer was born in India, which Beaven revealed in a newspaper interview while working on the TV series Down to Earth in 2001. She was educated at St Mary's R.C. Primary School in Isleworth, before then being educated at Gumley House Convent School, Isleworth.

== Career ==
=== Film and television ===
Beavan's acting debut was in 1988 in the film Buster where she played the young Nicky Edwards alongside Phil Collins. Another one of her first roles included Earth Warp where she starred in all 10 episodes. In 1991, she played the role of young Ada Corishant in the TV mini-series The Mysteries of the Dark Jungle. After parts in The Laughter of God, Mole's Christmas and The Snow Queen (the latter two being shows she provided voices for), she also provided voices for two other animated series, The Dreamstone and Bimble's Bucket, in the 1990s, both of which were created by Michael Jupp. In 1995, she appeared on stage as Wendla in an RSC production of Spring Awakening, and in 1997 she appeared as Natalie Wild in the BBC series The Wild House, in which she appeared in all three series. At the same time she was starring in the ITV series Wavelength, about a children's radio station, in which she played Kyla Kane. The show ran for two series, and alongside The Wild House she became a recognizable face on television.

2000 saw Beaven take more roles in shows aimed at adults rather than children. The first one of these was that of teenage rebel Sarah Addis in the series Down to Earth. This was followed by her portrayal of Carys in Arthur's Dyke as well as small parts in Doctors (2003) and Casualty (2004). She had previously appeared in Casualty on 25 January 1997, playing the daughter of paramedic Josh Griffiths; her character died in hospital from injuries suffered in a house fire.

On 11 April 2008, she played Nikki, girlfriend to Michael, in the opening episode of the eighth series of My Family.

On 28 June 2008, Beaven made another appearance in Casualty, playing a character called Sally, the daughter and carer of a disabled woman who gets hit by a car.

In January 2010, she appeared in two episodes of BBC soap opera EastEnders in the role of Archie Mitchell's solicitor Emma West, and in Aug 2010 she played the part of Sarah Gilligan in Holby City. She can also be seen in the television advertising campaign for Zoopla.

In January 2012, she had a guest role alongside Marcus Patric in an episode of the BBC1 daytime soap Doctors before appearing in the film Les Misérables, and the ITV series Endeavour the following year. After that she focused her career on theatre for the rest of the decade, but in 2022, she appeared on TV for the first time in 9 years in an episode of BBC comedy drama This Is Going To Hurt.

=== Theatre ===
Beaven has appeared in a number of theatre productions since her debut aged 11 in the RSC production of Dr Jekyll and Mr Hyde in 1991. As a teenager she appeared as Wendla in the controversial play Spring Awakening in 1995, which was adapted by the poet Ted Hughes. Between 10 August and 2 September 2006 she played Ela Delahay in Charley's Aunt at the Oxford Playhouse, and then Cecily Cardew in Oscar Wilde's The Importance of Being Earnest at the Derby Playhouse in January 2007.

After appearing as Gerda in The Snow Queen at the Derby Playhouse in 2009, she then starred in She Stoops To Conquer at the Nottingham Playhouse in 2010. The following year saw her appear in productions such as Relatively Speaking at the Watermill Theatre from 17 February to 26 March 2011, as Hero in Much Ado About Nothing between 16 June and 2 July 2011 for the Guildford Shakespeare Company, and again for the company in The Merchant of Venice as Jessica, as well as appearing at the King's Head Theatre in the play Constance from September 2011 to make it a busy year for Beaven. In 2013 she appeared in the RSC production of Candide, the Criterion Theatre production of The 39 Steps and the J. B. Priestley play Dangerous Corner for Salisbury Playhouse. She appeared in 2015 in the acclaimed production of A Mad World, My Masters, playing Mrs Littledick, while in 2017 she appeared at the Swan Theatre for productions of Vice Versa as Voluptua between 11 May to 9 September, and in Dido, Queen of Carthage as Venus. Her most recent theatre performance has been as Lady Capulet in the production Romeo and Juliet at the Regent's Park Open Air Theatre on 24 June 2021.

== Filmography ==
=== Film ===
Year	Title	Role	Notes	Refs.
1988	Buster	Nicky Edwards		
1999	Santa's Last Christmas	Mitzi	Voice only	
2001	Arthur's Dyke	Carys		
2012	Les Misérables	Mother		

=== Television ===
Year	Title	Role	Notes	Refs.
1988	Fairy Liquid	Daughter	Television commercial	
1989	Madame Tussauds	Mary	Television commercial	
1990	Capital City	Eva	Episode: Shoes on the Wrong Feet	
1991	Screen Two	Sophie Clemant	Episode: The Laughter of God	
1992	The Old Boy Network	Jessica Birdwell	Episode: The Iceman Cometh	
1992	Screen Two	Rachel Edwardes	Episode: The Law Lord	
1992-1995	The Dreamstone	voice of Spildit		
1994	Earth Warp	Jenny Steel	Look and Read	
1994	Mole's Christmas	voices of Young Girl and Rose		
1995	The Adventures of Mole	voice of Rose		
1995	The Snow Queen	voice of Ellie		
1996	The Snow Queen's Revenge	voice of Ellie		
1996-98	Bimble's Bucket	voice of Teeny Weeny	three series	
1997	Casualty	Sarah Griffiths	Episode: Treasure	
1997	Wavelength	Kyla Kane		
1997	To Me... To You...	herself	Series 2 episode 8	
1997–1999	The Wild House	Natalie Wild		
1997–1999	The Forgotten Toys	Sue	The Tree	
1999	Chucklevision	herself	Comic Relief Special	
2000–2003	Down to Earth	Sarah Addis	Main role, 14 episodes	
2001	Little Ghosts	voice of Lucy	13 episodes	
2003	Doctors	Lara Stewart	Episode: More than a Job	
2004	Casualty	Natalie Jones	Episode: Taking Care	
2005	Popetown	schoolgirl	regular character (uncredited), 10 episodes	
2008	My Family	Nikki	Episode: The Parent Trap	
2008	Casualty	Sally Toner	Episode They May Not Mean to But They Do	
2010	Holby City	Sarah Gilligan	Episode: Man with No Name	
2010	EastEnders	Emma West	(14 & 15 January 2010)	
2012	Doctors	Marissa Green	Episode: To Have and To Hold	
2013	Endeavour	Marigold Proctor	Episode: Rocket	
2022	This Is Going to Hurt	Anna	Series 1, Episode 3	
