= Mystic Meg =

British astrologer (1942–2023)

- Born: Margaret Anne Lake; 27 July 1942; Accrington, Lancashire, England
- Died: 9 March 2023 (aged 80); Paddington, London, England
- Education: University of Leeds
- Occupations: Newspaper and television astrologer, racehorse owner, and breeder
- Website: mysticmeg.com

Margaret Anne Lake (27 July 1942 – 9 March 2023), best known by her stage name Mystic Meg, was an English astrologer who had a regular astrology column in The Sun and the News of the World.

She also hosted Mystic Meg's Wheel of Destiny for Sun Bingo.

She came to greater public attention when she hosted what became a regular item on the first broadcast of the National Lottery draw in 1994. Her image also appears on various astrology-related books, posters and merchandise.

== Early life and education ==
Mystic Meg was born Margaret Anne Lake on 27 July 1942, in Accrington, Lancashire, to Bill Lake, an RAF aircrewman, and his wife Millicent (née Howard). Of Romani heritage, she grew up in Accrington and was taught astrology by her grandmother. Her mother formed a new relationship before her father's demobilisation in 1946, and the marriage ended. Meg never saw her father after her parents parted.

Meg studied English at the University of Leeds, and then became a sub-editor at the News of the World, rising to become deputy editor of its weekend colour supplement Sunday. In the 1980s, she became the paper's regular astrologer.

== Career ==
From 1994 to 2000, Mystic Meg appeared weekly on The National Lottery Live in 'Mystic Meg Predicts', a 45-second reading segment, during which Meg attempted to predict facts about the future winner. Comedian Brian Conley spoofed Mystic Meg under the guise of Septic Peg, a character on The Brian Conley Show, with Meg even appearing alongside his parody. Upon her death, her agent paid tribute claiming that, in Britain, her name became synonymous with foretelling the future, to the extent that the answer "I'm not Mystic Meg" would be used by everyone from people in the street to politicians to evade questions about future events.

In April 2015, Meg became the face of bookmaker Gala Coral Group's Grand National "You're Guaranteed a Fortune" marketing campaign. Images of Meg and her crystal ball featured in all of Coral's 1,850 shops via window posters and Coral TV.

Meg owned a number of racehorses under the company name Mystic Meg Limited, based in Bedford. The horses include Astrodonna, Astroangel and Astronova, and other horses with celestial names. Her horses were trained by Mark Tompkins from the mid-1990s until 2019 and then by James Eustace. The most successful horse she owned was Astrocharm, which won the Lillie Langtry Stakes at Goodwood in 2004. She also bred racehorses.

In 2015, Meg launched a website featuring horoscopes, personalised readings, and a telephone hotline hosted by psychics. She left The Sun on 2 January 2015.

== Personal life and death ==
Meg lived in Notting Hill with her seven cats. She died from influenza on 9 March 2023 at St Mary's Hospital in Paddington, London, aged 80.
