= Maggie and Her =

Television series (1978-1979)

- Maggie and Her DVD cover featuring Julia McKenzie and Irene Handl
- Created by: Leonard Webb
- Starring: Julia McKenzie; Irene Handl
- Composer: Laurie Holloway
- Country of origin: United Kingdom
- Original language: English
- No. of series: 2
- No. of episodes: 14 (including pilot)

Production
- Running time: 25 minutes
- Production company: London Weekend Television

Original release
- Network: ITV
- Release: 13 January 1978 – 27 May 1979

Maggie and Her is a British sitcom starring Julia McKenzie and Irene Handl that ran from 1978-79 (though an earlier pilot episode was made and shown in 1976). Made by London Weekend Television for ITV, the series is about a divorced school teacher (played by McKenzie) and her elderly neighbour (Handl).

== Premise ==
Maggie Brooks is a 35-year-old divorced school teacher who lives in a block of flats in London. Her next door neighbour Mrs. Perry (known to Maggie as Mrs P.), is an eccentric, malapropism-prone elderly woman who takes it upon herself to interfere in Maggie's life as much as possible. Though they are not related, the pair of them have a classic mother/daughter relationship with Mrs P. regularly knocking on Maggie's front door to voice her opinions on a variety of things (including the men in Maggie's life). Some of the other residents of their building were occasionally seen played by Anna Wing Sylvia Coleridge, and Maggie's professional life as a teacher in an inner city London comprehensive school was also shown, Carol Gillies was The Headmistress and Maggie Foot the P.E Teacher. In series two Carmen Silvera was the new Headmistress.

== Series history ==
The first series of Maggie and Her began transmission in January 1978, though an earlier pilot episode of the series (entitled Poppy and Her) with McKenzie and Handl in the same roles was screened on ITV in 1976. The premise and setting of the earlier pilot episode was virtually the same, with the only tangible difference being that McKenzie's character was called Poppy instead of Maggie.

McKenzie also performed the series theme tune, composed by Laurie Holloway.

== Home media ==
Both series of Maggie and Her have been released on Region 2 (UK) DVD by Network in 2011 and 2012 respectively. The first series also includes the original Poppy and Her pilot episode as a bonus feature.
