= The Brian Conley Show =

UK TV comedy show

- Genre: Comedy
- Presented by: Brian Conley
- Starring: Fern Britton (1992–93); John Sachs (1993–95); Ray Tizzard (1994–95)
- Country of origin: United Kingdom
- Original language: English
- No. of series: 7
- No. of episodes: 53

Production
- Production locations: Churchill Theatre (1992–93); The London Studios (1994–95)
- Running time: 30 minutes (1992–93); 45 minutes (1994–95); 60 minutes (2000–02)
- Production companies: LWT (1992–95); Thames Television (2000–02)

Original release
- Network: ITV
- Release: 22 February 1992 – 3 August 2002

Related
- Brian Conley: Alive and Dangerous; Brian Conley's Crazy Christmas

The Brian Conley Show is a comedy variety show, and later a comedy chat show, fronted by comedian Brian Conley. Seven series were broadcast in the United Kingdom on ITV between 1992 and 1995, and then 2000 and 2002.

== Synopsis ==
The show was commissioned following Conley's last successful comedy series, Brian Conley: This Way Up. It was a mix of comedy, music, sketches, and variety acts. The first two series were recorded in the Churchill Theatre in Bromley rather than a television studio, giving the show a "live" feel. Conley would perform musical numbers, stand-up routines and sketches, the latter of which were performed on sets that were wheeled out onto the stage, and he'd often change costume in front of the audience. Series three and four were filmed in The London Studios and given a new look. Sketches were now performed on a rotating platform that switched between different sets as it spun. However, Conley's trademark characters were either performed on their own set or were pre-recorded.

Conley decided that the fourth series would be the last when, in an interview with TV Times, he decided to pursue a career on stage. However, after Conley compered the Royal Variety Performance in 1999, the show returned in 2000 albeit in a chat show format, dramatically different to the original show. Whilst it retained Conely's stand-up sets at the beginning of the show, as well as his special guests, sketches and Conley's characters were removed from the show. Whilst this had some fans unhappy, the show managed to pull in some famous guests including Leslie Nielsen and Kathleen Turner. The revival lasted for three series. Series 6 was broadcast on Friday nights, returning to Saturdays for the 7th and final series.

Repeats began to show a few years later on the now defunct Granada Plus, though episodes stopped showing on the channel a few years before it closed, and wasn't broadcast again until Rewind TV started showing it again in January 2026.

== Features ==
=== Sketch characters ===
With the exception of Septic Peg, some of Conley's characters were revived from This Way Up. They were all dropped after the original series run and didn't return for the revival in 2000.

==== Nick Frisbee and Larry the Loafer ====
Nick Frisbee was a children's in-vision continuity presenter who had a squirrel puppet sidekick, Larry the Loafer (operated by Ray Tizzard). The premise of the character was to mock children's television presenters at the time, many who had puppet sidekicks – Larry was loosely based, and named after, BBC Saturday morning show Going Live's puppet Gordon the Gopher and had a similar voice as Sooty & Co's Sweep. Unlike children's television presenters, Nick was crude, and often cared very little for Larry or his viewers. He'd famously treat Larry very harshly, often hitting him with a club, which prompted the audience to 'aww,' to which Nick would reiterate to the audience that "it's a puppet!" Nick would read out letters, poems and jokes "sent in" by viewers with double-entendre names, and show spoof trailers for movies. In the last episode, Larry gets his revenge on Nick by dropping a studio light on him when he appeals for the welfare of loafers.

==== "Dangerous Brian" Conley ====
"Dangerous Brian" Conley was Conley's alter-ego stuntman. He would perform stunts that would often vary in danger and ludicrousness, which he'd often not perform. Stunts varied from bungee jumps to riding pizza delivery scooters. From the second series, he was accompanied by commentator John Sachs who would often make fun of Dangerous much to his despair. He was occasionally joined by his scrawny helper, Nearly Dangerous Norris (played by Ray Tizzard) who dressed in a pink costume and often had no idea what he was doing.

==== Septic Peg ====
Introduced in series four, Septic Peg was an astrologist who featured in sketches entitled Septic Peg Predicts. She was a direct parody of Mystic Meg who appeared on the then newly devised National Lottery draws that aired on BBC 1 around the same time as The Brian Conley Show. Like Mystic Meg, Septic Peg would make predictions with the help of her crystal ball, but were often blatantly obvious predictions, such as guessing the Lottery winner would be celebrating a birthday this year, their name would begin with a letter of the alphabet, and they will be either a man or a woman, (or, in one episode, Russell Grant). Her predictions were often accompanied with funny looks to camera, including crossed-eyes and pursed lips. Mystic Meg would appear as herself alongside her "beautiful sister" in Conley's 1996 special Alive and Dangerous.

=== Conley's Car Boot Quiz ===
Only featuring in the third series, Conley's Car Boot Quiz was a game played by two members of the public in a bid to win £1,000. Conley would be filmed on location asking various people if they wanted to play, and mostly involved people not knowing who he was or what he was talking about. When two people were eventually chosen, they were given various impressions to identify which were performed by Jake, a robot from the year 3003 and was able to perform thousands of voices. After Jake performed the impression, the contestants would have to look through a car boot to find an item relating to the person Jake impersonated. The first person to return with the correct prop, Conley would give trivia about the person to the contestant, and had to say whether the trivia was a Fact (True) or a Fib (False). Guessing correctly won them £50. After four impressions, the winner with the most money would move on to the final round, which was based on word association. Conley would name a celebrity, such as Frank Bruno, and the contestant would have to think of words associated to that celebrity, such as boxing. Conley would often give clues if the contestant was stuck or simply show them the answer on his card. For every correct answer, the contestant won £100.

=== Music ===
Music featured heavily during the show's original run. Conley opened with his own adaptation of a song and closed with one other and a dance number with a band and dancers. Each show also had a musical guest that'd perform after the commercial break.

=== Speciality acts ===
One of the show's stand-out features was its showcase of variety acts. Many of these guests were magicians, although some were out of the ordinary. Notable guests include Octopus (which was essentially a human slinky), Christopher Hart, who played Thing from The Addams Family movies, and a man whose costume played musical notes and drum beats. This feature was retained in the 2000 revival, and had guests such as a "boneless" man, a supposedly juggling fly, and a scientist who had Conley lay down on a bed of nails and had a concrete block smashed on his stomach.

== Transmissions ==
Series	Start date	End date	Episodes
1	22 February 1992	28 March 1992	5
2	15 May 1993	26 June 1993	6
3	7 May 1994	18 June 1994	7
4	3 June 1995	22 July 1995	8
5	18 March 2000	6 May 2000	8
6	30 March 2001	18 May 2001	8
7	1 June 2002	3 August 2002	10

=== Specials ===
==== Brian Conley: Alive and Dangerous (1996) ====
A year after the end of The Brian Conley Show saw Alive and Dangerous, a special live show that aired on ITV on 28 September 1996. Similar to the original show, albeit performed on a stage rather than in a studio, it featured Conley's sketch characters, as well as considerably more songs and stand-up. It also featured a performance from Conley as Al Jolson. The show was released on VHS and DVD with extra material, although neither are currently in production.

==== Brian Conley's Crazy Christmas (1997) ====
Broadcast on ITV on 23 December 1997, Crazy Christmas was essentially an extended, Christmas special of The Brian Conley Show, but featured more sketches less reliant on his characters, similar to This Way Up.

== Reception ==
In 10 Years of Telly Addicts (1994), Richard Lewis wrote that The Brian Conley Show had been "welcomed by traditionalists", suggesting that "Perhaps this was the show that would lead television light entertainment back to good old variety'. Stay tuned..."
