= Mole's Christmas =

1994 British TV special or programme

- The VHS cover
- Genre: TV Special
- Based on: The Wind in the Willows by Kenneth Grahame
- Screenplay by: Marion Edwards; Sue Radley
- Directed by: Martin Gates
- Voices of: Richard Briers (Rat); Peter Davison (Mole); Ellie Beaven (Young Girl); Imelda Staunton (Mother)
- Theme music composer: Tony Britten
- Country of origin: United Kingdom
- Original language: English

Production
- Producer: Martin Gates
- Editors: Neville Donoghue (video); Kevin Brazier (sound)
- Running time: 30 minutes

Original release
- Network: ITV
- Release: 25 December 1994

Mole's Christmas (also known as The Wind in the Willows: Mole's Christmas) is a 30-minute animated film released in 1994. The voices involved are Richard Briers (Rat), Peter Davison (Mole) and Ellie Beaven (Young Girl) with Imelda Staunton (Mother). Directed by Martin Gates, it is based on Kenneth Grahame's 1908 novel The Wind in the Willows and is part of a series.

The film is light-hearted and aimed at a younger audience.

== Plot ==
The plot involves a tired Mole and his friend Rat trudging through the snow one Christmas Eve towards Rat's home, all the while unknowingly pursued by two inept and clumsy weasels. Suddenly, Mole smells his home and wishes that he could be there instead. Once at his home, Mole and Rat decorate it for Christmas and prepare a Christmas feast which they share with a group of poor field mice who are carolers.
