= The Snow Queen's Revenge =

- Czech home release cover art
- Directed by: Martin Gates
- Written by: Sue Radley; Martin Gates
- Produced by: Martin Gates
- Starring: Julia McKenzie; Ellie Beaven; Hugh Laurie
- Music by: Toby Allington
- Production companies: Martin Gates Productions; Carrington Productions
- Distributed by: First Independent Films
- Release date: 1996
- Running time: 65 minutes
- Country: United Kingdom
- Language: English

The Snow Queen's Revenge is a 1996 British children's animated film co-written, directed and produced by Martin Gates. It is a sequel to the 1995 film The Snow Queen that has some of the voice cast changed, including Julia McKenzie replacing Helen Mirren in the title role. Vanquished in the first film, the powerful and evil Snow Queen is resurrected and sets out to seek revenge. The young Ellie and her best friends must stop her once again.

== Plot ==
The plot is picking up where the previous film left off. With the evil Snow Queen having been defeated, Dimly the flying reindeer returns to the village with Ellie, her brother Tom, and Peeps the sparrow. By now it is almost spring.

Back at the Snow Queen's palace, her now-free three trolls, Eric, Baggy and Wardrobe, prepare for Dimly to take Freda back to the flying school and return for the trolls. As the trolls try to figure out where to go, the Queen's bats take her magic staff and place it in her hand, setting her free from her frozen form moments after Dimly returns. The revived Queen is furious and holds Ellie especially responsible for ruining her plans to rule the world, and decides to kidnap Dimly so Ellie will come to her and pay with her life. She moves with Dimly and the trolls to the South Pole, as it is now too warm in the North Pole.

The Snow Queen contacts Ellie, telling her that she has captured Dimly and daring her to rescue him. Ellie does not know where the Queen is now, so Peeps takes her to Brenda, a bird that is said to know everything. Meanwhile, at the Queen’s palace set on a frozen volcano, Elsbeth and Pearl (two humanoid penguins who serve the Queen and clean the South Pole palace) talk about the Queen, about how Elsbeth is proud to serve the Queen while Pearl laments that they never get appreciated. The Snow Queen arrives at the South Pole Palace and locks Dimly away in her stables, near her ferocious reindeers, which attempt to break into his part of the stables and eat him. Brenda takes Ellie and Peeps toward the South Pole. They stop at a restaurant for food, where the proprietor (a greedy humanoid pig) and her minions capture Brenda and try to cook her to serve as food. Ellie and Peeps stop them and escape, destroying the restaurant.

The Snow Queen begins work on the final part of her plan, creating a flying magic pterosaur she names Iceosaurus. Meanwhile, Ellie falls asleep and she and Peeps fall off Brenda and into the ocean, where they are picked up by a humanoid walrus, Clive and his wife Rowena, on a ship named the S.S. Quagmire. When Ellie and Peeps explain how they are on their way to the Snow Queen's palace, they realize that she set the whole thing up to lure Ellie there. Clive and Rowena are revealed to be bounty hunters who decide to give Ellie to the Queen for a big reward, and imprison her and Peeps. When Brenda realizes that they have fallen off, she comes back and rescues them.

Brenda, Ellie, and Peeps arrive at the South Pole, but Iceosaurus freezes Brenda. Ellie and Peeps discover a magic talisman that turns into a magic pepper pot which Ellie uses to unfreeze Brenda. Brenda separates from Ellie to find a high place to take off. Ellie and Peeps encounter Pearl and Elspeth, and Ellie traps them inside a bubble using the device when they refuse to let them in. They find Dimly and release him from the stables just in time from the reindeers by turning the device into a key, but locking the Queen's reindeers inside. The group attempts to escape, but Dimly is too weak to fly at the moment. The Queen and Iceosaurus attack them, but Freda's device turns into a kind of shield that Ellie uses to deflect the ice beams the Queen shoots at her, causing one to hit Iceosaurus. It falls and crashes into the ground, creating a massive volcanic eruption. Brenda escapes the flood of lava and gets Ellie, Peeps, and Dimly to safety. The panicked Queen attempts to flee on feet, but is unable to escape her crumbling palace and falls down into the lava.

As Brenda takes Ellie, Peeps, and Dimly back home, Eric, Baggy, Wardrobe, Pearl, and Elspeth watch as the Snow Queen's castle is destroyed, and walk off once the eruption is over. The final scene shows the Queen drifting through the river of molten magma, her body seemingly turned to stone and still holding her magic staff. Peeps narration then gave the audience the assurance that everyone and everything is okay, all the while, as at the end of the first film, her eyes glow ominously before the credits roll.

== Cast ==
- Julia McKenzie as the Snow Queen, the ruthless magical monarch of the North and South Poles; Freda, the headmistress of a flying school for reindeer; and the Proprietor, a greedy pig who runs a restaurant.
- Ellie Beaven as Ellie, a courageous and optimistic young girl with a kind heart.
- Gary Martin as Dimly, a reindeer who struggles with flying.
- Hugh Laurie as Peeps, a house sparrow and Ellie's best friend.
- Elizabeth Spriggs as Brenda, a very intelligent bird who is friends with Peeps.
- Tim Healy as Eric, the leader of the Snows Queen's unwilling troll minions.
- Colin Marsh as Baggy, a bumbling troll and Wardrobe’s best friend.
- Russell Floyd as Wardrobe, a dim-witted troll and the kindest of the three.
- Patrick Barlow as Clive, a walrus, the captain of the S.S Quagmire and the husband of Rowena.
- Imelda Staunton as Elsbeth, a kind and optimistic penguin who is proud and enjoys her job as a cleaner for the Snow Queen's new palace in the South Pole; and Rowena, an ambitious walrus and the wife of Clive.
- Alison Steadman as Pearl, a rude and abrasive penguin who clearly does not enjoy her job as a cleaner for the Snow Queen's South Pole palace.

== Production and release ==
The animation production was done overseas at Fil-Cartoons in Manila, Philippines, formerly owned by American studio Hanna-Barbera. The movie was released directly to VHS by First Independent Films in 1996 and later released as part of a double pack with The Snow Queen. It was released internationally by Warner Bros. in 1998. In 2004, it was released on DVD and re-released on VHS by Universal Pictures Video and Right Entertainment, with a later DVD bundle release in 2005.

== See also ==
- The Snow Queen (1995 film)

== Sources ==
- Toonhound - The Snow Queen's Revenge (1996)
- Behind The Voice Actors - The Snow Queen's Revenge
