= The Wild House =

1997-99 British TV series

- Created by: Jean Buchanan
- Starring: Ellie Beaven; Honeysuckle Weeks; Peter Kelly; Annette Ekblom; Philip Bird; Meg Johnson; Doreen Mantle; Catherine Bailey
- Country of origin: United Kingdom
- Original language: English
- No. of series: 3
- No. of episodes: 37

Production
- Camera setup: Video
- Running time: 22 minutes

Original release
- Network: BBC One (CBBC)
- Release: 8 January 1997 – 31 March 1999

The Wild House is a serialised children's programme produced between 1997 and 1999 broadcast by the BBC. The programme was based on an idea of Jean Buchanan's. Later series were written partially by Mark Haddon, author of The Curious Incident of the Dog in the Night-time. It follows the life of Natalie Wild (played by Ellie Beaven) and the other members of the Wild family.

== Information ==
The Wild House is a reference to the Wilds' surname and also gives an apt description of the family itself. Natalie, the seemingly 'normal' member of the family, is the character the programme centres around. The show is notable for its frequent use of soliloquy by all of the Wilds – even their dog, Jasper. The characters speak directly to the camera, commenting on their lives while dream-like images are projected behind.

By the second series, Serena has gone to Boston for a science scholarship. Later in the series, Mr. and Mrs. Wild join her in the USA. The family left behind are then looked after by aunts, uncles and their granny. Cousin Georgina, a feisty 16-year-old, also moves in. In the finale, the rest of the Wild family prepare to move stateside.

After the programme's last episode, the series' principal writer, Jean Buchanan, announced a new children's television series, Welcome to Orty Fou. While more of a light drama than a comedy, it was also based around an eccentric family with the same use of soliloquy.

== Characters ==
=== Natalie Wild ===
Played by Ellie Beaven, Natalie is the articulate 13-year-old middle child. The audience watches her grow up, with her primary concerns changing as the series goes on. Her character is the 'straight man' in the face of all the absurdities going on around her.

=== Serena Wild ===
Serena (played by Honeysuckle Weeks), 16, is a typical teenager with stereotypical teenage worries – the most prominent being romantic relationships. Her cousin, Georgina, who later takes her place in the cast, has similar problems, but her character is more rebellious and manipulative.

=== Arthur Wild ===
Nicknamed "Wart", Arthur (played by Peter Kelly) is defined by his obsession with wildlife. He is constantly seen with dirt on his clothes and skin, presumably from where he has been digging around looking for minibeasts, and he seems impervious to this. He has no understanding of his sisters' and cousin's attitudes towards romantic relationships, constantly saying, "Yuk!" at the slightest mention of them. He has a friend, Emily, who is just as obsessed with animals. Their relationship is entirely platonic. Only once, in the final episode, do they kiss, and even then they both say, "Yuk!" and wipe their mouths. A frequent saying of his is, "I bet David Attenborough never had this problem".

=== Mr. & Mrs. Wild ===
Played by Philip Bird and Annette Ekblom, Mr. and Mrs. Wild's characters do not take centre stage. They are, in most respects, 'typical' parents, with the exception of Mrs. Wild's using a megaphone whenever she wants to make an announcement.

== Cast ==
- Ellie Beaven – Natalie Wild
- Honeysuckle Weeks – Serena Wild (series 1 & 2)
- Peter Kelly – Arthur Wild
- Annette Ekblom – Mrs Wild (series 1 & 2)
- Philip Bird – Mr Wild (series 1 & 2)
- Meg Johnson – Aunt Yvette (series 2 & 3)
- Doreen Mantle – Granny (series 2 & 3)
- Catherine Bailey – Georgina (series 2 & 3)
- Tilly Gerrard – Emily (series 2 & 3)
- Holly Lambert – Annie Smerdon (series 2 & 3)
- John Glynn – Matt (series 2 & 3)
- Richard Burke – Dave (series 3)
- David Blair – Gavin (series 3)
- Jonathan Barlow – Uncle George (series 3)
- Susan Edmonstone – Aunt Penny (series 3)
- James Hickmott – Chris Kitto (series 1 – 3)

== Crew ==
- Jean Buchanan – Writer
- Andy Watts – Writer
- Mark Haddon – Writer
- Philip Gerard – Writer
- Sarah Louise Hawkins – Writer
- Philip Gerard – Writer
- Yvonne Coppard – Additional Material
- Mark Haddon – Additional Material
- Yvonne Coppard – Additional Material
- John Smith – Director
- Roger Singleton-Turner – Director
- Roz Anderson – Producer
- Marilyn Fox – Producer
- John Smith – Producer

== Production ==
- Episode length: 25 minutes
- Series One (12 episodes), 8 January – 26 March 1997, BBC1 Wednesday 4.35pm
- Series Two (12 episodes) 7 January – 25 March 1998, BBC1 Wednesday 4.35pm
- Series Three (13 episodes) 6 January – 31 March 1999, BBC1 Wednesday 4.35pm

Later production of Welcome to Orty-Fou:

- Series One (7 episodes) 21 September 1999 – 2 November 1999
- Series Two (7 episodes) 12 September 2000 – 24 October 2000

== Ratings (CBBC Channel) ==
- Tuesday 2 July 2002– 40,000 (3rd most watched on CBBC that week)
- Thursday 4 July 2002– 30,000 (8th most watched on CBBC that week)
