= The Snow Queen (1995 film) =

- British DVD cover art
- Directed by: Martin Gates
- Written by: Sue Radley; Martin Gates
- Based on: The Snow Queen by Hans Christian Andersen
- Produced by: Martin Gates
- Starring: Helen Mirren; Ellie Beaven; Hugh Laurie; Gary Martin; David Jason
- Music by: Chris Caswell; Doug Walter; Toby Alington
- Production company: Martin Gates Productions
- Distributed by: First Independent Films
- Release date: 1995
- Running time: 75 minutes
- Country: United Kingdom
- Language: English

The Snow Queen is a 1995 British animated fantasy adventure film co-written, directed and produced by Martin Gates and inspired by Hans Christian Andersen's 1844 fairy tale The Snow Queen, featuring Helen Mirren in the title role. In the film, the evil Snow Queen plans to use an enormous magic mirror to plunge the world into an eternal winter so she can rule it. When the mirror shatters and a couple of pieces enters the young Tom's body, she kidnaps him to have all the pieces. Tom's sister Ellie and her friend, Peeps the sparrow, set out to rescue him before it is too late. A direct sequel, The Snow Queen's Revenge, was released the following year.

== Plot ==
Ellie and her brother Tom listen to their grandmother reading them a story about the powerful and evil Snow Queen. When their younger sister Polly asks if she is coming, Tom says that she only exists in the story. However, the Queen really does live in an icy palace in the North Pole with her three troll servants: Eric, Baggy, and Wardrobe. Her plan is to set up her huge magic mirror on a mountain to reflect the sunlight away so the entire world will become her kingdom, but the mirror falls down the mountain and shatters into pieces. Two of its pieces hit Tom in the eye and the heart and he falls under a curse which turns him dark of spirit.

The Snow Queen sends her bats to retrieve the pieces. As they cannot take the two that are inside Tom, the Queen goes out to kidnap him herself. Ellie and Tom connect their sleds to a bigger sled that is revealed to be driven by the Queen. She takes Tom to her palace and cuts Ellie off, causing her to fall onto a talking sparrow named Peeps. Ellie goes out to save Tom and Peeps reluctantly decides to go with her. In a snowy forest, they find a house belonging to an old woman, who appears nice, but is actually a sly witch who traps them to use Ellie's heart for her elixir of life so she can be eternally young. Peeps tricks the witch's cat, Cuddles, into chasing after him and knocking over the elixir of life, and uses the confusion to unlock Ellie from her cage. Ellie and Peeps escape and trap the old woman and her cat in the basement by putting a box over the trapdoor, so they can avoid being chased by the old woman.

They then meet two humanoid ravens named Les and Ivy, who, from Ellie's description of Tom, tell her that Tom is going to marry the Princess, so Ellie becomes a member of the staff to serve the princess her food. However, she soon discovers that the Prince is not Tom. Meanwhile, Tom is rebuilding the Snow Queen's mirror, as he is good at puzzles. The trolls try to warn him that the Queen is going to kill him to get the last two pieces, but the Queen convinces him otherwise and kisses him, putting him into a hypnotic state while his veins are full of ice, and will cause his death when it reaches his heart.

The Princess and Prince give Ellie and Peeps a royal vehicle to ride to the Snow Queen's dominion, but they run into a robber gang of humanoid rats. The Robber King promises his daughter, Angorra, that Ellie can become her servant, but later changes his mind. Ellie is locked in a room with a flying reindeer Dimly who was captured by the robbers. Peeps enters the room and unties Ellie's hands, and she unties Dimly. Angorra enters, but they trap her with a barrel. Dimly flies them away, but the Robber King grabs onto the rope that is still wrapped around Dimly, resulting in the Robber King slamming into a building and falling over the edge on top of Angorra.

Dimly does not know where the Snow Queen is, so he goes to his flying reindeer school and asks Freda, an old Lapland woman who runs the school. Freda has Dimly fly them over to the Queen's castle. There, they meet the three trolls, who ultimately decide to help them. Tom does not have much time left, and has finished putting the mirror together except for the two pieces that are inside him. Freda reveals that the pieces inside him will kill him, then makes a potion that will dissolve the mirror. Ellie tells Tom to drink it, but just as he is about to, the Queen blasts the vial away with her magic staff. They fight the Queen, but she freezes Eric and Freda, and Baggy and Wardrobe grab her staff just as they are frozen as well. The battle eventually causes the vial to fall on top of the mirror and shatter, dissolving the mirror and forming an icy cyclone that chases after the Queen's flying carriage and freezes her solid as she attempts to escape. The mirror pieces inside Tom dissolve and the effects of the Queen's kiss go away, freeing him. Freda and the trolls are unfrozen.

Freda warns the Snow Queen is not destroyed and will return in the future. She has Dimly take Ellie, Tom, and Peeps back to the village, and then come back for her and the trolls. Dimly crash lands in the village and Ellie, Tom, and Peeps go to listen to the rest of the story as Dimly heads back to the Queen's palace. The film ends with a close-up shot of the frozen Queen's eyes lighting up ominously.

== Cast ==
- Ellie Beaven as Ellie, a courageous and optimistic young girl with a kind heart.
- Helen Mirren as the mysterious and evil Snow Queen, the magical ruler of the North and South Poles.
- Damian Hunt as Tom, the intelligent twin brother of Ellie.
- Hugh Laurie as Peeps, a house sparrow and Ellie's best friend.
- Gary Martin as Dimly, a reindeer who struggles with flying.
- Julia McKenzie as Grandma, the grandmother of Ellie, Tom and Polly who looks after them; Old Woman, a polite woman who is secretly an evil witch; and Freda, the headmistress of a flying school for reindeer.
- David Jason as Eric, the leader of the Snow Queen's unwilling troll minions.
- Colin Marsh as Baggy, a bumbling troll and Wardrobe's best friend.
- Russell Floyd as Wardrobe, a dim-witted troll and the kindest of the three.
- Scarlett Strallen as the Princess, an energetic and playful young princess.
- Rik Mayall as the Robber King, a rat who is the leader of a gang of thieves.
- Richard Tate as Les, a raven who works for the Royal Household and the husband of Ivy.
- Imelda Staunton as Ivy, a raven who likes picking flowers and the wife of Les; and Angorra, a rat who is also the spoiled and bratty daughter of the Robber King.
- Rowan D'Albert as the Prince, an immature but clever boy with a big appetite who has recently married Princess Amy.
- Zizi Strallen as Polly, the younger sister of Ellie and Tom.

== Production and release ==
The Snow Queen had been in production since 1991, originally planned to be released as a 90-minute film in 1993, but was completed only in 1995. This was in part due to the legal problems in the Philippines.

The movie was released directly to VHS by First Independent Films in 1995 and later released as part of a double pack with The Snow Queen's Revenge. In 2004, it was released on DVD and re-released on VHS by Universal Pictures Video and Right Entertainment, with a later DVD bundle release in 2005. Outside the United Kingdom, such as the United States and Russia, Warner Bros held the rights, and released it straight to VHS in 1998 and later on DVD in 2004.

== Reception ==
The Australian Centre for the Moving Image described the film as "an engaging story of adventure and the classic triumph of good over evil." Jack Zipes called it "highly comic [and] neatly drawn", praising the "numerous changes that liven the action and transform the plot in unusual ways". He wrote that "there's nothing glitzy in this animated film and yet it sparkles with an unusual approach to a humourless tale."

== Sequel ==
The Snow Queen's Revenge is a 1996 sequel in which the Snow Queen returns to life, setting out to seek revenge on those who ruined her plans to rule the world, and it is up to young Ellie and her friends to stop her again. Some of the voice cast changed in the second film.

== Sources ==
- Toonhound - The Snow Queen (1995)
