= Brian Conley: This Way Up =

- Presented by: Brian Conley
- Country of origin: United Kingdom
- Original language: English
- No. of series: 2
- No. of episodes: 13

Production
- Running time: 30 minutes (including commercials)
- Production company: LWT

Original release
- Network: ITV
- Release: 20 May 1989 – 1 June 1990

Brian Conley: This Way Up is a sketch comedy show starring Brian Conley. It was originally broadcast from 20 May 1989 to 1 June 1990 on ITV in the United Kingdom. Whilst the show wasn't as popular as its successor, The Brian Conley Show, This Way Up gave one of Conley's most popular characters, Nick Frisbee and Larry the Loafer, their debut.

This Way Up ran for two series. The final show ended with Brian saying "See you next year!". Although a third series was never produced in 1991, The Brian Conley Show started the following year. The show led Conley to be named the freshest face on ITV, and he was awarded the "Most Promising Artiste" title at the 1991 Variety Club Awards.

During the late 1990s, the show was repeated regularly on satellite channel Granada Plus.
