= Take Me (TV series) =

- Genre: Drama
- Created by: Caleb Ranson
- Written by: Caleb Ranson
- Directed by: Alex Pillai
- Starring: Robson Green; Beth Goddard; Julia Mallam; Danny Webb; Olga Sosnovska; Annette Ekblom; Aneirin Hughes; Keith Barron
- Country of origin: United Kingdom
- Original language: English
- No. of series: 1
- No. of episodes: 6

Production
- Executive producers: Sandra Jobling; Judy Counihan; Philip Hinchcliffe
- Producer: Bill Boyes
- Running time: 60 minutes (including advertisements)
- Production companies: Scottish Television (STV Studios); Coastal Productions

Original release
- Network: ITV
- Release: 5 August – 27 August 2001

Take Me is the title of a 2001 British television drama serial on ITV, starring Robson Green and Beth Goddard. The series was produced by STV Studios, then known as "SMG TV Productions", and Coastal. It was filmed between October and December 2000 and first broadcast in the UK on 5 August 2001. Alex Pillai was the director.

The series was filmed in multiple locations, including Newcastle upon Tyne city centre; Wynyard Park, Billingham; Mitford Hall, Morpeth; Low Hauxley Beach; Samsung Factory at Billingham (Middlesbrough); the Cammell Laird Shipyard, Hebburn; and St. Aloysius Church, Hebburn.

== Plot ==
Jack Chambers (Robson Green) and his wife, Kay (Beth Goddard), move into their new house on the Hadleigh corner estate – only to become embroiled in a tangled web of sexual relationships and secrets involving their neighbours, Doug Patton (Danny Webb) and his wife, Andrea (Olga Sosnovska). To make matters worse, Jack's work life has fallen into disrepair after his secretary Helen (Tara Moran) tries to seduce him, and he discovers his best friend, Kevin (Gilly Gilchrist), is having an affair with his wife. As the situation intensifies, Jack is caught up in the covering up of a murder, and Kay is left wondering who the father of her baby is when she falls pregnant. Meanwhile, Jack is forced to deal with the increasing pressure of his elderly father Don (Keith Barron).

== Cast ==
- Robson Green as Jack Chambers, businessman
- Beth Goddard as Kay Chambers, Jack's wife
- Julia Mallam as Maggie Chambers, Jack and Kay's daughter
- Danny Webb as Doug Patton, Jack and Kay's neighbour
- Olga Sosnovska as Andrea Patton, Doug's wife
- Annette Ekblom as Lauren Vincent, Kay's older sister
- Aneirin Hughes as Sam Vincent, Lauren's husband
- Keith Barron as Don Chambers, Jack's father
- Gilly Gilchrist as Kevin Denton, Jack's best friend and colleague
- Tara Moran as Helen Jefferson, Jack's colleague and admirer

== Episode list ==
No.	Title	Directed by	Written by	British air date	UK viewers (million)
1	"Episode 1"	Alex Pillai	Caleb Ranson	5 August 2001	7.37
Jack and Kay's move into a new neighbourhood is welcomed by their friendly neighbours, Doug and Andrea, who invite them to their weekly summer garden party – but they are unaware the party is for swingers to meet and have sex with strangers. Meanwhile, Jack's work life takes an interesting turn when he is recommended for promotion into the position previously held by his best friend, Kevin, who is being squeezed out of the company. Jack, however, is unaware that Kevin and Kay are having an affair.
2	"Episode 2"	Alex Pillai	Caleb Ranson	5 August 2001	7.37
Jack and Doug's friendship begins to grow, while his marriage continues to fall apart. Matters aren't helped when he and his daughter, Maggie, spot Kay and Kevin sharing an illicit kiss in a hotel car park. Jack decides to take a leap in the dark and join in with the latest swingers party, pairing Kay off with a fellow party-goer. Kevin's leaving party at the firm is interrupted by an angry Maggie, who confronts him over his affair with her mother. Don turns up on Jack's doorstep after being thrown out by his wife.
3	"Episode 3"	Alex Pillai	Caleb Ranson	6 August 2001	6.69
Jack suspects that Doug may be involved in the disappearance of their neighbour Lillian Stokes, after he discovers Doug has disposed of a number of letters addressed to Lillian that he claimed he was going to forward on to her new address in New Zealand. Jack and Andrea choose to forgo a night of passion and instead go on a 'first date', while Don's continued deteriorating health leads Jack to a difficult situation. Later, he arrives home to find Don being taken away by paramedics, having had a heart attack.
4	"Episode 4"	Alex Pillai	Caleb Ranson	13 August 2001	6.56
Jack and Kay attend a swingers' party at a country hotel, but the night quickly descends into disaster when Jack finds an inconsolable Doug, who claims that he has accidentally killed his latest sexual partner when a game of foreplay went too far. Doug persuades Jack to help him dispose of the body, but after a close shave with the police, Jack is led to believe Doug may have lied to him all along when the woman he is supposed to have killed turns up in the hotel bar where Jack is holding a business meeting.
5	"Episode 5"	Alex Pillai	Caleb Ranson	20 August 2001	6.21
After the police confirm that the body found is that of the woman Jack knew as Janet Taylor, Jack realises that Doug intended to frame him for murder all along. Andrea tries to help confirm Jack's suspicions by leaving the house unlocked when she and Doug go on a night out, but it doesn't take Doug long to work out what is going on, and he has Jack arrested for burglary. Meanwhile, Kay continues to deliberate whether or not to keep the baby, but her decision isn't helped when Lauren tells Sam that the baby is his.
6	"Episode 6"	Alex Pillai	Caleb Ranson	27 August 2001	5.16
Andrea seeks solace in Jack's seaside hideaway, but it's not long before Doug catches up with her. Kevin gives Jack a secret tip-off about the supposed deal he is about to close. Doug goes on the rampage and digs up Jack's living room floor with a power drill, only to reveal the location of the missing body of Lillian Stokes. Just as Jack realises what is going on, he arrives home to find Doug has taken Maggie hostage with a knife to her throat – forcing Andrea to make a shock decision that will affect everyone.
