= Marion Montgomery =

American jazz singer (1934–2002)

- Born: Marian Maud Runnells; November 17 1934; Natchez, Mississippi, U.S.
- Died: July 22, 2002 (aged 67); Bray, Berkshire, England
- Spouse: Laurie Holloway (m. 1965)
- Children: 1

Marion Montgomery (November 17, 1934 – July 22, 2002) was an American jazz singer, who lived for the majority of her life in the United Kingdom.

== Biography ==
Born Marian Maud Runnells (she later changed the spelling of Marian to Marion) in Natchez, Mississippi, she began her career in Atlanta working clubs, and then in Chicago, where singer Peggy Lee heard her on an audition tape and suggested she should be signed up by Capitol Records, releasing three albums for them in the early and mid-1960s. During this early part of her career, she became Marian Montgomery, having previously gone by the nickname of Pepe. In 1963, she released the original version of the song "That's Life", made famous after its 1966 release by Frank Sinatra.

In 1965, she came to Britain to play a season with John Dankworth, and met and married English pianist and musical director Laurie Holloway, thus beginning a long and productive association in which they both became well known to British jazz, cabaret and television audiences.

She numbered amongst her admirers Nat King Cole, Frank Sinatra and British chat show host Michael Parkinson, on whose show she became resident singer in the 1970s. In 1976, she sang in a comedy musical sketch with Morecambe & Wise. She also famously collaborated with composer and conductor Richard Rodney Bennett for a series of concerts and albums in the 1980s and early 1990s.

In the late 1960s and early 1970s, her recording of the song "Maybe the Morning" (contained on her 1972 album Marion in the Morning) was used by Radio Luxembourg each evening to close the station, and again as the final song to be heard on the station when it closed in 1992. Her final studio recording was That Lady from Natchez, released in 1997. She continued to perform until just before her death, including a sell-out three week season at London's "Pizza on the Park" in April 2002.

== Death ==
She died in Bray, Berkshire, England, aged 67, in July 2002 10 years after being diagnosed with lung cancer, which she always blamed on passive smoking from working in nightclubs, though she herself had never smoked.

== Discography ==
=== LPs ===
- Swings for Winners and Losers, Capitol (1962)
- Let There Be Love, Let There Be Swing, Let There Be, Capitol (1963)
- Lovin' is Livin', Capitol (1964)
- What's New?, Decca (1966)
- Anything Goes - 1969 London Cast Recording, Decca UK (1969)
- In the Morning, Polydor 2383159 (1972)
- Surprise, Surprise (with Richard Rodney Bennett), Cube HIFLY 24 (1977)
- Town and Country (with Richard Rodney Bennett), Cube HIFLY 28 (1978)
- On Stage!, Cube HIFLY 29 (1978)
- Puttin' on the Ritz (with Richard Rodney Bennett), Cube HIFLY 40, (1984)
- I Gotta Right to Sing (live at Ronnie Scott's Club), Jazz House Records, 003 1988 (1988)

=== CDs ===
- Sometimes in the Night, See for Miles (1989)
- Nice and Easy (live), Ronnie Scott's Jazz, (1990)
- Mellow, See for Miles (1993)
- I Gotta Right to Sing (live), Ronnie Scott's Jazz (1993) (reissue)
- Makin' Whoopie (with Mart Rodger Manchester Jazz), Bowstone Records (1993)
- For the Love of Mercer Vol 1, Elgin (1996)
- For the Love of Mercer Vol 2, Elgin (1996)
- That Lady from Natchez, Audiophile (1997)
- Ballads and Blues, Elgin (2001)
- What's New? Universal (2002) (CD reissue)
- Skylark, UCJ (2004)
- Marion Montgomery, EMI (2005) (two-disc CD reissue of Let There be MM and Lovin' is Livin')
