= Catherine Bailey (actress) =

British actress (born 1980)

- Born: 2 January 1980 (age 46); London, England
- Occupation: Actress
- Years active: 1993–present
- Notable work: Uncle Jack and Cleopatra's Mummy; The Wild House; House of Anubis; A Quiet Passion
- Website: www.catherinebaileyactor.com

Catherine Bailey (born 2 January 1980) is a British actress.

== Career ==
Catherine Bailey made her acting debut in 1993, when she was cast in the leading role of Helen Green in the short-lived children's series, Uncle Jack and Cleopatra's Mummy. This was followed by another role in a children's series, The Wild House as Georgina, for which she made her first appearance at the beginning of the second series in 1998 until the show's conclusion in 1999.

Bailey went on to guest roles in a number of British television series, including Peak Practice, My Family, Rosemary & Thyme, Holby City, The Bill, EastEnders, The Sarah Jane Adventures, Doctors, Midsomer Murders, Mr Selfridge, The Crown and Vera.

As an established thratre performer, Bailey has appeared on several stage productions, some of which include Spring Awakening at the Royal Shakespeare Company, which was her 1995 stage debut, 'Tis Pity She's a Whore, The Country Wife, A Midsummer Night's Dream, The 39 Steps and The Merchant of Venice.

Her first film role came in 2012, when she was cast in the crime drama, The Grind, followed by performances in A Quiet Passion, with Cynthia Nixon, and the French film Dernier amour (Casanova, Last Love).

Bailey has also served as a voice artist for radio, such as the role of Margaret Bishop in the BBC Radio 4 series, Home Front, as well as work in the video games Battlefleet Gothic: Armada 2, GreedFall, The Bradwell Conspiracy,Assassin's Creed: Valhalla and Babylon's Fall.

She is the founder of BAZ Productions, alongside Sarah Bedi and Emma Luffingham. Their production consist of stage works Macbeth (2011), Prophecy (2013) and The Process (2020), which also starred Bailey.

== Filmography ==
Film
Year	Film	Role	Notes
1993	Who Dealt?	Helen	TV film
2001	Hawkins	Jenny	TV film
2001	It's Not You, It's Me	Kerry	Short film
2005	The English Harem	Annie	TV film
2007	The Marchioness Disaster	Police Officer #4	TV film
2007	Shades of Mourning	Alice	Short film
2009	A Midsummer Night's Dream	Helena/Snug	Filmed stage performance for television
2012	The Grind	Paramedic 2	Feature film
Unreleased (Note: Filmed around 2013 and 2014. It was intended for release in the summer of 2014, and then delayed until 2019, but currently remains unreleased.)	Nicole and O.J.	Marcia Clark	Feature film
2015	Globe on Screen: Julius Caesar	Portia	Filmed stage performance
2016	A Quiet Passion	Vryling Buffam	Feature Film
2019	Dernier amour	Soeur de Lady Hortense	Feature film
2025	The Juice	Marcia Clark	Feature film (pre-production)

Television series
Year	Film	Role	Notes
1993	Uncle Jack and Cleopatra's Mummy	Helen Green	Series 1 (main role, 6 episodes)
1998–99	The Wild House	Georgina Wild	Series 2–3 (main role, 25 episodes)
2000	Holby City	Jo Cartwright	Series 3, Episode 5
2000	Peak Practice	Helen Randle	Series 10, Episode 9
2001	The Residents	Tina Conan Jnr	Series 1, Episode 1
2001	The Infinite Worlds of H.G. Wells	Violet	Miniseries (6 episodes)
2001	Urban Gothic	Leigh	Series 2, Episode 2
Unaired (Note: Appeared in series 2, episodes 2 & 6. The second series was intended to broadcast in winter 2001, but remains unaired.)	High Stakes	Jenny	Series 2, Episodes 2 & 6
2002	My Family	Kate	Series 3, Episode 10
2004	55 Degrees North	Michelle	Series 1, Episode 2
2004	Rosemary & Thyme	Chantal Parsons	Series 2, Episode 7
2005	Egypt: Rediscovering a Lost World	Zoe	Miniseries (1 episode)
2006	The Bill	Karen Ingram	Series 22, Episode 49
2007, 2010	EastEnders	P.C. Shona Blake	8 episodes
2008	Doctors	Anne Alexander	Series 10, Episode 141
2009	Holby City	DS Karen Roberts	Series 12, Episodes 1 & 2
2010	The Bill	Evie Ferrier	Series 26, Episode 15
2010	The Sarah Jane Adventures	Miss Wyckham	Series 4, Episode 10
2011	House of Anubis	Esther Robinson	Series 1 (Recurring role, 13 episodes)
2013	Doctors	Sammy Jo Rinsler	Series 15, Episode 49
2014	Midsomer Murders	Stephanie Weston	Series 16, Episode 3
2015	And Then There Were None	Olivia Ogilvie Hamilton	Miniseries (2 episodes)
2016	Mr Selfridge	Nina	Series 4, Episodes 1 & 7
2017	Strike	Jess	Series 1, Episodes 4 & 5
2017	The Crown	Elizabeth Cavendish	Series 2, Episodes 4 & 7
2018	Hetty Feather	Louisa Hooper	Series 4, Episode 4
2020	Malory Towers	Miss Gale	Series 1, Episode 5
2021	Grace	Francine	Series 1, Episode 1
2021	Whitstable Pearl	Fi Marston	Series 1, Episode 2
2022	Vera	Katy Turner (uncredited))	Series 11, Episode 4
2023	Smothered	Elaine	Series 1, Episode 4
2024	Heartstopper	Kath Newnham	Series 3, Episode 6
2024	The Day of the Jackal	Siobhan	Series 1, Episode 7
2025	Prisoner 951	Rebecca Ratcliffe	Mini-series

Voice performances
Year	Film	Role	Notes
2018–19	Blake's 7: The Classic Adventures	Mida/Mudoid/Captain	40th Anniversary Special & Series 5, Episode 7
2018	Doctor Who: The Fourth Doctor Adventures	Maddox/Creature	Podcast series; Season 7, Episode 5
2018	Doctor Who: The Monthly Adventures	Tan	Podcast series; Episode 239
2019	The Three Musketeers		Amazon Audible original
2019	Battlefleet Gothic: Armada 2	Venesca Catallia	Video game
2019	GreedFall	Daren/various characters	Video game
2019	The Bradwell Conspiracy	Melissa	Video game
2020	Assassin's Creed: Valhalla	Sister Frideswid	Video game
2022	Babylon's Fall	Maia/Nergal/various	Video game (English version)
2024	Star Wars: Outlaws		Video game
2024	Dragon Age: The Veilguard	Curio/various voices	Video game

== Theatre credits ==
- Spring Awakening as Ilse (1995, Royal Shakespeare Company)
- 'Tis Pity She's a Whore as Philotis (1999, Young Vic Theatre. Revived in 2001 for BBC radio)
- Walk Hard, Talk Loud as Dorothy (2005, Tricycle Theatre)
- Sit and Shiver as Shirley (2006–07, New End Theatre & Hackney Empire)
- The Country Wife as Lucy (2007, Theatre Royal Haymarket)
- House of Agnes as Michaela (2008, Oval House Theatre)
- A Midsummer Night's Dream as Helena (2009, Middle Temple Hall/BBC Radio 3)
- The Changeling as Isabella (2009, BBC Radio 3)
- The 39 Steps as Annabella/Margaret/Pamela (2011–13, Criterion Theatre)
- Julius Caesar as Portia (2014, Shakespeare's Globe)
- Dr Scroggy's War as Honourable Penelope Wedgewood (2014, Shakespeare's Globe)
- The Merchant of Venice as Portia (2014, Shakespeare's Globe)
- King Lear as Goneril (2016, Royal and Derngate Theatre and UK tour)
- Othello as Bianca (2018, Shakespeare's Globe)
- The Process as Anita (2020, BAZ productions, The Bunker Theatre)
