= Laurie Holloway =

English pianist and composer (1938–2025)

Laurie Holloway MBE
- Born: Laurence Holloway; 31 March 1938; Oldham, Lancashire, England
- Died: 9 January 2025 (aged 86) Bray, Berkshire, England
- Genre: Jazz
- Occupations: Musical director; composer
- Instruments: Piano
- Years active: 1954–2020
- Spouse: Marion Montgomery (m. 1965; died 2002)

Laurence Holloway (31 March 1938 – 9 January 2025) was an English pianist, musical director and composer. In the 1970s he was the musical director for the singer Engelbert Humperdinck, and on the television talk show Parkinson. From 2004 to 2006, he was the original musical director for the BBC's Strictly Come Dancing.

== Early career ==
Holloway was born in Oldham on 31 March 1938, into a musical family. He was playing piano from the age of four, taking his first formal lessons aged seven. At the age of 12 he was the organist and choirmaster at his local church. He began performing at ballroom dances and turned professional in 1954 when he joined Syd Willmott and his Band as a pianist. He later played with Geraldo on cruise ships, with the Cyril Stapleton band, and then as a studio session musician, playing on many tracks, including on "Downtown" by Petula Clark with musical director Tony Hatch in 1964. With actor Bob Grant, Holloway composed two musical stage comedies in the 1960s. Instant Marriage, a farce starring Joan Sims, ran for most of 1964 at the Piccadilly Theatre. His second, Tristram Shandy, Gentleman, was not produced.

== Jazz, cabaret and television ==
Holloway became more associated with jazz after working as musical director for the singer Cleo Laine, which soon led to him joining the John Dankworth Band as pianist and arranger. He worked with Dankworth on the 1967 album The $1,000,000,000 Collection and on subsequent Dankworth albums. However, more studio and television work soon took over. From 1970 until 1975 he was musical director for Engelbert Humperdinck, working on his albums and touring the US, including Las Vegas. Other artists he worked with include Stephane Grappelli, Tom Jones, Judy Garland, Liza Minnelli, Sammy Davis Jr., Gilbert O’Sullivan, Mel Torme, Dame Kiri Te Kanawa, Lesley Garrett, Bob Monkhouse, Barry Humphries and Ronnie Corbett. He composed several well-known television theme tunes such as Game for a Laugh, Wicked Women, Maggie and Her, Blind Date and Beadle's About. He also composed "Hook, Line and Sinker" for the 1970 LWT fishing series Casting Around.

In 1990, Holloway accompanied Queen Elizabeth II and her sister, Princess Margaret, on the piano for a recording the two made of Scottish childhood songs at Buckingham Palace for the 90th birthday of their mother, Queen Elizabeth The Queen Mother. A single cassette was produced featuring a dozen songs, but the recording was lost after the queen mother's death.

His professional association with Michael Parkinson (a Berkshire neighbour and friend) began in 1998 when he became the second musical director of the Parkinson chat show (after Harry Stoneham, who composed the theme tune and directed the first run from 1971 to 1982). He worked on the show until 2004 for BBC, and when the show transferred to ITV from 2004 to 2007. In 2004, he became the musical director for the first three series of the popular dance show Strictly Come Dancing, for which he provided many arrangements every week.

== Personal life and death ==
Holloway was awarded the Gold Badge of Merit by the British Academy of Composers and Songwriters and he appeared as a subject of This Is Your Life. He was appointed Member of the Order of the British Empire (MBE) in the 2013 Birthday Honours for services to music.

He was married to the singer Marion Montgomery from 1965 until her death in 2002. They had a daughter. From the late 1960s he lived in The Fisheries, Bray, Berkshire.

Holloway died after a brief illness in Berkshire, on 9 January 2025, aged 86.

== Discography ==
- Jazz Box Jazz 1957
- Instant Marriage, 1964 West End musical
- Hit Parade Holloway Style 1966
- Good Time 1967
- The Great Piano Hits Holloway Style 1967
- Piano On The Roof 1967
- Marian In The Morning 1972
- Cumulus 1979
- Brandenburg Boogie
- About Time 1993
- Blue Skies & Other Vistas 1996
- Showtime (Elgin)
- Laurie Holloway Trio: live at Abbey Road 2000 (Grasmere Records)
- Loesser Genius with Cleo Laine (Qnote, 2003)
- Laurie Holloway - The Piano Player 2004 (Universal Records)
- Strictly Come Dancing – Bruce Forsyth & the Laurie Holloway Orchestra 2004 (Sony Records)
