= Honeysuckle Weeks =

British actress

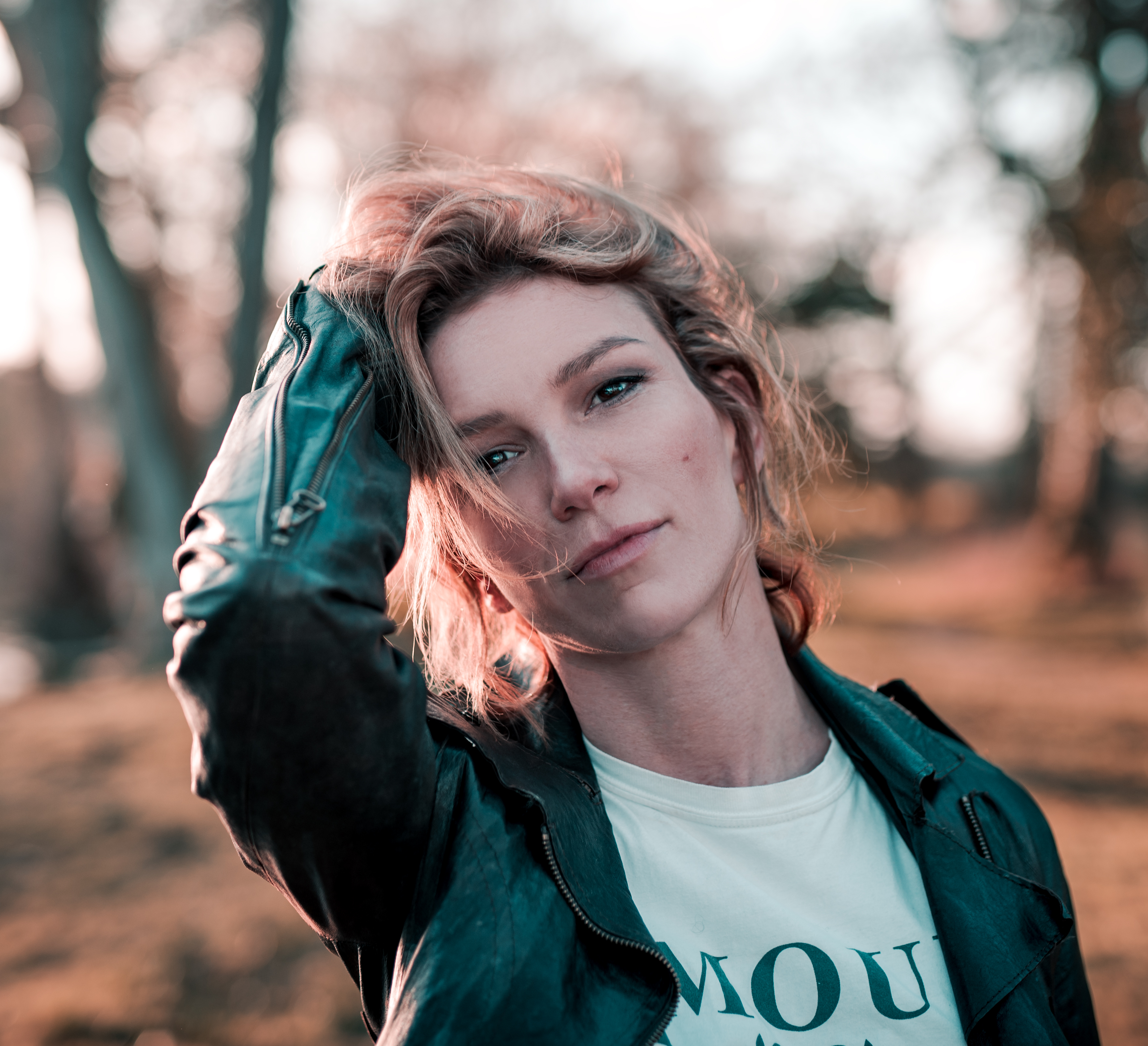
- Weeks in 2018
- Born: Honeysuckle Susan Weeks; 1 August 1979 (age 47); Cardiff, Wales, UK
- Education: Pembroke College, Oxford
- Occupation: Actress
- Years active: 1993–present
- Spouse: Lorne Stormonth Darling (m. 2007; div. 2019)
- Children: 1
- Relatives: Perdita Weeks (sister); Rollo Weeks (brother)

Honeysuckle Susan Weeks (born 1 August 1979) is a British actress best known for her role as Samantha Stewart (later Wainwright) in the ITV wartime drama series Foyle's War.

== Early life ==
Weeks was born in Cardiff, Wales, to Robin and Susan (née Wade) Weeks, and grew up in Chichester and Petworth, both in West Sussex, England. Her parents named her after the plant honeysuckle, which flowered when she was born. She has a younger sister Perdita and brother Rollo, who have also pursued careers in acting.

Weeks was educated at Great Ballard School, Roedean School, and Pembroke College, Oxford, where she read English. She also spent time studying art on the John Hall Pre-university Course in Venice, Italy. As a child she was a member of the Chichester Festival Theatre. From the age of nine, Weeks studied at the Sylvia Young Theatre School at the weekends.

At age eleven, Weeks was flown to the United States and cast in the Walt Disney Pictures feature A Far Off Place directed by Steven Spielberg. However, when Spielberg dropped out of the project, Weeks' role was re-cast with Reese Witherspoon.

== Acting career ==
=== Television ===
Despite missing out on a film role, Weeks was cast in 1993 as the juvenile lead role of Kitty Killen in the television adaptation of Anne Fine's Goggle-Eyes. Her sister Perdita and brother Rollo also appeared with her in small roles in the third episode of that series. The part gained her considerable attention, and she was interviewed by Alan Titchmarsh on the TV show Pebble Mill about her role in the series. She quickly became a familiar face to viewers, appearing in a number of Ruth Rendell adaptations, such as A Dark-Adapted Eye (1994), and The Ruth Rendell Mysteries episodes "The Strawberry Tree" (1995) and "The Orchid Walls" (1998), while she had a notable role in The Bill in 1995, playing a kidnap victim in the feature length episode "Deadline", with David Tennant as her abductor.

In 1997, Honeysuckle and Perdita were both cast in Catherine Cookson's The Rag Nymph, wherein Perdita played the younger version of her sister's character. It was a significant role for Honeysuckle, and she gained further fame when she appeared in the children's TV series The Wild House that year, appearing from 1997 to 1998. She appeared in the raunchy BBC serial Close Relations in 1998 as she sought to move to more adult roles, and continued to receive regular acting work, such as in Midsomer Murders (1999). In 2002, she was cast as Samantha Stewart in the TV series Foyle's War a BAFTA Award–winning detective series set in Hastings during and just after World War II; she starred opposite Michael Kitchen and was featured in every episode of all eight series, which were broadcast between 2002 and 2015.

She continued to find other roles during this period. In 2006 she appeared in the Poirot mystery "Cards on the Table", while in 2007, Weeks starred in The Inspector Lynley Mysteries as Tania Thompson, a character based on the Canadian serial killer Karla Homolka. In 2008, she appeared as Harriet Pringle in the Radio 4 adaptation of Fortunes of War. In 2012, she played a small part as Mrs Beeton in an episode of the BBC educational programme The Charles Dickens Show.

After Foyle's War ended in 2015, she appeared as Mae Harmer in the BBC TV series Death in Paradise (series 4), while in May that year, she portrayed a wartime letter writer at VE Day 70: A Party to Remember in Horse Guards Parade, London that was broadcast live on BBC1. She also appeared in the ITV series Lewis episode "Magnum Opus". The following year she appeared in the TV series The Five as Laura Marshall, before personal events saw her take a break from acting for the next three years.

In 2019, Weeks guest starred in an episode of Frankie Drake Mysteries as author Agatha Christie. It was her first appearance back on screen in three years, and she followed it up with an appearance in the Channel 4 series Maxxx in the episode "House Party".

=== Film ===
Weeks has appeared as Annie Ridd in the TV movie Lorna Doone in 2000, and Sarah in My Brother Tom in 2001. In 2005 she was cast as Clarissa in Red Mercury. She played Sir Lachlan's head groom Lolly in The Wicker Tree (the "spiritual successor" to The Wicker Man) in 2011.

=== Audio drama ===
In 2016, Weeks had a recurring role as Heleyna in the Big Finish Productions audio play series The War Doctor, based on the TV series Doctor Who.

=== Stage acting ===
Title	Year	Role	Notes
Agatha Christie play A Daughter's A Daughter	2010	Sarah Prentice	Trafalgar Studios
Pygmalion	2010	Eliza Doolittle	Chichester Festival Theatre
Melanie Marnich's play These Shining Lives	2013		UK premiere at Park Theatre (London)
King Lear (rehearsed reading in aid of the Motor Neurone Disease Association)	2013	Cordelia	The Other Palace and The Old Vic
Gore Vidal's play The Best Man	2018	Mabel Cantwell	Playhouse Theatre
Calendar Girls - The Musical	2023	ensemble	Theatre Royal, Windsor
Accolade	2024	Rona Trenting	Theatre Royal, Windsor
Anne-Marie Casey's adaptation of Little Women	2025	Marmee	Touring

== Personal life ==
Weeks was engaged to the poet and musician Anno Birkin for a short period before his death, at age 20, in a car crash in Italy in 2001.

While on holiday in the Himalayas in 2005, she married hypnotherapist Lorne Stormonth Darling, of a landed gentry family of Lednathie, Kirriemuir, Scotland, in an impromptu Buddhist ceremony, followed by a London wedding in July 2007. The couple have a son, born in 2011, and lived in Petworth. The marriage ended in 2019. Darling died 16 November 2023, aged 60.

In August 2015, Weeks was caught speeding on the A3 in south-west London. It later emerged that she was already banned from driving under the totting-up scheme, due to points violations, and in early 2016 was ordered to wear an electronic tag when the court imposed a four-week night time curfew on her. In January 2023, Weeks was again banned from driving, this time following an incident in which she reversed into a parked vehicle whilst having consumed more than twice the legal limit for alcohol.

In July 2016, it was reported that Weeks had gone missing, with relatives said to be concerned for her welfare. However, she was later found safe and well and remained with police late that night before returning to West Sussex. Weeks has bipolar disorder and has spoken openly about this.

Weeks is a vegetarian.

== Awards and nominations ==
In 2004, Weeks was nominated in the Most Popular Newcomer category at the National Television Awards.

== Filmography ==
Title	Year	Role	Notes
Goggle-Eyes	1993	Kitty Killen	4-part miniseries (appeared in all episodes)
A Dark-Adapted Eye	1994	Young Faith	2-part miniseries (appeared in Episode 1)
The Ruth Rendell Mysteries	1995	Young Petra Saunderton	Series 8, episode 4 - "The Strawberry Tree: Part 1"
The Bill	1995	Lucy Dean	Series 11, episode 128 - "Deadline"
The Bill	1996	Deborah White	Series 12, episode 64 - "Cuckoo"
Have Your Cake and Eat It	1997	Sophie Dawson	4-part miniseries (appeared in all episodes)
The Rag Nymph	1997	Millie	3-part miniseries (appeared in all episodes)
The Wild House	1997–1998	Serena Wild	Main role; Series 1 and 2 (18 episodes)
Close Relations	1998	Imogen	6-part miniseries (appeared in Episodes 1–5)
The Ruth Rendell Mysteries	1998	Jenny	Series 11, episode 7 - "The Orchard Walls"
Midsomer Murders	1999	Fleur Bridges	Series 2, episode 4 - "Blood Will Out"
Casualty	2000	Diane Gibson	Series 15, episode 1 - "Phoenix"
Lorna Doone	2000	Annie Ridd	Television film
Victoria Wood with All the Trimmings	2000	Alice Cottisloe	Christmas special
My Brother Tom	2001	Sarah	Feature film
Foyle's War	2002–2015	Samantha Stewart / Samantha Wainwright	Main role; 8 series (28 episodes)
Red Mercury	2005	Clarissa	Feature film
Agatha Christie's Poirot	2005	Rhoda Dawes	Series 10, episode 2 - "Cards on the Table"
Where the Heart Is	2006	Carly	Series 10, episode 7 - "Don't Look Back in Anger"
The Inspector Lynley Mysteries	2007	Tania Thompson	Series 6, episode 2 - "Know Thine Enemy"
The Bill	2009	Julie Nowak	Series 25, episodes 12 and 13 - "Righteous Kill" (Parts 1 and 2)
The Wicker Tree	2011	Lolly	Feature film
The A to Z of Crime	2011	Herself	6-part series (appeared in 3 episodes)
The Charles Dickens Show	2012	Mrs. Beeton	4-part miniseries (appeared in Episode 3 - "Christmas")
The Late Late Show With Craig Ferguson	2014	Herself	Show 1,939 (28 May 2014)
Death in Paradise	2015	Mae Harmer	Series 4, episode 8 - "Unlike Father, Unlike Son"
Lewis	2015	Carina Beskin	Series 9, episodes 3 and 4 - "Magnum Opus" (Parts 1 and 2)
The Five	2016	Laura Marshall	Series 1 (4 episodes)
Frankie Drake Mysteries	2019	Agatha Christie	Series 3, episode 1 - "No Friends Like Old Friends"
Maxxx	2020	Christy	Series 1, Episode 2 (House Party)
