= Brian Walker =

Brian Walker may refer to:

- Brian Walker (American football) (born 1972), former American football safety in the National Football League
- Brian Walker (ecologist), scientist working on ecological sustainability and resilience in social-ecological systems
- Brian Walker (ice hockey) (born 1952), Canadian former professional ice hockey player
- Brian Walker (politician) (born 1954), member of the Western Australian Legislative Council
- Brian Walker (toy inventor), toy inventor from Bend, Oregon

== See also ==
- Bryan Walker (disambiguation)
