= Julia McKenzie =

English actress (born 1941)

Julia McKenzie CBE
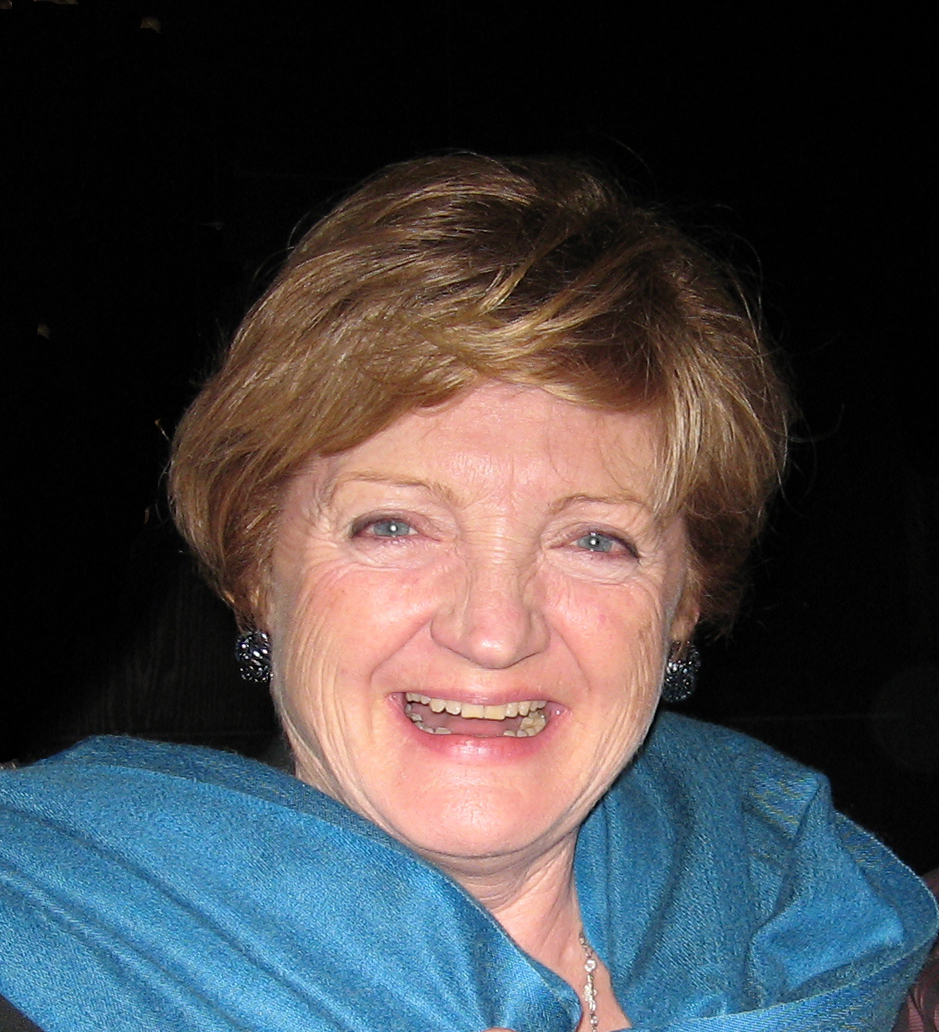
- McKenzie in 2006
- Born: Julia Kathleen Nancy McKenzie; 17 February 1941 (age 85); Enfield, Middlesex, England
- Occupations: Actress; singer; presenter; theatre director, manager and producer
- Years active: 1966–present
- Spouse: Jerry Harte (m. 1971; died 2018)

Julia Kathleen Nancy McKenzie (born 17 February 1941) is an English actress, singer, presenter, and theatre director. She has premièred leading roles written by both Alan Ayckbourn and Stephen Sondheim. On television, she is known for her BAFTA Award nominated role as Hester Fields in the sitcom Fresh Fields (1984–1986) and its sequel French Fields (1989–1991), as Miss Marple in Agatha Christie's Marple (2009–2013) and for her appearance in the BBC One costume drama series Cranford.

McKenzie has also starred in numerous musicals, receiving a 1977 Tony Award nomination for her work in the Broadway revue, Side by Side by Sondheim. A six-time Olivier Award nominee, she has twice won the Olivier Award for Best Actress in a Musical; for the 1982 revival of Guys and Dolls and the 1993 revival of Stephen Sondheim's Sweeney Todd: The Demon Barber of Fleet Street. She also starred in the original London productions of the Sondheim musicals Follies (1987) and Into the Woods (1990). Her film appearances include Bright Young Things (2003) and Notes on a Scandal (2006).

== Early life ==
McKenzie was born on 17 February 1941, in Enfield, Middlesex, England, the daughter of Kathleen Rowe and Albion McKenzie. She attended Tottenham County Grammar School. She trained at the Guildhall School of Music and Drama.

== Career ==
=== Theatre ===
McKenzie's early West End musical credits include Maggie May (1966), Mame (1969), and Company (1971). She appeared in the West End revue Side by Side by Sondheim in 1976, and made her Broadway debut when the show transferred to New York in 1977, receiving a Tony Award nomination for Best Featured Actress in a Musical. She also received a Drama Desk Award nomination. For her role as Miss Adelaide in the 1982 West End revival of Guys and Dolls, she won the first of two Olivier Awards for Best Actress in a Musical.

For her role in the 1986 West End production of the Alan Ayckbourn play Woman in Mind, McKenzie won the Evening Standard Award for Best Actress. She went on to appear in the original West End productions of two Stephen Sondheim musicals, playing Sally in Follies at the Shaftesbury Theatre in 1987, and the Witch in Into the Woods at the Phoenix Theatre in 1990. She continued her association with Sondheim when she starred as Mrs Lovett in the 1993 London revival of Sweeney Todd: The Demon Barber of Fleet Street. The role won her a second Olivier Award in 1994.

McKenzie appeared in a National Theatre 80th birthday tribute to Laurence Olivier, Happy Birthday, Sir Larry, on 31 May 1987 in the presence of Olivier himself.

=== Film and television ===
McKenzie's early television credits include the sitcom Maggie and Her (1978–1979), alongside Irene Handl and That Beryl Marston...! (1981), with Gareth Hunt. She went on to greater popularity with British viewers as Hester in the 1980s sitcom Fresh Fields opposite Anton Rodgers, and its 1990s sequel French Fields, for which she was voted TV Times Favourite Female Comedy Performance for five consecutive years. The role also earned her a 1985 BAFTA nomination for Best Entertainment Performance. She appeared as Mrs Forthby in Blott on the Landscape and as a villager involved in a series of murders in an episode of Midsomer Murders. Film credits include Hotel du Lac (1986), Shirley Valentine (1989), Bright Young Things (2003), These Foolish Things (2006) and Notes on a Scandal (2006).

She was the subject of This Is Your Life in 1981 when she was surprised by Eamonn Andrews outside the Royalty Theatre in London.

In 2007, she was reunited with Anton Rodgers (again as a husband and wife team) in the ITV comedy You Can Choose Your Friends. Also in 2007, she co-starred with Michael Gambon and Judi Dench in the BBC One costume drama series Cranford, playing Mrs Forrester, a military widow of slender means, very attached to her cow Bessie.

In 2008, she was announced as the replacement for Geraldine McEwan as ITV's Miss Marple. She noted: "It's difficult because Agatha Christie wrote her in two ways ... First, very much what Geraldine McEwan played: a slight, rather Victorian creature. Then, a little sturdier and tweedier. I chose the latter. A lot of people say they don't like the tweedier version. But they're both genuine." Also, she said: "Just about everybody in the world knows about Miss Marple and has an opinion of what she should be like, so I’m under no illusions about the size of the task ahead." McKenzie's first series of Marple comprised A Pocket Full of Rye, Murder Is Easy, They Do It with Mirrors and Why Didn't They Ask Evans?. The second series of the show, which aired in 2010, included The Pale Horse, The Secret of Chimneys, The Blue Geranium, and The Mirror Crack'd from Side to Side. A sixth series, including adaptations of A Caribbean Mystery, Greenshaw's Folly and Endless Night, began filming in September 2012 and was broadcast in 2013.

During 2012, she also played the role of Betty Nicholas in the ITV television series The Town.

On 26 December 2013, McKenzie appeared as the title character in the TV film adaptation of David Walliams's book Gangsta Granny. In February 2015, she appeared as Shirley Mollison in the BBC mini series The Casual Vacancy. She played the mother of one of the main protagonists in the 2019 TV series, Gold Digger. She joined an ensemble cast in the film Allelujah, released in March 2023.

=== Other work ===
McKenzie is a radio performer with a long list of credits, including Blithe Spirit, The Country Wife and A Room with a View. As a director she has staged Stepping Out, Peter Pan, Hey, Mr. Producer!, Steel Magnolias, Putting It Together and A Little Night Music. Throughout the early mid 2000s she played Ariadne Oliver in radio adaptations of Agatha Christie novels starring John Moffatt as Hercule Poirot; one such novel was Elephants Can Remember.

She also recorded an audio book of Lewis Carroll's Through the Looking Glass.

McKenzie also lent her voice to several animated works for Martin Gates Productions including three films The Snow Queen, Jack and the Beanstalk and The Snow Queen's Revenge and the TV series Bimble's Buckett. In 2018, she was cast as The Twelve in a Big Finish production The Eighth Doctor – Time War 2 And 4.

In 2012 she appeared in the short film Happy and Glorious, produced by Lisa Osborne for the BBC and directed by Danny Boyle as part of the opening ceremony of the 2012 London Summer Olympics, doubling for Queen Elizabeth II in the scene where Her Majesty boards a helicopter alongside Daniel Craig as James Bond as her escort to the Olympic Stadium.

== Personal life ==
In 1971 McKenzie married American actor-director Jerry Harte. He died in 2018. McKenzie was appointed a Commander of the Order of the British Empire (CBE) in the 2018 New Year Honours for services to drama. She is a critic of fox hunting and was among more than 20 high-profile people who signed a letter to members of parliament in 2015 to oppose Conservative Prime Minister David Cameron's plan to amend the Hunting Act 2004.

== Theatre ==
=== Acting ===
- (London debut) Maggie May, Adelphi Theatre, London, 1966
- Gloria, Mame, Theatre Royal Drury Lane, London, 1969
- Girl in owl coat, Promises, Promises, Prince of Wales Theatre, London, 1970
- April, Company, Her Majesty's Theatre, London, 1971
- Cowardy Custard, Mermaid Theatre, London, 1973
- Cole, Mermaid Theatre, 1974
- (New York debut) Side by Side by Sondheim, Music Box Theatre, New York City, 1977
- The Norman Conquests, 1978
- Ten Times Table, 1979
- Miriam Dervish, Outside Edge, Queen's Theatre, London, 1979
- Lily, On the Twentieth Century, Her Majesty's Theatre, 1980
- Maggie Hobson, Hobson's Choice, Lyric Hammersmith Theatre, London, 1981
- Anna Kopecka, Schweik in the Second World War, National Theatre, London, 1982
- Miss Adelaide, Guys and Dolls, National Theatre, 1982
- Susan, Woman in Mind, Vaudeville Theatre, London, 1986
- Sally Plummer, Follies, Shaftesbury Theatre, London, 1987
- Witch, Into the Woods, Phoenix Theatre, London, 1990
- Mrs Lovett, Sweeney Todd: The Demon Barber of Fleet Street, National Theatre, 1993
- Ruella, Communicating Doors, Gielgud Theatre, London, 1995
- Kafka's Dick, Piccadilly Theatre, London, 1998
- The Royal Family, Theatre Royal Haymarket, London, 2001
- Fuddy Meers, Arts Theatre, London, 2004
- The Philadelphia Story, The Old Vic, London, 2005

=== Directing ===
- Stepping Out, Duke of York's Theatre, London, 1984
- Just So, Watermill Theatre, Newbury, Berkshire, 1989
- Steel Magnolias, Lyric Theatre, London, 1989
- Putting It Together, Manhattan Theatre Club Stage I, New York City, 1993
- Hey, Mr. Producer! The Musical World of Cameron Mackintosh (stage direction, with Bob Avian), Lyceum Theatre, London, 1998
- A Little Night Music, Tokyo, 1999
- Stephen Sondheim's Old Friends, Sondheim Theatre, London, 2023

== Filmography ==
Year	Title	Role	Notes
1973	BBC Show of the Week	Actress	Episode: "The Roy Hudd Family Show"
1973–1974	Frost's Weekly	Various Characters	7 episodes
1973–1979	The Two Ronnies	Wife (uncredited) / Clinic Nurse / Phyllis Barnes / Margaret/Woman in Cinema / Party Hostess / Wife / Dulcie / Emma	8 episodes
1974	2nd House	Actress in Cole	Season 2 Episode 6: "The Juniper Tree"
1975	Dick Deadeye, or Duty Done	Rose Maybud	voice
1976	Battle of the Sexes	Actress	Series regular
1976–1979	Maggie and Her	Poppy / Maggie	Series regular
1977	Your Move	Actress	Season 1 Episode 20: "Episode #1.20"
1979	Ike	Sybil Bryan	Miniseries; Season 1 Episode 1: "Part 1"
1980	The Wildcats of St. Trinian's	Miss Dolly Dormancott	
1981	That Beryl Marston...!	Georgie Bodley	Series regular
1982	Fame Is the Spur	Pen Muff	Miniseries; 6 episodes
1983	Those Glory Glory Days	Mrs. Herrick	TV Movie
1984	Sharing Time	Polly	Season 1 Episode 1: "Guilt on the Gingerbread"
1984–1986	Fresh Fields	Hester Fields	Series regular
1985	Blott on the Landscape	Mrs. Forthby	Miniseries; 6 episodes
1985	Dear Box Number	Betty Wilson	TV Movie
1985	Theatre Night	Diana / Introduction	Season 1 Episode 3: "Absent Friends"
1986	Hotel du Lac	Jennifer Pusey	
1989	Shirley Valentine	Gillian	
1989–1991	French Fields	Hester Fields	Series regular
1992	Screen One	Mrs. Poyser	Season 3 Episode 9: "Adam Bede"
1995	Ghosts	Mrs. Amberson	Season 1 Episode 4: "Shadowy Third"
1995	The Old Curiosity Shop	Mrs. Jarley	TV Movie
1995	The Snow Queen	Grandma, The Old Lady, Freda	voice
1996	Vol-au-vent	Audrey	
1996	The Snow Queen's Revenge	The Snow Queen, Freda and Proprietor	voice
1996–1998	Bimble's Bucket	Dolly Clackhanger/Narrator (voice)	Series regular
1999	Jack and the Beanstalk	Mavis (voice)	Video
2001	Jack and the Beanstalk: The Real Story	Jack's Mum	Miniseries; 2 episodes
2003	The Last Detective	Sheila Harthog	Season 1 Episode 2: "Moonlight"
2003	Bright Young Things	Lottie Crump	
2003	Death in Holy Orders	Margaret Munroe	Miniseries; 2 episodes
2006	These Foolish Things	Miss Abernethy	
2006	Midsomer Murders	Ruby Wilmott	Season 9 Episode 4: "Down Among the Dead Men"
2006	Where the Heart Is	Sylvia Landridge	Season 10 Episode 9: "And on the Way I Dropped It"
2006	Notes on a Scandal	Marjorie	
2007	Celebration	Prue	TV Movie
2007	You Can Choose Your Friends	Margaret Snell	TV Movie
2007	Doctor Who: The Eighth Doctor Adventures	Rachel Zimmerman (voice)	Season 1 Episode 6: "No More Lies"
2007–2009	Cranford	Mrs. Forrester	7 episodes
2008–2013	Miss Marple	Miss Marple	Series regular
2012	The Mystery of Edwin Drood	Mrs. Crisparkle	Miniseries; 2 episodes
2012	The Town	Betty Nicholas	Miniseries; 3 episodes
2013	Doctor Who: The Fourth Doctor Adventures	Florence (voice)	Season 2 Episode 1: "The Auntie Matter"
2013	Gangsta Granny	Granny	TV Movie
2015	The Casual Vacancy	Shirley Mollison	Miniseries; 3 episodes
2018	The Queen and I	Queen Mum	TV Movie
2018–2020	Doctor Who: The Eighth Doctor – Time War	The Twelve (voice)	4 episodes
2019	Gold Digger	Hazel Day	Miniseries; 6 episodes
2022	Allelujah	Mrs. Maudsley	

== Awards and nominations ==
Year	Award	Work	Result
1977	Drama Desk Award for Outstanding Actress in a Musical	Side by Side by Sondheim	Nominated
1977	Tony Award for Best Featured Actress in a Musical	Side by Side by Sondheim	Nominated
1980	Olivier Award for Best Actress in a Musical	On the Twentieth Century	Nominated
1982	Olivier Award for Best Actress in a Musical	Guys and Dolls	Won
1985	BAFTA TV Award for Best Entertainment Performance	Fresh Fields	Nominated
1986	Olivier Award for Best Actress	Woman in Mind	Nominated
1986	Evening Standard Award for Best Actress	Woman in Mind	Won
1987	Olivier Award for Best Actress in a Musical	Follies	Nominated
1991	Olivier Award for Best Actress in a Musical	Into the Woods	Nominated
1993	Olivier Award for Best Actress in a Musical	Sweeney Todd: The Demon Barber of Fleet Street	Won
