= Busy Buses =

Television series

- Created by: Terry Ward
- Written by: Richard Everett; Julie Middleton; Steve Middleton; Camilla McGibbon; Malcolm Doney
- Voices of: Brian Conley (series 1); Gary Martin (series 2); David Holt (series 2)
- Narrated by: Brian Conley (series 1); Gary Martin (series 2)
- Music by: Mark London; Francis Haines
- Opening theme: "Busy Buses" performed by Brian Conley
- Country of origin: United Kingdom
- Original language: English
- No. of series: 2
- No. of episodes: 39

Production
- Executive producer: Malcolm Hayworth
- Producer: Terry Ward
- Running time: 5–25 minutes
- Production company: TV4C

Original release
- Network: Living (Tiny Living)
- Release: 1 February 2002 – 4 August 2005

Busy Buses is a British animated pre-school children's series about the lives of a group of friendly talking buses. The series ran for a total of 39 episodes, each lasting approximately 5 minutes. The first series was created in 2002 and was originally narrated by Brian Conley, who provided voices for all the characters. It was first broadcast on Living TV's Tiny Living morning strand, and in 2005 the ABC in Australia acquired the rights to the series, and a further 13 episodes were produced and aired on ABC for Kids and TV3 in New Zealand.

== Production ==
Busy Buses is a 3D CGI animated television series for children between the ages of three and six. Set in the fictional town of Chumley, it features a bus garage and eight colourful bus characters (Sammy, Stephanie, Harry, Colin, Arnold, Susan, Roger and Penny). Brian Conley narrates the stories, and he has also created the voices for all the Busy Buses (in the first series only) along with its theme tune.

The series was produced by TV4C (a joint venture between Chatsworth Television, and Flicks Films); it was created, directed and produced by Terry Ward.

== Episodes ==
=== Series 1 (2002) ===
No.	Title	Written by
1	"Sammy Meets a Monster"	Richard Everett
Late one night, Sammy decides to take the road that travels through Chumley Park to reach home but comes across something he has never seen before; something big, loud, and alive!
2	"Stephanie and the Queen"	Richard Everett
Stephanie is chosen by Mr. Spector to carry the Queen who shall be arriving in Chumley! However, not everything is as it seems…
3	"Harry Gets Spooked"	Richard Everett
Harry is to take passengers to the 'old ruined castle' but after being fuelled up to head off Harry doesn't realise that he has left his petrol cap open! When it's time to take the passengers back home his fuel tank is of course completely empty, and it's getting dark, and spooky…
4	"Colin Needs a Bath"	Julie Middleton; Steve Middleton
Colin arrives back at the bus shed one day and unfortunately for the other buses' noses – stinks! Sammy however comes up with a clever idea to make Colin clean again – without him even noticing it! This is splendid because as everyone knows, Colin doesn't like to have a bath very often.
5	"Sammy Nearly Takes Off"	Richard Everett
Sammy wishes he could be an airport bus instead of a school bus so he could see an airplane close up. Little does he know that his wish just might come true…
6	"Arnold Gets Lost"	Richard Everett
Arnold doesn't have such a good memory anymore due to his old age. This leads to him making a right pickle of himself one day when he's sure that he's traveling down the right route to his destination.
7	"Stephanie's Bumpy Day"	Richard Everett
The Chumley train system is temporarily out of use and so it's up to Stephanie to help out and save the day by picking up the stranded passengers at the train station. Stephanie however becomes confused and thinks that she, herself, has to drive along the railway line!
8	"Sammy's First Day at School"	Richard Everett
The holidays are over and it's time for Sammy to start the school route again. After all of Sammy's excitement for seeing his children chums again he becomes brainwashed and forgets all his other routes for the day and only remembers when Mr. Spector reminds him – on more than one occasion that is!
9	"Stephanie Gets Soaked"	Malcolm Doney
When Stephanie is having a bath in the coach wash one morning, it breaks down leaving soapsuds all over her. She refuses to move because she simply just wouldn't want to be seen in such a state. Sammy, unexpectedly, solves the dilemma later that day...
10	"Susan Runs Away"	Camilla McGibbon
Susan becomes distracted by an attraction in town and parks to watch but ends up copping a parking ticket for parking where vehicles are not allowed. Susan is upset that all the other buses will give her a hard time about it and that Mr. Spector will be cross. So later, she runs away, into the black of night…
11	"Arnold in a Tight Spot"	Julie Middleton; Steve Middleton
Arnold's poor memory fails him yet again when he thinks that a road he is traveling down is a "shortcut" but instead finds himself wedged under a railway bridge that is too low for a double-decker bus such as himself to pass beneath.
12	"Arnold's Special Passenger"	Malcolm Doney
It's the last day of school before Christmas and everyone is looking really forward to the holidays, well, almost everyone apart from some of the buses who complain that they'll have extra passengers to pull! Later it is learnt Father Christmas will be coming to visit Chumley and soon all spirits are brightened for whom is grumpy. But who will be the bus to carry the jolly old man in red?
13	"Sammy in the Snow"	Richard Everett
Overconfident Sammy thinks that he couldn't possibly get stuck in the snow, but he does now of course doesn't he? But will anyone find him in such a remote spot where he has gotten stuck?
14	"Roger Slips Up"	Richard Everett
Roger gets stuck in some snow at the airport but is lent a helping hand thanks to some rather unlikely circumstances.
15	"Susan Goes Pink"	Richard Everett
Susan wishes people would notice her a bit more. She decides to alter her appearance by going for a "new look" and certainly does get noticed – but for all the wrong reasons!
16	"Arnold's Brother Archie"	Richard Everett
Archie, Arnold's younger brother arrives from London to help out with the work in Chumley. He acts quite a big shot so Sammy encourages Arnold to pay him out.
17	"Sammy Has a Paddle"	Malcolm Doney
After having a big play at the beach, Sammy becomes tired and falls asleep – with the high tide fast approaching behind him!
18	"Roger Meets his Chums"	Malcolm Doney
Roger meets his old bus friends from the war days for a reunion at Chumley Airport.
19	"Arnold Gets a New Coat"	Malcolm Doney
Arnold tries to take a "shortcut" to get home quicker; but the poor old chap's memory fails him once more and ends up smashing into the paint factory!
20	"Frank Comes to Visit"	Julie Middleton; Steve Middleton
A large American tour bus called Frank comes to do a special tourist route for a day in Chumley but is so big that he can barely move along the tight and narrow country lanes!
21	"Stephanie's Bossy Day"	Richard Everett
The buses are relieved that Stephanie will be temporarily leaving Chumley for a while – taking her bossiness with her! But her replacement for the time being, to the other buses' disappointment, turns out to be even bossier!
22	"Sammy Wins the Day"	Malcolm Doney
Sammy cops some cheek from some other bigger and older buses he doesn't know at a school sports day for being little but later proves himself to them thanks to some helpful advice from Roger and Arnold that he was given earlier that day.
23	"Arnold Gets Sick"	Julie Middleton; Steve Middleton
Sammy finds no one at the bus shed one day except for Arnold – who doesn't look right at all! He's dirty, his bonnet is open and his eyes are closed. Sammy becomes very worried and upset at this. What could be wrong?
24	"Mr. Spector's Flowers"	Richard Everett
Sammy overhears Mr. Spector talking on the telephone, and it sounds to him as if he will be having to get rid of some of the Busy Buses!
25	"Sammy and the Wrong Day"	Julie Middleton; Steve Middleton
Sammy rushes out to start his school route for the day. Unfortunately for him, there are no children waiting at the bus stops anywhere!
26	"Sammy the Acrobatic Bus"	Richard Everett
Sammy and Colin accidentally get locked out of the bus shed one night, unknown to Mr. Spector. However, the two friends come up with an ingenious method to get their good night's sleep that they so rightly deserve!

=== Series 2 (2002) ===
1. "Sammy's New Friend" – Sammy is out on the school run when he meets another bus who looks just like him, except in a different colour – and they soon make friends.
2. "The Football Match" – There is a football match between the Chumley buses and the Nettlefidget Rovers buses. Sammy badly wants to play in the annual Chumley football match, but the other buses think he is too young. When Roger starts to break down, he eventually gets his chance.
3. "Busy Bangers" – Mr. Spector mistakenly gives the buses the wrong type of fuel causing all sorts of problems throughout the day.
4. "Sammy the Stunt Bus" – Sammy goes to the airport with Roger, but he gets stuck in a multi-story car park when he sneaks off to watch the planes.
5. "A Day on the Farm" – When the buses are enjoying a nice relaxing Sunday, Farmer Waggle's tractor has broken down, and the buses are called out to help him.
6. "Sammy becomes a Scout" – Sammy takes the local scout group to Nettlefidget Woods on a camping trip. But the road heading to the woods is closed for emergency repair work. But Sammy has other ideas, a random shortcut which includes driving through the river and some fields!
7. "Stephanie Loses her Nerve" – Stephanie is too scared to leave the garage and so the other buses try a plan to help. Meanwhile, Sammy breaks down on Cowslip Down.
8. "A Muddy Day" – It's a rainy day and none of the buses want to go outside; except Colin, who loves the mud.
9. "Sammy Gets Taller" – Sammy is upset that he is shorter than the other buses, and comes up with some odd ways to make himself taller. Meanwhile, Roger gets stuck in a new airport tunnel and Sammy rushes to the rescue.
10. "Sammy's Midnight Adventure" – Tommy comes to visit again and stays over in the garage. He and Sammy sneak out during the night to see the sights of Chumley.
11. "One Eyed Roger" – Roger has had a busy day but needs to make a late night trip to the airport. When one of his headlights goes out on the way, he gets into trouble.
12. "Rick the Racing Bus" – Sammy is going in for a full service and Rick comes to stand in for him, however Rick, his replacement, drives too fast and makes everyone sick.
13. "The Big Parade" – Buses from far and wide come to Chumley to take part in a big bus parade to choose 'Bus of the Year'.

== Broadcast ==
In August 2001, the series was pre-sold to ABC Kids and Nickelodeon Australia.

== Home media ==
=== United Kingdom ===
The show was released on DVD in the United Kingdom by Metrodome Distribution.

- Busy Buses – 17 February 2003
- Sammy's Midnight Adventure – 11 July 2005
- Sammy in the Snow – 17 October 2005
- Sammy Wins The Day – 7 November 2005

=== Australia ===
The series was released in Australia on DVD by ABC Video/Roadshow.

- Colin Needs a Bath - 8 July 2002
- Sammy the Acrobatic Bus - 5 August 2002
- Sammy's New Friend - 11 August 2003
- The Series: 26 Episodes. – 2 May 2003
- Series 2: 13 Episodes. – 7 October 2005

== Reception ==
Vicki Englund of The Courier-Mail praised the television series, writing, "The computer animation is effective and is combined with static cut-out figures of the humans."
