= Prisoner Zero (TV series) =

Australian animated children's TV series

- Genre: Science fiction
- Created by: Jason Haigh-Ellery; Austen Atkinson
- Voices of: Daniel Brocklebank; Danny Carmel; Toby Longworth; Katharine Mangold; John Schwab; Sophie Wu; Gary Martin
- Composer: Andy Sturmer
- Countries of origin: Australia; United Kingdom; Ireland
- Original language: English
- No. of seasons: 1
- No. of episodes: 26

Production
- Executive producer: Gary Russell
- Producer: Josh Campbell
- Production companies: Planet 55 Studios; Telegael Teoranta; Bramall Productions

Original release
- Network: ABC3
- Release: 19 September – 14 October 2016

Prisoner Zero is an Australian animated children's sci-fi, action-adventure series produced by Planet 55 Studios, part of the Big Finish group of companies. Prisoner Zero follows the adventures of Tag, Gem and Del and their mysterious friend Prisoner Zero. These four friends have a mission to free those enslaved across the cosmos from the evil Imperium, led by General Vykar.

== Premise ==
The series follows two teen heroes, Tag and Gem, with their friend, the title character Prisoner Zero. They must stop the Imperium, who have enslaved humanity through a digital system, the Bioweve, by freeing the population and stop the evil General Vykar.

== Characters ==
Prisoner Zero: a mysterious man who is the friend of Tag, Gem, and Del. His memory has been wiped by the Imperium, perhaps multiple times. Voiced by Alexander Vlahos.

Del Rev: a slightly reckless rebel who is married to Bowi. Voiced by John Schwab. In a previous incarnation, executive produced by Austen Atkinson, Robert Firth portrayed Del Rev in 4 episodes. He was unavailable for the reboot.

Gem Coll: a feisty 14-year-old girl who stole the ship Rogue from Cav Anaton. Her parents died when she was young, and she thinks of Del and Bowi as her dads.

Tag Anaton: a 14-year-old boy who is initially reluctant to join the crew of the Rogue. He is the son of a prominent Imperium family and often acts like a spoiled brat, but his hacking genius has helped the crew on multiple occasions.

Guardian: an android (not a robot) programmed to protect Tag Anaton. Later he was integrated with the Rogue's AI system.

Librarian: an 8-foot-tall blue alien wizard that lives in the bowels of the ship. Although he develops a close friendship with Zero, he has secrets and motives of his own. Voiced by Gary Martin.

General Rakshiff Vykar: the main series villain. He seeks ultimate power and is willing to destroy anyone who gets in his way.

== Episodes ==
| No. | Title | Directed by | Written by | Original release date |
|---|---|---|---|---|
| 1 | "Rogue: Part One" | Sean Zwan | Gary Russell | 19 September 2016 |
The spaceship Rogue is under attack from the Imperium forces led by General Vykar. Zero, Gem, Del and Bowi must find a way to escape, but the only solution may lie with an Imperium cadet called Tag Anaton...
| 2 | "Rogue: Part Two" | Sean Zwan | Gary Russell | 20 September 2016 |
Can Zero save the inhabitants of the planet Arkadia from Vykar's deadly scheme? Aboard Rogue, Gem and Del realise they have been boarded, first by Kai and then by Tag and his powerful android, Guardian.
| 3 | "Toybox" | David Breen | Gary Russell | 21 September 2016 |
Zero, Gem, Tag and Guardian explore the depths of the Rogue, unaware that something alien is watching their every move and setting traps for them. What terrible secret does the creature bring from the Dark Times?
| 4 | "Changes: Part One" | Sean Zwan | Gary Russell & Josh Campbell | 22 September 2016 |
Guardian's new body causes him to go alarmingly wild, Jumping himself and Zero down to the planet Kantria and setting Zero up to fight with Vykar, one on one, until one of them is defeated...
| 5 | "Changes: Part Two" | Sean Zwan | Gary Russell & Josh Campbell | 23 September 2016 |
As Zero and Vykar face off against one another, Del must rescue Gem from the ancient cryotubes and Tag has to make a decision as to whose side he is really on - as does Guardian. But who will they choose?
| 6 | "Librarian" | Christian Barkel | Justin Richards | 24 September 2016 |
Lured into the Demon Sector and attacked by the metal-eating Scavengers, the Rogue is on the edge of destruction when help arrives in the shape of an old blue alien wizard who calls himself Librarian...
| 7 | "Enigpath" | Josh Campbell | Scott Handcock | 25 September 2016 |
On the planet Hallaval, Vykar steals an ancient relic he believes will give him ultimate power. But the relic is a living creature with plans of its own. Zero must team up with the Vagabonds to help stop Vykar!
| 8 | "Schism" | Sean Zwan & David Breen | Joseph Lidster | 26 September 2016 |
Kai travels back in time to change the past. Zero follows her and finds himself on a very different Rogue in an alternative timeline created by Kai's meddling and meets a young cadet called Tag Anaton...
| 9 | "Trust" | Josh Campbell | Rebecca Stevens | 27 September 2016 |
Gem has been kidnapped by Barqel and taken to the planet Destrii. While the Rogue crew attempt to rescue her, Gem is overjoyed to find herself back with her parents who tell her she's been asleep for ten years...
| 10 | "Ragnabook: Part One" | Josh Campbell | Scott Handcock | 28 September 2016 |
Rogue has been invaded by the Ragnabook, a monster from the Dark Times capable of rewriting time. It decides the crew's histories need changing, so Gem and Tag must race through the ship to escape...
| 11 | "Ragnabook: Part Two" | Josh Campbell & Derek Moore | Scott Handcock | 29 September 2016 |
Gem and Tag need access to the Forbidden Section of the Library to try and rescue Zero, trapped in Librarian's past. Librarian himself is no help as his memories have been erased by the Ragnabook...
| 12 | "Alchemy" | Derek Moore | Richard Hansom | 30 September 2016 |
The Vagabonds are having a huge party, and the Rogue crew are their special guests. But things take a bad turn when a starship is brought to Hallaval that turns everything into living, mindless gold!
| 13 | "Mother" | David Devjak | David Breen, Rachel Marriott & Colin Bennett | 1 October 2016 |
Deep within the darkest areas of the Rogue is an abandoned science complex, built thousands of years ago. As Zero, Gem and Tag go exploring, they awaken something alien, something that blames them for murder...
| 14 | "Corsairs" | Sean Zwan | David Breen & Mark B. Oliver | 2 October 2016 |
Del tells everyone that they're going to have a day off from being chased by Vykar, facing the Dark Times etc. What can go wrong? Well, how about some space pirates decide there's treasure aboard the Rogue...
| 15 | "Crios: Part One" | Sean Zwan | David Breen | 3 October 2016 |
When a man called Parker contacts the Rogue and says he has a method of stopping the Imperium, Zero agrees to meet him. Del is convinced it's a trap and when Vykar shows up, it seems he's right...
| 16 | "Crios: Part Two" | Sean Zwan | David Breen | 4 October 2016 |
Parker needs something from Zero's brain and will stop at nothing to get it. Meanwhile Gem, Tag and Librarian have discovered that crystal dragons live beneath Crios and must avoid waking them up...
| 17 | "History" | Derek Moore | Richard Hansom | 5 October 2016 |
Someone has kidnapped Vykar and is trying to get secrets from deep within his mind. Realising Vykar holds the key to his own lost past, Zero must undertake a dangerous mission to rescue his old enemy.
| 18 | "Tartarus" | Lachlan Pini | Gary Russell | 6 October 2016 |
Zero has been kidnapped and taken back to the planet Tartarus, the prison Gem rescued him from. A prisoner once again, Zero must piece together his past before his cruel jailer delivers him to a worse fate...
| 19 | "Breakout" | Lachlan Pini | Rebecca Stevens | 7 October 2016 |
Tag's mum sends him an urgent message that takes the Rogue to the prison world Calzarat. There the prisoners, including Tag's dad, are being used by the cruel Doctor Mendez in her dark experiments on their minds.
| 20 | "The Lost" | Josh Campbell | Scott Handcock | 8 October 2016 |
Tag and Gem infiltrate the Imperium's Academy to find out why children are disappearing. Gem joins the Imperium, while Tag finds himself a slave on the Moon of Magog where he makes a new friend, Mike Tarrant.
| 21 | "Choices" | Josh Campbell | Josh Campbell | 9 October 2016 |
The Imperium unveil their new upgrade device, the space-station Oroborous and its android commander, Primis. Just touching any Imperium tech enslaves the mind, as one of the Rogue's crew discovers to their cost...
| 22 | "Traitor" | David Devjak | Joseph Lidster | 10 October 2016 |
The Rogue crew are visited by Cav Anaton, Tag's dad. Cav claims the Rogue is his ship and has to prove to Tag that everything the teen has experienced over the past few months has been a holographic Imperium test!
| 23 | "Weapon" | David Devjak | Gary Russell & Mark B. Oliver | 11 October 2016 |
Gem accidentally activates a living weapon from the Dark Times hidden deep within Rogue. The Weapon takes her over and she begins destroying the ship. Mike meanwhile has started a rebellion on the Moon of Magog.
| 24 | "Dosk" | Sean Zwan | Richard Hansom | 12 October 2016 |
Vykar angers the Faculty in his quest for power, and they send the Imperium fleet to destroy the Spire. As Vykar heads for the mysterious planet Dosk, Barqel asks the Rogue for help - but Zero and Dosk have history.
| 25 | "The Codec: Part One" | Sean Zwan & Derek Moore | Scott Handcock | 13 October 2016 |
The Zero Rebellion is underway, but Zero himself realises that needs to get to Dosk and confront his past, despite knowing that Vykar is already there, and has the control of the mysterious Codec flame!
| 26 | "The Codec: Part Two" | Sean Zwan & Christian Barkel | Gary Russell | 14 October 2016 |
Zero knows the only way to stop Vykar is to merge with the Codec and fight, despite the devastating effect this has on the planet Dosk, as well as Gem, Del and everyone else connected to the Bioweve...

== Production ==
The series was first pitched to the ABC in 2012 as a replacement for Star Wars: The Clone Wars. The show would be the first to have its animation entirely produced in Australia. The show's storytelling was influenced by a mix of traditional western storytelling like Avatar: The Last Airbender and Doctor Who, with the animation style influenced by Japanese anime. Gary Russell served as the executive producer and lead writer with Josh Campbell as series producer and director.

Although no information regarding a second series has been released, the series finale as well as comments by Campbell imply that one was at least planned at some point.

== DVD release ==
The first DVD "Rogue" was released as a Region 4 single disc on 2 November 2016 by ABC in Australia. The second release "History" was released as a Region 4 single disc on 1 February 2017 by ABC in Australia. The third release "The Codec" was released as a Region 4 single disc on 7 June 2017 by ABC in Australia.

== See also ==
- List of Australian television series
