= Annette Ekblom =

English actress

- Born: 1956 (age 69–70); New Brighton, Wirral, Cheshire, England
- Occupation: Actress
- Spouse: Alun Lewis (divorced)
- Children: Amelia Warner

Annette Kate Ekblom (born 1956) is an English actress of Swedish descent. She is the mother of composer Amelia Warner.

Ekblom starred as Linda in Willy Russell's musical Blood Brothers when Bill Kenwright's production opened in London in 1988. She can also be heard on the 1988 revival cast recording with Kiki Dee. Ekblom played the role of family matriarch Debbie Gordon in the Channel 4 television soap opera Brookside in 32 episodes from 2002 to 2003.

== Filmography ==
- Noah’s Castle – TV series, 1979
- Shoestring – TV series, 1979
- God's Wonderful Railway – Marjorie Grant, BBC children's drama series (3 episodes), 1980
- Going Out – 1981
- Blood Brothers – Linda, musical, 1988
- Coronation Street – 1992–1994
- Cracker – Diane, TV series, 1995
- The Wild House – Mother, BBC TV Sitcom, 1996
- Fever Pitch – Robert's Mother, 1997
- The Broker's Man – Sally Griffin, BBC drama series, 1997–1998
- Peak Practice – Patricia Davey, ITV drama series (6 episodes), 1999
- Doctors – Brenda Taylor, "Rub of the Green", 2000
- Inspector Morse – Mrs. Holmes, S8E5: "The Remorseful Day", 2000
- Take Me – Lauren, UK TV mini-series, 2001
- Brookside – Debbie Gordon, 32 episodes, 2002–2003
- Holby City – BBC drama series, 7 episodes, 2004–2009
- Wallander – BBC programme, S3E3:"Before The Frost", 2012
- Unforgivable – Sheila Mitchell, BBC television film, 2025
