= Arthur's Dyke =

2001 film by Gerry Poulson

- DVD cover
- Directed by: Gerry Poulson
- Written by: Robb Stringle
- Produced by: Ron Bareham Steve Sheen
- Starring: Pauline Quirke; Robert Daws; Nicholas Farrell; Richard Graham; Brian Conley; Dennis Waterman; Warren Clarke; Rebecca Lacey
- Edited by: Paddy Payne
- Music by: Stephen W Parsons
- Production company: Quirky Films
- Distributed by: Vine International
- Release date: 2001
- Running time: 103 minutes
- Country: United Kingdom
- Language: English

Arthur's Dyke is a 2001 British film directed by Gerry Poulson and starring Pauline Quirke and Brian Conley. The plot follows a group of ramblers as they attempt to recreate their conquest of the Offa's Dyke path 20 years earlier.

== Premise ==
The film begins with a flashback to 20 years earlier, with four friends celebrating after completing the Offa's Dyke walk, from Chepstow to Prestatyn.
