= Brian Conley =

English actor, comedian (b. 1961)

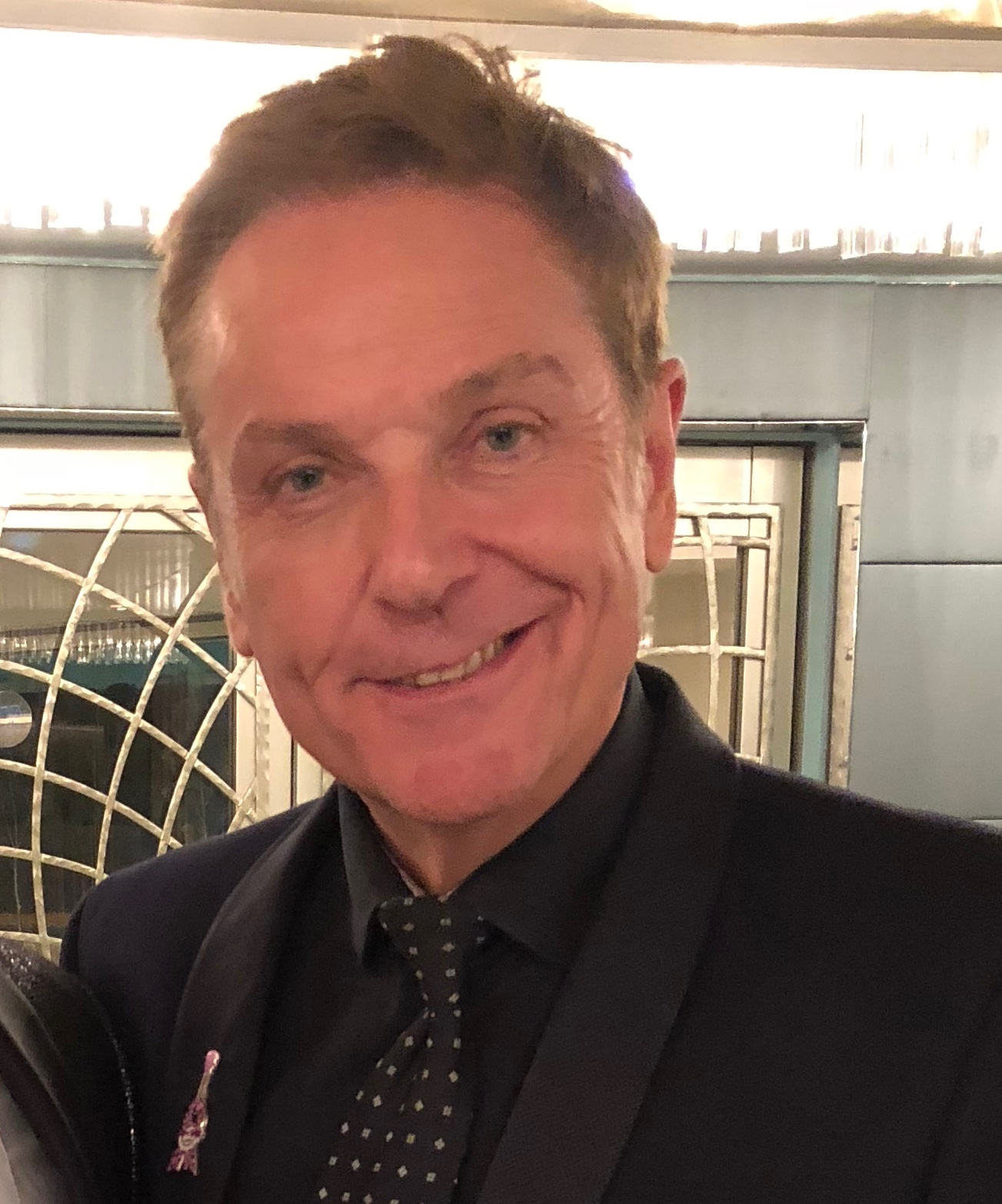
- Conley in 2018
- Born: Brian Paul Conley; 7 August 1961 (age 65); Paddington, London, England
- Occupations: Actor; comedian; singer
- Years active: 1977–present
- Height: 5 ft 9 in (1.75 m)
- Spouse: Anne-Marie Conley (m. 1996)
- Children: 2
- Website: www.brianconley.com

Brian Paul Conley (born 7 August 1961) is an English actor, comedian, singer and television presenter. Conley has been the host of The Brian Conley Show, as well as presenting the Royal Variety Performance on eight occasions. In his 40+-year television career, he has starred in award-winning television sitcoms including Time After Time and The Grimleys.

In the West End, he has played the lead role in musicals such as Me and My Girl, Chitty Chitty Bang Bang, Hairspray, Oliver!, The Music Man, and Barnum. In 1995, He played Al Jolson in the musical Jolson at the Victoria Palace Theatre, which went on to win the prestigious award of Best New Musical at the 1996 Laurence Olivier Awards, and Conley himself was nominated for Laurence Olivier Award for Best Actor in a Musical.

As a musician, he has released five albums, including Brian Conley Sings, Let the Good Times Roll, and Stage to Stage. He has won numerous awards in his career, including The National Television Award for Most Popular Comedy Performer, Best Live Performer in Manchester Evening News and a British Comedy Award.

From 2021 to 2023, Conley appeared as Tom "Rocky" Cotton in the BBC soap opera EastEnders. He returned for one episode that aired on 17 April 2025 as part of the departure storyline for Sonia Fowler (Natalie Cassidy).

== Early life ==
Conley was born on 7 August 1961 in Paddington, London. His father, Colin, was a taxi driver, later working for the BBC in production as a prop man, including for BBC outside broadcast units. His brother, Alan, is a BBC floor manager, including for Strictly Come Dancing. Conley was brought up in Kilburn, North West London, and studied Performing Arts at the Barbara Speake Stage School. As a teenager, Conley had a few minor television appearances, including a commercial for hot dogs and a small role in a 1977 episode of the science fiction series Survivors. At the age of 16, by lying about his age, Conley started work as a Pontin's Bluecoat.

== Career ==
Conley's first major showbusiness success was fronting a comedy showband called Tomfoolery, who performed in pubs and clubs across England and Wales, sometimes as a support act for artists such as Johnny Mathis and the Nolans. The group broke up due to internal disputes when Conley was 19, but his work with the band led to his being talent spotted by agent Bob Voice. As a result of this, Conley started working as a warm-up man for television personalities such as the Krankies, Kenny Everett and Terry Wogan.

Conley's career was then advanced by TVS casting director Bill Hatterley, who secured him on-screen appearances in comedy shows such as Make Me Laugh (1982), The Laughter Show (1984–1985), Live from Her Majesty's (1984–87) and Five Alive (1987).

In 1989, with the support of London Weekend Television (LWT)'s light entertainment controller, Conley starred in his own comedy sketch show, Brian Conley: This Way Up. After two series of the show, Conley made his first appearance in the West End, playing the lead role of Bill Snibson in a production of Me and My Girl.

In 1992, LWT offered him another opportunity to star in his own comedy programme, with The Brian Conley Show. At the suggestion of producer and director Nigel Lythgoe, this new vehicle had a variety format rather than being purely sketches. This proved popular, and the show became Britain's most-watched light-entertainment programme of its time. Conley's next success was a sitcom entitled Time After Time, in which he played the lead role of reformed criminal Kenny Conway; the show was named Best ITV Sitcom at the 1994 British Comedy Awards.

In 1995, He played Al Jolson in the musical Jolson at the Victoria Palace Theatre, which went on to win the prestigious award of Best New Musical at the 1996 Laurence Olivier Awards, and Conley himself was nominated for Laurence Olivier Award for Best Actor in a Musical.

On 7 November 2012, ITV confirmed that Conley would feature in the 2012 series of I'm a Celebrity...Get Me Out of Here!. On 19 November 2012, Brian left the jungle on medical grounds.

On 18 August 2017, it was announced that Conley would be taking part in the fifteenth series of Strictly Come Dancing. He was partnered with Welsh professional dancer Amy Dowden. Conley and Dowden were voted off the show in Week 5 after their Jive to Tom Jones' "It's Not Unusual".

In February 2021, it was announced that he would be joining the BBC soap opera EastEnders as series regular Terry Cant, the long-lost father of established character Sonia Fowler (Natalie Cassidy). However, it was later revealed that his character was not Terry Cant and was in fact Tom "Rocky" Cotton. In September 2023, Conley confirmed that he had decided to leave EastEnders.

He spoke at length about his exit from Albert Square during his appearance on award-winning motoring podcast Fuelling Around. Conley was on the show to talk about motoring, one of his biggest passions away from the stage and screen.

In December 2024, Conley starred as Billy Barnum at the Bristol Hippodrome's pantomime production of Goldilocks and the Three Bears.

== Film, television and theatre credits ==
=== Television ===
==== As title star ====
- Brian Conley: This Way Up (1989–90)
- The Brian Conley Show (1992–95)
- Brian Conley: Alive and Dangerous (1996)
- Brian Conley's Crazy Christmas (1997)
- The Brian Conley Show (2000–02)
- An Audience with... (2002)

==== As actor ====
- Survivors (1977) – as Michael, episode 'The Peacemakers'
- Time After Time (1994–95) – as Kenny Conway
- The Grimleys (1999–2000) – as Doug 'Dynamo' Digby
- Busy Buses (2002) – as the Narrator and Characters
- The Life and Times of Vivienne Vyle (2007) – as Chris Connor
- Last of the Summer Wine (2008) – as Boothroyd, episode 'Enter the Finger'
- EastEnders (2021–2023, 2025) – as Tom "Rocky" Cotton

=== Film ===
- Circus (2000) – as Bruno
- Arthur's Dyke (2001) – as Dave
- Equilibrium (2002) – as Reading Room Overseer

=== Theatre ===
- Me and My Girl (as Bill Snibson), Adelphi Theatre, 1991
- Jolson (as Al Jolson), Victoria Palace Theatre, 1995–98
- Chitty Chitty Bang Bang (as Caractacus Potts), London Palladium, 2005, Palace Theatre, Manchester and Birmingham Hippodrome, 2006
- The Music Man (as Professor Harold Hill), Chichester Festival Theatre, 2008
- Hairspray (as Edna Turnblad), Shaftesbury Theatre, 2009–10 and UK tour, 2010
- Brother Love's Travelling Salvation Show (as Brother Love), UK tour, 2011
- Oliver! (as Fagin), UK tour, 2012
- Barnum (as P.T. Barnum), UK Tour, 2014–15
- 9 to 5 (as Franklin Hart Jr), Savoy Theatre, 2019–20
- A Christmas Carol (as Ebenezer Scrooge), Dominion Theatre 2020
- Back to the Future: The Musical (as Doc Brown), Adelphi Theatre, 2025, Milton Keynes Theatre, 2027

== Discography ==
- Sings (Columbia, 1993 and 2002)
- Stage to Stage (Telstar Records, 1996)
- Songs from the Shows (Music Digital, 2002)
- Brian Conley Sings (Sony, 2002)
- Let the Good Times Roll (Universal, 2002)

== Awards and nominations ==
Wins

- 1995 National Television Awards, Most Popular Comedy Performer
- 2004 Manchester Evening News Theatre Awards, Most Popular Performer
- 2008 TMA Best Performance in a Musical Award for The Music Man

Nominations

- 1996 Laurence Olivier Award for Best Actor in a Musical for Jolson
- 2000 National Television Awards, Most Popular Comedy Performer
