= Gunlok =

2000 video game

- Developer(s): Rebellion Developments
- Publisher(s): Virgin Interactive
- Platform(s): Microsoft Windows
- Release: EU: 8 December 2000; NA: 30 April 2001
- Genre(s): Action-adventure

Gunlok is a squad-based action-adventure real-time strategy video game developed by Rebellion Developments, originally released in 2000 for Microsoft Windows. It was re-released in 2009 on GamersGate.

== Plot ==
Set in a post apocalyptic earth, robots have almost completely wiped out mankind. However, a few pockets of human resistance fight on. Gunlok, a warrior in modular power armor powered by energy from Earth's core, fights on. As a member of Earth's elite Special Forces, Gunlok leads a campaign against the massive robot army.

== Reception ==
Reception

Review scores
Publication	Score
Edge	5/10
Gamekult	5/10
GameSpot	6.2/10
GameStar	74%
Jeuxvideo.com	16/20
PC Gamer (UK)	67%
PC Games (DE)	75%
PC Zone	60%

The game received mixed reviews. GameSpot's Scott Osborne praised the game's controls and interface, but criticized the plot and graphics.
