= Team Apache =

1998 video game

- Developer(s): Simis
- Publisher(s): Mindscape Group
- Platform(s): Microsoft Windows
- Release: June 24, 1998
- Genre(s): Flight simulator
- Mode(s): Single player, multiplayer

Team Apache is an attack helicopter flight simulator developed by Simis and published by Mindscape. Team Apache is mostly about commanding a group of six AH-64 Apache US Army crews in battles against Communist FARC insurgents in Colombia and the Russian military in Latvia.

== Development ==
Team Apache was developed by Simis, whose founders led a management buyout of the developer from Eidos Interactive during development. Mindscape later purchased the publishing rights.

== Gameplay ==
Team Apache is an intricate video game characterized by its focus on the principles of command, tactics, and battlefield authenticity. The player assumes a managerial role, supervising unit morale, supply logistics, maintenance procedures, and strategic planning undertaken prior to mission deployment.

The game utilizes a combination of manual instructions and a daily newspaper system to provide players with the geopolitical context behind the depicted wars, accentuating the emphasis on realism. Detailed, military-style situation reports are employed to offer a comprehensive overview of the tactical environment, ensuring a complete understanding of the battlefield situation.

During the game's progress, ground forces engage in realistic deployments and movements, accurately replicating the dynamics of a theatre of conflict.

Team Apache offers diverse gameplay modes. It includes a multiplayer mode that allows players to collaborate or compete with others. The game is equipped with a mission building application, enabling players to design and execute their own missions, thereby enriching the user's engagement with the game's strategic elements.

== Plot ==
The player commands six AH-64 Apache crews of the US Army in battles against the Communist FARC insurgents in Colombia and the Russian military in Latvia. The storyline is developed through FMV sequences, in-mission briefings and newspaper articles.

=== Colombian Campaign ===
In 1998, the Fuerzas Armadas Revolucionarias de Colombia–Ejército del Pueblo or FARC-EP (Spanish for "Revolutionary Armed Forces of Colombia–People's Army") staged a large-scale guerrilla offensive against the government of Colombia. In its wake comes a wave of kidnappings and assassinations of high-ranking officials and their families. The corrupt and inefficient military of Colombia and police cannot hold their own against the insurgents, and need help from the United States. The United States needs to safeguard Colombia's oil industry and eliminate FARC's illegal cocaine industry.

== See also ==
- Comanche – series of war simulation games
