= Lisa Coleman (actress) =

English actress (born 1970)

- Born: Lisa Jacqueline Coleman; 10 July 1970 (age 56); Westminster, Greater London, England
- Education: Anna Scher Theatre; Open University (BSc, MA)
- Occupation: Actress
- Years active: 1977–present
- Television: The Story of Tracy Beaker (2002–2006); Tracy Beaker: The Movie of Me (2004); Tracy Beaker Returns (2010–2012); Tracy Beaker Survival Files (2011–2012); My Mum Tracy Beaker (2021); The Beaker Girls (2021–2023)
- Parents: Francis Coleman (father); Ann Beach (mother)
- Relatives: Charlotte Coleman (sister)

Lisa Jacqueline Coleman (born 10 July 1970) is an English actress who began her career as a child actress. The younger daughter of Francis Coleman and Ann Beach, she is best known for her role as Camilla "Cam" Lawson in The Story of Tracy Beaker (2002–2006), Tracy Beaker: The Movie of Me (2004), Tracy Beaker Returns (2010–2012), Tracy Beaker Survival Files (2011–2012), My Mum Tracy Beaker (2021), and The Beaker Girls (2021–2023).

== Early life and education ==
Lisa Jacqueline Coleman was born on 10 July 1970 at Charing Cross Hospital in Strand, London. She was the younger of two daughters born to Francis Coleman, a Canadian television producer, and his wife, Ann Beach, a British actress. Her elder sister, Charlotte Coleman, also pursued a career as an actress. Her father was born in Montreal to an Irish father and a French mother. She was raised in the Muswell Hill area of North London.

=== Education ===
Coleman began her training in the performing arts at age six by attending the Anna Scher Theatre in Islington. Later in life, she expanded her academic credentials by earning a Bachelor of Science (BSc) degree in Psychology from the Open University, qualifying as a teacher of adult dyslexic learners, and obtaining a Master of Arts (MA) degree in special education.

== Career ==
=== Early work and breakthrough (1977–1997) ===
Coleman began her professional acting career at the age of six. After training at the Anna Scher Theatre, she secured her first television role as Leonie Klein in the ITV courtroom drama series Crown Court (1977). Her first feature film appearance followed in 1981 with a minor role in the heist film Loophole. Prior to entering full-time professional acting, she spent a gap year in Botswana teaching English.

Throughout the 1980s and early 1990s, she worked steadily as a young actress, appearing in projects like Play for Today (1980) and the miniseries Travellers by Night (1985), alongside guest appearances in established British series including EastEnders, The Bill, Press Gang, and the comedy series Bottom. In 1993, she played Elisa in the BBC's four-part television serial adaptation of Scarlet and Black. Alongside her acting, she worked as a life model during this period. In 1993, she sat for the prominent British artist Euan Uglow, posing nude for his oil painting Articulation. She also performed as a vocalist in the funk band The Hot Heads.

Her breakthrough acting role came in 1994 when she joined the main cast of the BBC medical drama Casualty as Jude Korcanik. Coleman portrayed the character across three series, appearing in 70 episodes before her character was written out of the series in 1997. Prior to her casting as a series regular, she had previously appeared in Casualty during its fifth series in 1990, playing a minor, one-off character named Sharon Dobbs.

=== Television prominence, stage roles, and the Tracy Beaker franchise (2002–present) ===
Following her departure from Casualty, Coleman maintained a regular presence on British television. She secured recurring roles as Sarah May in Undercover Heart (1998), Sharon Willett in the ITV medical drama Peak Practice (1998–1999), and as Angela Baker in the children's television series Home Farm Twins (1999–2000). From September 2000 to October 2001, she returned to the stage, portraying Imogen in the Show of Strength Theatre Company's production of Peter Nichols' play So Long Life at the Tobacco Factory in Bristol.

In 2002, Coleman landed the role of Camilla "Cam" Lawson in the CBBC series The Story of Tracy Beaker, a television adaptation of the novel of the same name by Jacqueline Wilson. Her character—a struggling writer who becomes the foster mother and eventual adoptive mother of the title character—became a central figure in the franchise. She played the role until the original series concluded in 2005.

During her tenure with the franchise, she starred in the television feature film spin-off, Tracy Beaker: The Movie of Me, which broadcast on BBC One in February 2004. Coleman subsequently reprised the character across multiple spin-off iterations over the next two decades, including Tracy Beaker Returns (2010–2012) and the documentary-style companion series Tracy Beaker Survival Files (2011–2012). She later returned to the role for the sequel series My Mum Tracy Beaker (2021) and The Beaker Girls (2021–2023).

Alongside her franchise work, Coleman continued to accept guest roles on mainstream television, with appearances in Hollyoaks (as Morag), French and Saunders, and the BBC period drama Call the Midwife (2025).

=== Voice and audio work ===
Parallel to her screen career, Coleman developed an extensive career in audio work. She has narrated over 50 audiobooks for major publishers, spanning fiction, non-fiction, and children's literature. She has also performed widely in audio dramas for BBC Radio 4, notably portraying the recurring character Eli in the comedy series Ed Reardon's Week starting in 2005, alongside roles in plays such as A Far Cry from Kensington and No Commitments.

== Personal life ==
Coleman maintained a close relationship with her elder sister, actress Charlotte Coleman, and frequently rejected media narratives of professional rivalry between them. She has also rejected media narratives of nepotism. Following the sudden death of her sister, the Coleman family established the Charlotte Coleman Scholarship Award at the Anna Scher Theatre to support aspiring actors from underprivileged backgrounds.

Coleman relocated from London to Bristol, describing the move as a preference for a more community-oriented environment. Prior to this, her living arrangements included periods residing in housing co-operatives and squats. She has volunteered as an occupational therapist in a psychiatric unit.

== Filmography ==
Year	Title	Role	Notes	Ref.
1977	Crown Court	Leonie Klein	2 episodes	
1980	Play for Today	Zoe Clements	Episode: "A Walk in the Forest"	
1981	Loophole	Daniels' Daughter		
1981	BBC2 Playhouse	Jennifer	3 episodes	
1985	Travellers by Night	Belle	6 episodes	
1990	London's Burning	Nurse	Episode: "Episode #3.6"	
1990, 1994–1997	Casualty	Sharon Dobbs, Jude Korcanik	71 episodes	
1991	ScreenPlay	Jesse Dealing	Episode: "Redemption"	
1991	The Hottest Day of the Year	Maja the dream girl	Television film	
1992	A Fatal Inversion	Office Girl	Episode: "Episode #1.3"	
1992	Absolutely Fabulous	Joanna	Episode: "ISO Tank"	
1993	The Chief	Jo	Episode: "Episode #3.5"	
1993	Press Gang	Phillipa Prescott	Episode: "Food, Love and Insecurity"	
1993	Scarlet and Black	Elisa	2 episodes	
1993, 1996	French and Saunders	Shirley, Lisa	2 episodes	
1993, 2000	The Bill	Lisa Carpenter, Gayle Tyler	2 episodes	
1994	Scene	Veronica	Episode: "SAB"	
1995	Bottom	Doreen	Episode: "Terror"	
1996	Vol-au-vent	Christine		
1996	Live & Kicking	Herself	Episode: "Episode #3.30"	
1997–1999	Call My Bluff	Herself	5 episodes	
1997, 1999	The Scoop	Herself, Reporter	17 episodes	
1998	Undercover Heart	Sarah May	5 episodes	
1998	Joint Venture	Angel	Short film	
1998	Casualty 250	Herself	Television special	
1999–2000	Home Farm Twins	Angela Baker	Shorts	
2000	Peak Practice	Sharon Willett	Episode: "Ghosts"	
2000, 2002–2003	Cutting Edge	Narrator	5 episodes	
2001	McCready and Daughter	Andie Bennett	Episode: "No Bed of Roses"	
2002–2006	The Story of Tracy Beaker	Cam Lawson	56 episodes	
2002	EastEnders: Perfectly Frank	Teri Phillips	Television special	
2002	The Great Reality TV Swindle	Narrator	Television special	
2004	Tracy Beaker: The Movie of Me	Cam Lawson	Television film	
2009	Virtuality	Singer		
2010–2012	Tracy Beaker Returns	Cam Lawson	23 episodes	
2011	Hollyoaks	Morag Fairhurst	4 episodes	
2011–2012	Tracy Beaker Survival Files	Cam Lawson	2 episodes	
2012	More Sex Please, We're British	Narrator	Television special	
2020	It Snows in Benidorm	Mujer Despedida Soltera 1		
2021	My Mum Tracy Beaker	Cam Lawson	3 episodes	
2021–2023	The Beaker Girls	Cam Lawson	8 episodes	
2022	12th Annual Guild of Music Supervisors Awards	Herself, Presenter	Television special	
2023	Trevor	Wendy		
2024	Bottom: Exposed	Herself	Television film	
2025	Cope	Dr Fletcher	Short film	
2025	Call The Midwife	Miss Jenkins	Episode: "Episode #14.3"	
