= Fresh Fields =

British TV sitcom (1984–1986)

- Genre: Sitcom
- Written by: John Chapman
- Directed by: Peter Frazer-Jones
- Starring: Julia McKenzie; Anton Rodgers; Ann Beach; Fanny Rowe; Ballard Berkeley; Debby Cumming; Daphne Oxenford; Philip Bird; John Arthur
- Country of origin: United Kingdom
- Original language: English
- No. of series: 4
- No. of episodes: 27

Production
- Producer: Peter Frazer-Jones
- Running time: 30 minutes (including commercials)
- Production company: Thames Television

Original release
- Network: ITV
- Release: 7 March 1984 – 23 October 1986

Related
- French Fields

Fresh Fields is a British sitcom starring Julia McKenzie and Anton Rodgers. A ratings success at the time, it was written by John Chapman and produced by Thames Television for ITV, running for four series between 7 March 1984 and 23 October 1986. The series has had repeats in recent years on U&Drama. In December 2023, repeats of Fresh Fields began airing on That's TV in the UK.

== Premise and series history ==
Hester and William Fields (McKenzie and Rodgers) are a devoted middle-aged, middle-class couple living an idyllic suburban lifestyle in Barnes, London. William works as an accountant while Hester is a housewife who works part-time in local restaurant Lucy's Kitchen. The title's meaning, and crux of the show, is that Hester combats empty-nest syndrome by livening up her life with new interests and hobbies, to the exasperation of her hard-working husband who just wants a quiet life. The show's opening credits, featuring silhouettes of the characters, reflect this: Hester rides an exercise bike and plays a drumkit while William relaxes in a rocking chair.

The family home has an attached granny flat in which Hester's mother Nancy (Fanny Rowe) lives following her divorce from Hester's roguish father Guy (Ballard Berkeley); he often tries to win her back. (The pair finally remarry in the last episode.) Hester and William have two children of their own: the never-seen Tom who lives in New Zealand; and Emma, who is usually only heard (voice of Debby Cummings) telephoning her parents at inconvenient times. Emma's husband Peter (Philip Bird) appears occasionally; Emma and Peter later present the Fields with their first grandchild Guy, named after his great-grandfather.

The Fields's neighbour Sonia Barrett (played by Ann Beach) pops round in every episode to borrow items; these appearances would irritate William to comical effect. Sonia had the show's only catchphrase: "It's only Sonia!" which she carols as she raps at the Fields's back door and then lets herself in. Sonia's husband John (John Arthur) appears occasionally, as does William's secretary Miss Marigold Denham (Daphne Oxenford).

Fresh Fields ended in 1986 but three years later the series resumed as French Fields, which saw William and Hester relocating to France after William accepted a job there. There were three series of 19 episodes made between 5 September 1989 and 8 October 1991, all written by John T. Chapman and Ian Davidson. Philip Bird appears as Peter in several episodes, with Emma finally seen on-screen, now played by Sally Baxter. Ann Beach makes a guest appearance as Sonia in the final episode.

== Filming locations ==
The show's main filming location was the Fields's salubrious Victorian detached home, which is actually situated in Teddington on the A313, Hampton Road, a short drive from what was Thames TV's main studio complex, where the indoor scenes were shot.

== Cast and characters ==
Name of character	Portrayed by	Duration
Hester Fields	Julia McKenzie	Series 1–4, all episodes (27)
William Fields	Anton Rodgers	Series 1–4, all episodes (27)
Sonia Barrett	Ann Beach	Series 1–4, 26 episodes
Nancy Penrose	Fanny Rowe	Series 1–4, 26 episodes
Emma Fields	Debby Cumming	Series 1–4, 13 episodes (voice only)
Guy Penrose	Ballard Berkeley	Series 1–4, 10 episodes
Miss Denham	Daphne Oxenford	Series 1–4, 6 episodes
John Barrett	John Arthur	Series 3–4, 5 episodes
Peter Richardson	Philip Bird	Series 1, 2 and 4, 5 episodes
Ms Turner	Charlotte Barker	Series 2 and 3, 3 episodes
Henry Richardson	Eric Dodson	Series 2 and 4, 2 episodes
Margaret Richardson	Margaret Courtenay	Series 2 and 4, 2 episodes
Mrs Fielder	Zulema Dene	Series 3 and 4, 2 episodes
Miss Henshaw	Geraldine Gardner	Series 2 and 4, 2 episodes

== Episodes ==
=== Series overview ===
Series	Episodes	Originally released	
Series	Episodes	First released	Last released
1	6	7 March 1984	11 April 1984
2	6	5 September 1984	10 October 1984
3	6	4 September 1985	9 October 1985
Christmas special		25 December 1985	
4	8	4 September 1986	23 October 1986

=== Series 1 (1984) ===
No. overall	No. in series	Title	Directed by	Written by	Original release date
1	1	"Dish of the Day"	Peter Frazer-Jones	John Chapman	7 March 1984
Hester spices things up with a foray into haute cuisine, starting a job as a part-time chef at a local restaurant. But she is missing one vital ingredient for her debut, and only William can save the day.
2	2	"Middle-Age Dread"	Peter Frazer-Jones	John Chapman	14 March 1984
Suddenly feeling her years, Hester is determined to prove she is not too old to start a new career, but her confidence is shaken after she is turned down for a job at a trendy boutique for being too old. She applies for the job instore again, wearing a wig, sunglasses & different outfit. Her attempt to appear young is successful; she is not recognised and is hired. However, she decides not to take the job.
3	3	"Hook, Line and Sink Her"	Peter Frazer-Jones	John Chapman	21 March 1984
William plans to get away from it all with a day's fishing. But there is a catch: his wife and mother-in-law want to come along. The addition of yet another person to the party threatens to change the whole trip entirely.
4	4	"The Naked Truth"	Peter Frazer-Jones	John Chapman	28 March 1984
Keen to impress a prospective client visiting from the Middle East, William enlists Hester's help to ensure the trip goes off without a hitch. The Fields soon discover that the man has an unusual understanding of mixing business with pleasure.
5	5	"Des Det Res"	Peter Frazer-Jones	John Chapman	4 April 1984
With property taxes due, William comes up with a drastic solution: He decides it is time to sell their house and move to a smaller place. Hester has other ideas and enlists two co-conspirators to help execute her plan.
6	6	"Something in the Oven"	Peter Frazer-Jones	John Chapman	11 April 1984
Hester is unnerved when she learns that a food critic will be at the restaurant during her shift. And then her unmarried daughter Emma informs her that she is pregnant.

=== Series 2 (1984) ===
No. overall	No. in series	Title	Directed by	Written by	Original release date
7	1	"A Night to Remember"	Peter Frazer-Jones	John Chapman	5 September 1984
William organizes a special getaway to mark their 24th wedding anniversary. He surprises Hester by taking her back to the hotel where he first proposed — but an even bigger surprise awaits them.
8	2	"A Brief Encounter"	Peter Frazer-Jones	John Chapman	12 September 1984
Hackles arise when William notices that Hester's fencing instructor, a known Casanova, is much too attentive. Hester sees no cause for alarm; only when she lowers her guard does she realise William might have a point.
9	3	"Alright on the Night"	Peter Frazer-Jones	John Chapman	19 September 1984
Hester is roped into organising the church bazaar and concert while William plans to escape it on a fishing trip. But when a performer calls in sick, Hester finds an unexpected role for William.
10	4	"In the Spring"	Peter Frazer-Jones	John Chapman	26 September 1984
A scandalous neighbourhood affair gets Hester's creative juices flowing and she begins a new writing project. Meanwhile, her father takes an entirely different kind of inspiration from the situation.
11	5	"Business Contacts"	Peter Frazer-Jones	John Chapman	3 October 1984
Ever-helpful Hester volunteers to run William's office when his secretary calls in sick, and she must get creative when an important new client arrives to an appointment and William is nowhere to be found.
12	6	"Get Me to the Church"	Peter Frazer-Jones	John Chapman	10 October 1984
Emma finally sets a date for her wedding. The church is booked, the groom's jet-setting parents fly in, and the wedding party assembles for the grand occasion. But nobody can make an entrance quite like Hester.

=== Series 3 (1985) ===
No. overall	No. in series	Title	Directed by	Written by	Original release date
13	1	"Do It Yourself"	Peter Frazer-Jones	John Chapman	4 September 1985
Planning to redecorate, Hester calls in an expert - who literally falls down on the job.
14	2	"A Waiting Game"	Peter Frazer-Jones	John Chapman	11 September 1985
Attempting to cater a large party, Hester is reduced to persuading William to stand in as butler - which gets complicated when some of his clients turn up as guests.
15	3	"Moveable Feasts"	Peter Frazer-Jones	John Chapman	18 September 1985
Hester attempts to deliver "meals-on-wheels" while babysitting her newborn grandson.
16	4	"Tipping the Scales"	Peter Frazer-Jones	John Chapman	25 September 1985
According to Hester, slimming is easy: just give up food and drink. After a starvation diet, William is ready to give up Hester.
17	5	"Crossed Lines"	Peter Frazer-Jones	John Chapman	2 October 1985
Up for election to a local committee, Hester meets her rival - an attractive blonde - head-on at a wine-tasting party.
18	6	"Alarums And Excursions"	Peter Frazer-Jones	John Chapman	9 October 1985
Sonia reads Hester's fortune, which predicts both travel and a secret admirer.

=== Christmas special (1985) ===
No.	Title	Directed by	Written by	Original release date
19	"A Dickens of a Christmas"	Peter Frazer-Jones	John Chapman	25 December 1985
Hester cooks up more than she bargained for when she spices up William's dinner.

=== Series 4 (1986) ===
No. overall	No. in series	Title	Directed by	Written by	Original release date
20	1	"A Nose for Trouble"	Peter Frazer-Jones	John Chapman	4 September 1986
William's snoring keeps Hester awake night after night.
21	2	"The Old Folks at Home"	Peter Frazer-Jones	John Chapman	11 September 1986
Upset that a Victorian mansion is to be torn down and replaced by "a block of flats," Hester starts a campaign to persuade local councillor Mr. Gardner to convert the premises into a seniors' residence. When he doubts the need for such a facility, Hester invites him home, having persuaded Nancy, her sister Winnie, and Guy to pretend senility. The appalled Gardner not only approves the home but telephones to notify William and Hester that he has arranged for their dotty dependents to move in immediately.
22	3	"One Damned Ming After Another"	Peter Frazer-Jones	John Chapman	18 September 1986
The Fields hope to get their Chinese vase onto a locally filmed episode of Antiques Roadshow. Returning home, they surprise a burglar — enabling Hester to use her newly-acquired martial arts skills.
23	4	"Life Is Full of Ups and Downs"	Peter Frazer-Jones	John Chapman	25 September 1986
William and Hester go shopping in Boulogne.
24	5	"Takes Two to Tango"	Peter Frazer-Jones	John Chapman	2 October 1986
William and Hester's son-in-law Peter invites them to a dinner dance.
25	6	"Caught in the Act"	Peter Frazer-Jones	John Chapman	9 October 1986
William insists on mending a leaky kitchen tap himself, necessitating an expensive visit from the plumber. Meanwhile, Hester gets a call from Peter's parents, the Richardsons, who are coming from Dorset to London for the day and invite themselves to dinner and to stay overnight. Driven mad by overbearing Margaret and epically boring Henry, and dismayed when their guests decide to stay another night, the Fields invent a dinner engagement at a Bournemouth hotel, but actually bundle themselves and Nancy next door to Sonia's for the night. Then Margaret and Henry turn up to chat with Sonia, and the Fields flee to Nancy's granny flat — where they are mistaken for burglars. They fib that Nancy has come down with flu; next morning Margaret cheerfully announces that Henry has caught it from Nancy and needs to stay in bed for several days.
26	7	"Brighton or Bust"	Peter Frazer-Jones	John Chapman	16 October 1986
Hester signs up for a charity bicycle race.
27	8	"Happy Returns"	Peter Frazer-Jones	John Chapman	23 October 1986
After a sojourn in Italy, the Fields return home to celebrate Hester's 45th birthday. Despite William's back going out, and some complications arising from misunderstandings, they settle on dinner out to celebrate — whereupon Hester is summoned to deal with an emergency at Lucy's Kitchen. This turns out to be a ruse: the restaurant is packed with friends for a surprise party. Then comes the biggest surprise: Guy and Nancy announce that they were remarried that morning!

== Home releases ==
All four series of Fresh Fields have been released on DVD. A 7-disc set (containing both the series and the sequel, French Fields) was released in 2011.

An Australian release of both series (Fresh Fields and French Fields) has the original pilot episode of the series as an extra, along with a variety special.

DVD	Release date
The Complete Series 1	12 April 2010
The Complete Series 2	23 August 2010
The Complete Series 3	21 February 2011
The Complete Series 4	16 May 2011
The Complete Series 1 to 4 Box Set	24 October 2011
