= Slinger's Day =

British TV sitcom (1986–1987)

- Genre: Sitcom
- Created by: Brian Cooke
- Starring: Bruce Forsyth; Paul Clarkson; David Kelly; Philip Bird; Andrew Paul; Liz Crowther; Charlie Hawkins; Vicky Licorish; Suzanne Church; Jacqueline de Paza
- Country of origin: United Kingdom
- Original language: English
- No. of series: 2
- No. of episodes: 12

Production
- Producer: Mark Stuart
- Running time: 30 minutes
- Production company: Thames Television

Original release
- Network: ITV
- Release: 3 September 1986 – 14 October 1987

Related
- Tripper's Day; Check It Out!; Full Frys

Slinger's Day is a British sitcom that aired for two series from 3 September 1986 to 14 October 1987, made by Thames Television for the ITV network. It was a continuation of Tripper's Day, which had originally come to a natural end after Leonard Rossiter's death, and, despite the overwhelmingly negative response it had drawn from reviewers and a section of the viewing public, was revived this time with Bruce Forsyth as a different character to Rossiter but fulfilling the same role, that of the manager of a London supermarket with largely incompetent staff.

Like Tripper's Day, it was created by Brian Cooke, however, in contrast to the previous series, Cooke only wrote two episodes of the twelve episodes, more than half of them being written by Vince Powell with others being written by Alex Shearer and Sorry! creators Ian Davidson and Peter Vincent, and one episode written by the prolific Andrew Marshall and David Renwick.

Slinger's Day represented Forsyth's only ever situation comedy acting role, and he remained more associated with stand-up routines and game shows.

== Plot ==
Cecil Slinger (played by Forsyth) is designated by the Supafare supermarket chain as the new manager in the branch that had previously been run by Norman Tripper. Like his predecessor, Slinger is forced to manage a supermarket branch that employs possibly the worst supermarket staff in the world: Mr. Christian (played by Clarkson), the cheerful but naïve assistant manager; Fred (played by Kelly), a lazy, alcoholic and inept security guard; Hardie (played by Bird), the union shop steward; as well as Higgins, Hardie's assistant of sorts (played by Paul), secretary Sylvia (played by Crowther) and checkout cashier Dottie (played by Licorish).

Fred replaced Alf (played in Tripper's by Gordon Gostelow), and in the second series Sylvia was replaced by Miss Foster (played by Church) and Dottie was replaced by Shirley (played by de Paza).

== Cast ==
The three main actors credited in the opening credits of Tripper's Day (Leonard Rossiter, Pat Ashton and Gordon Gostelow) did not reprise their roles for Slinger's Day, with the Rossiter and Gostelow roles replaced respectively by Bruce Forsyth and David Kelly. Many of the supporting cast of Tripper's Day did reprise their roles for the show, however only Philip Bird and Paul Clarkson appeared in both series of Slinger's Day.

- Bruce Forsyth as Cecil Slinger
- David Kelly as Fred
- Philip Bird as Hardie
- Paul Clarkson as Mr Christian
- Andrew Paul as Higgins (series 1)
- Vicky Licorish as Dottie (series 1)
- Liz Crowther as Sylvia (series 1)
- Suzanne Church as Miss Foster (series 2)
- Jacqueline De Peza as Shirley (series 2)
- Charlie Hawkins as Colin Wilkins (series 2)

== Transmissions ==
Series	Episodes	Originally released	
Series	Episodes	First released	Last released
1	6	3 September 1986	8 October 1986
2	6	9 September 1987	14 October 1987

== Episodes ==
=== Series 1 (1986) ===
No. overall	No. in series	Title	Directed by	Written by	Original release date
1	1	"New Management"	Mark Stuart	Brian Cooke	3 September 1986
Cecil Slinger takes over a struggling Supafare branch.
2	2	"Going Bananas"	Mark Stuart	Brian Cooke	10 September 1986
3	3	"Butter Wouldn't Melt"	Mark Stuart	Vince Powell	17 September 1986
4	4	"A Right Royal Mix-Up"	Mark Stuart	Vince Powell	24 September 1986
5	5	"Black Letter Day"	Mark Stuart	Vince Powell	1 October 1986
While trying to get himself a promotion, Slinger inadvertently sends a nasty letter to the area manager.
6	6	"The Nightshift"	Mark Stuart	Alex Shearer	8 October 1986

=== Series 2 (1987) ===
No. overall	No. in series	Title	Directed by	Written by	Original release date
7	1	"Lost and Found"	Mark Stuart	Vince Powell	9 September 1987
8	2	"Whose Baby?"	Mark Stuart	Vince Powell	16 September 1987
9	3	"Taken for a Ride"	Mark Stuart	Ian Davidson and Peter Vincent	23 September 1987
10	4	"Initiative"	Mark Stuart	Andrew Marshall and David Renwick	30 September 1987
The store must move five hundred units of fishcakes before they go bad.
11	5	"The Stocktake"	Mark Stuart	Alex Shearer	7 October 1987
12	6	"A Pane in the Neck"	Mark Stuart	Vince Powell	14 October 1987
When a window pane is accidentally broken, Mr. Slinger is forced to stay overnight and watch the shop.

== Home media ==
The complete series of Slinger's Day was released on 23 April 2012.

== See also ==
- Check It Out! (Canadian-produced series following the Tripper's/Slinger's format with Don Adams)
