= Faeries (1999 film) =

Animated film

- Promotional poster
- Directed by: Gary Hurst
- Written by: Jocelyn Stevenson
- Produced by: Naomi Jones
- Starring: Kate Winslet; Jeremy Irons; Dougray Scott; Charlotte Coleman; Jane Horrocks
- Edited by: Keith Ware
- Music by: Colin Towns
- Production companies: Cartwn Cymru Productions; HIT Entertainment; United News & Media/HTV Cymru Wales
- Distributed by: HIT Entertainment
- Release date: 9 July 1999
- Running time: 77 minutes
- Country: United Kingdom
- Language: English

Faeries is a 1999 British animated fantasy film directed by Gary Hurst from a screenplay written by Jocelyn Stevenson, and featuring the voices of Kate Winslet, Dougray Scott and Jeremy Irons.

== Plot ==
While waiting for their new home to be renovated, Nellie and her younger brother George are sent to a farm in the countryside, much to George's delight and Nellie's disgust. However, the farmhouse and the surrounding area are teeming with magical fey creatures, most of which Nellie cannot see initially because she doesn't believe in faeries. The first the two children properly encounter is a somewhat crotchety and unfriendly Hobgoblin named Broom (whom Nellie can see) who is (more or less) secretly looking after the farm.

While playing outside, George inadvertently stumbles into a faery ring surrounding a massive, ancient oak tree and ends up in the realm of faeries. Nellie is able to bribe Broom with honey cakes in exchange for him showing her how to see the faeries and how to find and enter Faeryland. Broom warns Nellie not to eat or drink anything while she is there, however, she reaches her brother just in time to see George eating a faery cake. The uptight Chudley informs them that the law of the faery realm states that a mortal who consumes even one mouthful of faery food must remain in the realm forever. Nellie and George strongly — and noisily — protest. The commotion attracts the attention of the Faery Prince Albrecht, the ruler of the realm, who offers them a chance to escape by setting three tasks for them.

What they do not know is that the evil brother of the Prince, the Shapeshifter, and his goblin henchmen, are trying to manipulate the children and the faery citizens (Merrivale, Huccaby, Chudley, and Starcross are the only ones met in the film) to usurp the rulership of the faery realm. The Shapeshifter can steal the throne with ease if he obtains the Orb, a powerful magical sceptre in his brother's possession. In addition, the Prince falls in love with a friend of the children, the pretty human farmhand Brigid, which proves pivotal in an old prophecy that foretells the future for the faery realm.

Nellie and George succeed in bringing Brigid to Faeryland, where she meets and falls in love with the Prince. Later, the children are instrumental in foiling the Shapeshifter's attempt to cause war between Albrecht and the faery princess to whom he was originally betrothed. Once the Shapeshifter is defeated, the princess gives Brigid and Albrecht her blessing, and Nellie and George watch as Brigid is married to Albrecht, and is transformed into a faery. Two tasks down, the children return to the farm, where the faeries have left a fabricated letter to explain Brigid's disappearance.

Later, the children bring Brigid to the home of her friend, whose newborn baby is Brigid's godson (making Brigid a real fairy godmother.) However, the Shapeshifter has followed them, and steals the child, leaving a goblin replacement. Brigid must steal the Orb for the Shapeshifter if she wants to rescue the child. Brigid makes the trade, but is horrified to see the faeries upon her return-now drastically aged, and Albrecht close to death, as the Orb is also the source of the faeries' youth and immortality. Brigid is only unaffected because she has not been a faery long enough to noticeably age. With a little help from Broom, the children and Brigid make a plan. Using a bead, a brooch pin, and a pinch of hobgoblin magic, the group creates a fake Orb. Nellie and George sneak into a goblin party and successfully swap the Orbs. Brigid returns the original to its rightful place in the palace, saving the faeries' lives and restoring their youth.

The Shapeshifter, unaware that the Orb in his possession is fake, marches into Faeryland, believing his brother and the other faeries to be dead. He is confronted by the children, who reveal the deception. Albrecht arrives, battles his brother (who transforms into a mantis-like monster) and ultimately wins.

The Shapeshifter and all but one of his henchmen are thrown into prison. The last one evades detection and runs away. Nellie and George have completed their three tasks, and, as a reward for saving Faeryland, are allowed to consume as much faery food as they desire, without having to remain in Faeryland or complete another three tasks. The film ends with the children deciding to extend their stay at the farm, and the faeries flying back to the tree.

== Cast ==
- Kate Winslet as Brigid
- Jeremy Irons as The Shapeshifter
- Dougray Scott as Faery Prince Albrecht
- Charlotte Coleman as Merrivale
- Jane Horrocks as Huccaby
- June Whitfield as Mrs. Lucy Coombs
- John Sessions as Chudley
- Tony Robinson as Broom
- Fred Ridge as George
- Carley O'Neill as Nellie
- Michael Burrell as Mr. Andrew Coombs and Fume
- Patrick Marlowe as Mone
- Jessica Martin as Helen and Skrawk
- Elizabeth Morton as Princess Brigid
- Tracy-Ann Oberman as Tippycoll

== Release ==
The movie first aired on ITV franchisee HTV Cymru Wales on 9 July 1999. It was not released on VHS in the UK, but it was released on DVD in March 2005 by HIT Entertainment.

It was released on VHS in the United States in September 2000 by Paramount Home Video.
