= Euan Uglow =

British artist (1932– 2000)

- Born: Euan Ernest Richard Uglow; 10 March 1932; London, England
- Died: 31 August 2000 (aged 68); London, England
- Education: Camberwell School of Art
- Occupation: Painter
- Known for: Nude and still-life painting

Euan Ernest Richard Uglow (10 March 1932 – 31 August 2000) was a British painter. He is best known for his nude and still-life paintings, such as German Girl and Skull.

Born in London, he studied at the Camberwell School of Art. His instructors included William Coldstream, whose meticulous method of painting from life involved repeated, careful measurements. Uglow continued his studies under Coldstream at the Slade School of Art until 1954, and later taught there. Uglow's adaptation of Coldstream's method of painting included the use of a metal instrument of his own design with which he could take the measure of an object or interval to compare against other objects or intervals in his field of vision. By the use of such empirical measurements, he contrived to paint what the eye sees without the use of conventional perspective. Uglow's finished paintings display the many small horizontal and vertical markings with which he recorded these coordinates so that they could be verified against reality.

Public collection holding Uglow's works include the Tate Gallery, the Metropolitan Museum of Art, and the National Museum of Wales.

== Biography ==
Euan Uglow was born in 1932 in London. As a child, he lived in Tulse Hill in south London, where his father was an accountant. Uglow went to the local grammar school in Tulse Hill, Strand School. Afterwards he studied at Camberwell School of Art from 1948 to 1950, during a time when Camberwell students studied under artists such as Victor Pasmore, Lawrence Gowing, John Minton, Kenneth Martin and William Coldstream. Uglow was influenced by Coldstream while at Camberwell, although he believed that another tutor there, the painter Claude Rogers, was more significant in his development. Nonetheless, when Coldstream left Camberwell to teach at the Slade School of Art in 1951, Uglow followed him, and remained a student at the Slade until 1954.

Refusing compulsory military service, Uglow was registered as a conscientious objector in 1954, and spent two years undertaking community work, assisting in the restoration of a war-damaged church by Christopher Wren in the City of London, redecorating the house of the artist Patrick George, and helping on a farm in Surrey.

Success in art was not immediate, and he did not sell a painting until eight years after leaving art school. During this time he took a variety of part-time teaching jobs, most notably at the Slade from 1961, an institution with which he was to be associated for the rest of his life.

In 1962, he was at the centre of a storm at the municipal art gallery in Bradford, Yorkshire, when a local councillor, Horace Hird, had one of Uglow's paintings, German Girl, removed from an Arts Council exhibition at the gallery. Hird claimed the painting "offended decency".

Despite this, Uglow was generally a shy artist who shunned publicity as well as honours, including an offer to become a member of the Royal Academy in 1961. However, he did become a trustee of the National Gallery in London in 1991, although, in his own words, he was generally ignored by the other trustees.

Uglow's first solo show was in 1961 at the Beaux Arts Gallery, but his slow and methodical working method did not lead to a large number of solo shows. In 1969, he exhibited drawings at the Gardener Centre at Sussex University, in 1974 at the Whitechapel Art Gallery in London and then periodically at the Browse & Darby Gallery in London. He also took part in numerous group shows, including an exhibition of the London Group. He won the John Moores Painting Prize, awarded in Liverpool, in 1972. In 1981, he took part in the exhibition Eight Figurative Painters at the University of Yale Center for British Art in New Haven, Connecticut, United States, and in 1984 in The Hard Won Image at the Tate Gallery, London. In 1992, he featured in the exhibition British Figurative Painting of the 20th Century at the Israel Museum in Jerusalem, and in 2000 in the exhibition Encounters at the National Gallery in London. In 2002, a posthumous retrospective was organised by the Arts Council for England, entitled Spotlight on Euan Uglow, which toured around Britain. In 2003, there was a retrospective titled Euan Uglow: Controlled Passion, Fifty Years of Painting at the Abbot Hall Gallery, in Kendal.

In 1980, Uglow was invited by the artist Stass Paraskos to become the first artist-in-residence at the new Cyprus College of Art arts centre in village of Lempa on the island of Cyprus.

He has work in the collections of the Arts Council of England, the British Council, the National Museum of Wales, the Ferens Art Gallery in Hull, Glasgow Art Gallery, the Metropolitan Museum of Art in New York, Southampton City Art Gallery, the British Government Art Collection, the Tate Gallery and The Hepworth in Wakefield.

Uglow died of liver cancer at his home in Wandsworth, London, in 2000, aged 68.

== Style and influences ==
Uglow was predominantly a painter of the human figure, although he also painted still life and landscapes. His method was meticulous, involving a great deal of measuring and correction to create images that are not hyper real, but appear almost sculptural. Writing in 1990, Tim Wilcox said: "[Uglow's] staple is the traditional studio nude but set in relation to an artificial space contrived by the artist himself with geometrical markings and the odd prop used as if by a minimalist stage designer." The measuring process was laborious and time-consuming to the point that Uglow himself joked that one model he began painting when she was engaged, was still painting when she got married and did not finish painting until she was divorced.

As this indicates, Uglow worked directly from life, and one of the features of his paintings was that he did not attempt to hide the process of construction. Remnants of the measurements he took and the drawing guide he used remain visible in the finished paintings. This was a process that Uglow developed from his early studies under William Coldstream, and it was to become a mainstay of teaching at the Slade School of Art in London tying into an already long standing emphasis on drawing there. The result was paintings that had a strong sculptural quality, but within the tradition of the shallow picture plane of modernism, particularly as it was understood by Cézanne, although Uglow's work has also been compared to the simple classicism of the Renaissance artist Piero della Francesca particularly for the way he would make his life models pose in ways to emphasise simple geometric shapes. Planes are articulated very precisely, edges are sharply defined, and colours are differentiated with great subtlety.

Uglow preferred that his canvas be a square, a golden rectangle, or a rectangle of exact root value, as is the case with the Root Five Nude (1976). He then carried out careful measurements at every stage of painting, a method Coldstream had imparted to him and which is identified with the painters of the Euston Road School. Standing before the subject to be painted, Uglow registered measurements by means of a metal instrument of his own design (derived from a modified music stand); with one eye closed and with the arm of the instrument against his cheek, keeping the calibrations at a constant distance from the eye, the artist could take the measure of an object or interval to compare against other objects or intervals he saw before him. Such empirical measurements enable an artist to paint what the eye sees without the use of conventional perspective. The surfaces of Uglow's paintings carry many small horizontal and vertical markings, where he recorded these coordinates so that they could be verified against reality.

Colour was fundamental to his understanding, and painters such as Matisse and the Venetians influenced him all his artistic life along with many others, although perhaps Cézanne, Morandi, Poussin and Ingres were closest to his heart. Uglow described to an interviewer the inspiration for his still life Lemon (1973):

I'll tell you what Lemon is about ... It's the dome at Volterra that Brunelleschi was supposed to have helped with. It's most beautiful, very simple, very lovely. I couldn't paint the dome there, so when I came back I thought I'd try to paint it from a lemon.

Zagi (1981–82), which depicts a standing nude, was inspired by a children's toy of an acrobat, with the word Zagi itself being Chinese for acrobat.

Uglow's paintings made while he was an artist-in-residence at the Cyprus College of Art in 1980, and again in 1983, are almost wholly landscapes, and he used the clear summer skies of Cyprus as a stark contrast of flat colour against the geometrical and sculptural forms he painted at ground level. But Uglow was also well travelled to other countries, spending six months in Italy on a Prix de Rome scholarship in 1953, and later making work in France, Spain, Morocco, Turkey, India and China.

One of the most notable paintings made by Uglow was a nude painting of Cherie Booth, future wife of the former British Prime Minister Tony Blair, left unfinished in 1978. Art critic Frank Whitford, writing in The Sunday Times has jokingly suggested Uglow made such an impression on the young Cherie that 30 years later the Blairs named their son after him. His Articulation (1993–95) features a reclining nude woman with her back to the viewer, with a tree branch in the background; actress Lisa Coleman was the model.
