= French Fields =

British TV sitcom (1989–1991)

- Created by: John T. Chapman; Ian Davidson
- Starring: Julia McKenzie; Anton Rodgers; Pamela Salem; Karen Ascoe (series 2-3); Victoria Baker; Sally Baxter (series 1); Philip Bird; Nicholas Courtney; Olivia Courtney; Liz Crowther; Robin Kermode; Valerie Lush; Philip McGough (series 3); Olivier Pierre (series 1-2)
- Country of origin: United Kingdom
- Original language: English
- No. of series: 3
- No. of episodes: 19

Production
- Running time: 30 minutes (including commercials)
- Production company: Thames Television

Original release
- Network: ITV
- Release: 5 September 1989 – 8 October 1991

Related
- Fresh Fields

French Fields is a British television sitcom. It is a sequel/continuation of the series Fresh Fields and ran for 19 episodes from 5 September 1989 to 8 October 1991. It was written by John T. Chapman (who created and wrote all the episodes of Fresh Fields) and Ian Davidson and was produced by Thames Television for ITV. Like Fresh Fields, the theme tune to French Fields was an arrangement of Pick Yourself Up from the 1936 film Swing Time. The theme tune was played on an accordion and had a French feel to it. The music was by Alan Parker this time and not Harry Stoneham.

== Cast ==
The series stars Anton Rodgers and Julia McKenzie as middle-aged, middle-class husband and wife William and Hester Fields and follows the series Fresh Fields, which ran from 1984 to 1986. French Fields resumes the story three years later as William accepts a position with a French company and the series follows Hester and William as they move from London to Calais. The pair are regularly visited by their daughter Emma (Sally Baxter and Karen Ascoe) and son-in-law Peter (Philip Bird). Bird is the only other Fresh Fields actor to appear regularly, as Emma only "appeared" via voiceover by Debby Cummings in the original show.

Other regular cast members include their French estate agent Chantal Moriac (Pamela Salem), who is also the Fields' neighbour to the left, and snobbish English couple Hugh (Robin Kermode) and Jill (Liz Crowther) Trendle, the neighbours to the right. Hester and William also cope with Madame Remoleux (Valerie Lush), the unintelligible, ancient, and generally useless (but unsackable) French cleaner who lives on and cares for the estate, "Les Hirondelles," ("Swallows" in English) where they all live. Also popping in regularly are local farmer and mayor Monsieur Dax (Olivier Pierre in series 1 and 2 and Philip McGough in series 3) and his cheeky daughter Marie-Christine (Victoria Baker), to whom Hester does her best to teach English. Nicholas Courtney also appears frequently as the estate's owner, the Marquis.

Ann Beach, Sonia in Fresh Fields, makes a guest appearance in the final episode, in which Hester and William decide to return to their former UK home.

== Episodes ==
=== Series 1 (1989) ===
No. overall	No. in series	Title	Directed by	Written by	Original release date
1	1	"Chunnel Vision"	Mark Stuart	John Chapman & Ian Davidson	5 September 1989
William and Hester decide to visit France for a taste of what their life there might be like. With his accountant mind, William weighs the pros and cons of making a move. Somehow, it all turns on a serving of shepherd's pie.
2	2	"William the Conquered"	Mark Stuart	John Chapman & Ian Davidson	12 September 1989
The Fields break the news to their daughter and son-in-law that they're relocating to France. Now all they have to do is find a place to live, which ends up being more challenging than either expected.
3	3	"A Moving Experience"	Derrick Goodwin	John Chapman & Ian Davidson	19 September 1989
Moving out of their home in England proves trying for William. Getting to their new house in France proves just as tough, especially when Hester misplaces their passports and William forgets which side of the road to drive on.
4	4	"Ou Est La Plumber De Ma Tante?"	Derrick Goodwin	John Chapman & Ian Davidson	26 September 1989
William prepares for his first day of work in France, and Hester faces the prospect of dealing with a French plumber. Then just as she starts organising her new home, an unexpected lunchtime caller throws off her whole afternoon.
5	5	"Who's Been Eating My Porridge?"	Derrick Goodwin	John Chapman & Ian Davidson	3 October 1989
Hester insists on inviting William's new boss and his wife to dinner and serving some real English cheese for the occasion. William's efforts to oblige bring about his first brush with the law.
6	6	"Le Week-End"	Mark Stuart	John Chapman & Ian Davidson	10 October 1989
The Fields host their first visitors from England when Emma and Peter arrive for a short break, but by visit's end, William and Hester are ready for their own break.

=== Series 2 (1990) ===
No. overall	No. in series	Title	Directed by	Written by	Original release date
7	1	"Long Legged Beasties and Things That Go Bump in the Night"	Mark Stuart	John Chapman & Ian Davidson	24 September 1990
When a local farmer's nocturnal activities keep the Fields up at night, William wants to complain to the mayor - until he finds out who the mayor is. Hester intervenes to teach everyone a lesson in getting along.
8	2	"Inside Story"	Mark Stuart	John Chapman & Ian Davidson	1 October 1990
A top French magazine wants to do a story about the increasing number of English people moving to France — and picks the Fields as a typical couple. Thanks to a series of misunderstandings, the magazine gets a distorted view of the English.
9	3	"Sheep May Safely Graze"	Mark Stuart	John Chapman & Ian Davidson	8 October 1990
Hester wins a raffle at the village fair, but her prize isn't just a leg of mutton; they're four legs still attached to the sheep!
10	4	"Home and Away"	Mark Stuart	John Chapman & Ian Davidson	15 October 1990
William anticipates going on a motoring tour of France for his annual vacation, but his nautical-minded wife and daughter have other ideas and before long he's ready to jump ship.
11	5	"Sale or Return"	Mark Stuart	John Chapman & Ian Davidson	22 October 1990
When the Fields's lease on their beloved farmhouse comes to an end, their obnoxious English neighbours try to buy the place. William and Hester are powerless to stop them - until they get help from an unexpected source.
12	6	"Double or Quit"	Mark Stuart	John Chapman & Ian Davidson	29 October 1990
William wins the locals' respect when he proves adept at the French game of boules. His newly-demonstrated skills not only allow him to win the game, but also to secure for Hester the thing she treasures above all else about their life in France.

=== Christmas special (1990) ===
No.	Title	Directed by	Written by	Original release date
13	"Noël, Noël"	Mark Stuart	John Chapman & Ian Davidson	25 December 1990
The Fields plan a Christmas celebration with the whole family, but their daughter has made other arrangements. Hester tries to teach the local schoolchildren some English carols, and her Christmas pudding does not go down too well with the neighbours.

=== Series 3 (1991) ===
No. overall	No. in series	Title	Directed by	Written by	Original release date
14	1	"French with Tears"	Mark Stuart	John Chapman & Ian Davidson	3 September 1991
Misunderstanding French ways lands Hester in a French jail, then misjudging the local speed limit as he drives to her aid gets William arrested. Hester's only hope is son-in-law Peter and his night course in French law.
15	2	"The Merry, Merry Pipes"	Mark Stuart	John Chapman & Ian Davidson	10 September 1991
Hester agrees to show a group of British house-hunters some local properties, while William struggles with a plumbing problem at his own house. William's difficulties mount when Hester's tour party shows up to use the bathroom.
16	3	"Make for the Hills"	Mark Stuart	John Chapman & Ian Davidson	17 September 1991
Emma's in-laws arrive unexpectedly for a visit, and the Fields look for any excuse to get out of town. When their camping trip somehow lands them in Paris, they realise they shouldn't have bothered.
17	4	"Surprise, Surprise"	Mark Stuart	John Chapman & Ian Davidson	24 September 1991
The Fields's 25th anniversary is approaching, and William is determined to throw Hester a surprise party.
18	5	"Darling Daughters"	Mark Stuart	John Chapman & Ian Davidson	1 October 1991
Hester runs afoul of the mayor when she tries to discipline his daughter, while William has problems with his own, Emma. Hester tries to explain the concept of fair play by explaining the rules of cricket.
19	6	"Hail and Farewell"	Mark Stuart	John Chapman & Ian Davidson	8 October 1991
William learns that getting fired in French sounds just the same as it does in English. The Fields know they can always go back to England if the worst comes to the worst, which it does when they learn who's renting the farmhouse next door.

== Home releases ==
All three series of French Fields have been released on DVD by Network. A 7-disc boxed set containing all episodes of both Fresh Fields and French Fields was also released by the company.

The entire series was released in a single DVD box set by Acorn Media UK on 2012-2-28.

DVD	Release date
The Complete Series 1	13 June 2011
The Complete Series 2	25 July 2011
The Complete Series 3	19 September 2011
The Complete Fresh Fields & French Fields Box Set	24 October 2011
