= Double Act (film) =

- Written by: Jacqueline Wilson
- Directed by: Cilla Ware
- Starring: Zoe Tempest-Jones; Chloe Tempest-Jones
- Country of origin: United Kingdom
- Original language: English

Original release
- Release: 2002

Double Act is a TV adaptation of Jacqueline Wilson's best selling book, Double Act. The telefilm was made in 2001 for Channel 4 and screened in 2002, starring Birmingham twins, Zoe and Chloe Tempest-Jones. It was directed by Cilla Ware. It was the last acting role of Charlotte Coleman before she died.

The film won a Royal Television Society Programme Award for best children's drama in 2003.

== Production ==
Filming took place in Moseley and Clun in Shropshire. One scene was shot at Alexandra Theatre in Birmingham.

== Plot ==
Ruby and Garnet are identical twins, who once lived with their Dad and their Gran in Birmingham. Their mother Opal died a few years earlier. They are happy together, but then Dad gets a new girlfriend, Rose. The twins and Gran hate her. Dad decides to make things worse for them when he loses his job. He sends Gran to a Senior Citizens' Home and takes his three girls to the country, to open a bookshop. The bookshop more or less fails. The twins make enemies with a fat boy called Jeremy who they nickname "Blob" and his gang. Garnet also makes a new friend called Judy.

Because they totally loathe their new life, they do everything bad at school to get expelled so that they can go back to Birmingham and then regret it. They apologise to Dad and make him biscuits.

Whilst doing this, Ruby comes across a Newspaper Advert for an audition for a Television adaptation of the novel "The Terrible Tempest Twins,". Garnet isn't keen but Ruby insists on asking Dad. So Ruby steals money from Rose as well as telling Garnet to sell their grandmother's doll for £20 and forcing Garnet to go to Birmingham with her to the audition.

The casting director (played by Double Act's author Jacqueline Wilson) is very impressed with Ruby and Garnet but Dad finds them and takes them home.

When they are watching the news that night, Ruby appears on TV giving a quick wave to the camera. Then they show the filming location, a boarding school called Marnock Heights. Ruby insists on writing a letter to the headteacher, to try to get Garnet and her a place. They get a reply with a brochure. Then they realize that it costs £10,000, unless they get a scholarship. They sit an entrance exam, but only one girl can get the scholarship. Ruby is so confident that it's her, that when Garnet gets the place, she goes on a hateful resentment towards her, desperate to be different. Garnet copies her to be her twin, and then Ruby loses the rag completely and violently chops off her pigtails. She won't talk to Garnet at all and then the day comes when Garnet is going to Marnock Heights, when Ruby suddenly regrets her actions and apologizes. They make up and Garnet later calls her with her new mobile and everything is brilliant, considering she was really nervous beforehand. The film closes with the quote "We'll always be Ruby and Garnet, for ever and ever and ever." The song It Takes Two by Marvin Gaye and Kim Weston is played over the closing credits (coincidentally part of the song was heard being sung by one pair of the auditioning twins earlier in the film).

== Cast ==
- Ruby Barker - Zoe Tempest-Jones
- Garnet Barker - Chloe Tempest-Jones
- Richard Barker - Paul Warriner
- Rose - Rachael Dowling
- Gran - Ann Beach
- Miss Debenham - Charlotte Coleman
- Jeremy (aka Blob) - Charles Pette
- Casting director - Jacqueline Wilson
