= Paul Clarkson =

British actor, theatre director and teacher

Paul Clarkson is an English actor, theatre director and teacher. He was born and educated in Worcester and trained at LAMDA from 1979 to 1981.

He has been Assistant Director at the Swan Theatre, Worcester, Associate Director at Derby Playhouse theatre, Director of Drama at Pangbourne College, Berkshire and Course Director of the BA (Hons) acting course at Birmingham School of Acting. He was also Head of Drama at Solihull School, Solihull, Course Director Performing Arts at Abingdon College and a teacher of Drama at Golden Hillock School, Sparkhill, Birmingham.

In 1984, he won the Laurence Olivier Award for Best Actor in a Musical playing John Tallentire in Howard Goodall and Melvyn Bragg’s The Hired Man at the Astoria Theatre, London. He also created the role of Harry Bright in the original production of Mamma Mia! at the Prince Edward Theatre, London.

His other theatre work includes: Alfie Byrne in the European premiere of the musical A Man of No Importance at the Union Theatre, Southwark and the Arts Theatre, London. Dave in the world premiere of Promises and Lies (Birmingham Rep). Hamp in For King and Country (Greenwich Theatre), Working Class Hero, The Hired Man, Venetian Twins, (Nuffield, Southampton). Down the Dock Road (Chester Gateway). Mephistopheles in Doctor Faustus, Roderigo in Othello, Captain Plume in The Recruiting Officer and Lieutenant Clark in Our Country's Good by Timberlake Wertenbaker (Swan, Worcester). He played Jack Horsfall in Hull Truck Theatre's production of The Glee Club by Richard Cameron directed by Tessa Walker and Gryce in Derby Theatre's production of Kes directed by Sarah Brigham, and toured Britain in House of Ghosts, directed by Robin Herford.

His TV appearances include Graham Carpenter in Hollyoaks (for two years), Keith Nicholl in two series of The Manageress for Channel 4, Mr Christian in Tripper's Day (revived for two series as Slinger's Day) for ITV, Heartbeat, Kavanagh QC, Kiss Me Kate, Eleven Men Against Eleven, Underworld, Drop The Dead Donkey, Dream Team, Home is the Sailor, Anna Lee, Class Act, Doctors, Casualty, The Bill and Crossroads.

Radio plays include: Gavin in two series of Any Bloke by Gary Brown, Alex Wiltshire in one series of Saplings, The Archers, The Climb, The Waterloo Model, Poseidon's Gold, Gilbert Without Sullivan, Julie and the Prince, The Bribery Warehouse and The Music Teacher.

As a director, his productions include: Women in Love, Laurel and Hardy and Outside Edge for Derby Theatre, The Dreaming and The Tempest at Birmingham Crescent Theatre, The Secret Diary of Adrian Mole at the Rose Theatre, Ladybird for Bristol Old Vic Theatre School and A Christmas Carol, Guys and Dolls and The Comedy of Errors at the Drake Centre, Pangbourne. He has directed Alan Ayckbourn’s Time and Time Again for Frinton Summer Theatre and Howard Goodall and Charles Hart's 'The Dreaming' at the Union Theatre, Southwark.

Clarkson performed as Dr Dillamond in the musical Wicked at the Apollo Theatre, Victoria, London until 25 October 2014, and also understudied the Wizard of Oz. He assumed the position as Head of Acting Courses at Bristol Old Vic Theatre School on 27 October 2014.

He is married to actress Julia Hills, and the couple have three children.
