= Check It Out! (Canadian TV series) =

1985 CTV sitcom

- Genre: Sitcom
- Created by: Brian Cooke
- Developed by: Arne Sultan; Stuart Gillard
- Starring: Don Adams; Dinah Christie
- Composer: Russ Little
- Country of origin: Canada
- Original language: English
- No. of seasons: 3
- No. of episodes: 66

Production
- Executive producer: Charles Falzon
- Producers: Ben Gordon; Frank Peppiatt
- Camera setup: Multi-camera
- Running time: 30 minutes
- Production company: DLT Entertainment

Original release
- Network: CTV
- Release: September 21, 1985 – April 1, 1988

Related
- Tripper's Day; Slinger's Day; Full Frys

Check it Out! is a Canadian television sitcom that aired on CTV from September 1985 to April 1988. The series also aired in the United States in syndication and on the USA Network.

== Synopsis ==
Based on the British series Tripper's Day, Check It Out! was set in a fictional supermarket called Cobb's, located in Brampton, Ontario and stars Don Adams as manager Howard Bannister. The cast also included Dinah Christie, Henry Beckman, Gordon Clapp, Barbara Hamilton, Elizabeth Hanna, Kathleen Laskey, Jeff Pustil, Simon Reynolds, Aaron Schwartz and Tonya Williams. The series was taped in front of a studio audience at CFTO-TV in Toronto.

== Cast ==
- Don Adams as Howard Bannister
- Dinah Christie as Edna Moseley
- Aaron Schwartz as Leslie Rappaport
- Elizabeth Hanna as T.C. Collingwood (season 3)
- Tonya Williams as Jennifer Woods (season 1)
- Jeff Pustil as Jack Christian
- Kathleen Laskey as Marlene Weimaraner
- Henry Beckman as Alf (season 1)
- Simon Reynolds as Murray Amherst (seasons 1–2)
- Gordon Clapp as Viker

== Episodes ==
=== Series overview ===
Season	Episodes	Originally released	
Season	Episodes	First released	Last released
1	22	October 2, 1985	March 12, 1986
2	22	October 3, 1986	March 22, 1987
3	22	October 4, 1987	February 14, 1988

=== Season 1 (1985–86) ===
No. overall	No. in season	Title	Original release date
1	1	"No Security in Security"	October 2, 1985
When Cobb's grocery store has a new video security system installed, Manager Howard Bannister must fire Alf, the store's security guard of fifty years.
2	2	"Labor and Other Relations"	October 9, 1985
After Cobb's institutes a policy to cut coffee breaks, Marlene threatens to start a strike.
3	3	"No Cause for Alarm"	October 16, 1985
Howard gets an interview to become an assistant manager at a luxury hotel, but has to deal with a faulty security alarm keeping him from getting sleep.
4	4	"X-Ray Marks the Spot"	October 23, 1985
The employees are scheduled to get a physical exam and everyone reacts in different ways. Meanwhile, Edna thinks she may be pregnant with Howard's baby.
5	5	"Everyone's a Winner"	October 30, 1985
When the store holds a promotional bingo game with a free trip to Greece for the winner, a printing error on the cards could give every participant the grand prize.
6	6	"Seven Days Make One Week"	November 6, 1985
A sexy woman giving away samples in the store has all the men drooling, even Howard, which leaves Edna jealous.
7	7	"A Rosenbloom by Any Other Name"	November 13, 1985
When Jennifer thinks she is being denied a raise because she is black, she hires an attorney to sue for discrimination. Meanwhile, Howard deals with an elderly woman waiting outside the store.
8	8	"Or Get Off the Pot"	November 20, 1985
When Edna thinks her relationship with Howard has hit a dead end, she convinces him to go to a group therapy session to put it back on track.
9	9	"Phantom of the Market"	November 27, 1985
Before Howard can take a Hawaiian vacation, he has to find the culprit behind the disappearance of several thousand dollars' worth of gourmet food from the store.
10	10	"Car Pool"	December 4, 1985
When the head office takes away employee parking to make room for customers, Christian forms a carpool that leads to trouble.
11	11	"Love on Sale"	December 11, 1985
Murray starts a matchmaking service in the store to earn extra money for a used car, but his new venture lands Howard in jail before an important business meeting.
12	12	"Skip to the Loo"	December 18, 1985
When Howard is forced to give a job to the delinquent son of an old army buddy, he fears for his life when the young man is found dead in the meat locker. Meanwhile, a man tries breaking the jump rope record in the store.
13	13	"Love is a Many Splendored Alf"	January 8, 1986
Edna sets up Alf with an old friend of hers after the woman shows an interest in the security guard. Meanwhile, Howard has to deal with various electrical problems in the store and an inept electrician.
14	14	"Supermarket Superbowlers"	January 15, 1986
The store's bowling team has made it to the league finals, but when their best bowler Murray breaks his arm, Howard must decide whether or not to let team alternate Edna play.
15	15	"Otherwise Engaged"	January 22, 1986
Edna gets Marlene's new diamond ring stuck on her finger and her visiting mother thinks that she has become engaged.
16	16	"Store Wars"	January 29, 1986
A new store opens up across from Cobbs which leads to a price war. Meanwhile, Howard becomes attracted to the temp filling in for a vacationing Edna.
17	17	"Banzai"	February 1, 1986
18	18	"Dog Day After Dark"	February 8, 1986
It's Howard's birthday and the staff is planning a surprise party, but they're in for a bigger surprise when a group of protesters take them hostage.
19	19	"My Darling Serpentine"	February 19, 1986
It's the anniversary of Howard and Edna's first date and Howard sends Alf to get his present for her. Meanwhile, Murray becomes dejected when Marlene turns down his invitation to prom.
20	20	"Edna's New Friend"	February 26, 1986
21	21	"Jack Be Numbskull"	March 5, 1986
22	22	"Sex Appeal"	March 12, 1986

=== Season 2 (1986–87) ===
No. overall	No. in season	Title	Original release date
23	1	"Getting to Know You"	October 3, 1986
24	2	"Edna's Phantom Romance"	October 10, 1986
25	3	"Buddy Can You Spare a Job?"	October 17, 1986
26	4	"Operation Bannister"	October 24, 1986
27	5	"The Mis-Matchmaker"	October 31, 1986
28	6	"The Bear Facts"	November 7, 1986
29	7	"A Chocolate Chip Off the Old Block"	November 14, 1986
30	8	"Homewrecker Howard"	November 21, 1986
31	9	"Don't Take My Job, Please"	December 12, 1986
32	10	"Edna Displays Talent"	December 19, 1986
33	11	"Short One Jockey"	December 26, 1986
34	12	"High Tech"	January 11, 1987
35	13	"Love and Marriage"	January 18, 1987
36	14	"Let's Get Metaphysical"	January 25, 1987
37	15	"Tots 'R Us"	February 1, 1987
38	16	"The Oddest Couple"	February 8, 1987
39	17	"Chain Reaction"	February 15, 1987
40	18	"My Girl Friday, Saturday, Sunday"	February 22, 1987
41	19	"Only God Can Save a Tree"	March 1, 1987
42	20	"The Son Also Rises"	March 8, 1987
43	21	"Here Comes the Bribe"	March 15, 1987
44	22	"Put Your Best Face Forward"	March 22, 1987

=== Season 3 (1987–88) ===
No. overall	No. in season	Title	Original release date
45	1	"The Umpire Strikes Back"	October 4, 1987
46	2	"Hey, Take Me Over"	October 10, 1987
47	3	"Puppy Love"	October 11, 1987
48	4	"I'm Okay, You're a Spy"	October 17, 1987
49	5	"Not for Commercial Use"	October 18, 1987
50	6	"Edna's Choice"	October 24, 1987
51	7	"He's No Heavy, He's My Brother"	October 25, 1987
52	8	"Mutiny on Mr. Christian"	November 7, 1987
53	9	"Bannister & Dale"	November 14, 1987
54	10	"Shrink from Sendrax"	November 15, 1987
55	11	"The Naked Truth"	November 21, 1987
56	12	"Howard Hemingway"	November 22, 1987
57	13	"Edna, Howard, Cathy and Morty"	November 28, 1987
58	14	"Marlene for Hire"	December 12, 1987
59	15	"Make Room for Daddy Christian"	December 27, 1987
60	16	"My Hero, Mr. Bannister"	January 3, 1988
61	17	"Fatal Harassment"	January 10, 1988
62	18	"Vote for Me"	January 16, 1988
63	19	"Losing It"	January 30, 1988
64	20	"Smotherly Love"	January 31, 1988
65	21	"Educating Leslie"	February 7, 1988
66	22	"For the Book"	February 14, 1988

== Syndication ==
In 2008, four episodes of the series were featured on WGN America's "Outta Sight Retro Night" programming block. From 2013 to 2019, the program was seen on Comedy Gold in Canada daily. In 2023, the show is available to watch on Tubi and Pluto TV for free. The series is also available on Peacock.

== International titles ==
In Latin America the show was called Supermercado 99 ("Supermarket 99"), a reference to Barbara Feldon's character in Get Smart, while in Italy, the show was called Il supermercato più pazzo del mondo ("The craziest supermarket in the world").

In Sweden, comical duo Stefan & Krister star in Full Frys, a TV series largely based on Check it Out! and Tripper's Day.
