= Full Frys =

- Genre: Sitcom
- Created by: Stefan Gerhardsson; Krister Classon
- Country of origin: Sweden
- Original language: Swedish
- No. of seasons: 1
- No. of episodes: 12

Original release
- Network: TV4
- Release: 8 February – 26 April 1999

Related
- Tripper's Day; Slinger's Day; Check It Out!

Full Frys (Full Freezer) is a Swedish television sitcom by comedy/musical duo Stefan & Krister. One season of 12 episodes has been recorded, in 1998, and it was broadcast on the Swedish TV4 first in 1999, and later in 2000, 2003, 2011 and 2018. The complete series was released on a double DVD in 2003.

The series is based on the British television series Tripper's Day and its Canadian counterpart, Check it Out!.

== About the show ==
Sture Bergholm (Stefan Gerhardsson) has recently become the manager of Dolkens livs, a local grocery store in Falkenberg, Sweden. With it came also its employees, led by the alcoholic, and not too bright, Edvin Eriksson (Krister Claesson).

== Characters ==
=== Major characters ===
- Sture Bergholm -- the new manager of the store; he is always trying to advance in his career. He has been dating Evy (see below) for seven years, but they do not live together. In his youth, he used to wrestle. Being the manager he is always ultimately responsible for all mishaps, much to his chagrin, as there are quite a lot of them.
- Edvin Eriksson -- the supervisor of the employees. He is 45 years old and is extremely stupid. He causes much disorder and trouble with his schemes. He is also an alcoholic and spends much of his time at work trying to hide liquor at various places (in ketchup bottles or oranges). He also makes stupid or poor jokes at which no one laughs but himself. He drives an orange Volvo Duett, which, among other things, misses a steering wheel. He is married to Beatrice, who is very much like him, and together they have a one eyed cat named Fritz.
- Evy Karlsson -- Sture's girlfriend and secretary of the store, often acting as a voice of reason. Her lovelife with Sture often gets messed up, but ultimately they always end up more in love than before. She is played by Annika Andersson.
- Rasmus Lindblad -- the youngest of the employees, at only 16 years of age. His typical chores is to load groceries from the stock into the store. The reason why he's working at the store is never explained, but it could be that he either flunked out of school or is there on TET. He focuses mainly on having sex, wanting to lose his virginity, but never seeming to make it happen. He is played by Andreas Andersson.
- Nillan Niedenberger -- the store's cashier who spends most of her time arranging her make-up. She is cocky and sarcastic at what Sture says, she has a good relation to Larry. She is played by Hanna Norman.
- Larry -- Larry's duties are a mix of those of Rasmus' and Nillan's, spending time both in the store and at the cash register. He is an openly homosexual man, and is always nice to everyone. When Rasmus has troubles, Larry will help him. He once had a complete collection of a magazine named 'Årets badpojke' (This year's bathing boy), but a former boyfriend, Jan-Åke, took it with him when they separated. He is played by Håkan Berg.
- Ebba Dolk --- the owner of the chain of Dolkens livs, and sometimes makes visits in the store. Often screaming "Bergholm!" from off screen to get Sture's attention. She is almost always angry (almost furious), and has many ideas in how to make the store run better. She once owned a poodle, which Edvin ran over with a floor polisher. It did however "stop barking", he said. She is played by Siw Carlsson.

=== Minor characters ===
- Edgar Petterson, a sadistic accountant who comes to the store, when it's missing gourmet food for a great value.
- Tilda Dolk is the daughter of owner Ebba Dolk, she comes to inspect how Sture performs at his job, when he is up for a promotion, she ends up trying to seduce him, which puts Sture in a fight with both Evy and Mrs. Dolk.
- Beatrice Eriksson is Edvins wife, and she is just as stupid as him.
- Helen Andersson, a friend of Evy, she is visiting her and drops by the store where she is immediately starts to like Edvin. She, along with Evy and Sture, has Edvin over for dinner. A very, very, catastrophic dinner...

=== Never seen characters ===
- Bernt is Edvins cousin, and seems to be as stupid as Edvin, he often has a role in Edvins ideas, pretty much always starting the whole thing.
- Nisse is a friend of Edvin, if he can so be called. It is revealed that he once buried Edvin, who was stupid enough not to realize the danger. He also strangles Edvin with a brown scarf.
- Bertilsson is a local farmer, who is in possession of an old tractor, which at one time crushes Stures new BMW.

== Episodes ==
1. . Vinnare är vi allihopa (We're all winners)
2. . Gökuret (The cuckoo clock)
3. . Röntgenblick önskas (X-ray vision please)
4. . Operation: Sture
5. . Evy ställer ut (Evy's exhibit)
6. . Samåkning (Carpooling)
7. . Glasskampen (The ice cream struggle)
8. . Ropen skalla (The cries be heard)
9. . Evys nya vän (Evy's new friend)
10. . Inga delikatesser (No delicacies)
11. . Sex och hamstrar (Sex and guinea pigs)
12. . Just ett snyggt par (One nice couple)
