= Vol-au-vent (film) =

- Directed by: John McKenzie
- Starring: Dennis Waterman; Julia McKenzie; Lisa Coleman
- Release date: 1996
- Country: United Kingdom
- Language: English

Vol-au-vent is a 1996 British comedy film directed by John McKenzie and starring Dennis Waterman, Julia McKenzie, and Lisa Coleman. Its plot concerns an upper-middle class wedding that is interrupted by three jewel thieves on the run from the law.

== Cast ==
- Dennis Waterman as Pete/Kevin
- Julia McKenzie as Audrey
- Lisa Coleman as Christine
- Joanne Engelsman as Samantha
- Joanna Wyatt as Allison
- John Hug as Mark
- Brian Mitchell as Dave/De Alan
- Nick Bayly as Smokes/Alan
- Tim Mills as Paul
- Robert Ashby as Toby
- Victoria Burnham as Tracy
- Peter Mair as Ernest
- Bruce Douglas as Policeman
- David Credell as DS Ellis
- Peter Coles, Robert Moseley and Kester Phelps as Church Ushers
- Jonathan Sloman as Parrot
