= Andrew Paul =

English actor

- Born: Paul Andrew Herman; 17 March 1961 (age 65); Mile End, London, England
- Occupation: Actor
- Years active: 1975–present
- Spouse: Laura Paul (m. 1985)
- Children: 3

Andrew Paul (born Paul Andrew Herman; 17 March 1961 in Mile End, London) is an English actor, known for portraying PC Dave Quinnan in the ITV drama The Bill for 13 years. He is also known for his other roles in EastEnders as Maxwell Moon and Coronation Street as Dan Jones.

== Life and career ==
Paul grew up in Manor House, North London, attending Clissold Park Secondary School, Hackney, from the age of 11. He played a member of a gang in "The Destructors", a 1975 episode of the TV series Shades of Greene. At the age of 14, he enrolled at the Anna Scher Theatre School. He appeared in the film Bugsy Malone at 14 and in an episode of the police drama The Sweeney at the age of 16. In 1978, he played Paul Ross in Trevor Preston's innovative crime drama Out. A year later, he took the background role of convict Betts in the cinematic re-make of the controversial borstal film Scum. Betts' character was notable in the film, as he was the only one seen to be released, albeit temporarily, for his wedding.

In 1980, he appeared in "On His Back" a UK government public information film discouraging drinking and driving. He played the role of a formerly disqualified driver struggling to get insurance. He spent much of the 1980s on stage, working with the Royal Shakespeare Company, and played a major role in Going Out, which is about a group of teenagers in the Portsmouth area. He took a part in the 'lukewarmly' received ITV sitcom Tripper's Day in 1984. Set in a supermarket, this was the final television work undertaken by the distinguished British actor Leonard Rossiter prior to his sudden death. Paul stayed in the series when it was re-cast with Bruce Forsyth two years later and renamed Slinger's Day. In 1989, he appeared as an arson suspect in the tenth episode of Inspector Morse.

=== The Bill ===
In 1989, he joined The Bill, a long-running police serial, as PC Dave Quinnan. He had previously appeared as a witness to a crime in series 3, in the episode titled "Missing, Presumed Dead". When the series decided to focus more on the officers themselves and less on crime, Quinnan was given a number of serious story lines. These included being stabbed and beaten up by a gang of youths and having to spend several weeks in hospital on a drip, falling in love and having an affair with a colleague's girlfriend (and marrying her after the affair became public), and then having an extramarital relationship with PC Polly Page (played by Lisa Geoghan). The character was eventually transferred after successfully undertaking undercover work. This move was tied to Paul's decision to leave The Bill after 13 years.

=== Later work ===
He briefly played Maxwell Moon in the popular BBC soap opera EastEnders and went on to be a regular cast member in Where the Heart Is, playing Billy Boothe, until the series was axed in 2006. He guest starred in City Homicide and Dracula. He appeared in the ITV series of Lewis shown on ITV and ITV3 in 2014.

In June 2015, Paul started appearing in Coronation Street as the brewery worker Dan Jones, a love interest for Liz McDonald (Beverley Callard).

On 29 October 2016, he made a guest appearance in Casualty. In 2017, he guest starred in the fifth and final season of Episodes. In 2018, in an episode of ITV's Endeavour titled "Quartet", he played Joe Dozier, a tobacconist/drinker/wife-beater who was part of an embedded spy ring in Oxford. This appearance makes him one of the few actors to have had parts in all three Inspector Morse series. Then in October 2022, he appeared in an episode of the BBC soap opera Doctors as Terry Bedford. In 2025, Paul appeared in the new series of ITV's Unforgotten.

== Personal life ==
Andrew has been married to Laura Paul since 1985. They have three boys together whom he has kept out of the public domain.

== Filmography ==
=== Television ===
Year	Title	Role	Notes
1987	Mister Corbett's Ghost	Villager	Television film
1989	Inspector Morse	Suspect Interviewee	Series 3 Episode 3 Deceived by Flight
1989–2002	The Bill	PC Dave Quinnan	716 episodes
2003–2006	Where the Heart Is	Billy Boothe	36 episodes
2022	Doctors	Terry Bedford	1 episode

=== Film ===
Year	Title	Role	Notes
1976	Bugsy Malone	O'Dreary	
1979	Scum	Betts	
1983	The Pirates of Penzance	Pirate #10	
1987	Bellman and True	Young Security Guard	
2012	The Telemachy	Antony	
