= Articulation (painting) =

Painting by Euan Uglow, 1993–1996

- Artist: Euan Uglow
- Year: 1993–1996
- Catalogue: 370
- Medium: Oil painting on canvas
- Dimensions: 43.8 cm × 89.5 cm (17.2 in × 35.2 in)

Articulation is a painting by Euan Uglow, started in 1993 and finished in 1996. It an oil painting on canvas and features a reclining nude woman with her back to the viewer, with a tree branch in the background. The model is actress Lisa Coleman, who attended Uglow's studio one to three times a week during the period, and reflected positively on her experience.

A 1997 exhibition of Uglow's work at the Browse & Darby gallery in London sparked critical praise for the artist. Critics highlighted Uglow's classical approach to the human form in describing him as one of Britain's finest classical painters of the nude, and images of Articulation were used to illustrate several reviews of his exhibitions.

== Background ==
Euan Uglow (1932–2000) was a British painter best known for his paintings of nude women and still lifes. He painted only from life, often taking several years to complete his artworks. His nude models typically posed in unnatural and often uncomfortable positions. Uglow would use markings including chalk lines and plumb lines in his studio to maintain consistency across painting sessions. His pictures, like those of his tutor William Coldstream, often contained measurement marks.

Although he rarely exhibited his works, apart from shows at his representatives every few years, he had solo shows at the Whitechapel Gallery in 1974 and 1989, and at Salander-O'Reilly in New York in 1993. Uglow was sometimes not specific about what attracted him to particular images or people, and could be a combative interviewee. The art scholar Richard Kendall described him as "often suspicious of words ... His eloquence was in his pictures".

The model for Articulation was actress Lisa Coleman, who was modelling for the first time, to earn money. She had been in an episode of Crown Court in 1977 when she was aged six, and in single episodes of Casualty and EastEnders in 1990, among other television appearances.

== Painting ==
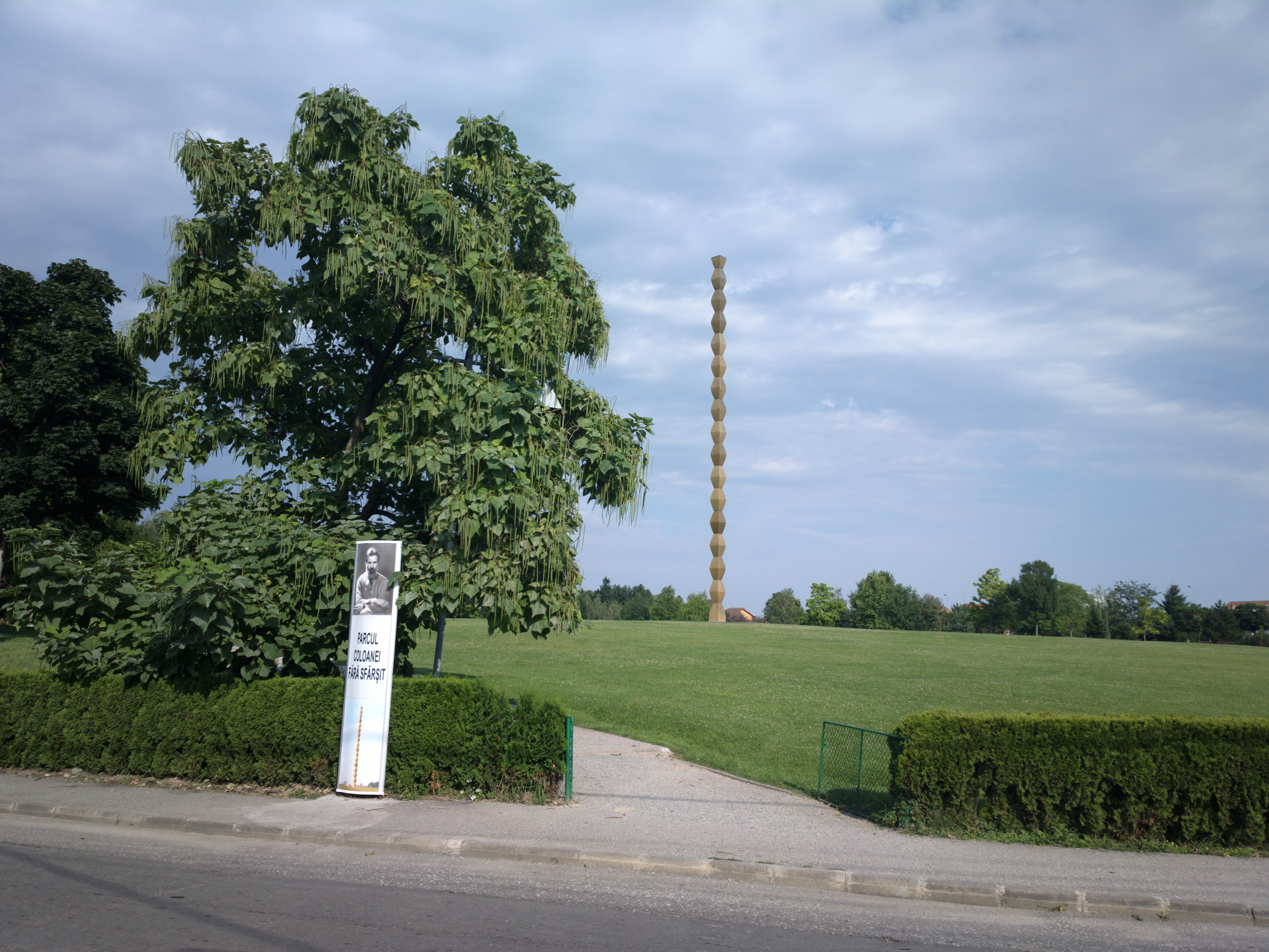
Uglow compared the form of The Endless Column by Constantin Brâncuși to aspects of Articulation.

A graphite on paper study for Articulation from about 1992, measuring 318mm by 450mm, is held by the British Museum. The study was purchased by Hamish Parker from Marlborough Fine Art and later accepted by the UK Government under the Cultural Gifts Scheme and allocated to the British Museum. The Museum's catalogue record describes the content as a "reclining nude female figure with her back to the viewer, framed in a rectangle". The composition of this study closely resembles the layout of the final painting.

In 2000, Uglow recalled that "I made a little model of [Articulation]. I just thought she looked so beautiful — the way every bit was articulated so simply. Like, that's that, that's that. The way the forms just fitted into each other, like the soles of her feet." He compared this arrangement with The Endless Column by Constantin Brâncuși, which he had seen on a trip to Romania in 1992. The background of the picture includes a small tree branch that Uglow had collected, which also features in his Girl with White Tree (1986).

Uglow regarded his Nude with Green Background (1964–65) as one of his first "really serious" paintings, and remarked that "You can see the easy movement from there to the back view of Articulation, very simple, I hope so." Articulation is an oil painting on canvas that was started in 1993 and finished in 1996, and measures 43.8 cm high by 89.5 cm wide. The 2007 Catalogue Raisonné for Uglow shows the work as belonging to the private collector Douglas Woolf.

Coleman, new to modelling, recalled travelling to Uglow's studio one to three times a week, and described how despite initially feeling "prudish", she later felt relaxed during the sessions, found them "liberating", and came to regard Uglow as a friend. Lucinda Bredin interviewed Uglow in his studio for The Sunday Telegraph in 1994. At the time, he had five different fixed set-ups for different paintings of models there. He told Bredin that progress on one of his paintings had been disrupted because the model had been cast in a television show. Coleman joined Casualty as a regular cast member that year, and continued in the role until 1997.

Discussing the process of painting Articulation, Uglow said, "It was supposed to be very light, the light came down just on her. In fact to paint it that lightly I had to able to make the canvas lighter. It was behind me. There's the model, there's the canvas, there's me [sketch]." Uglow and Coleman discussed his technique with respect to a pear that he had been painting and which he gifted to her. Coleman commented that "I treasure it as a lesson in the concept that he did not paint to produce pictures, but that they were by-products of his quest to capture the perfect fall of light", and that, despite being naked, she felt fully comfortable, due to "being viewed in a completely different way from how society normally judges the female form".

== Critical reception ==
Critics have praised Uglow's classical approach to the human form in describing him as one of Britain's finest classical painters of the nude, and images of Articulation were used to illustrate several reviews of his exhibitions.

Articulation was included in an exhibition of Uglow's work at the Browse & Darby gallery in London in 1997. In Modern Painters, David Sylvester reviewed the exhibition positively. He referred to Articulation as a simple composition "in silvery tones of a reclining woman, deeply classical and serene", and felt that with Uglow's nudes, "The curves of the woman's body are no more important than the curves of the geometric design of the linoleum". Uglow similarly claimed that he did not distinguish between painting a live model as against another subject; this assertion was challenged by critic Adrian Searle.

Martin Gayford of The Daily Telegraph felt that despite the long time Uglow took to complete his paintings, they were "fresh". Gayford argued that reflecting reality in a truthful way in a painting was a painstaking process; he commended "the softly rounded forms of the model's lower back and bottom" represented by "flat patches of mauve, pinky-grey and buff" in Articulation. His article was accompanied by an image of the painting.

Tim Hilton named Uglow "Best Artist of the Year" in his retrospective article in The Independent; the single image included was of Articulation. The painting was also the only picture used in William Packer's review of the exhibition in The Financial Times. The caption expressed the opinion that Uglow was "the best truly classical painter of the nude" in Britain at the time.

The exhibition The Enduring Image: The Tradition of the Human Figure in Twentieth Century British Art as Abbot Hall Art Gallery, Kendal in 2003 included Articulation. Reviewing an exhibition of Uglow's paintings at the same venue later that year, Searle wrote in The Guardian that he found Uglow's work "lifeless". Searle complained about the emphasis in the paintings on the difficulty of producing them and remarked that "the act of looking and recording is presented as a joyless test".

== Exhibitions ==
The following is a list of known exhibitions of the painting and its preparatory study.

Articulation

- Euan Uglow, Browse & Darby, London, 1997
- The Enduring Image: The Tradition of the Human Figure in Twentieth Century British Art, Abbot Hall Art Gallery, Kendal, 2003
- Euan Uglow, Hazlitt Holland-Hibbert, London, 2024

Study for Articulation

- Euan Uglow: Drawings, Marlborough, London, 2014
- Art on paper since 1960: The Hamish Parker Collection, British Museum, London, 2022–23
