= How Do You Want Me? =

- Created by: Simon Nye
- Starring: Dylan Moran; Charlotte Coleman
- Country of origin: United Kingdom
- Original language: English
- No. of series: 2
- No. of episodes: 12

Production
- Running time: 30 minutes

Original release
- Network: BBC Two
- Release: 24 February 1998 – 22 December 1999

How Do You Want Me? is a British television sitcom, produced by Kensington Films & Television, written by Simon Nye, and directed by John Henderson.

== Plot ==
Dylan Moran starred as boy next door Ian Lyons, who recently eloped with country girl Lisa Yardley (Charlotte Coleman). At the show's start, after a year living in London they move to the village of Snowle, where her intimidating father (Frank Finlay) breeds turkeys. He and most of Lisa's family (which included Emma Chambers as her sister and Peter Serafinowicz as her thuggish brother) take a strong dislike to Ian, and much of the comedy comes from how Ian copes with life with her family and village life in general. The situation is also complicated by Lisa's ex-boyfriend Derek (Mark Heap), who still loves her.

The series' title is a reference to the trade Ian takes up within the village, buying the business of the local photographer despite having no formal training in photography (he had previously managed a comedy club in London). Photography plays an important part within the stories; the beginning of series one shows Ian and Lisa outside a country church having wedding photos taken; this is then shown to be a staged event arranged by Lisa's family due to their unhappiness at them eloping and marrying abroad prior to the series starting. Ian first realises the extent of the family's hatred for him when he witnesses Lisa's mother cutting him out of the wedding pictures at the end of the first episode. Further episodes also have photography playing a key role, including an episode where nude photos of Lisa get circulated around the village after her brother and his friends discover them. Another episode sees Lisa's sister approach Ian for a photo shoot, and her disappointment when he is unable to photograph her looking glamorous and beautiful. There is a running joke throughout the series of Ian wanting to make a book of photographs of country fire stations in Britain.

Series 2 ends with Ian and Lisa sitting in their car debating whether to leave the village; Ian cannot bear to live there any more due to the repeated aggression shown by Lisa's family to him, but Lisa does not want to live in London.

== Cast ==
- Dylan Moran as Ian Lyons
- Charlotte Coleman as Lisa Lyons
- Frank Finlay as Astley Yardley, Lisa's father
- Diana Fairfax as Pam Yardley, Lisa's mother
- Emma Chambers as Helen Yardley, Lisa's sister
- Peter Serafinowicz as Dean Yardley, Lisa's brother
- Simon Bateson as Warren Yardley, Lisa's brother
- Mark Heap as Derek Few
- Clive Merrison as Norriswood
- Geraldine McNulty as Honor Deacon

== Episodes ==
There were two series of How Do You Want Me?, broadcast in 1998 and 1999, each with six episodes.

=== Series 1 (1998) ===
The first series was broadcast at 10pm on Tuesdays, from 24 February until 31 March 1998.

No. overall	No. in series	Title	Original release date
1	1	"No One Can Hear You Scream"	24 February 1998
Ian leaves the Comedy Club circuit behind when he elopes with country girl Lisa. They return to her hometown of Snowle, where her relatives are less than friendly towards him. Ian later decides to buy the photography business off the retiring Mr. Webb, whilst trying to work out a way to strive in this hostile new world.
2	2	"Floppy But Not Too Floppy"	3 March 1998
Ian tries to secure the contract for Snowle Primary School's school photograph, meanwhile Astley devises a plan to remove his son-in-law once and for all from his daughter's life.
3	3	"Monstrous"	10 March 1998
Snowle's football team is gearing up to play local rivals Penfold. Dean wants Ian to play in goal, but his tales of previous brutal encounters puts him off from playing. Dean discovers Ian's topless pictures of Lisa and puts them up all over the village.
4	4	"Woof!"	17 March 1998
Helen is trying to raise funds for the League of Ponies charity, and she asks Ian to invite a stand-up comedian for a charity gig. Mark Piggot agrees to appear but misjudges his audience, who give him a cold reception. Lisa organises a dinner party and attempts set up her former boyfriend Derek Few with Jill.
5	5	"The Hidden World of Country Fire Stations"	24 March 1998
Ian plans to write a book called the World of Country Fire Stations, so he subsequently visits the Snowle Fire Service station where Dean tells him he should go out with them on their rounds. Ian is alarmed to learn that they go out on pre-arranged calls to get paid a fee for their services.
6	6	"Sausage, Balloon, Bum"	31 March 1998
During a photoshoot, Ian slaps schoolboy Justin Howard. The police start to investigate Ian for assaulting a minor, and he is now viewed by everyone as the village disciplinarian. When Lisa arranges for him to apologise to Justin, everything comes to a head.

=== Series 2 (1999) ===
The second series was broadcast at 10pm on Wednesdays, from 10 November until 22 December 1999.

No. overall	No. in series	Title	Original release date
7	1	"White Pubic Hair"	10 November 1999
After an afternoon in the pub, Ian goes off to Astley's farm to take some photos of the site. A ladder has been left by the barn, so he climbs onto the roof but soon falls off. He starts to believe his father-in-law wanted him to fall, but Lisa does not believe his claims.
8	2	"I'm Not An Alcoholic"	17 November 1999
Norriswood offers Ian a position as a school governor, but his joy is ultimately short lived when he crosses his father-in-law at his board meeting. Dean then gives Ian the chance to let his hair down, but it involves a lot of heavy drinking.
9	3	"Nude Modelling Module"	24 November 1999
Ian decides to advertise for a photographic teaching course which includes a nude modelling module. Susanna Grave develops a crush on Ian, so he appeals to Lisa to help let her down gently. Ian is pressurised by his class to find a nude model.
10	4	"The Bad Builders"	8 December 1999
Dean is doing building work at Derek Few's house, but he refuses to finish the job. Derek is cracking up, so Lisa tries to persuade Dean to finish it. Helen is going on holiday, so Ian is coaxed to help Jill in the shop, however her new candles later set fire to the place.
11	5	"Ready Steady Kill"	15 December 1999
Lisa wants Ian to bond with her father by accepting his offer to go clay pigeon shooting. Ian is cautious about this, having already escaped death once before. Lisa reveals that Helen is looking for romance and now has to fend off offers from Dean's friends.
12	6	"The Pleasures of Village Life"	22 December 1999
After her father is accidentally shot at the shoot, Lisa and Ian are living apart from each other. Ian has been sleeping in his photo studio but later moves in with Dean. Fearing for Ian's health, Lisa allows Helen to arrange for the pair to meet up and save their marriage.

== Media releases ==
"How Do You Want Me?: The Complete Collection" was released on DVD in the UK on 3 July 2006.

In 2010, The Guardian ranked the serial at number 16 in their list of "The Top 50 TV Dramas of All Time".
