= Charlotte Coleman =

British actress (1968–2001)

- Coleman as Scarlett in Four Weddings and a Funeral, 1994
- Born: Charlotte Ninon Coleman; 3 April 1968; Westminster, Greater London, England
- Died: 14 November 2001 (aged 33); Islington, Greater London, England
- Education: Anna Scher Theatre
- Occupation: Actress
- Years active: 1977–2001
- Notable work: Four Weddings and a Funeral (1994)
- Partner: John Laycock (1984–1987; his death)
- Parents: Francis Coleman (father); Ann Beach (mother)
- Relatives: Lisa Coleman (sister)

Charlotte Ninon Coleman (3 April 1968 – 14 November 2001) was an English actress who began her career as a child actress. The elder daughter of Francis Coleman and Ann Beach, she was best known for her role as Scarlett in the romantic comedy film Four Weddings and a Funeral (1994).

== Early life and education ==
Charlotte Ninon Coleman was born on 3 April 1968 at Charing Cross Hospital in Strand, London. She was the elder of two daughters born to Francis Coleman, a Canadian television producer, and his wife, Ann Beach, a British actress. Her younger sister, Lisa Coleman, also pursued a career as an actress. Her father was born in Montreal to an Irish father and a French mother. She was raised in the Muswell Hill area of North London. She left the family home at age 14 to live with friends.

=== Education ===
Coleman began her primary education at St Michael's Primary School in Highgate before enrolling at the Camden School for Girls. From the age of eight, she balanced her academic studies with evening acting workshops at the Anna Scher Theatre in Islington. At age 15, she was expelled from the Camden School for Girls for smoking and drinking on school grounds. Following her expulsion, she funded her own alternative secondary education, enrolling at Dartington Hall School, a progressive boarding school in Devon, from which she graduated in 1985. After graduation, she temporarily paused professional acting to pursue formal studies in cookery and the history of art.

== Career ==
=== Early career and child roles (1977–1988) ===
Coleman began her professional acting career at the age of eight. After attending classes at the Anna Scher Theatre, she secured her first television role as Emma Moffat in the ITV drama series Two People (1979). Shortly thereafter, she was cast as Sue Peters in the children's series Worzel Gummidge, appearing regularly from 1979 to 1981.

Her breakthrough childhood role was the rebellious protagonist Marmalade Atkins. She first portrayed the character in the television film Marmalade Atkins in Space (1981), before starring in two subsequent spin-off series, Educating Marmalade (1982–1983) and Danger: Marmalade at Work (1984).

In October 1987, she expanded into stage acting, appearing at the Royal National Theatre's stage Cottesloe as Sophie and Lizzie Sibley in David Edgar's play Entertaining Strangers. During this decade, she also made guest appearances in British television dramas, including The Bill and Inspector Morse.

=== Transition to adult roles and critical success (1989–1995) ===
At age 21, Coleman transitioned to adult roles when she was cast as Jess in the BBC television miniseries Oranges Are Not the Only Fruit (1990), adapted from Jeanette Winterson's semi-autobiographical novel. Her performance as a young woman growing up in a strict Pentecostal household earned significant critical acclaim. The series won multiple BAFTA awards, and she was nominated for the BAFTA TV Award for Best Actress. For her portrayal, she won the Royal Television Society Programme Award for Best Actor – Female in 1991.

In 1990, she starred alongside Anne Bancroft in the television comedy series Freddie and Max. She also worked in independent film, appearing in Bearskin: An Urban Fairytale (1989) and Map of the Human Heart (1992).

In April 1991, she returned to the stage at the Bush Theatre to play the teenage Lorna in Roy MacGregor's play Our Own Kind, starring alongside Kevin Whately, Nisha Nayar, and Jane Horrocks.

Coleman achieved international recognition for her performance in the romantic comedy film Four Weddings and a Funeral (1994). She portrayed Scarlett, the eccentric flatmate of Charles (played by Hugh Grant). The film became a major global box office success, and she received a nomination for the BAFTA Film Award for Best Actress in a Supporting Role. Following this, she played Winnie in the dark comedy film The Young Poisoner's Handbook (1995).

=== Later work (1996–2001) ===
Coleman balanced film, television, and theatre work throughout the late 1990s, while expanding her presence in audio drama. In 1996, she played Alison in the comedy-drama film Different for Girls and took on the role of Barb Gale in the political satire Giving Tongue. She also starred as Lisa Lyons alongside Dylan Moran in the BBC sitcom How Do You Want Me? (1998–1999).

In September 1998, Coleman took on a prominent radio role on BBC Radio 4, starring as Val McDermid's private investigator Kate Brannigan in the audio adaptation of the thriller Clean Break. Her subsequent film projects included roles in the romantic comedy The Man with Rain in His Shoes (1998), the comedy film Sweet Revenge (1998), and the animated feature Faeries (1999), to which she lent her voice. In 1999, she co-starred as Portia Thornton in the BBC comedy-drama series Beautiful People.

In 2001, Coleman completed work on the independent films Bodywork and A Loving Act. Her later audio work included starring as the historical figure Maria Manning in John Fletcher's BBC Radio 4 drama Black Maria (2001). Her final professional acting appearance was as a primary cast member in the television film Double Act (2002), a Channel 4 adaptation of Jacqueline Wilson's children's novel, which aired posthumously.

== Personal life ==
In June 1987, Coleman's partner, Jonathan Alan Laycock, died at the age of 21 after being struck by a lorry while cycling on Farringdon Road in Clerkenwell, London. His death had a significant impact on her mental health; she later recalled that she experienced depression and developed the eating disorders anorexia and bulimia, which affected her health for several years. Following his death, Laycock's mother, Christine Mangat (née Nutbeem), became a prominent campaigner and founding member of RoadPeace, the UK national charity for road crash victims.

Coleman maintained a close relationship with her younger sister, actress Lisa Coleman, and frequently rejected media narratives of professional rivalry between them. She also rejected media narratives of nepotism.

== Death and legacy ==
On the evening of 13 November 2001, she visited her parents at their home in North London. Despite mentioning that she was feeling unwell, she returned to her flat in Holloway. The following morning, on 14 November, her parents became concerned after being unable to contact her by telephone. Her mother visited the property and discovered Coleman lying unconscious on the floor. An ambulance was called, and she was transported to Whittington Hospital in Archway, where she was pronounced dead on arrival at the age of 33.

A post-mortem examination determined that the cause of death was acute bronchial asthma. Although Coleman had managed chronic, mild asthma throughout her life, her family stated she had never previously suffered a major or life-threatening attack. Following a funeral service, she was privately cremated on 21 November 2001. A memorial service was later held at the Mill Hill Buddhist Centre in North London, attended by family, friends, and colleagues from the British entertainment industry.

=== Tributes and legacy ===
Following her death, the Coleman family received hundreds of tribute messages from colleagues and fans internationally. In December 2001, they published an open letter expressing gratitude for the public support. That same month, the family established the annual Charlotte Coleman Scholarship Award at the New London Performing Arts Centre (NLPAC) in Muswell Hill. Granted through an audition process to teenagers demonstrating exceptional potential in drama and musical theatre, the scholarship covers the cost of a full year of performing arts tuition.

In 2002, Coleman was honoured by the British Academy of Film and Television Arts (BAFTA) at both of their major annual ceremonies. In February, she was featured in the "In Memoriam" tribute segment at the 55th British Academy Film Awards for her contributions to cinema. In April, she was included in the "In Memoriam" segment at the 2002 British Academy Television Awards, recognising her work in television.

In 2019, the surviving cast of Four Weddings and a Funeral reunited for a short film sequel titled One Red Nose Day and a Wedding, produced for Comic Relief to mark the 25th anniversary of the original film. The television special included an explicit tribute to Coleman and her character, Scarlett.

== Acting credits and accolades ==
=== Filmography ===
Year	Title	Role	Notes	Ref.
1979	Two People	Emma Moffat	5 episodes	
1979–1981	Worzel Gummidge	Sue Peters	28 episodes	
1981	Theatre Box	Marmalade Atkins	Episode: "Marmalade Atkins in Space"	
1982–1983	Educating Marmalade	Marmalade Atkins	10 episodes	
1983	Children's ITV	Herself, Marmalade Atkins	Episode: "Episode #1.64"	
1983	The Sooty Story: The First Thirty Years	Herself	Television special	
1984	Danger: Marmalade at Work	Marmalade Atkins	10 episodes	
1986	The Two of Us	Mohawk Girl	Episode: "Cracks in the Pavement"	
1986–1987, 1995	Screen Two	Seamstress, Helen Bardsley, Louise	3 episodes	
1987	Scene	Soo	Episode: "Janna: Where Are You?"	
1988	Campaign	Kim Greenbank	3 episodes	
1989	The Dark Angel	Millie Ruthyn	Episode: "Episode #1.2"	
1989	The Play on One	Irene Blakely	Episode: "A View of Harry Clark"	
1989	Bearskin: An Urban Fairytale	Kate		
1989	Inappropriate Behaviour	Helen Bardsley		
1990	Oranges Are Not the Only Fruit	Jess	3 episodes	
1990	Screen One	Ros	Episode: "Sweet Nothing"	
1990	Freddie and Max	Freddie Latham	6 episodes	
1991	End of the Road a Film About First Love	Young Woman	Short film	
1992	Jackanory	Storyteller	5 episodes	
1992	Inspector Morse	Jessica White	Episode: "Happy Families"	
1992	Map of the Human Heart	Julie		
1992	The Bill	Sharon Palmer	Episode: "Happy Families"	
1992	Breathing	Actress	Short film	
1993	The Comic Strip Presents...	Patsy	Episode: "Gregory: Diary of a Nutcase"	
1993	Olly's Prison	Sheila	Television film	
1994	Four Weddings and a Funeral	Scarlett		
1994	Stages	Mary	Episode: "Low Level Panic"	
1994	Pirates	Gail Fleshly	2 episodes	
1994	Southern Gold	Herself	Episode: "Episode #2.5"	
1994	The Series from Hell	Herself	2 episodes	
1995	The Young Poisoner's Handbook	Winnie		
1995	The Vacillations of Poppy Carew	Mary		
1995	Oliver's Travels	Cathy	2 episodes	
1996	Different for Girls	Alison		
1996	George Melly's Owning Up	Sandra, Mrs. Rimsky-Korsacov, Doreen	3 episodes	
1996–1997	Gayle's World	Lucinda Beanie-Toffingham	Shorts	
1996	Giving Tongue	Barb Gale	Television film	
1997	Wycliffe	Laura Kessell	Episode: "Bad Blood"	
1997–2000	Brambly Hedge	Primrose Woodmouse, Poppy Dogwood	5 episodes	
1998	Shark Hunt	Actress	Television film	
1998	Sweet Revenge	Norma		
1998	The Man with Rain in His Shoes	Alison Hayes		
1998–1999	How Do You Want Me?	Lisa Lyons	12 episodes	
1999	Beautiful People	Portia Thornton		
1999	Faeries	Merrivale		
1999	Love in the 21st Century	Actress	Short film	
2000	It's Only TV...but I Like It	Herself	Episode: "Episode #2.8"	
2001	McCready and Daughter	Shelley Bennett	Episode: "No Bed of Roses"	
2001	Bodywork	Tiffany Shades		
2001	A Loving Act	Det. Jane Thompson	Television film	
2002	Double Act	Miss Debenham	Television film; Posthumous release	

=== Awards and nominations ===
Year	Award	Category	Nominated work	Result
1991	Royal Television Society Programme Awards	Best Actor – Female	Oranges Are Not the Only Fruit	Won
1991	BAFTA TV Awards	Best Actress	Oranges Are Not the Only Fruit	Nominated
1995	BAFTA Film Awards	Best Actress in a Supporting Role	Four Weddings and a Funeral	Nominated
