= Tripper's Day =

1984 British TV sitcom

- Written by: Brian Cooke
- Directed by: Michael Mills
- Starring: Leonard Rossiter; Pat Ashton; Gordon Gostelow; Philip Bird; Charon Bourke; Paul Clarkson; Liz Crowther; David John; Vicky Licorish; Andrew Paul
- Country of origin: United Kingdom
- Original language: English
- No. of series: 1
- No. of episodes: 6

Production
- Producer: Thames Television
- Running time: 30 minutes

Original release
- Network: ITV
- Release: 24 September – 29 October 1984

Related
- Slinger's Day; Check It Out! Full Frys

Tripper's Day is a British television sitcom produced by Thames Television for ITV. The plot centres on Leonard Rossiter as Norman Tripper, a northern manager assigned to a London supermarket with problematic staff. The programme received poor reviews and also suffered from the death of Rossiter between the broadcast of the second and third episodes.

The series was brought back two years later with Bruce Forsyth in the lead role, under the new title Slinger's Day. In Canada, the series had a remake under the title Check it Out! (1985–1988), which also aired in syndication in the United States. In Sweden, comical duo Stefan & Krister starred in Full Frys, a TV series largely based on Tripper's Day and Check it Out!. The last two episodes were transmitted on the original dates only in the London area due to strike action at Thames Television which stopped them from being networked.

== Episodes ==
No.	Title	Directed by	Written by	Original release date
1	"Special Offers"	Anthony Parker	Brian Cooke	24 September 1984
2	"Foreign Parts"	Michael Mills	Brian Cooke	1 October 1984
3	"Games People Play"	Michael Mills	Brian Cooke	8 October 1984
4	"Token of Esteem"	Michael Mills	Brian Cooke	15 October 1984
5	"Alarms and Diversions"	Michael Mills	Brian Cooke	22 October 1984
6	"Vatman and Robbin"	Michael Mills	Brian Cooke	29 October 1984

== Home release ==
The complete series of Tripper's Day was released on DVD on 20 September 2010.
