= Marmalade Atkins =

Fictional character created by Andrew Davies

- First appearance: Marmalade and Rufus
- Created by: Andrew Davies
- Portrayed by: Charlotte Coleman

In-universe information
- Species: Human
- Gender: Female
- Nationality: British

Marmalade Atkins is a children's fictional character created by the writer Andrew Davies. Marmalade first appeared in the book Marmalade and Rufus in 1979, and the character was later brought to television in 1981 in which she was played by Charlotte Coleman.

== History ==
A hair-raising teenage rebel, Marmalade made her TV debut in the one-off Marmalade Atkins in Space broadcast in 1981 as part of the Theatre Box series. This was followed by two ten-part series entitled Educating Marmalade in 1982–83, and Danger: Marmalade at Work in 1984, both of which continued to feature Coleman in the lead role.

Also featuring John Bird and Lynda Marchal as her parents Mr. and Mrs. Atkins (the latter replaced by Carol MacReady for the Marmalade at Work series), the programmes were produced by Thames Television for ITV. The show's creator, Andrew Davies, went on to author a series of Marmalade Atkins books. The theme track for Educating Marmalade was written and performed by Bad Manners.
