= Philip Bird =

English actor

Philip Bird is an English actor who has appeared in several British shows such as Peter Birch in the ITV soap opera Emmerdale in 2006. He has also appeared in BBC's Doctors, ITV's Heartbeat and Coronation Street. He appeared in the ITV sitcoms Tripper's Day and Slinger's Day. In 2014, Bird played the role of Allen Klein in the musical Sunny Afternoon.

== Filmography ==
=== Film ===
| Year | Title | Role | Notes |
|---|---|---|---|
| 1997 | Caught in the Act | Ted | |
| 1999 | Virtual Sexuality | David Parker | |
| 2005 | Imagine Me & You | Auctioneer | |
| 2008 | Blessed | Freddie | |
| 2010 | Shakespeare's Globe: As You Like It | Duke Senior | |
| 2011 | The Merry Wives of Windsor | Dr. Caius | |

=== Television ===
| Year | Title | Role | Notes |
|---|---|---|---|
| 1978 | Doctor Who | Swampie Warrior | Episode: "The Power of Kroll" |
| 1981 | Sapphire & Steel | Shape | 4 episodes |
| 1981 | Wet Job | Phil Jebb | Television film |
| 1982 | Whoops Apocalypse | Lt. Nipkin | Episode: "Set the Controls for the Heart of the Sun" |
| 1982 | The Agatha Christie Hour | Marchaud | Episode: "The Mystery of the Blue Jar" |
| 1983 | Reilly, Ace of Spies | Muller | Episode: "The Visiting Fireman" |
| 1984 | Tripper's Day | Hardie | 6 episodes |
| 1984–1986 | Fresh Fields | Peter Richardson | 5 episodes |
| 1986 | Chance in a Million | Bill | Episode: "For Whom the Bell Tolls" |
| 1986–1987 | Slinger's Day | Hardie | 12 episodes |
| 1987 | A Small Problem | Newsreader | Episode: "Keep on Running. Keep on Hiding" |
| 1987–1988 | Screen Two | Dr. Peploe / James Morland | 2 episodes |
| 1988 | Home James! | Nigel Honeywell | Episode: "Double Yolker" |
| 1989 | Campion | Rev. Philip Bathwick | 2 episodes |
| 1989 | Sob Sisters | Charlie | 7 episodes |
| 1989 | A Bit of a Do | Andrew Denton | 2 episodes |
| 1989–1991 | French Fields | Peter Richardson | 8 episodes |
| 1990 | Brass | Henri Lecoq | 5 episodes |
| 1990 | Drop the Dead Donkey | Reporter 2 | Episode: "Sex, Lies and Audiotape" |
| 1990 | This is David Harper | Bank Manager | Episode: "Making History" |
| 1991 | About Face | Simon | Episode: "Briefcase Encounter" |
| 1992 | Mr. Wakefield's Crusade | TV Newsreader | Episode #1.2 |
| 1994 | Murder Most Horrid | Man in Supermarket | Episode: "Mangez Merveillac" |
| 1995 | Ghosts | James Culverhouse | Episode: "Massage" |
| 1996 | The Ruth Rendell Mysteries | Neil | Episode: "Simisola: Part One" |
| 1996, 2006 | Heartbeat | Norman Harrison / Insp. Barry | 2 episodes |
| 1997 | Harry Enfield & Chums | Various roles | 5 episodes |
| 1997, 1999 | The Wild House | Dad | 2 episodes |
| 1997–2013 | Casualty | Various roles | 4 episodes |
| 1999 | Mike and Angelo | Tony Bamber | 2 episodes |
| 1999 | My Wonderful Life | Charles | Episode: "Gardening Leave" |
| 2000 | Coronation Street | Gregory Stephens | 2 episodes |
| 2000, 2004 | Holby City | Colin Walsh / Michael Sharp | 2 episodes |
| 2000–2019 | Doctors | Various roles | 6 episodes |
| 2001 | The Glass | Pete Cull | 5 episodes |
| 2002 | Murder in Mind | Frank | Episode: "Rage" |
| 2002 | The Queen's Nose | Mr. Fisher | Episode #6.5 |
| 2002 | Wild West | Incomer | Episode: "One Home Good, Two Homes Bad" |
| 2004 | Feather Boy | Headmaster | Episode #1.1 |
| 2004 | Murder City | DI Colin Webster | Episode: "Nothing Sacred" |
| 2004 | Silent Witness | DCI Jim Tennant | 2 episodes |
| 2005 | The Bill | Stuart Wilkinson | Episode: "286: In the Driving Seat" |
| 2005, 2007 | Midsomer Murders | Duncan Walton / Jeff Martin | 2 episodes |
| 2006 | The Worst Week of My Life | Alan | Episode: "The Worst Christmas of My Life: Part 1" |
| 2006, 2008 | Emmerdale | Peter Birch | 7 episodes |
| 2007 | The Royal | Brian Pinner | Episode: "Hoping for the Best" |
| 2007 | Rough Diamond | Interpreter | Episode: "A Royal Affair" |
| 2008 | My Family | Ziggy | Episode: "Can't Get No Satisfaction" |
| 2011 | The Fades | Mr. Peterson | 2 episodes |
| 2013 | EastEnders | Judge | Episode dated 12 November 2013 |
| 2017 | Emerald City | Herbalist | Episode: "Mistress - New - Mistress" |
| 2019 | Cheat | Doctor | 4 episodes |
| 2019 | Year of the Rabbit | Mr. Fisher | Episode: "Brick Man" |
| 2020 | Kate & Koji | Clive | Episode: "The Clam" |
| 2021 | Finding Alice | Funeral Director | 2 episodes |
