= Francis Coleman =

Canadian television producer (1924–2008)

- Born: Francis Arthur Coleman; 12 January 1924; Montreal, Quebec, Canada
- Died: 10 April 2008 (aged 84); Haringey, Greater London, England
- Education: McGill University; Conservatoire de musique et d'art dramatique du Québec; Eastman School of Music
- Occupations: Television producer, director, author, orchestral conductor
- Years active: 1952–1999
- Spouse: Ann Beach (m. 1966)
- Children: Charlotte • Lisa
- Awards: Prix Italia; Japan Prize for Education
- Honours: Chevalier of the Ordre des Arts et des Lettres (France)

Francis Arthur Coleman (12 January 1924 – 10 April 2008) was a Canadian television producer, director, author, and orchestral conductor who pioneered arts and music programming in the United Kingdom.

== Early life and education ==
Francis Arthur Coleman was born on 12 January 1924 in French-speaking Montreal, Quebec, Canada, to an Irish father and a French mother. He was educated at McGill University before continuing his musical studies at the Conservatoire de musique et d'art dramatique du Québec and the Eastman School of Music in Rochester, New York. He further developed his conducting technique under the tutelage of Pierre Monteux, attending two of the maestro's summer schools in Maine.

== Career ==
=== Musical career ===
Following his education, Coleman established himself as an orchestral conductor, finding regular engagement with the Royal Canadian Air Force Band (RCAF Band), various choirs, and travelling opera companies. He was subsequently appointed as the first musical director of the Royal Winnipeg Ballet (RWB). In the early 1950s, he also conducted concerts and variety shows for the radio services of the Canadian Broadcasting Corporation (CBC).

=== Move to television and CBC (1952–1958) ===
In 1952, Coleman transitioned from radio to television at the inception of Canadian television broadcasting. Joining the bilingual CBC/Radio-Canada network, he initially worked within the news department. During his six-year tenure with the corporation, he was responsible for producing or directing approximately 500 programmes. His output ranged from popular music and entertainment, such as the acclaimed French-language series Au P'tit Café, to high-profile event broadcasts, including a 1953 Coronation television special.

=== Independent television in Britain: Granada and ATV (1958–1964) ===
In 1958, Coleman chose to leave his established Canadian career to move to the United Kingdom, having accepted an invitation from Sidney Bernstein, the head of Granada Television. Initially assigned to more everyday commercial television traffic, he directed the musical quiz show Spot the Tune (1958–1960), various magazine programmes, the crime drama series Shadow Squad, and the live variety show Chelsea at Nine, which was broadcast from The Chelsea Palace Theatre on the King's Road.

The London-based work precipitated a move to Associated Television (ATV), the weekend franchise contractor for the midlands and weekday contractor for London. For ATV, Coleman directed episodes of On the Braden Beat (1962–1968), a satirical consumer affairs and comedy programme hosted by British actor Bernard Braden. He also originated and directed Dinner Party (1962–1963), an early experiment in fly-on-the-wall television hosted by the politician Lord Boothby. The programme utilised hidden cameras and microphones to record guests eating a meal under the pretence that they did not know if or when they were broadcasting live. To prevent the clatter of cutlery and the serving of vegetables from distracting viewers, he tightened the format by only switching the broadcast feed active when the guests reached the port and cigars stage of the evening.

Utilising his fluency in French, Coleman wrote and directed Içi la France for ATV's schools broadcasting service. The project comprised 26 documentary short films shot in France, focusing on classical French writers—including François Mauriac and Louis Aragon—as well as institutions like the Comédie-Française and the Sorbonne. For this series, the French Ministry of Culture appointed him a Chevalier of the Ordre des Arts et des Lettres. Furthermore, he was responsible for directing Sir John Betjeman's inaugural venture into commercial television, the documentary Steam and Stained Glass (1962).

=== BBC Two and arts programming (1964–1968) ===
Following the launch of BBC Two in 1964, which maintained an explicit editorial emphasis on high culture and the arts, Coleman left commercial television to join the corporation as senior producer for music and arts.

At the BBC, he enjoyed a prolific period of creative freedom, utilising his musical expertise to direct major arts specials and series. His productions included Shakespeare and Music, Solti on Conducting, and Peter Ustinov on Peter Ustinov. He produced and directed profiles of composers George Gershwin, Jacques Offenbach, Claudio Monteverdi, Antonio Vivaldi, and Giuseppe Verdi, alongside arts features documenting 18th-century London. His BBC programmes featured regular collaborations with high-profile cultural figures, including Luchino Visconti, Yehudi Menuhin, Dudley Moore, and Spike Milligan. Notably, Coleman directed a landmark live "television verité" broadcast of a recording session of Il trovatore at the Rome Opera House, and a televised performance of Monteverdi's Vespro della Beata Vergine live from Venice.

=== Executive roles: LWT and Thames (1968–1980s) ===
Following the 1968 ITV franchise reshuffle, Coleman returned to commercial television, taking up executive positions rather than full-time directing. He was appointed Head of Religious, Children's, and Educational Programmes for the newly formed London Weekend Television (LWT). His educational output during this period was awarded the international Japan Prize for Education.

Coleman subsequently moved to Thames Television, where he served first as Head of Schools Programmes and later as Head of Arts. Whilst at Thames, he achieved critical international success with his television production of Benjamin Britten's cantata St Nicolas, which won the Prix Italia music prize.

=== Later life and community work ===
After retiring from full-time television production, Coleman entered academia. He spent ten years working as a course director at the London International Film School and additionally lectured in media and communications at City University.

He remained an active figure in his local North London community, residing in Muswell Hill and Highgate. When the historic Phoenix Cinema in East Finchley was threatened with closure, Coleman spearheaded a community campaign to rescue the building, and subsequently stepped in to personally run and manage the cinema for a period.

A lifelong practising Buddhist, Coleman frequently wrote and presented scripts representing the faith on BBC Radio 4's daily religious slot, Thought for the Day. He was also a lighthearted writer, publishing commercial non-fiction titles including The Bluffer's Guide to Ballet (1969) and The Bluffer's Guide to Opera (1971).

== Personal life ==
On 30 July 1966, Coleman married the British actress Ann Beach at the Hampstead Register Office. The couple had two daughters, Charlotte Coleman and Lisa Coleman, both of whom entered the acting profession. Charlotte, who achieved mainstream recognition for her role in Four Weddings and a Funeral, died from an asthma attack in November 2001.

Coleman died on 10 April 2008 in Haringey, Greater London, England. He was 84. His widow died in 2017.
