= Ann Beach =

British actress (1938–2017)

- An undated publicity photo of Beach
- Born: Ann Beach; 7 June 1938; Wolverhampton, West Midlands, England
- Died: 9 March 2017 (aged 78); Haringey, Greater London, England
- Other name: Ann Coleman
- Education: Royal Academy of Dramatic Art
- Occupation: Actress
- Years active: 1957–2013
- Television: Fresh Fields (1984–1986)
- Spouse: Francis Coleman (m. 1966; died 2008)
- Children: Charlotte Coleman; Lisa Coleman
- Relatives: Albert Beach (paternal grandfather)

Ann Coleman (née Beach; 7 June 1938 – 9 March 2017) was a British actress whose career across stage, screen, and radio spanned more than five decades. She was best known for her role as Sonia Barrett in the ITV sitcom Fresh Fields (1984–1986).

== Early life and education ==
Ann Beach was born on 7 June 1938 in Wolverhampton, West Midlands, the elder daughter of Claude Ripley Beach, a grocer, and his wife, Rebecca (née Startup). She had a younger sister. Her paternal grandfather, Albert Beach, served as the mayor of Wolverhampton. The family later relocated to Cardiff, Wales, where they opened an ice-cream parlour.

Showing early musical talent as a vocalist, Beach joined the renowned Snowflakes children's choir, which won the inaugural competition at the Llangollen International Musical Eisteddfod in 1947. While attending Cardiff High School for Girls, her teachers noted her immense promise as a singer. She received significant personal encouragement from Rae Jenkins, the principal conductor of the BBC Welsh Orchestra, who believed she possessed the talent to pursue a professional career as an opera singer.

== Career ==
=== Training and early theatre (1954–1959) ===
Choosing drama over opera, Beach won a scholarship to the Royal Academy of Dramatic Art (RADA) and moved to London alone aged 16, taking up lodgings in Shepherds Hill, Highgate. She graduated in 1957, winning the prestigious Anmer Hall Memorial Prize.

Beach made her professional stage debut in 1957 at the Streatham Hill Theatre, appearing as Paquerette in a touring production of Georges Feydeau's farce L'Hôtel du libre échange alongside Frankie Howerd. The following year, she made her West End debut at the Apollo Theatre playing the title role in Emlyn Williams's Beth, portraying a 16-year-old with a mental age of eight. Her performance earned critical praise from The Stage, which labelled her "an outstandingly good actress with a promise for the future."

=== Theatrical breakthrough and Left-Bank collaborations (1959–1969) ===
In 1959, Beach joined Joan Littlewood's nascent Theatre Workshop company at the Theatre Royal Stratford East. She quickly became a stalwart of the company, mixing creative chaos with sharp comedic timing. Her early roles with Littlewood included Young Cratchit in A Christmas Carol, Rosey in the premiere of Lionel Bart's musical Fings Ain't Wot They Used T'Be, and Miss Gilchrist in Brendan Behan's play The Hostage, the latter of which successfully transferred to the West End's Wyndham's Theatre. In 1960, she starred at the Cambridge Theatre as the orange-eating Barbara opposite Albert Finney in Billy Liar.

Beach balanced her time at Stratford East with work at the Royal Court Theatre, relishing the high-minded rigour of the latter. Her Royal Court appearances included Max Frisch's play The Fire Raisers with Colin Blakely and James Booth, and John Osborne's double-bill of plays, Plays for England (1961), directed by Lindsay Anderson. In 1962, she performed in Osborne's Under Plain Cover, directed by Jonathan Miller.

She returned to Stratford East in 1963 to join the ensemble of the seminal satirical musical Oh! What a Lovely War. That same year, she made her debut with the Royal Shakespeare Company, appearing as Hermione in Peter Hall's production of A Midsummer Night's Dream. In 1964, she returned to the Royal Court to play Shirley, the pregnant secretary and mistress to Nicol Williamson's loathsome lawyer Bill Maitland, in Osborne's Inadmissible Evidence, directed by Anthony Page. The production subsequently transferred to the Wyndham's Theatre. In 1966, she shared the stage with Alastair Sim and Margaret Rutherford at the Chichester Festival Theatre in a revival of The Clandestine Marriage.

=== Musical theatre and West End "glamour" shows ===
Though sometimes considered underused in musical theatre, her powerful singing voice secured her several notable West End musical roles. She played Hortense in a 1967 revival of Sandy Wilson's musical The Boy Friend at the Comedy Theatre, directed by Wilson himself. In 1969, she starred opposite Hollywood icon Ginger Rogers at the Theatre Royal, Drury Lane in the musical Mame. Playing the role of Agnes Gooch, another pregnant secretary, Beach stopped the show nightly with her rendition of "Gooch's Song," showcasing her operatic high notes.

In 1975, she returned to Stratford East for the musical Nickleby and Me. In 1980, she played the eccentric Broadway zany Letitia Primrose alongside Keith Michell and Julia McKenzie in On the Twentieth Century at Her Majesty's Theatre. Later stage roles included Peter Gibbs's Selling the Sizzle (Hampstead Theatre, 1986) and the pantomime Cinderella (Cliffs Pavilion in Southend, 1987).

=== Television, film, and radio ===
Beach compiled an expansive television portfolio. Her screen breakthrough came in 1961 as Brenda, part of the feisty all-female garment factory workforce in the BBC sitcom The Rag Trade, starring alongside Barbara Windsor, Toni Palmer, Sheila Hancock, and Miriam Karlin.

Her most enduring television fame arrived in 1984 when she was cast as the nosy, eccentric neighbour Sonia Barrett in the ITV sitcom Fresh Fields, written by John Chapman and starring Julia McKenzie and Anton Rodgers. Characterised by her comedic catchphrase "It's only Sonia!", Beach played the role across the show's run until 1986, and later reprised the character as a guest star in the 1991 final episode of the expat-themed sequel, French Fields.

Her other television credits included playing Mrs Sowerberry in the 1982 adaptation of Oliver Twist (starring George C. Scott), as well as guest appearances in Foyle's War, Midsomer Murders, and the medical drama Monroe.

Though she appeared in fewer feature films, Beach reprised her role as the pert maid in the 1966 cinematic adaptation of Hotel Paradiso, starring Alec Guinness and Gina Lollobrigida. She also appeared in the star-studded 1972 film adaptation of Dylan Thomas's radio drama Under Milk Wood. In 1999, she made a brief but memorable appearance as William Thacker's (Hugh Grant) mother in the romantic comedy Notting Hill.

Beach was a prolific radio actress, praising the medium for a team spirit that reminded her of her early repertory theatre days. She performed in countless BBC radio dramas over decades, including William Trevor's Solitude (2002). In 2012, she enjoyed a brief tenure on the BBC Radio 4 soap opera The Archers, playing Joyce Walters, a tenant of Lilian Bellamy.

=== Later years ===
As theatre opportunities grew scarcer in her later career, Beach successfully transitioned into voice coaching and worked as a drama teacher at the Mountview Academy of Theatre Arts. In private life, friends and colleagues frequently recalled her party trick: playing Frédéric Chopin's piece Minute Waltz on the piano while singing frantic, breathless self-penned lyrics.

== Personal life ==
On 30 July 1966, Beach married the Canadian television producer Francis Coleman at the Hampstead Register Office. The couple had two daughters, Charlotte Coleman and Lisa Coleman, both of whom entered the acting profession. Charlotte, who achieved mainstream recognition for her role in Four Weddings and a Funeral, died from an asthma attack in November 2001. Her husband died in 2008.

Beach died on 9 March 2017 in Haringey, Greater London. She was 78.

== Filmography ==
Year	Title	Role	Notes	Ref.
1957	Play of the Week	Maud Riordan	Episode: "The Grass Harp"	
1958, 1960, 1971, 1973	Armchair Theatre	Elaine Morris, Penelope, Mrs. Drayton	4 episodes	
1960	The City of the Dead	Lottie		
1960	Theatre Night	Barbara	Episode: "Billy Liar"	
1961	On the Fiddle	Iris		
1961	Nothing Barred	Girlfriend Who Drops Through Open Manhole	Uncredited	
1961	The Rag Trade	Brenda	9 episodes	
1961–1962	BBC Sunday-Night Play	Miss Chatham, Thelma	2 episodes	
1962	The Fast Lady	Miss Timpkins		
1963	Tempo	Herself	Episode: "Lions Led by Donkeys"	
1963–1964	Festival	Saunders, Maria	2 episodes	
1965	Off Beat...	Actress	2 episodes	
1966	The World of Wooster	Parlourmaid	Episode: "Jeeves and the Clustering Round Young Bingo"	
1966	Hotel Paradiso	Victoire		
1966, 1971, 1977	Play of the Month	Gwen, Anna Vyroubova, Violet, Mrs. Dainty Fidget	4 episodes	
1967	Half Hour Story	Jennifer	Episode: "The 45th Unmarried Mother"	
1968	Sebastian	Pamela		
1969	Jackanory	Storyteller	5 episodes	
1969–1970	The Wednesday Play	Blodwen Wilderness, Music Hall Artiste	2 episodes	
1970	Steptoe and Son	Daphne	Episode: "Steptoe and Son - and Son!"	
1970	The Rise and Rise of Michael Rimmer	Receptionist (Yvonne)		
1971	For the Love of Ada	Alice Bingley	Episode: "The Journey"	
1971	Elephant's Eggs in a Rhubarb Tree	Various roles	6 episodes	
1971	Under Milk Wood	Polly Garter		
1971	The Rivals of Sherlock Holmes	Mary Grandard	Episode: "The Woman in the Big Hat"	
1971	Shirley's World	Actress	Episode: "The Rally"	
1972	The Man Outside	Maudlin	Episode: "A Persistent Coffin"	
1972, 1980	Play for Today	Valerie, Shirley Ritchie, Morag	3 episodes	
1973	Never Mind the Quality Feel the Width	Bridie		
1973	Song at Twilight	Shirley Ritchie		
1973	Seven of One	Doris	Episode: "My Old Man"	
1974	Perils of Pendragon	Maudlin	2 episodes	
1974	Omnibus	Queen Victoria	Episode: "Crystal Palace-The Great Glass Hive"	
1974	Masquerade	Freda	Episode: "Service Not Included"	
1974	Late Night Drama	Diane	Episode: "You Don't Remember!"	
1975	Ten from the Twenties	Jehane	Episode: "The Orsini Emeralds"	
1975	Dawson's Weekly	Mrs. Ffoulkes	Episode: "The Clerical Error"	
1975	Shades of Greene	Miss Sanderson	Episode: "Special Duties"	
1976	Bouquet of Barbed Wire	Monica	2 episodes	
1976	Widowing of Mrs. Holroyd	Clara		
1976	The Government Inspector	Mayor's wife	Episode: "Bribery and Corruption"	
1976	James and the Giant Peach	Aunt Sponge		
1977	Rising Damp	Mrs. Brent	Episode: "	
1977	Fred Basset	Actress	Short film	
1977	The Battle of Billy's Pond	Mrs. Bateson	Television film	
1978	The Upchat Connection	Una	Episode: "Spring in Park Lane"	
1978	BBC2 Play of the Week	Morag	Episode: "The Vanishing Army"	
1979	Brecht and Co	Member of Brecht's company, Widow Begbick, Polly Peacham		
1979	Diary of a Nobody	Sarah	9 episodes	
1980	The History of Mr. Polly	Mrs. Johnson	2 episodes	
1980	Tales of the Unexpected	Miss Unwin	Episode: "Georgy Porgy"	
1981	Holding the Fort	Muriel	Episode: "Famous First Words"	
1981	Only When I Laugh	Helen Roper-Jones	Episode: "Postman's Knock"	
1982	Oliver Twist	Mrs. Sowerberry	Television film	
1983	Salad Days	Timothy's Mother		
1983	Nanny	Miss Alice Casson	Episode: "The Prodigy"	
1984–1986	Fresh Fields	Sonia Barrett	26 episodes	
1985	Tandoori Nights	Nurse Peters	Episode: "Far from the Ganges"	
1986	That Uncertain Feeling	Mrs. Davies	4 episodes	
1987	The Sooty Show	Detective Sergeant Sarah Snoop	Episode: "White Lies"	
1987	Scene	Mother	Episode: "This Year's Model"	
1989–1990	Brookside	Jane Harper	6 episodes	
1990	Home to Roost	Rita Higgs	Episode: "Return to Clagthorpe"	
1991	King Ralph	Miranda's Mother		
1991	French Fields	Sonia Barrett	Episode: "Hail and Farewell"	
1991, 1994	Screen One	Mrs. Chubb, Mrs. Leveller	2 episodes	
1992	Land of Hope and Gloria	Freda	Episode: "Running Before Walking"	
1993	Bookmark	Headmaster's wife	Episode: "Selected Exits"	
1994	The Lifeboat	Phyllis Shore	4 episodes	
1995	The Bill	Mrs. Parker	Episode: "All in the Game"	
1995	Stick with Me, Kid	Lorinda	Episode: "Man of a Couple Faces"	
1998	Wycliffe	Mrs. Wimble	Episode: "Land's End"	
1999	Notting Hill	William's Mother		
1999	People Like Us	Actress	Episode: "The Photographer"	
2000	Home Farm Twins	Dotty Miller	Episode: "Sam and AJ Save the Day"	
2001	Peak Practice	Eunice Gould	Episode: "Flesh and Blood"	
2001–2002	Treasure	Actress	13 episodes	
2002	Double Act	Gran	Television film	
2005	Midsomer Murders	Sonia Hardwick	Episode: "Sauce for the Goose"	
2005	Cold Blood	Lynn	Episode: "Cold Blood"	
2006	Doctor Who: The Monthly Adventures	The Deacon	Episode: "Night Thoughts"	
2007	Foyle's War	Hilda Greenwood	Episode: "Bleak Midwinter"	
2007	I Am Bob	Friendly Old Lady		
2007	The History of Mr Polly	Mrs. Rumbold		
2008	HolbyBlue	Annie	Episode: "Episode #2.3"	
2010	Bad Night for the Blues	Madge	Short film	
2011	The Afternoon Play	Alice	Episode: "Small Acts of Kindness"	
2011	Pandora's Tower	Mavda		
2011	Fast Freddie, The Widow and Me	Freddie's Grandma		
2011	Lovers & Other Problems	Actress		
2012	Monroe	June Daggert	Episode: "Episode #2.5"	
2012	The Archers	Joyce Walters	6 episodes	
2013	One Chance	Elderly Woman		
