= Liz Crowther =

British actress

- Born: Elizabeth Ann Crowther; 9 December 1954 (age 71); Isleworth, Middlesex, England
- Occupation: Actress
- Years active: 1966–present
- Parent(s): Leslie Crowther; Jean Crowther (née Stone)

Elizabeth Ann Crowther (born 9 December 1954) is an English theatre actress. Her father was the actor, comedian and presenter Leslie Crowther and her mother was Jean Crowther, actress and dancer.

== Theatre work ==
Beginning her stage career in 1966, Crowther debuted with London Festival Ballet (now English National Ballet), playing Clara, the lead role in the annual production of The Nutcracker. At the time, she was training at Arts Educational Schools, London, where she studied from ages 10–17. She later went on to train at École Jacques Lecoq, Paris, where she focused primarily on mime and physical theatre.

Since then, Crowther has featured in over a hundred theatre productions, touring in England as well as performing internationally.

Among Crowther's later theatre work are productions of A Passage to India (Simple8 Theatre/Theatre Royal, Northampton/ Park Theatre), Running Wild (Chichester/Regents Park Theatre, UK tour), Oliver Twist (Regents Park) and Kite (Wrong Crowd/Soho Theatre) as part of the London International Mime Festival.

Working with the Royal Shakespeare Company (RSC) in Stratford, Crowther was cast in productions of Middleton and Dekker's The Roaring Girl, John Webster's The White Devil, Massinger's The City Madam and Weiss' Marat/Sade, a 'reimagined' version of Cardenio (Shakespeare's lost play) by Gregory Doran, Song of Songs (adapted from the biblical text) and The Witch of Edmonton by Dekker and Ford.

Crowther played the title role in Richard III, performing the show and conducting workshops on tour across the US, with 'Actors from the London Stage'. She has also performed in Romeo and Juliet (Rose Theatre, Bankside, and Globe Theatre), Macbeth (Theatre Royal, Northampton), Twelfth Night and The Merry Wives of Windsor (Regents Park).

Appearing in over twenty-five plays for the same theatre, Crowther's credits at the Orange Tree Theatre, Richmond, include Middlemarch Trilogy, The Memorandum, Bodies, What the Heart Feels, Four Attempted Acts and King Lear.

Elsewhere, Crowther has appeared in Cyrano de Bergerac (Royal Exchange), Blithe Spirit (Nottingham Playhouse), Mr Whatnot, The Elephant Man, Piaf, Wait Until Dark and David Copperfield (Theatre Royal, Northampton), Abigail's Party (Hampstead Theatre & UK Tour), Communicating Doors (Stephen Joseph and Chicago Theatre Festival), The Real Thing (UK Tour), and Be My Baby and Pat and Margaret (Salisbury Playhouse).

Crowther's noteworthy appearances in London's West End include The Country Wife (Theatre Royal Haymarket), Gambling (Royal Court), Onassis (Novello Theatre), Animal Farm (National Theatre) and Ducktastic (Noël Coward Theatre), written by comedy double-act The Right Size and directed by Kenneth Branagh.

In 2023 Crowther played Es in Es and Flo by Jennifer Lunn, a drama about dementia that played at the Wales Millennium Centre and the Kiln Theatre, London, directed by Susie McKenna.

== Television and film work ==
Although primarily a stage performer, Crowther has also made film and television appearances. She first appeared as Lucy in ABC's 1967 production of The Lion, The Witch and the Wardrobe. Later, she featured in Shoestring, Watching, Slinger's Day, French Fields, The Dumping Ground, Outnumbered, Mansfield Park, Holby City, London's Burning, Miss Marple, EastEnders and A Very Peculiar Practice. Beyond these appearances, Crowther was a regular cast member in soap opera Family Affairs, playing Annie Hart, from its debut in 1997, until 1999. She also played Sgt Jane Kendall in The Bill for nine months in 1993. Recent television includes: Beyond Paradise, three episodes of Pack of Lies, The Chelsea Detective, Miss Scarlet and The Duke, the Christmas episode of Vera, and Dalgleish.

In film, Crowther has played Romola Garai's mother in The Unicorn (Daybreak Pictures), a short film by Penelope Skinner. She has also featured in Funseekers (Comic Strip) and The Thirty-Nine Steps (Rank). Crowther appears as Beth in the French romcom Jane Austen a Gâché ma Vie which premiered at the Toronto Film Festival in September 2024, followed by the Marrakesh Film Festival in November 2024.

== Selected filmography ==
Year	Title	Role	Notes
1967	The Lion, the Witch and the Wardrobe	Lucy	10 episodes
1968	The Queen Street Gang	Philippa	9 episodes
1968	ITV Playhouse	Esther	Thirteen Thousand and Eighty Free Pounds
1978	The Thirty Nine Steps	Maid (uncredited)	
1979	Hazell	Cynthia	Episode: "Hazell Gets the Boot"
1979–1980	Shoestring	Sonia	20 episodes
1983	Mansfield Park	Julia Bertram	5 episodes (TV mini-series)
1984	Play for Today	Doctor	"Dog Ends"
1984	Tripper's Day	Sylvia	6 episodes
1985	Miss Marple: A Murder is Announced	Myrna Harris	2 episodes
1986	A Very Peculiar Practice	Antonia	Episode: "A Very Long Way from Anywhere"
1986	No Place Like Home	Elsie	5 episodes
1986	Slinger's Day	Sylvia	6 episodes
1987	Bergerac	Carol Miles	Episode: "A Desirable Little Residence"
1988	The Comic Strip Presents	April	"Funseekers"
1988–1989	Watching	Susan Roberts	8 episodes
1989–1990	French Fields	Jill Trendle	12 episodes
1991	Titmuss Regained	Daphne Jones	1 episode (TV mini-series)
1992	The Bill	Susan Harding	Episode: "Just Send Them Flowers"
1992–1993	Growing Pains	Sandra Phillips	20 episodes
1993	A Year in Provence	Georgina	1 episode (TV mini-series)
1993	The Bill	Sgt. Jane Kendall	11 episodes
1995	Ghosts	Nurse Angela	Episode: "Shadowy Third"
1995	Porkpie	Janice	Episode: "Spend, Spend, Spend"
1997–1999	Family Affairs	Annie Hart	35 episodes
2000	Grange Hill	Carol Wright	2 episodes
2001	London's Burning	Alison Hemmings	8 episodes
2006	EastEnders	Marion	1 episode
2006	Holby City	Iona Morrow	Episode: "The Games People Play"
2008	Outnumbered	Alice	Episode: "The Airport"
2010	Lewis	Mrs. Lemming	Episode: "Dark Matter"
2016	The Dumping Ground	Mary	Episode: "The End of it All"
2020	Shakespeare & Hathaway: Private Investigators	Nelissa Norris	Episode: "All That Glisters"
2022	The Chelsea Detective	Nancy Cooper	Episode: "Mrs. Romano"
2022	Miss Scarlet and The Duke	Maud Skelton	Episode: "The Heir"
2023	Dalgleish: A Certain Justice	Margaret Jackson	1 episode
2023	The Following Events Are Based on a Pack of Lies	Joyce Ransom	4 episodes
2023	Vera	Judith Sinclair	Episode: "The Rising Tide"
2024	Beyond Paradise	Penny	1 episode
2024	Jane Austen Wrecked My Life	Beth	Feature film

== Charity work ==
Crowther works with Scene & Heard, a playwriting charity committed to benefiting disadvantaged children in Somers Town, Kings Cross, London, performing alongside other volunteer theatre professionals.
