= Travellers by Night =

1967 anthology of horror stories edited by August Derleth

- Dust-jacket illustration by James Dietrich, design by Gary Gore.
- Editor: August Derleth
- Cover artist: James Dietrich, design by Gary Gore
- Language: English
- Genre: Fantasy, horror
- Publisher: Arkham House
- Publication date: 1964
- Publication place: United States
- Media type: Print (hardback)
- Pages: 261

Travellers by Night is an anthology of horror stories edited by American writer August Derleth. It was released in 1967 by Arkham House in an edition of 2,486 copies. None of the stories had been previously published.

== Contents ==
Travellers by Night contains the following tales:

- "The Cicerones", by Robert Aickman
- "Episode on Cain Street", by Joseph Payne Brennan
- "The Cellars", by J. Ramsey Campbell
- "The Man Who Rode the Trains", by Paul A. Carter
- "A Handful of Silver", by Mary Elizabeth Counselman
- "Denkirch", by David Drake
- "The Wild Man of the Sea", by William Hope Hodgson
- "The Unpleasantness at Carver House", by Carl Jacobi
- "The Terror of Anerley House School", by Margery Lawrence
- "The Horror From the Middle Span", by H. P. Lovecraft and August Derleth
- "Not There", by John Metcalfe
- "Family Tree", by Frank D. Thayer, Jr.
- "Death of a Bumblebee", by H. Russell Wakefield
- "The Crater", by Donald Wandrei

== Sources ==
- Jaffery, Sheldon (1989). The Arkham House Companion. Mercer Island: Starmont House, Inc. pp. 84–85. ISBN 1-55742-005-X.
- Chalker, Jack L.; Mark Owings (1998). The Science-Fantasy Publishers: A Bibliographic History, 1923-1998. Westminster, MD and Baltimore: Mirage Press, Ltd. p. 44.
- Joshi, S.T. (1999). Sixty Years of Arkham House: A History and Bibliography. Sauk City, WI: Arkham House. pp. 97–98. ISBN 0-87054-176-5.
- Nielsen, Leon (2004). Arkham House Books: A Collector's Guide. Jefferson, NC and London: McFarland & Company, Inc. p. 99. ISBN 0-7864-1785-4.
