= Ian Davidson (scriptwriter) =

British scriptwriter (1940–2024)

Ian Roger Charles Davidson (4 August 1940 – 8 September 2024) was a British scriptwriter who also acted, directed and produced in television and the theatre from the 1960s.

== Life and career ==
Davidson was born in Romford, Essex on 4 August 1940, the son of John and Denise Davidson. After performing and writing with Michael Palin and Terry Jones at Oxford University – his first BBC writing credit was for That Was the Week That Was in 1963 – he became an actor at The Second City in Chicago.

Returning to the UK by 1966, he worked as a film director for Ned Sherrin and David Frost, and then began a lifelong association with Barry Humphries as a writer and director. In 1967, Davidson married Anthea Proud, and they had four daughters.

Davidson appeared, briefly, in many of the Monty Python's Flying Circus episodes, notably as a Dead Indian On a Pile of Dung, and as a news reporter who interrupts a sketch to say that it is his first time appearing on television.

He was script editor of The Two Ronnies from 1978 to 1983 and with Peter Vincent wrote seven series of the sitcom Sorry! With Vincent he also wrote for Dave Allen, The Brittas Empire, and Comrade Dad. With John Chapman, he wrote French Fields for Thames Television. In 2013, Vincent and Davidson wrote When the Dog Dies for Radio 4.

Davidson died from cancer on 8 September 2024, aged 84.
