= Burning Sands =

Burning Sands may refer to:

- Burning Sands (novel), a 1921 novel by Arthur Weigall
- Burning Sands (1922 film), an American silent drama film
- Burning Sands (1960 film), a German-Israeli adventure film
- Burning Sands (2017 film), an American drama film
