= Arthur Weigall =

English writer (1880–1934)

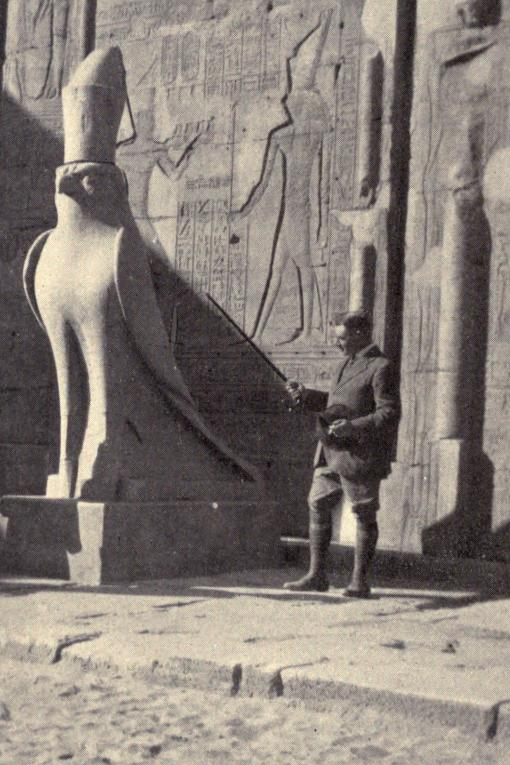
Weigall at the Temple of Edfu, before 1913

Arthur Edward Pearse Brome Weigall (20 November 1880 – 2 January 1934) was an English Egyptologist, stage designer, journalist and author. His work ranges from histories of Ancient Egypt and historical biographies to guidebooks, popular novels and screenplays.

== Biography ==
Arthur Weigall was born in the year in which his father, Major Arthur Archibald Denne Weigall, died on the North West Frontier of British India. The Weigall family were prominent in Victorian society as artists, marrying into the aristocracy; his cousins were Conservative politician Sir Archibald Weigall, 1st Baronet, Governor of South Australia from 1920 to 1922, and the cricketers Gerry, Louis and Evelyn Weigall. As a young widow, his mother, the former Alice Henrietta Cowen, worked as a missionary in the inner-city slums of late-Victorian England. Arthur Weigall went from an unconventional home life in Salford to Wellington College, a school with strong establishment and military connections. He started work as an apprentice clerk in the City of London, but a youthful fascination with genealogy led him to the pharaohs of Ancient Egypt and so into Egyptology. A mysterious patroness encouraged him to apply for New College, Oxford. This was a mistake (Egyptology was not yet studied at Oxford) so before completing his admission tests he went on to Leipzig, hoping to learn German and then enrol in a German university. This didn't happen, and on his return to England Weigall found work with Egyptologist Flinders Petrie, first at University College London and then at Abydos in Egypt.

Life with Petrie was notoriously harsh, and after a while Weigall went to work for Friedrich Wilhelm von Bissing, a German Egyptologist. In early 1905 Howard Carter was staying with Weigall at Saqqara when, after an incident with some French tourists, Carter was forced to resign his post as Chief Inspector of Antiquities for Upper Egypt. Suddenly, at the age of 25, Weigall was appointed to replace Carter at Luxor, responsible for protecting and managing the antiquities of a region that extended from Nag Hammadi to the border with Sudan.

At Luxor, Weigall threw himself with immense energy into aspects of the job that in his view had been somewhat neglected – the protection and conservation of monuments that were steadily being bought up and moved to Europe and North America. He remained in Luxor until 1911. This was a time of intense activity for Weigall, both in the field and in writing. He participated in the discoveries of KV46 (the tomb of Yuya and Tjuyu), TT8 (the tomb of Kha and Merit), KV55 (a mysterious tomb whose contents are still debated), and KV57 (the tomb of Horemheb). Weigall also travelled in the Eastern Desert, wrote a popular biography of Akhenaten, and worked on a Guide to the Antiquities of Upper Egypt. He worked with Alan Gardiner on the tombs of the nobles and may well have helped Howard Carter to the placement with Lord Carnarvon that led to the discovery of the tomb of Tutankhamun. He was deeply enmeshed in the bureaucratic and social entanglements of Luxor and Cairo, coming into close contact with Carter, Flinders Petrie, Gaston Maspero, Theodore Davis, Percy Newberry, and others, and making friends with Sir Ronald Storrs and the wider Edwardian society in Egypt. However, a breakdown took him from Egypt, and World War I cut off his plans to create an institute of Egyptology for Egyptians.

In London during World War I Weigall became a successful set-designer for the revue stage. An association with film began: he worked with Bannister Merwin, Jack Buchanan, and Phyllis Monkman on the film Her Heritage (1919), and in the 1920s Lord Northcliffe appointed him film critic for the Daily Mail. Later, one of his novels was made into the film Burning Sands (1922) by the producer George Melford.

Journalism brought him back to Egypt. He covered the opening of the tomb of Tutankhamun as correspondent for the Daily Mail, in direct opposition to Howard Carter and Lord Carnarvon's attempts with The Times to monopolise the story, which Weigall regarded as both wrong and politically damaging to British relations with Egypt at a time of strong nationalist feeling. Seeing Carnarvon joke as he prepared to enter the tomb, Weigall is reported as saying 'if he goes down in that spirit, I give him six weeks to live'.

Arthur Weigall died in 1934. During his first marriage to Hortense Schleiter, an American, he wrote vivid personal accounts of his life in Luxor and Upper Egypt. His second marriage (to the pianist Muriel Lillie, sister of the comedian Beatrice Lillie) returned him to the world of show business as a talented writer of lyrics.

== Filmography ==
Year	Title	Role
1919	Her Heritage	Screenwriter
1922	Burning Sands	Writer
2022	Tutankhamun's Tomb: Secrets of the Tomb	Himself (Archival Footage)

== Selected publications ==
- A Report on the Antiquities of Lower Nubia, Thornton Butterworth, London, 1907
- A Catalogue of the Weights and Balances in the Cairo Museum, 1908
- A Treasury of Ancient Egypt, Rand McNally & Company, Chicago and New York, 1913
- Travels in the Upper Egyptian Deserts, William Blackwood and Sons, London, 1913
- The Life and Times of Cleopatra, Queen of Egypt, G. P. Putnam's Sons, New York, 1914
- Arthur Weigall A History of Events in Egypt from 1798 to 1914, William Blackwood and Sons, London, 1915
- Madeline of the Desert, 1920
- The Life and Times of Marc Antony, Garden City Publishing Company. New York, 1921
- Bedouin Love, George H. Doran Company, New York, 1922
- The Life and Times of Akhnaton, Thornton Butterworth, London, 1922, reprinted 2000, ISBN 978-0-8154-1092-8
- The Glory of the Pharaohs, Thornton Butterworth, London, first published March 1923, reprinted 1923, First impression Keystone library, 1936
- Tutankhamen And Other Essays, Thornton Butterworth Ltd., London, first published November 1923
- A History of the Pharaohs, Thornton Butterworth Ltd., London, 1925: Volume 1 - The First Eleven Dynasties, Volume 2 - The 12th to 18th Dynasties
- Wanderings in Roman Britain, Thornton Butterworth, London, 1926
- Wanderings in Anglo-Saxon Britain, George H. Doran Company, New York, 1927
- The Grand Tour of Norman England. London: Hodder and Stoughton. 1927.
- Personalities of Antiquity, Doubleday, Doran, & company, 1928. ISBN 0-8369-1217-9
- Paganism in Our Christianity, orig. pub. 1928, Kessinger Publishing 2003 reprint, ISBN 0-7661-3541-1
- Sapho of Lesbos: Her Life and Times, Thornton Butterworth, London, 1932
- Alexander the Great, 1933. ISBN 9989-920-86-9
- Laura Was My Camel, Thornton Butterworth Ltd, London, 1933
- Nero: Emperor of Rome, Thornton Butterworth, London, 1933
- A Short History of Ancient Egypt, Chapman & Hall, London, 1934
- The Dweller in the Desert
- A Guide to the Antiquities of Egypt, ISBN 0-09-185047-9
