= This'll Make You Whistle (musical) =

1935 stage musical

- Sheet music from the show.
- Original language: English
- Written by: Guy Bolton; Fred Thompson
- Music by: Maurice Sigler; Al Goodhart; Al Hoffman
- Genre: Musical
- Setting: London, Le Touquet

Premiere
- Date: 16 December 1935
- Place: Kings Theatre, Southsea

This'll Make You Whistle is a British musical with a book by Guy Bolton and Fred Thompson and music and lyrics by Maurice Sigler, Al Goodhart and Al Hoffman. It premiered at the Kings Theatre, Southsea before beginning a 190 performance run in the West End lasting from 15 September 1936 until 27 February 1937, originally at the Palace Theatre before transferring to Daly's Theatre.

The show was created as a vehicle for the entertainer Jack Buchanan. The original London cast also included Jean Gillie, Elsie Randolph, William Kendall, David Hutcheson and Gordon Craig. Buchanan produced the show himself, in conjunction with C.B. Cochran. The sets were designed by the art director Clifford Pember.

== Adaption ==
A film version This'll Make You Whistle produced and directed by Herbert Wilcox was released in November 1936 featuring much of the same cast currently performing on stage, who shot the film at Elstree Studios before returning to the West End for the evening's performance.

== Bibliography ==
- Wearing, J. P. The London Stage 1930-1939: A Calendar of Productions, Performers, and Personnel. Rowman & Littlefield, 2014.
- Wright, Adrian. Cheer Up! British Musical Films, 1929-1945. Boydell Press, 2020.
