= Sleeping Car (film) =

1933 film by Anatole Litvak

- Directed by: Anatole Litvak
- Written by: Michael Gordon; Anatole Litvak; Roland Pertwee; Franz Schulz
- Produced by: Michael Balcon
- Starring: Madeleine Carroll; Ivor Novello; Laddie Cliff
- Cinematography: Günther Krampf; Glen MacWilliams
- Edited by: Henri Rust
- Music by: Bretton Byrd; Louis Levy
- Production company: Gaumont British Picture Corporation
- Distributed by: Gaumont Ideal Films
- Release date: June 1933
- Running time: 82 minutes
- Country: United Kingdom
- Language: English

Sleeping Car is a 1933 British romantic comedy film directed by Anatole Litvak and starring Madeleine Carroll, Ivor Novello, and Laddie Cliff.

It was made at the Lime Grove Studios in London. The film's art direction was by Alfred Junge.

== Plot ==
A young French sleeping car attendant working on the trans-European Orient Express has a string of lovers at the various stations along the line. However his world is transformed when he meets a young British aristocrat, who he asks out for a date in Vienna but has to abandon because of a lack of funds. Angry with him she returns to Paris, while he is fired for taking time off without permission. However, discovering that due to various driving offences her stay in France will be cut short unless she marries a French citizen, she decides to marry him.

== Cast ==
- Madeleine Carroll as Anne
- Ivor Novello as Gaston
- Kay Hammond as Simone
- Claud Allister as Baron Delande
- Laddie Cliff as Pierre
- Stanley Holloway as Francois
- Ivor Barnard as Durande
- Vera Bryer as Jenny

== Bibliography ==
- Low, Rachael. Filmmaking in 1930s Britain. George Allen & Unwin, 1985.
- Wood, Linda. British Films, 1927-1939. British Film Institute, 1986.
