= The Co-Optimists (film) =

1929 film by Edwin Greenwood and Laddie Cliff

- Directed by: Laddie Cliff; Edwin Greenwood
- Written by: Laddie Cliff; Melville Gideon
- Produced by: E. Gordon Craig
- Starring: Davy Burnaby; Stanley Holloway; Melville Gideon
- Cinematography: Sydney Blythe; Basil Emmott
- Music by: Pierre De Caillaux (director)
- Production company: Gordon Craig Productions
- Distributed by: New Era
- Release date: 27 December 1929
- Running time: 83 minutes
- Country: United Kingdom
- Languages: Sound (All-Talking); English

The Co-Optimists is an all-talking sound 1929 British musical film revue directed by Edwin Greenwood and Laddie Cliff and starring Davy Burnaby, Stanley Holloway and Betty Chester. It was made at Twickenham Studios. The film was broken up into parts and re-released as six short films in 1931.

== Production background ==
The film consists of excerpts from the stage musical of the same name which was devised by Davy Burnaby in 1921. The Co-Optimists consisted of a troupe of actors and singers and became largely successful by touring seaside resorts throughout England.

The show opened in London on 21 June 1921 and closed on 4 August 1927. The film was produced by Gordon Craig Productions and was directed by Laddie Cliff (who also starred in the film) and Edwin Greenwood. This film also provided Stanley Holloway with his second film appearance having been with the troupe from the start.

In December 1926, co-star Betty Chester appeared in a short film made in the DeForest Phonofilm sound-on-film process, singing the song 'Pig-Tail Alley' from the show.

== Cast ==
- Davy Burnaby
- Laddie Cliff
- Melville Gideon
- Gilbert Childs
- Stanley Holloway
- Phyllis Monkman
- Betty Chester
- Elsa MacFarlane
- Peggy Petronella
- Harry S. Pepper

== Critical response ==
Hal Erickson of All Movie Guide noted that the revue had recently finished its U.S. run at the time of this film's release. He criticized the film for its stagy presentation. He stated that the film was poorly received by the critics, although Burnaby as master of ceremonies was praised.

== See also ==
- List of early sound feature films (1926–1929)
