= Greatrex Newman =

English author, songwriter and screenwriter (1892–1984)

- Born: Herbert John Greatrex Newman; 3 July 1892; Manchester, U.K.
- Died: 27 January 1984 (aged 91); Eastbourne, U.K.
- Occupations: Lyricist, comedy writer

Herbert John Greatrex Newman (3 July 1892 – 27 January 1984) was an English writer, songwriter and screenwriter. He wrote entertainments for the London stage, at seaside resorts, and on radio, with particular success in the 1930s.

== Biography ==
Newman was born in Manchester, the son of John Charles Newman and Jessie Augusta Letitia Greatrex Newman. He began performing with the Fol-de-Rols revue in 1911, and began writing songs and skits by 1914. He served in the Royal Air Force during World War I.

He wrote and performed entertainments for the London stage, for summer tourists at British seaside resorts, and on radio for decades, beginning in the 1920s and continuing into the 1960s. The Optimists, a musical revue he co-wrote with Clifford Grey, Austin Melford and Melville Gideon, was produced in New York City in 1928. Mr. Cinders, another 1928 project with Clifford Grey and Vivian Ellis, was revived in London in 1983, in Connecticut in 1988, and in New York in 1993.

Newman and three others were fined for a sketch featuring a bedroom scene, in London in 1935. He organized concert parties to entertain the troops for the Entertainments National Service Association during World War II. He died at a hospital in Eastbourne in 1984, at the age of 91.

== Selected works ==
- The Girl from Cook's (1927, The Gaiety, with R. H. Burnside, Raymond Hubbell and Jean Gilbert)
- Lady Luck (1927, with Firth Shephard)
- Mr. Cinders (1928, with Clifford Grey and Vivian Ellis)
- The Optimists (1928, with Clifford Grey, Austin Melford, and Melville Gideon)
- A la Carte (1932, with Laddie Cliff)
- The Yo-yo Men of England (1932, with Laddie Cliff)
- Mr. Whittington (1934, with Clifford Grey and Douglas Furber)
- Love Laughs (1935, with Clifford Grey, Noel Gay, Mabel Wayne, and Desmond Carter)
- Stop Press (1935, contributed sketches to revue)
- All Wave! (1936, with Archie de Bear, Eric Maschwitz, and Jack Strachey)
