= The Co-Optimists =

Stage variety revue

The Co-Optimists was a stage variety revue that opened in London on 27 June 1921. The show was devised by Davy Burnaby. The piece was a co-operative venture by what The Times called "a group of well-known musical comedy and variety artists" presenting "an all-star 'pierrot' entertainment in the West-end." It opened at the small Royalty Theatre and soon transferred to the much larger Palace Theatre. The show ran initially for 500 performances; it was completely rewritten and revived at regular intervals to keep it fresh. The final edition, beginning in November 1926 and closing on 4 August 1927, was the 13th version.

The Co-Optimists provided an early platform for the comedy actor and singer Stanley Holloway, and brought him wider notice throughout the UK. In 1929 the revue was made into a feature film with the same title, again starring Holloway. In December 1926, Lee DeForest filmed Betty Chester singing "Pig-Tail Alley" in a short film, Betty Chester, the Well-Known Co-Optimist Star, made in his Phonofilm sound-on-film process.

== Music and lyrics ==
The show's music and lyrics were written by Melville Gideon, Clifford Grey, Irving Berlin, Philip Braham, Vivian Ellis, William Helmore, Ivy St Helier, Laddie Cliff, Austin Melford, Greatrex Newman, Arthur Schwartz and Clifford Seyler.

== Stage artists ==
The stage performers were George K. Arthur, Davy Burnaby, Betty Chester, Charles Childerstone, Gilbert Childs, Laddie Cliff, Mimi Crawford, Melville Gideon, Stanley Holloway, Mary Leigh, Elsa MacFarlane, Austin Melford, Phyllis Monkman, Herbert Mundin, Elsie Randolph, Cyril Ritchard, Babs Valerie and Clifford Witley.

== Film artists ==
Artists performing in the film were Davy Burnaby, Phyllis Monkman, Gilbert Childs, Laddie Cliff, Melville Gideon, Stanley Holloway, Betty Chester, Elsa MacFarlane, Peggy Petronella, and Harry S. Pepper.
