= William Kendall (actor) =

British actor (1903–1984)

- William Kendall in A Touch Of Larceny 1959
- Born: 26 August 1903; London, England, UK
- Died: 1 April 1984 (aged 80)

William Kendall (born 26 August 1903 in London, England – died 1 April 1984, aged 80) was a British film, stage and television actor. He appeared in the West End in several musicals starring Jack Buchanan including Mr. Whittington, Castle in the Air and This'll Make You Whistle. He starred in the 1953 play Four Winds by Alex Atkinson and the 1956 play Towards Zero by Agatha Christie.

== Filmography ==
- Face to Face (1922) as Bert Manners
- Goodnight, Vienna (1932) as Ernst
- The King's Cup (1933) as Captain Richards
- That's a Good Girl (1933) as Timothy
- Doctor's Orders (1934) as Jackson
- Debt of Honour (1936) as Paul Martin
- This'll Make You Whistle (1936) as Reggie Benson
- Sweet Devil (1938) as Edward Bane
- The Sky's the Limit (1938) as Thornwell Beamish
- Blind Folly (1939) as Raine
- Dance, Little Lady (1954) as Mr. Matthews
- Jumping for Joy (1956) as Blenkinsop
- Strictly Confidential (1959) as Major Rory McQuarry
- Idol on Parade (1959) as Commanding Officer
- Left Right and Centre (1959) as Right - Pottle
- A Touch of Larceny (1959) as Tom
- The Trials of Oscar Wilde (1960) as Lord Ashford
- The Two Faces of Dr. Jekyll (1960) as Clubman (uncredited)
- Sands of the Desert (1960) as British Consul
- Alfred Hitchcock Presents (1961) (Season 7 Episode 9: "I Spy") as Captain Morgan
- Live Now – Pay Later (1962) as Major Simpkins
- The Great St Trinian's Train Robbery (1966) as Mr. Parker
- The Jokers (1967) as Major General Jeffcock
- Some Girls Do (1969) as Wing Commander Aston (uncredited)
- The Assassination Bureau (1969) as M. Marivaux at 'La Belle Amie' (uncredited)
