= Jean Gillie =

British actress (1915–1949)

- Born: Jean Mabel Coomber; 14 October 1915; London, England
- Died: 19 February 1949 (aged 33); London, England
- Occupation: Actress
- Years active: 1935–1947
- Spouse: Jack Bernhard (1944–47; divorced)

Jean Gillie (born Jean Mabel Coomber; 14 October 1915 – 19 February 1949) was an English film actress of the 1930s and 1940s. Gillie appeared in 20 British and two American films.

== Career ==
Gillie broke into films in 1935 in While Parents Sleep. She quickly chalked up a number of credits in quota quickie productions. Most of these were comedic in nature, and Gillie's good looks and apparent aptitude for comedy attracted the attention of stage star Jack Buchanan, who pushed for her to be cast in the 1936 screen version of This'll Make You Whistle in which he was to star.

She acquitted herself well in the film, showing a natural talent for playing comedy, and over the next few years went on to appear in a series of madcap roles in films such as The Girl in the Taxi (1937), Sweet Devil (1938) and Tilly of Bloomsbury (1940).

Gillie made no films in 1941 or 1942, but returned to the screen in 1943 in a straight dramatic role as one of the lead players in Leslie Howard's wartime propaganda piece The Gentle Sex. This was followed by The Saint Meets the Tiger, notable as the first time her character Patricia Holm (the love interest of Simon Templar aka The Saint) was ever featured on screen in any film adaptation of a novel from the Leslie Charteris The Saint canon. 1944 saw Gillie starring in the whimsical propaganda drama Tawny Pipit, while her last British film Flight from Folly (1945) marked a return to comedy.

During the war, Gillie met American film director Jack Bernhard while he was on military service and stationed in Britain. The couple married on 5 May 1944, and after the end of the war went to live in the United States. Gillie made her American screen debut in 1946 in the cult film noir Decoy, directed by Bernhard.

This was a radical departure from any role she had played before, casting her as a devious— femme fatale. A contemporary reviewer commented: "It's been a long time since the screen has seen a more sinister feminine character than the one which Jean Gillie plays in Decoy"

The film was a Poverty Row production from Monogram Pictures, fading from view after its original cinema run and remaining little-known and largely unseen for many years. Later, however, it has gained an appreciative new audience among film noir aficionados after being included in Volume 4 of the Warner Bros. issued DVD series Film Noir Classics Collection, released in the US in 2007, when it was described in Entertainment Weekly as a "weird but transfixing tale".

In 1947 Gillie appeared in the Gregory Peck vehicle The Macomber Affair, which turned out to be her final film. Her marriage to Bernhard had quickly run into trouble, and the couple divorced.

== Death ==
Gillie returned to Britain in 1948 but had no time to revive her British career, as she died of pneumonia on 19 February 1949, aged 33.

== Partial filmography ==
- Brewster's Millions (1935) – Miss Tompkins (uncredited)
- Smith's Wives (1935) – Anne
- It Happened in Paris (1935) – Musette
- School for Stars (1935) – Joan Martin
- While Parents Sleep (1935) – Bubbles Thompson
- His Majesty and Company (1935) – Nina
- This'll Make You Whistle (1936) – Joan Longhurst
- The Girl in the Taxi (1937) – Jacqueline des Aubrais
- The Live Wire (1937) – Sally Barton
- Sweet Devil (1938) – Jill Turner
- What Would You Do, Chums? (1939) – Lucy
- The Spider (1940) – Clare Marley
- The Middle Watch (1940) – Betty Hewett
- Tilly of Bloomsbury (1940) – Tilly Welwyn
- Sailors Don't Care (1940) – Nancy
- The Call for Arms (1940, Short) – Irene
- The Gentle Sex (1943) – Dot Hopkins
- The Saint Meets the Tiger (1943) – Pat Holm
- Tawny Pipit (1944) – Nancy Forester
- Flight from Folly (1945) – Millicent
- Decoy (1946) – Margot Shelby
- The Macomber Affair (1947) – Aimee (final film role)
