= Elsie Randolph =

English actress (1904–1982)

- Picturegoer postcard
- Born: 9 December 1904; London, England
- Died: 15 October 1982 (aged 77); London, England
- Occupations: Actress, singer, dancer
- Years active: 1931–1981
- Spouse: Vernon Page (1946 – 1959) (his death)

Elsie Randolph (9 December 1904 – 15 October 1982) was an English actress, singer and dancer. Randolph was born and died in London.

She is best remembered for her partnership with Jack Buchanan in several stage and film musicals. She also appeared in two of Alfred Hitchcock's British films, made 40 years apart.

One of her final roles was a guest part in the 1981 television series Funny Man set in the music halls of the late 1920s.

Her papers are in the collection of the University of Birmingham that also has performance details in its collection.

== Theatre credits (all London productions) ==
- 1919 The Girl for the Boy
- 1920 The Naughty Princess
- 1921 My Nieces
- 1922 His Girl
- 1923 Battling Buttler
- 1924
  - Toni
  - Madame Pompadour
- 1925 Boodle
- 1926 Sunny
- 1927 Peggy-Ann
- 1928 That's a Good Girl
- 1929 Follow Through
- 1930
  - The Co-Optimists
  - The Wonder Bar
- 1931 Stand Up and Sing
- 1934 Mr. Whittington
- 1935 Charlot's Char-a-Bang
- 1936 This'll Make You Whistle
- 1942 The Maid of the Mountains
- 1943 It's Time To Dance
- 1945 Great Day

== Filmography ==
=== Film credits ===
- Rich and Strange (1931) as The Old Maid
- Life Goes On (1932) as Phoebe Selsey
- Brother Alfred (1932) as Mamie
- Yes, Mr Brown (1933) as Anne Weber
- That's a Good Girl (1933) as Joy Dean
- Night of the Garter (1933) as Jenny Warwick
- This'll Make You Whistle (1936) as Bobbie Rivers
- Smash and Grab (1937) as Alice Thornby / Alice Forrest
- Cheer the Brave (1951) as Doris Wilson
- Riders in the Sky (1968) as Nurse Henderson
- Frenzy (1972) as Gladys

=== Television appearances ===
- Harpers West One (1962) as Mrs. Barbara Cater
- The Jimmy Logan Show (1969)
- Fraud Squad (1970) as Agnes Holland
- ITV Sunday Night Theatre (1971) as Iris / Lilian
- Beryl's Lot (1973) as Madge Gold
- Father Brown (1974) as Miss Oliphant
- Within These Walls (1974–1978) as Mrs. Dobbing
- Thriller (1975) as Mrs. Fitch
- Z-Cars (1976) as Edna Allbright
- Seven Faces of Woman (1977) as Mrs. Gilmore
- Edward & Mrs. Simpson (1978) as Lady Colefax
- Quatermass (1979) as Woman Minister
- Company and Co (1980) as Mrs. Dersley
- ITV Playhouse (1981) as Mrs. Jackson
- Funny Man (1981) as Mary Hodge
- BBC2 Playhouse (1981) as Emmy (final appearance)

== Bibliography ==
- Stanley Green Encyclopedia of the Musical Theatre, Dodd, Mead, 1976
- Peter Gammond The Oxford Companion To Popular Music, Oxford University Press, 1991
