= Quelle drôle de gosse! =

- Directed by: Léo Joannon
- Written by: Yves Mirande
- Music by: Jean Lenoir; Georges van Parys
- Production company: Metropa-Film
- Release date: 17 May 1935 (France)
- Running time: 85 min
- Country: France
- Language: French

Quelle drôle de gosse! (aka: Mad Girl) is a 1935 French comedy drama film directed by Léo Joannon and written by Yves Mirande. The music score is by Jean Lenoir and Georges van Parys. It tells the story of a young secretary who falls in love with a wealthy young man, after unrequited love with her boss.

== Cast ==
- Albert Préjean as Gaston Villaret
- Danielle Darrieux as Lucie
- Lucien Baroux as Laquais
- Suzanne Desprès as Georgette
- André Roanne as Paul

== See also ==
- Sweet Devil (1938)
