= Settled Out of Court (film) =

1925 film

- Directed by: George A. Cooper
- Written by: Eliot Stannard
- Starring: Fay Compton; Jack Buchanan; Jeanne de Casalis
- Production company: Gaumont British Picture Corporation
- Distributed by: Gaumont British Distributors
- Release date: October 1925
- Running time: 90 minutes
- Country: United Kingdom
- Languages: Silent; English intertitles

Settled Out of Court is a 1925 British silent drama film directed by George A. Cooper and starring Fay Compton, Jack Buchanan and Jeanne de Casalis. The screenplay involves a husband whose attempts to escape from a loveless marriage end in tragedy.

== Cast ==
- Fay Compton as The Woman
- Jack Buchanan as The Husband
- Jeanne de Casalis as The Wife
- Leon Quartermaine as The Russian
- Kinsey Peile as The Count
- Malcolm Keen as The Detective
