= Kings Theatre, Southsea =

Theatre in Southsea, Portsmouth, England

Kings Theatre
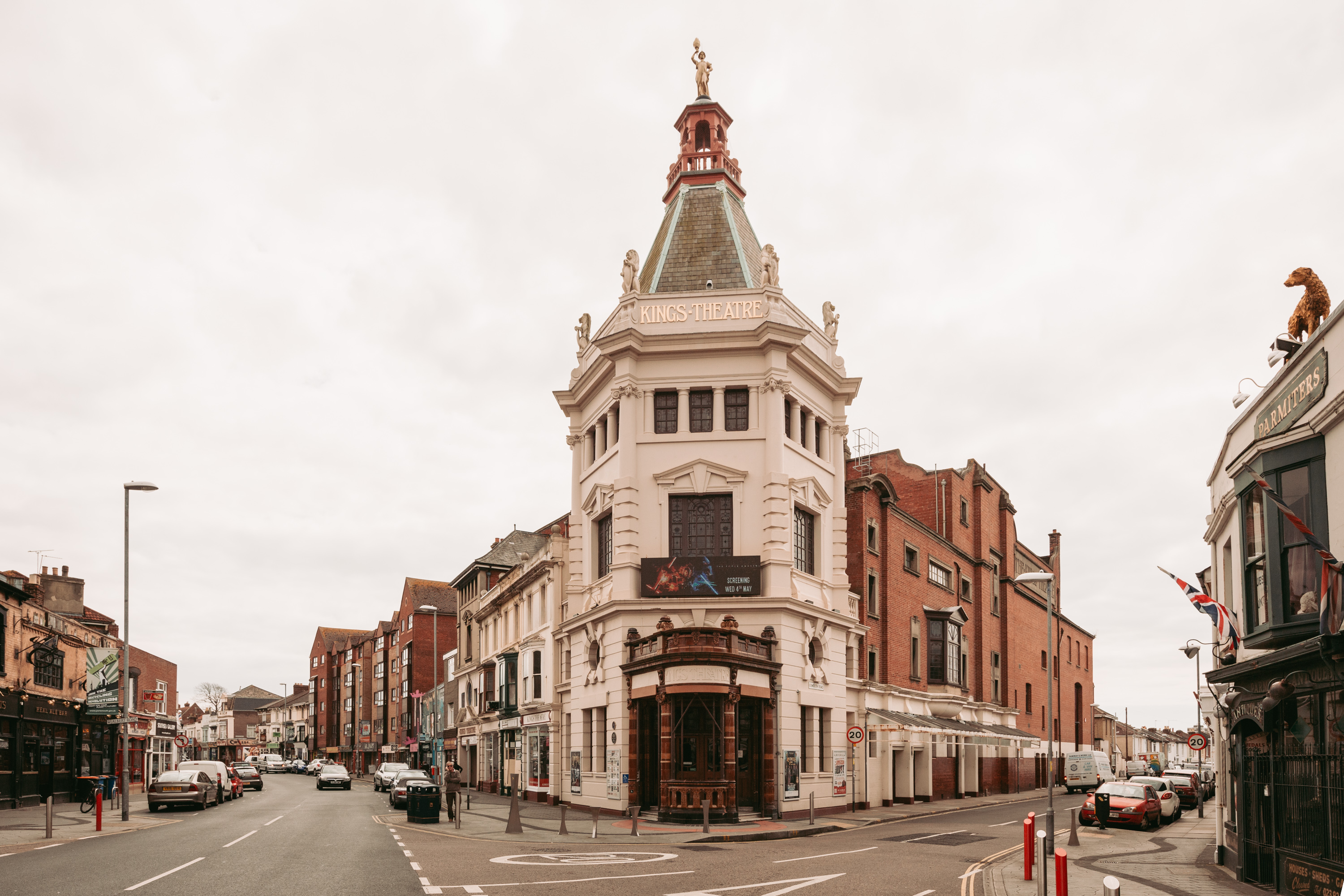
- Kings Theatre, 2014
- Interactive map of Kings Theatre
- Address: Albert Road; Portsmouth; England
- Coordinates: 50.787171°N 1.081313°W
- Owner: Kings Theatre Trust Ltd
- Capacity: 1,400
- Type: Large Scale Touring Venue
- Designation: Grade II*
- Current use: Large Scale Touring Venue

Construction
- Opened: 30 September 1907
- Years active: 30 September 1907 – present
- Architects: Frank Matcham

Listed Building – Grade II*
- Official name: The Kings Theatre, with numbers 24-28 (even) Albert Road, Southsea
- Designated: 4 March 1976
- Reference no.: 1386801

Website
- www.kingsportsmouth.co.uk

The Kings Theatre is a theatre in Southsea, Portsmouth, designed by the architect Frank Matcham. It is considered one of the most complete Matcham theatres in the UK. It opened on 30 September 1907. It is operated by the Kings Theatre Trust Ltd. The building was designated a Grade II* listed building in 1976.

== History ==
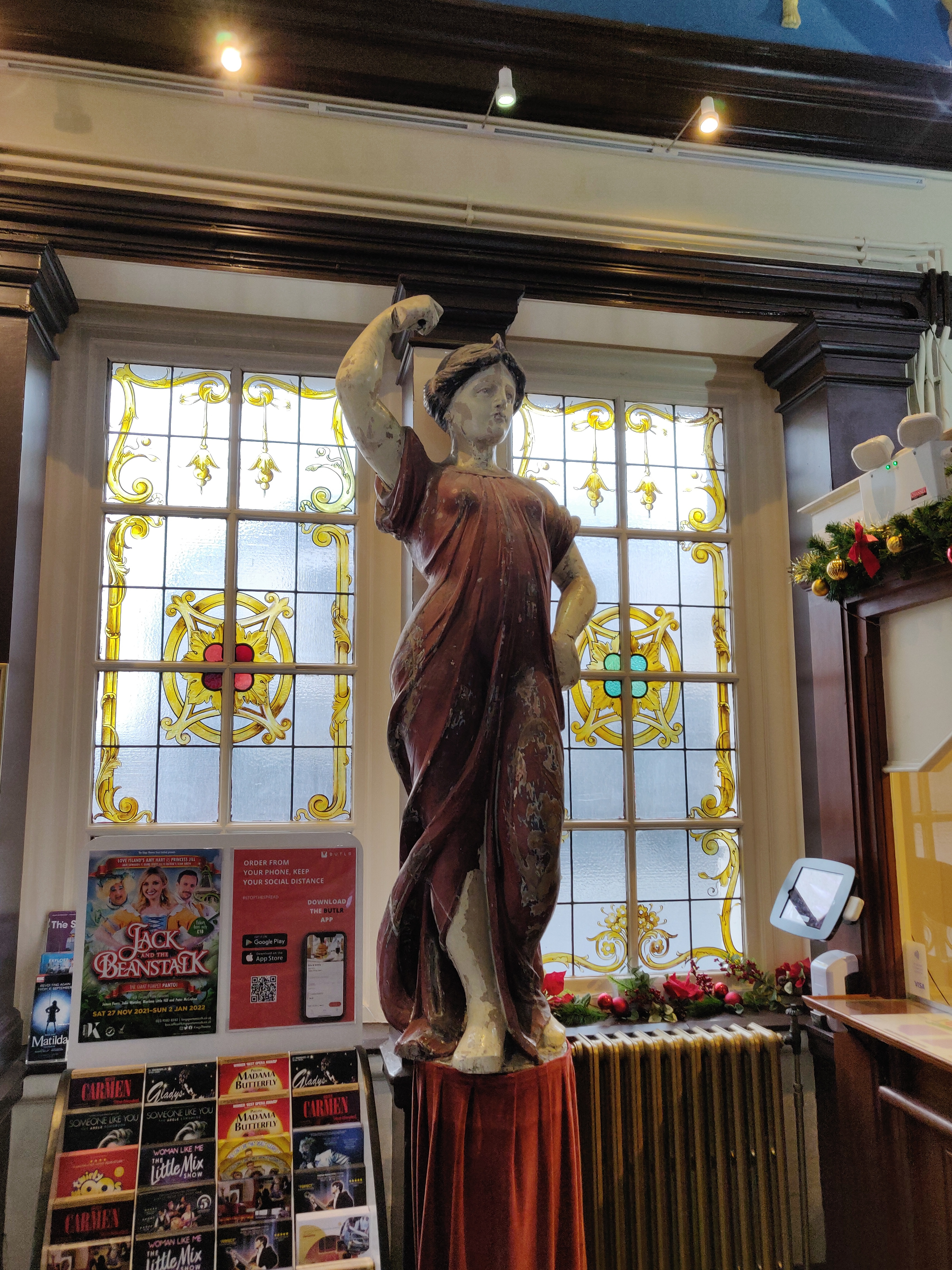
The original Lady Statue. It was placed on the top of the theatre until WW2. Then placed on the front portico from 1950s to 1980s. It disappeared until 1998 when discovered in a builders yard. She is now named Aurora after a naming competition.

The theatre opened on 30 September 1907 with a production of Charles I followed by two further of Sir Henry Irving's works. During the 1930s it was used to premiere several works by Ian Hay before they transferred to the West End including Orders Are Orders and Admirals All. The musical This'll Make You Whistle premiered there in 1935. The theater also showed a full cinema programme during the 1920s and early 1930s.

The theatre stayed in the control of its original owners, The Portsmouth Theatre Company, until 1964 when it was purchased by Commander Reggie & Mrs Joan Cooper. Performers during ther 20th century at the theatre included Noel Coward, Sean Connery, Rex Harrison and Spike Milligan among others. In 1974, director Ken Russell filmed the Pinball Wizard sequence of the rock opera Tommy at the theatre, featuring The Who and Elton John on the stage.

In 1990, the theatre was sold to Hampshire County Council. In 2001, after a successful campaign by AKTER (Action for Kings Theatre Restoration) to keep the theatre open, the theatre was purchased by Portsmouth City Council. It was then leased to the Kings Theatre Trust Ltd who undertook the restoration of the building. The present day theatre has a seating capacity of 1600 and a computerised booking system. Much of the backstage area is still fully manual, allowing it to retain the tag of a traditional hemp house, though powered flying bars have now been installed to allow large-scale productions.

=== Since 2000 ===
As part of the Centenary Project, the Kings Theatre underwent a significant refurbishment of the auditorium, including the ceiling between 2007 and 2009, at a cost of over £2 million. Beginning on 17 June 2007 the theatre was cleared and scaffolding was constructed to allow access to the higher areas of the auditorium. There was work to restore the decorations of the theatre and maintain the areas. Between October 2008 and February 2009, the original leaded dome, red painted wooden cupula, the deteriorated wooden statue (now named Aurora) and six lion figures was replicated in glassfibre by Jago Developments of Chichester and successfully installed by them (with the help of a 60-ton crane), along with a £200,000 restoration of the tower.

In 2016, a crowdfunding initiative was carried out to renovate the dress circle toilets.

In 2025, it was announced that the trust has received full planning and listed building consent for a £4.5 million project named 'Elevation 1907' to revitalise the theatre and reintegrate a nearby derelict Victorian terrace into the building. This included a new accessible entrance foyer, bar and rehearsal space. Work began on the project in March 2026.

== The Kings Theatre Trust Ltd ==
The Kings Theatre Trust Ltd. is a registered charity which oversees both the day-to-day running and the restoration of the building, as well as productions at the theatre. The restoration is in part funded by Portsmouth City Council and the Kings Theatre Trust.

== Shows ==
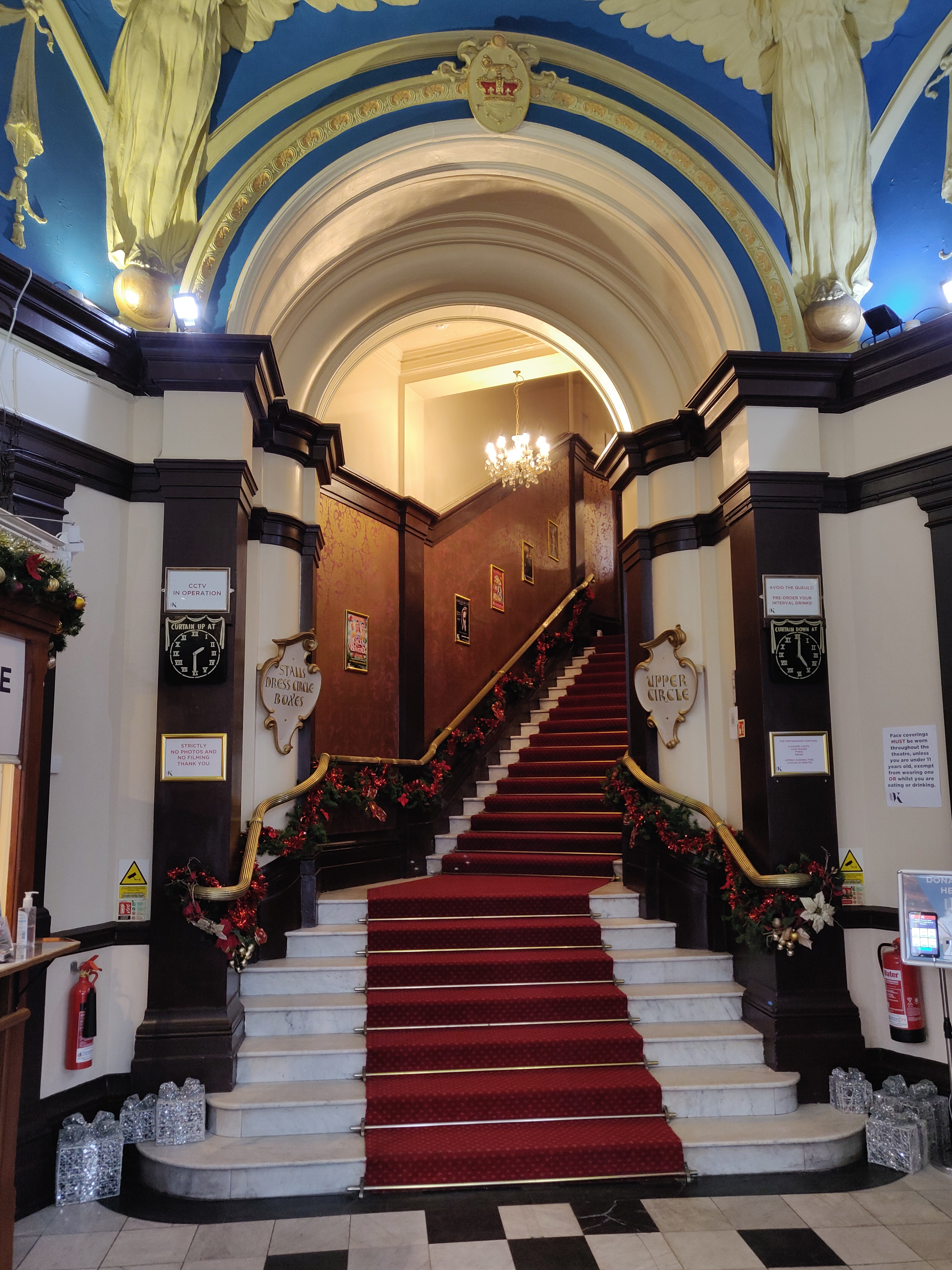
Stairs leading up from the lobby

Many one night touring shows come to the Kings Theatre, from ballet to rock music, through drama to children's shows and comedians.

Since the major restorations have been undertaken, the Kings Theatre has attracted large national touring productions such as "Chicago", "Beauty & The Beast", "MAMMA MIA!", "The Rocky Horror Show", "Evita" and "Grease".

The theatre is also host to many local drama societies including The Portsmouth Players, CCADs and South Downe Musical Society.

== Professional Productions ==
- The Sound of Music
- Mamma Mia!
- We Will Rock You
- The Play That Goes Wrong
- Avenue Q
- Grease
- Chicago
- Dreamboats and Petticoats
- Joseph and the Amazing Technicolor Dreamcoat
- Buddy
- The Mousetrap
- Seven Brides for Seven Brothers
- Copacabana
- The Woman in Black (25th Anniversary Touring Production)
- Calamity Jane
- Return to the Forbidden Planet (25th Anniversary Tour)
- The History Boys
- Hair
