= The Card (1922 film) =

1922 British film by A.V. Bramble

- Directed by: A. V. Bramble
- Written by: Eliot Stannard
- Based on: The Card; 1911 novel by Arnold Bennett
- Starring: Laddie Cliff; Hilda Cowley; Joan Barry; Mary Dibley
- Production company: Ideal Film Company
- Distributed by: Ideal Film Company
- Release date: April 1922
- Country: United Kingdom
- Language: English

The Card is a 1922 British comedy film directed by A. V. Bramble and starring Laddie Cliff, Hilda Cowley and Joan Barry. It is an adaptation of the 1911 novel The Card by Arnold Bennett.

== Cast ==
- Laddie Cliff as Denry Machin
- Hilda Cowley as Ruth Earp
- Joan Barry as Nellie Cotterill
- Mary Dibley as Countess of Chell
- Sidney Paxton as Councillor Cotterill
- Dora Gregory as Mrs Machin
- Norman Page as Mr Duncalf
- Arthur Cleave as Mr Shillitoe
- Jack Denton as Barlow
- Frank Goddard as boxer

== Bibliography ==
- Monk, Claire & Sergeant, Amy. British historical cinema: the history, heritage and costume film. Routledge, 2002.
