= Stanley Holloway =

British actor, singer and comedian (1890–1982)

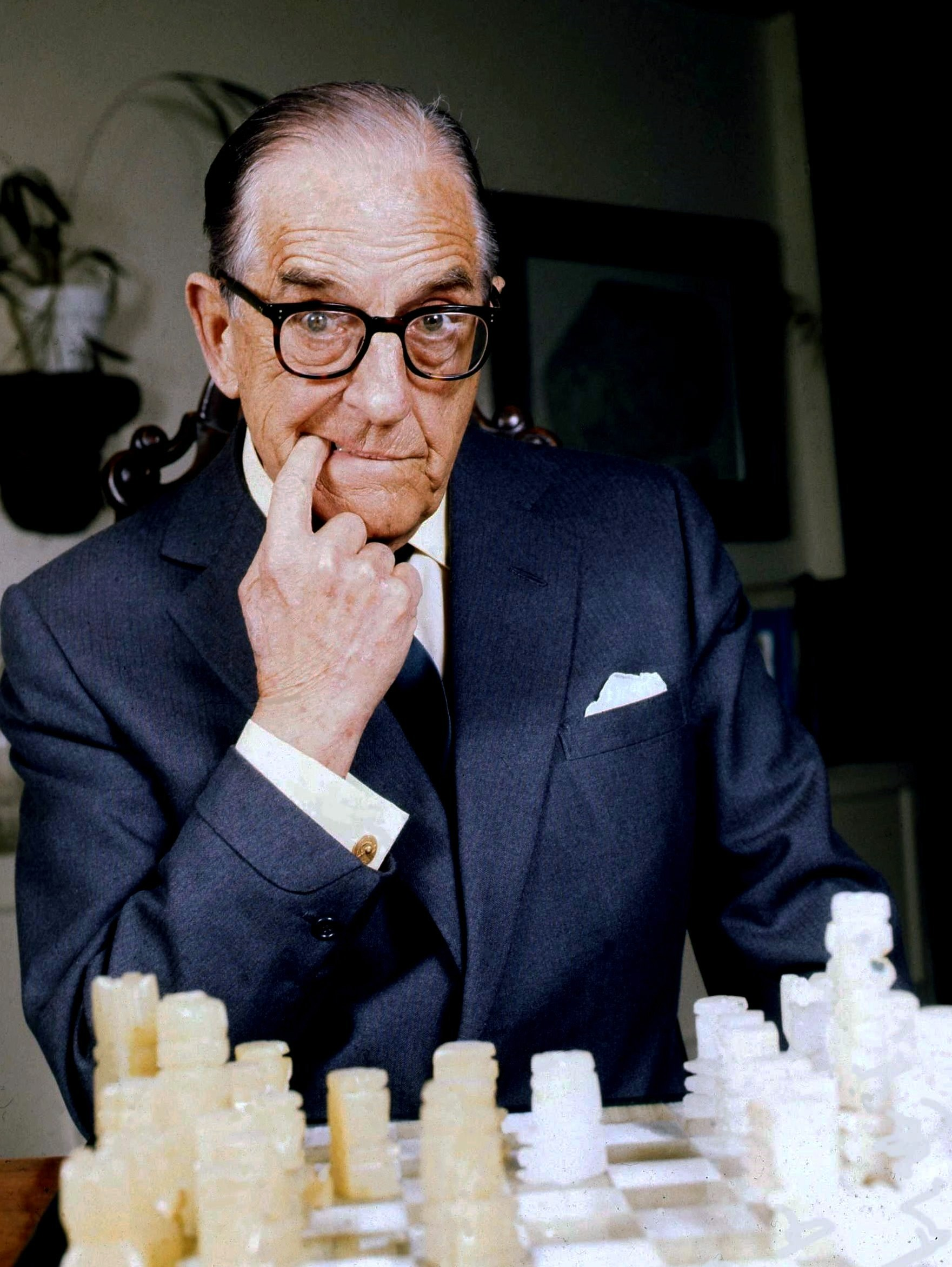
Holloway in 1974

Stanley Augustus Holloway (1 October 1890 – 30 January 1982) was an English actor, comedian, singer and monologist. He was famous for his comic and character roles on stage and screen, especially that of Alfred P. Doolittle in My Fair Lady. He was also renowned for his comic monologues and songs, which he performed and recorded throughout most of his 70-year career.

Born in Essex, Holloway pursued a career as a clerk in his teen years. He made early stage appearances before infantry service in the First World War, after which he had his first major theatre success starring in Kissing Time when the musical transferred to the West End from Broadway. In 1921, he joined a concert party, The Co-Optimists, and his career began to flourish. At first, he was employed chiefly as a singer, but his skills as an actor and reciter of comic monologues were soon recognised. Characters from his monologues such as Sam Small, invented by Holloway, and Albert Ramsbottom, created for him by Marriott Edgar, were absorbed into popular British culture, and Holloway developed a following for the recordings of his many monologues. By the 1930s, he was in demand to star in variety, pantomime and musical comedy, including several revues.

Following the outbreak of the Second World War, Holloway made short propaganda films on behalf of the British Film Institute and Pathé News and took character parts in a series of films including Major Barbara, The Way Ahead, This Happy Breed and The Way to the Stars. In the decade after the war, he appeared in the film Brief Encounter and made a series of films for Ealing Studios, including Passport to Pimlico, The Lavender Hill Mob and The Titfield Thunderbolt.

In 1956 he was cast as the irresponsible and irrepressible Alfred P. Doolittle in My Fair Lady, a role that he played on Broadway, the West End and in the film version in 1964. The role brought him international fame, and his performances earned him nominations for a Tony Award for Best Featured Actor in a Musical and an Academy Award for Best Supporting Actor. In his later years, Holloway appeared in television series in the UK and the US, toured in revues, appeared in stage plays in Britain, Canada, Australia and the US, and continued to make films into his eighties. Holloway was married twice and had five children, including the actor Julian Holloway.

== Biography ==
=== Family background and early life ===
Holloway was born in Manor Park, Essex (now in the London Borough of Newham), on 1 October 1890. He was the younger child and only son of George Augustus Holloway, a lawyer's clerk, and Florence May (née Bell), a housekeeper and dressmaker. He was named after Henry Morton Stanley, the journalist and explorer famous for his exploration of Africa and for his search for David Livingstone. (Note: In 1965, Holloway recorded the album Stanley – I Presume ... whose title echoes H. M. Stanley's celebrated line, "Dr. Livingstone, I presume.") There were theatrical connections in the Holloway family going back to Charles Bernard, an actor and theatre manager, who was the brother of Holloway's maternal grandmother. (Note: Charles Bernard was the father of Oliver Percy Bernard OBE MC (1881–1939), an English architect and scenic designer, who designed sets for Sir Thomas Beecham's Ring Cycle at Covent Garden.)

Holloway's paternal grandfather was Augustus Holloway, brought up in Poole, Dorset. Augustus became a wealthy shopkeeper, with a brush-making business. He married Amelia Catherine Knight in September 1856, and they had three children, Maria, Charles and George. In the early 1880s the family moved to Poplar, London. When Augustus died, George Holloway (Stanley's father) moved to nearby Manor Park and became a clerk for a city lawyer, Robert Bell. George married Bell's daughter Florence in 1884, and they had two children, Millie (1887–1949) and Stanley. George left Florence in 1905 and was never seen or heard from again by his family. (Note: George Augustus Holloway later remarried and moved to Forest Gate, East London. The England & Wales, National Probate Calendar (Index of Wills and Administrations), 1858–1966 shows George A. Holloway's death as being registered on 13 June 1919.)

During his early teenage years, Holloway attended the Worshipful School of Carpenters in nearby Stratford and joined a local choir, which he later called his "big moment". He left school at the age of 14 and worked as a junior clerk in a boot polish factory, where he earned ten shillings a week. He began performing part-time as Master Stanley Holloway – The Wonderful Boy Soprano from 1904, singing sentimental songs such as "The Lost Chord". A year later, he became a clerk at Billingsgate Fish Market, where he remained for two years before commencing training as an infantry soldier in the London Rifle Brigade in 1907.

=== Career ===
==== Early career and First World War ====
Leslie Henson, Holloway's early mentor, with Phyllis Dare in 1919

Holloway's stage career began in 1910, when he travelled to Walton-on-the-Naze to audition for The White Coons Show, a concert party variety show arranged and produced by Will C. Pepper, father of Harry S. Pepper, with whom Holloway later starred in The Co-Optimists. This seaside show lasted six weeks. From 1912 to 1914, Holloway appeared in the summer seasons at the West Cliff Gardens Theatre, Clacton-on-Sea, where he was billed as a romantic baritone.

In 1913 Holloway was recruited by the comedian Leslie Henson to feature as a support in Henson's more prestigious concert party called Nicely, Thanks. In later life, Holloway often spoke of his admiration for Henson, citing him as a great influence on his career. The two became firm friends and often consulted each other before taking jobs. (Note: Henson's death in 1957 came when Holloway was experiencing a career high in My Fair Lady, which had started on Broadway in 1956. Holloway recalled that Henson had been overlooked for the part of Alfred P. Doolittle when auditioning began in 1954, and Holloway wrote in his memoir that he regretted this deeply.) In his 1967 autobiography, Holloway dedicated a whole chapter to Henson, whom he described as "the greatest friend, inspiration and mentor a performer could have had". Later in 1913, Holloway decided to train as an operatic baritone, and so he went to Italy to take singing lessons from Ferdinando Guarino in Milan. However, a yearning to start a career in light entertainment and a contract to re-appear in Bert Graham and Will Bentley's concert party at the West Cliff Theatre caused him to return home after six months.

In the early months of 1914, Holloway made his first visit to the United States and then went to Buenos Aires and Valparaíso with the concert party The Grotesques. At the outbreak of the First World War in August 1914, he decided to return to England, but his departure was delayed for six weeks due to his contract with the troupe. At the age of 25, Holloway enlisted in the Connaught Rangers in which he was commissioned as a subaltern in December 1915 because of his previous training in the London Rifle Brigade. In 1916 he was stationed in Cork and fought against the rebels in the Easter Rising. Later that year, he was sent to France, where he fought in the trenches alongside Michael O'Leary, who was awarded the Victoria Cross for gallantry in February 1915. Holloway and O'Leary stayed in touch after the war and remained close friends.

Holloway spent much of his time in the later part of the war organising shows to boost army morale in France. One such revue, Wear That Ribbon, was performed in honour of O'Leary winning the VC. He, Henson and his newly established Star Attractions concert party, entertained the British troops in Wimereux. The party included such performers as Jack Buchanan, Eric Blore, Binnie Hale, and Phyllis Dare, as well as the performers who would later form The Co-Optimists. Upon his return from France, Holloway was stationed in Hartlepool, and immediately after the war ended he starred in The Disorderly Room with Leslie Henson, which Eric Blore had written while serving in the South Wales Borderers. The production toured theatres on England's coast, including Walton-on-the-Naze and Clacton-on-Sea.

==== Inter-war years ====
As René (centre) in A Night Out (1920)

After relinquishing his army commission in May 1919, Holloway returned to London and resumed his singing and acting career, finding success in two West End musicals at the Winter Garden Theatre. Later that month, he created the role of Captain Wentworth in Guy Bolton and P. G. Wodehouse's Kissing Time, followed in 1920 by the role of René in A Night Out. Following its provincial success, The Disorderly Room was given a West End production at the Victoria Palace Theatre in late 1919, in which Holloway starred alongside Henson and Tom Walls. Holloway made his film debut in a 1921 silent comedy called The Rotters.

From June 1921, Holloway had considerable success in The Co-Optimists, a concert party formed with performers whom he had met during the war in France, which The Times called "an all-star 'pierrot' entertainment in the West-end." It opened at the small Royalty Theatre and soon transferred to the much larger Palace Theatre, where the initial version of the show ran for over a year, giving more than 500 performances. The entertainment was completely rewritten at regular intervals to keep it fresh, and the final edition, beginning in November 1926, was the 13th version. The Co-Optimists closed in 1927 at His Majesty's Theatre after 1,568 performances over eight years. In 1929, a feature film version was made, with Holloway rejoining his former co-stars.

In 1923 Holloway established himself as a BBC Radio performer. The early BBC broadcasts brought variety and classical artists together, and Holloway could be heard in the same programme as the cellist John Barbirolli or the Band of the Scots Guards. He developed his solo act throughout the 1920s while continuing his involvement with the musical theatre and The Co-Optimists. In 1924 he made his first gramophone discs, recording for His Master's Voice two songs from The Co-Optimists: "London Town" and "Memory Street". After The Co-Optimists disbanded in 1927, Holloway played at the London Hippodrome in Vincent Youmans's musical comedy Hit the Deck as Bill Smith, a performance judged by The Times to be "invested with many shrewd touches of humanity". In The Manchester Guardian, Ivor Brown praised him for a singing style "which coaxes the ear rather than clubbing the head."

Holloway as Sam Small in Fine and Dandy with Leslie Henson

Holloway began regularly performing monologues, both on stage and on record, in 1928, with his own creation, Sam Small, in Sam, Sam, Pick oop thy Musket. (Note: Holloway had earlier performed R. P. Weston and Bert Lee's And yet I don't know at the Winter Garden Theatre in 1919. He later took up their numbers, Brahn Boots, With Her Head Tucked Underneath Her Arm and Yorkshire Puddin.) Over the following years, he recorded more than 20 monologues based around the character, most of which he wrote himself. He created Sam Small after Henson had returned from a tour of northern England and told him a story about an insubordinate old soldier from the Battle of Waterloo. Holloway developed the character, naming him after a Cockney friend of Henson called Annie Small; the name Sam was chosen at random. Holloway adopted a northern accent for the character. The Times commented, "For absolute delight ... there is nothing to compare with Mr. Stanley Holloway's monologue, concerning a military contretemps on the eve of Waterloo ... perfect, even to the curled moustache and the Lancashire accent of the stubborn Guardsman hero."

In 1929 Holloway played another leading role in musical comedy, Lieutenant Richard Manners in Song of the Sea, and later that year he performed in the revue Coo-ee, with Billy Bennett, Dorothy Dickson and Claude Hulbert. When The Co-Optimists re-formed in 1930, he rejoined that company, now at the Savoy Theatre, and at the same venue appeared in Savoy Follies in 1931, where he introduced to London audiences the monologue The Lion and Albert. (Note: The monologue has become known as Albert and the Lion, but the author, Marriott Edgar, called the piece The Lion and Albert. See copy deposited at the British Library.) The monologue was written by Marriott Edgar, who based the story on a news item about a boy who was eaten by a lion in the zoo. In the monologue, Mr. and Mrs. Ramsbottom react in a measured way when their son Albert is swallowed. Neither Edgar nor Holloway was convinced that the piece would succeed, but needing material for an appearance at a Northern Rugby League dinner Holloway decided to perform it. It was well received, and Holloway introduced it into his stage act. Subsequently, Edgar wrote 16 monologues for him. In its obituary of Holloway, The Times wrote that Sam and Albert "became part of English folklore during the 1930s, and they remained so during the Second World War." These monologues employed the Holloway style that has been called "the understated look-on-the-bright-side world of the cockney working class. ... Holloway's characters are [mischievous, like Albert, or] obstinate, and hilariously clueless. He often told his stories in costume; sporting outrageous attire and bushy moustaches." In 1932 Harry S. Pepper, with Holloway and others, revived the White Coons Concert Party show for BBC Radio.

Beginning in 1934, Holloway appeared in a series of British films, three of which featured his creation Sam Small. (Note: D'Ye Ken John Peel? (1934), Play up the Band (1935), and Sam Small at Westminster (1935), a propaganda film on behalf of the National Government.) He started his association with the filmmakers Ealing Studios in 1934, appearing in the fifth Gracie Fields picture Sing As We Go. His other films from the 1930s included Squibs (1935) and The Vicar of Bray (1937). In December 1934, Holloway made his first appearance in pantomime, playing Abanazar in Aladdin. In his first season in the part, he was overshadowed by his co-star, Sir Henry Lytton, as the Emperor, but he quickly became established as a favourite in his role, playing it in successive years in Leeds, London, Edinburgh and Manchester.

==== Second World War and post-war ====
On the outbreak of the Second World War in 1939 Holloway, who was 48, was too old for active service. Instead, he appeared in short propaganda pieces for the British Film Institute and Pathé News. He narrated documentaries aimed at lifting war-time morale in Britain, including Albert's Savings (1940), written by Marriott Edgar and featuring the character Albert Ramsbottom, and Worker and Warfront No.8 (1943), with a script written by E. C. Bentley about a worker who neglects to have an injury examined and contracts blood poisoning. Both films were included on a 2007 Imperial War Museum DVD Britain's Home Front at War: Words for Battle.

On stage during the war years, Holloway appeared in revues, first Up and Doing, with Henson, Binnie Hale and Cyril Ritchard in 1940 and 1941, and then Fine and Dandy, with Henson, Dorothy Dickson, Douglas Byng and Graham Payn. In both shows, Holloway presented new monologues, and The Times thought a highlight of Fine and Dandy was a parody of the BBC radio programme The Brains Trust, with Holloway "ponderously anecdotal" and Henson "gigglingly omniscient".

In 1941 Holloway took a character part in Gabriel Pascal's film of Bernard Shaw's Major Barbara, in which he played a policeman. He had leading parts in later films, including The Way Ahead (1944), This Happy Breed (1944) and The Way to the Stars (1945). After the war, he played Albert Godby in Brief Encounter and had a cameo role as the First Gravedigger in Laurence Olivier's 1948 film of Hamlet. In 1951 Holloway played the same role on the stage to the Hamlet of Alec Guinness. For Pathé News, he delivered the commentary for documentaries in a series called Time To Remember, where he narrated over old newsreels from significant dates in history from 1915 to 1942. (Note: The documentary films included: Your country needs you!, depicting 1915 (Kitchener's volunteer army, and the Dardanelles Commission); The better 'ole, depicting 1916 (life in the trenches, and the Eastern, Western and Home fronts); Enough of everything, depicting 1917 (the Russian Revolution, the US entry into the war, and women at work); Short sharp shower, depicting 1926 (the General Strike, international politics, weather, record breaking feats, the death of Rudolph Valentino and life in post-war Britain); and The end of the Beginning, depicting 1942 (including America's entry into the Second World War).) Holloway also starred in a series of films for Ealing Studios, beginning with Champagne Charlie in 1944 alongside Tommy Trinder. After that he made Nicholas Nickleby (1947) and Another Shore (1948). He next appeared in three of the most famous Ealing comedies, Passport to Pimlico (1949), The Lavender Hill Mob (1951) and The Titfield Thunderbolt (1953). His final film with the studio was Meet Mr. Lucifer (1953).

In 1948 Holloway conducted a six-month tour of Australia and New Zealand and supported by the band leader Billy Mayerl. He made his Australian début at the Tivoli Theatre, Melbourne, and recorded television appearances to publicise the forthcoming release of Passport to Pimlico. Holloway wrote the monologue Albert Down Under especially for the tour.

==== 1950s and 1960s stage and screen ====
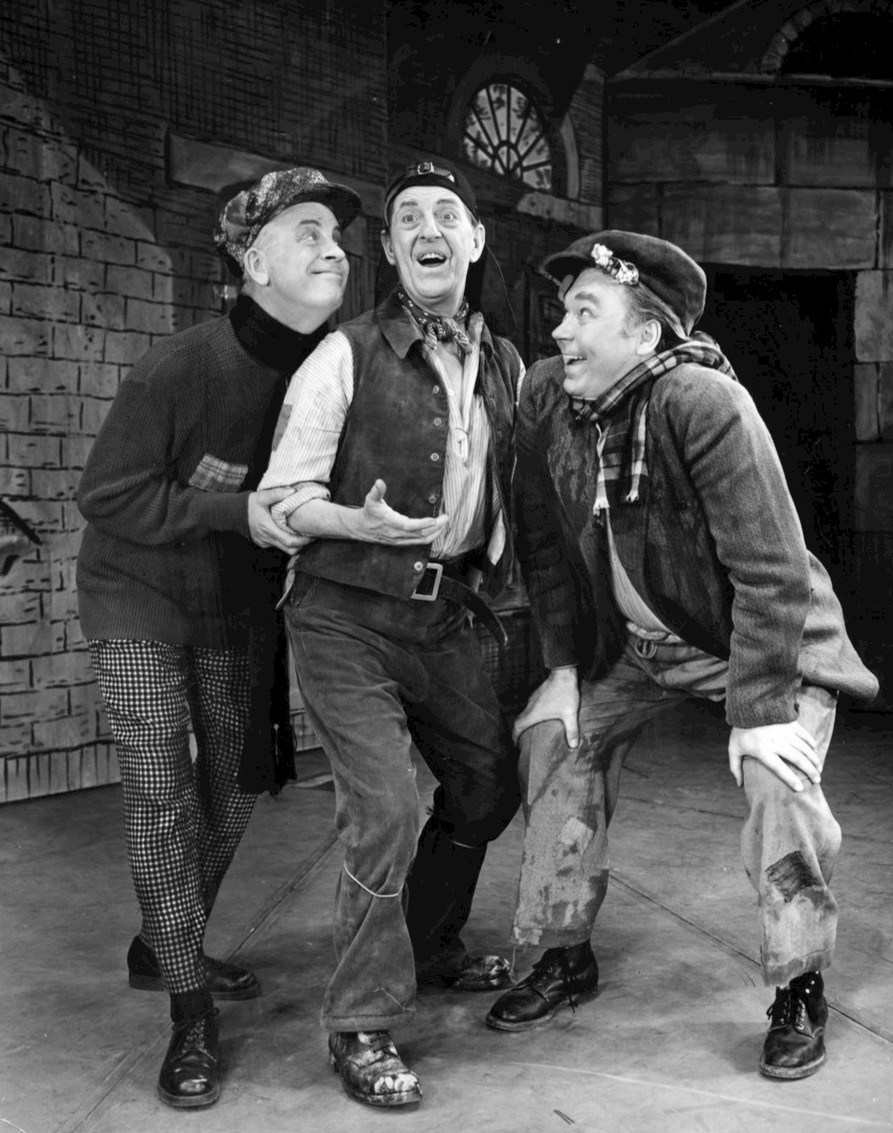
Holloway (centre) as Alfred P. Doolittle on Broadway in My Fair Lady, 1957

In 1954 Holloway joined the Old Vic theatre company to play Bottom in A Midsummer Night's Dream, with Robert Helpmann as Oberon and Moira Shearer as Titania. After playing at the Edinburgh Festival, the Royal Shakespeare Company took the production to New York, where it played at the Metropolitan Opera House and then on tour of the US and Canada. The production was harshly reviewed by critics on both sides of the Atlantic, but Holloway made a strong impression. (Note: Both the anonymous critic of The Times and Brooks Atkinson in The New York Times thought the production slow and old-fashioned, and took particular exception to the use of Mendelssohn's incidental music. The performances of Holloway and his colleagues are preserved on an His Master's Voice sound recording of the production (His Master's Voice catalogue number ALP1262-4 (1955)). The Gramophone's critic wrote, "the great comedian Stanley Holloway retained his perfect timing but gave his lines their full Shakespearean weight".) Holloway said of the experience: "Out of the blue I was asked by the Royal Shakespeare Company to tour America with them, playing Bottom. ... From that American tour came the part of Alfred Doolittle in My Fair Lady and from then on, well, just let's say I was able to pick and choose my parts and that was very pleasant at my age." Holloway's film career continued simultaneously with his stage work; one example was the 1956 comedy Jumping for Joy. American audiences became familiar with his earlier film roles when the films began to be broadcast on television in the 1950s.

Mr. Stanley Holloway's undeserving dustman [Doolittle] is a pure joy. It is a turn from the old music hall, broad and full-blooded.

— The Times, 1 May 1958

In 1956 Holloway created the role of Alfred P. Doolittle in the original Broadway production of My Fair Lady. The librettist, Alan Jay Lerner, remembered in his memoirs that Holloway was his first choice for the role, even before it was written. Lerner's only concern was whether, after so long away from the musical stage, Holloway still had his resonant singing voice. Holloway reassured him over a lunch at Claridge's: Lerner recalled, "He put down his knife and fork, threw back his head and unleashed a strong baritone note that resounded through the dining room, drowned out the string quartet and sent a few dozen people off to the osteopath to have their necks untwisted." Holloway had a long association with the show, appearing in the original 1956 Broadway production at the Mark Hellinger Theatre, the 1958 London version at the Theatre Royal, Drury Lane, and the film version in 1964, which he undertook instead of the role of Admiral Boom in Mary Poppins that he had been offered the same year. In The Manchester Guardian, Alistair Cooke wrote, "Stanley Holloway distils into the body of Doolittle the taste and smell of every pub in England." Also in 1964, he appeared as Bellomy in the Hallmark Hall of Fame television production of The Fantasticks.

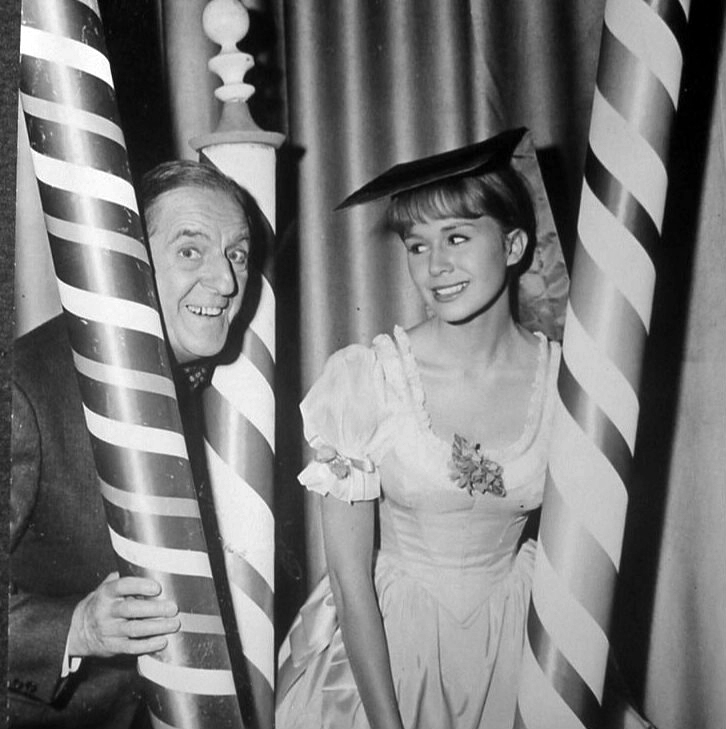
Holloway and Regina Groves in Our Man Higgins, 1962

Looking back in 2004, Holloway's biographer Eric Midwinter wrote, "With his cockney authenticity, his splendid baritone voice, and his wealth of comedy experience, he made a great success of this role, and, as he said, it put him 'bang on top of the heap, in demand' again at a time when, in his mid-sixties, his career was beginning to wane". His performances earned him a Tony Award nomination for Best Featured Actor in a Musical and an Academy Award nomination for Best Actor in a Supporting Role. Following his success on Broadway, Holloway played Pooh-Bah in a 1960 US television Bell Telephone Hour production of The Mikado, produced by the veteran Gilbert and Sullivan performer Martyn Green. Holloway appeared with Groucho Marx and Helen Traubel of the Metropolitan Opera. His notable films around this time included Alive and Kicking in 1959, co-starring Sybil Thorndike and Kathleen Harrison, and No Love for Johnnie in 1961 opposite Peter Finch. In 1962, Holloway took part in a studio recording of Oliver! with Alma Cogan and Violet Carson, in which he played Fagin.

In 1962 Holloway played the role of an English butler called Higgins in a US television sitcom called Our Man Higgins. It ran for only a season. His son Julian also appeared in the series. In 1964 he again appeared on stage in Philadelphia in Cool Off!, a short-lived Faustian spoof. He returned to the US a few more times after that to take part in The Dean Martin Show three times and The Red Skelton Show twice. He also appeared in the 1965 war film In Harm's Way, together with John Wayne and Kirk Douglas.

==== Last years ====
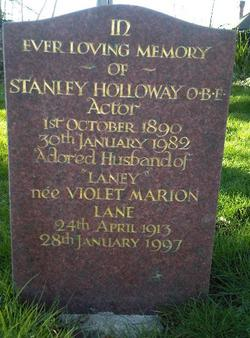
Holloway's grave at East Preston, West Sussex

Holloway appeared for the first time in a major British television series in the BBC's 1967 adaptation of P. G. Wodehouse's Blandings Castle stories, playing Beach, the butler, to Ralph Richardson's Lord Emsworth. His portrayal of Beach was received with critical reservation, but the series was a popular success. (Note: The critic of The Observer wrote, "rather far from my conception of Beach. ... The original Beach is rotund and pompous with an overwhelming consciousness of his own superiority." The Guardian wrote, "his accent hovered quite unaccountably between mummerset and Mayo".) After My Fair Lady, Holloway was able to get film roles in Mrs. Brown You've Got A Lovely Daughter (1968), which featured the 1960s British pop group Herman's Hermits, The Private Life of Sherlock Holmes, Flight of the Doves and Up the Front, all in the early 1970s. His final film was Journey into Fear (1974).

In 1970, Holloway began an association with the Shaw Festival in Canada, playing Burgess in Candida. He made what he considered his West End debut as a straight actor in Siege by David Ambrose at the Cambridge Theatre in 1972, (Note: Holloway did not count his appearances as First Gravedigger and Bottom, because he did not regard Shakespeare as straight theatre.) co-starring with Alastair Sim and Michael Bryant. He returned to Shaw and Canada, playing the central character Walter/William in You Never Can Tell in 1973.

Holloway continued to perform until well into his eighties, touring Asia and Australia in 1977 together with Douglas Fairbanks Jr. and David Langton in The Pleasure of His Company, by Samuel A. Taylor and Cornelia Otis Skinner. He made his last appearance performing at the Royal Variety Performance at the London Palladium in 1980, aged 89.

Holloway died of a stroke at the Nightingale Nursing Home in Littlehampton, West Sussex, on 30 January 1982, aged 91. He is buried, along with his wife Violet, at St Mary the Virgin Church in East Preston.

=== Personal life ===
Holloway was married twice, first to Alice "Queenie" Foran. They met in June 1913 in Clacton, while he was performing in a concert party and she was selling charity flags on behalf of the Royal National Lifeboat Institution. Queenie was orphaned at the age of 16, something that Holloway felt they had in common, as his mother had died that year and his father had earlier abandoned the family. He married Queenie in November 1913.

Holloway and Queenie had four children: Joan, born on Holloway's 24th birthday in 1914, Patricia (b. 1920), John (1925–2013) and Mary (b. 1928). Upon the death of her mother, Queenie inherited some property in Southampton Row and relied on the rents from the property for her income. During the First World War, while Holloway was away fighting in France, Queenie began to have financial trouble, as the tenants failed to pay their rent. Out of desperation, she approached several loan sharks, incurring a large debt about which Holloway knew nothing. She also started to drink heavily as the pressures from the war and of supporting her daughter took their toll. On Holloway's return from the war, the debt was paid off and they moved to Hampstead, West London. By the late 1920s, Holloway found himself in financial difficulties with the British tax authorities and was briefly declared bankrupt. In the 1930s, Holloway and Queenie moved to Bayswater and remained there until Queenie's death in 1937 at the age of 45, from cirrhosis of the liver. Of the children from this first marriage, John worked as an engineer in an electrics company, and Mary worked for BP for many years.

On 2 January 1939, Holloway married the 25-year-old actress and former chorus dancer Violet Marion Lane (1913–1997), and they moved to Marylebone. Violet was born into a working-class family from Leeds. (Note: Violet's mother was Scottish, and her civil engineer father, Alfred Lane, was a Yorkshireman.) Although he was a client of the Aza Agency in London, Violet effectively managed Holloway's career, and no project was taken on without her approval. In his autobiography, Holloway said of her, "I suppose I am committing lawful bigamy. Not only is she my wife, lover, mother, cook, chauffeuse, private secretary, house keeper, hostess, electrician, business manager, critic, handy woman, she is also my best friend." Together, they had one son, Julian, whose brief relationship with Tessa Dahl produced a daughter, the model and author Sophie Dahl. (Note: Holloway appeared with Neal in the 1965 film In Harm's Way.)

Holloway, Violet and Julian lived mainly in the tiny village of Penn, Buckinghamshire. Holloway also owned other properties including a flat in St John's Wood in North West London, which he used when working in the capital, and a flat in Manhattan during the My Fair Lady Broadway years. The final years of his life were spent in Angmering, West Sussex, with Violet. Holloway forged close friendships with fellow performers including Leslie Henson, Gracie Fields, Maurice Chevalier, Laurence Olivier and Arthur Askey, who said of him, "He was the nicest man I ever knew. He never had a wrong word to say about anyone. He was a great actor, a super mimic and a one-man walking comic show." While working in the US, Holloway numbered among his friends Frank Sinatra, Dean Martin, Burgess Meredith and Groucho Marx.

== Honours, memorials and books ==
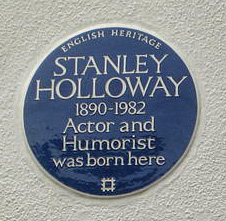
Plaque at Holloway's birthplace

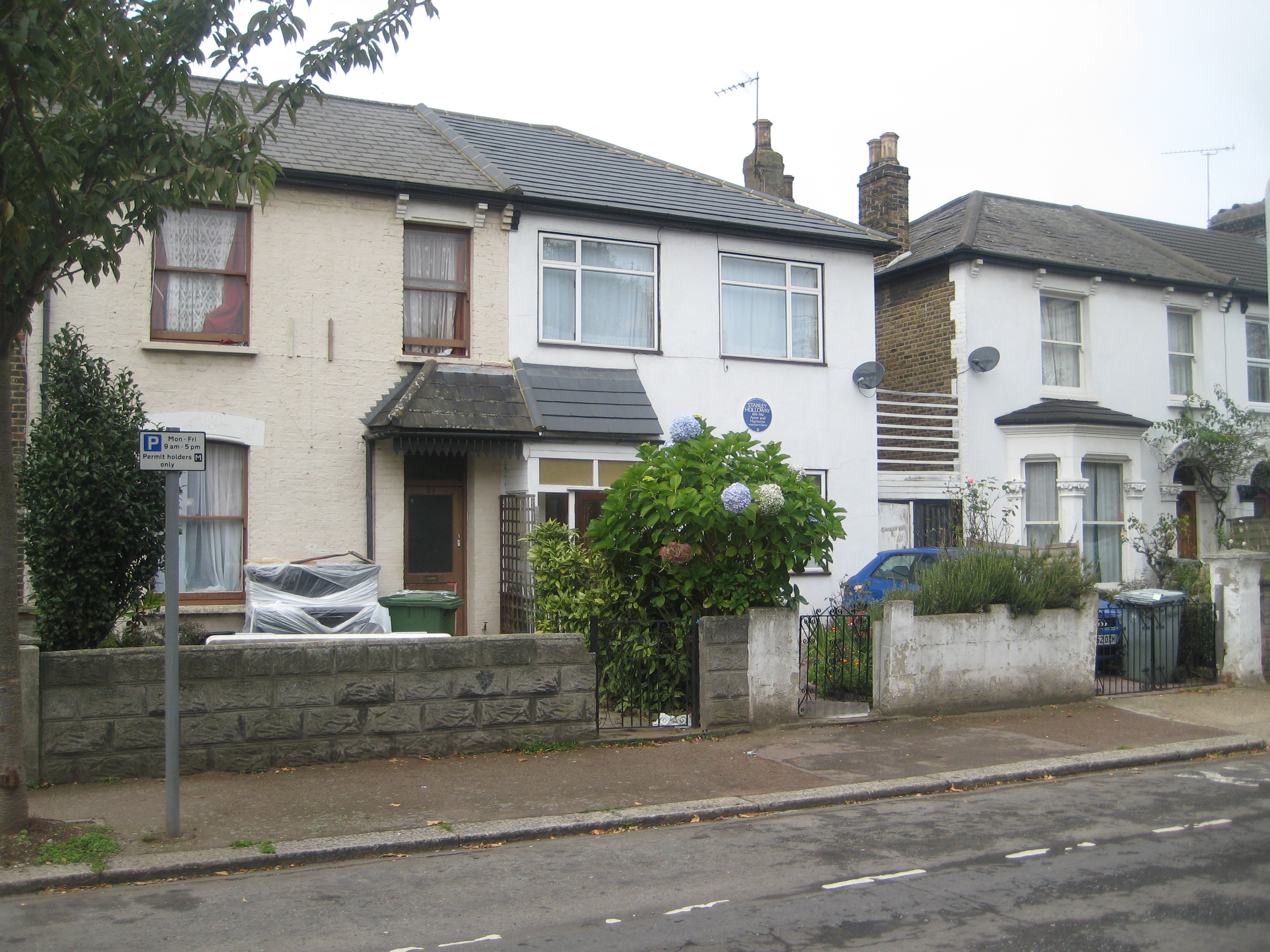
Holloway's birthplace, 25 Albany Road, Manor Park

Holloway was appointed an Officer of the Order of the British Empire (OBE) in the 1960 New Year Honours for his services to entertainment. In 1978 he was honoured with a special award by the Variety Club of Great Britain.

There is a memorial plaque dedicated to Holloway in St Paul's, Covent Garden, London, which is known as "the actors' church". In 2009 English Heritage unveiled a blue plaque at 25 Albany Road, Manor Park, Essex, the house in which he was born in 1890. There is a building named after him at 2 Coolfin Road, Newham, London, called Stanley Holloway Court.

Holloway entitled his autobiography Wiv a Little Bit o' Luck after the song he performed in My Fair Lady. The book was ghostwritten by the writer and director Dick Richards and published in 1967. (Note: The chapters of the book are: 1. On Nodding Terms with the Bard. Shakespearian roles and Shakespearian connections with his great uncle Charles Bernard (pp. 7–15); 2. The Co-Ops gather. Life within The Co-Optimists; 3. The Boy Soprano Branches Out. Birth, childhood, family life and early career; 4. Love Marriage and a Sad Ending. Marriage, death of first wife Alice Foran, his first four children; 5. Sam Albert and Stan. Early monologues and entry into mainstream entertainment; 6. The Street Where She Lived. Broadway and West End productions of My Fair Lady; 7. Broadway – and the Television Jungle – Other Broadway productions and American TV appearances; 8. Are Women Funny? – Yes Some!. Female comedians whom he admired; 9. Life with Laney. Second marriage to Violet and birth of son Julian; 10. Bring on the Clowns. Male comedians whom he admired and working with other performers; 11. Me-or a Semi Profile. Likes, dislikes, home life, outlook on life, other opinions; 12. Light Up The Stage. Various stage performances, especially Doolittle; 13. By Holloway Command. Receiving the OBE and performers he would pick for a fictional show; 14. Movie-Go-Round. Film career; 15. There are Agents-and Agents. Relationship with the Aza Agency and other agents; 16. The Lovable Jester. Life and death of his best friend Leslie Henson; 17. Shakespeare – Thou Art Translated. Revisits Shakespeare roles and relationships with actors of that genre; 18. Canadian Capers. Work on Canadian TV and holiday there with Julian; 19. In Glorious Technicolor. Film version of My Fair Lady; 20. A Great Life. Career, love for family, friends and life.) Holloway oversaw the publication of three volumes of the monologues by or associated with him: Monologues (1979); The Stanley Holloway Monologues (1980); and More Monologues (1981).

== Recordings ==
Holloway had a 54-year recording career, beginning in the age of acoustic recording, and ending in the era of the stereophonic LP. He mainly recorded songs from musicals and revues, and he recited many monologues on various subjects. Most prominent among his recordings (aside from his participation in recordings of My Fair Lady) are those of three series of monologues that he made at intervals throughout his career. They featured Sam Small, Albert Ramsbottom, and historical events such as the Battle of Hastings, Magna Carta and the Battle of Trafalgar. In all, his discography runs to 130 recordings, spanning the period 1924 to 1978. A review in The Gramophone of one of his 1957 albums containing recordings of his old "concert party" songs commented, "what a fine voice he has and how well he can use it – diction, phrasing, range and the interpretative insight of the artist".

== Sources ==
- Andrews, Julie (2007). An Intimate Biography. London: Portrait. ISBN 978-0-7499-5135-1.
- Gaye, Freda, ed. (1967). Who's Who in the Theatre (14th ed.). London: Sir Isaac Pitman and Sons. OCLC 420172806.
- Graham, Bert (1914). West Cliff Gardens Theatre Accounts Book. West Cliff Gardens Theatre.
- Holloway, Stanley; Richards, Dick (1967). Wiv a little bit o' luck: The life story of Stanley Holloway. London: Frewin. OCLC 3647363.
- Lerner, Alan Jay (1980). The Street Where I Live. London: Coronet Books. ISBN 0-340-25453-X.
- Maltin, Leonard (2008). 2009 Movie Guide. New York: Penguin. ISBN 978-0-452-28978-9.
- Morley, Sheridan (1986). The Great Stage Stars. London: Angus and Robertson. ISBN 0-8160-1401-9.
