= That's a Good Girl =

- Original trade ad
- Directed by: Jack Buchanan
- Written by: Jack Buchanan; Douglas Furber (play); Donovan Pedelty
- Produced by: Herbert Wilcox
- Starring: Jack Buchanan; Elsie Randolph; Dorothy Hyson
- Cinematography: Freddie Young
- Edited by: Merrill G. White
- Production company: British and Dominions
- Distributed by: United Artists
- Release date: 27 September 1933
- Running time: 83 minutes
- Country: United Kingdom
- Language: English

That's a Good Girl is a 1933 British comedy film directed by Jack Buchanan and starring Buchanan, Elsie Randolph and Dorothy Hyson. The film was based on a musical show of the same title that opened at the Empire Theatre, Cardiff on 6 February 1928, in which Jack Buchanan also starred. The music was written by Joseph Meyer and Phil Charig, with lyrics by Douglas Furber. The film omitted much of the music of the original show (and all of Ira Gershwin's contributions to the lyrics), but popularised one song in particular, Fancy our Meeting. The song remained a Jack Buchanan favourite and a version of it was also recorded by Al Bowlly shortly after the film's release.

The film was made at British and Dominion Elstree Studios, and its sets were designed by the art director Lawrence P. Williams.

== Cast ==
- Jack Buchanan as Jack Barrow
- Elsie Randolph as Joy Dean
- Dorothy Hyson as Moya Malone
- Garry Marsh as Francis Moray
- Vera Pearce as Suny Berata
- William Kendall as Timothy
- Kate Cutler as Helen Malone
- Frank Stanmore as Malone
- Anthony Holles as Canzone

== Bibliography ==
- Low, Rachael. Filmmaking in 1930s Britain. George Allen & Unwin, 1985.
- Wood, Linda. British Films, 1927-1939. British Film Institute, 1986.
