= Strictly Confidential (1959 film) =

1959 British film by Charles Saunders

- Original British quad poster
- Directed by: Charles Saunders
- Screenplay by: Brock Williams (& original story)
- Produced by: Guido Coen
- Starring: Richard Murdoch; William Kendall; Maya Koumani
- Cinematography: Walter J. Harvey
- Edited by: Peter Pitt
- Music by: Malcolm Lockyer
- Production company: A Twickenham Film Production
- Distributed by: Alliance Film Distributors Limited (U.K.); J. Arthur Rank Film Distributors (U.K.)
- Release date: 16 November 1959
- Running time: 62 minutes
- Country: United Kingdom
- Language: English

Strictly Confidential is a 1959 British second feature ('B') comedy film directed by Charles Saunders and starring Richard Murdoch, William Kendall, Maya Koumani and Neil Hallett. The screenplay was by Brock Williams. Two con-men, recently released from prison, are enlisted by a widow to help her recover control of her late husband's business.

== Plot ==
Released from prison, two genteel con-men, former Commander Binham-Ryley and former Major Rory McQuarry, target a beautiful and wealthy young widow who hires them to run her factory. What the crooks fail to realise is that Maxine Millard has devious schemes of her own in mind.

== Cast ==
- Richard Murdoch as Commander Binham-Ryley
- William Kendall as Major Rory McQuarry
- Maya Koumani as Maxine Millard
- Neil Hallett as Basil Wantage
- Bruce Seton as Inspector Shearing
- Ellis Irving as Captain Sharples
- Larry Burns as barman
- Llewellyn Rees as Mellinger
- William Hartnell as Grimshaw

== Critical reception ==
The Monthly Film Bulletin wrote: "A cheap and shoddy little farce in a long outmoded tradition. Vulgar double-entendres take the place of wit and the actors struggle helplessly against impossible odds. "
