= Sweet Devil =

- Directed by: René Guissart
- Written by: Yves Mirande (play Quelle drôle de gosse!); Geoffrey Kerr; Ralph Spence
- Produced by: Jack Buchanan
- Starring: Bobby Howes; Jean Gillie; William Kendall
- Cinematography: Bernard Browne
- Edited by: Charles Saunders
- Music by: Van Phillips
- Production company: Jack Buchanan Productions
- Distributed by: General Film Distributors
- Release date: January 1938
- Running time: 71 minutes
- Country: United Kingdom
- Language: English

Sweet Devil is a 1938 British musical comedy film directed by René Guissart and starring Bobby Howes, Jean Gillie and William Kendall. It was made at Pinewood Studios.

== Cast ==
- Bobby Howes as Tony Brent
- Jean Gillie as Jill Turner
- William Kendall as Edward Bane
- Syd Walker as Belton
- Ellis Jeffreys as Lady Tonbridge
- Glen Alyn as Sylvia Tonbridge
- Anthony Ireland as Senor Florez
- Hazel Terry as Rose
- Sylvia Leslie as Frances
- Syd Crossley as Police Constable
- Four New Yorkers as Specialty Act

== See also ==
- Quelle drôle de gosse! (1935)

== Bibliography ==
- Low, Rachael. Filmmaking in 1930s Britain. George Allen & Unwin, 1985.
- Wood, Linda. British Films, 1927-1939. British Film Institute, 1986.
