= Mr. Whittington =

1933 stage musical

- Written by: Clifford Grey; Greatrex Newman; Douglas Furber
- Music by: Johnny Green; Jack Waller; Joseph Tunbridge
- Original language: English
- Genre: Musical

Premiere
- Date premiered: 30 November 1933
- Place premiered: Alhambra Theatre, Glasgow

Mr. Whittington is a British musical with a book by Clifford Grey, Greatrex Newman and Douglas Furber and music by Johnny Green, Jack Waller and Joseph Tunbridge with additional lyrics provided by Edward Heyman. It was based on the traditional story of Dick Whittington, designed as a vehicle for the entertainer Jack Buchanan.

After premiering at the Alhambra Theatre, Glasgow in November 1933, it then transferred to London's West End where it ran for 300 performances between 1 February and 20 October 1934 initially at the London Hippodrome before transferring to the Adelphi Theatre. As well as Buchanan the original cast also included Elsie Randolph, Alfred Drayton, Fred Emney, William Kendall, Laurence Naismith and Kathleen Gibson.

== Bibliography ==
- Wearing, J. P. The London Stage 1930-1939: A Calendar of Productions, Performers, and Personnel. Rowman & Littlefield, 2014.
