= Her Heritage =

- Directed by: Bannister Merwin
- Written by: Arthur Weigall
- Starring: Jack Buchanan; Phyllis Monkman; Edward O'Neill
- Production company: Ward's Films
- Distributed by: Ward's Films
- Release date: March 1919
- Country: United Kingdom
- Languages: Silent; English intertitles

Her Heritage is a 1919 British silent crime film directed by Bannister Merwin and starring Jack Buchanan, Phyllis Monkman and Edward O'Neill.

== Cast ==
- Jack Buchanan as Bob Hales
- Phyllis Monkman as Lady Mary Strode
- E. Holman Clark as Gerald Pridling
- Edward O'Neill as Lord Heston
- Winifred Dennis as Mrs. Wilter

== Bibliography ==
- Burton, Alan & Chinbnall, Steve. Historical Dictionary of British Cinema. Scarecrow Press, 2013.
