= Over She Goes =

- Directed by: Graham Cutts
- Written by: Hugh Brooke; Stanley Lupino (play); Elizabeth Meehan
- Starring: Stanley Lupino; Claire Luce; Gina Malo; Sally Gray; Laddie Cliff; John Wood
- Cinematography: Otto Kanturek
- Edited by: Flora Newton
- Music by: Harry Acres
- Production company: Associated British Picture Corporation
- Distributed by: Associated British Picture Corporation
- Release date: 17 August 1937
- Running time: 78 minutes
- Country: United Kingdom
- Language: English

Over She Goes is a 1937 British musical comedy film directed by Graham Cutts and starring Stanley Lupino, Claire Luce, Laddie Cliff, Gina Malo and Max Baer. It was written by Hugh Brooke and Elizabeth Meehan based on the successful London stage play by Lupino, with music by Billy Mayerl. The film is an early example of the way American vaudeville tradition in film migrated in the United Kingdom.

== Plot ==
A music hall performer inherits an English title and estate, and invites his friends to stay with him where they are targeted by avaricious woman hoping for a rich marriage.

== Cast ==
- Stanley Lupino as Tommy Teacher
- Claire Luce as Pamela Ward
- Gina Malo as Dolly Jordan
- Max Baer as Silas Morner
- Laddie Cliff as Billy Bowler
- Sally Gray as Kitty
- Judy Kelly as Alice Mayhill
- John Wood as Harry, Lord Drewsden
- Syd Walker as Inspector Giffnock
- Bertha Belmore as Ethel, The Dowager Lady Drewsden
- Richard Murdoch as Sergeant Oliver
- Fred Hearne as Lord Drewsden
- Archibald Batty as Alfred

== Reception ==
The Monthly Film Bulletin wrote: "A film version of the successful play which defeats criticism by being continuously funny. It is photographed almost entirely from the front, as if it were a mere stage edition. The plot is complicated but thin, but the Lupino-Cliff partnership work so hard and the jokes are so many that the only regret is that laughter drowns half of them. ... The acting is good, though some of the women, notably Claire Luce, have too little to do. But as a piece of infectious nonsense it will succeed in the cinema as it did in the theatre."

Kine Weekly wrote: "Rollocking farcical comedy with music slickly adapted from the West End stage success. The story, tightly packed with bright situations and gags, is put over with gay bravado by a cast-iron male team, headed by Stanley Lupino and amplified to top line proportions by first-rate technical qualities. Laughs accumulate with snowball-like rapidity, and culminating in a great and glorious grand finale. The entertainment is a gift of the gods."
