= This'll Make You Whistle =

- Directed by: Herbert Wilcox
- Written by: Guy Bolton; Fred Thompson (as Frederick A. Thompson)
- Produced by: Herbert Wilcox
- Starring: Jack Buchanan
- Cinematography: Freddie Young
- Edited by: Frederick Wilson
- Music by: George Windeatt
- Production company: Herbert Wilcox Productions
- Distributed by: General Film Distributors (UK)
- Release date: 1 November 1936 (UK)
- Running time: 79 minutes
- Country: United Kingdom
- Language: English

This'll Make You Whistle is a 1936 British musical comedy film directed by Herbert Wilcox and starring Jack Buchanan, Elsie Randolph and William Kendall. It was written by Guy Bolton and Fred Thompson (as Frederick A. Thompson) based on the 1935 stage musical of the same title in which Buchanan starred.

== Synopsis ==
A man-about-town accidentally finds himself engaged to two women at the same time, the horse-mad Laura and the sweet-natured Joan who is dominated by her disapproving mother. His attempts to convince the guardian of the former that he is completely unsuited to marriage, while trying to persuade the mother of the latter that he is, are further complicated by the behaviour of his two friends and the appearance of an attractive life model named Bobbie Rivers. Further confusion ensues when the action shifts from London to the French resort of Le Touquet.

== Cast ==
- Jack Buchanan as Bill Hoppings
- Elsie Randolph as Bobbie Rivers
- Jean Gillie as Joan Longhurst
- William Kendall as Reggie Benson
- David Hutcheson as Archie Codrington
- Maidie Hope as Mrs Longhurst
- Anthony Holles as Sebastian Venables
- Marjorie Brooks as Laura Buxton
- Bunty Payne as Betty
- Miki Hood as Clarice
- Scott Harrold as Gendarme
- Irene Vere as Mrs Crimp
- Frederick Burtwell as hotel manager

== Stage production ==
The musical was first performed on stage at Southsea in December 1935, before a long run at the Palace Theatre and then Daly's in London's West End. The cast included Jack Buchanan as Bill Hoppings, Jean Gillie as Joan Longhurst, Sylvia Leslie as Laura Buxton, Maidie Hope as Mrs Longhurst, Elsie Randolph as Bobbie Rivers, Diana Lonsdale as Betty, Irene Vere as Mrs Crimp, Jill Ricarde as Clarice, and Eunice Crowther as Dora.

In Australia, the show was known as The Melody of London.

== Critical reception ==
The Monthly Film Bulletin wrote: "A most successful film version of the play. The story is as flimsy as most musicals. ...The ingredients are well mixed – songs, dances, humour, and spectacle. There is a clever use of open air shots-the gymkhana, the canoe on the river, the swimming pool and the sunshine pervades the whole piece. Jack Buchanan makes a charmingly foolish Bill and he is aided by every member of his cast. William Kendall and David Hutcheson are particularly good as his cronies."

Kine Weekly wrote: "Cheery, irresponsible light musical entertainmeat, smoothly adapted from the West End stage success. The actual plot can claim no marks for originality, but it nevertheless gives Jack Buchanan the chance of a lifetime, and he seizes it in a manner that makes the entertainment's success a foregone conclusion."

The New York Times wrote, "It isn't enough that Mars is attacking; England has just exploded a hot-air bomb in the immediate vicinity of the Fifty-fifth Street Playhouse. "This'll Make You Whistle" was the tag on it. We're whistling all right—one of those barely audible sounds made by pursing the lips and exhaling. Herbert Wilcox, who should have known better, launched the projectile, first charging it with people like Jack Buchanan, Elsie Randolph and Antony Holles and detonating it with a slow-burning musical comedy plot about a man with one fiancée too many. Typical line: "You're the bigamist fool in London." Typical scene: Mr. Buchanan and a pal, disguised as bearded gendarmes, being chased by twenty bearded gendarmes. Typical reaction: Ouch!"
