= Burning Sands (1922 film) =

1922 film by George Melford

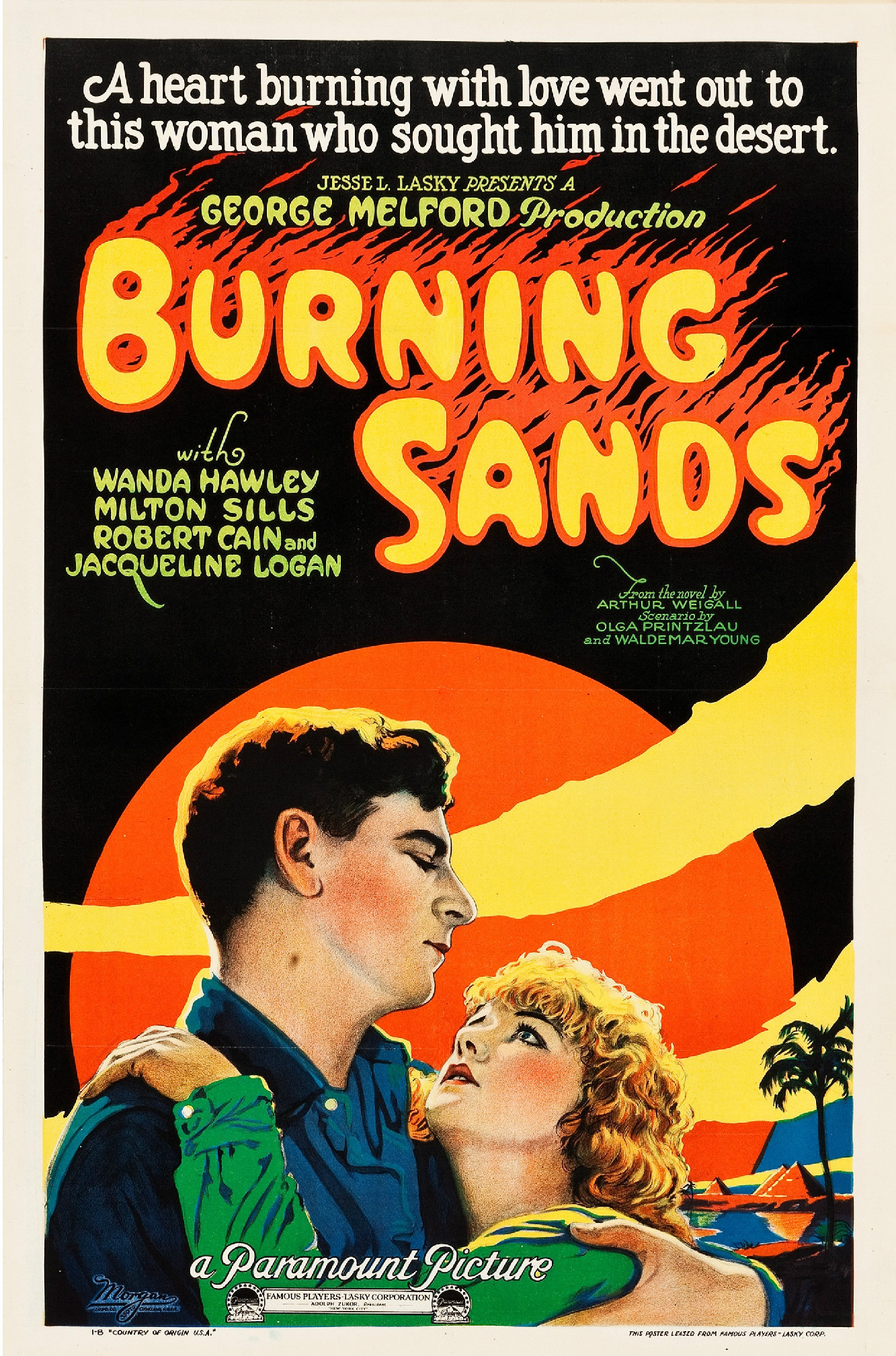
- Poster
- Directed by: George Melford
- Screenplay by: Olga Printzlau; Waldemar Young
- Based on: Burning Sands by Arthur Weigall
- Produced by: Jesse L. Lasky
- Starring: Wanda Hawley; Milton Sills; Louise Dresser; Jacqueline Logan
- Cinematography: Bert Glennon
- Production company: Famous Players–Lasky Corporation
- Distributed by: Paramount Pictures
- Release date: September 3, 1922
- Running time: 70 minutes
- Country: United States
- Language: Silent (English intertitles)

Burning Sands is a 1922 American silent drama film directed by George Melford and written by Olga Printzlau and Waldemar Young based upon the novel of the same name by Arthur Weigall. The film stars Wanda Hawley, Milton Sills, Louise Dresser, Jacqueline Logan, Robert Cain, Fenwick Oliver, and Winter Hall. The film was released on September 3, 1922, by Paramount Pictures.

Paramount hoped the production would enjoy the same success to the similarly themed hit The Sheik produced by the studio the previous year.

== Plot ==
As described in a film magazine review, a kindly old sheik is being deceived by his villainous son, who seeks to destroy his father by uniting with the enemy tribe. However, the plan is foiled by a young English philosopher who lives alone at the oasis. In the ensuing battle the villain is killed, leaving the way clear for the happy marriage of the philosopher and the young woman he loves.

== Cast ==
- Wanda Hawley as Muriel Blair
- Milton Sills as Daniel Lane
- Louise Dresser as Kate Bindane
- Jacqueline Logan as Lizette
- Robert Cain as Robert Barthampton
- Fenwick Oliver as Mr. Bindane
- Winter Hall as Governor
- Harris Gordon as Secretary
- Alan Roscoe as Ibrihim
- Cecil Holland as Old Sheik
- Joe Ray as Hussein

== Preservation ==
With no prints of Burning Sands located in any film archives, it is considered a lost film. In February 2021, the film was cited by the National Film Preservation Board on their Lost U.S. Silent Feature Films list.

== Bibliography ==
- Michelakis, Pantelis & Wyke, Maria. The Ancient World in Silent Cinema. Cambridge University Press, 2013. ISBN 978-1-107-01610-1
