= Laddie Cliff =

British actor (1891–1937)

- in Over She Goes (1937)
- Born: Clifford Albyn Perry; 3 September 1891; Bristol, England
- Died: 8 December 1937 (aged 46); Crans-Montana, Switzerland
- Occupations: Actor; writer; singer
- Years active: 1922–1937 (film)

Laddie Cliff (born Clifford Albyn Perry; 3 September 1891 – 8 December 1937) was a British dancer, choreographer, actor, producer, writer, and director of comedy, musical theatre and film. He was noted for his versatility. His many London West End theatre appearances and films included a long association with fellow thespian Stanley Lupino. He was married to the actress Phyllis Monkman. He died in 1937 after a period of ill health.

== Birth and launch of career ==
Born Clifford Albyn Perry on 3 September 1891 in Bristol, Laddie Cliff first toured in British, Australian, and American variety.

== US Vaudeville work ==
=== 1907-8 ===
In his early career, Laddie Cliff toured the US extensively in vaudeville, much of it on the Orpheum circuit. He made his debut at New York's Colonial Theatre on 30 December 1907. A review in the New York Dramatic Mirror of his 2 January performance praised his talent and anticipated his popularity:

he was suffering from hoarseness and had to cut out some of his songs. He did enough, however, to prove that he is an exceptionally clever youngster. He managed to talk and act two comic songs in a distinctly pleasing way, and as for his dancing, it completely brought down the house. He has a terpsichorean method entirely original, and almost every eccentric move he made brought a hearty laugh . . . he is certain to find plenty of appreciation in America.

On the 5th, the New York Daily Tribune reported that, at the Alhambra, "Laddie Cliff, the English boy performer, who was cordially received at the Colonial last week, will be on the bill. He has a pleasing voice and he dances well."

=== 1909-1910 ===
On 30 Jan 1909, the Montreal Gazette anticipated Laddie Cliff's "clever offering": "This little fellow is accounted one of the best English eccentric dancers of the stage." The Harvard Crimson reported that "Laddie Cliff, English boy dancing comedian" would entertain Harvard's 1910 "pop night" on 8 March in the Living Room of the Union. In early June he headlined at the Orpheum in Spokane, Washington and was reviewed as superior, original and appealing:

As a monologist, Laddie Cliff . . . is above the standard of the one-man act. He presents something original in his dancing and does not tire the audience with a long string of talk. The parting of lovers at the seaside pleases the listener."

From 14-20 June he was headlining at the Orpheum in Portland, Oregon, and appreciated as "a comedian of no small ability. He sang and danced well." In Gerald Vizenor's historical novel, Blue Ravens, set in Minneapolis, Cliff appears on the Orpheum Theatre programme as "Master Laddie Cliff . . . England's famous little Comedian and Grotesque Dancer". A review in San Francisco Call on 28 June 1909 hails him as a 17-year-old with "eloquent legs", identifying him as "the star of the show", whose "terpsichorean art wins much applause from Play Goers" His skill and individuality were highlighted:

Master Laddie Cliff won the honors....His songs and his dances are hot from the pavements of London. I should say, and he told us . . . that when he went back to England he'd tell the King [George V] about the reception he got. He is grotesque as a dancer, unusual as a singer and quite inimitable in all ways.

Laddie Cliff was named by Martin Beck in the San Francisco Call of 11 September 1909 as one of the "stars which will twinkle over the Orpheum Circuit", specially scouted in Europe for the 1910-11 season. In May 1910 he was exhausted enough to need a break back in England, as Variety reports from Chicago on 4 May: "Laddie Cliff will sail for his English home to obtain a rest, following the boy's appearance on the opening bill of Dave Robinson's Brighton Theatre, week May 16."

=== 1911-1913 - stardom ===
By 1911, Laddie Cliff was well established. His return to F.F. Proctor's Fifth Avenue Theatre was keenly anticipated:

Laddie Cliff is back, with the springs in his legs still in tip-top order. Laddie always gets a big welcome here, for he has played this house so often that his patrons have come to know him well. He has songs that are up to the minute, and a characteristic manner of delivering them that is more than half the battle. But his dancing is the real thing.

In 1913, he is one of the artists mentioned in the Player's section "Big Time Vaudeville Around New York". He is in a "particularly pleasing bill" at the Victoria theatre and "scoring his usual success".

== First marriage, property in US, and leaving the US to enlist - 1913-1916 ==
By around 1913 Cliff had become rich enough to buy property in New York State, and a couple of years later he married a fellow vaudeville dancer, Maybelle (also spelled Mabel and Maybell) Parker.

The marriage probably took place in the summer of 1915. During mid-September 1915, they performed together at New York's Palace Theatre. On Saturday 11th they were flagged among "Stage and Screen Players to Be Seen Next Week" in The Evening World as "Laddie Cliff...comedian, assisted by Maybelle Parker". The next week, on Tuesday 14 September, The Sun reports them starring as "Mr and Mrs Laddie Cliff". The New York Clipper reviewed them on Saturday 18th:

LADDIE CLIFF, assisted by MAYBELLE PARKER, captured the hit of the first portion of the program. Laddie's excellent dancing and his rendition of several exclusive songs, and the piano playing of Miss Parker puts this act in a class by itself.

In 1916 he decided to leave the US to return to England and enlist:

Laddie Cliff, the English comedian, has announced that he is going back to his native land to enlist. Cliff, who came to this country as a boy comedian seven or eight years ago, has been a great favorite here and, in fact, is much better known in America than be is in England. He is the owner of various pieces of American property and his bride of about a year, Maybell Parker, is an American girl. His friends have known, however, that he has felt very keenly the criticisms in some professional quarters regarding the number of English actors in this country, and although his associates explained that the criticisms were not directed against Englishmen who had become as Americanized as he, the young comedian felt that the best way to prove his love for his mother country was to fight for it.

Cliff had bought a farm on North Plank Road in Port Jervis, N.Y., and the announcement on 29 September, 1916, that it had been sold was carried in The New York Clipper of the same day:

LADDIE CLIFF SELLS FARM
Port Jervis, N.Y., Sept 29. — Announcement was made today of the sale of the farm of Laddie Cliff, vaudeville Star, who is shortly to sail for England to join the British army aviation corps. It was purchased by Dr. William E. Barth, of Newburgh.

Laddie Cliff is really Clifford Albyn Cliff [sic], but he has always been called Laddie and assumed this name on the stage. About three years ago he purchased a place on the North Plank road, about three miles from the city, and has spent considerable time there.

The marriage to Maybelle Parker did not last; they divorced in 1925 and she lived in England until 1941.

== First successes as a performer in London, 1920-1921 ==
Cliff's acclaimed "extraordinary dancing" as a bespectacled comic in the London musical Three Little Widows resulted in his being engaged to choreograph André Charlot's The Wild Geese and put him on the road to stardom. He subsequently appeared in the revue Pins and Needles (1921).

As a performer, Cliff was the first to sing "Swanee" on the London stage, in Albert de Courville's London Hippodrome revue Jig-Saw! (1920). The cast included Stanley Lupino and the Dolly Sisters. Cliff is pictured on the original sheet music of the song.

== Second marriage ==
From 1921, Laddie Cliff collaborated with Phyllis Monkman on The Co-Optimists(Royalty Theatre and Palace Theatre, 1921). They were married on Tuesday,16 February 1926 at the Savoy Chapel.

== Development of theatrical career 1921-1936 ==
Cliff subsequently became an acclaimed producer and director of several West End shows. He choreographed George Gershwin's Primrose at the Winter Garden Theatre in 1924, working alongside George Grossmith who co-wrote the book, produced and staged the show.

Continuing as one of the most popular performers on the London stage, his other West End hits included

- The Co-Optimists (Royalty Theatre and Palace Theatre, 1921)
- Dear Little Billie (Shaftsbury Theatre, 1925)
- Tip-Toes (Winter Garden Theatre, 1926) - the London production of the Gershwin musical.
- Lady Luck (Carlton Theatre, 1927)
- So This Is Love (Winter Garden Theatre, 1928)
- Love Lies (Gaiety Theatre, 1929)
- The Millionaire Kid (New Wimbledon Theatre and Gaiety Theatre, 1931)
- Sporting Love (Winter Garden Theatre, 1934)
- Over She Goes (Saville Theatre, 1936) (a role he recreated in the 1937 film version)

=== Burglary at London residence, 1928 ===
On 22 November 1928, Australia's Western Mail reported a burglary at the London home of Laddie Cliff and his wife Phyllis Monkman. Cliff was onstage in So This Is Love at the time, and the burglary was discovered by Monkman. The event inspired a song.

BURGLARY INSPIRES SONG
Thieves who broke into the St John's Wood (London) home of Mr. Laddie Cliff, who is playing in "So This Is Love" at the Winter Garden Theatre, inspired a new song for one of the actor's productions.
It is entitled "Don't leave your jemmy on the door," for that is what the thieves did.
Mr Cliff was at the theatre, and the burglary was discovered by Miss Phyllis Monkman, his wife, who found the door splintered opened and a jemmy nearby.
The thieves had ransacked the house and stolen a gold cigarette case inscribed from "David to Laddie," a blue enamelled dress watch inscribed "To Laddie from his Friar friends: Aug, 4, 1916," and other property, including a fur coat.

== Illness, death, and memorial ==
Cliff had to leave the cast of Crazy Days at the Shaftesbury Theatre in September 1937, owing to illness and was replaced by Leo Franklyn. He travelled to Switzerland in October, and was admitted to the British Sanatorium in Crans-Montana suffering from pleurisy and pneumonia, where he died on 8 December, aged 46, with his wife Phyllis Monkman by his side. A funeral service was held in Lausanne on 10 December, where his remains were cremated before being returned to London for burial three days later.

== Selected filmography ==
- The Card (1922)
- The Co-Optimists (1929)
- Sleeping Car (1933)
- Happy (1933)
- Over She Goes (1937)
- Sporting Love (1937)

== General ==
- Edinburgh Evening News, "Swiss Funeral Service for Laddie Cliff", 9 December 1937, Page 9
- Newmarket Journal, "Death of Laddie Cliff", 11 December 1937, Page 9

== Bibliography ==
- Kurt Gänzl. The Encyclopedia of the Musical Theatre: A-Gi. Schirmer Books, 2001.
