= Burning Sands (novel) =

1921 novel

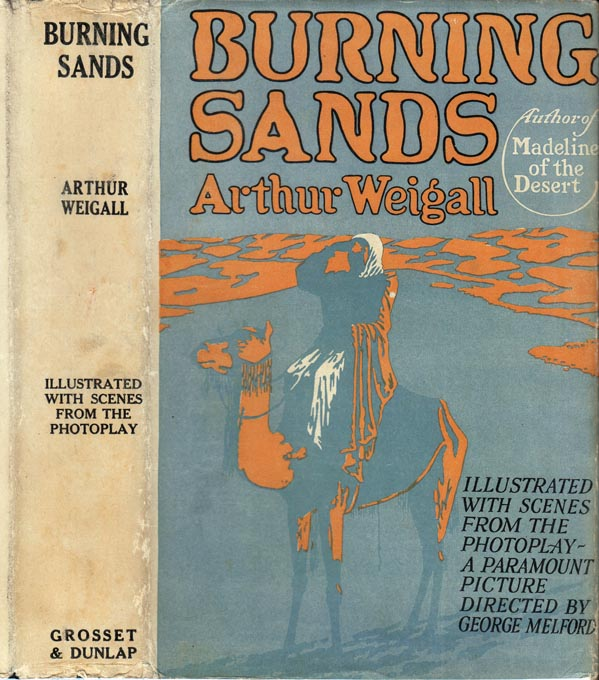
- First Edition (US)
- Author: Arthur Weigall
- Language: English
- Genre: Drama
- Publisher: T. Fisher Unwin (UK); Grosset & Dunlap (US)
- Publication date: 1921
- Publication place: United Kingdom
- Media type: Print

Burning Sands is a 1921 dramatic adventure novel by the British writer Arthur Weigall. It was originally published in Britain under the alternative title The Dweller in the Desert. Set in the Middle East, the novel was a riposte to the 1919 novel The Sheik by E. M. Hull.

== Film adaptation ==
In 1922 it was adapted into an American silent film Burning Sands directed by George Melford and starring Wanda Hawley, Milton Sills and Jacqueline Logan. It was produced by Paramount Pictures who were hoping to capitalise on the enormous success of the previous year's film version of The Sheik.

== Bibliography ==
- Goble, Alan. The Complete Index to Literary Sources in Film. Walter de Gruyter, 1999.
- Trotter, David. English Novel in History, 1895–1920. Routledge, 2003.
- Michelakis, Pantelis & Wyke, Maria. The Ancient World in Silent Cinema. Cambridge University Press, 2013.
