= Helen Trix =

American actress (1886–1951)

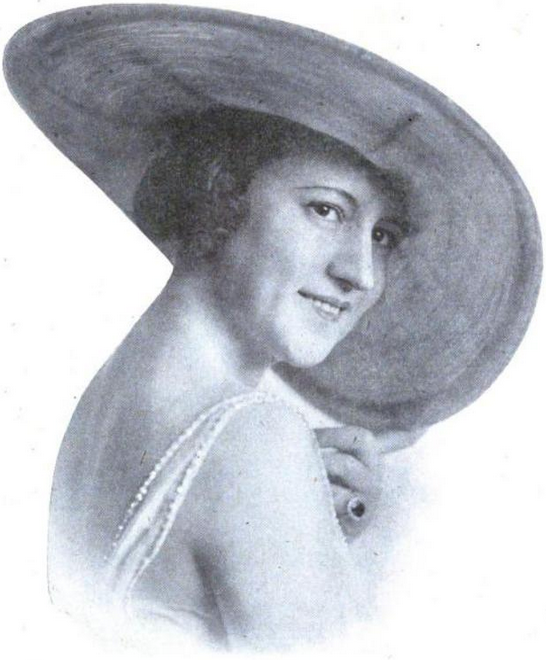
- Helen Trix, from sheet music published in 1918
- Born: 1886
- Died: November 19, 1951 (aged 64–65)
- Occupation: Actress

Helen Trix (1886 – November 19, 1951) was an American dancer, singer, and song composer. The August 1906 edition of Edison Phonograph Monthly describes her as having a "clear, well modulated contralto voice".

== Early years ==
Trix and six siblings grew up on a farm in Pennsylvania. In 1919, her sister Josephine joined her in performing in vaudeville, "a dancer and singer fresh from a convent."

== Vaudeville and stage entertainer ==
The Trix sisters performed songs written by Helen, who also provided accompaniment. By August 1926, Helen had begun performing with another sister, Mattie, in a duo that "scored immensely in the London Music Halls for several seasons". After Helen Trix left the original act. Helen Lewis, from Liverpool, England, replaced her, performing with Josephine as the Trix Sisters. In April 1935, Lewis left the act and Josephine sought another "Helen Trix".

During World War I, Trix took part in a gala performance which combined vaudeville performers with members of Company A of the Seventy-First Regiment, U.S. Army. Will Rogers and twelve Ziegfeld Follies dancers also appeared in the entertainment event staged at the Liberty Theater in New York City.

She was a regular performer on the Keith-Albee-Orpheum vaudeville circuit for many years. Her first North American tour was in 1913. Her sisters, Josephine and Mattie, sometimes accompanied her on stage. She was sometimes called the "Piano songwhistleress".

She made her debut in England in 1909. Trix performed in the London revue, The League of Nations, in 1920. She appeared in the English capitol, in Tricks, in 1925–1926. She remained abroad for more than four years. Trix also did shows in Australia, South Africa and the primary cities in Europe. In 1926 she was featured in the International Revue produced by George Jessel.

== Songs and radio ==
Trix composed such songs as "Follow Me", "You'd Love To Live In Paris", "London Town", and "Beautiful Shangri-La". She performed songs on WGBS, on a regular radio program. The show aired from 8:00–8:15 pm in 1930. The recital was listed as Helen Trix diseuse.

== Personal life and death ==
Trix lived at the Stratford Hotel, on East Thirty-Second Street. On November 18, 1951, she died at St. Elizabeth's Hospital in New York City, aged 64.
