= Phyllis Monkman =

British actress (1892–1976)

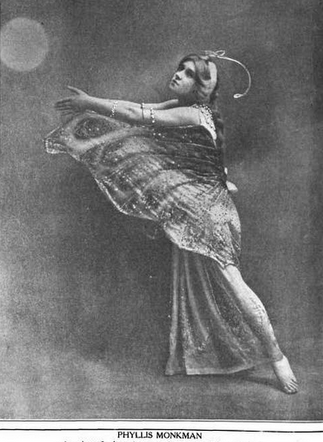
- Phyllis Monkman as a teenager, in a butterfly dance costume, from 1908 publication.
- Born: Phyllis Ida Harrison; 8 January 1892; London, United Kingdom
- Died: 2 December 1976 (aged 84); London, United Kingdom
- Occupation: Actress
- Years active: 1913–1949

Phyllis Monkman (née Phyllis Ida Harrison; 8 January 1892 – 2 December 1976) was a British stage and film actress. She was married to the entertainer Laddie Cliff.

In the early years of her career, she was often partnered on stage by Jack Buchanan and appeared in the silent film Her Heritage with him in 1919. She was also prominent in the cast of the revue The Co-Optimists and reprised her role in the film adaptation. After this point she was increasingly confined to supporting character parts. She appeared in Alfred Hitchcock's 1929 thriller Blackmail, widely considered the first British "talkie". She was romantically linked to George VI.

== Selected filmography ==
- Her Heritage (1919)
- Blackmail (1929)
- The Co-Optimists (1929)
- The King of Paris (1934)
- Young Man's Fancy (1939)
- The Good Old Days (1940)
- Carnival (1946)
- Diamond City (1949)

== Bibliography ==
- James Ross Moore. Andre Charlot: The Genius of Intimate Musical Revue. McFarland, 2005.
