= Melville Gideon =

British musician (1884–1933)

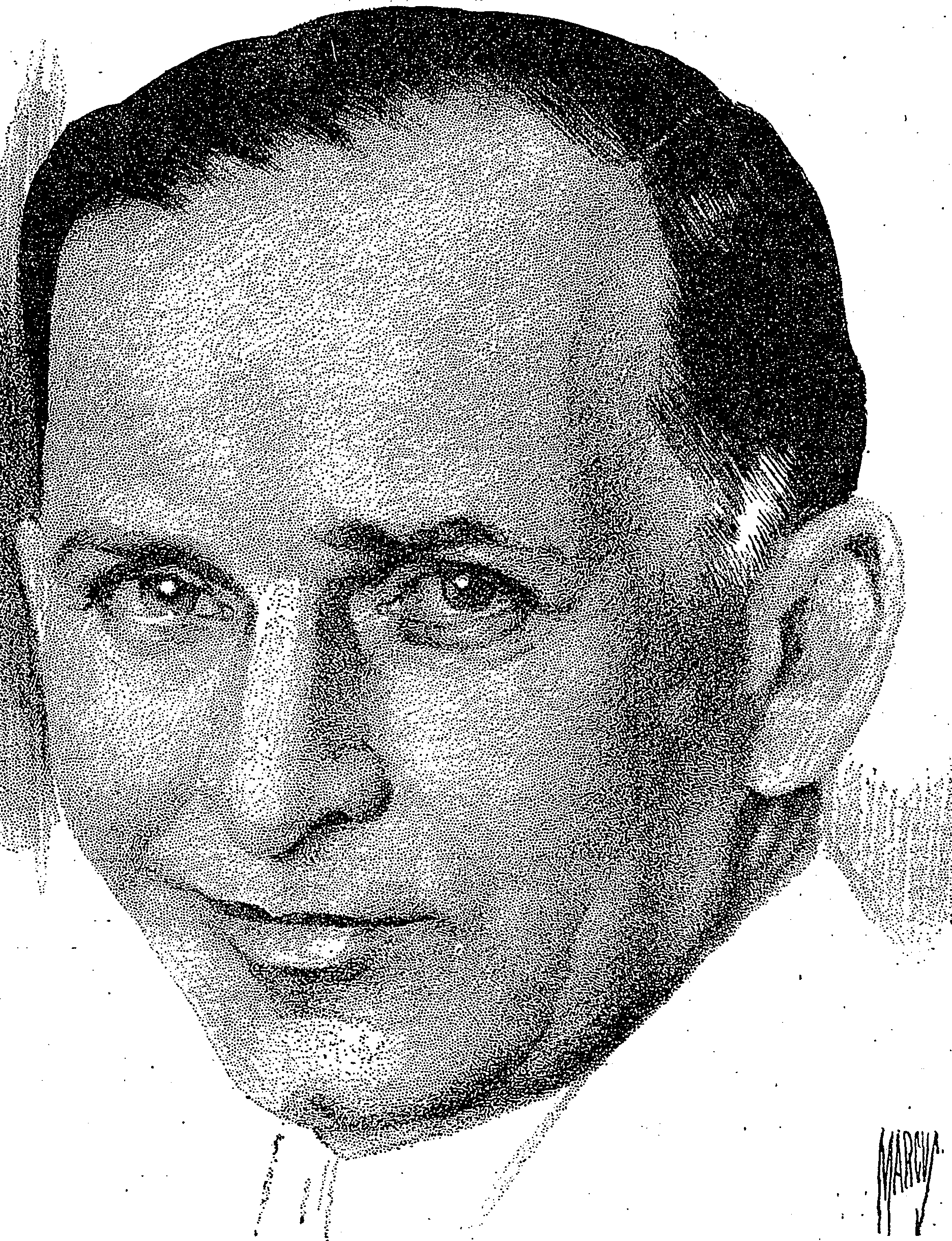
Image of Melville Gideon

Melville J. Gideon (May 21, 1884 – November 11, 1933) was an American composer, lyricist and performer of ragtime music, composing many themes for hit Broadway musicals including The Co-Optimists and The Beauty Spot. He was also a director, producer and performer. He was born in New York City, and died in London, aged 49.

Among the songs he composed were "Arizona" (1916, lyrics by James Heard), "Washington Square" (1920, lyrics by Cole Porter and Ray E. Goetz), "I Never Realized" (1921, lyrics by Porter) and "Crinoline Gown" (1924, lyrics by Clifford Seyler).
