= Jack Buchanan =

Scottish actor, singer, director and producer (1890–1957)

- Buchanan in the 1929 film Paris
- Born: Walter John Buchanan; 2 April 1890; Helensburgh, Dunbartonshire, Scotland
- Died: 20 October 1957 (aged 67); London, England
- Occupations: Actor; dancer; director; producer; singer
- Years active: 1912–1957
- Spouses: Saffo Arnau (m. 1915; ann. 1920) Susan Bassett (m. 1947)

Walter John Buchanan (2 April 1890 – 20 October 1957) was a Scottish theatre and film actor, singer, dancer, producer and director.

Born to a comfortable middle-class family in Scotland, Buchanan attempted to follow his father into auctioneering, but conceived a strong desire to be a performer. After a calamitous début as a stand-up comic, he moved to London and between 1912 and 1917 built up a performing career in the chorus or small parts in musical comedies before achieving leading roles in West End shows and remaining at the top of his profession for the rest of his career.

He was known for more than three decades as the embodiment of the debonair man-about-town in the tradition of George Grossmith Jr., and was described by The Times as the last of the knuts. Among his leading ladies in West End, and, later, Broadway, shows were Binnie Hale, Gertrude Lawrence, Beatrice Lillie, Jessie Matthews, Phyllis Monkman and – the partner with whom he was most associated – Elsie Randolph.

Buchanan directed, choreographed, and produced many shows, and ran theatres and a film studio. He made several British films, often adaptations of his stage successes, but his best-known film was the Hollywood musical The Band Wagon in 1953.

== Life and career ==
=== Early years ===
Buchanan was born on 2 April 1890 in Helensburgh, near Glasgow, the son of Walter John Buchanan, a prosperous auctioneer, and his wife, Patricia née McWatt. He was intended for Edinburgh's leading private school, Fettes College, but his father's sudden death in 1902 left the family in reduced circumstances, and he was educated at a state school, the Glasgow Academy.

After a brief attempt to follow his father's profession once he left school, he appeared as a music hall comedian under the name of Chump Buchanan, making a disastrous début in 1911: he later recalled that he must have set "a world record in getting the bird" twenty-four times in his first week. After that he decided to pursue a career in London.

Buchanan made his West End début on 7 September 1912 at the Apollo Theatre, as M. Deschamps, the French dancing master, in a comic opera, The Grass Widows. He was billed in advance as "Mr W. Buchanan", but by the first night he had opted to appear as Jack Buchanan. His role was a minor one, but he attracted mild praise from the theatrical papers The Era and The Stage. The piece ran for only six weeks, after which Buchanan had only one brief engagement until April 1913, when he joined the chorus of a new revue, All the Winners at the Empire, Leicester Square as understudy to two of the principals. During this time he supplemented his income working as an extra in silent films. When the show closed after two months he was out of work for several months before securing a dancing role in a pantomime in Birmingham and then a principal part in a West End revue, A Mixed Grill, which opened in March 1914.

George Grossmith, Jr as Dudley Mitton, with Julia James in To-Night's the Night. Grossmith cast Buchanan as Mitton for a British tour.

Buchanan's health was not robust, and when he attempted to enlist for military service at the start of the First World War he failed his medical examination. He joined a touring production of The Cinema Star understudying Jack Hulbert and then auditioned for the actor-manager George Grossmith, Jr, who cast him in the leading role in a touring production of the highly successful musical comedy, To-Night's the Night. Grossmith himself had played the part on Broadway and in London, and gave Buchanan helpful advice about performing. (Note: The theatre historian W. J. Macqueen-Pope called Buchanan "the legitimate successor to George Grossmith", who, like Buchanan, was tall and slim, performing "with distinction, ease and elegance". To Macqueen-Pope, Buchanan was Grossmith's more modern counterpart.) The tour was successful and lasted for two years. A reviewer commented, "As Dudley Mitton, Mr Jack Buchanan plays with confidence and enthusiasm that is infectious, and his share in the popular 'They didn't believe me!' was valuable indeed, and the grimmer humour of 'Murders' was well handled".

In 1915 Buchanan married Saffo Arnau, a singer professionally known as Drageva. It may have been a marriage of convenience for her benefit: she was a Bulgarian national and therefore liable to internment as an enemy alien during the war if she did not acquire a British husband. She vanished from Buchanan's life while they were both on separate British tours and the marriage was annulled in 1920. Buchanan did not allude to this brief marriage later, preferring to maintain his public image as an eligible bachelor.

=== West End star ===
Buchanan with Phyllis Monkman in Tails Up (1918)

With the Trix Sisters in A to Z (1921)

Disguised as a barmaid in Boodle (1924), with Elsie Randolph

"The Fox Has Left His Lair" (1926)

In That's a Good Girl (1928)

Buchanan's first starring role in the West End was in André Charlot's revue Bubbly in 1917. Hulbert had been the leading man for the first few weeks of the run but was about to be conscripted into the army. The leading lady of the show, Phyllis Monkman, and her actress sister suggested Buchanan as replacement, and he co-starred with Monkman in Bubbly and Charlot's next revue, Tails Up (1918), in between which he appeared with Violet Lorraine, Nelson Keys and Alfred Lester in Round the Map, an American revue rewritten for British audiences.

In Charlot's 1921 revue A to Z, Buchanan achieved front rank stardom. The theatre historian W. J. Macqueen-Pope writes that the show's title was appropriate:

indeed, it contained almost everything, including the Trix Sisters, Gertrude Lawrence and Jack Buchanan. Most of the music was by Ivor Novello in his best light manner, and a song of his gave Jack Buchanan a great hit – "And Her Mother Came Too". It is still sung. (Note: Novello composed the music, but the words were by Dion Titheradge.)

For the rest of the 1920s and 1930s Buchanan was famous for, as The Times put it, "the seemingly lazy but most accomplished grace with which he sang, danced, flirted and joked his way through musical shows.... The tall figure, the elegant gestures, the friendly drawling voice, the general air of having a good time."

At the same time as establishing himself as a leading musical comedy star, Buchanan moved into management, which he pursued, with varying degrees of success, throughout the rest of his career. His first venture in that capacity was Battling Butler, which opened at the New Oxford Theatre in 1922. With music by Philip Braham and lyrics by Douglas Furber, it was billed as "a musical farce in three acts", and was co-directed by Dion Titheradge and Buchanan, who choreographed the dances. It ran for 243 performances in the West End, and then toured, with Arthur Riscoe taking over from Buchanan in the lead role. Buchanan followed this success with another musical farce, Toni, by Furber and Harry Graham (book and lyrics) and Hugo Hirsch (music), which opened in May 1924 and ran for 250 performances.

=== Broadway and West End, 1924–1939 ===
Charlot revised A to Z for the Broadway stage as André Charlot's Revue of 1924, which opened at the Times Square Theatre in January of that year. Buchanan co-starred with Lawrence and Beatrice Lillie, and according to his biographer Andrew Lister, the show introduced the American public to "the distinctive charms of the intimate revue" as opposed to the Ziegfeld spectaculars. (Note: Florenz Ziegfeld was famous for his Broadway revues featuring what one biographer describes as "large musical production numbers that featured numerous beautiful women in gorgeous costumes".) In December 1924 Buchanan played Lord Algernon Kenilworth in Boodle, in a pre-London try-out in Birmingham and then in the West End. In this piece, described by The Stage as "something more than a musical play ... in parts, really excellent farce", Buchanan's character was obliged to disguise himself as a clown and later as a barmaid: a reviewer in the Birmingham Daily Gazette commented, "Ah! if all barmaids were half as interesting, the whole country would take to drink". His leading lady in this production was June, but in a subsidiary role was Elsie Randolph, who became Buchanan's best-known stage partner in later productions. Despite good notices, the piece had a modest run of 94 performances.

Buchanan appeared in five British films made in 1924–25: The Audacious Mr Squire, The Happy Ending, Settled Out of Court, A Typical Budget and Bulldog Drummond's Third Round, and returning to stage revue he appeared, co-starring with Lawrence, in Charlot's 1925 production at the Prince of Wales's. He starred in, choreographed and directed an American production of the show at the Selwyn Theatre, New York. It included one of his most celebrated sketches, "The Fox Has Left His Lair", in which he portrayed a last-minute substitute to a male-voice quartet, who is frantically attempting to keep up with his fellow singers in a hunting song that gets faster and faster and ever more complicated. On his return to London he appeared at the Hippodrome in October 1926, when he produced Jerome Kern and Oscar Hammerstein's Sunny, which ran for 363 performances. Buchanan played Jim Demming, with Binnie Hale as Sunny and Elsie Randolph as Weenie Winters. He interpolated the hunting song sketch into the production. At the same theatre in June 1928, after a pre-London tour, he produced That's a Good Girl, in which he appeared as Bill Barrow with Randolph now in the leading female role. Their duet, "Fancy Our Meeting", was recorded by Columbia and became well known. In his 1978 biography of Buchanan, Michael Marshall comments, "this haunting tune is played and sung whenever Jack and Elsie's long partnership is recalled". In the words of Buchanan's biographer Andrew Spicer:

His throwaway nonchalance was complemented superbly by her spirited vivacity. Theirs was a world of light-hearted facetiousness played out in glamorous modern settings created by leading designers such as Ernst Stern. Buchanan rarely strayed from this milieu.

After this, Buchanan's West End and Broadway appearances were mainly in revue and musicals. In his entry in Who's Who he singled out That's a Good Girl (1928), Stand Up and Sing (1931), Mr Whittington (1933) and This'll Make You Whistle (1935) among his inter-war productions in the West End. In all these he was partnered by Randolph. He appeared on Broadway again in 1929 in C. B. Cochran's revue Wake Up and Dream, heading a cast that contained Tilly Losch and Jessie Matthews. "Fancy Our Meeting" was interpolated from There's a Good Girl, and as Buchanan and Matthews did not get on well, (Note: In the earlier London version of the show the male lead was Sonnie Hale with whom Matthews had an affair (causing something of a scandal) and whose supersession in the Broadway cast she resented.) this affectionate duet cost them both some effort. Buchanan starred in two early Hollywood talkies, Cole Porter's Paris (1929), with Irene Bordoni, and Monte Carlo (1930) directed by Ernst Lubitsch.

In 1932 Buchanan accepted an invitation to star in George and Ira Gershwin's Pardon My English in the US. When the production opened it was plain to audiences that he was uncomfortable in his dual role as an English aristocrat and a German gangster. At considerable personal expense he bought himself out of his contract and left the cast. The show closed soon afterwards and he did not return to Broadway for six years. His last Broadway show before the Second World War was Howard Dietz and Arthur Schwartz's Between the Devil (1938), with Evelyn Laye and Adele Dixon, in which he played an inadvertent bigamist.

Buchanan starred in several British films during the 1930s. Some were straightforward adaptations of his stage successes, including That's a Good Girl (1933) and This'll Make You Whistle (1936) for Herbert Wilcox's British and Dominions Imperial Studios. Goodnight Vienna (1932), in which he starred opposite Anna Neagle, was based on a BBC-commissioned radio operetta. The Times remarked on how hauntingly Buchanan sang George Posford's songs for the piece. Spicer comments that films more in keeping with Buchanan's image as "the affable playboy" were Brewster's Millions and Come Out of the Pantry (both 1935). The latter includes one of Buchanan's best-known songs, "Everything Stops for Tea".

=== Second World War ===
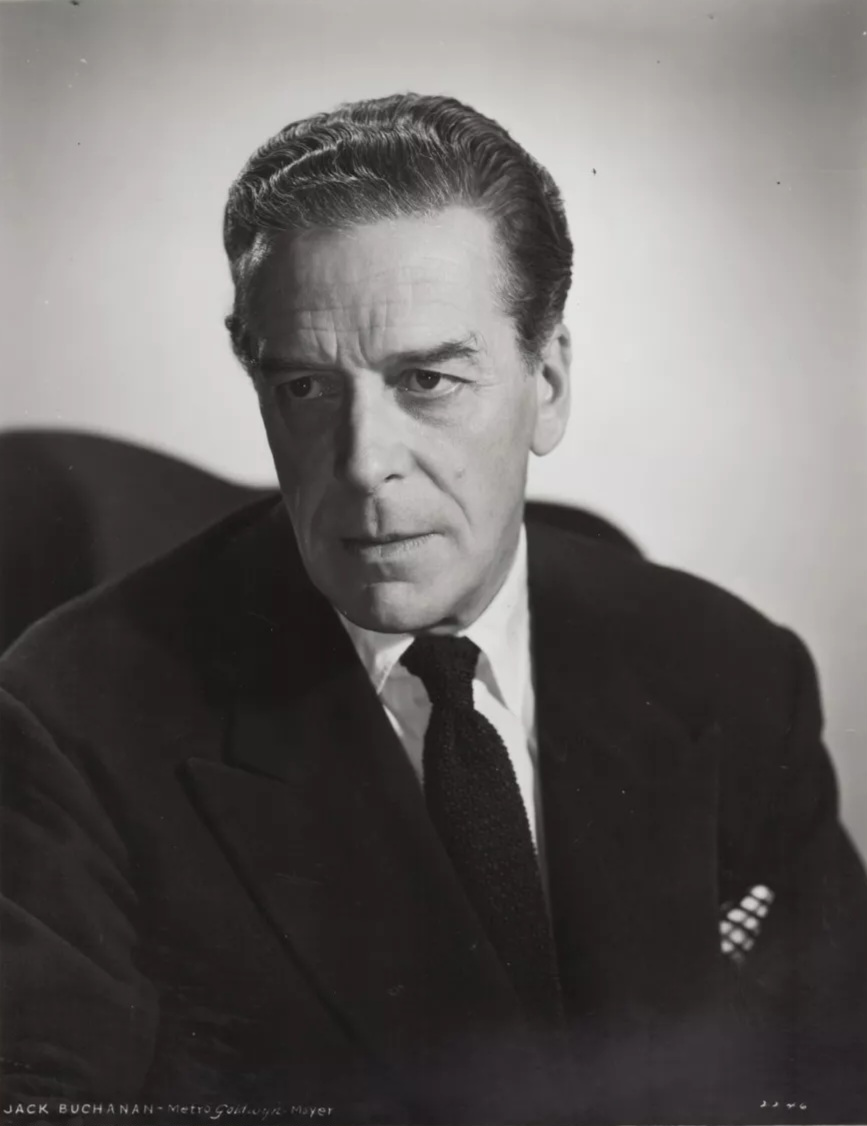
Buchanan c. 1940

In 1940 Buchanan presented a comedy-thriller, The Body Was Well Nourished, and the following year he and Randolph appeared in the piece on tour. At Christmas of that year he made his début as a principal in pantomime, playing Buttons in Cinderella. The Times said that he gave the part a new look that went down very well. At the Cambridge Theatre in September 1942, he produced but did not appear in Waltz Without End, a musical play by Eric Maschwitz, based on the life and music of Chopin which ran until early 1943. In 1943 he and Randolph co-starred in It's Time to Dance, a musical play, which he also produced.

In 1944 Buchanan presented, but did not act in, another thriller, A Murder for a Valentine. While that production was running, he played Lord Dilling in a revival of The Last of Mrs Cheyney at the Savoy Theatre, with Coral Browne in the title role and Athene Seyler and Margaret Scudamore in the supporting cast. Buchanan and Browne became romantically involved and some in the theatre world predicted that they would marry and become a West End equivalent of Broadway's Alfred Lunt and Lynn Fontanne. This production marked the first of Buchanan's wartime and post-war appearances as an actor in non-musical pieces. He was simultaneously pursuing business interests, adding the management of the King's Theatre, Hammersmith to that of film studios he had owned nearby since before the war, and he took over the Garrick Theatre, first jointly with Bernard Delfont and later as sole tenant.

=== Post-war ===
Buchanan's last West End revue was Fine Feathers, at the Prince of Wales Theatre in 1945. The critic Anthony Cookman wrote of "Mr Jack Buchanan, than whom no one could be glossier, weaving his ageless charm":

To see him at it, observing with what neat finality he has perfected the art of doing nothing in particular and of being the well-dressed man about town, is to be given a composite impression, as it were, of all the glittering revues he has led when he and we were a great deal younger.

The performers won more praise than the material from reviewers but the show ran from October 1945 to July 1946. The following year he again acted in a non-musical play: a revival of Frederick Lonsdale's 1929 comedy Canaries Sometimes Sing, co-starring with Coral Browne, in the roles originally played by Ronald Squire and Yvonne Arnaud. The Stage commented, "It is a delight to see such brilliantly polished acting", but the critical and public consensus was that the play was outdated and it had only a short run. During this period Buchanan was struggling with business commitments. In Marshall's words, "He was tied to his desk at the Garrick Theatre trying to recoup – through the sale of his film studios – substantial losses on the King's Theatre, Hammersmith and his television business". (Note: He jointly owned, with his schoolfriend John Logie Baird, Television Limited, a manufacturing and rental company, which though innovative was not commercially profitable.)

With Susan Bassett, whom he married in 1949

Buchanan returned to Broadway twice during 1948, first to play Elwood in Harvey – one of six actors who took the role during a run of more than four years – and again for the musical Don't Listen, Ladies, which was not a success, closing after fifteen performances. Despite predictions, Buchanan did not marry Coral Browne, although they remained close friends and continued to work together. In January 1949 he married a divorcée, Susan Bassett, whom he had met in the US two years earlier. The couple had no children, though Bassett had a daughter from her first marriage. (Note: Coral Browne married Buchanan's understudy, Philip Pearman, shortly afterwards, with the Buchanans in attendance.)

After playing alongside Browne in Castle in the Air, a non-musical comedy in late 1949, in 1951 Buchanan took over the leading role in Novello's King's Rhapsody after the author-star's sudden death. It is a musical comedy, but Novello, who did not sing, had as usual written a wholly spoken part for himself. The Stage commented:

Jack Buchanan had an unenviable task when he took over the late Ivor Novello's part of Nikki in King's Rhapsody last Monday. But he slipped into it with remarkable ease. Perhaps not as "romantic" as Mr Novello, he has an engaging matter-of-factness which covers an implied reserve of sentiment. Added to this, his polish, stage presence and pleasant and audible voice ensure that, when he feels himself completely inside the glove, this imposing musical play, with its remarkable freedom from mawkishncss and its touches of gently ironical humour, will continue strongly on its career.

=== The Band Wagon and last years ===
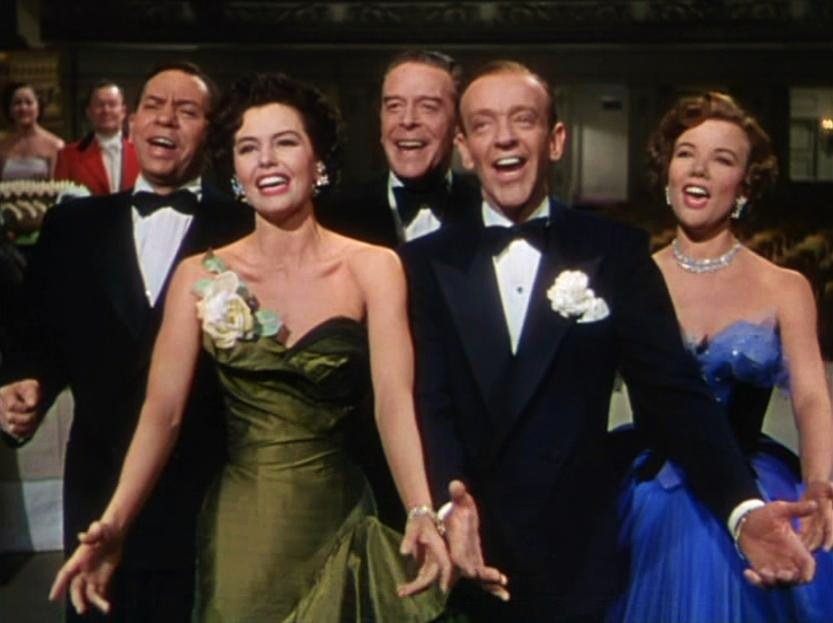
The Band Wagon (1953): from left: Oscar Levant, Cyd Charisse, Buchanan, Fred Astaire, Nanette Fabray

In 1953 Buchanan returned to Hollywood to appear in Vincente Minnelli's The Band Wagon. He played a highbrow actor-manager driven by financial necessity into more popular productions. His white-tie-and tails duet with Fred Astaire, "I Guess I'll Have to Change my Plan", shows, in Spicer's words, "the profound differences between American pep and English aristocratic nonchalance". The two performers admired each other greatly. Buchanan regarded Astaire as "the greatest dancer in the world today", and Astaire wrote, after Buchanan's death:

The Band Wagon confirmed what I had always suspected: that Jack – behind that seemingly casual style – worked as hard as I did to perfect his routines. ... "I Guess I'll Have to Change my Plan" is one of the fitting memorials to this great artist in which I was proud to share.

Buchanan's final stage appearances were in 1956, in a tour of major British cities in the comedy The French Mistress. He played the harassed headmaster of a boys' boarding school trying to cope with the consequences of the arrival of a new French teacher who turns out to be an extremely glamorous and alluring young Frenchwoman. An Edinburgh critic wrote, "Beneath his black scholastic gown, Jack Buchanan is still the debonair figure we remember so well, with, may it be said, admiration".

Buchanan died of spinal cancer, aged 67, in the Middlesex Hospital, London, on 20 October 1957. A private memorial service was held on board the Queen Mary, on which he, and latterly his wife, had frequently crossed the Atlantic. His ashes were scattered on Southampton Water. A memorial service followed on 25 October at St Columba's, the principal Church of Scotland church in London, attended by his widow and many members of the theatrical profession, including Elsie Randolph, Laurence Olivier, Tom Arnold, Clive Brook, Cicely Courtneidge, Zena Dare, Leslie Henson, Evelyn Laye, Anna Neagle, Naunton Wayne and Elisabeth Welch.

== Reputation ==
Privately, Buchanan was known for his probity, generosity, and loyalty, and he was much loved in the theatrical world. Professionally, he was regarded as the personification of West End theatre. Macqueen-Pope describes "West End" as embodying "gloss and polish ... assurance and sophistication ... ease and lack of self-consciousness" and comments that Buchanan was the last exponent of West End glamour: "He left no successor as the personification of the West End he represented, for that West End had passed, too". In its obituary, The Times called Buchanan "the last of the knuts" – a term dating from the early years of the twentieth century, signifying a young man who is stylish and fashionable, although sometimes (not always) somewhat lacking in brains. Like his predecessor George Grossmith, Buchanan could play both romantic leads and "silly ass" parts, and they both embodied the urbane, fashionably elegant man-about-town.

Spicer sums up his biographical sketch of Buchanan:

On stage or screen his tall, slim figure was always immaculately clothed ... His limber dancing, apparently casual and spontaneous, was complemented by a slightly husky light tenor voice considered both pleasant and alluring. His whole style was especially notable for a relaxed, affable grace and charm which gave him tremendous sex appeal, but he was also admired by men who envied and hoped to emulate his insouciant savoir faire. It was a particularly British form of male display: understated, apparently effortless, the quintessence of "good form" that refused to take itself too seriously.

== Recordings and films ==
=== Recordings ===
Buchanan was a prolific recording artist. An appendix to Marshall's biography lists nearly fifty recordings by him in songs and sketches, including some of his best-known, such as "And Her Mother Came Too", "A Cup of Coffee, a Sandwich and You" (with Gertrude Lawrence), "Fancy Our Meeting", "There's Always Tomorrow", "This'll Make You Whistle" (all with Elsie Randolph), "Goodnight Vienna", "Everything Stops for Tea", and, from The Band Wagon, "Triplets" (with Fred Astaire and Nannette Fabray) and "I Guess I'll Have to Change My Plan" (with Astaire).

=== Films ===
Buchanan's characters in his early, silent films were in contrast with his stage persona: he appeared in dramatic roles in crime films such as Auld Lang Syne (1917) and Her Heritage (1919), starred as the hero in Bulldog Drummond’s Third Round (1925), and took the detective role in Toni (1928), his last silent film, heavily adapted from the 1924 stage musical of that name, in which he had starred. For some of his later films he participated off screen as well as on, co-directing Yes, Mr Brown, adapting and co-directing That's a Good Girl, co-directing The Sky's the Limit and co-producing The Gang's All Here. Marshall's biography of Buchanan lists the following films:

- Auld Lang Syne (1917)
- Her Heritage (1919)
- The Audacious Mr. Squire (1923)
- The Happy Ending (1925)
- Settled Out of Court (1925)
- Bulldog Drummond's Third Round (1925)
- A Typical Budget (1925, Short)
- Confetti (1928)
- Toni (1928)
- Paris (1929)
- Monte Carlo (1930)
- A Man of Mayfair (1931)
- Goodnight, Vienna (1932)
- Yes, Mr Brown (1933)
- That's a Good Girl (1933)
- Brewster's Millions (1935)
- Come Out of the Pantry (1935)
- When Knights Were Bold (1936)
- This'll Make You Whistle (1936)
- Smash and Grab (1937)
- Limelight (1937)
- Break the News (1938)
- Sweet Devil (1938)
- The Sky's the Limit (1938)
- The Gang's All Here (1939)
- The Middle Watch (1940)
- Bulldog Sees It Through (1940)
- The Band Wagon (1953)
- As Long as They're Happy (1955)
- Josephine and Men (1955)
- The French, They Are a Funny Race (1955)

== Notes, references and sources ==
=== Sources ===
- Astaire, Fred (1978). "Foreword". Top Hat & Tails: The Story of Jack Buchanan. London: Elm Tree Books. ISBN 0-24-189602-9.
- Burton, Alan; Steve Chibnall (2013). Historical Dictionary of British Cinema. Lanham: Scarecrow Press. ISBN 978-0-81-088026-9.
- Gaye, Freda, ed. (1967). Who's Who in the Theatre (fourteenth ed.). London: Sir Isaac Pitman and Sons. OCLC 5997224.
- Macqueen-Pope, W. J. (1975). The Footlights Flickered. London: Severn House. ISBN 0-72-780042-6.
- Marshall, Michael (1978). Top Hat & Tails: The Story of Jack Buchanan. London: Elm Tree Books. ISBN 0-24-189602-9.
- Parker, John, ed. (1939). Who's Who in the Theatre (ninth ed.). London: Sir Isaac Pitman and Sons. OCLC 473894893.
- Parker, John, ed. (1947). Who's Who in the Theatre (tenth ed.). London: Sir Isaac Pitman and Sons. OCLC 225162446.
- Wearing, J. P. (2014). The London Stage, 1920–1929: A Calendar of Productions, Performers and Personne (second ed.). Lanham: Rowman & Littlefield. ISBN 978-0-81-089301-6.
