= Ian Gardiner (actor) =

British actor (1928–2021)

- Born: October 2, 1928; Brentwood, Essex, England
- Died: August 17, 2021 (aged 92)
- Occupation: Actor
- Notable work: Playing the role of Reginald Molehusband in a British public information film in 1967
- Spouse: Janet Davies (1954-1986) Theresa Forsyth

Ian Gardiner (October 2, 1928 – August 17, 2021) was a British actor whose career included stage, television, and commercial work. He is best known for playing the character Reginald Molehusband in a 1967 public information film promoting safe driving. The character became widely recognized in British popular culture.

== Early life and education ==
Ian Gardiner was born in Brentwood, Essex, the third of four children. His parents, Annie and Archibald Gardiner, were both doctors. His father died of pneumonia when Ian was three years old. The family later relocated to Maidstone, Kent, where Gardiner attended school. At age 14, he played the title role in a school production of Henry V. After completing national service, he trained at the Webber Douglas Academy of Dramatic Art in London.

== Career ==
Gardiner made his West End debut in 1953 at the Palace Theatre in The Love Match, playing the son of characters portrayed by Thora Hird and Arthur Askey. He went on to work extensively in repertory theatre and toured both nationally and internationally. Notable productions included Present Laughter (Vaudeville Theatre, 1981), Dirty Linen (Arts Theatre, 1982), and The Rocky Horror Show, in which he played the narrator on tour in the UK and Italy.

He also appeared on British television in series such as Dr Finlay’s Casebook, Compact, and Z-Cars. He worked on BBC Schools Television, did commercial voiceovers, and appeared in various advertisements.

== Reginald Molehusband ==
Gardiner became most widely known for his role as Reginald Molehusband, a fictional character created for a British public information film in 1967. The film was produced by the Central Office of Information and aimed to promote better parallel parking. Molehusband was portrayed as a nervous, cautious driver who finally succeeds at parking properly. The character’s name became synonymous with awkward or overly careful driving.

No known copy of the original film survives, although the audio track is still available. According to some reports, Gardiner was paid £10 for the role. In 2006, Gardiner re-created the scene for a modern BBC segment using the original narration, which became his final television appearance.

== Personal life ==
Gardiner married actress Janet Davies in January 1954. They met during their run in The Love Match. Davies later became known for her role as Mrs Pike in Dad’s Army. The couple had one son, Andrew. Janet Davies died from breast cancer in 1986. Gardiner later married his second wife, actress Teresa Forsyth.

== Death ==
Ian Gardiner died on August 17, 2021 at the age of 92.
