= Askey =

Askey is a surname. Notable people with the name include:

- Arthur Askey (1900–1982), British comedian
- Anthea Askey (1933–1999), English actress
- Colin Askey (born 1932), English footballer
- Gil Askey (1925–2014), American jazz trumpeter, composer, producer and musical director
- John Askey (born 1964), English footballer
- Richard Askey (1933–2019), American mathematician
- Tom Askey (born 1974), American ice hockey goaltender

== See also ==
- ASCII, a computer character set
