= Glenn Melvyn =

English comic actor (1918–1999)

- Melvyn in Coronation Street, 1964
- Born: Aron Clempert; 12 November 1918; Manchester, England
- Died: 9 March 1999 (aged 80); Kingston-upon-Thames, London, England
- Occupations: Actor, playwright

Glenn Melvyn (born Aron Clempert; 12 November 1918 – 9 March 1999) was an English comic actor and writer.

== Life and career ==
He was born in Manchester, the son of variety performers John Clempert, an escapologist, and his wife Nellie, one of the Carson Sisters, a song and dance act. After serving in the military in the Second World War, he joined a successful repertory company, Frank H. Fortescue's Famous Players, based in Bramhall, Cheshire. There, he met and mentored a younger actor, Ronnie Barker, who later stated that Melvyn had been a decisive influence on his own comic characterisations and performances, including the stutter used by Barker in Open All Hours.

In the early 1950s, Melvyn worked frequently as a foil to comedian Arthur Askey. He wrote The Love Match, which he performed with Askey at the Palace Theatre in Shaftesbury Avenue and which in 1955 was made into a film, also starring Thora Hird and Shirley Eaton. He also appeared with Askey in the 1956 film Ramsbottom Rides Again. Working with comedian Danny Ross, Melvyn wrote and performed in several shows at the Grand Theatre, Blackpool in the 1950s, including Love and Kisses (1955), which was developed as a television series starring Askey, Melvyn and Ross. Melvyn also produced the stage shows Friends and Neighbours (1958), and Pillar to Post (1960).

During the 1960s, Melvyn appeared in several television shows, including Hugh and I, Z Cars, Coronation Street, and The Ronnie Barker Playhouse.

He died in Kingston-upon-Thames in 1999, at the age of 80.
