= Sabrina (actress) =

English model and actress (1936–2016)

- Sabrina in London, 1955
- Born: Norma Ann Sykes; 19 May 1936; Stockport, Cheshire, England
- Died: 24 November 2016 (aged 80); Los Angeles, California, U.S.
- Other name: Sabby
- Occupations: Model; actress; singer
- Spouse: Harold Melsheimer (m. 1967; div. 1974)
- Website: Encyclopedia Sabrina – sabrina.nylon.net

Norma Ann Sykes (19 May 1936 – 24 November 2016), better known as Sabrina or Sabby, was an early English glamour model and actress.

According to film studies academic Pam Cook writing in British Stars and Stardom, Sabrina was one of "a host of exotic, glamorous (British) starlets ... modelled on the likes of Marilyn Monroe, Jayne Mansfield and Lana Turner."

Adrian Bingham and Martin Conboy, however, argue that Sykes represented possibly the first example of the modern 'glamour model' in the British context, due to the media's increasingly sexualised content of the 1950s and its appetite for female glamour. In contrast to American stars, they argue, Sykes was "famous only for her looks and not for any acting, dancing or singing abilities", and was helped by the media to become one of the biggest stars of the 1950s.

== Early life and career ==
Norma Ann Sykes was born on 19 May 1936 at Stepping Hill Hospital in Stockport, Cheshire, to Walter and Annie Sykes. She lived in Buckingham Street, Heaviley, for about 13 years and attended St George's School there, before moving with her mother to Blackpool. She spent some time in hospital with rheumatic fever. At the age of 16, she moved to London, where she worked as a waitress and did some nude modelling, posing for Russell Gay in a photoshoot that led to her appearance on the five of spades in a deck of nude playing cards.

In 1955, she was chosen to play a dumb blonde in Arthur Askey's television series Before Your Very Eyes (BBC 1952–1956, ITV 1956–1958). Her appearances in episodes from 18 February 1955 to 20 April 1956 made her a household name. She was promoted by the BBC as "the bosomy blonde who didn't talk", but surviving kinescope episodes clearly show that she did.

== Film career ==
Around July 1955, James Beney, of Walton Films, released a 100-foot, 9.5mm short glamour film, At Home with Sabrina.

In 1955 she made her feature film debut as Trixie in Stock Car, a Wolf Rilla-directed drama. She then appeared in a small role in the 1956 film Ramsbottom Rides Again. In her third film, Blue Murder at St Trinian's (1957), she had a non-speaking role in which, despite sharing equal billing with the star Alastair Sim on posters and appearing in many publicity stills in school uniform, she was required only to sit up in bed wearing a nightdress, reading a book, while the action took place around her.

The short film Goodnight with Sabrina (1959, 3:49 minutes) is included with Beat Girl (1960), remastered in 2016 by BFI Flipside.

Sabrina's penultimate film role was in the western The Phantom Gunslinger (1970), (Note: Although it was not released until 1970, the film was produced in 1967.) in which she starred alongside Troy Donahue. Her final film was the horror movie The Ice House (1969), replacing Jayne Mansfield, who had been cast two years previously, shortly before her death in a car crash.

== Personal life ==
In 1958, she was awarded an honorary D.Litt. by the University of Leeds. On 27 November 1967, she married Harold Melsheimer (born 11 June 1927 in Germany), a Hollywood gynaecologist and obstetrician. They divorced ten years later.

In 2007, there were newspaper reports that Sabrina had become a hermit, "living in squalor" in a Spanish-style house on a street known as 'Smog Central', under the flightpath of Burbank Airport. Sabrina admitted that she was confined to the house due to back problems, but denied living in squalor.

Having suffered from ill health for many years, partly owing to botched back surgery, she died of blood poisoning in 2016, at the age of 80.

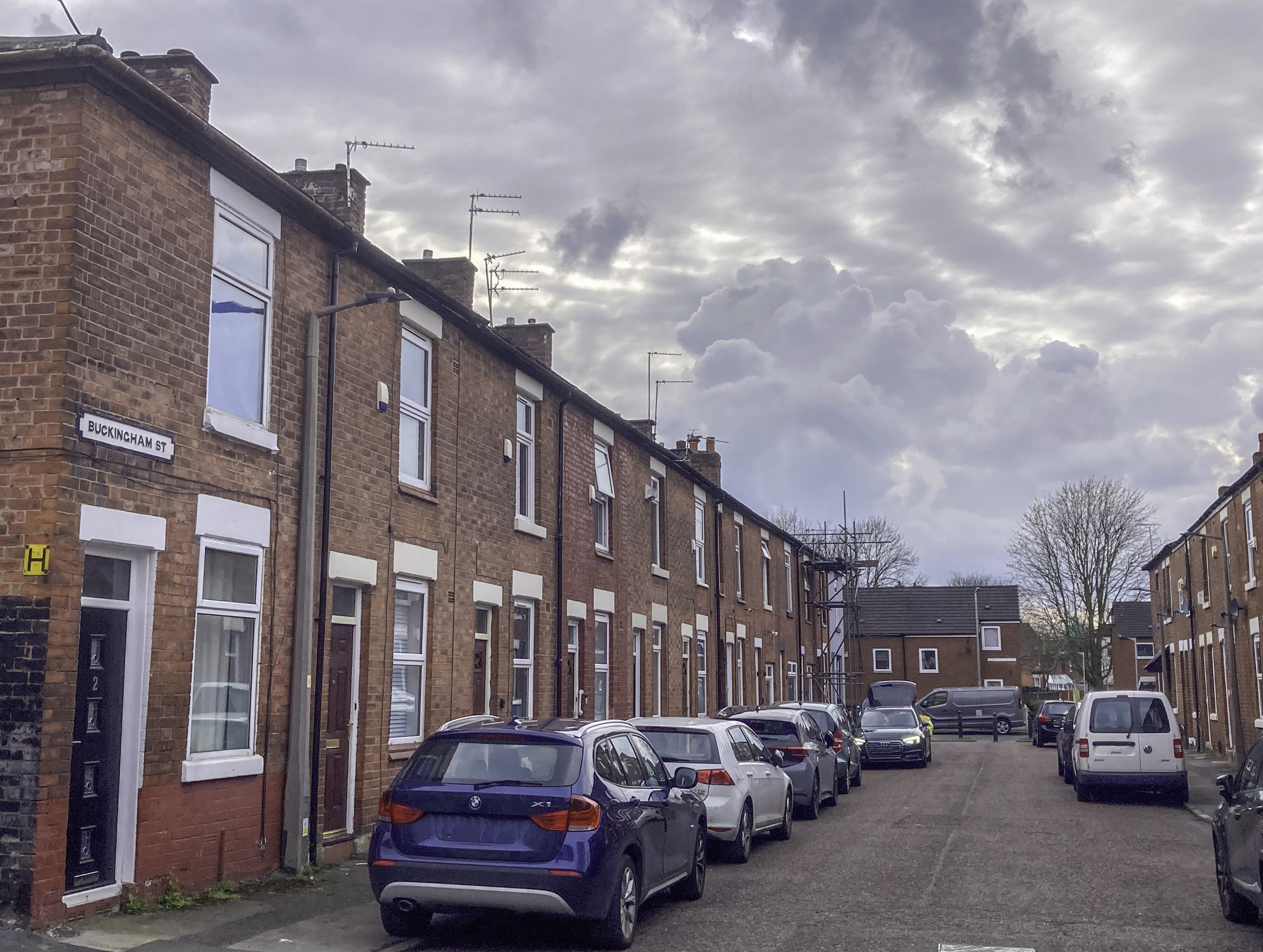
Buckingham Street, Heaviley, Stockport, UK. Early home of Sabrina.

== Cultural impact ==
- The comedy series The Goon Show contains numerous oaths to Sabrina's bosom, such as "By the measurements of Sabrina!" and "By the sweaters of Sabrina!"
- In "The Scandal Magazine", an episode of the radio programme Hancock's Half Hour, Sid James plays the editor of a sleazy gossip magazine that has carried an embarrassing story about Tony Hancock. James tells Hancock that his readers "will believe anything. ... If I told them that Sabrina was Arthur Askey's mother, they'd believe me." Hancock replies, "Well, I don't", pauses and asks, "She's not, is she?" James says emphatically "No", but Hancock reflects, "Mind you, there is a resemblance ...".
- In another episode, set in a dysfunctional boys school, Sabrina is referenced and the response is "Well, they'll know how to count up to 39 then."
- Brewer's Dictionary of Phrase and Fable gives a definition for "Hunchfront of Lime Grove" as "a somewhat unappealing nickname given to the generously endowed starlet known as Sabrina."
- In the 1950s members of the Royal Air Force dubbed parts of the Hawker Hunter jet fighter plane "Sabrinas" owing to two large cartridge collection pods on the underside of the aircraft.
- In the late 1950s, British lorry builder ERF produced a semi-forward control heavy goods vehicle (HGV) with a short protruding bonnet. These vehicles were nicknamed "Sabrinas" because they had "a little more in front".
- The Western Welsh Omnibus Company of Cardiff, South Wales had some coaches with protruding front windscreens which were nicknamed "Sabrinas" by the staff.
- The 1959 Triumph TR3S 1985 cc iron-block alloy-headed engine was called "Sabrina" because of its dome-shaped cam covers.
- In 1974, the British motoring press gave the name "Sabrinas" to the oversized pairs of protruding rubber bumper blocks (see dagmar bumpers) added to the MG MGB, Midget and Triumph TR6 sports cars, when U.S. safety regulations mandated sturdier impact protection. The name stuck and is used around the world.
- The tops of the rear strut mounts for the Lotus Elite Type 14 are known as Sabrina domes because of their shape and prominence.

== Television appearances ==
- Before Your Very Eyes (BBC, 1955–1956, ten episodes)
- Double Your Money (ITV, 1955)
- Tarzan (NBC, one episode, 1967) as Millie
- This Is Your Life (ITV, subject: Arthur Askey, 1974) as guest

== Film appearances ==
- Stock Car (1955) as Trixie
- At Home with Sabrina (short, 1955) as herself
- Ramsbottom Rides Again (1956) as girl
- Blue Murder at St. Trinian's (1957) as Virginia
- Just My Luck (1957)
- Goodnight with Sabrina (short, 1959) as herself
- Make Mine a Million (1959) as herself
- Satan in High Heels (1962) as herself, singer: "I Would If I Could" and "What Have You Done for Me Lately" (Lawrence/Freeman)
- House of the Black Death (1965) as blond belly dancer
- The Ice House (1969) as Venus De Marco
- The Phantom Gunslinger (1970) as Margie
