= Boots, Boots, Boots =

- Dad's Army episode
- Episode no.: Series 4 Episode 3
- Directed by: David Croft
- Story by: Jimmy Perry and David Croft
- Original air date: 9 October 1970
- Running time: 30 minutes

Episode chronology
← Previous "Don't Forget the Diver"	Next → "Sgt – Save My Boy!"

"Boots, Boots, Boots" is the third episode of the fourth series of the British comedy series Dad's Army. It was originally transmitted on Friday 9 October 1970.

== Synopsis ==
Captain Mainwaring implements an unpopular series of lengthy marches to achieve the three Fs – fast feet, functional feet and fit feet.

== Plot ==
Mainwaring is giving a lecture on transportation and tells the men that whatever mode of transport they use, it all comes down to the same thing: "the three Fs – fast feet, functional feet, and fit feet". Producing two diagrams, he gives one to Wilson. Mainwaring unrolls his diagram, which displays a human foot in perfect working order, which is what everyone's foot should look like in a nicely fitting shoe. Wilson unrolls his diagram to show a ravaged foot, covered in bruises, corns and bunions, which has been in an ill-fitting shoe.

Mainwaring proceeds to inspect the platoon's feet, despite having a slight problem in his back that eventually results in him using a chair to inspect the men's feet. After he has finished, he concludes that everyone's feet are fine, but he decides to impose some long route marches to get their feet up to scratch.

After a fifteen-mile march, Mainwaring asks the men to have their feet ready for inspection in five minutes, while he and Wilson have a chat in the office. Mainwaring confides in Wilson that he knows that he is a shy and sensitive man who handles the men quietly and subtly. So, he offers to inspect Wilson's feet in private. Wilson protests by asking Mainwaring who will inspect his feet. Mainwaring agrees and proposes that he will show Wilson his if he shows Mainwaring his.

Meanwhile, Walker proposes some foot salve for Pike and Frazer. Frazer is none too keen on the idea, but when Walker announces that they do not have to pay for it if they do not like it, he assents. Mainwaring and Wilson reappear and inspect the men's feet, and it is revealed that the foot salve is in fact a felt tip pen. Mainwaring is not impressed with the men's feet and proposes route marches and games of football in bare feet.

After a few days, it is beginning to take its toll on the platoon, especially Pike, who has a nightmare about marching in bare feet, which are all swollen and blistered. The next morning, Mrs Pike confronts Wilson in Mainwaring's office about Frank's feet and tells him to ask Mainwaring to not let Frank go on any more marches. After his mother storms off, Frank apprises Wilson of a plan to avoid a twenty-mile march on Saturday: swap Mainwaring's boots over for a half a size smaller. Wilson thinks this is a good idea, not realising that the rest of Jones' section have had the same idea.

Jones' section enters Sedgewick's Shoe Shop, where Mainwaring buys his boots, and tell Mr Sedgewick that Jones is becoming an officer, so they need a pair of size 8 boots for him, but they must be the same sort that Mainwaring has. After he finds a pair, Godfrey pretends to feel faint, and Sedgewick goes out the back to get a glass of water, leaving the pair of boots on the stool. Jones scrambles up the ladder to try to find a pair of shoes half a size smaller than Mainwaring's, but then realises he does not know Mainwaring's shoe size in the first place.

Sedgewick returns and gives Godfrey the water. He says it is not enough, and Sedgewick reluctantly goes to fetch another one, but the men have forgotten to ask about Mainwaring's boots and are shocked when Sedgewick comes back with a full jug. Frazer asks about Mainwaring's shoe size and he comments that he takes a 6½. Between the four of them, Jones' section finishes the jug and asks for more. As Sedgewick trudges out, Jones searches desperately for a size 6, eventually finding one. When Sedgewick returns, they blame the mess on a mouse, and quickly make their escape.

Later, Pike and Wilson arrive and initiate the same plan, with every detail exactly the same. Wilson is therefore surprised when Sedgewick knows that he is feeling faint and goes out to get a glass of water.

The next morning, Mainwaring arrives stiffly, wearing the pair of size 6 shoes. He hobbles into the office, just as Mr Sedgewick arrives with the pair of boots he left for repair last week: a 6½. The men joke with Mainwaring, not realising the truth, even when Mainwaring jovially tells Jones to lead the men off on their twenty-mile march.

== Cast ==
- Arthur Lowe as Captain Mainwaring
- John Le Mesurier as Sergeant Wilson
- Clive Dunn as Lance Corporal Jones
- John Laurie as Private Frazer
- James Beck as Private Walker
- Arnold Ridley as Private Godfrey
- Ian Lavender as Private Pike
- Bill Pertwee as ARP Warden Hodges
- Janet Davies as Mrs Pike
- Erik Chitty as Mr Sedgewick

== Notes ==
1. While toughening up his platoon's feet, Mainwairing has them take part in a barefoot football match. The song played during this is "I Came, I Saw, I Conga'd".
2. The title of this episode is drawn from the song of the same name, which is heard in the episode.
