= James Casey (variety artist) =

English comedian and radio producer

- Born: James Casey; 16 August 1922; Stockton-on-Tees, County Durham, England
- Died: 23 April 2011 (aged 88); Stockton-on-Tees, County Durham, England
- Occupations: Stage comedian, BBC Radio scriptwriter and producer
- Spouse(s): Joan, son David Casey, daughter Sue Casey

James Casey (16 August 1922 – 23 April 2011), known professionally as Jim Casey, was at various times during his long career a Variety comedian on the English music-halls, a scriptwriter for BBC Radio's variety shows and situation comedies, and a senior BBC Radio Light Entertainment producer.

He was the son of the English Variety comedian Jimmy James, and cousin of comedian Eli Woods.

In the 1940s, he and Eli Woods appeared in his father's variety act, known as Jimmy James and Co. After retiring from the BBC in the 1980s, he resurrected the act and toured the surviving variety theatres performing it with Woods for the following twenty five years.

His most notable discoveries during his career at BBC Radio in Manchester, between 1954 and 1982, were the radio comedian Jimmy Clitheroe, the comedian Les Dawson, the comedian Ken Dodd, and the comedy double-act known professionally as Hinge and Bracket, each of whom he launched into a career in radio light entertainment with their own BBC series.

His most successful series for BBC Radio was creating, producing and co-writing The Clitheroe Kid, starring the diminutive comic Jimmy Clitheroe, which ran continuously for sixteen years on the BBC Light Programme and BBC Radio 2, running from 1957 to 1972 inclusive, based on a chance meeting with Jimmy Clitheroe on a Variety bill in 1952.

During the Second World War he served in the ranks in the Royal Armoured Corps from 1941 and as an officer in the Durham Light Infantry from 1944, landing on the Normandy beaches on D-Day with the 9th Battalion DLI in 1944. He was interviewed at length about his wartime experiences by the Imperial War Museum as part of their Durham Light Infantry oral history project.

== Biography ==
James Casey, born in 1922 at Stockton-on-Tees in England, was the son of the variety comedian Jimmy James. While his two children were still young, he moved to London; but within a couple of years his wife's favourite aunt was taken seriously ill, and the family moved to Liverpool to take care of her. It was here Casey began writing comedy for the BBC's Light Entertainment Department, submitting scripts to BBC Radio's North Region under the pen name Cass James (which was, at that time, his usual stage name). These were such a success that he would spend the next 26 years commuting between Crosby on Merseyside and BBC Broadcasting House in Manchester.

In the spirit of the theatre, James Casey was metaphorically born in a trunk, and lived literally in a wicker basket whilst his father and mother performed on stage, one of them looking after him in the wings or in the dressing room while the other was performing a few feet away. If they were both on stage together, he was simply left in his basket in the wings. As he grew older, however, he was not allowed a speaking part in the act, because his father wanted him to become a lawyer rather than go on the stage with all its uncertainties.

A career in the law was not to be, though, and when he came out of the Army at the end of the war he tried to sort out his father's disastrous financial affairs. Though teetotal, Jimmy James was a compulsive gambler, and went bankrupt three times. On the final occasion on which he faced the bankruptcy court, completely deadpan, he announced to the surprised assembly: "I presume I have now won the Official Receiver outright!" Before he died in 1965, Jimmy James was earning £275 a week as top of the bill at Skegness; a huge sum for the time.

It was during the late 'Forties that James Casey first joined the act, in three-handed sketches: with his father in the centre bouncing gags off him on one side and his cousin, Jack Casey (who originally used the stage name Bretton Woods, but was later better known as Eli Woods), on the other. James junior quickly discovered a greater talent for writing the sketches. So when his father moved into radio, James Casey ended up writing everything, including editions showcasing other comedians: for the radio series Northern Variety Parade, he wrote scripts not only for his father but also for popular comedians such as Norman Evans, for whom Casey wrote Over the Garden Wall style sketches. Jimmy James's radio broadcasts, written by his son, were in radio series such as The Mayor's Parlour and Home James; and, since each series pulled in huge audiences, Casey was offered a staff job as a BBC producer.

He also teamed up with Jimmy Clitheroe, who already had film experience and had worked with Jimmy James in Variety. Only 4'3" tall, before he became famous Clitheroe played Frank Randle's dummy in ventriloquist sketches, at the end of which he would jump from the fake ventriloquist's knee and run off into the wings to show he wasn't in fact a doll. In 1955, at Casey's prompting, Clitheroe appeared in Call Boy, a radio variety series featuring popular stars of the day including Ted Lune, Margery Manners and Dennis Goodwin. Written mainly by Casey, writing under his stage name 'Cass James', assisted by Frank Roscoe and Ronnie Taylor, the initial sketches featuring Jimmy Clitheroe were short 8-minute items, but within three years had expanded into the full-length situation comedy The Clitheroe Kid, written mainly – and produced solely – by James Casey, who was now writing and producing under his real name.

The combination of Casey's versatile scripts and Jimmy Clitheroe's impetuous cheek proved a winner. Stalwarts Patricia Burke as mother, and Peter Sinclair as grandad, were complemented by Diana Day as Jimmy's older sister Susan (nicknamed "Scraggy Neck"), her gormless boy friend "Daft Alfie" played by Danny Ross, and Tony Melody as Mr Higginbottom their rough-hewn neighbour.

According to Casey himself, the scripts sometimes arrived too late for any kind of proper rehearsal. Whereas Life with the Lyons had no fewer than eight dry runs, before the ninth performance went out live, the professionals in The Clitheroe Kid had no such luxury. Only rarely, however, did any of them miss a cue or come in early. Nevertheless, they could occasionally be heard stifling a laugh, at Jimmy's preposterous comments or Danny Ross's splutterings as he became tongue-tied and came out with ridiculous statements and gaffes; a sharp cry of "Ooh me leg!" meant Jimmy had just (pretended to) kick him.

Two famous comedians owed their professional careers almost entirely to Casey, who discovered, honed and marketed them. When he spotted Les Dawson in a Manchester club he immediately recognised great talent, but it took five years to persuade the BBC to try him out on radio. When they did, Casey wrote the jokes for Listen with Les for 12 years. When he saw the first scripts, Dawson remarked that they were more like him than he was himself.

Casey spotted Ken Dodd at the Sunderland Empire on the same bill as his father, and challenged the BBC's initial assessment that Dodd was suitable only for television. Much later, David Hatch asked James Casey if he would again produce Ken Dodd on radio, as he was the only person the now famous comedian trusted. He did, and Dodd recorded several over-length live shows, which Casey edited, almost non-stop over a period of 24 days, to create the series: the resulting six programmes being a notable success.

One difficulty was that Ken Dodd was often up to two hours late for the rehearsals. To combat this, Casey contracted everyone else to turn up at noon, while Dodd was contracted to turn up at 10 am. He was still two hours late, so he thought, but now it no longer held up production. However, once he discovered what Casey had done the ploy had to be abandoned. Early finishes rarely happened either.

Another successful comedy series Casey produced was Hinge and Bracket, who he initially thought were two genuine old ladies when he first saw their act on TV. It was fellow BBC producer Mike Craig who, highly amused, pointed out that they were actually two young men in drag. The closing credits on the resulting series, which he produced, included a reference to him as Gentleman James Casey, a typically Northern compliment, meaning a genuine gentlemen.

A promising Des O'Connor radio series was ruined by the BBC reneging on the promise of a prime weekend timeslot; but Mike Yarwood and the young Morecambe and Wise also profited from Casey's witty scripts. He also worked closely with Eric and Ernie's eventual TV scriptwriter Eddie Braben (in the comedy sketch series The Worst Show on the Wireless – in which his son David Casey, and his cousin Eli Woods, also featured), produced Roy Castle on radio in Castle's on the Air (Roy Castle had begun his career, in the 1950s, as a member of Jimmy James and Co in the variety theatres), and he discovered and promoted a young Alison Steadman (also in The Worst Show on the Wireless).

In 1982 he retired from the BBC, just before Ken Dodd could ask him to produce yet more radio shows. Upon retiring from radio, Casey revived his father's variety act to great acclaim with Roy Castle and Eli Woods, on The Michael Parkinson Show on BBC television in 1982. As a result of that appearance, they were invited to include the act in that year's Royal Variety Performance. With Woods, Casey then worked the surviving variety theatres with the act for the following 25 years.

As a measure of his stature within the profession, many famous stars willingly appeared as the second stooge in the act during those years, including Roy Castle, Ray Alan, Jimmy Cricket, Roy Hudd, Paul Shane, Reg Varney, Les Dawson, Mike Craig, Don McLean, Charlie Williams, Dave Evans, and Johnny Casson.

It is still possible to hear The Clitheroe Kid, Listen to Les, and Hinge and Bracket, on BBC Radio 4 Extra.
