= Don't Fence Me In =

Don't Fence Me In may refer to:

- "Don't Fence Me In" (song), a song written by Cole Porter and Robert Fletcher
- Don't Fence Me In (song), a cover by David Byrne on the 1990 Cole Porter tribute album Red Hot + Blue.
- Don't Fence Me In (Decca album), a 1946 78 rpm album with Bing Crosby and the Andrews Sisters
- Don't Fence Me In (Lari White album), 1996 album by Lari White
- "Don't Fence Me In" (Dad's Army), episode of the British television series Dad's Army
- Don't Fence Me In (film), a 1945 film starring Roy Rogers
- "Don't Fence Me In", episode of the British television series Goodnight Sweetheart
