= The Arthur Askey Show =

1961 British TV sitcom

- Genre: Sitcom
- Starring: Arthur Askey; June Whitfield; Arthur Mullard; Patricia Hayes
- Country of origin: United Kingdom
- No. of episodes: 6

Production
- Running time: 30 minutes
- Production company: ATV

Original release
- Network: ITV
- Release: 11 March – 15 April 1961

The Arthur Askey Show is a black-and-white British sitcom starring Arthur Askey that ran for six episodes in 1961. It was written by Dave Freeman. It was made for the ITV network by ATV. The following year Askey appeared in another series Raise Your Glasses on the BBC.

== Cast ==
- Arthur Askey – Arthur Pilbeam
- June Whitfield – Emily Pilbeam
- Arthur Mullard – Mr. Rossiter
- Patricia Hayes – Mrs. Rossiter

== Plot ==
The Arthur Askey Show is set in 1910. Arthur Pilbeam's wife, Emily, is considerably younger than he is. The next door neighbours are Mr. and Mrs. Rossiter. Amongst the guest stars to make appearances are Sam Kydd, who had appeared in Arthur's Treasured Volumes the year before, and Guy Middleton.

== Episodes ==
1. "Episode One" (11 Mar 1961)
2. "Episode Two" (18 Mar 1961)
3. "Pilbeam, the Journalist" (25 Mar 1961)
4. "Episode Four" (1 Apr 1961)
5. "Episode Five" (8 Apr 1961)
6. "Episode Six" (15 Apr 1961)

Six more episodes were made, but they were never transmitted. All twelve episodes still exist.

== 1959 show ==
The Arthur Askey Show was also the name of a six-part ITV stand-up and sketch show featuring Arthur Askey that ran sporadically from 28 February 1959 to 3 September 1960. Three episodes lasted 55 minutes, and three lasted 60 minutes.
