= The Big Parade (Dad's Army) =

- Dad's Army episode
- Episode no.: Series 4 Episode 1
- Directed by: David Croft
- Story by: Jimmy Perry and David Croft
- Original air date: 25 September 1970
- Running time: 30 minutes

Episode chronology
← Previous "Resisting the Aggressor Down the Ages"	Next → "Don't Forget the Diver"

"The Big Parade" is the first episode of the fourth series of the British comedy series Dad's Army. It was originally transmitted on Friday 25 September 1970.

== Synopsis ==
Captain Mainwaring decides to supply the platoon with a mascot for the big 'Spitfire Week' parade.

== Plot ==
After watching a film at the cinema, Mainwaring and Wilson notice, on the newsreel, Winston Churchill admiring a Czech regiment, and their regimental mascot, a ram. This gives Mainwaring an idea. He tries to tell Wilson, who is more interested in trying to kiss Mrs Pike, and Jones, who is in a passionate embrace with Mrs Fox. However, he is interrupted by the air raid siren.

The following evening, Mainwaring mentions a big parade of all civil defence units, and believes that they should have a mascot on the parade. Many ideas are suggested, including a live painted lady, a white mouse and a large domestic cat. It is Wilson who comes up trumps by suggesting that they have a ram as well. Private Sponge, who is a sheep farmer, mentions that he has a few suitable rams, and grants Mainwaring permission to catch one if they can. Warden Hodges enters with a chart showing the positions of each group in the parade, and he and Mainwaring argue as to who should lead the procession.

A few days later, Mainwaring and Wilson take Jones' section to Sponge's farm to catch the ram. They attempt to creep up on the ram, but as they try to grab it, it runs away. The platoon give chase, until it vanishes. Mainwaring sends Pike to look for it. He hears the ram bleating, and runs through a bush. Suddenly, he screams, and a sloshing sound is heard.

Whilst in his search for the ram, Wilson discovers Pike stuck in a muddy bog, and sinking rapidly. Wilson attempts to reach him, but gets caught on some barbed wire. They call to the rest of the platoon, who eventually find them. Much to Wilson's annoyance, Mainwaring declares that Pike's predicament should take top priority. They remove their shirts and trousers and lay them down on top of the bog, with Sponge lying on top of the clothes. Lying down on top of Sponge, Mainwaring is able to lean across the bog and pull Pike out.

Frazer notices that Jones is missing. Godfrey is shocked to see Jones' forage cap resting on top of the bog. Sponge lays down again, and Frazer attempts to feel for Jones, with no success. The platoon are saddened, until they see Jones returning with a rope to rescue Pike. Whilst marching back, Hodges watches with glee as the muddy platoon trudge by, but is frustrated that he cannot think of any insult to offer them.

As the parade approaches, Walker suggests another method. He shows Mainwaring a picture of a magnificent ram, but turns up with a little mangy, moth-eaten goat with hardly a scrap of wool on it. Mainwaring angrily retrieves his £5 note, which is promptly eaten by the goat. It is decided that they will march without a mascot.

The parade is forming, and Hodges is still under the impression that his Wardens are leading it, so he is shocked when Mainwaring's platoon form up in front of him. Mainwaring signals the Verger, who is Skipper of the Sea Scouts' band, to lead off. As they march down the road, Hodges and the Wardens attempt to overtake the platoon, and it quickly turns into a marching race through Walmington-on-Sea.

== Cast ==
- Arthur Lowe as Captain Mainwaring
- John Le Mesurier as Sergeant Wilson
- Clive Dunn as Lance Corporal Jones
- John Laurie as Private Frazer
- James Beck as Private Walker
- Arnold Ridley as Private Godfrey
- Ian Lavender as Private Pike
- Bill Pertwee as ARP Warden Hodges
- Edward Sinclair as The Verger
- Janet Davies as Mrs Pike
- Pamela Cundell as Mrs Fox
- Colin Bean as Private Sponge
- Philip Hannant as Drum Major

== Notes ==
1. When Hodges leaves the church hall after his argument with Mainwaring, the platoon insult him by whistling the Laurel and Hardy theme tune when he walks.
2. The Teddy Bears' Picnic is being played when the Home Guard struggle to catch the ram.
3. Just before Jones' section attempt to grab the ram, Pike makes a reference to the film The Last of the Mohicans (1938), by sticking grass in his forage cap.
4. The episode title takes its name from the silent era classic film The Big Parade (1925).
5. In this episode it is revealed by the Verger, Mr Yeatman, that the Vicar once worked as a missionary.
6. The platoon have ceased using the original "Denim overalls, 1939 pattern" uniforms that they had worn since uniforms were first issued in "The Showing Up of Corporal Jones" and are now wearing Battledress uniforms made of wool serge. This includes the first use of the "CP1" formation badge on the tunic arm.
7. The Sea Scout band featured in "The Big Parade" was the 5th St. Mary's Sea Scouts from Great Yarmouth. All of their uniforms were debadged, then rebadged with Walmington-on-Sea and genuine merit badges of the day. Some of the extras had to wear WW2 style glasses and all had Melton shorts with knee length socks. The BBC went into great detail over the uniforms and apparel of the day.
