= Absent Friends =

Absent Friends may refer to:

- "To absent friends", a traditional toast
- Absent Friends (band), an Australian band
- Absent Friends (album) or the title song, by the Divine Comedy, 2004
- Absent Friends (play), by Alan Ayckbourn, 1974
- "Absent Friends" (Birds of a Feather), a 1993 television episode
- "Absent Friends" (Bugs), a 1998 television episode
- "Absent Friends" (Dad's Army), a 1970 television episode
- Absent Friends, a 2004 novel by S. J. Rozan
- "Absent Friends", a 1983 song by Fred Frith from Cheap at Half the Price

== See also ==
- "Absent Friend", the Swedish entry in the Eurovision Song Contest 1965
