= Living It Up (British TV series) =

- Genre: Sitcom
- Starring: Arthur Askey; Richard Murdoch; Anthea Askey; Danny Ross; Billy Percy; Hugh Morton
- Country of origin: United Kingdom
- No. of series: 2
- No. of episodes: 9

Production
- Running time: 30 minutes
- Production company: Associated-Rediffusion

Original release
- Network: ITV
- Release: 12 April 1957 – 1 December 1958

Living It Up was a black-and-white British sitcom starring Arthur Askey and Richard Murdoch that ran for nine episodes from 1957 to 1958. It was written by Sid Colin and Talbot Rothwell. It was made for the ITV network by Associated-Rediffusion. All nine episodes survive in the archives.

== Cast ==
- Arthur Askey - Himself
- Richard Murdoch - Stinker
- Anthea Askey - Herself
- Danny Ross - Props Boy
- Billy Percy - Postman & Milkman
- Hugh Morton

== Plot ==
Living It Up was a TV version of the BBC radio comedy Band Waggon, and a film had also been made starring impresario Jack Hylton. In Living It Up Arthur Askey and Stinker were living in a flat on top of the A-R's Television House in Aldwych. Askey's daughter appeared as herself, as she had done in Love and Kisses in 1955. The characters would often speak directly to the studio audience, and Leila Williams, who would later become Blue Peter's first female presenter, made a guest appearance, as did Valentine Dyall.

== Episodes ==
=== Series One (1957) ===
1. Episode One (12 April 1957)
2. Episode Two (26 April 1957)
3. Episode Three (10 May 1957)

=== Series Two (1958) ===
1. Episode One (27 October 1958)
2. Episode Two (3 November 1958)
3. Episode Three (10 November 1958)
4. Episode Four (17 November 1958)
5. Episode Five (24 November 1958)
6. Episode Six (1 December 1958)
