= June Whitfield =

English actress (1925–2018)

Dame June Whitfield DBE
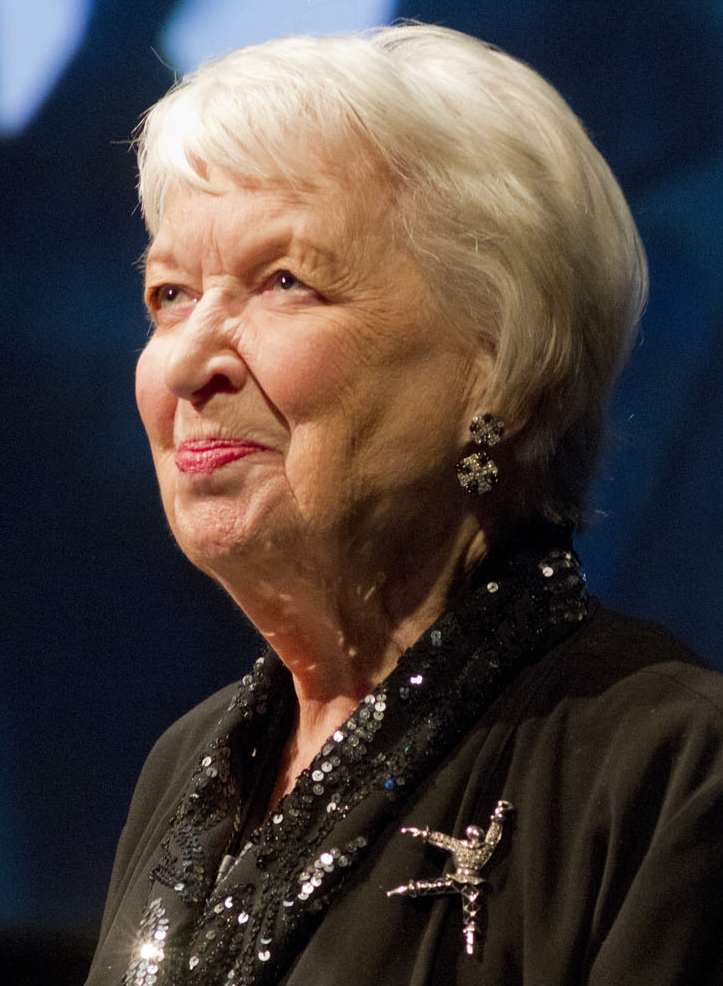
- Whitfield at the 2013 Slapstick Festival
- Born: June Rosemary Whitfield; 11 November 1925; Streatham, London, England
- Died: 29 December 2018 (aged 93); London, England
- Resting place: All Hallows Church, Tillington, West Sussex, England
- Occupation: Actress
- Years active: 1944–2016
- Known for: Carry On films; Terry and June; Absolutely Fabulous; Last of the Summer Wine; Miss Marple
- Spouse: Tim Aitchison (m. 1955; died 2001)
- Children: Suzy Aitchison

Dame June Rosemary Whitfield (11 November 1925 – 29 December 2018 (Note: The date of death has been consistently reported by the press as Friday 28 December 2018. However, the order of service for the funeral (pictured in the BBC source) clearly shows the dates "11th November 1925 – 29th December 2018", so it is understood that Whitfield died in the early hours of Saturday 29 December 2018.)) was an English actress.

Whitfield's big break was a lead in the radio comedy Take It from Here, which aired on the BBC Light Programme in 1953. Television roles soon followed, including appearances with Tony Hancock throughout his television career. In 1966, Whitfield played the leading role in the television sitcom Beggar My Neighbour, which ran for three series. She also appeared in four Carry On films: Carry On Nurse (1959), Carry On Abroad (1972), Carry On Girls (1973) and Carry On Columbus (1992).

In 1968, Whitfield and Terry Scott began a long television partnership, which peaked with roles as husband and wife in Happy Ever After (1974–1979) and Terry and June (1979–1987). From 1992 to 2016, Whitfield played Edina Monsoon's mother in Jennifer Saunders' Absolutely Fabulous. She played a regular character in Last of the Summer Wine (2005–2010) and a recurring character in The Green Green Grass (2007–2009).

From 1993 to 2001, Whitfield played Miss Marple in the radio dramatisation of all twelve of Agatha Christie's Miss Marple novels on BBC Radio 4.

== Early life ==
June Rosemary Whitfield was born at 44 Mount Ephraim Lane in Streatham, London, in 1925, to John Herbert Whitfield and his wife Bertha Georgina née Flett. Her father was the managing director of a company called Dictograph Telephones that had been founded by his father in Yorkshire, and both of her parents were keen amateur actors. She made her first stage appearance, aged three, after her mother enrolled her at Robinson's Dance Studio. Whitfield attended Streatham Hill High School, before being evacuated during the Second World War to Bognor Regis, where she attended St Michael's School, and then to Penzance in Cornwall. She moved with her parents to Huddersfield, where she learned shorthand and typing. She continued to study secretarial skills at Pitman's College, Brixton Hill. In 1944, Whitfield graduated from the Royal Academy of Dramatic Art with a diploma.

== Career ==
=== Early career ===
Whitfield began her career in the 1940s working with Wilfred Pickles, and worked on stage in the West End and the regions.

In 1951, she had her first credited television role in The Passing Show and joined the London cast of the musical South Pacific.

Her big break came in 1953 when she replaced Joy Nichols in the successful Frank Muir and Denis Norden radio comedy Take It from Here, co-starring Jimmy Edwards and Dick Bentley. In the portion of the show known as "The Glums" she played Eth, fiancée of the dim Ron Glum (played by Bentley). During the next fifteen years Whitfield had many supporting roles on television, including in Dixon of Dock Green, Arthur's Treasured Volumes, The Arthur Askey Show, Faces of Jim, The Benny Hill Show, Steptoe and Son and Frankie Howerd. She played the nurse in the opening scene of "The Blood Donor" (Hancock, 1961). Whitfield's daughter Suzy Aitchison played the same role in the 2009 re-recording with Paul Merton portraying Tony Hancock.

In 1959 she appeared in Carry On Nurse, the first of her four appearances in the Carry On film series.

=== 1960s to 1980s ===
Whitfield gained her first starring role in the sitcom Beggar My Neighbour (1966), playing Rose Garvey. The year after Beggar My Neighbour finished in 1968, she appeared on Scott On... for six years until 1974. This started a working relationship with Terry Scott that lasted until 1987. During Scott On... she also appeared in The Best Things in Life, The Goodies, The Dick Emery Show, Bless This House and The Pallisers. She appeared in the spin-off film of Bless This House (1972), with Scott as her husband, and Carry On Abroad (also 1972), followed by an appearance in Carry On Girls (1973).

Whitfield starred alongside Scott in a Comedy Playhouse sitcom pilot called Happy Ever After (1974). A few months later the first full series was broadcast, with a further four series until 1979. Later that year, they appeared together in the first series of Terry and June. The two sitcoms were very similar, the only main differences being a change of surname (from Fletcher to Medford), and a different house and family. Both had Scott and Whitfield as a suburban middle-class married couple. Terry and June ran for 65 episodes until 1987. Five years later, in 1992, Julian Clary created Terry and Julian, a Channel 4 sitcom which spoofed the title of Terry and June; Whitfield made an appearance in one episode. During the eight-year run of Terry and June, Whitfield also appeared in It Ain't Half Hot Mum and Minder.

In the 1970s and early 1980s Whitfield appeared in a series of television advertisements created for Birds Eye by advertising art director Vernon Howe, and featuring the concluding voice-over line: "it can make a dishonest woman of you!"

In 1971 Whitfield and Frankie Howerd recorded a novelty comic version of the song "Je t'aime", previously recorded by Jane Birkin and Serge Gainsbourg, in which she featured as "Mavis".

She was the subject of This Is Your Life on two occasions: in April 1976, when she was surprised by Eamonn Andrews at her home in Wimbledon; and in March 1995, when Michael Aspel surprised her at BBC Television Centre.

During the 1980s Whitfield returned to radio comedy. From 1984 she could be heard with Roy Hudd on the satire programme The News Huddlines, which finished in 2001. On it she often used impersonations and was known for her impression of the then Prime Minister Margaret Thatcher. During the 1980s and 1990s she made several stage appearances, including in a revival of An Ideal Husband and the pantomime Babes in the Wood. In 1985 she sang a duet with Ian Charleson of the Irving Berlin song "You're Just in Love" in A Royal Night of One Hundred Stars.

=== 1990s to 2010s ===
Having appeared in an episode of French and Saunders in 1988, Whitfield played Mother in Jennifer Saunders's sitcom Absolutely Fabulous from 1992 until 2012. In 2000 she featured with the rest of the Absolutely Fabulous cast in the pilot Mirrorball. From 1993 to 2001 she played Miss Marple in 12 radio adaptations of Agatha Christie's Miss Marple books. From 1990 she appeared in films including Carry On Columbus (1992), Jude (1996) and Faeries (1999, as the voice of Mrs Coombs). In 1998 Whitfield played the housekeeper in the London-set episode of Friends "The One with Ross's Wedding, Part Two" and voiced a character in an episode of the animated comedy series Rex the Runt.

Her autobiography And June Whitfield, written with the help of Christopher Douglas, appeared in 2000. She appeared in The Royal, followed by appearances in Midsomer Murders, Agatha Christie's Marple, New Tricks and Last of the Summer Wine, which she joined in 2005. She had an episode of The South Bank Show devoted to her on 29 July 2007 and, in the same year, appeared in the English National Opera's production of On the Town in London's West End. In November 2007, she appeared in the Only Fools and Horses spin-off The Green Green Grass as the mother of Marlene, and in 2008 she appeared in an episode of ITV medical drama Harley Street. In 2009, she made a guest appearance in Kingdom and published an updated autobiography, At a Glance ... An Absolutely Fabulous Life, a collection of scrapbook pictures from her life and career.

Whitfield appeared in the Doctor Who two-part episode, "The End of Time", that aired over Christmas 2009 – New Year 2010. On 29 December 2009, she was the subject of an entire evening's tribute programming on BBC Two.

In 2010 Whitfield was signed for a short appearance on ITV soap opera Coronation Street. Her character, May, appeared at the funeral of Blanche Hunt and explained to Blanche's daughter, Deirdre, how her mother had died. In 2011, she played Margaret Rutherford in the BBC Radio 4 play A Monstrous Vitality, a radio adaption by Andy Merriman of his biography of Rutherford, A Dreadnought with Good Manners. She reprised her role of Mother in two episodes of Absolutely Fabulous at Christmas 2011 – New Year 2012, and for an Olympic special on 23 July 2012. In 2013, Whitfield became the inaugural recipient of the Aardman Slapstick Comedy Legend Award, a recognition of her lifetime's contribution to the world of comedy. In 2014, she made a second appearance in Midsomer Murders, and appeared in Jonathan Creek. From 2014 to 2016 she appeared in the sitcom Boomers as the mother of Stephanie Beacham's character. In 2015, she played Granny Wallon in a BBC One adaptation of Laurie Lee's novel Cider with Rosie.

In May 2015 Whitfield made a guest appearance in the BBC soap EastEnders as a nun called Sister Ruth and returned to the show in January 2016 to complete a storyline. In October 2015, it was confirmed that she would reprise her role of Mother in Absolutely Fabulous: The Movie which was released in July 2016. She made a guest appearance as God in the Sky 1 series You, Me and the Apocalypse, which was broadcast in November 2015.

== Honours and awards ==
In 1982 Whitfield was made a Freeman of the City of London.

Whitfield was appointed Officer of the Order of the British Empire (OBE) in the 1985 Birthday Honours, Commander of the Order of the British Empire (CBE) in the 1998 Birthday Honours, and Dame Commander of the Order of the British Empire (DBE) in the 2017 Birthday Honours for services to drama and entertainment.

In 1994 Whitfield was given a Lifetime Achievement Award by the British Comedy Awards.

== Personal life ==
In 1955 she married Timothy John Aitchison, who was working as a surveyor. The couple had a daughter, Suzy Aitchison, who became an actress. Timothy Aitchison died in 2001.

Despite her success Whitfield never wanted a lead role, stating that she lacked the drive and confidence. She attributed the premature deaths of several comedians to "the responsibility, the stress and strain" of carrying their shows. In her autobiography she describes her own life as "full of love, affection and laughter, of gigs, gags and a couple of gongs".

In December 2017 Whitfield said that she was living in a care home.

== Death ==
She died in London on 29 December 2018, aged 93. Her funeral was held at All Hallows Church in Tillington, near Petworth in West Sussex, on 18 January 2019, attended by many of her co-stars and personal friends.

Fellow Absolutely Fabulous actress Jennifer Saunders paid tribute to the "extraordinary grace" of Whitfield and said she would "hugely" miss her "dear friend". Julia Sawalha described her as a "great source of inspiration". Actress Jane Horrocks said her former co-star was a "wonderful lady", who was "versatile, funny and generous".

== Radio ==
=== Miss Marple ===
Whitfield played Miss Marple in 12 BBC Radio 4 adaptations of novels by Agatha Christie. She reprised the role in 2015, starring in three adaptations of Miss Marple short stories (Tape-Measure Murder, The Case of the Perfect Maid, and Sanctuary).

=== Other ===
- Bring on the Girls (1955)
- Starstruck (1955)
- Take It from Here (1955)
- Midweek Theatre (1967)
- Happy Ever After (1976)
- It Doesn't Have to Hurt! (1990)
- Like They've Never Been Gone (1998–2002)
- The Afternoon Play: Seven Floors (2003)

== Filmography ==
=== Film ===
Year	Title	Role	Notes
1950	The 20 Questions Murder Mystery	Lady speaking in queue (uncredited)	
1953	Love from Judy	Sally McBride	TV movie
1956	The Straker Special	tomboy mechanic	TV movie
1957	Friday the 13th		TV movie
1959	Carry On Nurse	Meg	
1959	Friends and Neighbours	Doris Holmes	
1966	The Spy with a Cold Nose	Elsie Farquhar	
1968	Frankie Howerd Meets the Bee Gees		TV movie
1971	Do Me a Favour!	Mrs Dolly Hadleigh	TV movie
1971	The Magnificent Seven Deadly Sins	Mildred	Comedy montage
1972	Bless This House	Vera Baines	Spin-off from TV sitcom Bless This House
1972	Carry On Abroad	Evelyn Blunt	
1973	Carry On Girls	Augusta Prodworthy / Paula Perkins (voice)	
1974	Romance with a Double Bass	Prince Bibulov's Wife	Comedy short
1976	Not Now, Comrade	Janet Rimmington	
1979	The Lion, the Witch and the Wardrobe	Mrs Beaver	
1984	It's Going to Be Alright	Margie Hansen	TV movie
1985	Rupert and the Frog Song	Rupert's Mother (voice)	Animation
1987	It's a Hudd Hudd World		TV movie
1991	The Craig Ferguson Story	Mrs Ferguson	TV movie
1992	Carry On Columbus	Queen Isabella	
1996	Jude	Aunt Drusilla	
1999	Faeries	Mrs Coombs (voice)	Animation
1999	The Comedy Trail: A Shaggy Dog Story	Herself	TV special
2000	The Last of the Blonde Bombshells	Annie	TV movie
2003	Bob the Builder: The Knights of Can-a-Lot	Dot (voice)	UK dub; Animation
2007	Bob the Builder: Scrambler to the Rescue	Dot (voice)	UK dub; Animation; TV movie
2012	Run for Your Wife	Lady in gym class	
2015	Cider with Rosie	Granny Wallon	TV movie
2016	Absolutely Fabulous: The Movie	Mother	Last film role

== Television ==
Year	Title	Role	Notes
1951	The Passing Show	chorus member	1 episode: "1900–1910: The Years of Plenty", aired 16 April 1951
1954–1955	Fast and Loose	various characters	5 episodes
1955–1958	Before Your Very Eyes	various characters	6 episodes
1956	The Idiot Weekly, Price 2d	various characters	1 episode
1956–1957	The Tony Hancock Show	various characters	11 episodes
1957	Hancock's Half Hour	Miss Dubois	episode: "The Alpine Holiday"
1957	Yes, It's the Cathode-Ray Tube Show!	various characters (voice)	
1958	Dixon of Dock Green	Marie	1 episode: "The Key of the Nick"
1958	My Pal Bob		1 episode (#2.6)
1958	On with the Show		
1958–1959	Whack-O!	Edwina / Mrs Van Stuyvesant	2 episodes: #3.1 and #4.5
1959	It's Saturday Night		1 episode (#1.3)
1960	Arthur's Treasured Volumes	Enid Brown	1 episode: "A Blow in Anger"
1961	Hancock	Nurse	episode: "The Blood Donor"
1961	Hancock	Veronica Stillwell	episode: "The Succession: Son and Heir"
1961	The Arthur Askey Show	Emily Pilbeam	6 episodes
1961–1963	The Seven Faces of Jim	various characters, inc. Nettie Winbourne, Prue Abernathy, and Hannah Pengallon	7 episodes
1961–1968	The Benny Hill Show	various characters	4 episodes (#4.3, "Knicker's World", #8.2, #8.4)
1962	Christmas Night with the Stars	Eth	with Jimmy Edwards, episode aired 25 December 1962
1962	Six More Faces of Jim	Eth	6 episodes
1962	The Rag Trade	Miss Rawlins	
1962	Comedy Playhouse	Sandra Baxter	(series 1) "The Telephone Call"
1963	More Faces of Jim	various characters	
1964	A Child's Guide to Screenwriting	various characters (voice)	
1964	Baxter On...	various characters	
1964	How to be an Alien	(voice)	
1964	The Big Noise	Dorothy Tozer	
1964	Steptoe and Son	Madge	
1965	Call It What You Like	various characters	
1965	Six of the Best	Daffodil	
1966	Frankie Howerd	Beryl Cuttlebunt	
1966	Mild and Bitter	various characters	
1967	Christmas Night with the Stars	Rose Garvey	episode aired 25 December 1967
1967–1968	Beggar My Neighbour	Rose Garvey	
1968	Father, Dear Father	Mrs Parsons	
1968	Never a Cross Word		
1968–1974	Scott On...	various characters	
1969	According to Dora	various characters	
1969	Armchair Theatre	Angela	"What's a Mother For?"
1969	The Fossett Saga	Millie Goswick	
1969	The Jimmy Logan Show		
1969	The Undertakers	Housewife	Comedy short
1969–1970	The Best Things in Life	Mabel Pollard	
1969–1974	The Dick Emery Show	various characters	
1971	The Goodies	Penelope Fay	
1972	Tarbuck's Luck		
1973	Bless This House	Odette	
1973	Whoops Baghdad	Charisma	
1973	The Generation Game (New Year Special)	Elizabeth, Vampire's Wife	1 episode, with Jon Pertwee as Vampire
1974	The Morecambe and Wise Show	Muriel	
1974	The Pallisers	Mrs Bonteen	
1974–1979	Happy Ever After	June Fletcher	
1977	The Dick Emery Show	Jacqueline Clayton	"The Texas Connection"
1979	Cannon and Ball	The Manageress	
1979–1987	Terry and June	June Medford	
1980	Bernie		
1980	It Ain't Half Hot Mum	Captain Georgina Tollemache	
1980	The Dick Emery Christmas Show	Colette	"For Whom the Jingle Bells Toll"
1981	Mike Yarwood In Persons		
1984	Minder	Mrs Murdoch	
1984	Sharing Time	April	
1990	Cluedo	Mrs Blance White	
1992	The World of Peter Rabbit and Friends	Mrs Rabbit (voice)	"The Tale of Peter Rabbit and Benjamin Bunny"
1992	Terry and Julian	Mrs Wilson	
1992–2012	Absolutely Fabulous	Mother	
1996–2000	Brambly Hedge	Mrs Apple	
1997	All Rise for Julian Clary	Auntie Jane	
1997	Common As Muck	Irene	
1997	Family Money	Ivy	
1997	Wyrd Sisters	Nanny Ogg (voice)	
1997	The History of Tom Jones, A Foundling (Part 2)	Mrs Whitfield	
1998	Friends	The Housekeeper	
1998	Rex the Runt	Judge Pikelet	
1999	Days Like These	Grandma	
2000	Mirrorball	Dora Vermouth	
2000	The Secret	Mrs Birkstead	Catherine Cookson mini-series
2001–2010	Last of the Summer Wine	Nelly / Delphi	
2005	Midsomer Murders	Peggy Alder	"Midsomer Raspsody"
2005	The Royal	Esme	
2005–2007	Bob the Builder	Dot	UK dub
2006	Agatha Christie's Marple	Mrs Lancaster	
2007	New Tricks	Pru Sanders	
2007–2009	The Green Green Grass	Dora	
2008	Harley Street	Betty	
2009	Kingdom	Mrs Earnshaw	
2009–2010	Doctor Who	Minnie Hooper	"The End of Time"
2010	Coronation Street	May Penn	
2011	M.I. High	Beryl Bagshot	
2014	Jonathan Creek	Heidi Greeley / Laurel Greeley	
2014	Midsomer Murders	Molly Darnley	"The Flying Club"
2014	Topsy and Tim	Mrs Higley-Pigley	2 episodes
2014–2016	Boomers	Joan	
2015	You, Me and the Apocalypse	God	
2015–2016	EastEnders	Sister Ruth	

== Stage credits ==
Year	Production	Role	Venue / Company	Notes	Ref
1950	Ace of Clubs	Sunny Claire	Cambridge Theatre, London	Original London production of the Noël Coward musical	
1952	Love from Judy	Sally McBride	Saville Theatre, London	Original West End production	
1952	Women of Twilight	Rosie	Vaudeville Theatre, London	Stage play prior to the 1952 film version	
1982	Jack and the Beanstalk	Dame	Chichester Festival Theatre	Pantomime	
1985	Jack and the Beanstalk	Dame	Theatre Royal Bath	Pantomime	
1990	Babes in the Wood	Fairy	Ashcroft Theatre, Croydon	Pantomime	
1991	Babes in the Wood	Fairy	Theatre Royal Plymouth	Pantomime	
1992	Babes in the Wood	Fairy	New Theatre, Cardiff	Pantomime	
1994	Cinderella	Fairy Godmother	New Wimbledon Theatre	Pantomime	
2002	Bedroom Farce	Delia	Aldwych Theatre, London	Alan Ayckbourn revival	

== Books ==
- Whitfield, June (2000). ... and June Whitfield. Corgi Books. ISBN 0-593-04582-3. – (autobiography, with Christopher Douglas)
