= Sgt – Save My Boy! =

- Dad's Army episode
- Episode no.: Series 4 Episode 4
- Directed by: David Croft
- Story by: Jimmy Perry and David Croft
- Original air date: 16 October 1970
- Running time: 30 minutes

Episode chronology
← Previous "Boots, Boots, Boots"	Next → "Don't Fence Me In"

"Sgt – Save My Boy!" is the fourth episode of the fourth series of the British comedy series Dad's Army. It was originally transmitted on Friday 16 October 1970.

== Synopsis ==
During a blackout, Pike manages to get himself tangled up on barbed wire on the mined beach. As the tide begins to come in, the platoon undertakes a rescue operation.

== Plot ==
Mainwaring is giving a lecture on the progress of the war. He remarks that the Dunkirk evacuation meant that the orphans in the Harris Orphans' Holiday Home Hut on the coast had to leave as well, leaving the hut free for them to use as a patrol hut. They are quick to set up their equipment and now only have to wait for Private Pike with a flask of tea.

Eventually, Mrs Pike arrives at the hut with a tin of biscuits that Frank left at home, and is shocked when she learns that her son has yet to arrive, particularly as he left ten minutes before she did. She worries that he's been targeted by the Walmington prowler; Walker remarks that he may be the prowler. As they worry, Frazer, who's on guard duty, hears a cry for help outside. The platoon and Mrs Pike rush outside and see Frank tangled up in the barbed wire which runs along the beach. Walker assumes that Frank must have gotten lost and tried to get through a cut-in gap in the wire used for bathers. What is worse, the beach is a minefield.

Mainwaring tells Wilson to ring the engineers – but they're dealing with another emergency and won't be able to get there for another three hours, which will be too late because the tide is coming in. Walker suggests taking a boat, but Frazer squashes this idea by saying it would take too long to get there from the nearest dock, and that Pike would have drowned by the time they got back. With no alternative, they decide to negotiate a path through the minefield. Frazer has seen the mines laid, so he outlines the pattern to Mainwaring. Jones' section, save Godfrey who has mysteriously vanished, prod their way down the beach with Jones's bayonet.

On their travels, they discover a book on 'How to Lay a Mine Field', and a suspicious object with 'notgnimlaW ot emocleW' written on it. However, when turned the right way up, Walker discovers that it's a child's bucket which reads 'Welcome to Walmington!'. As they near Pike, Godfrey turns up next to him, with two pairs of waterwings and a blanket. It appears he followed the same route as Pike via the bathing gap. The men arrive at Pike's side, and Godfrey casually asks them whether they want a cup of tea.

Pike tells them to hurry, because he's got a piece of barbed wire sticking in his backside. They use a pair of cutters that Walker brought along to get him free, and start back, dragging the injured and moaning Pike on Godfrey's blanket. They stop when Jones prods something in the sand and look up to see a familiar pair of feet. It is ARP Warden Hodges ("What are you doin' there then, prayin' to Mecca?") with the engineer officer that laid the mines, who informs them that no mines were laid in their current position, and that the minefield ends 200 yards up the beach, meaning that they are not in any danger.

However, the engineer has to eat his words, when Jones produces a mine...

== Cast ==
- Arthur Lowe as Captain Mainwaring
- John Le Mesurier as Sergeant Wilson
- Clive Dunn as Lance Corporal Jones
- John Laurie as Private Frazer
- James Beck as Private Walker
- Arnold Ridley as Private Godfrey
- Ian Lavender as Private Pike
- Bill Pertwee as ARP Warden Hodges
- Janet Davies as Mrs Pike
- Michael Knowles as the Engineer Officer

== Notes ==
- The working title for this episode was 'The Mine'.
- According to dialogue between Mainwaring and Frazer, and remarks by Wilson in regard to the type of mine, this episode must be set after the German invasion of the Soviet Union on 22 June 1941.
- It is mentioned in this episode that Pike can't swim. He seems to have learned by the time of the events of "Asleep in the Deep", which shows him swimming across the flooded inner room in the pumping station, as well as diving underwater to retrieve a dropped spanner.
