= The Clitheroe Kid =

British radio comedy show (1957–1972)

- Genre: Sitcom
- Running time: 30 minutes
- Country of origin: United Kingdom
- Language: English
- Home station: BBC Home Service: North; BBC Light Programme; BBC Radio 2
- Syndicates: BBC Radio 4 Extra
- Starring: Jimmy Clitheroe; Peter Sinclair; Patricia Burke; Diana Day; Danny Ross; Tony Melody
- Created by: James Casey
- Written by: James Casey; Frank Roscoe; Ronnie Taylor
- Produced by: James Casey; Geoff Lawrence
- Recording studio: Hulme Hippodrome, Manchester, UK
- Original release: 24 April 1956 – 13 August 1972
- No. of series: 17
- No. of episodes: 290
- Website: www.bbc.co.uk/programmes/b00clb4p

The Clitheroe Kid is a BBC Radio comedy show featuring Northern comic Jimmy Clitheroe in the role of a cheeky schoolboy, who lived with his family at Lilac Avenue in an unnamed town in the North of England. The pilot show, pilot series, and 16 subsequent series, totalling 290 episodes in all, were originally broadcast between April 1956 and August 1972.

== Cast ==
In addition to Clitheroe himself, the show's stars included Peter Sinclair playing his Scottish granddad, Patricia Burke as his mother (in some early shows the part was played by Renée Houston), and Diana Day as his long-suffering sister, Susan (the sister, originally called Judith Clitheroe, was played in the earliest episodes by Judith Chalmers). Jimmy's father never appeared, and his absence was never addressed.

Oldham comedian Danny Ross played Alfie Hall, Susan's half-witted, tongue-tied boyfriend, who was often drawn into Jimmy's reckless schemes. He joined the show in 1960, replacing Susan's original boyfriend, played by Peter Goodwright.

Tony Melody played Mr (Horatio) Higginbottom (his first name was almost never used), normally known as Higgie, a 6 ft 4 in (1.93 m) taxi driver — Granddad's drinking buddy, and father of Jimmy's pal Ozzie. Higginbottom was always threatening to give Jimmy a good hiding for things he had done to Ozzie. Ozzie himself was rarely heard, save as an indistinct background voice in occasional early episodes (such as The Trouble with Higginbottom).

Several actors regularly played supporting roles in the show, including Leonard Williams (who played both Mr Craythorpe and Harry Whittle until 1962), Brian Trueman (who played Harry Whittle from 1966), and Rosalie Williams. Deryck Guyler, who had appeared in supporting roles in some early episodes, spent two years as a regular on the show, replacing Leonard Williams after the latter's death.

Famous guest stars included John Laurie, later best known as Private Fraser in Dad's Army, playing Grandad's Scottish brother, Angus, and Mollie Weir as Angus's wife (she was well known on radio from ITMA and Life with the Lyons), who appeared together on at least two occasions every year from 1962 until 1970.

The lost 1956 pilot episode guest starred Irene Handl and Robert Moreton, as Jimmy's aunt and uncle, with Anthea Askey as his girl cousin (playing the roles which would eventually evolve into his Mother, Grandfather and Sister), and Eddie Leslie.

In the 1957 pilot series, actors who appeared in guest roles included John Broadbent, Violet Carson, Fred Fairclough, Fred Ferris, Tom Harrison, Jack Howarth, Shirley King, Eddie Leslie, Bob Monkhouse, Herbert Smith, Jack Watson, and Patrick Wells.

Of the 290 broadcasts aired between 1956 and 1972, the BBC has retained 57 complete tapes (in the BBC Sound Archive and at BBC Manchester), together with edited BBC Transcription Service vinyl discs preserving a further 118 episodes, making 175 recordings in all. However, almost no complete episodes exist prior to 1st January 1970 (i.e. from the Pilot series and Series 1 to 13).

For the period 1956 to 1969, supplementing the edited Transcription Service discs, 58 episodes are currently known to exist as off air recordings made by listeners, many of variable sound quality, some of which are incomplete. An on-going project exists to locate and restore the approximately sixty entirely missing episodes, for which no recording of any sort is known, and to locate better quality and more complete recordings for the others.

== Production ==
Jimmy Clitheroe was 35 years old when he started playing the part on radio, but (in the variety theatres and, later, on television) he could pass as an 11-year-old boy because he had never grown physically beyond that age. Although in later years his lined face gave his real age away, this was not apparent on radio.

Created by James Casey in 1956, the show was produced in Manchester, originally by the North Region studios of the BBC Home Service. However, after two series were aired on North Region only, in 1959 the show was deemed sufficiently popular to be moved to the national transmitters of the BBC Light Programme.

The radio show was recorded in front of a studio audience, and there were frequently gales of laughter at Clitheroe's schoolboy humour, or at Alfie Hall's mangling of the English language as he tried to explain something, only to make it even less clear, as well as (to the mystification of home listeners) Hall's physical comedy, when he performed one of his trademark falls or other sight-gags.

Clitheroe always wore a schoolboy blazer and cap in the role, even at radio recordings, to maintain the illusion that he was 11-years-old. In the beginning (and, in fact, for many years), his high-pitched voice sounded astonishingly young. Real children never appeared on the show, as this would have shattered the carefully crafted illusion that he was a child (the show's popularity overseas arose, in part, because audiences unfamiliar with British showbusiness believed he really was a child). So he discussed his pal Ozzie, and his schoolboy friends in the Black Hand Gang (who would punish any member caught in the company of a girl), but the characters he spoke about were never actually heard themselves.

The show (apart from the 1957 pilot series) was written by James Casey and Frank Roscoe (occasionally by Ronnie Taylor, who had written the pilot series), and from 1958 was also produced by James Casey.

Following transmission, the BBC mainly preserved the series as 154 recordings on vinyl discs, sold overseas to Commonwealth radio stations by their commercial arm, BBC Enterprises (currently trading as BBC Worldwide and BBC Radio International). Altogether, the BBC retains 175 episodes, as a mixture of complete original recordings on magnetic tape and 25 minute edits on vinyl disc.

== Plot elements ==
Misunderstandings are the essence of the character-driven plots. Jimmy is depicted as frequently eavesdropping, or listening at keyholes, and as mishearing or misunderstanding what he overhears. Even when trying to do a good deed (as when he believes Grandad has stolen money from a local shop, which he is actually only minding for the bowling club), he usually messes up, with the assistance of the disaster-prone Alfie.

Another frequent scenario is some variation on one of Jimmy's many money-making schemes, intended to finance another visit to the sweetshop, or the purchase of a new pair of roller-skates, or somesuch, but which inevitably leads to disaster.

Jimmy's comedy technique involves much use of a popular style known (then as now) as insult humour. He refers to his teachers by comic nicknames, such as "Hum-ya Pete", "Whistling Willie" and "Tick-Tock Tillie". Mr Higginbottom is frequently likened to a rampaging grizzly-bear. Grandad's Scottish ancestry is endlessly mocked, with much talk of haggis and playing the bagpipes in the bath, and he is portrayed as a man who lives only for his beer. Jimmy's sister, Susan, is typically referred to as "Scraggy-neck", "Sparrow-legs", or occasionally "the Octopus" (for her clinches with boyfriend Alfie).

Alfie is endlessly mocked also — often countering by threatening to thump Jimmy. It is Alfie who Jimmy refers to in his catchphrase, "Don't some mothers 'ave 'em!?" Mr Higginbottom is also mocked whenever he appears: among other things, his house is said to be a rat-infested dump. However, Jimmy treads carefully in this, because the bad-tempered Higginbottom is known for his hair-trigger temper. Higginbottom's son, the much-maligned Ozzie, is a fat kid who Jimmy calls his best friend, while frequently thrashing him, mocking him, and involving him in his wild schemes.

The one person who escapes Jimmy's ready wit is his mother. In real life, his father had died and he was devoted to his widowed mother, so he would not stand for either his real mother, or his radio mother, being mocked. She is the calm centre around which the chaos revolves.

Susan occasionally turns the tables on her "little brother" (Jimmy was only 4 ft 2 in, 1.27 m), in return. In the episode Enough to Make a Kitten Laugh, Susan tricks Jimmy into buying back a lost kitten that he had sold to Ozzie, by offering a reward for it in the local newspaper (under an assumed name), but warns Mr Higginbottom that Jimmy wants it back, so that he has to pay double what Ozzie had paid him. When Jimmy discovers the trick, however, he gets the last laugh, selling the kitten (at a profit) to an employee at the newspaper, who then turns up at home to demand the reward she's offered.

After the end credits, Jimmy would usually deliver a short epilogue, addressed to the audience, tying up loose ends in the plot and, frequently, reporting that Grandad has given him the (expected) good spanking for the trouble he caused.
