= The Love Match =

1955 British film by David Paltenghi

- British quad poster
- Directed by: David Paltenghi
- Written by: Geoffrey Orme (screenplay); Glenn Melvyn (additional dialogue)
- Based on: play The Love Match by Glenn Melvyn
- Produced by: Maclean Rogers
- Starring: Arthur Askey
- Cinematography: Arthur Grant
- Edited by: Joseph Sterling
- Music by: Wilfred Burns
- Production companies: Beaconsfield Productions; Group 3
- Distributed by: British Lion Films
- Release date: February 1955
- Running time: 85 minutes
- Country: United Kingdom
- Language: English
- Box office: £174,991 (UK)

The Love Match is a 1955 British black and white comedy film directed by David Paltenghi and starring Arthur Askey, Glenn Melvyn, Thora Hird and Shirley Eaton. A football-mad railway engine driver and his fireman are desperate to get back in time to see a match. It was based on the 1953 play of the same name by Glenn Melvyn, one of the stars of the film. A TV spin-off series, Love and Kisses, appeared later in 1955.

== Cast ==
- Arthur Askey as Bill Brown
- Glenn Melvyn as Wally Binns
- Thora Hird as Sal Brown
- Shirley Eaton as Rose Brown
- James Kenney as Percy Brown
- Edward Chapman as Mr Longworth
- Danny Ross as Alf Hall
- Robb Wilton as Mr Muddlecombe
- Anthea Askey as Vera
- Patricia Hayes as Emma Binns
- Iris Vandeleur as Mrs Entwhistle
- William Franklyn as Arthur Ford
- Leonard Williams as aggressive man
- Peter Swanwick as Mr Hall
- Dorothy Blythe as Waitress
- Reginald Hearne as Police Constable Wilfred
- Maurice Kaufmann as Harry Longworth
- Janet Davies as motorist

== Production ==
The film was an early appearance from Shirley Eaton.

== Release ==
=== Box Office ===
According to the National Film Finance Corporation, the film made a comfortable profit. According to Kinematograph Weekly it was a "money maker" at the British box office in 1955.

The reported profit was £34,000.

=== Critical reception ===
In British Sound Films: The Studio Years 1928–1959 David Quinlan rated the film as "good", writing: "Good, noisy north country comedy. Old jokes notch remarkably high scoring rate."

The Radio Times Guide to Films gave the film 3/5 stars, writing: "Although this is an admirable enough comedy, it is also one of those unforgivably patronising pictures that bourgeois British film makers believed presented an authentic picture of working-class life. Arthur Askey stars as a football crazy railway employee whose passion for a team of no-hopers lands him in all sorts of trouble. Struggling against a shortage of genuinely funny situations, the cast does well to keep the action alive. The highlight is Askey's heckling of the referee, a wonderful moment of football hooliganism."

TV Guide noted a "highly enjoyable farce."

Britmovie called it a "boisterous Lancashire comedy with a rapid succession of old jokes."

== See also ==
- List of association football films
