= Mirrorball (TV pilot) =

- Genre: Sitcom; TV pilot
- Created by: Jennifer Saunders
- Written by: Jennifer Saunders
- Directed by: Adrian Edmondson
- Starring: Jennifer Saunders; Joanna Lumley; Julia Sawalha; June Whitfield; Jane Horrocks
- Opening theme: No More Heroes performed by Hugh Cornwell
- Country of origin: United Kingdom
- Original language: English
- No. of episodes: 1

Production
- Producer: Jon Plowman
- Editor: Chris Wadsworth
- Camera setup: Video
- Running time: 29 minutes
- Production company: BBC Productions

Original release
- Network: BBC One
- Release: 22 December 2000

Related
- Absolutely Fabulous

Mirrorball was a sitcom pilot in the United Kingdom directed by Adrian Edmondson and written by Jennifer Saunders. It originally aired on 22 December 2000.

All of the main cast members (and several supporting cast members) from the popular series Absolutely Fabulous were also cast in this show, although the plot and characters were completely different. It was produced as a pilot episode for what Saunders intended to be a new show. Mirrorball ended up inspiring Saunders to revive Absolutely Fabulous in 2001, and a full series was never produced.

== Plot synopsis ==
The show centers around Vivienne Keill (Saunders) and Jackie Riviera (Joanna Lumley), two ageing stage actresses who live in vertically adjacent flats. The two are of questionable talent, and their careers seem to be at a standstill. During the course of the pilot, Vivienne has the opportunity to be cast in a new show but delivers a horrifying rendition of the standard "Send in the Clowns", thanks in part to Jackie's off-kilter advice.

Julia Sawalha plays Freda Keill, Vivienne's younger sister and a more serious (and successful) actress. Jane Horrocks plays Yitta Hilberstam, a vicious Icelandic actress/waitress. June Whitfield appears as Dora Vermouth, a former vaudeville actress who spends most of her time intoxicated at the local pub and is showing slight signs of dementia. Harriet Thorpe plays Cat Rogers, an actress who is busy understudying multiple roles.

== Cast ==
Main

- Jennifer Saunders as Vivienne Keill
- Joanna Lumley as Jackie Riviera
- Julia Sawalha as Freda Keill
- Jane Horrocks as Yitta Hilberstam
- Harriet Thorpe as Cat Rogers
- Tim Wylton as Brice Michaels
- June Whitfield as Dora Vermouth

Guest

- Matthew Francis as Theatre Producer
- Sean Chapman as Mark
- Alan Corser as Johnny
- Andy Clarkson as Postman
- Rupert Bates as Gordon
- Nigel Ellacott as Jackie's Fan 1
- Peter Robbins as Jackie's Fan 2
- George Hall as Pianist
- Bonnie Langford as herself

== Reception ==
The episode received a viewing figure of 6,690,000 and ranked 20th place during the week it was broadcast on BBC One.

== Availability ==
Mirrorball is available as an "extra" on the DVD edition of Absolutely Fabulous series 4.
