= Absent Friends (Dad's Army) =

- Dad's Army episode
- Episode no.: Series 4 Episode 6
- Directed by: David Croft
- Story by: Jimmy Perry and David Croft
- Original air date: 30 October 1970
- Running time: 30 minutes

Episode chronology
← Previous "Don't Fence Me In"	Next → "Put That Light Out!"

"Absent Friends" is the sixth episode of the fourth series of the British comedy series Dad's Army. It was originally transmitted on 30 October 1970.

== Synopsis ==
Taking advantage of Captain Mainwaring's absence, the platoon take part in a pub darts match against the ARP wardens.

== Plot ==
Wilson is singing to himself in Mainwaring's office. Suddenly, Mainwaring enters, which is a shock to Wilson, as Mainwaring had gone to a Lodge meeting in London for the weekend. Wilson asks if it was cancelled, but Mainwaring admits he did not go after all as his wife, Elizabeth, does not like being in the house on her own during the air raids. He offers to inspect the men, but Wilson is a bit cagey.

Pike enters in civilian clothing. He admits that his mother put his uniform in the wash tub. Mainwaring is annoyed but agrees to let it pass. He tells Wilson to ask Jones to call the roll, which he does. However, most of them are not there, and only Jones and Pike are on parade. Mainwaring is unimpressed and asks Wilson where his men are. Wilson admits they are all in the pub, playing darts against Hodges' wardens. Mainwaring agrees to turn a blind eye, as long as Wilson brings the men back straight away.

Meanwhile, at the match, things are not going well for the Home Guard. The wardens are clearly winning. Suddenly, Mrs Pike enters and Hodges offers her a drink. While he is at the bar, Wilson arrives and tries to persuade the men to return. He then spots Mrs Pike and wonders what she is doing there. He is accidentally bumped by Hodges, who quickly makes his excuses and scurries off. Wilson leaves in a daze.

Mainwaring receives a phone call from Elizabeth, asking him to get her some off ration oxtail for him. He tries to explain that it is against his principles, but Elizabeth refuses to listen. Mainwaring calls Jones into the office to ask him about the oxtail, and his wife's craving for it, but crossed wires result in Jones believing he will help to deliver Elizabeth's child.

Mainwaring is annoyed when Wilson returns saying he thinks he has brought the men back, but this is not true. He and Jones will go with Wilson back to the pub and if they fail to bring the men back, Wilson can consider himself under open arrest.

At the match, things are going from bad to worse for the platoon. Things are made worse when Mainwaring, Wilson and Jones enter. Mainwaring tries to persuade the men to return to the hall, with little success. Wilson also tries to persuade Mrs Pike to leave, but to no avail. Mainwaring leaves, very hurt and ashamed of his men. As they leave, Godfrey confides in Walker and Frazer that he does not think they have done the right thing, and in spite of Frazer's insults and admonitions for him to stay, decides to leave. An angry Frazer and a concerned Walker discuss the situation, with Walker seemingly thinking of leaving as well, but Hodges persuades him to stay and finish the game.

Back at the church hall, Mainwaring confides in Wilson that the parade is the highlight of his day. While eating his tea, he can feel excitement mounting inside him, but not anymore. Wilson is distracted by Mrs Pike's interest in Hodges and does not listen. They receive a phone call from the police, informing that an Irish Republican Army suspect has been spotted in Ivy Crescent. While this would normally be a matter for the police, the suspect is believed to be armed, and so the Home Guard is being dispatched to assist the police in capturing the suspect.

They meet the lone police constable outside the house of the suspect and prepare to grab him. However, the man they grab claims to be the suspect's twin brother. Mainwaring is not convinced and marches him back to the church hall.

The ARP Wardens win the darts match, and Walker is reluctant to stay any longer. Just as Hodges and his wardens are preparing to collect on the beer that is owed them, the bartender informs everyone that they have run out of beer (much to Frazer's delight, as he insists gambling debts have to be paid "on the spot, or not at all"). Walker tells everyone else that he is going back to the church hall, as he does not like seeing Mainwaring get upset. Hodges decides to come too as he wants to lord his team's victory over Mainwaring, and brings Mrs Pike along with him.

Not long after the small group return with the suspect, Godfrey returns to the hall, unbeknownst to the men, and falls asleep. Suddenly, three angry Irishmen arrive, with the largest one grabbing Godfrey by the collar, and demanding to know where Mainwaring has taken his brother. Godfrey bluffs the three men into believing that he and Mainwaring are in the dressing room.

Godfrey informs Mainwaring of the predicament, which causes the suspect to call out for his brother (and which prompts Jones to threaten him with his bayonet). Mainwaring orders Pike to fetch the rest of the men. The Verger arrives in a panic, carrying an empty bottle, and informs Mainwaring that he has locked the three men in the church hall, before devolving into his usual complaints about Mainwaring's "misuse" of church property, which in turn prompts Jones to call him a "troublemaker". As the two argue, the Irish suspect replies that they are both troublemakers, which causes the Verger to shut him up by smashing the empty bottle over his head.

The rest of the platoon return, and rush to attack the Irishmen, but with little success. As Hodges and Mrs Pike arrive, Pike enters with a bleeding lip, while Jones complains that they have taken his bayonet, and a frantic Mrs Pike persuades Wilson to "sort them out". In response, Wilson asks Jones to open the door for him, and exits the office into the church hall, where the three Irishmen are waiting. Listening to the fight through the door, a horrified Mainwaring and Jones think that Wilson is receiving a terrible beating at the hands of the Irishmen. They are therefore shocked when Wilson returns after a few moments, looking none the worse for wear apart from some bruised knuckles, having defeated all three IRA members single-handedly. Hodges is terrified and leaves, and Mrs Pike eagerly tells Wilson they should have an early night in.

Sometime later, Mainwaring forgives the men for their lapse in behaviour and confirms to the platoon that Jones was wrong about Mrs Mainwaring. They "have never been blessed in that way but in every other way it has been a most happy marriage, in fact, almost blissful".

== Cast ==
- Arthur Lowe as Captain Mainwaring
- John Le Mesurier as Sergeant Wilson
- Clive Dunn as Lance Corporal Jones
- John Laurie as Private Frazer
- James Beck as Private Walker
- Arnold Ridley as Private Godfrey
- Ian Lavender as Private Pike
- Bill Pertwee as ARP Warden Hodges
- Janet Davies as Mrs Pike
- Edward Sinclair as Verger
- J. G. Devlin as Regan
- Arthur English as Policeman
- Patrick Connor as Seamus
- Verne Morgan as Landlord
- Michael Lomax as 2nd ARP Warden

== Notes ==
- The appearance of Patrick Regan, the suspected IRA member, and his colleagues was one of the few occasions in Dad's Army when the platoon was presented with a threat other than the Germans.
- In comparison to more frequent reruns of other episodes in the series, after an initial repeat in 1971, the episode was not screened again until November 1992, and then not again until May 2012. It has been speculated that the presence of the IRA suspect is the reason for this. In the subsequent radio adaptation in April 1976, the IRA suspect is replaced with an escaped convict.
