= Don't Forget the Diver =

- Dad's Army episode
- Episode no.: Series 4 Episode 2
- Directed by: Harold Snoad
- Story by: Jimmy Perry and David Croft
- Original air date: 2 October 1970
- Running time: 30 minutes

Episode chronology
← Previous "The Big Parade"	Next → "Boots, Boots, Boots"

"Don't Forget the Diver" is the second episode of the fourth series of the British comedy series Dad's Army. It was originally transmitted on 2 October 1970.

== Synopsis ==
On an exercise, the Walmington-on-Sea platoon come up with an ingenious plan to capture the windmill defended by the Eastgate platoon.

== Plot ==
Captain Square and his two NCOs are having a drink in the local pub. Square tells the landlord the story of when he was with Lawrence of Arabia, fighting the Turks. He remarks that his golden watch saved him from dehydration; he left it in his mouth for three days! He demonstrates this to the landlord just as Mainwaring and Wilson enter. Mainwaring is curious, and Wilson quips that he is "watching his drink". Square reminds Mainwaring of the big exercise that coming Sunday, and Square's sergeant remarks that all Home Guard platoons in the area are taking part.

The following parade, the platoon meets up to discuss tactics. However, the Verger is snooping around, taking notes to deliver to Captain Square because he is fed up with the way the Walmington platoon treat him. The Eastgate platoon will be defending a windmill, and the Walmington platoon have to find a way of planting a dummy bomb in the windmill without being spotted. Jones suggests a tunnel, but that is soon dismissed. Wilson suggests an idea from a Shakespeare play he once saw, where the king dressed his troops up in bushes so they could attack the offending castle. Mainwaring thinks this is a good idea.

Walker suggests a man in a diving suit to push a dummy log along the river to a convenient spot, and then the "log" can waddle over to the windmill and plant the bomb. Frazer announces that he has inherited a diving suit from a late friend of his, Wally Stewart, who died from the "dreaded bends" due to being pulled up too quickly on his last voyage. It is eventually decided that Jones will be inside the dummy log and Frazer, in the diving suit, will push Jones along the river until he is level with the windmill, at which point he will give a tug on his lifeline. This will be the signal to announce the first diversion, which will be initiated by Walker and Wilson, by Mainwaring's bird warbler. The second diversion will be initiated by Godfrey and Walker. When Jones reaches the windmill, he will climb out of the log and plant the "bomb". As they are practicing, ARP Warden Hodges arrives and finds the platoon's plan ridiculous (especially Jones' imitations of the gurgling water), and fetches the 2nd ARP Warden, who asks, "Are they on our side?".

On the day of the exercise, the Verger is still snooping from the church graveyard, using a hidden telephone to contact Square. Frazer and Jones proceed to move down the river, and Mainwaring launches the first diversion: Wilson and Walker have fifteen rifles attached to poles and are marching up and down behind a wall. The Verger reports this to Square, who does not believe him and thinks the platoon are drilling. Frazer pushes Jones' dummy log onto the bank, but he cannot get the flap open, and falls back in the river. Although he manages to get out again, and head for the windmill, he is waylaid by a playful sheepdog. However, the Eastgate platoon are distracted by Mainwaring's second diversion: Walker and Godfrey have put tin helmets on a flock of sheep and have taken them up to the mill. The Verger and Square are fooled into believing that the platoon is dressed up as sheep with tin helmets on.

Jones eventually reaches the windmill and proceeds to plant the "bomb". However, it is still attached to him, so when Square throws the bomb back, Jones gets caught up in the sails. Mainwaring proceeds to accept their surrender, but Square refuses. They argue over who the victor is and notice that the sails are moving, with Jones on them. Eventually, after Mainwaring fails to stop the windmill, Jones jumps off and lands in the river.

== Cast ==
- Arthur Lowe as Captain Mainwaring
- John Le Mesurier as Sergeant Wilson
- Clive Dunn as Lance Corporal Jones
- John Laurie as Private Frazer
- James Beck as Private Walker
- Arnold Ridley as Private Godfrey
- Ian Lavender as Private Pike
- Bill Pertwee as ARP Warden Hodges
- Edward Sinclair as The Verger
- Frank Williams as The Vicar
- Geoffrey Lumsden as Captain Square
- Robert Raglan as HG Sergeant
- Colin Bean as Private Sponge
- Don Estelle as Gerald, the 2nd ARP Warden
- Verne Morgan as Landlord

== Notes ==
1. The windmill sails sequence, filmed at Drinkstone, Suffolk, pays tribute to the Will Hay film Oh, Mr Porter! (1937).
2. The episode title pays homage to the wartime catchphrase of Tommy Handley in the ITMA radio series, "Don't forget the diver sir; do not forget the diver" about the character Deepend Dan.
3. The episode sees the first appearance of Robert Raglan as Captain Square's Sergeant. He would later return in a semi-regular role as the "Colonel".
4. Mainwaring says "stupid boy" three times in this episode, once where Pike stands on the air pipe connected to Frazer's diving suit during a rehearsal for the exercise, again when he nearly gets caught on Frazer's lifeline and air pipe when Pike accidentally holds them at waist height during the rehearsal, and once more when Pike has difficulty cutting through a wire fence during the actual exercise.

== Radio episode ==
"Don’t Forget the Diver" is the 22nd adapted radio episode, and the first of the second radio series (after the Christmas special episode, "Present Arms"), of Dad's Army. It has been regularly rebroadcast on BBC Radio 4 Extra or its predecessors.

=== Synopsis ===
The synopsis remains virtually unchanged from the TV episode, although there are a few minor changes in terms of actions performed by certain characters.

=== Notes ===
The main change from the original TV episode is that a watermill is substituted for the windmill. There is no scene in the radio episode in the pub or involving Square's survival trick with his pocket-watch.

=== Cast ===
Only two guest actors appeared in this radio episode, namely Edward Sinclair as The Verger and the actor who played Square's sergeant.
