= Make Mine a Million =

1959 British film by Lance Comfort

- British theatrical poster
- Directed by: Lance Comfort
- Written by: Arthur Askey; Peter Blackmore; Jack Francis; Talbot Rothwell
- Produced by: John Baxter; Barbara K. Emary
- Starring: Arthur Askey; Dermot Walsh; Sid James; Olga Lindo
- Cinematography: Arthur Grant
- Edited by: Peter Pitt
- Music by: Stanley Black
- Production company: Elstree Independent Films
- Distributed by: British Lion Film Corporation
- Release date: 24 February 1959
- Running time: 81 minutes
- Country: United Kingdom
- Language: English

Make Mine a Million is a 1959 British comedy film directed by Lance Comfort, starring Arthur Askey, Sid James and Bernard Cribbins. It was written by Askey, Peter Blackmore, Jack Francis and Talbot Rothwell, and distributed by British Lion. The film parodies the perceived stuffiness of the 1950s BBC and the effect of television advertising in the era.

== Plot ==
Arthur Ashton (a parody of Arthur Askey) is a makeup man working for National Television (a parody of the BBC). During a visit to the local launderette, he meets Sid Gibson, a shady pedlar who is trying to flog Bonko, a brand of washing powder in the shape of a pill. The man cannot afford to advertise on TV, but wishes to do so. The fairly clueless Arthur agrees to help him, and they manage to plug an advert for Bonko on National Television by interrupting the live feed.

This causes quite a stir amongst the national television heads, who have Arthur fired. However, the advert proves extremely popular and demand for the product soars.

After repeating the stunt at Ascot Races, Sid, realising that this is potentially a huge moneymaker, does a deal with an advertising executive and, with Arthur's help, they plug cake mix at the Edinburgh Tattoo. Next Arthur materialises on stage during a production of Swan Lake.

After a narrow escape, Arthur wants to quit, but Sid persuades him to do one final job – interrupting a press conference between the British prime minister and the American president. On the way, the Post Office van they are using is hijacked by criminals. Arthur, who is in the back of the van, contacts the police using his broadcast system, to thwart the robbery, leading to the final barnyard showdown. In the end, Arthur, now a hero and celebrity, gets his own TV show, brokered by Sid.

== Cast ==
- Arthur Askey as Arthur Ashton
- Sid James as Sid Gibson
- Dermot Walsh as Martin Russell
- Olga Lindo as Mrs. Burgess
- Clive Morton as Director General
- Sally Barnes as Sally
- George Margo as assistant
- Lionel Murton as commercial TV director
- Bernard Cribbins as Jack
- Kenneth Connor as anxious husband
- Barbara Windsor as switchboard operator
- Martin Benson as Chairman
- David Nettheim as Professor
- Bruce Seton as Superintendent James
- Tommy Trinder as himself
- Dickie Henderson as himself
- Evelyn Laye as herself
- Dennis Lotis as himself
- Anthea Askey as herself
- Raymond Glendenning as himself
- Patricia Bredin as herself
- Leonard Weir as himself
- Sabrina as herself
- Gillian Lynne as herself
- Peter Noble as himself, as TV Host
- Prince Monolulu as himself
- Leigh Madison as Diana
- Sam Kydd as mail van robber
- Edwin Richfield as plainclothes oliceman
- Bill Shine as Outside Broadcast producer
- Gordon Jackson as leader of the pipe band

== Production ==
Filming began on 7 July 1958 at Shepperton Studios near London with sets designed by the art director Denis Wreford. It was known during filming as Look Before You Laugh.

== Critical reception ==
Monthly Film Bulletin said "Sid James and Arthur Askey perform their familiar acts surrounded by numerous stars from films and television. The result is wholesome family entertainment set firmly in the tradition of British pantomime. The tone of the comedy is generally light, but put over effectively enough, with some gentle satire on the BBC and Commercial TV Companies."

The Radio Times Guide to Films gave the film 3/5 stars, writing: "Diminutive funster Arthur Askey had often spoofed the BBC on radio and in films and, when he made the transition from the BBC to ITV (in 1956), he likewise took the rise out of his new employers. In this satire on TV advertising, Arthur Askey is a make-up man who falls under the influence of dodgy promoter Sidney James and becomes the star of soap powder commercials. A pacey romp."

In British Sound Films: The Studio Years 1928–1959 David Quinlan rated the film as "average", writing: "Enjoyable broad comedy, with good-natured performances."
