= The Phantom Gunslinger =

1970 Mexican film by Albert Zugsmith

- Directed by: Albert Zugsmith
- Produced by: Blair Robertson; Albert Zugsmith
- Starring: Troy Donahue; Sabrina
- Cinematography: Gabriel Figueroa
- Edited by: Jorge Busto
- Production companies: Famous Players International; Producciones Rosas Priego; Sagitario Films
- Release date: 1970
- Running time: 100 mins
- Countries: Mexico; United States

The Phantom Gunslinger is a 1970 Mexican-American Western film directed by Albert Zugsmith. The film stars Troy Donahue, Sabrina, Elizabeth Campbell, Emilio Fernández, Germán Robles, and Pedro Armendáriz Jr.

A digitally restored version of The Phantom Gunslinger was released in December 2013.

== Plot ==
The town of Tucca Flats is invaded by a gang of bandits, including Algernon, Big Sam, and Cookie. The sheriff leaves town, naming a trainee preacher, Phil, as his successor. Bill does not know how to use a gun, and has to learn.

== Cast ==
- Troy Donahue as Phil Phillips
- Sabrina as Margie
- Elizabeth Campbell as Cookie
- Emilio Fernández as Sheriff
- Carlos Rivas as Sam
- Germán Robles as The Devil
- Pedro Armendáriz Jr. as Algernon

== Production ==
The film was shot in March 1967 in Churubusco Studios in Mexico City.

It was not released until 1970.

== See also ==
- List of American films of 1970
