= Danny Ross (comedian) =

British comedian (1930–1976)

Publicity photo of Danny Ross

Ronald Crabtree (30 April 1930 – 2 February 1976), known by his stage name Danny Ross, was a British comedian best remembered for his role alongside Jimmy Clitheroe in the long running BBC Radio comedy show The Clitheroe Kid (1957–1973).

== Early life ==
Danny Ross was born in Oldham, Lancashire, England on 30 April 1930, the only son of John William Crabtree (1895–1964), a cotton spinner, and his wife, Martha Jane (née Grady, 23 August 1895 – 1979).

== Career ==
In The Clitheroe Kid, Ross played the part of Alfie Hall, the dim-witted, mismatched boyfriend of Jimmy's posh sister Susan (Diana Day). Alfie Hall was a name Ross had used prior to The Clitheroe Kid, including during a television series in 1956 entitled I'm Not Bothered... which followed the exploits of milkman Alf Hall and his stuttering mate Wally Binns (Glenn Melvyn). The phrase "I'm not bothered..." was occasionally used by Ross in The Clitheroe Kid as a catchphrase, in indecisive (but not unfriendly) responses when given a decision by girlfriend Susan.

Ross had made his reputation in comedy by starring alongside Arthur Askey and Glenn Melvyn in The Love Match, a hit stage comedy presented for a summer season at the Grand Theatre, Blackpool, in 1953, that led to the spin-off TV series Love and Kisses. He had also starred in the lead role in the revival of the stage musical Zip Goes a Million, and later made a pop record of "The Old Bazaar in Cairo".

== Personal life and death ==
Ross was taken ill on New Year's Day 1976, en route to London with his manager to arrange a new show. He died of a heart attack at Blackpool's Victoria Hospital, on 2 February 1976, at the age of 45.

== Filmography ==
- Just Jimmy (TV series) (ABC-tv) as Cousin Danny (51 episodes, 1964–1968)
- Friends and Neighbours (1959) as Sebastian Green
- The Anne Shelton Show (1 episode, 1959)
  - Episode dated 19 January 1959 (1959) TV episode
- Living It Up as Danny, props boy (2 episodes, 1957–1958)
  - Episode No.2.1 (1958) TV episode as Danny, props boy
  - Episode No.1.3 (1957) TV episode as Danny, props boy
- I'm Not Bothered (TV series) as Alf Hall (7 episodes, 1956)
  - Episode No.1.26 (1956) TV episode as Alf Hall
  - Episode No.1.10 (1956) TV episode as Alf Hall
  - Episode No.1.9 (1956) TV episode as Alf Hall
  - Episode No.1.8 (1956) TV episode as Alf Hall
  - Episode No.1.7 (1956) TV episode as Alf Hall
- Ramsbottom Rides Again (1956) as Danny
- Love and Kisses as Alf Hall (5 episodes, 1955)
  - Episode No.1.1 (1955) TV episode as Alf Hall
  - Episode No.1.2 (1955) TV episode as Alf Hall
  - "Bill Goes on the Stage" (1955) TV episode as Alf Hall
  - "Bill Mixes More Trouble" (1955) TV episode as Alf Hall
  - "Bill's Bright Ideas" (1955) TV episode .... Alf Hall
- The Love Match (1955) as Alf Hall
