= Eli Woods =

English comedian and comic actor (1923–2014)

- Born: John Casey; 11 January 1923; Stockton-on-Tees, County Durham, England
- Died: 1 May 2014 (aged 91); Stockton-on-Tees, County Durham, England
- Other names: Jack Casey; Bretton Woods
- Occupation(s): Comedian and comic actor
- Known for: Collaborations with Jimmy James and others

Eli Woods (born John Casey; 11 January 1923 – 1 May 2014) was an English comedian and comic actor, born in Stockton-on-Tees, County Durham, possibly best known for his work with stage comedian Jimmy James (in reality his uncle), and particularly for his part in the famous 'elephant-in-the-box' routine. He made his first professional appearance on the stage of the Hippodrome Theatre in Aldershot in Hampshire.

Jimmy James developed his famous act over many years, but from the first it required two 'stooges'. One was John "Jack" Casey—tall and stick-thin, with a bony face and a stammering delivery—who originally appeared as "Bretton Woods" (named after the location of the famous 1944 United Nations monetary and financial Conference), and only later redubbed as "Eli" Woods (often "Our Eli"). The other stooge, 'Hutton Conyers' would be played either by members of the Casey family - including, on occasion, James Casey - or (from 1956 to 1959) by Roy Castle. Much later, Woods was in the support cast of Castles in the Air, a comedy series on BBC Radio 2.

During the late 1970s and early 1980s, Woods featured in three Eddie Braben scripted comedy shows: The Worst Show on the Wireless (20 episodes, 1973 -75) The Show With Ten Legs (26 episodes, 1978–80) and The Show with No Name (13 episodes, 1982–84). Both shows harked back to the music hall tradition. As a performer, Woods turned his lifelong stutter to his advantage, using it to comic effect in many contexts. For many years active as a stage and radio performer, Woods also appeared in a number of television comedies, as well as playing small parts in a variety of films including A Private Function released in 1984.

The apex of his career (in terms of recognition) was appearing in a comedy sketch (the elephant in a box routine) with James Casey and Roy Castle in the 1982 Royal Variety Performance in which they also sing Kisses Sweeter than Wine.

Although Woods's birth name was John Casey, he was better known to his family as Jack. He died at home in Stockton-on-Tees in the early hours of Thursday 1 May 2014, aged 91.

== Selected filmography ==
- Over the Garden Wall (1950)
