= Leonard Williams (actor) =

British actor (1917–1962)

Leonard Williams (born West Derby, Liverpool, Lancashire 1914, died London 15 November 1962) was an English actor. He was best known for playing Sergeant Percy Twentyman on the police television series Z-Cars. According to Brian Blessed he was "the joker of the cast", who spent his time on set making his colleagues laugh.

Williams also played the characters of Theodore Craythorpe and Harry Whittle in the BBC radio comedy series The Clitheroe Kid. He also made regular appearances opposite Harry Worth on television. He died of a heart attack at his flat in Lexham Gardens, Kensington. He was father to two children, Leon and Marianne, and husband to Imelda. He was the nephew of actor George Carney.

== Everton and Johnny Todd ==
Just five days prior to his death, Williams had attended Everton's 5-0 victory over Blackpool in the First Division at Goodison Park. Noting that Williams was at the ground, the club played Johnny Todd, the Z Cars TV Theme over the public address before the game. After William's death, the club played it again at the next home game in tribute to him. Again the Merseysiders won comfortably, 3-0 against Sheffield United. When Everton's next home game, where Johnny Todd wasn't played, ended in a draw, fans began writing to the club stating that the tune was a lucky omen and should be reinstated. Everton did so, the team won again and went on end a twenty-four year wait to be crowned League Champions. The tune has since been adopted as the official anthem of the club.

== Selected filmography ==
- The Magnet (1950)
- Orders Are Orders (1954)
- Make Me an Offer (1954)
- The Passing Stranger (1954)
- The Love Match (1955)
- Ramsbottom Rides Again (1955)
- Timeslip (1955)
- Behind the Headlines (1956)
- The Gay Dog (1959)
