= Love and Kisses (TV series) =

1955 British TV sitcom

- Genre: Sitcom
- Starring: Arthur Askey; Lally Bowers; Anthea Askey; Ian Gardiner; Glenn Melvyn; Barbara Miller; Danny Ross
- Country of origin: United Kingdom
- No. of series: 1
- No. of episodes: 5

Production
- Running time: 30 minutes
- Production company: Associated-Rediffusion

Original release
- Network: ITV
- Release: 4 November – 2 December 1955

Love and Kisses is a black-and-white British sitcom that aired on ITV in 1955. It was written by Glenn Melvyn, who also starred in it. It was made for the ITV network by Associated-Rediffusion and was a spin-off series from the film The Love Match (1955) which was also written by and starred Melvyn.

== Cast ==
- Arthur Askey as Bill Brown
- Lally Bowers as Sal Brown
- Anthea Askey as Rose Brown
- Ian Gardiner as Percy Brown
- Glenn Melvyn as Wally Binns
- Barbara Miller as Emma Binns
- Danny Ross as Alf Hall
- Bernard Graham as Terence Steel
- Leonard Williams as Mr Seymour
- Margaret Anderson as Pam

== Plot ==
Bill Brown is a former engine driver who is now a landlord. His wife is Sal and he has two children, Rose and Percy. His regulars are Alf Hall, a milkman, and Wally Binns, who has a stammer. Askey appears at the beginning and end of each episode.

== Episodes ==
1. Episode One (4 November 1955)
2. Episode Two (11 November 1955)
3. Episode Three (18 November 1955)
4. Episode Four (25 November 1955)
5. Episode Five (2 December 1955)

The last two episodes are still missing from ITV's archive, but the other three remain intact.

== Composite edition ==
The whole series was cut down for one 2 hour programme, and screened in the North of England on 23 December 1956 by ABC.

== See also ==
- Gert and Daisy as 1959 ITV sitcom
