= Mild and Bitter =

1936 book by British humorist A. P. Herbert

Mild and Bitter is a 1936 book by British humorist A. P. Herbert. It consists mainly of items first published in Punch; but also includes two first published in the Evening Standard and the Strand Magazine, and some items performed in C. B. Cochran's revue Streamline.

The book comprises 57 articles and poems. Most are humorous; but one is a first-hand account of the vote counting process under the single transferable vote system during the author's election as Member of Parliament for Oxford University in 1935.

The title alludes to a British alcoholic drink consisting of equal parts of mild ale and bitter beer, also called AB, M-and-B or half-and-half.
