= Reginald Molehusband =

British character in public service announcements

Reginald Molehusband was a fictional character who starred in a public information film commissioned by the Central Office of Information and shown on British TV during the 1960s. The role of Molehusband was played by Ian Gardiner. No copy of the film is known to still exist.

Molehusband was depicted as the country's worst driver when it came to parallel-parking his Austin 1100 car. The film concluded with Reginald finally able to park the car successfully and so demonstrate the technique for the benefit of viewers.

The script reads:

"This is the story of Reginald Molehusband, married, two children, whose reverse parking was a public danger. People came from miles just to see it. Bets were laid on his performance. What he managed to miss at the back, he was sure to make up for at the front. Bus drivers and taxis changed their routes to avoid him. Until the day that Reginald Molehusband did it right. Not too close, far enough forward... come on Reggie... and reverse in slowly... come on.... and watching traffic... and park perfectly! Well done Reginald Molehusband, the safest parker in town."

The name of Reginald Molehusband entered common parlance in the United Kingdom to refer to any inexpert or timid driver, and "Well done, Reginald" became a humorous catchphrase uttered in mock congratulation to someone successfully completing a modest task.

Because the original film was lost, a new version was made by the BBC in 2006, again starring Gardiner, who played Reginald in the original film. A new voiceover was recorded, despite a recording of the original narration existing.
