= Don't Fence Me In (Dad's Army) =

- Dad's Army episode
- Episode no.: Series 4 Episode 5
- Directed by: David Croft
- Story by: Jimmy Perry and David Croft
- Original air date: 23 October 1970
- Running time: 30 minutes

Episode chronology
← Previous "Sgt – Save My Boy!"	Next → "Absent Friends"

"Don't Fence Me In" is the fifth episode of the fourth series of the British comedy series Dad's Army. It was originally transmitted on 23 October 1970.

== Synopsis ==
When the platoon is detailed to replace regular troops guarding the local prisoner of war camp, Private Walker spies a source for cheap labour.

== Plot ==
Captain Mainwaring is on the phone to GHQ, and it is clear he is not happy. He does not think his men will appreciate being taken off active duty for the next two weekends to relieve the troops at an Italian POW camp, and he is quite right. As they march towards the camp, Mainwaring reminds them to set a good example by looking nice and smart.

However, when they arrive, they find no one there. They interrogate a POW, but they have no luck until he opens the front gate. Mainwaring and Sergeant Wilson arrive at the main hut, and confront the Italian general Monteverdi lounging in a wooden chair. He tells them that the regular troops have already left on "end week" leave, and he has placed himself in charge. Mainwaring is appalled by this. He is also confused as to why the Italians, as POWs, are not enemies to the British. Monteverdi tells him that they have allied themselves to the British and admits that he himself surrendered to them back in the African desert.

Corporal Jones' section come into the hut, and Monteverdi immediately recognises Walker and hugs and kisses him in the traditional continental greeting. Mainwaring is perturbed by this, but Walker denies all knowledge of ever meeting him before. It is clear that Mainwaring is not convinced. He orders Jones to group the POWs together for some drilling, but Jones' knowledge of Italian is limited and the POWs end up crashing into the fence.

That evening, Walker is skulking about outside the POW hut, where he meets with Monteverdi. He tells Walker that it is too risky to keep doing whatever they are doing. Walker insists that they will get the POWs out in the escape tunnel and they will have the radios working by dawn. They arrange to meet later, and sneak away, not knowing that Godfrey, who had been caught short, has overheard their conversation and alerts Mainwaring.

The platoon gathers outside the hut with the tunnel and rush in. But it is too late; the POWs have already escaped. Pike deduces that the tunnel is underneath the stove, and he is right. Mainwaring takes Pike and Jones through the tunnel, while Wilson, Godfrey and Frazer try to stop Walker from loading the men into the van.

They confront Walker outside the van, and Walker admits that he is using them as cheap labour to get some radios repaired for some clients. Mainwaring still has not arrived by this time, so Wilson and Frazer travel down the tunnel and find Mainwaring wedged in a wooden support. It is Jones who saves the day, by prodding Mainwaring with his bayonet.

Back outside, they see Captain Bailey arrive, and Mainwaring remembers that he rang GHQ about the regular troops' departure. After listening to Walker's explanation, Mainwaring orders him and Wilson to take the POWs back through the tunnel, and tries to stall Captain Bailey from entering the hut, but it is no use; he enters the hut before Wilson and Walker arrive with the POWs, and Jones is forced to sit on the stove to stop them getting in. Jones is determined to bluff their way out, so following an idea from Ali Baba and the Forty Thieves, he and Pike send the same prisoners round again and again, but their plan is ruined when the missing POWs emerge from underneath the stove.

== Cast ==
- Arthur Lowe as Captain Mainwaring
- John Le Mesurier as Sergeant Wilson
- Clive Dunn as Lance Corporal Jones
- John Laurie as Private Frazer
- James Beck as Private Walker
- Arnold Ridley as Private Godfrey
- Ian Lavender as Private Pike
- Edward Evans as General Monteverdi
- John Ringham as Captain Bailey
- Larry Martyn as Italian POW

== Notes ==
1. The episode title is drawn from the song of the same name, which is heard in the episode.
2. A number of references are made to opera in this episode. Mainwaring complains about "guarding a lot of comic opera soldiers", while Godfrey, when first trying to communicate with the Italians, says, "Your tiny hands are frozen, come and warm them by the fire," which is from the opera La Bohème, claiming it is the only Italian he knows.
3. The Italian prisoner of war who meets the platoon at the gate of the prison is played by Larry Martyn, who would later go on to play Private Walker in the BBC Radio version of Dad's Army after James Beck's death.
