= Friends and Neighbours =

1959 British film by Gordon Parry

- Original UK quad poster
- Directed by: Gordon Parry
- Written by: Talbot Rothwell; Val Valentine; Austin Steele (play)
- Produced by: Bertram Ostrer
- Starring: Arthur Askey; Megs Jenkins; Peter Illing
- Cinematography: Arthur Grant
- Edited by: Bill Lenny
- Music by: Philip Green
- Release date: November 1959
- Running time: 79 minutes
- Country: United Kingdom
- Language: English

Friends and Neighbours is a 1959 British comedy film directed by Gordon Parry and starring Arthur Askey, Megs Jenkins and Peter Illing. It was written by Talboth Rothwell and Val Valentine based on the play of the same title by Austin Steele.

== Plot ==
At the height of the Cold War, a working-class British family have to entertain two visitors from Russia.

== Cast ==
- Arthur Askey as Albert Grimshaw
- Megs Jenkins as Lily Grimshaw
- Peter Illing as Nukita
- Tilda Thamar as Olga
- Reginald Beckwith as Wilf Holmes
- June Whitfield as Doris Holmes
- Danny Ross as Sebastian Green
- Catherine Feller as Susan Grimshaw
- Jess Conrad as Buddy Fisher
- George A. Cooper as George Wheeler
- Max Robertson as TV announcer
- Arthur Howard as Rev. Dobson
- Eynon Evans as Shopkeeper
- Linda Castle as Gloria Stockwell
- Ken Parry as Sid
- Steven Scott as bus superintendent
- Richard Walter as bus inspector
- Donald Bisset as porter
- Anatole Smirnoff as Russian embassy official
- Laurence Herder as 1st Russian
- Paul Bogdan as 2nd Russian
- Alan Scott as 3rd Russian
- Dudley Jones as Sam
- Robert Checksfield as policeman
- Ruth Kettlewell as woman in club
- Camilla Hasse as 1st girl
- Julia Sutton as 2nd girl
- Pauline Shepherd as 3rd girl
- Judy Cornwell as 4th girl

== Reception ==
The Monthly Film Bulletin wrote: "Arthur Askey's improvisation atones somewhat for the paucity of wit and ideas in this ingenuous piece of broad knockabout; the targets – pubs and shop hours Act anomalies and cricket – are attacked with zest rather than originality."

In British Sound Films: The Studio Years 1928–1959 David Quinlan rated the film as "average", writing: "Vigorous farce along old-fashioned lines."
