= Arthur's Treasured Volumes =

- Anthea and Arthur Askey in Arthur's Treasured Volumes
- Genre: Sitcom
- Starring: Arthur Askey; Anthea Askey; Sam Kydd; Arthur Mullard
- Country of origin: United Kingdom
- No. of episodes: 6

Production
- Running time: 30 minutes
- Production company: ATV

Original release
- Network: ITV
- Release: 2 May – 6 June 1960

Arthur's Treasured Volumes is a black-and-white British television series that aired on ITV in 1960. Starring Arthur Askey, it was written by Dave Freeman and was made for the ITV network by ATV.

All six episodes were missing having been presumed wiped during the 1960s, until part of the first episode "A Blow In Anger" was recovered by Paul Stroud and shown at the National Film Theatre in November 2003. The remaining episodes were re-discovered in ITV's archive by a researcher from archive television organisation Kaleidoscope in December 2019.

== Cast ==
- Arthur Askey - Various
- Anthea Askey - Herself/narrator
- Sam Kydd - Various
- Arthur Mullard - Various
- Roger Avon - Various
- Tony Sampson - Various
- Paddi Edwards - Various
- Billy Tasker - Various
- Barbara Mitchell - Various
- Wilfrid Brambell - Various
- Patrick Newell - Various
- June Whitfield - Enid Brown
- Janet Davies - Miss Tiddy
- David Garth - Hamlet

== Plot ==
Arthur's Treasured Volumes was a series of one-episode sitcoms. At the beginning of each episode, Anthea Askey, Arthur's daughter, takes down a book from a shelf and the story begins. All the 'books' are in fact scripts written by Dave Freeman. In each episode, Arthur Askey, Sam Kydd and Arthur Mullard play different roles. Amongst those who made guest appearances were Wilfrid Brambell, Patrick Newell, June Whitfield and Geoffrey Palmer.

== Episodes ==
1. "A Blow In Anger" (2 May 1960)
2. "The History of Mr Lacey" (9 May 1960)
3. "The Command Performer" (16 May 1960)
4. "Pilbeam of Twickenham" (23 May 1960)
5. "A Slight Case of Deception" (30 May 1960)
6. "The Curse of the Bellfoots" (6 June 1960)
