= Ramsbottom Rides Again =

1956 British film by John Baxter

- Lobby card
- Directed by: John Baxter
- Written by: Basil Thomas; John Baxter
- Based on: play by Harold G. Robert
- Produced by: John Baxter; Barbara K. Emary
- Starring: Arthur Askey; Sid James; Frankie Vaughan; Shani Wallis; Betty Marsden; Jerry Desmonde
- Cinematography: Arthur Grant
- Edited by: Vi Burdon
- Music by: Billy Ternent
- Production company: Jack Hylton Productions
- Distributed by: British Lion Films
- Release date: June 1956
- Running time: 93 minutes
- Country: United Kingdom
- Language: English
- Box office: £109,116 (UK)

Ramsbottom Rides Again is a 1956 British western comedy film produced and directed by John Baxter, starring Arthur Askey, Sid James, Shani Wallis, Betty Marsden and Jerry Desmonde. It was written by Basil Thomas and John Baxter, based on a play by Harold G. Robert, with additional comedy scenes and dialogue by Askey, Glenn Melvyn and Geoffrey Orme.

== Plot ==
Yorkshire pub owner Bill Ramsbottom is finding the introduction of the "telly" has ruined his business at the "Bull & Cow". When he receives a cable from Canada, and learns that his grandfather "Wild Bill" Ramsbottom has left his estate to him, he confers with his family before deciding to set off for the frontier town of Lonesome in Canada to claim his inheritance.

When all the family fortune is gathered together, there is not enough money to pay for tickets on a steamship for everyone. Ramsbottom and his mate, Charlie Watson, stow away in big steamer trunks but are discovered by the crew. Made to work their passage, Charlie and Ramsbottom end up as culinary servers on the voyage. When the captain realizes that "Wild Bill" Ramsbottom's grandson is aboard, he allows him to travel as a passenger.

Arriving at Lonesome, Ramsbottom learns that part of his bequeathment, is that he is the new proprietor of the saloon, which also comes with the job of deputy sheriff in the lawless town. The feared outlaw Black Jake also claims he owns the saloon, but more importantly, wants to locate a hidden map that points the way to a uranium mine on Indian territory.

Ramsbottom and Black Jake have a confrontation at the saloon where the outlaw is arrested, but is later set free. When the map turns up, Charlie and Ramsbottom head off into Indian lands to locate the uranium mine. They run into Indian chief Blue Eagle and the local tribe.

When Black Jake rounds up his gang, a shootout takes place at the saloon. With the help of townspeople and the RCMP, Ramsbotttom is successful in defeating the outlaws and establishing peace in the town.

== Cast ==
- Arthur Askey as Bill Ramsbottom
- Glenn Melvyn as Charlie Watson
- Betty Marsden as Florrie Ramsbottom
- Shani Wallis as Joan Ramsbottom
- Danny Ross as Danny
- Anthea Askey as Susie
- Sidney James as Black Jake
- Frankie Vaughan as Elmer
- Jerry Desmonde as Blue Eagle
- Sabrina as attractive girl
- Donald Stewart as Captain
- Deryck Guyler as Postman
- Dennis Wyndham as Dan
- Gary Wayne as Tombstone
- Billy Percy as Reuben

Sabrina received a special billing, despite her minor role.

== Production ==
Ramsbottom Rides Again was filmed at Beaconsfield Film Studios, Beaconsfield, Buckinghamshire, England. The animated opening scene shows a Yorkshire landscape of homes with television aerials popping up, setting up the initial conundrum for the Bull & Cow pub.

== Music ==
Frankie Vaughan, in his film debut, sings "This is the Night" and "Ride, Ride, Ride Again."

== Critical reception ==
The Monthly Film Bulletin wrote: "Those amused by Arthur Askey's particular brand of unsophisticated clowning will no doubt find this film funny. To the uninitiated, it will probably appear only as a shapeless hotch-potch of weak slapstick, doubtful music-hall humour, old gags and unsuccessfully aimed satire. Sample joke: 'What's uranium?' – 'Use your cranium – it's the stuff they put under Geiger counters to make them tick'."

Picturegoer wrote: "It's corny; it's rowdy; it's erratic; it's over-boisterous and under-directed. If you asked me why I laughed so hard, I wouldn't be able to tell you. But I did. And I think you will, too. ... Askey lords it cleverly over his partners in comedy: Shani Wallis (as his daughter), Glenn Melvyn (as his gormless buddy) and Anthea Askey, as a tough Western gal. Sabrina, too, wanders through, practically wordless, now and then. But you barely notice her!"

Picture Show wrote: "Hilarious comedy ... A burlesque of the traditional Western, it makes good clean fun, has bright tunes and dialogue and an excellent cast."

In British Sound Films: The Studio Years 1928–1959 David Quinlan rated the film as "average", writing: "Broad English version of Destry Rides Again, on the juvenile side; Jerry Desmonde very funny as Indian named Blue Eagle."

TV Guide gave Ramsbottom Rides Again one out of four stars, calling it "A barely funny British parody of the American western."

Britmovie called it "laboured and overlong."

Sky Movies rated it three out of five stars, and wrote, "There are quite a few laughs in this broad English version of Destry Rides Again ... Lots of good-natured, juvenile fun ... with Sidney James getting in some practice for his Rumpo Kid in Carry On Cowboy by playing Black Jake. Norman Wisdom's sidekick Jerry Desmonde is very funny as an Indian named Blue Eagle."
