= Anthea Askey =

English actress (1933–1999)

- Born: Anthea Shirley Askey; 2 March 1933; Golders Green, London, England
- Died: 28 February 1999 (aged 65); Worthing, West Sussex, England
- Occupation: Actress
- Spouse: Bill Stewart (m. 1956)
- Children: 4
- Parent(s): Arthur Askey; Elizabeth Swash

Anthea Shirley Askey (2 March 1933 – 28 February 1999) was an English actress, particularly prominent on television in the 1950s.

Anthea Askey was born in Golders Green, north West London, to the comedian and actor Arthur Askey, and his wife Elizabeth May Swash. She featured in many television roles alongside her father.

Her early television appearances included Love and Kisses, where she played Rose Brown, whose father Bill was played by her father; while other TV and films include The Love Match, Ramsbottom Rides Again, Before Your Very Eyes, Living It Up, The Dickie Henderson Half-Hour, Arthur's Treasured Volumes and a cameo appearance in Make Mine a Million in 1959.

In 1993, she appeared in Climb the Greasy Pole: Part 1, an episode of The Darling Buds of May.

Askey died in Worthing, West Sussex, on 28 February 1999, aged 65.
