= Janet Davies (actress) =

English actress (1927–1986)

- Davies (left) as Mrs Pike in the last-ever Dad's Army episode Never Too Old in 1977
- Born: 14 September 1927; Wakefield, England
- Died: 22 September 1986 (aged 59); Bromley, England
- Years active: 1960–1986
- Spouse: Ian Gardiner (m. 1954)

Janet Kathleen Davies (14 September 1927 – 22 September 1986) was an English actress best known for her recurring role as Mrs. Pike in the long-running sitcom Dad's Army.

Although mainly remembered for her role in Dad's Army, appearing in 30 episodes of the series, she also featured in many other television and film roles including Dixon of Dock Green, The Fall and Rise of Reginald Perrin, All Creatures Great and Small, Last of the Summer Wine, Z-Cars, The Citadel, Pride and Prejudice, Open All Hours, Are You Being Served?, and in the films The Ghost Goes Gear (1966), and Interlude (1968).

She died on 22 September 1986, aged 59, from breast cancer which had metastasised to her lungs.

== Early life ==
Davies was born 14 September 1927, in Wakefield, West Riding of Yorkshire.

When she was not acting, Davies exploited her typing and shorthand training by working with various theatrical agencies. She was married to the actor Ian Gardiner, who was best known for having played Reginald Molehusband in a Central Office of Information public information film in the 1960s.

== Dad's Army ==
Davies was a client of the theatrical agent, Ann Callender, and also worked as a secretary for Callender whenever she was short of work. Callender was the wife of TV producer David Croft, the director, co-writer and producer of Dad's Army. Croft said that Davies "hastened to suggest herself for the part. After all, being in the office where the script first saw the light of day, she knew the requirements well." Davies went to see Croft in order to read for the part. Croft recalled that "She seemed to be just the right age and type to play the role."

Davies played the doting mother of Private Frank Pike (Ian Lavender), Mrs Pike, in 30 episodes of the sitcom, with her storylines mainly involving her relationship with Sergeant Wilson (John Le Mesurier) and her "mollycoddling" of her son, much to the annoyance of Captain Mainwaring (Arthur Lowe).

For the film version of Dad's Army (1971), Liz Fraser was cast as Mrs Pike. This decision was made by the director, Norman Cohen, who wanted a less "homely" actress for the role. The recasting was very controversial and one of the changes imposed by backers Columbia Pictures that added to the unhappiness of the cast. Co-writer of the television series, Jimmy Perry, has said "It was a mistake...not to cast Janet in the role because the viewing public has come to recognise her as Mrs. Pike. But that was a decision made by Columbia".

== Illness and death ==
Davies died on 22 September 1986 from breast cancer, which had metastasized to her lungs. Her Dad's Army co-star Bill Pertwee said that she "spent her last days in a hospice and died peacefully" adding that she was a "lovely woman".

== Television ==
Janet Davies' television appearances
Programme	Date	Channel	Role	Notes
Arthur's Treasured Volumes	6 June 1960	ATV	Miss Tiddy	Episode 6: The Curse of the Bellfoots
Police Surgeon	24 September 1960	ABC Weekend Television	Welsh Woman	Episode 3: Lag on the Run
The Citadel	23 November 1960 – 30 November 1960	Associated-Rediffusion Television	Neighbour	TV mini-series- Series 1: Episodes 1 and 2
Emergency Ward 10	24 February 1961		Anne French	Series 1, Episode 420
The Desperate People	24 March 1963		Joyce Naylor	Series 1: Episode 5
The Saint	24 October 1963	ITV	Pearl	Series 2: Episode 6: Marcia
Gideon's Way	16 January 1965	ITV	Nurse	Series 1: Episode 16: Fall High, Fall Hard. (Uncredited)
Dr Finlay's Casebook	26 February 1967	BBC One	Nurse	Series 5: Episode 9
The Gamblers	23 November 1967		Anne	Series 1: Episode 11: Tycoon of the Year
Champion House	30 May 1968		Miss Jennings	Series 2: Episode 8 : Pilot Error
Gazette	30 August 1968		Mrs. Goodison	Series 1: Episode 5: It's All Happening!
Dixon of Dock Green	14 March 1964 – 15 January 1972	BBC Television	Mrs. Walters; Mrs. White; Mrs. Thomas; May Nelson; Mrs. Perryman; Mrs. Baker	Six episodes
Fish	8 January 1973 - 29 January 1973		Mrs. Price	TV mini-series, Four episodes
The Rivals of Sherlock Holmes	12 February 1973		Perkins	Series 2: Episode 3: Cell 13
Are You Being Served?	18 April 1973	BBC Television	The Oversize Dress	Series 1: Episode 5: Diamonds Are a Man's Best Friend
Hey Brian!	19 June 1973			Series 1: Episode 6
Helen: A Woman of Today	28 September 1973		Solicitor's Secretary	Series 1: Episode 2
Casanova '73	15 October 1973		Man opposite's Wife	Series 1: Episode 5
Vienna 1900	12 January 1974	BBC Television	Frau Garian	TV mini-series, Series 1: Episode 6: The Spring Sonata
Marked Personal	22 January 1974 - 23 January 1974	Thames Television	Gwyneth Morgan	Two episodes: Series 1: Episodes 21 and 22
Childhood	21 April 1974		Gertie	'Possessions'
Play for Today	5 February 1973 - 23 January 1975	BBC Television	Nurse; Rose	Two episodes: Song at Twilight and Breath
Last of the Summer Wine	12 March 1975 - 26 March 1975	BBC Television	Miss Jones	Two episodes: Series 2: Episodes 2 and 4
Sadie, It's Cold Outside	5 May 1975		Receptionist	Series 1: Episode 3
Lucky Feller	24 September 1976		First Woman	Series 1: Episode 4: Kath's Family
Dad's Army	31 July 1968 - 6 November 1977	BBC Television	Mrs Pike	Recurring Character- 30 episodes.
All Creatures Great and Small	12 February 1978 - 26 February 1978	BBC Television	Mrs. Dalby	Three episodes, Series 1: Episodes 6, 7 and 8.
Angels	4 October 1976 - 19 June 1978		Liz Thomas; Saleswoman	Two episodes, Series 3:Episode 5 and Season 4:Episode 1
Z-Cars	19 June 1962 - 9 August 1978	BBC Television	Mary Russell; Valerie Jolliffe; Mrs. Garrett; Mrs. Pagett; Molly	Six episodes.
The Fall and Rise of Reginald Perrin	27 December 1978	BBC Television	Ethel Merman	Series 3: Episode 4: Communal Social Evenings
Rosie	28 June 1979		Violet	Series: Episode 4: Happy Birthday, Mr Chizzlehurst.
Testament of Youth	11 November 1979		Sarah	TV mini-series Season 1: Episode 2: Buxton 1914
Pride and Prejudice	10 February 1980	BBC Television	Mrs. Hill	TV mini-series, Season 1, Episode 5
Nice Work	5 November 1980		Neighbour	Series 1: Episode 4: Kill the Fatted Hen
Open All Hours	18 April 1982	BBC Television	Mrs. Blake	Series 3: Episode 5: The Man from Down Under
Something in Disguise	7 July 1982 - 4 August 1982		Mrs. Green	Three episodes, Series 1 : Episodes 2,6 and 4
The Professionals	21 November 1982	London Weekend Television	Roz Hatch	Series 5: Episode 3: You'll Be Alright
The Citadel	20 January 1983 - 27 January 1983	BBC Television	Mrs. Watkins	TV mini-series, Part 1 and 2
Death of an Expert Witness	22 April 1983	Anglia Television	Mrs. Winifred Swaffield	TV mini-series, Season 1: Episode 3
Terry and June	28 September 1985		Customer (as Jan Davies)	Series 8: Episode 4: New Doors for Old
Don't Wait Up	8 November 1983 - 27 January 1986	BBC Television	Florrie	Two Episodes, Series 1:Episode 3, and Season 3: Episode 7
That's My Boy	15 February 1985 - 21 March 1986		Mrs. Lacey	Two episodes, Series 4, Episode 5, and Series 5, Episode 5.
Bread	1 May 1986	BBC Television	D.H.S.S Claimant	Season 1: Episode 1, (final television appearance)

== Filmography ==
Janet Davies' Film Appearances
Film	Year	Role	Notes
The Love Match	1953	Motorist	
The Ghost Goes Gear	1966	Cockney Wife	
Interlude	1968	Nanny	
Under Milk Wood	1972		
What Next?	1974	Mother	
In this House of Brede	1975	Mrs. Scanlon	TV movie
The Hiding Place	1975	Mrs. Beukers	Uncredited
Love Story: Mr Right	1983	Waitress	TV movie
Terry on the Fence	1986	Usher	
