= Arthur Askey =

English comedian and actor (1900–1982)

Arthur Askey CBE
- Born: 6 June 1900; Dingle, Liverpool, England
- Died: 16 November 1982 (aged 82); Lambeth, London, England
- Resting place: Putney Vale Cemetery and Crematorium, London, England
- Spouse: Elizabeth Swash (m. 1925; died 1974)
- Children: Anthea
- Parent(s): Samuel Askey; Betsy Bowden

Comedy career
- Genres: Stand-up, comedic acting

Arthur Bowden Askey (6 June 1900 – 16 November 1982) was an English comedian and actor. Askey was known for his short stature (5 ft 2 in (1.57 m)) and distinctive horn-rimmed glasses, and his playful humour incorporating improvisation and catchphrases including "Hello, playmates", "I thank you" (pronounced "Ay-thang-yaw") and "Before your very eyes".

Askey achieved prominence in the 1930s in the BBC's first radio comedy series Band Waggon and subsequently starred in several Gainsborough Pictures comedy films during the Second World War including Charley's (Big-Hearted) Aunt (1940) and The Ghost Train (1941). His novelty recordings for the His Master's Voice label include "The Bee Song" (1938), a lasting part of his act. Askey was a prominent television presence from the 1950s onward, and made regular appearances on the BBC's long-running music hall programme The Good Old Days. He was made an OBE in 1969 and a CBE in 1981; he continued to appear frequently on television, radio and the stage until his death in 1982.

== Early life and education ==
Askey was born at 29 Moses Street, Dingle, Liverpool, the eldest child and only son of Betsy (née Bowden), originally from Knutsford, Cheshire, and Samuel Askey, company secretary of Sugar Products of Liverpool. Six months after his birth, the family moved to 90 Rosslyn Street, Liverpool. It was here that a sister, Irene Dorothy, was born. Askey was educated at St. Michael's Council School (1905–11) and the Liverpool Institute for Boys (1911–16).

== Career ==
Askey served in the Royal Welch Fusiliers in the First World War and performed in army entertainments. This would prove an excellent training ground for his career in show business. He performed with the touring pantomime "Little Miss Muffet" in the early 1920s and made his first professional appearance coming on stage at the Headgate Theatre in Colchester on the 31 March 1924. After working as a clerk for Liverpool Corporation's Education Department, he was in a touring concert party, the music halls and was in the stage company of Powis Pinder on the Isle of Wight in the early 1930s before he rose to stardom in 1938 through his role in the first regular radio comedy series, Band Waggon on the BBC. Band Waggon began as a variety show, but had been unsuccessful until Askey and his partner, Richard Murdoch, took on a larger role in the writing.

=== Film roles ===
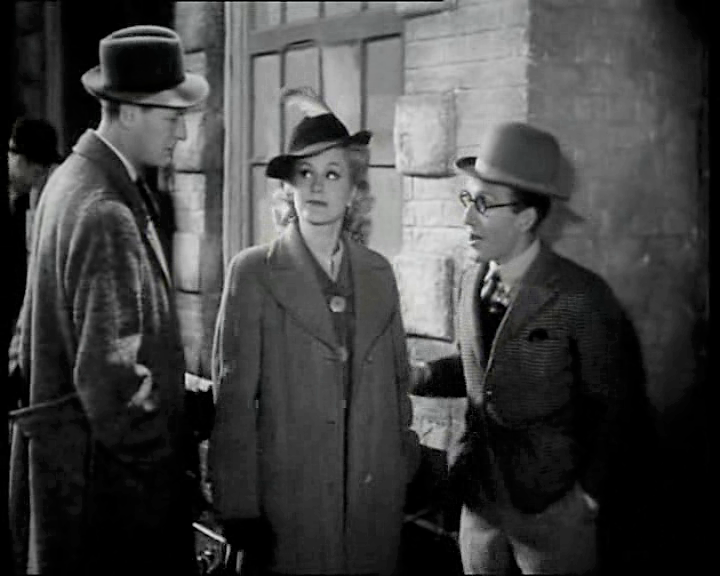
Arthur Askey (right) with Richard Murdoch (left) and Carole Lynne (centre) in The Ghost Train (1941)

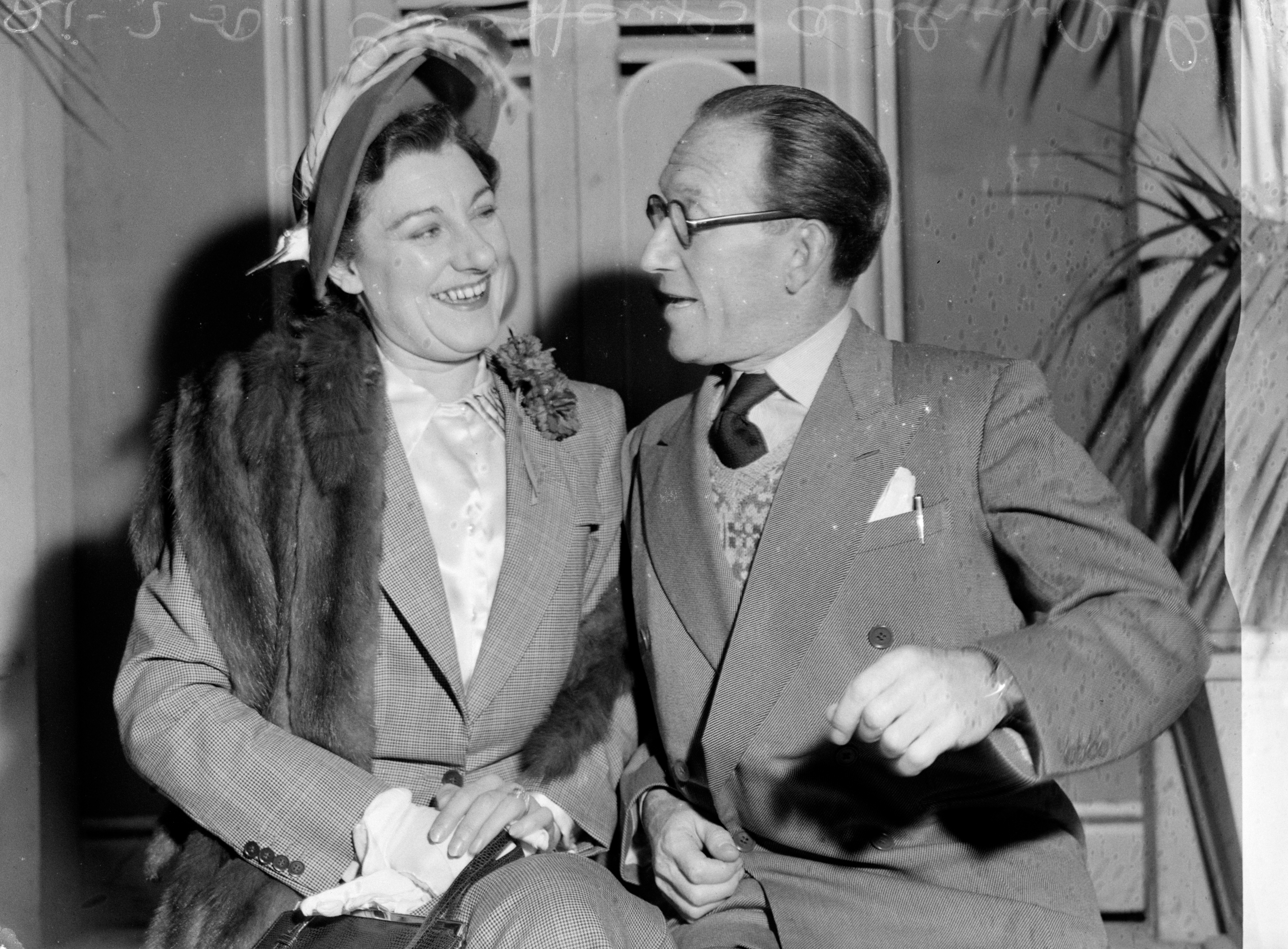
Evie Hayes and Arthur Askey, Sydney, 1950

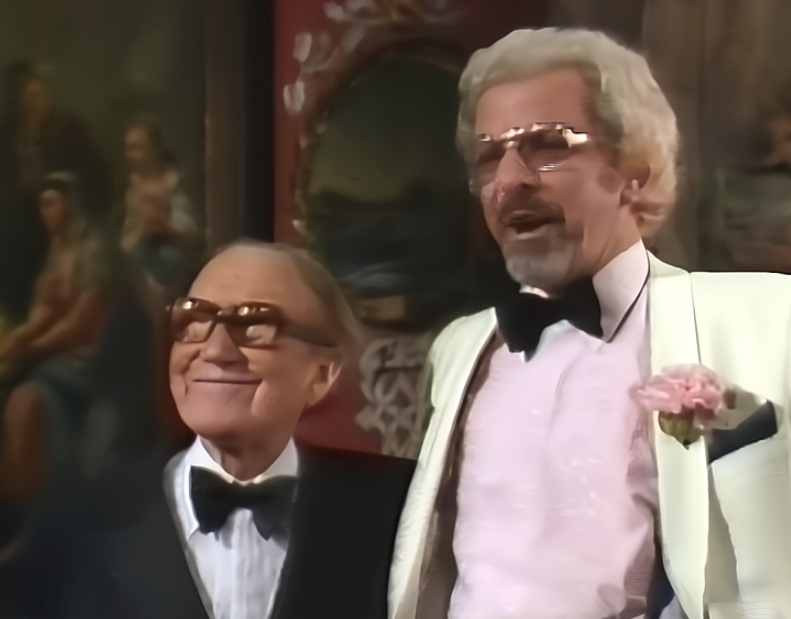
Askey and Barry Cryer performing in The Green Tie on the Little Yellow Dog

During the Second World War Askey starred in several Gainsborough Pictures comedy films, including Band Waggon (1940), based on the radio show; Charley's (Big-Hearted) Aunt (1940); The Ghost Train (1941); I Thank You (1941); Back-Room Boy (1942); King Arthur Was a Gentleman (1942); Miss London Ltd. (1943); Bees in Paradise (1944); The Love Match (1955) and Make Mine a Million (1959).

His last film was Rosie Dixon – Night Nurse (1978), starring Debbie Ash.

=== Television ===
In the early 1930s, Askey appeared on an early form of BBC television—the spinning disc invented by John Logie Baird that scanned vertically and had only thirty lines. Askey had to be heavily made up for his face to be recognisable at such low resolution. When television became electronic, with 405 horizontal lines, Askey was a regular performer in variety shows. When television returned after the second World War, his first TV series was Before Your Very Eyes! (1952), named after his catchphrase. On 3 May 1956, Askey presented Meet The People, a launch night programme for Granada Television. In 1957 writers Sid Colin and Talbot Rothwell revived the Band Waggon format for Living It Up, a series that reunited Askey and Murdoch after 18 years. He continued to appear frequently on television in the 1970s, such as being a panellist on the ITV talent show New Faces, where his usually sympathetic comments would offset the harsher judgments of fellow judges Tony Hatch and Mickie Most. He also appeared on the comedy panel game Jokers Wild. He made many TV appearances in variety, including BBC TV's long-running show The Good Old Days. His final professional engagement was The Green Tie on the Little Yellow Dog, recorded in 1982 and broadcast by Channel 4 in 1983.

=== Radio ===
In the late 1940s, Askey participated in the BBC radio show How Do You Do in which listeners could write into the BBC asking for him to come and broadcast a show from their homes, twelve shows were broadcast with Arthur, his daughter Anthea and special guests, as well as a surprise guest each week which was revealed some time throughout the programme. The theme of each show was worked around the occupation of the family from where it was broadcast. This was broadcast on the Light Programme. Only one of the shows was recorded onto acetate discs, which are now held at the British Library.

During the 1950s and 1960s, he appeared in many sitcoms, including Love and Kisses, Arthur's Treasured Volumes and The Arthur Askey Show. He was the subject of This Is Your Life on two occasions, in December 1959 when he was surprised by Eamonn Andrews, and in December 1974, when Andrews, dressed as Humpty Dumpty, surprised him on a television show while discussing the art of pantomime. Askey made four appearances on the BBC Radio series Desert Island Discs in 1942, 1955, 1968 and 1980. He shares the record for most appearances on the programme with David Attenborough.

=== Theatre ===
Askey appeared in the West End musical Follow the Girls. He also made many stage appearances as a pantomime dame.

=== Recordings ===
Askey's recording career included "The Bee Song", which was an integral part of his stage and television act for many years, "The Thing-Ummy Bob", "I'd Like a Banana", and his theme tune, "Big-Hearted Arthur" (which was also his nickname). In 1941 a song he intended to record, "It's Really Nice to See You Mr Hess" (Note: The song is alternatively known as "Thanks for Dropping in Mr Hess") (after Hitler's deputy Rudolf Hess fled to Scotland), was banned by the War Office. A collection of Askey's wartime recordings appear on the CD album Band Waggon/Big Hearted Arthur Goes To War.

== Private Eye ==
Private Eye magazine in the 1970s regularly made the comment that he and the Queen Mother had "never been seen in the same room together", referring to the fact that they were about the same age and height and suggesting that the Queen Mother was Askey in drag.

== Honours ==
Askey was appointed OBE in 1969 and advanced to CBE in 1981.

== Personal life, illness and death ==
Askey was married to Elizabeth May Swash in 1925 until her death in 1974; he was the father of actress Anthea Askey (1933–1999).

Askey carried on working on his comedy career until just before he was hospitalised in July 1982, owing to poor circulation, which resulted in gangrene and the amputation of both legs. He died in London's St Thomas's Hospital on 16 November 1982 and was cremated at Putney Vale Crematorium.

== Filmography ==
=== Film ===
Year	Title	Role	Notes
1937	Calling All Stars	Waiter	
1940	Band Waggon	Arthur Askey	credited as Big Hearted Arthur
1940	Charley's (Big-Hearted) Aunt	Arthur Linden	
1941	The Ghost Train	Tommy Gander	
1941	I Thank You	Arthur	
1942	Back-Room Boy	Arthur Pilbeam	
1942	King Arthur Was a Gentleman	Arthur King	
1943	Miss London Ltd.	Arthur Bowman	
1944	Bees in Paradise	Arthur Tucker	
1955	The Love Match	Bill Brown	
1956	Ramsbottom Rides Again	Bill Ramsbottom	
1959	Make Mine a Million	Arthur Ashton	
1959	Friends and Neighbours	Albert Grimshaw	
1972	The Alf Garnett Saga	himself	
1978	Rosie Dixon – Night Nurse	Mr Arkwright	

=== Television ===
Year	Title	Role	Notes
1951	Arthur Askey	himself	2 shows
1952	Before Your Very Eyes!	himself	BBC, 14 episodes
1952	Bet Your Life	Arthur Golightly	TV movie
1953	The Love Match	Bill Brown	TV movie
1955	Love and Kisses	Bill Brown	5 episodes
1956	Before Your Very Eyes	himself	ITV, 14 episodes
1957	A Santa for Christmas		TV movie
1957–1958	Living it Up	himself	9 episodes
1959–1960	The Arthur Askey Show	himself	6 episodes
1960	Arthur's Treasured Volumes	various	6 episodes
1961	The Arthur Askey Show	Arthur Pilbeam	6 episodes
1964	Ninety Years On	Billy Merson	TV movie
1966	Second Honeymoon	Arthur Bowden	TV movie
1966	Aladdin and His Wonderful Lamp	Widow Twankey	TV movie
1967	No Strings	Arthur Anders	TV film

== Legacy ==
Arthur Askey is among other famous names in the Dirk Wears White Sox version of "Friends" by Adam and the Ants.

== See also ==
- Radio comedy
- Cinema of the United Kingdom
- List of British actors

== Bibliography ==
- Arthur Askey (autobiography). Before Your Very Eyes (London: Woburn Press, 1975) ISBN 0-7130-0134-8
- Kurt Ganzl. The Encyclopedia of the Musical Theatre (New York: Shirmer Books, 2001) pp. 75 ISBN 0-02-864970-2
- Murphy, Robert. (2005). British Cinema and the Second World War. A&C Black
- Slide, Anthony. I Thank You: The Arthur Askey Story. (Orlando, Florida: BearManor Media, 2020).
