= Ikkyū (disambiguation) =

Ikkyū was an eccentric, iconoclastic Japanese Zen Buddhist monk and poet.

Ikkyū may refer to:

- Ikkyū (manga), a Japanese manga series by Hisashi Sakaguchi
- Ikkyū, was a town located in Okayama Prefecture, Japan

== See also ==
- Ikkyū-san (disambiguation)
