= Dermo-optical perception =

Alleged optical perception through skin

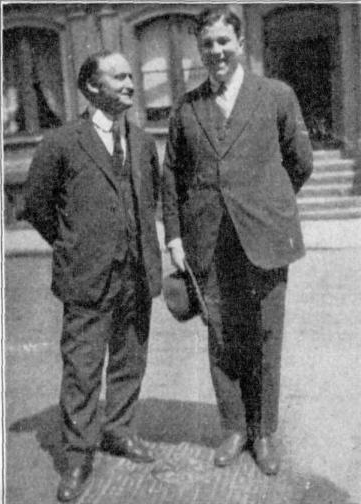
The magician Harry Houdini with Joaquin María Argamasilla known as the "Spaniard with X-ray Eyes"

Dermo-optical perception (DOP, also known as dermal vision, dermo-optics, skin vision, skin reading, finger vision, cutaneous perception, digital sight, and bio-introscopy) is a term that is used in parapsychological literature to denote the alleged capability to perceive colors, differences in brightness, and/or formed images through the skin (without using the eyes, as distinct from blindsight), especially upon touching with the fingertips.

Typically, people who claim to have dermo-optical perception claim to be able to see using the skin of their fingers or hands. People who claim to have DOP often demonstrate it by reading while blindfolded. The effect has not been demonstrated scientifically.

Paroptic vision – also known as paroptic sense, eyeless vision, eyeless sight, para-optic perception, extra-optical vision or extra-retinal vision (not to be confused with extra-retinal information, an unrelated neuroscientific concept) – is a broader term referring to the alleged ability to perceive visual phenomena by any means without the light from the scene entering the eyes. Besides DOP it includes for example the ability to see an object enclosed by a box that is impervious to light.

== History ==
The first Western scientific reports are from the 17th century. Scattered cases kept being reported over the years, but scientific interest did not pick up until the 20th century. ESP researchers enthusiastically studied DOP, hoping that it was an example of extra-sensory perception, but they could only conclude that some of the results could not be explained by cheating.

According to Joe Nickell, a noted skeptic, many circus entertainers and magicians have utilized tricks to perform eyeless-sight feats. In the 1880s Washington Irving Bishop performed the "blindfold drive" with a horse-drawn carriage. In the early 20th century Joaquín María Argamasilla known as the "Spaniard with X-ray Eyes" claimed to be able to read handwriting or numbers on dice through closed metal boxes. Argamasilla managed to fool Gustav Geley and Charles Richet into believing he had genuine psychic powers. In 1924 he was exposed by Harry Houdini as a fraud. Argamasilla peeked through his simple blindfold and lifted up the edge of the box so he could look inside it without others noticing.

A teenager from America named Pat Marquis known as "the boy with X-ray eyes" was tested by J. B. Rhine and was caught peeking through the blindfold down his nose. Science writer Martin Gardner has written that the ignorance of blindfold deception methods has been widespread in investigations into objects at remote locations from persons who claim to possess eyeless vision. Gardner documented various conjuring techniques psychics such as Rosa Kuleshova, Linda Anderson and Nina Kulagina have used to peek from their blindfolds to deceive investigators into believing they used eyeless vision.

Life magazine reported on several cases on June 12, 1964, and on April 19, 1937, calling them "X-ray wonders", but all of them were found to be cheating when tested under controlled conditions. The article on 12 June reported on accounts of DOP in the Soviet Union. This focused on Rosa Kuleshova of Nizhni Tagil, whose alleged abilities were demonstrated on a TV programme called Relay watched by over 40 million viewers. This encouraged the mother of 9 year old Lena Blisznova to claim her daughter had similar abilities. They reported on the research of the psychologist Aleksei N. Leontiev, who used a Pavlovian techniques to explore DOP several years previously and then had the role of leading a research programme into the claimed phenomenon. Although Leontiev would only express his personal opinion that there was substance behind the alleged phenomenon, the Russian American expert on Soviet Psychology Gregory Razran was particularly excited about the research declaring "In all my years, I can't remember when anything has had me more excited than this prospect of opening up new doors of perception." Complaining that he was too excited to sleep at night, he opined that this was a "major scientific breakthrough" which would lead to an "explosive outburst of research" whose results were "bound to be revolutionary". Razran was keen to return to Queens College, City University of New York, where he was a professor and planned to carry out further research himself. Razran had been head of the Psychology department at Queens since 1945, but relinquished the post in 1966.

In 2010, an Italian lady known as R. G. who claimed she could peer inside sealed boxes with X-ray vision to describe what is inside was tested at the University of Pavia by Massimo Polidoro, chemist Luigi Garlaschelli and physicist Adalberto Piazzoli. Twelve objects were selected and placed in wooden boxes. She failed the test, getting only one object correct.

Joe Nickell who has studied DOP has written "To date, no one has demonstrated convincingly, under suitably controlled conditions, the existence of X-ray sight or any other form of clairvoyance or ESP."

== Scientific reception ==
Experiments into DOP by scientists have shown no effect. Alleged positive results have not been accepted by the mainstream scientific community due to procedures not being tight enough to prevent cheating by participants, problems with replicating the effect reliably, and concerns about the colors being recognized by the texture of the ink on the paper (people who are blind from an early age can recognize Braille patters that only have .2 millimeters of elevation above the paper, and the limit of relief distinction in fingers is still unknown). In summary, DOP has not been demonstrated scientifically.

Most of DOP positive results have been explained as cheating by participants, either via the use of magicians' tricks, or via "peeking down the nose" (cheating by participants) In recent years, DOP has been the object of mainstream research that had no links with ESP.

Apart from trickery, there are several hypotheses about how fingers could "see" radiation emitted by the colors in the paper, but none have been tested successfully. For example, people can hold their fingers near to painted and non-painted surfaces, and distinguish them by how much corporal heat is radiated back to their fingers. While it has not been verified if fingers can be sensitive enough to detect heat radiation from different inks in paper, it is theorized that blind people could plausibly do it.

== See also ==
- Synesthesia, in which stimulation of one sensory or cognitive pathway leads to automatic, involuntary experiences in a second sensory or cognitive pathway

== Bibliography (in English, Russian, and Ukrainian) ==
- Познанская, Н. Б. (1936). Кожная чувствительность к инфракрасным и к видимым лучам, «Бюл. экспер. биологии и медицины», т. 2, вып. 5. (in Russian)
- Познанская, Н. Б. (1938). Кожная чувствительность к видимому и инфракрасному облучению, «Физиологический журнал СССР», т. XXIV, вып. 4. (in Russian)
- Леонтьев, А. Н. Проблемы развития психики. М., МГУ, 1959 (in Russian)
- Houdini, H. (1924). A Complete Exposure of Argamasilla, the Famous Spaniard who Baffled Noted Scientists of Europe and America, with His Claim to X-ray Vision. Adams Press.
- Список публикаций А.С. Новомейского по вопросам кожно-оптической чувствительности (in Russian)
- Makous W (1966). "Cutaneous color sensitivity: explanation and demonstration". Psychological Review. 73 (4): 280–294. doi:10.1037/h0023440. PMID 5943979.
- Makous W (1966). "Dermoptical perception". Science. 152 (3725): 1109. doi:10.1126/science.152.3725.1109.a.
- Duplessis Y (1985). "Dermo-optical sensitivity and perception: Its influence on human behavior". Biosocial Research. 7: 76–93. Archived from the original on 2010-06-21.
- Passini R., Rainville C. (1992). "The dermo-optical perception of color as an information source for blind travelers". Perceptual and Motor Skills. 75 (3): 995–1010. doi:10.2466/pms.1992.75.3.995. PMID 1454507. S2CID 25379724.
- Мизрахи В.М. (1998). Психологические условия развития кожно-оптического восприятия цвета у слепых школьников (idem). Диссертационная работа канд. психол. наук. Киев (in Ukrainian)
- Larner A.J. (2006). "A possible account of synaesthesia dating from the seventeenth century" (PDF). Journal of the History of the Neurosciences. 15 (3): 245–249. doi:10.1080/09647040500388661. PMID 16887762. S2CID 8346142.
- Gardner, M (11 February 1966). "Dermo-optical Perception: A Peek Down the Nose". Science. 151 (3711): 654–657. Bibcode:1966Sci...151..654G. doi:10.1126/science.151.3711.654. PMID 5908072.
