= Wolf Guy =

Japanese manga series

ウルフガイ (Urufu Gai)
- Manga
- Written by: Kazumasa Hirai
- Illustrated by: Hisashi Sakaguchi
- Published by: Bunkasha
- Magazine: Shuukan Bokura Magazine
- Original run: 1970 – 1971
- Volumes: 2
- Live-action film

Ōkami no Monshō
- Directed by: Shōji Matsumoto
- Produced by: Osamu Tanaka
- Written by: Jun Fukuda
- Music by: Riichiro Manabe
- Studio: Toho
- Released: September 1, 1973
- Runtime: 83 minutes
- Live-action film

Urufu gai: Moero ôkami-otoko
- Directed by: Kazuhiko Yamaguchi
- Produced by: Tōru Yoshida (planning)
- Written by: Fumio Kônami
- Music by: Jun Fukamachi
- Studio: Toei Company
- Released: April 5, 1975
- Runtime: 86 minutes
- Original video animation
- Directed by: Naoyuki Yoshinaga
- Music by: Kenji Kawai
- Studio: J.C.Staff
- Released: December 17, 1992 – June 21, 1993
- Episodes: 6
- Manga
- Written by: Kazumasa Hirai; Yoshiaki Tabata
- Illustrated by: Izumitani Ayumi
- Published by: Akita Shoten
- Magazine: Young Champion
- Original run: 2007 – 2012
- Volumes: 12

Wolf Guy (ウルフガイ, Urufu Gai) is a Japanese manga series of two volumes published in 1970 by Bunkasha. Originally written by Kazumasa Hirai and illustrated by Hisashi Sakaguchi (坂口尚), the series has been readapted with a more violent and mature setting in 2007 by Yoshiaki Tabata and Yuuki Yugo. This new adaptation, also known as Wolf Guy: Ōkami no Monshō, has been released as twelve volumes by Akita Shoten.

A live-action film adaptation, titled Horror of the Wolf (Ōkami no monshō) was released in 1973.

== 2007 version plot ==
Akira Inugami is a new exchange student at Hakutoku Middle School, but there is another side of him that is secret. He is a werewolf.

Homeroom teacher Akiko Aoshika walking home drunk, suddenly trips and is saved by Akira Inugami who then proceeds to walk away. Aoshika-san sees that he is a student and pursues him only for Inugami to be jumped by his old school rivals. The gang attacks Inugami without mercy and seems to beat him to death, yet he keeps getting back up. They then hit him with a car and he appears dead. They begin to rifle through his pockets. Aoshika-san faints soon after witnessing it. The gang was ambushed by a large animal, which no one can seemingly make out what it is entirely. When Aoshika-san awakens, she finds the gang dead around her and is escorted to her school by the police only to find that Inugami is her new exchange student.

Aoshika-san singles him out and inspects his body physically, but finds no wounds or scars to solidify the events that happened the night before. Both are discovered by Ryuuko Konuma. Soon after being introduced to her class, his classmates start to bully him, particularly the Kuroda twins. One of them falls into a coma after he accidentally but fatally stabbed himself while trying to attack him. Dou Haguro, son to a Yakuza, returns to school after hearing about Inugami's resistance to their gang and lures him out to be beaten on top of the school's roof. He then carves the word "mutt" on his back but after they leave, Inugami's wounds are healed. Aoshika-san later goes to visit him, unknowingly seeing his werewolf form, and then gets attacked by a man and then an escaped lion from a nearby zoo. Inugami saves her but lets the authorities find her instead.

Inugami's pacifism against Haguro's gang starts to gain attention throughout the school, both among the students and the school staff. School President and Vice President, Shirou Kouda and Noriko Kimura, along with Aoshika-san urges Inugami to speak out against Haguro's gang. Inugami refuses to speak because he believes their cause is useless. Aoshika-san later meets reporter Jin who warns her to stay away from Inugami but she is already falling in love with her student. As revenge for the younger twin brother, Older twin Kuroda gathers gangsters under Haguro's name to kill Inugami. For this offense, Haguro severs his pinky. Having heard from a witness on television that Inugami's "mutt" wound is gone, he asks Chiba and Ryuuko to investigate.

To push Kuroda even further, Haguro kills the comatose younger twin brother with the older twin brother's knowledge and then supplies him with guns and grenades to go after Inugami. During a school conference with media, Inugami has lectures the media along with students and staff as sheep. The school is then under attack by Kuroda who opened fire on everyone before Inugami kills him with his own grenade. Despite winning, he is overcome with guilt for not being able to prevent the school shooting from happening. He is later stalked by Haguro but leaves to watch as Haguro is hunted down by other assassins. Once taking care of them, Inugami scares Haguro with his werewolf form, hoping that he would stay away. Haguro sees that the wound "mutt" is longer on his back, but Chiba reported otherwise. This only caused Haguro to have an epiphany instead. Days after students returned to school, Haguro creates another mass shooting, hoping to get Inugami's attention. He then confronts Chiba who lied about Inugami's scar and violently tortured him before leaving him for dead at a hospital. Inugami, who found him, offers his blood as transfusion but Chiba did not survive. Later, he is revived by Inugami's blood and chases after Haguro. A large fiery battle ensues at Bay Bridge where Chiba had metamorphosed into a deformed monster, but Haguro eventually kills him by decapitation. After winning this battle, Haguro's ego becomes inflated and he kidnaps Ryuuko as bait to lure Inugami to him. After being tortured, Ryuuko instead diverts his attention to kidnap Aoshika-san whom Inugami had fallen in love with.

Inugami is later given a URL to access a webcam of Aoshika-san's violent rape by several men, one of them being Haguro. He becomes greatly conflicted as he tries to resist his love for his teacher, as well as his loss of power during the New Moon. Through Aoshika-san's coworker Tadokoro, Inugami tracks down Haguro's residence but finds that Aoshika-san's rape had been uploaded on the internet. He is then lured to an empty plaza where Haguro, via webcam, asks him to transform into a werewolf or another video of Aoshika-san's rape will be publicized again. He becomes frustrated but manages to telepathically talk to her, both of them confessing their love for each other. He later meets Ryuuko who forces him to have sex with her; when Inugami refuses, she stabs him multiple times before offering a location to an abandoned hotel. Once there, Inugami fights against a pack of dogs, men, and heavy artillery before he reaches Aoshika-san. He releases her but cannot escape Haguro who has become mentally unstable and starts to consume every severed piece of Inugami's body, hoping to become just like him. Inugami lays dying and powerless before the Full Moon appears and temporarily gives him power to transform and finally kills Haguro.

The authorities later manages to save them with Jin's and Tadokoro's help but separated the two victims. Aoshika-san wakes up from a 3-day coma and learns that Inugami died. After several suicide attempts, she then requests to fly to Alaska to live with the wolves who raised Inugami. Two months later, Inugami is revived by his own immortality as a test subject but only has the memory of promising to bring Aoshika-san to Alaska. While in Alaska, Aoshika-san and her wolves could hear a distant howl and they howl back.

(Note: This plot by Tabata and Yugo differs greatly from the original novel written by Kazumasa Hirai.)
