= Genma Wars =

Japanese science fiction media franchise

- Cover of the first volume, as released by Akita Shoten

幻魔大戦
- Genre: Adventure; Dark fantasy; Science fiction
- Manga
- Written by: Kazumasa Hirai
- Illustrated by: Shotaro Ishinomori
- Published by: Kodansha
- Magazine: Weekly Shōnen Magazine
- Original run: 1967 – 1968
- Volumes: 2
- Manga

Neo-Genma Wars
- Written by: Kazumasa Hirai
- Illustrated by: Shotaro Ishinomori
- Published by: Tokuma Shoten
- Magazine: SF Adventure
- Original run: 1971 – 1974
- Volumes: 2
- Manga

The Eve of Myth
- Written by: Shotaro Ishinomori
- Published by: Tokuma Shoten
- Magazine: Monthly Comic Ryū
- Original run: May 1979 – November 1981
- Volumes: 4
- Anime film

Harmagedon
- Directed by: Rintaro
- Produced by: Susumu Aketagawa; Shotaro Ishinomori; Haruki Kadokawa
- Written by: Chiho Katsura; Makoto Naitō; Mori Masaki
- Music by: Nozomi Aoki (Note: Composed by Aoki, with music direction by Keith Emerson.)
- Studio: Madhouse; Kadokawa
- Released: March 12, 1983
- Runtime: 135 minutes
- Video game

Bega's Battle
- Developer: Data East
- Publisher: Data East
- Genre: Interactive movie, shooter game
- Platform: Arcade
- Released: June 1983
- Anime television series

The Eve of Myth
- Directed by: Tsuneo Tominaga
- Produced by: Sachiko Arifuku; Takumi Ogawa; Asayuki Imai; Masataka Yamamoto; Takashi Kasakura
- Written by: Shōzō Uehara
- Music by: Hiroshi Motokura
- Studio: E&G Films
- Licensed by: US: Media Blasters
- Original network: AT-X
- Original run: February 2, 2002 – May 11, 2002
- Episodes: 13
- Manga

Rebirth
- Written by: Kyōichi Nanatsuki
- Illustrated by: Masato Hayase
- Published by: Shogakukan
- Magazine: Sunday Webry
- Original run: 2014 – 2019
- Volumes: 11

Genma Wars (Japanese: 幻魔大戦, Hepburn: Genma Taisen) is a Japanese science fiction manga and novel franchise that began in 1967. It was a collaboration in Weekly Shōnen Magazine by science fiction writer Kazumasa Hirai and manga artist Shotaro Ishinomori. It was adapted into a 1983 anime film, a 2002 anime television series, and a 1983 laserdisc video game called Bega's Battle in North America.

== Plot ==
The series tells the story of the battle between the Earth's defenders and a demonic entity named Genma Daioh. Its first protagonist is Jō Azuma, a Japanese high school student of the 1970s who suddenly finds out he has psychic powers and is being called along with other psychics around the globe. They are gathered by Vega, an alien cyborg warrior, and Luna, the princess of Transylvania, who have discovered the presence of Genma traveling towards the Earth with the intention to conquer it. In order to stop him, Luna and Vega train Azuma and all the other psychics to defeat Genma and thwart his destructive plans. However, despite initial victories, the manga ends in an ambiguous cliffhanger, hinting that the psychics are defeated and the Earth will be destroyed.

After the premature end of the manga, the story was expanded upon by other series of the franchise, featuring time travel and battles in other realities. This is first shown in the sequel New Genma Wars, which takes place in 1999, after Genma's victory has turned the Earth into a post-apocalyptic wasteland ruled by the demon (although possibly an alternate continuity to the original, given that Jō Azuma doesn't seem to exist here). In that place, a surviving psychic named Chinami Kagawa is entasked by Beatrice, princess Luna's daughter, to travel back to the Edo period and create a new clan of psychics who could defeat Genma. She is opposed there by Yui Shōsetsu, who has fused with an incarnation of Genma come to chase Kagawa. (This series also ties with a previously unrelated Hirai manga, Adult Wolf Guy.)

The story is taken then to True Genma Wars, after Kagawa's exploits rewrote reality. In a new version of 1979, Jō Azuma, now an adult paranormal researcher and writer, is hired by a powerful woman known as Moonlight to expose the existence of psychics to the world. After several events, Jō gains the knowledge of the previous timeline destroyed by Genma and his own life there, only to disappear mysteriously. His mantle is taken by his secretary Yuri Sugimura, who travels to the 7th century to meet the mystic En no Gyōja. Also, in another time plane, an ancient Greek girl named Chronos gets involved in a war against Mu, an ancient civilization populated by mysterious beasts who might be related to Genma.

The next installment is Genma Wars: The Eve of Myth, though it takes place again in the original timeline, where the world was conquered by Genma. Humans now live in primitive societies, while the planet is ruled by a race of intelligent Genma beasts serving Maoh King, who now plans to give birth to an heir by raping a human woman. However, said woman, Non, manages to run away with the resultant children, two male twins named Loof and Jin, who swear to stop their father. After defeating Maoh, they travel to the past in an attempt to prevent the existence of their terrible world, but agents of Genma from the past spoil their plan by provoking a nuclear war in substitution of the original Genma victory. Nonetheless, Loof and Jin take over the new timeline, ensuring a better future for mankind there.

A Hirai novel of 1979 similarly named Genma Wars takes a new route from New Genma Wars. being set on a timeline created there. A young version of Jō discovers in 1967 he has psychic powers which predict the coming of Genma, so he initiates a resistance movement from his school's literature club, named "Genken". As in the previous story, Jō disappears mysteriously, and the members of Genken are left to advance by themselves. In a sequel named Harmageddon, a member named Keisuke Takatori gives birth to a totalitary global movement based on his messiah complex.

Harmageddon Girl is a side story of Genma Wars featuring Michiko, Jō Azuma's sister. She uncovers her own powers to save herself and a plane full of passengers from an attack by Genma, but is sent to ancient Greece as a result. Here, she meets Chronos, who leads her to space in order to gather with several other characters of the franchise, among them Luna. At the end of the story, they get ready to battle Genma in his invasion of Earth.

The entire franchise is revisited in a 2014 manga named Genma Wars Rebirth and written by Kyōichi Nanatsuki. In it, Luna and Stella (Luna's daughter with Jō) travel to the past in order to try to prevent the war.

== Characters ==
- Vega

Voiced by: Tōru Emori (Japanese); John Hollywood (English)
A 2000-year-old warrior cyborg who fought several times against Genma in the past. He was summoned by Princess Luna to help defend Earth from evil. His name is written as Bega in international releases.

- Luna

Voiced by: Mami Koyama (Japanese); Wendy Walker (English)
A Transylvanian princess with telepathic powers to see the future.

- Jō Azuma (東 丈, Azuma Jō)

Voiced by: Tōru Furuya (Japanese); Eric Lamp (English)
Jō has been repeated in countless anime, but was not really a prevalent archetype before Harmagedon. He can move objects with his psychic powers.

- Yogin

Voiced by: Ryūji Saikachi (Japanese); B. Jaye Driscoll (English)
An elderly psionic warrior from India who is wise and shows no fear of destruction.

- Tao

Voiced by: Tomoyo Harada (Japanese); Sky Watkins (English)
A psionic warrior from China; a female child disciplined in martial arts who is friends with Jō.

- Sonny Lynx

Voiced by: Yasufumi Hayashi (Japanese); Nefta Perry (English)
A psionic warrior and a teenaged gang boss from New York City who has the power to teleport and phase through walls.

- Asanshi

Voiced by: Hideyuki Tanaka (Japanese); Michael Donovan (English)
An adult psionic warrior from Saudi Arabia.

- Salamander

Voiced by: Kenji Utsumi (Japanese); Richard Epcar (English)
The final psionic warrior, an adult Native American from Nevada.

- Junko Sawakawa

Voiced by: Keiko Han (Japanese); unknown actress (English)
Jō's girlfriend, who breaks up with him early in the movie.

- Shirō Eda

Voiced by: Kaneto Shiozawa (Japanese); Jeff Eigen (English)
Jō's best friend at school, who is skeptical on the existence of ESP.

- Michiko Azuma

Voiced by: Masako Ikeda (Japanese); Meryl Pam Cooper (English)
Jō's older sister, and apparently his guardian. Jō is very attached to her.

- Zamedi

Voiced by: Junpei Takiguchi (Japanese); Russell Arendt (English)
An evil servant of Genma Daioh.

- Zambi

Voiced by: Ichirô Nagai (Japanese); Matt Black (English)
Another evil servant of Genma Daioh.

- Genma Daioh (Genma the Great)

Voiced by: Masaharu Sato (Japanese); Ward Perry (English)
The story's villain.

== Anime film ==
Genma Wars: Har-Magedon (幻魔大戦 ‒ハルマゲドン‒, Genma Taisen: Harumagedon) is a science fiction anime movie released in 1983, based largely on the first Genma Wars volumes. The movie was directed by Rintaro, with character designs by Katsuhiro Otomo. Kadokawa (as spearheaded by Haruki Kadokawa, the president of the company) and Madhouse produced the animation.

Keith Emerson was hired as the music director and composer of the ending theme. "Children of the Light" is the ending theme for Harmagedon, composed and sung by Rosemary Butler, Keith Emerson and others.

The Genma Wars movie has been available in the North America as Harmagedon on VHS and Laserdisc since 1992 and has been released on DVD twice, all by Central Park Media, once as a very early, barebones, DVD release and a second time as a more robust release complete with a Rintaro commentary track.

=== Reception ===
It was 1983's highest-grossing anime film and eighth highest-grossing Japanese film, earning a distribution rental income of ¥1.06 billion. The film's total gross receipts were ¥1.8 billion at the Japanese box office.

Katsuhiro Otomo, who was previously known for the manga Akira (1982), was inspired to become an anime film director after his work on Harmagedon. This led to him making his directorial debut with the anime film Neo Tokyo (1987), before directing the influential 1988 anime film adaptation of Akira.

Capcom artist and designer Akira Yasuda said the initial inspiration for Chun-Li in the fighting game Street Fighter II (1991) came from the anime film Harmagedon: Genma Wars. The Chinese female character Tao was the initial basis for the character design of Chun-Li.

== Anime series ==
Genma Wars: The Chronicle of the Eve of Myth (幻魔大戦 ‒神話前夜の章‒, Genma Taisen: Shinwa Zen'ya no Shō) is an anime television series that aired in Japan in 2002. It has been released in the US under the name Genma Wars by Media Blasters on DVD, later re-released in a box set of the entire series. The release experienced controversy, as the licensor Enoki Films edited some footage to remove panning camera shots of female nudity, but strangely left rape and sex scenes intact.

Unlike the Harmagedon movie, which adapted the original manga, the series adapts the Genma Wars: The Eve of Myth manga by Ishinomori published in Tokuma Shoten from May 1979 to November 1981. It ran for four volumes and was Ishinomori's last work in the franchise.

=== Plot ===
Genma Wars is set in a post-apocalyptic world, where mankind has been subjugated by a demonical tribe known as Genma. The humans are reduced to little more than slaves for the Genma, who employ mutant armies of cyclopses, vampires, werewolves, highly intelligent simian soldiers, and other mythological beings, to keep the humans at bay. The authoritarian Genma leader, the Maoh King, desires to have an heir with immense, extraordinary power. He orders his men around the kingdom to abduct human women. The Maoh King is convinced that if he conceives a child with a human woman the child will possess amazing powers.

In one case, in exchange for the safety of her village, a girl called Non submit to the Maoh King, and give birth to male twins, Loof and Jin. Loof is taken to grow up among the Genma, while Jin grows up under his mother' care, however she is labelled as a whore by her fellow kinsmen. Eventually, Loof and Jin encounter each other and plan revenge against their hated father. However, their father reveals he only created them, and the whole hybrid Human-Genma, to bring the war across the Earth, out of boredom. He throws his sons in a time portal, back to the present time, when the war was initiated, in order to stop their dystopic world.

=== Characters ===
- Loof

Voiced by: Kenji Nomura (Japanese); Bryce Papenbrook (English)
One of the main protagonists, he is one of the twins, child to the Maoh King and Non. He is relatively cool-headed and reasonable. In the beginning, he acts very cold towards humans but his attitude softens after falling in love with Meena.

- Jin

Voiced by: Daisuke Namikawa (Japanese); Bryan Moran (English)
One of the main protagonists, he is Loof's younger twin brother. Unlike Loof, Jin is impulsive, violent and prone to lash out against anyone at any time. This is because he grew up persecuted by both her mother's own people and the Genma's mutant army. Jin develops the desire to become his father's successor as a punishment of his persecution early in his life.

- Maoh King

Voiced by: Motomu Kiyokawa (Japanese); Richard Epcar (English)
Jin and Loof's father, and Earth's ruler. He is also a rapist, prone to order the kidnapping of several females to rape and impregnate them with his child, but he abandons both his child and estranged wife.

- Meena

Voiced by: Fumiko Orikasa (Japanese); Wendee Lee (English)
Loof's human female companion and later romantic interest. He falls in love with her and saves her from several perils. Meena is also a Hito like Loof's mother, although is shown to have mysterious powers. She becomes pregnant with Loof's child. However, she dies after saving Loof from a mutant enemy.

- Parome

Voiced by: Tomoko Hirasuji (Japanese); Ellyn Stern (English)
The Maoh Queen, she is some kind of a Wicked Queen, and is very jealous towards her husband for indiscriminately raping and impregnating human girls, just to have a powerful baby, claiming if he had a baby with Parome, it would be weak. As the series advances, she grows insane and plans to overthrow her husband. When Jin and Loof attack their stronghold, Parome is presumably destroyed, but returns when the Maoh King appears to have the upper hand in the fight against his children, and she uses the last of her forces to impale the King in the chest using a sword, destroying them both.

== Bega's Battle ==
Data East produced a LaserDisc video game as a tie-in to the animated movie, entitled Genma Taisen in Japan and Bega's Battle in North America. The game was announced in March 1983, when it was the second LaserDisc game to be announced (following Sega's Astron Belt). It was released for arcades in June 1983. It uses a Sony LaserDisc player, which plays video footage from the film. In the game, the player takes on the role of the robot Bega (Vega) whose goal was to stop the invasion forces of the alien Varga (Genma), while also rescuing his three friends who have been kidnapped by them.

Similar to Astron Belt, the game used the footage mainly for backgrounds, while the actual gameplay was a shooting game with sprites laid over the video. Bega's Battle also used brief full-motion video (FMV) cut scenes to develop a story between the game's shooting stages. Years later, this would become the standard approach to video game storytelling. Bega's Battle also featured a branching storyline. The Twin Galaxies world record for Bega's Battle was set by Steve Harris (later the founder of Electronic Gaming Monthly) on July 18, 1983.

In Japan, Game Machine listed Bega's Battle on their November 1, 1983, issue as being the third most-successful upright arcade/cockpit unit of the month. In North America, the game was not commercially successful, with a number of arcade cabinets later converted into the more successful Cobra Command (1984). Even among LaserDisc games, Bega's Battle has become somewhat rare, because many of the machines were converted into Cobra Command machines as part of a discount deal offered by Data East in exchange for the internals of the Bega's Battle arcade cabinet.
