= Public intoxication =

Drunk in the public sphere

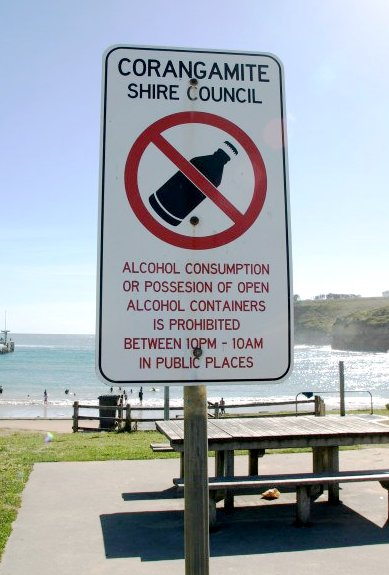
A sign prohibiting the drinking of alcohol in a public place in Victoria, Australia

Public intoxication, also known as "drunk and disorderly" and "drunk in public", is a summary offense in certain countries related to public cases or displays of drunkenness. Public intoxication laws vary widely by jurisdiction, but usually require an obvious display of intoxicated incompetence or behavior which disrupts public order before the charge is levied.

== Americas ==
=== Barbados ===
Under Barbados law, liquor licensees are responsible for drunkenness or disorderly conduct on their premises and the Barbados Police Force can be asked to evict drunken individuals from public establishments. There has not been significant litigation.

=== Brazil ===
In Brazil, it is legal and usually socially acceptable to drink alcohol in public areas. Being publicly intoxicated is a misdemeanor, but laws are rarely, if ever, enforced.

=== Canada ===
In Canada, liquor is regulated by the provinces rather than the federal government.

In British Columbia and Ontario, drinking in public and public intoxication are offenses. Permits are required for events in public places that involve alcohol. In Ontario, having an open container in public garners a $125 fine and public drunkenness garners a $65 fine and detainment until sober. While liquor laws are similar in provinces, the laws in territories tend to be substantially different. For instance, in the Northwest Territories public intoxication can result in imprisonment or detention in a medical facility for up to 24 hours (NWT Liquor Act).

=== Chile ===
In Chile, it is illegal to drink alcohol in any public place or unlicensed facilities. The law may or may not be enforced, depending on the location, time of the day and the behavior of the offender.

Penalties may include the confiscation or seizure of the alcoholic beverage, fines or arrest.

=== United States ===
Drinking alcohol in public places, such as streets and parks, is against the law in most of the United States, though there is no specific federal law that forbids the consumption of alcohol in public. Some states, such as Nevada, do not criminalize public intoxication at all (though excessive drunkenness can often lead to other alcohol-related crimes). There are some cities that allow exceptions: two notable examples being New Orleans, Louisiana (consumption in the streets is legal, but only in plastic containers) and Butte, Montana (which allows public consumption for a certain number of hours throughout the day).

Alcohol intoxication is not necessary in order to get an individual to be charged with public intoxication as a crime:

... under most public intoxication laws, the individual charged with the offense does not actually have to be drunk. Instead, he or she need only appear to be drunk or be acting in a disorderly manner. This is because the crime is meant to protect against a public environment that threatens or intimidates others, or discourages them from using public spaces. Accordingly, an individual who is not actually drunk, but is acting in such a manner, can be charged with the crime.

==== 1968 constitutional challenge ====
In 1968, in the case of Powell v. Texas, the Texas law against public intoxication was challenged in the Supreme Court of the United States for alleged violation of Eighth Amendment, which forbids cruel and unusual punishment. The court upheld the law, ruling that criminalizing public intoxication was neither cruel nor unusual.

==== State public intoxication laws today ====
Alcohol by states mentioned
- California: California Penal Code 647(f) considers public intoxication a misdemeanor. The code describes public intoxication as someone who displays intoxication to liquor, drugs, controlled substances, or toluene and demonstrates an inability to care for themselves or others, or interferes or obstructs the free use of streets, sidewalks or other public way. California Penal Code 647(g) affords law enforcement the option to take an individual fitting the arrest criteria for 647(f), and no other crime, into civil protective custody if a "sobering facility" is available. Often, this manifests in the form of a so-called drunk tank. Essentially, the detainee agrees to remain at the location until the facility's staff consents to their departure; usually after four hours and upon the belief that the detainee is safe to look after themselves. Not every municipality in California has such a facility. Also, if a person is being combative and/or is under the influence of drugs, they will be taken to a jail. Unlike a person who is taken to jail, a civil detainee under 647(g) is not later prosecuted in a court of law.
- Colorado: Public intoxication in the state of Colorado is not punished with criminal or civil penalties. Instead, state law prohibits the passing of local laws that penalize public intoxication, but state law provides for the creation of patrols trained to provide assistance to intoxicated and incapacitated people.
- Georgia: In Georgia, public intoxication is a class B misdemeanor. Public intoxication is defined as a person who shall be and appear in an intoxicated condition in any public place or within the curtilage of any private residence not his own other than by invitation of the owner or lawful occupant, which condition is made manifest by boisterousness, by indecent condition or act, or by vulgar, profane, loud, or unbecoming language.
- Indiana: In Indiana, public intoxication is a class B misdemeanor, punishable with up to 180 days in jail, and a $1,000 fine. As of 2012, simply being intoxicated in public is no longer a crime. The person must also be, (1) endangering the person's life; (2) endangering the life of another person;(3) breaching the peace or is in imminent danger of breaching the peace; or (4) is harassing, annoying, or alarming another person. (See IC 7.1-5-1-3).
- Iowa: The Code of Iowa Sec 123.46 states that "a person shall not be intoxicated or simulate intoxication in a public place". Public Intoxication is a Simple Misdemeanor punishable by a maximum of 30 days' jail and a $1,000 fine. Aggravated Public Intoxication (3rd or subsequent Offense) is an Aggravated Misdemeanor punishable by a maximum of 2 years in prison. As of 2013, Johnson County, home of the University of Iowa had the highest arrest rate for public intoxication of any county in the state, at 8.28 per 1,000 residents.
- Kansas: Being drunk in public in Kansas is not a criminal offense. Kansas statute 65-4059 states "No county or city shall adopt any local law, ordinance, resolution or regulation having the force of law rendering public intoxication by alcohol in and of itself or being a common drunkard or being found in enumerated places in an intoxicated condition, an offense, a violation, or the subject of criminal penalties."
- Minnesota: Public intoxication is not a crime in Minnesota. However, cities can enact laws against public intoxication, such as the City of St. Cloud.
- Missouri has no state public intoxication law. Missouri's permissive alcohol laws both protect people from suffering any criminal penalty (including arrest) for the mere act of being drunk in public, and prohibit local jurisdictions from enacting criminal public intoxication laws on their own.
- Montana state law states that public intoxication is not a crime. However, the law allows law enforcement to take an intoxicated person home, or to detain them, if they are a danger to themselves or others. The law also states that no record can be made that indicates the person was arrested or detained for being intoxicated.
- Nevada has no state public intoxication law. Nevada state law both protects people from suffering any criminal penalty (including arrest) for the mere act of being drunk in public, and prohibits local jurisdictions from enacting criminal public intoxication laws on their own.
- Oregon: The state has no laws against public intoxication and actively bans local intoxication ordinances in §430.402. "However, if the person is incapacitated, the health of the person appears to be in immediate danger, or the police have reasonable cause to believe the person is dangerous to self or to any other person, the person shall be taken by the police to an appropriate treatment facility." § 430.399
- Texas: Public intoxication is a Class C misdemeanor (Class C misdemeanors are punishable by fine only not to exceed $500). However, if the offender is a minor, harsher penalties apply (especially if a two-time prior offender in which case jail time can be ordered). Section 49.01 of the Penal Code, which legally defines "intoxication", includes both a blood alcohol content greater than 0.08 but also defines it as "not having the normal use of mental or physical faculties by reason of the introduction of alcohol, a controlled substance, a drug, a dangerous drug, a combination of two or more of those substances, or any other substance into the body"; thus, a breathalyzer or field sobriety test is not required to prove public intoxication. This low standard of proof has led to criticism that officers are using "public intoxication" as a means of harassment, especially towards minority groups.
- Virginia criminalizes public intoxication under section 18.2-388 of the Code of Virginia. It is punishable by a fine of up to $250.
- Wisconsin also does not have a state public intoxication law although municipalities may pass city ordinances prohibiting public intoxication. Public intoxication is legal in Milwaukee; however, public drinking is not.

In summary, misconducting in public while drunk could be fined in California, Georgia, Indiana, Iowa, Texas and Virginia.

== Asia ==
=== Singapore ===
From 1 April 2015, public drinking was banned from 10:30 p.m. to 7 a.m. daily.

Additional restrictions on public drinking are applied to Geylang and Little India which are declared Liquor Control Zones. The additional restrictions for Geylang and Little India are from 10:30 p.m. on Fridays to 7 a.m. on Mondays and from 7 p.m. on the day before public holidays to 7 a.m. on the day after the public holiday. Retailers within the Liquor Control Zones are not allowed to sell takeaway liquor from 10:30 p.m. to 7 a.m. on weekdays (except on the day before public holidays and the day of public holidays) and from 7 p.m. to 7 a.m. on weekends, on the day before public holidays and on the day of public holidays. Retailers and F&B outlets are not allowed to sell liquor from 10:30 p.m. to 7 a.m. daily.

== Europe ==
According to data from the World Health Organization, drinking in public is regulated in the European countries for which data was provided as follows:

- Educational buildings:
  - ban: Cyprus, Czech Republic, Finland, Hungary, Latvia, Lithuania, Luxembourg, Poland, Romania, Slovakia, Slovenia, Spain
  - partial restriction: Belgium, Estonia, France, Ireland, Italy, Malta, Netherlands, Sweden
  - voluntary/self restricted: Austria, Bulgaria, Denmark, Germany, UK
  - no restrictions: Greece
- Government offices:
  - ban: Cyprus, Czech Republic, Finland, Hungary, Latvia, Poland, Romania, Slovakia, Slovenia
  - partial restriction: France, Lithuania, Malta, Netherlands, Portugal, Spain
  - voluntary/self restricted: Austria, Belgium, Bulgaria, Denmark, Germany, Ireland, Italy, Sweden
  - no restrictions: Estonia, Greece, Luxembourg, UK
- Healthcare establishments:
  - ban: Cyprus, Czech Republic, Finland, Hungary, Latvia, Lithuania, Malta, Portugal, Romania, Slovenia
  - partial restriction: Belgium, France, Italy, Netherlands, Spain
  - voluntary/self restricted: Austria, Bulgaria, Germany, Ireland, Luxembourg, Poland, Sweden, UK
  - no restrictions: Denmark, Greece
- Leisure events:
  - ban:
  - partial restriction: Cyprus, Czech Republic, Finland, France, Ireland, Portugal, Romania, UK
  - voluntary/self restricted: Austria, Belgium, Bulgaria, Germany, Latvia, Poland, Slovakia, Sweden
  - no restrictions: Denmark, Estonia, Greece, Hungary, Luxembourg, Slovenia, Spain
- Parks and streets:
  - ban: Estonia, Lithuania, Latvia, Poland, Romania
  - partial restriction: Cyprus, Czech Republic, Finland, France, Ireland, Italy, Malta, Netherlands, Portugal, Slovakia, Spain, UK
  - voluntary/self restricted: Austria, Belgium, Bulgaria, Germany, Slovenia, Sweden
  - no restrictions: Greece, Hungary, Luxembourg
- Public transport:
  - ban: Cyprus, Finland, France, Greece, Romania, Slovakia
  - partial restriction: Czech Republic, Denmark, Estonia, Hungary, Ireland, Lithuania, Malta, Netherlands, Poland, Portugal, Sweden, UK
  - voluntary/self restricted: Austria, Belgium, Bulgaria, Germany
  - no restrictions: Italy, Luxembourg, Slovenia, Spain
- Places of worship:
  - ban: Cyprus, Finland, Romania
  - partial restriction: France, Portugal
  - voluntary/self restricted: Belgium, Bulgaria, Czech Republic, Hungary, Ireland, Latvia, Malta, Sweden
  - no restrictions: Austria, Denmark, Estonia, Germany, Greece, Italy, Lithuania, Luxembourg, Netherlands, Slovakia, Slovenia, Spain, UK
- Sporting events:
  - ban: Romania, Slovenia, Spain
  - partial restriction: Cyprus, Czech Republic, Finland, France, Greece, Hungary, Ireland, Italy, Lithuania, Malta, Netherlands, UK
  - voluntary/self restricted: Austria, Belgium, Bulgaria, Germany, Latvia, Slovakia, Sweden
  - no restrictions: Denmark, Estonia, Luxembourg
- Workplaces:
  - ban: Czech Republic, Finland, Hungary, Latvia, Lithuania, Poland, Romania, Slovakia, Slovenia
  - partial restriction: Cyprus, France, Italy, Malta, Portugal, Spain
  - voluntary/self restricted: Austria, Belgium, Bulgaria, Denmark, Germany, Ireland, Netherlands, Sweden, UK
  - no restrictions: Estonia, Greece, Luxembourg

Legend:

- ban = the consumption of alcohol is prohibited by law, violation may result in punishment.
- partial restriction = in some states, regions, municipalities or cities the consumption of alcohol is prohibited by law; or consumption is restricted at certain places but not generally prohibited.
- voluntary/self-restricted = the consumption of alcohol is not prohibited by law, but (some) establishments may have own regulations prohibiting or regulating the consumption of alcohol voluntarily.
- no restrictions = the consumption of alcohol is legal.

=== United Kingdom ===
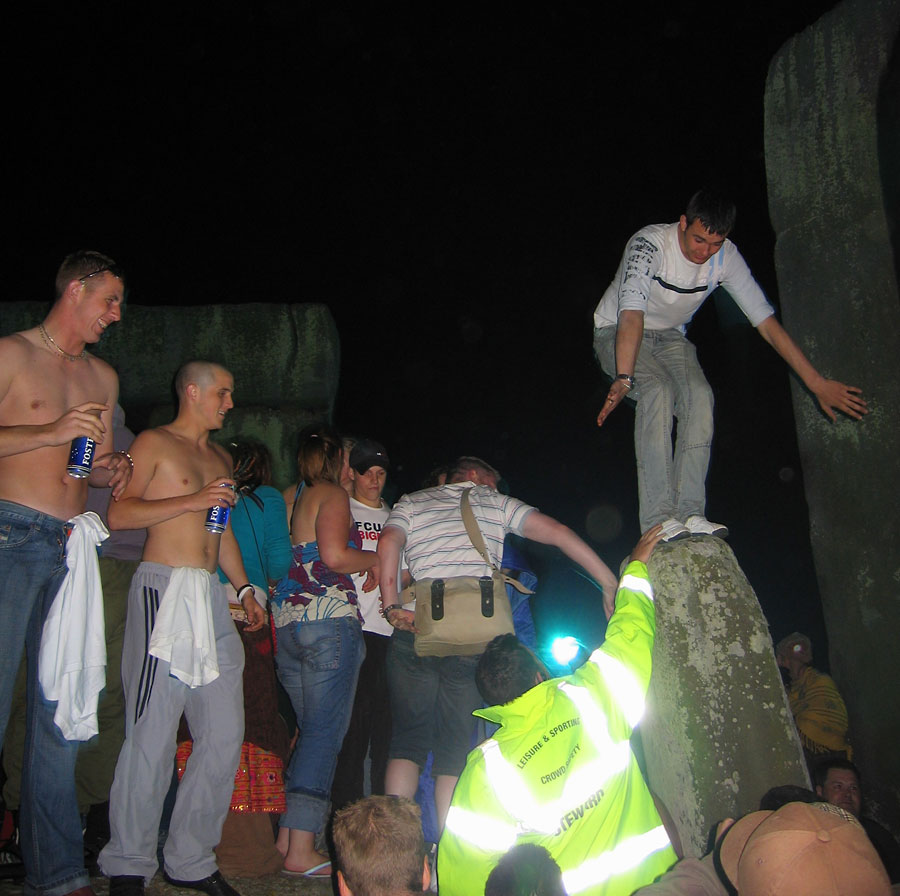
In the United Kingdom, the police normally only enforce the laws against public intoxication if the intoxicated person is unable to act in a reasonable manner, as demonstrated by such activities as climbing on Stonehenge (pictured).

In the United Kingdom, there are a number of offences dealing with intoxication, which vary between the constituent countries.

In a public place, it is an offence to be:

- drunk (except in Scotland, where public drunkenness is nonetheless likely to be considered a breach of the peace)
- drunk and disorderly or, in Scotland, to behave in a disorderly manner while drunk

It is also an offence to be drunk:

- while boarding, or while on board, an aircraft
- in England and Wales, while in charge of a child under 7 years old
- in England and Wales, while travelling to a "designated sporting event" (usually professional football matches) on public transport or a vehicle with eight seats or more
- in England and Wales, while in, or attempting to enter, a "designated sporting ground" (a football ground) during a designated sporting event.

While drunk, it is an offence:

- on licensed premises, for any person to sell the drunk person alcohol, or to procure alcohol for them
- in Scotland, to attempt to enter licensed premises.

The police will only get involved if the person is so drunk they are unable to act in a reasonable manner, such as passing out on the street. In that case, typically the police will, depending on the circumstances, help the intoxicated person on their way or place the person in a police station cell until sober. Once fit to be dealt with the detained person will normally either be cautioned, be issued with a penalty notice for disorder (PND – £90 fine in ticket form), or bailed to appear at the local court. The court in turn may issue a fine (up to level 1 or level 3 on the standard scale depending on the offence charged).

Furthermore, in England and Wales the police have the power (although not the obligation) to confiscate any alcohol which is being consumed in public by those under 18, and local authorities have the power to prohibit alcohol consumption in certain areas.

== Oceania ==
=== Australia ===
The Royal Commission into Aboriginal Deaths in Custody (1987–1991) found public drunkenness disproportionately affected Aboriginal people. Public drunkenness was decriminalised in New South Wales in 1979, in South Australia in 1984.

In New South Wales, being intoxicated in a public place is not, by itself, a criminal offence. However, police may give an intoxicated person a direction to leave a public place where the person's behaviour is disorderly, poses a risk to public safety, is likely to cause injury or may result in property damage. Failure to comply with such a direction without a reasonable excuse is an offence. Intoxicated behaviour may also constitute offensive conduct under section 4 of the Summary Offences Act 1988 if it occurs in or near a public place or school and is considered sufficiently offensive according to contemporary community standards. The offence carries a maximum penalty of six penalty units or three months' imprisonment and may instead be dealt with by a penalty notice. Separate rules apply to licensed premises, where an intoxicated, violent, quarrelsome or disorderly person may be required to leave. Refusing to leave, attempting to re-enter within 24 hours or remaining near the premises may attract an on-the-spot fine of $550 for each offence or a maximum court-imposed fine of $5,500. In an alcohol-free zone, police may confiscate and dispose of alcohol being consumed, although drinking in the zone does not itself attract a fine.

By legislative changes in February 2021, Victoria will finally decriminalise public drunkenness from November 2022, after which drunkenness will be treated as a public health issue, not a criminal one. In Victoria, there are currently two drinking offences: "drunk in a public place" and "drunk and disorderly in a public place". These are separate offences contained in the Summary Offences Act 1966 which have their own power of arrest. Changes in 2006 allow police to issue an infringement notice for these offences, in addition to the traditional method of charging and bailing the offender to the Magistrates' Court. The current fine attached to the infringement notice is $590 for a first offence and $1,100 for a subsequent offence. A person arrested for being drunk or drunk and disorderly is held at the Melbourne Custody Centre or the cells at a police station or placed in the care of a friend or relative.

Queensland is the only state left within Australia that has a specific criminal offence of public drunkenness still in force. In late 2024, the Northern Territory immediately re-introduced enacted laws to explicitly ban public drunkenness and being a public nuisance as two board stand alone criminal offenses.

=== New Zealand ===
In New Zealand, drinking in public is not a crime. Instead, local governments must specify that alcohol is banned in an area before it is considered a crime to drink in that location. Being drunk in public is not specifically an offense unless the person who is intoxicated is a public nuisance, in which case they may be dealt with for 'disturbing the peace'. This will usually result in being taken home, or otherwise taken to a police cell until sober.

== See also ==
- Alcohol-related crime
- Alcohol law
- Drinking in public
- Drunk walking
- Public-order crime
