= Sergio Della Sala =

Sergio Della Sala FRSE, FRSA, FBPsS
- Born: 23 September 1955 (age 71)
- Occupation: Neuroscientist
- Website: www.ed.ac.uk/profile/sergio-della-sala

Sergio Della Sala FRSE, FRSA, FBPsS (born 23 September 1955) is a medical doctor, clinical neurologist and neuropsychologist.

He studied at the University of Milan; the University of California, Berkeley; and at the MRC Cognition and Brain Sciences Unit in Cambridge (UK).

He held positions in Milan, Perth (Australia), Aberdeen (UK) and as of July 2020 works at the University of Edinburgh as Professor of Human Cognitive Neuroscience. His main field of study is the relationship between brain and behaviour. He is author of over 600 peer-reviewed experimental papers and Editor-in-chief of Cortex.

He is the current President Emeritus of CICAP (Italian Committee for the Investigation of Claims of the Pseudosciences).

== Books ==
- (editor), Mind Myths: Exploring Popular Assumptions About the Mind and Brain, Wiley, 1999
- Miti della mente, Monduzzi 2006
- with Nicoletta Beschin, Il cervello ferito, Giunti 2006
- with Michaela Dewar, Mai fidarsi della mente. N+1 esperimenti per capire come ci inganna e perché, Laterza 2010 e 2011
- Perché dimentichiamo. Una scienza dell'oblio, Feltrinelli 2025
