= List of psychic abilities =

Extrasensory phenomena

This is a list of psychic abilities attributed to real-world people. Many of these abilities pertain to variations of extrasensory perception or the sixth sense. Superhuman abilities from fiction are not included.

== Psychic abilities ==
- Abhijñā - Buddhist higher knowledge.
- Aerokinesis – The ability to control air and wind.
- Astral projection or mental projection – The ability to voluntarily project an astral body or mental body, being associated with the out-of-body experience, in which one's consciousness or a state of day dream-like experience imagines a future state of one's being.
- Atmokinesis – The ability to regulate the weather by "calling" for snow, rain, or sunshine.
- Automatic writing – The ability to draw or write without conscious intent.
- Bilocation – The ability to be present in two different places at the same time, usually attributed to a saint.
- Biokinesis - The ability to control any form of life from a single nucleotide to an entire ecosystem simultaneously.
- Chlorokinesis – The ability to mentally and/or physically summon, control and manipulate plants and vegetation.
- Cryokinesis – The ability to control ice or cold with one's mind.
- Curse – Any expressed wish that some form of adversity or misfortune will befall or attach to one or more persons, a place, or an object.
- Electrokinesis – The ability to control all form of electricity.
- Energy medicine – The ability to heal with empathic, etheric, astral, mental or spiritual energy.
- Ergokinesis – The ability to influence the movement of energy, such as electricity, without direct interaction.
- Geokinesis – The ability to control all form of earthly materials.
- Hydrokinesis – The ability to control water with one's mind.
- Iddhi – Psychic abilities gained through Buddhist meditation.
- Illusions – The ability to conjure up illusions from one's mind.
- Inedia – The purported ability to survive without eating or drinking.
- Invisibility – The ability to turn oneself invisible.
- Levitation or transvection – The ability to float or fly by mystical means.
- Materialization – The creation of objects and material or the appearance of matter from unknown sources derived from deep enlightenment and thought.
- Mediumship or channeling – The ability to communicate with spirits of those passed on to the afterlife.
- Mind control – The ability to control someone's mind.
- Memory librarian - the ability to access and store the spirit's memories
- Petrification – The power to turn a living being to stone by looking them in the eye.
- Photokinesis – The ability to control lights.
- Phytokinesis – The ability to control plants with one's mind.
- Prophecy (also prediction, premonition, or prognostication) – the ability to foretell events without using induction or deduction from known facts.
- Psychic surgery – The ability to remove disease or disorder within or over the body tissue via an "energetic" disruption that heals immediately afterward.
- Pyrokinesis – The ability to control flames, fire, or heat using one's mind.
- Psychic hold – The ability to throw an electric current like a rope.
- Siddhi - Psychic abilities gained through Hindu meditation.
- Telekinesis or Psychokinesis – The ability to influence a physical system without physical interaction, typically manifesting as being able to exert force, control objects and move matter with one's mind.
- Teleportation – The ability is the hypothetical transfer of matter or energy from one point to another without traversing the physical space between them.
- Thoughtography – The ability to impress an image by 'burning' it on a surface using one's mind only.
- Umbrakinesis – The ability to shape, create, and control shadows and darkness.
- Witnessing – The gift of being visited by high-profile spiritual beings such as Mary, Jesus or Fudosama (Acala).
- Xenoglossy – The ability of a person to suddenly learn to write and speak a foreign language without any natural means such as studying or research, but that is often rather bestowed by divine agents.

=== Extrasensory perception ===
Extrasensory perception, or sixth sense, isn't an ability in itself and comprises a set of abilities.

- Remote viewing, telesthesia or remote sensing – The ability to see a distant or unseen target using extrasensory perception.
- Dermo-optical perception – The ability to perceive unusual sensory stimuli through the skin.
- Dowsing – The ability to locate water, sometimes using a tool called a dowsing rod.
- Precognition (including psychic premonitions) – The ability to perceive or gain knowledge about future events without using induction or deduction from known facts.
- Psychometry or psychoscopy – The ability to obtain information about a person or an object by touch.
- Retrocognition or postcognition – The ability to supernaturally perceive past events.
- Telepathy – The ability to transmit or receive thoughts supernaturally.
