= CICAP =

Italian skeptic organization

Comitato Italiano per il Controllo delle Affermazioni sulle Pseudoscienze
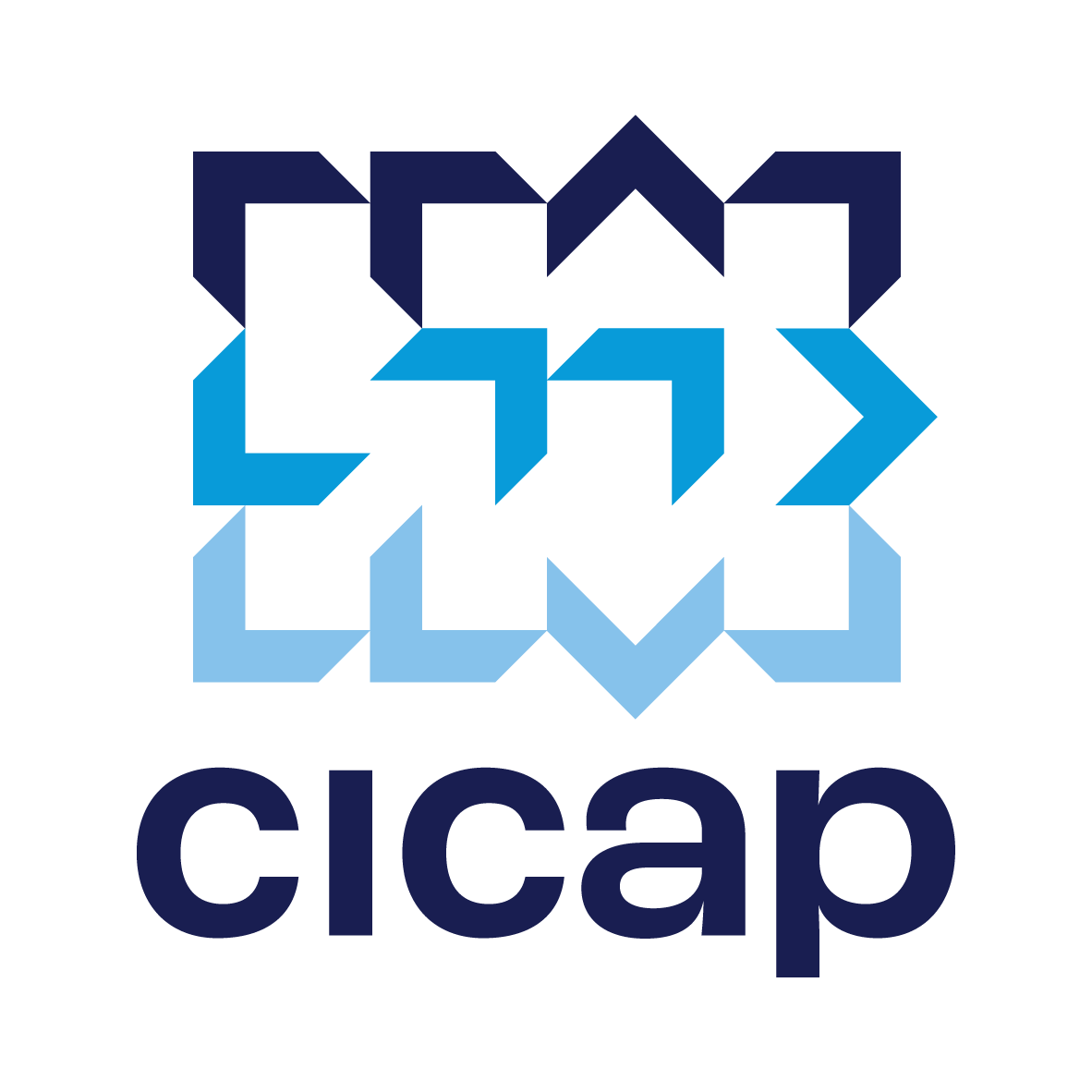
- Abbreviation: CICAP
- Formation: 1989; 37 years ago
- Type: NGO
- Purpose: Scientific skepticism
- Location: Padua, Italy
- Region served: Italy
- Official language: Italian
- President: Sergio Della Sala
- Key people: Massimo Polidoro (executive director)
- Affiliations: European Council of Skeptical Organisations
- Website: www.cicap.org

The Italian Committee for the Investigation of Claims on Pseudosciences (Italian: Comitato Italiano per il Controllo delle Affermazioni sulle Pseudoscienze; CICAP) is an Italian non-profit skeptical educational organization, founded in 1989. CICAP's main goal is to promote a scientific and critical investigation of pseudosciences, the paranormal, so-called mysteries and the unusual, with the aim of encouraging a more scientific attitude and critical thinking.

It is a member of the European Council of Skeptical Organisations.

== History ==
CICAP was founded by the Italian science journalist Piero Angela together with a group of scientists including Margherita Hack, Tullio Regge and Sergio Della Sala. The first attempt at creating an organization that investigates alleged paranormal phenomena in Italy dates back to 1978, only two years after the founding of CSICOP (today CSI), when following Piero Angela's television show Indagine sulla parapsicologia (Inquiry on Parapsychology), 22 scientists and researchers of various disciplines released a common declaration calling for the establishment of a committee for the examination of alleged paranormal phenomena.

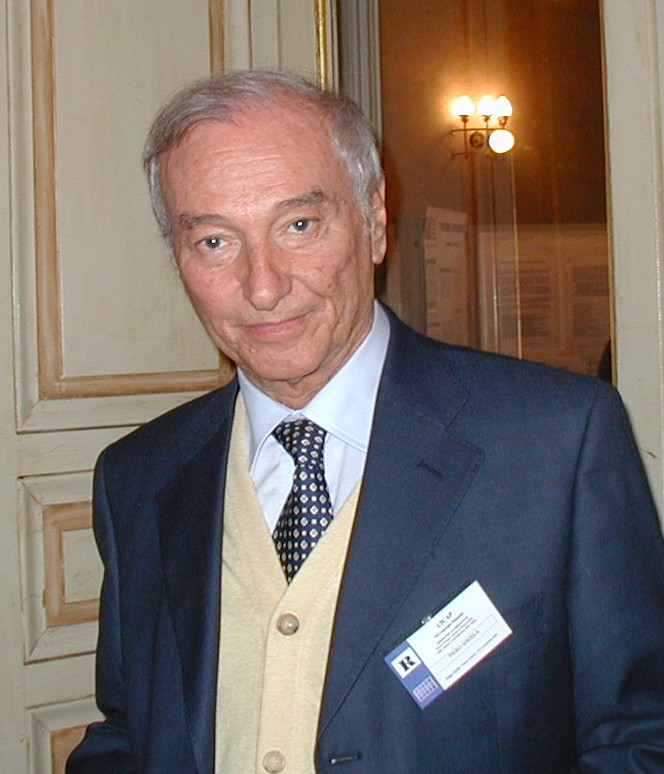
Piero Angela, national convention of CICAP (2001)

The initiative did not come into being until 1987–1988, when Piero Angela organized numerous meetings amongst the Italian subscribers of Skeptical Inquirer magazine that led to an initial public meeting in Turin on 9 October 1988. During the meeting, the association's goals and objectives were defined and the committee was named: Comitato italiano per il controllo delle affermazioni sul paranormale (Italian Committee for the Investigation of Claims of the Paranormal), chosen because its acronym "CICAP" resembled the word "check-up" in English.

The committee was formalized on 12 June 1989. Steno Ferluga was appointed president, Lorenzo Montali secretary and Massimo Polidoro the director of the association's magazine. Two Nobel Prize laureates are or have been members: Carlo Rubbia and Rita Levi Montalcini. Other notable members include the philosopher, semiotician and novelist Umberto Eco.

In the beginning, CICAP was primarily concerned with parapsychology (telepathy, psychokinesis, etc.). With time, CICAP began branching out into other areas of pseudoscience (such as alternative medicine), both historical (such as those involving dragons or the sword in the rock) and above all, contemporary legends (urban legends). The rise in popularity of other pseudoscientific phenomena prompted the organization to change its name. In September 2013, CICAP announced a change in its name altering the P of the acronym to signify pseudoscienze rather than paranormale (paranormal). The new name includes not only supernatural phenomena, but also pseudoscientific ideas and claims regarding practices whose efficacy is not scientifically proven, conspiracy theories, urban legends, and historical falsifications.

A short list of CICAP investigations during its history includes verifying astrological predictions, powers of magicians, dowsers, healers and fakirs, UFOs, the blood of St.Januarius and contacts with the afterlife. CICAP also deals with verifying astrological predictions. In fact, every December, it collects a sample of astrological predictions made by astrologers and clairvoyants during the year and publishes a year-end report on the outcomes of the predictions. Since 2009, CICAP has organised an annual "Anti-Superstition" day in various cities on Friday the 17th.

The organization has always worked closely with Italian media to help ensure accurate coverage of paranormal topics.

In the early 2000s, CICAP purchased its current headquarters in Padua, with the proceeds of a fundraising campaign called "Progetto CICAP 2000".

In October 2004, CICAP and the CSI co-sponsored a World Skeptics Congress in Italy.

CICAP features several local volunteer groups that organize activities such as conferences, investigations and courses for journalists and teachers. The first local group was created in 1994; As of 2020, sixteen local groups are present.

In 2011 CICAP became an Associazione di Promozione Sociale, a form of nonprofit organization that allowed it to claim donations on income tax forms and enabled members to become more involved in the decisions of the association.

In 2015, "thematic groups" were created within CICAP. These work groups are composed of members from across Italy and abroad who focus on a specific project, such as educational activities for schools. In May 2016, Italian science journalist Piero Angela was appointed "honorary president" of CICAP.

Since 2018, CICAP has been acknowledged by the Ministry of Education, University and Research for the training of school staff according to the MIUR 170/2016 Directive.

As of 2020, the president of CICAP is neuroscientist Sergio Della Sala.

== Scope ==
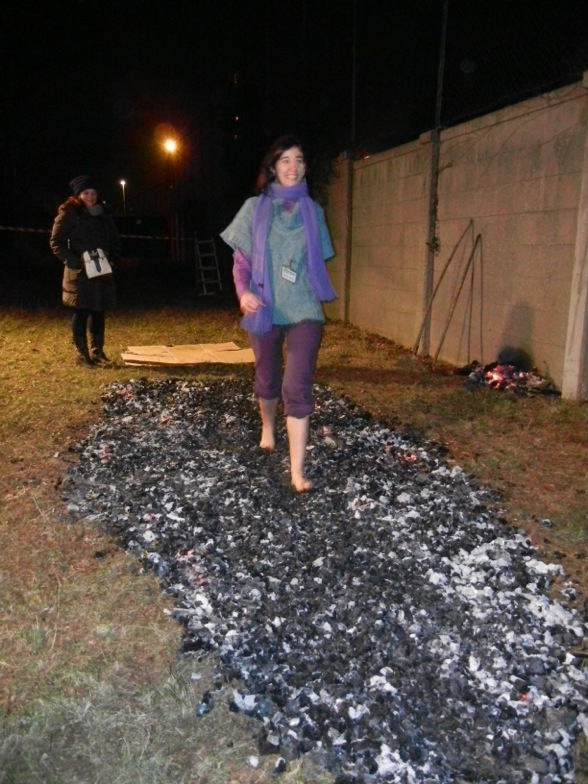
Marta Annunziata fire-walking

The subject matters investigated by CICAP can be divided into three categories:

- Paranormal Phenomena which would violate the fundamental laws of modern science: investigations of parapsychology such as telepathy, precognition, clairvoyance, telekinesis. Other subjects that fall under this category are generally described as "scientifically inexplicable": fire-walking, Electronic voice phenomena (EVP), religious paranormal events, and so on.
- Pseudoscience: those disciplines that claim to be scientifically valid but that systematically elude experimental verification when the scientific method is applied: astrology, alternative medicine, creationism, Earth Radiation, numerology, etc.
- Mysteries and legends: stories that are not strictly paranormal but are unusual such as urban legends, UFOs and alleged alien events such as crop circles, traditional legends such as those involving dragons or the sword in the stone.

== Method ==
CICAP applies rational skepticism and the scientific method in its activities and investigations. This posits that every empirical statement can only be accepted after experimental verification. CICAP often employs the collaboration of illusionists in its investigations to ascertain the possible use of tricks. For example, Silvan is a CICAP sympathizer and has collaborated with CICAP in some of its initiatives.

== Limits ==
CICAP does not cover metaphysics, in particular religion and faith, because these phenomena cannot be studied scientifically. CICAP investigates religious claims regarding material manifestations such as relics or the St. Janarius blood miracle in Naples because these phenomena are subject to scientific examination. CICAP is interested in informing the public. Its members have different religious and political beliefs, but they all agree that alleged pseudoscientific phenomena must be investigated and the results publicized.

== Organization ==
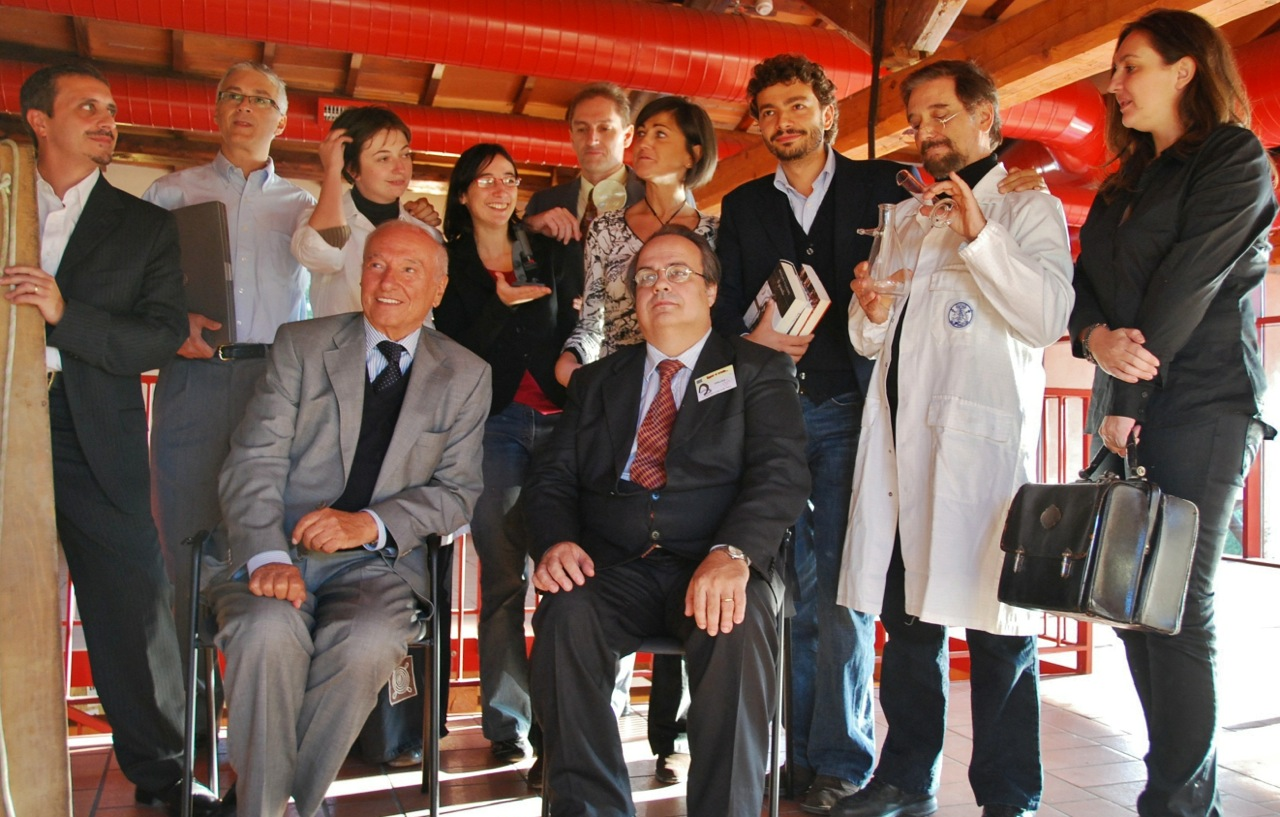
From the left: Francesco Grassi, Marino Franzosi, Beatrice Mautino, Piero Angela, Marta Annunziata, Paolo Attivissimo, Francesca Guizzo, Steno Ferluga, Massimo Polidoro, Luigi Garlaschelli, Paola De Gobbi

The association is self-financed: the main sources of income are registration fees, donations and revenues from publications and courses. Curious, given that his fortune was based on the artistic and literary paranormal, was the adhesion of Tiziano Sclavi, who contributed five million lire. Sclavi is in fact a supporter of CICAP and declared that the occult and paranormal are great in fiction but that reality is a whole other thing.

The national headquarters is located in Padua. Most regions have local groups or chapters with their own CICAP branches. Currently, there are local groups in Abruzzo-Molise, Aosta Valley, Apulia, Campania, Emilia-Romagna, Friuli-Venezia Giulia, Lazio, Liguria, Lombardy, Piedmont, Sardinia, Sicily, Tuscany, Trentino-Alto Adige, Veneto. Furthermore, there is a local group in Canton Ticino, Switzerland.

=== Associative bodies ===
According to the internal statute (article 18), the main associative bodies are the assembly (ordinary or extraordinary), the executive council, the president and the vice-president.

The executive council, whose offices are carried out on a voluntary basis, manages the association. The executive council appoints from among its members a president and a vice president and, optionally, one or more national coordinators. As of 2020, the members of the executive council are Sergio Della Sala (president), Lorenzo Montali (vice president), Andrea Ferrero (coordinator), Marta Annunziata (local groups coordinator), Francesca Guizzo (legal advisor).

The coordinators of the local groups are elected by the active members of the respective regions or provinces, while the effective members are chosen by the board of directors, upon written request by the applicant.

The ordinary assembly, composed of effective members and coordinators of the local groups, approves the budget of the association, appoints and revokes the members of the executive council and other corporate bodies, and deliberates on the general guidelines of the association.

The extraordinary assembly, composed of full members only, deliberates on decisions of particular importance such as changes to the statute and the transformation or dissolution of the association.

=== Local groups ===
CICAP activities are organized within local groups and present on most of the territory. As of 2020, local groups are present in the following regions: Abruzzo-Molise, Apulia, Aosta Valley, Campania, Emilia-Romagna, Friuli-Venezia Giulia (regional group, provincial group of Pordenone), Lazio, Liguria, Lombardy, Piedmont (regional group, provincial group of Cuneo), Sicily, Tuscany, Veneto. There is also a local group in Ticino, Switzerland.

Each local group is managed by a coordinator, elected by the active members of his area, and approved by the Executive Council. The coordinators of all local groups, together with the effective members, take part in the Ordinary Assembly and the election of the Executive Council.

=== Thematic groups ===
Thematic groups were officially founded in 2015, although some of them were already active previously. They are composed of volunteers from all over Italy who collaborate to realize activities on specific topics.

The following thematic groups are active:

- CICAP-Med: started in 2017 to respond with expert advice to questions on pseudoscientific aspects related to health and medical problems in general
- Chiedi Le Prove: it is inspired by the experience of Ask For Evidence for the correct use of scientific information in the media
- Investigations: responds to requests that reach CICAP regarding pseudoscientific claims or mysterious phenomena, by consulting experts and conducting field investigations
- School: aims to carry out educational initiatives in schools, to promote critical thinking and a rational approach to problems
- RadioCICAP: the official podcast where scientific, rational and skeptical topics are dealt with using interviews and insights
- Razionale Alcoolica: Italian version of Skeptics in the Pub. Instead of conferences with a clear separation between speaker and audience, it is composed of meetings in breweries or restaurants with an expert who introduces the topic and has a conversation with those present
- Social Networks: created to manage CICAP communication on social networks (mainly Facebook, Twitter, Instagram, Linkedin and Telegram)

== Events ==
=== Conventions ===
Since its foundation CICAP organizes, generally every two years, a national convention where internal and external speakers of the Committee meet to discuss a topic related to the paranormal or pseudosciences. The conventions are open to members and the public but require a participation fee to finance the group's activities.

==== National Conventions ====
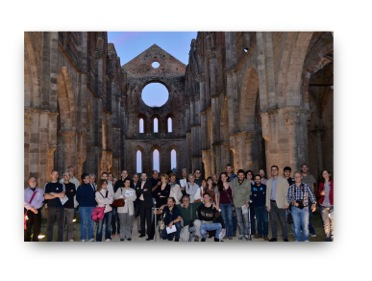
An excursion of CICAP members to the Abbey of San Galgano on the occasion of the XII National Convention in Volterra, 5–7 October 2012

- I National Convention, Scienza e paranormale, Padua, 1991
- II National Convention, IV congresso degli Euroskeptics, Paranormale: quali prove?, Saint-Vincent, 1992
- III National Convention, Contatti con l'aldilà, Cormons, 1993
- IV National Convention, Energie misteriose, Macerata, 1995
- V National Convention, New Age: Nuova Era o vecchie idee?, Padua, 1997
- VI National Convention, Scienza, paranormale e mass media, Padua, 1999
- VII National Convention, Medicine alternative: tra bisogni reali e irrazionalità, Reggio Emilia, 2001
- VIII National Convention, Il ritorno della magia, Turin, 2003
- IX National Convention, V World Skeptic Congress, Misteri risolti, Abano Terme, 2004
- X National Convention, Paranormale, Watson?, Padua, 2006
- XI National Convention, L'evoluzione del mystero, Abano Terme, 2009
- XII National Convention, 2012 – Si salvi chi può, Volterra, 2012
- XIII National Convention, L'arte del disinganno. 25 anni di avventure ai confini della scienza, Cesena, 2015
- XIV National Convention, Il valore dei fatti nell'era della post-verità, Cesena, 2017

==== Other conferences ====
- I International Conference on Metropolitan Legends, Contaminazioni, Turin, 2004
- Conference, Eppur si crede... Superstizioni e credenze alle soglie del XXI secolo, Padua, 2008
- Conference, I conti non tornano – Il fascino dei numeri tra scienza e mistero, Turin, 2011
- Conference, Il valore dei fatti, Milan, 2014

=== CICAP Fest ===
The XIV national conference in Cesena was also the trial edition of a new annual event, CICAP Fest, in which CICAP offers meetings, workshops and shows in line with the principles of the association. The conference is held altogether in Italian, but usually accommodates English-speaking speakers with simultaneous interpretation, to enable international participation in panels and talks. The general direction of the event is by Massimo Polidoro.

In 2018 the conference focused on magic. Speakers included James Randi, Susan Gerbic, Carlo Faggi, Max Vellucci, Gianfranco Preverino, Pino Rolle, Francesco Busani, Marco Aimone and Alex Rusconi as well as TV personalities. The 2018 CICAP Fest had over 200 events at ten locations.

=== Other events ===
Since 2009, CICAP has been organizing every year on Friday 17th (in Italy the number 17 is traditionally considered unlucky) an "Anti-Superstition Day", with the aim of making the general public reflect, on the absurdity of superstition. Usually, in various cities in Italy, CICAP local groups organize various types of events: meetings, conferences, debates and "practical" demonstrations.

CICAP takes part regularly, with information points and with the organization of scientific dissemination meetings, in events such as the Turin International Book Fair and Lucca Comics & Games.

== Investigations ==
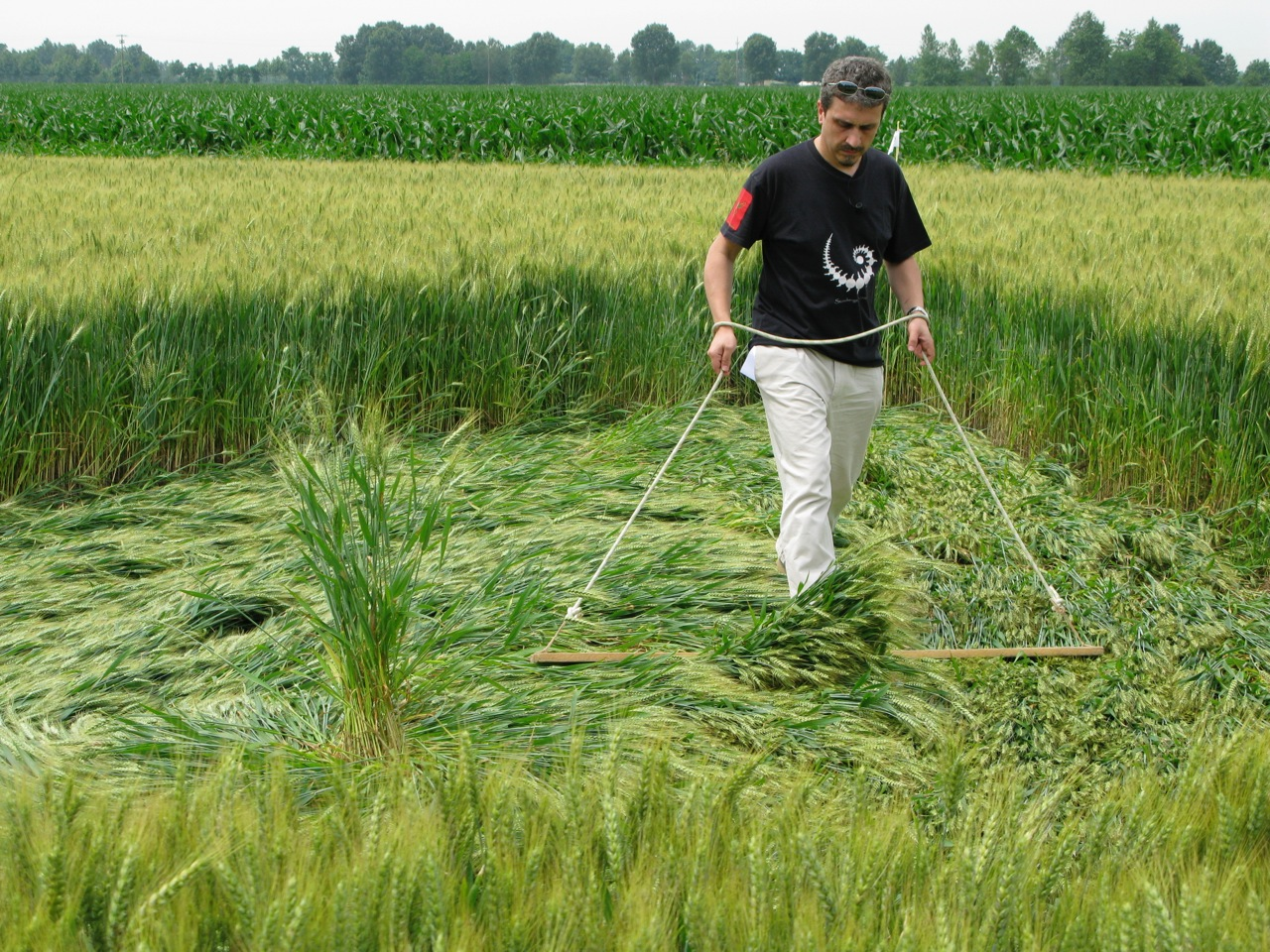
Francesco Grassi during a circle making session

The organization has investigated a number of paranormal phenomena including:

- The alleged San Gennaro blood miracle in Naples
- Russian psychic Nina Kulagina
- The alleged miracles of Padre Pio
- Italian crop circles

In September 2005, National Geographic Channel's program Is It Real? (episode 10) asked for a demonstration of "Knockout" Chi (a no-touch knockout technique), during which instructor Leon Jay was unable to knock out Luigi Garlaschelli, an investigator from CICAP.

== Publications ==
CICAP continues its dissemination activities through conferences and public lectures, radio and television appearances, the publication of Query a quarterly magazine (formerly Scienza & Paranormale, Science & Paranormal), books and articles regarding these topics, through the conservation of a library and an archive of articles. Additional material, both on CICAP's own research as well as foreigner skeptical and scientific papers translated into Italian, is published on QueryOnline, the online version of the printed magazine.

In 2020 CICAP launched on its YouTube channel "CICAP Live", a section of live video interviews with protagonists of science and culture with the aim of scrutinizing specific topics related to science and rationality.

The main publications are:

- Query, quarterly popular science magazine
- Query Online, an online magazine, with free access
- Magia, a six-monthly magazine dedicated to illusionism
- Quaderni del CICAP, monographic books of popular science
- Quaderni di Magia, monographic books on illusionism
- YouTube channel, which collects extracts from conferences and from the CICAP Fest, video sections

== Logo ==
CICAP's logo is based on the grid illusion. Designed in 1992 by Franco Ramaccini, was amended in 2009 and in 2013 with a more modern style.

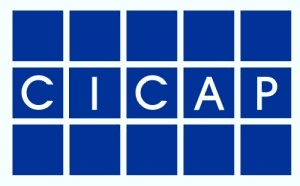
The logo used from 1992 to 2009

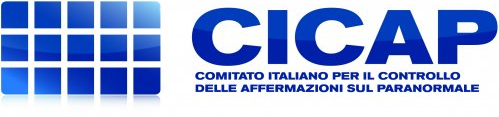
The logo used from 2009 to 2013

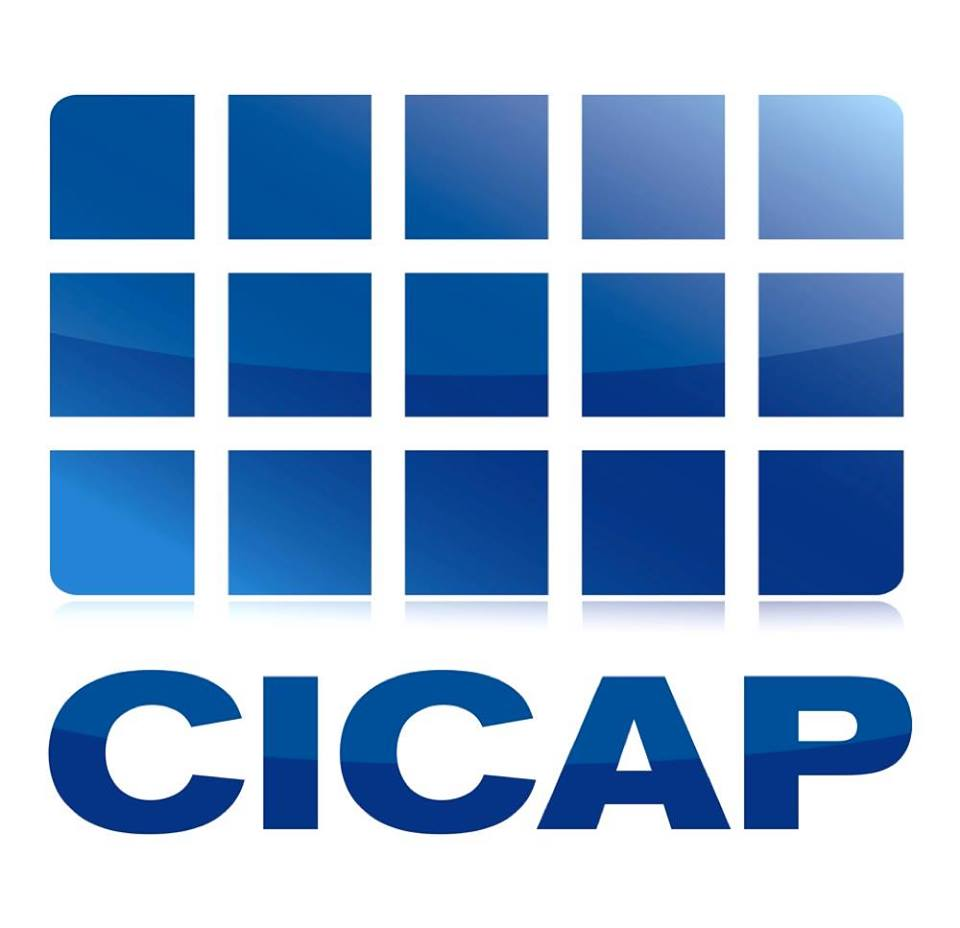
The logo used since 2013

== See also ==
- Piero Angela
- Committee for Skeptical Inquiry
