= Hisashi Sakaguchi =

Japanese manga artist and animator (1946–1995)

- 坂口尚
- Born: May 5, 1946; Tokyo, Japan
- Died: December 22, 1995 (aged 49); Tokyo, Japan
- Occupations: Manga artist and animator
- Years active: 1963–1995

Hisashi Sakaguchi (坂口尚, Sakaguchi Hisashi; May 5, 1946 – December 22, 1995) was a Japanese manga artist and animator. After working under Osamu Tezuka, he began focusing on creating his own manga, including the Ikkyū biography series Ikkyū, before dying at the age of 49.

== Life and work ==
At age seventeen, Sakaguchi dropped out of school to work for Osamu Tezuka's animation studio, Mushi Production. Serving as an assistant animator, he worked on the productions for Ambassador Atom, Kimba the White Lion, and Princess Knight. Sakaguchi also collaborated with Tezuka on the original manga Cleopatra, which was later adapted into the 1970 anime film of the same name. In 1969, he departed Tezuka's studio and began working independently, creating his own manga, including Version, the 1400-page Fleur de Pierre, and Ikkyū. He also illustrated the manga Wolf Guy for sci-fi writer Kazumasa Hirai.

Ikkyū (あっかんべェ一休; also known as Akanbe Ikkyū) is an imaginary biography of the titular 14th century monk, focusing on his struggles (including being the son of the Emperor of Japan) and his spiritual quest, leading him to become the wandering eccentric monk of legend. Before he could finish Ikkyū, Sakaguchi died from acute heart failure at the age of 49. Ikkyū was awarded the Japan Cartoonists Association Award posthumously.

In 2023, Sakaguchi's Ishi no Hana won the Prix du Patrimoine, which honors works that left their mark on history, at the 50th Angoulême International Comics Festival.

== See also ==
- Cleopatra
