= Cortex (journal) =

- Discipline: Psychology, neuroscience, cognitive science, neuropsychology, neurology
- Language: English
- Edited by: Robert McIntosh, D. Samuel Schwarzkopf

Publication details
- History: 1964–present
- Publisher: Elsevier
- Frequency: Monthly
- Open access: Hybrid
- Impact factor: 3.6 (2022)

Standard abbreviations
- ISO 4: Cortex

Indexing
- ISSN: 0010-9452
- LCCN: sn84006914
- OCLC no.: 784284125

Links
- Journal homepage; Online archive

Cortex is a monthly peer-reviewed scientific journal published by Elsevier. It covers studies on the psychology, neuroscience, cognitive science, neuropsychology, and neurology of the cerebral cortex. The journal was established in 1964 by Ennio De Renzi. Until recently, the co-editors-in-chief were Sergio Della Sala (University of Edinburgh and Jordan Grafman (Northwestern University). Since 2025, it has been edited by Editor-in-Chief Robert McIntosh (University of Edinburgh) and Deputy Editor D. Samuel Schwarzkopf (University of Auckland).

== Abstracting and indexing ==
The journal is abstracted and indexed in:

- Biological Abstracts
- BIOSIS Previews
- CINAHL
- Current Contents/Life Sciences
- Current Contents/Social and Behavioral Sciences
- Embase
- Index Medicus/MEDLINE/PubMed
- PASCAL
- ProQuest databases
- PsycINFO
- Science Citation Index Expanded
- Scopus
- Social Sciences Citation Index

According to the Journal Citation Reports, the journal has a 2022 impact factor of 3.6.
