= Emmanuil Enchmen =

Soviet behaviourist and biologist

Emmanuil Semenovich Enchmen (1891–1966) was a Soviet behaviourist and biologist. He formulated the "Theory of New Biology", often abbreviated TNB, which became popular among the Soviet student youth in the early 1920s. Considered politically, Enchmen's philosophy is an example of ″vulgar materialism″, a term often used by Marxist detractors. It was pejoratively called Enchmenism, especially when coupled and contrasted with the Mininism of Sergey Konstantinovich Minin and the Deborinism of Abram Deborin.

Emmanuil was born in 1891 in the Georgian town of Tbilisi into the family of a Jewish timekeeper employed by a construction company. From 1910, Enchmen studied at the St. Petersburg Psycho-Neurological Institute, receiving a degree in biology in 1914. In 1913 he met Ivan Pavlov. Leon Orbeli recalled that Pavlov told him in 1920 that Enchmen "was my best friend from the year 1913."

Enchman was drafted into the Russian Imperial Army in 1914, but following the February Revolution of 1917 he joined the Red Army, becoming a member of the Russian Communist Party in 1919, although previously he had been a Socialist Revolutionary. During the Russian Civil War, he applied his knowledge of English and German to agitate amongst foreign troops, and attained the rank of Senior Politruk. He became a protégé of Mikhail Tskhakaya, who sent him to Lenin with a personal letter of introduction. Despite being captured en route, he escaped and delivered the letter.

When Pavlov requested to be allowed to emigrate in September 1920, Lenin sent Enchman to see Pavlov. Enchman sent a report to Mikhail Pokrovsky outlining the inadequacy of Pavlov's working circumstances. This was forwarded to Lenin who issued a decree on February 11, 1921, which provided Pavlov with the material aid he needed.

In 1923, Nikolai Bukharin declared Enchmen's theory incompatible with what the Bolshevik regime regarded as Marxism, and Enchmen's reputation collapsed. It was only in 1990 that some of his material was republished in Russia. However, he had gained the attention of Gregory Razran, a Russian American psychologist who viewed Pavlovian psychology as being incompatible with Marxism-Leninism. In the years after, Enchmen held administrative positions but continued writing on issues related to Marxist philosophy. Following Buharin's fall from power and subsequent execution, Tskhakaya contacted Andrey Andreyevich Andreyev, a member of the politburo, to see if Enchman could recommence with his scientific interests, however, this was declined by Stalin.

Enchmen rejoined the Red Army with the rank of Senior Politruk, after the USSR was invaded by Germany. However, he was discharged in 1942 for health reasons. On January 16, 1943, he was given the position of a senior scientist at the Biological Section of the Academy of Sciences of the USSR, and on October 13, 1948, he was transferred to the Biophysical Section of the Pavlov Institute of Physiology.

== Theory of New Biology ==
=== Methodology ===
His Theory of New Biology was expressed in his unpublished 1913 text 'Psychology before the tribunal of reborn positivism' (Russian: Психология перед судом, возрождающегося позитивизма). This primarily dealt with methodology.

Firstly, Enchman makes a distinction between physical/material and psychological/conscious phenomena:

- The physical/material phenomena are objective, can be observed and have extension in space.
- The psychological/conscious phenomena are subjective, can only be experienced through introspection and have no extension in space.

The introspective person is aware of their own conscious experiences, but this cannot directly experience by any other person. However, a second observer can report on the overt activity, or behaviour, of the introspecting person. The scientific method is concerned with attempts to establish relationships among the observed phenomena of the physical/material realm, whilst ignoring any parallel psychological/conscious experiences. Thus, for Enchmen, the scientific study of living organisms requires a similar disregard of psychological/conscious phenomena which, he claimed, was similar to Pavlov's conditioning experiments in which behavior was studied without direct reference to subjective experiences.
