= Horror of the Wolf =

1973 Japanese horror film

- Theatrical release poster

Japanese name
- Kanji: 狼の紋章
Transcriptions
- Revised Hepburn: Ōkami no monshō
- Directed by: Masashi Matsumoto
- Screenplay by: Jun Fukuda; Shirō Ishimori; Masashi Matsumoto
- Starring: Taro Shigaki; Yōko Ichiji; Michiko Honda; Yūsaku Matsuda
- Production company: Toho
- Distributed by: Toho
- Release date: 1 September 1973 (Japan)
- Running time: 78 minutes
- Country: Japan
- Language: Japanese

Horror of the Wolf (Japanese: 狼の紋章, Hepburn: Ōkami no monshō; lit. 'Crest of the Wolf') is a 1973 Japanese horror film directed by Masashi Matsumoto and produced by Toho. Based on the manga series Wolf Guy, the film's screenplay was co-written by Matsumoto with Jun Fukuda and Shirō Ishimori. It stars Taro Shigaki as Akira Inugami, a young man who transforms into a werewolf by night. He develops a romance with a teacher while opposing a gang leader whose father, a member of the yakuza, murdered Akira's parents years before.

== Cast ==
- Taro Shigaki as Akira Inugami / Wolf Guy
- Yōko Ichiji as Akiko Aoshika (as Masako Aki)
- Michiko Honda as Noriko Kimura
- Yūsaku Matsuda as Dō Haguro
- Toshitaka Itō as Rikiya Kuroda
- Toshio Kurosawa as Akira Jin
- Sayoko Katō as Ryūko Konuma
- Masanobu Sawai as Ōka
- Masao Imanishi as Principal Ōnuki
- Kōichi Hayashi as Vice Principal Morizuka
