= Gregory Razran =

Expert on Russian psychological research

Gregory H. Razran (4 June 1901, in Slutsk – 31 August 1973, in St Petersburg, Florida) was a Russian American expert on Russian psychological research. He left Russia in 1920 and studied at Columbia University gaining a doctorate in 1933. He moved to Queens College, City University of New York in 1940 where he became a professor and headed the Psychology department there from 1945 to 1966. He received a Guggenheim Fellowship in 1948.

Razran regarded the work of Ivan Pavlov as a "Trojan horse" in the Soviet Union, incompatible with Marxism-Leninism. In 1950, he published a short piece about the Soviet behaviourist, Emmanuil Enchmen, a loyal Stalinist whose scientific views had been proscribed since 1923.

In 1964 Razran was prominently featured in an article on Dermo-optical perception, a discredited phenomenon which has not been demonstrated scientifically. This reviewed the research of Abram S. Novomeysky into the abilities of Rosa Kuleshova. Razran declared that "there is no longer any doubt in his mind that this work was valid." In fact Razran was quite excited about the research: "In all my years, I can't remember when anything has had me more excited than this prospect of opening up new doors of perception." Complaining that he was too excited to sleep at night, he opined that this was a "major scientific breakthrough" which would lead to an "explosive outburst of research" whose results were "bound to be revolutionary". Razran was keen to return to Queens College, City University of New York, where he was a professor and planned to carry out further research in this area himself.

He moved to St Petersburg, Florida where he was professor at Eckerd College. He drowned while swimming at the age of 72.
