= Nina Kulagina =

Russian woman allegedly with psychic powers (1926–1990)

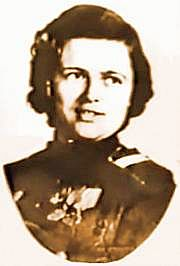
- Born: Ninel Mikhaylova; 10 July 1926; Leningrad, Russian SFSR, Soviet Union
- Died: 11 April 1990 (aged 63)
- Known for: Reported psychic ability

Nina Kulagina, Ninel Sergeyevna Kulagina (Russian: Нине́ль Серге́евна Кула́гина, born Ninel Mikhaylova) (30 July 1926 – 11 April 1990) was a Russian woman who claimed to have psychic powers, particularly in psychokinesis. Academic research of her phenomenon was conducted in the USSR for the last 20 years of her life.

Kulagina was suspected of utilizing hidden magnets and threads to perform her feats. She was caught cheating on more than one occasion according to the authors of several books and publications. In 1987, Kulagina sued and won a partial victory in a defamation case brought against a Soviet government magazine that had accused her of fraud.

== Biography ==
Kulagina, who was born in 1926, joined the Red Army at age fourteen, entering its tank regiment during World War II, but she was a housewife at the time that her alleged psychic abilities were studied and she entered international discourse in the 1960s. During the Cold War, silent black-and-white films were produced, in which she appeared to move objects on a table in front of her without touching them. These films were allegedly made under controlled conditions for Soviet authorities and caused excitement for many psychic researchers around the world, some of whom believed that they represented clear evidence for the existence of psychic phenomena. According to reports from the Soviet Union, 40 scientists, two of whom were Nobel Prize laureates, studied Kulagina. In Investigating Psychics, Larry Kettlekamp claims that Kulagina was filmed separating broken eggs that had been submerged in water, moving apart the whites and yolks, during which event such physical changes were recorded as accelerated and altered: heartbeat, brain waves and electromagnetic field. To ensure that external electromagnetic impulses did not interfere, she was placed inside a metal cage while she supposedly demonstrated an ability to remove a marked matchstick from a pile of matchsticks under a glass dome.

Kulagina claimed that she first recognized her ability, which she believed she had inherited from her mother, when she realized that items spontaneously moved around her when she was angry. Kulagina said that in order to manifest the effect, she required a period of meditation to clear her mind of all thoughts. When she had obtained the focus required, she reported a sharp pain in her spine and the blurring of her eyesight. Reportedly, storms interfered with her ability to perform psychokinetic acts.

One of Kulagina's most celebrated experiments took place in a Leningrad laboratory on 10 March 1970. Having initially studied the ability to move inanimate objects, scientists were curious to see if Kulagina's abilities extended to cells, tissues, and organs. Sergeyev was one of many scientists present when Kulagina attempted to use her energy to stop the beating of a frog's heart floating in solution. He said that she focused intently on the heart and apparently made it beat faster, then slower, and using extreme intent of thought, stopped it.

== Dispute ==
Many individuals and organizations, such as the James Randi Educational Foundation and the Italian Committee for the Investigation of Claims on the Paranormal (CICAP) express skepticism regarding claims of psychokinesis. Massimo Polidoro has written that the long preparation times and uncontrolled environments (such as hotel rooms) in which the experiments with Kulagina took place left much potential for trickery. Magicians and skeptics have argued that Kulagina's feats could easily be performed by one experienced in sleight of hand, through means such as cleverly concealed or disguised threads, small pieces of magnetic metal, or mirrors; in addition, the Cold War-era Soviet Union had an obvious motive for falsifying or exaggerating results in the potential propaganda value in appearing to win a "Psi Race" analogous to the concurrent Space Race or arms race.

In the 1960s, Russian journalist Vladimir Lvov published an article in Pravda which accused Kulagina of fraud. Lvov wrote that she performed one of her tricks by concealing a magnet on her body. The article also reported that Kulagina had been arrested for cheating the public out of five thousand rubles. Science writer Martin Gardner described Kulagina as a "pretty, plump, dark eyed little charlatan" who had been caught using tricks to move objects. According to Gardner, she was "caught cheating more than once by Soviet Establishment scientists."

In 1986, the magazine Man and Law published by the Soviet Ministry of Justice accused Kulagina of fraud. Kulagina sued the magazine journalists for defamation and won a partial victory on the suit a year later. The court ruled that the journalists did not have direct evidence of fraud. Kulagina was not present at the trial. The Russian Skeptic Society have noted that the trial's conclusion "does not say anything about whether Kulagina has been confirmed to have anomalous abilities".

== See also ==
- Stanisława Tomczyk
