= Joaquín Argamasilla =

Spanish nobleman

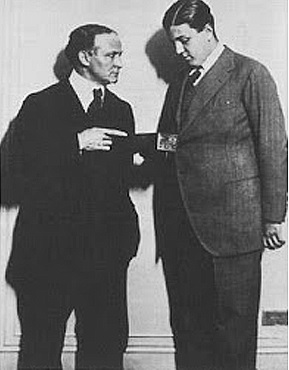
- Argamasilla (right) with Harry Houdini in 1924
- Born: Joaquín María Argamasilla de la Cerda y Elío; 4 April 1905; Madrid, Spain
- Died: 27 May 1987 (aged 82); Bilbao, Spain

Joaquín María Argamasilla de la Cerda y Elío (4 April 1905 – 27 May 1987) was a Spanish noble who was the 11th Marquess de Santacara, but he is better known for claiming in the early 1920s a supposed ability to see through opaque objects. Argamasilla convinced important people of the era such as Gustav Geley and Charles Richet of his powers, but he was exposed by Harry Houdini as a fraud in 1924.

== Biography ==
Joaquín Argamasilla was encouraged in his parapsychology career by his father, the Marquis de Santa Cara, who was convinced that his son had psychic powers. Argamasilla was promoted as having X-ray vision that could penetrate metal. For example, he was seemingly able to read the time on a watch through a case. Among the audience of these shows was the Spanish writer Valle-Inclan, who was a friend of the father of the psychic and became convinced that Joaquín's powers were real.

Argamasilla's fame led him in 1924 to the Pennsylvania Hotel in New York City. There he met magician Harry Houdini, who became convinced that he was a fraud who just peeked through his simple blindfold and lifted up the edge of the box so he could look inside it without others noticing. Argamasilla could not replicate his abilities when forced to do the same with a box not owned by him. Houdini regarded Argamasilla to be "a very clever manipulator" who "acts his part in such as manner as to insure misdirection".

Argamasilla never did another psychic demonstration. He later was assigned the position of general director of Film and Theatre (1952-1955).

Argamasilla died on 27 May 1987 in Bilbao, Spain at the age of 82.

== In fiction ==
A fictional version of Argamasilla (in which his powers turn out to be real) appears in the 14th episode of the Spanish science-fiction series El Ministerio del Tiempo.
