= Kazumasa Hirai (author) =

Japanese writer

- Born: May 13, 1938
- Died: January 17, 2015 (aged 76)
- Writing career
- Genre: Science fiction
- Notable works: 8 Man, Genma Wars, Wolf Guy
- Website: wolfguy.com

Kazumasa Hirai (平井 和正, Hirai Kazumasa; May 13, 1938 – January 17, 2015) was a Japanese novelist and science fiction writer from Yokosuka, Kanagawa. He graduated from Yokosuka Industrial High School and the law department of Chuo University. Hirai is well known for his SF-manga work. He is the creator of 8 Man (aka 8th Man in the USA) and was well known as the story creator of the 1960s manga series "Genma Taisen" (Genma Wars) about a hero with psychokinetic powers and his battle against a space villain called Genma. Hirai wrote stories for the Wolf Guy comic series, and also published comics co-authored with cartoonist Shotaro Ishinomori that were later adapted into an animated film in 1983.

== Works available in English translation ==
Novel

- Wolfcrest 1, translated by Edward Lipsett. Tokyo: Kodansha English Library. 1985. ISBN 4061860135. (The anterior half of Ookami no Monshō)
- Wolfcrest 2, translated by Edward Lipsett. Tokyo: Kodansha English Library. 1985. ISBN 4061860143. (The latter half of Ookami no Monshō)

Short story

- "A Time for Revolution," translated by David Aylward. Speculative Japan: Outstanding Tales of Japanese Science Fiction and Fantasy, Tokyo: Kurodahan Press. 2007. ISBN 4902075261 (original title: Kakumei no Toki)

== Works ==
=== Novels ===
- Megalopolis no Tora (1968)
- Android Oyuki (1969)
- Wolf Guy Series [ウルフガイ・シリーズ]

- Adult Wolf Guy Series [11 volumes]

1. Ookamiotoko da yo (He's a Werewolf!, 1969)
2. Ookami yo, kokyou wo mi yo (1973)
3. Rio no Ookamiotoko (1973)
4. Jinrou Jigoku (Wolf Guy Inferno, 1974)
5. Jinrou Sensen (Wolf Guy Front, 1974)
6. Ookami wa nakazu (1974)
7. Jinrou Hakusho (Wolf Guy Report, 1976)
8. Jinrou Tenshi {3volumes} (Wolf Angel, 1978–1980)
9. Wakaki Ookami no Shouzou (Portrait of a Young Wolf, 1979)

- Wolf Guy Series [19 volumes]

1. Ookami no Monshō (Wolfcrest, 1971)
2. Ookami no Enka (1972)
3. Ookami no Requiem {2volumes} (1975)
4. Ougon no Shoujo {5volumes} (Golden Girl, 1985–1994)
5. Inugami Akira {10volumes} (1994–1995)

- Gekkou Majutsudan Series [30 volumes]

1. Gekkou Majutsudan {12volumes} (Moonlight Magic, 1996–1998)
2. Wolf Guy DNA {12volumes} (1999–2000)
3. Genma Taisen DNA {6volumes} (Genma Wars DNA, 2002)

- Wolf Guy Extra Volumes

1. Wolfrando ~ Ookami no Sekai (Wolfland ~ The World of the Wolf, 1976)
2. Megami Henshou (1988)

- Cyborg Blues (1971)
- Zombie Hunter [死霊狩り(ゾンビー・ハンター)]

- Zombie Hunter (1972)
- Zombie Hunter 2 (1976)
- Zombie Hunter 3 (1978)

- Akuryō no Joō (1976)
- Genma Wars Séries [幻魔大戦シリーズ]

- New Genma Wars (1978)
- Real Genma Wars (1980-1985)
- Genma Wars (1979-1983)
- Armageddon (1987)
- Armageddon Girl（The Girl in Harmagedon (closet screenplay) ハルマゲドンの少女） (1986)
- Genma Wars deep (2005)
- Genma Wars deep Toltec (2008)

- Chikyuuju no Megami [地球樹の女神]

- Chikyuuju no Megami (1988-1992)
- Crystal Child (1997)
- Sono hi no gogo, Hôdaiyama de (2004)

- Bohemian Glass Street {9volumes} (1995)
- 21st Century 8 Man

- Infinity Blue (2002)
- Blue Series

1. Blue Highways (2002)
2. Blue Lady (2005)

- Abduction Series

- Jikuu bôsô kimagure Bus (2001)
- Wayward Bus (2003)
- Stray Sheep (2003)
- Abduction (2003)
- Silence (2003)
- Shade (2003)
- Capricious (2003)

=== Manga ===
- 8 Man (artist: Jiro Kuwata)
- Elite (artist: Jiro Kuwata)
- Chou ken Leap (artist: Jiro Kuwata)
- Genma Taisen (artist: Shotaro Ishinomori)
- Death Hunter (artist: Jiro Kuwata)
- Wolf Guy (artist: Hisashi Sakaguchi)
- Spider-Man: The Manga (artist: Ryoichi Ikegami)
- Shin Genma Taisen (artist: Shotaro Ishinomori)
- Crystal Child (artist: Ayumi Izumitani)
- Bachigami (artist: Yuuki Yogo)
- 8 Man Infinity (8 Man sequel: Kyôichi Nanatsuki, artist: Takayuki Takashi)
- Genma Taisen Rebirth (Kyôichi Nanatsuki, artist: Masato Hayase, Ishimori Productions)
- 8 Man vs Cyborg 009 (Kyôichi Nanatsuki, artist: Masato Hayase, Ishimori Productions)
