= Melbourne Custody Centre =

Police station in Melbourne, Australia

Coordinates: 37°48′48″S 144°57′23″E

General information
- Location: 520 Lonsdale St, Melbourne VIC 3000, Australia

Website
- https://www.police.vic.gov.au

The Melbourne Custody Centre is the main reception facility in Melbourne, Australia for people who have been arrested by police. The centre is located underneath the Melbourne Magistrates' Court and utilised during the day to hold prisoners who will be attending hearings at the Magistrates, County or Supreme Courts. When the majority of the prisoners who are there during the day have been transported back to their respective facilities, the Victoria Police will, during the evening and night, hold people at the Custody centre when they have been arrested for being "Drunk in a Public Place".

The facility has been operated by G4S since March 2010.

== G4S Take Over ==
In March 2010, G4S assumed responsibility for the day-to-day running of The Melbourne Custody Centre. Previously GEO Group had been running the facility but were not considered for the re-tender after a number of incidents that occurred while they were responsible for the unit. G4S assumed responsibility for the Melbourne Custody Centre (MCC) on 28 March 2010 on behalf of Victoria Police. The MCC, which is located under the Melbourne Magistrates' Court, is initially the central location for all prisoners arrested by Victoria Police. It also receives and accommodates prisoners attending the Melbourne Magistrates Court. Prisoners can be accommodated at the MCC for up to 14 days and the majority are then either transferred to the Melbourne Assessment Prison in the case of males, or the Dame Phyllis Frost Centre for females. The MCC can accommodate a maximum of 67 prisoners and there are approximately 22,000 prisoner movements annually.

Victoria Police is responsible for Health Care in the Centre and provides a medical service 24 hours a day, seven days a week. Prisoners may receive both social and professional visits, and the Salvation Army provides welfare and spiritual support and is on site daily.

== Incidents while under GEO Group Inc Management ==
An Ombudsman's report tabled in Parliament in 2007 found that staff at the centre had inadequate training to deal with difficult prisoners and unsatisfactory systems for monitoring incidents. It found there was a culture of excessive force being used by staff. In one such incident in June 2007, a prisoner was seriously mistreated when force was used during a strip search. The Deputy Ombudsman, John Taylor, says the incident is indicative of a wider problem. "We are concerned that there is a culture in the custody centre that tolerates unnecessary force," he said. The Ombudsman has called for better training and oversight of staff by the company contracted to run the facility and by Victoria Police. The Ombudsman also wants prisoners to have better access to telephones so they can contact their lawyers. But Victoria Police's Ashley Dickinson says the incident is not being investigated and he is satisfied with the way the centre is being run. "We monitor the management of the custody centre very closely and we would say that we are happy with the management," he said. It is the second time in eighteen months that the Ombudsman has been critical of the way people are treated in police custody.

Closed circuit TV footage of a prisoner being wrestled to the ground and assaulted has exposed a culture of brute force at the Melbourne Custody Centre, the ombudsman has found. Victorian Ombudsman George Brouwer has called for a review of MCC procedures after finding staff subjected the man to excessive force and "serious mistreatment". The prisoner, identified as Mr A, was left bloodied with a cut to his head after being pinned to the ground and hit during a strip search on June 13, the ombudsman's report said.

== Mr A's Experience at MCC ==
Closed circuit TV footage of a prisoner being wrestled to the ground and assaulted has exposed a culture of brute force at the Melbourne Custody Centre, the ombudsman has found. Victorian Ombudsman George Brouwer has called for a review of MCC procedures after finding staff subjected the man to excessive force and "serious mistreatment".

According to the ombudsman's report, the prisoner, identified as Mr A, was left bloodied with a cut to his head after being pinned to the ground and hit during a strip search on June 13. The report was tabled in the Victorian parliament in 2007. It highlighted systematic breaches of procedures and insufficient training and supervision at the MCC.

The centre is under the Melbourne Magistrates Court and houses prisoners on remand pending court appearances and prisoner transfers.

Mr Brouwer said witnesses spoke of a clique of prison officers at the MCC, known as `the family', who dominated the work force. There was a culture of staff favouritism, tolerance of prisoner abuse and fear that those who spoke out would lose their jobs. One witness said officers thrived on aggression: "You've got people there that are wanting to punch on...There's staff members that want to get at the prisoner that's on the floor simply because the prisoner wouldn't listen in the first instance."

Mr Brouwer said it was clear in Mr A's case that officers overreacted and violated his human rights. "I am of the opinion that MCC officers have resorted to the use of force as a first response to situations where verbal techniques ... would have been more appropriate," he said. "The use of force must be a last resort."

Mr A was on remand after being arrested at his home during a search warrant. CCTV footage shows one custody officer, identified as Officer X, lunging at the prisoner's throat as he complains about being strip searched. He ends up pinned to the floor by four officers, including Officer X's girlfriend, Officer Z, who struck him in the head. "While I'm on the ground she smacked my head into the ground and blood started coming out," Mr A said in the report.

Victoria Police is investigating the assault and the two officers will undergo disciplinary action. The contractor who operates the centre, GEO Group Australia, issued a statement saying they disagreed with key aspects of the report and had a zero tolerance policy on prisoner mistreatment. Mr Brouwer recommended a review of operations at the MCC, installation of a telephone system so prisoners could contact their lawyers and greater monitoring by Victoria Police. He also expressed dismay that the MCC was being used as a "de facto prison", with inmates often held for up to 28 days, despite his protests last year that stays be limited to one or two days. The Law Institute of Victoria and the Opposition agreed. "It's not designed to be a long term prison ... it's designed only for short term holding," Opposition police spokesman Andrew McIntosh said.
