= Ikkyū (manga) =

Japanese manga series

- First tankōbon volume cover, featuring a young Ikkyū

あっかんべェ一休 (Akkanbe Ikkyū)
- Genre: Historical
- Manga
- Written by: Hisashi Sakaguchi
- Published by: Kodansha
- Imprint: Afternoon KC Deluxe
- Magazine: Monthly Afternoon
- Original run: May 25, 1993 – November 25, 1995
- Volumes: 4
- icon

Ikkyū (Japanese: あっかんべェ一休, Hepburn: Akkanbe Ikkyū; lit. 'Taunting Ikkyū') is a Japanese manga series written and illustrated by Hisashi Sakaguchi, based on the life of the 14th century Zen monk Ikkyū. It was serialized in Kodansha's seinen manga magazine Monthly Afternoon from May 1993 to November 1995, left unfinished when Sakaguchi died from acute heart failure at the age of 49. The manga posthumously received the Japan Cartoonists Association Award in 1996.

Set during the tumultuous Muromachi period, the manga focuses on Ikkyū's spiritual struggles and transformation into an unorthodox, wandering monk. The story combines and truncates many of the facts and fictions of Ikkyū's life and draws influence from Noh theatre.

== Plot ==
The story is set during the tumultuous Muromachi period. Illegitimately-born son of Emperor Go-Komatsu, Ikkyū, is given to the Ankokuji Temple in Kyoto for his own safety. Ardent in his studies of Zen, Ikkyu is a clever boy who becomes tired of the hypocrisy surrounding him at the Ankokuji. Wandering the cities and back-country of Japan, Ikkyu develops a legendary reputation as both an ascetic and libertine monk.

== Publication ==
Written and illustrated by Hisashi Sakaguchi, Ikkyū was serialized in Kodansha's seinen manga magazine Monthly Afternoon from May 25, 1993, (Note: Debuted in the magazine's July 1993 issue, released on May 25, 1993.) to November 25, 1995, (Note: Published in the magazine's January 1996 issue, released on November 25, 1995.) until his death from acute heart failure at the age of 49 in December 1995. Kodansha collected its chapters in four tankōbon volumes, released from December 18, 1993, to January 23, 1996. The volumes were later republished in two bunkobon volumes, with both volumes released on October 12, 1998.

=== Volumes ===
No.	Release date	ISBN
1	December 18, 1993	978-4-06-319442-5
2	June 23, 1994	978-4-06-319490-6
3	April 21, 1995	978-4-06-319587-3
4	January 23, 1996	978-4-06-319666-5

== Reception ==
The manga posthumously won the Excellence Award at the 1996 Japan Cartoonists Association Award.
