= Ikkyū-san =

Ikkyū-san may refer to:

- Ikkyū-san (TV series), a historical anime series produced by Toei Animation
- Ikkyū-san (manga), a baseball manga written and illustrated by Shinji Mizushima
