= Drunk walking =

Intoxicated behavior

Drunk walking describes people intoxicated by alcohol walking in public spaces. While there are long-standing social stigmas and laws against drunk driving, only more recently have the personal and social dangers of drunk walking become apparent. One study on pedestrians struck by vehicles found that alcohol users were twice as likely to cross against the signal or outside of a crosswalk than sober pedestrians. Alcohol use was also associated with more severe injuries and longer hospital stays (3.89 days vs. 1.82 days).

== Statistics ==
=== US ===
US department of transportation data from 2009 reported that 4,092 pedestrians were killed and 13.6% of them were under the influence of alcohol, drugs or medication. Pedestrian injury accounts for 11% of all road user fatalities. In the United States in 2006 there were 4,784 fatalities and 61,000 injuries from pedestrian injury. In 2007 there were 4,654 fatalities and 70,000 injuries.

=== Canada ===
In Canada, injury is the prominent source of death for those under 45 years of age and the fourth most collective reason of death for all ages. Traumatic pedestrian injury results in nearly 4,000 hospitalisations in Canada yearly. The outcome of these injuries come from the interaction of environmental factors changing.

=== Australia ===
In 2011, the Pedestrian Council of Australia launched a campaign called "Never Let a Mate Walk Home Drunk", in an effort to curb the high number of pedestrians killed on Australian roads. 20% of pedestrians killed on Australian roads have a BAC exceeding 0.05%, and 30% of those killed or seriously injured have a BAC over 0.08%.

Between 2003–2006 in Adelaide there were 40 pedestrian fatalities, and of those 12 were found to be drunk. In three or four of these cases it was found that they were either lying or sitting on the ground at night. In Australia, men are the biggest culprits with a study done between 1998–2002 with 38% of fatal incidents to pedestrians happening to males ages 15–54, and out of those 78% were over the legal limit to drive.

== Legality ==
=== Spain ===
In 2015 Spanish authorities proposed rules allowing police officers to issue breathalyzer tests to pedestrians involved in accidents. As of 2023, pedestrians who refuse to be tested for alcohol can be fined up to €1,000.

=== United States ===
==== Iowa ====
Being drunk or pretending to be drunk in a public place is a misdemeanor in the state of Iowa.

== See also ==
- Alcohol intoxication
- Public intoxication
