= Massimo Polidoro =

Italian psychologist and writer (born 1969)

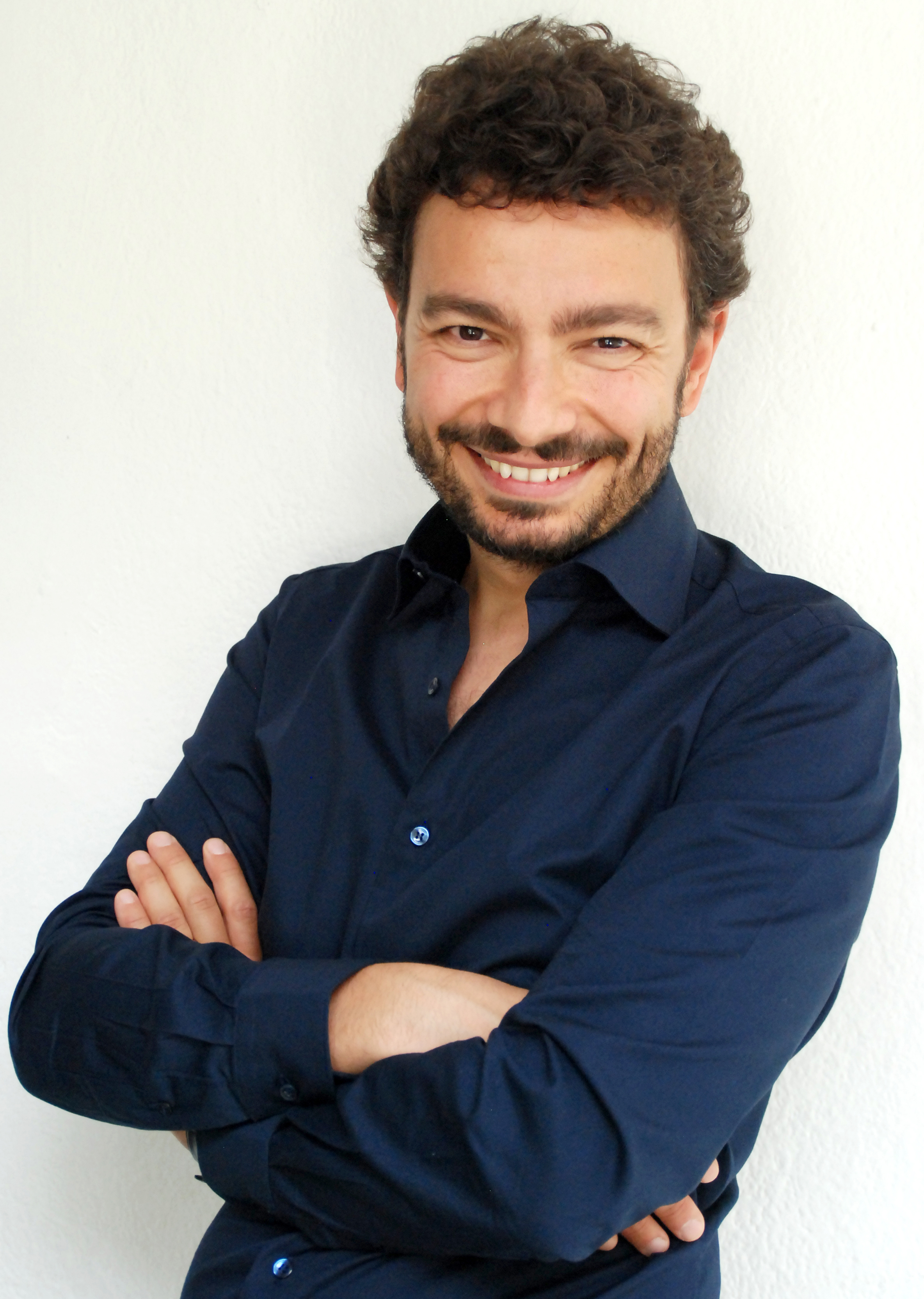
- Born: 10 March 1969 (age 57); Voghera, Italy
- Occupations: Psychologist; Writer; Journalist
- Known for: co-founder and executive director of CICAP
- Height: 1.78 m (5 ft 10 in)
- Website: massimopolidoro.com

Massimo Polidoro (born 10 March 1969) is an Italian psychologist, writer, journalist, television personality, and co-founder and executive director of the Italian Committee for the Investigation of Claims of the Pseudosciences (CICAP).

== Early life ==
As a child in the 1970s, Polidoro was fascinated by magic and the claims surrounding psychic phenomena. He read many books on these arguments that left him with numerous unanswered questions until he came upon Viaggio nel mondo del paranormale (Journey into the world of the paranormal) by Piero Angela. In the book, Angela treated these topics from a scientific angle instead of assuming they were true phenomena. He learned in his teens about the work of James Randi, and CSICOP investigating parapsychology from a critical, skeptical point of view. Polidoro studied Randi and his publications. Randi, like Houdini, was a magician and investigator of mysteries who employed a scientific approach to his investigations.

Polidoro corresponded with Randi and Angela by mail, where they planned a skeptical organization in Italy based on CSICOP's work in the United States. He was invited to meet both Angela and Randi and again later to a meeting in Rome as Angela's guest in 1988.

After Randi and Angela spent three days with Polidoro in Rome, it was agreed that he would become an apprentice to Randi, learning how to investigate mysteries. With a grant from Angela, Polidoro left for the United States and became Randi's only full-time apprentice in the art of paranormal investigation and psychic testing.

After several years during which he helped Randi in his investigations, research, writings and lectures, Polidoro returned to Italy in 1990, where he co-founded CICAP with Piero Angela, and Lorenzo Montali. He studied psychology, and graduated from the University of Padua with a master thesis on the psychology of eyewitness testimony of anomalous phenomena.

== CICAP and CSI ==
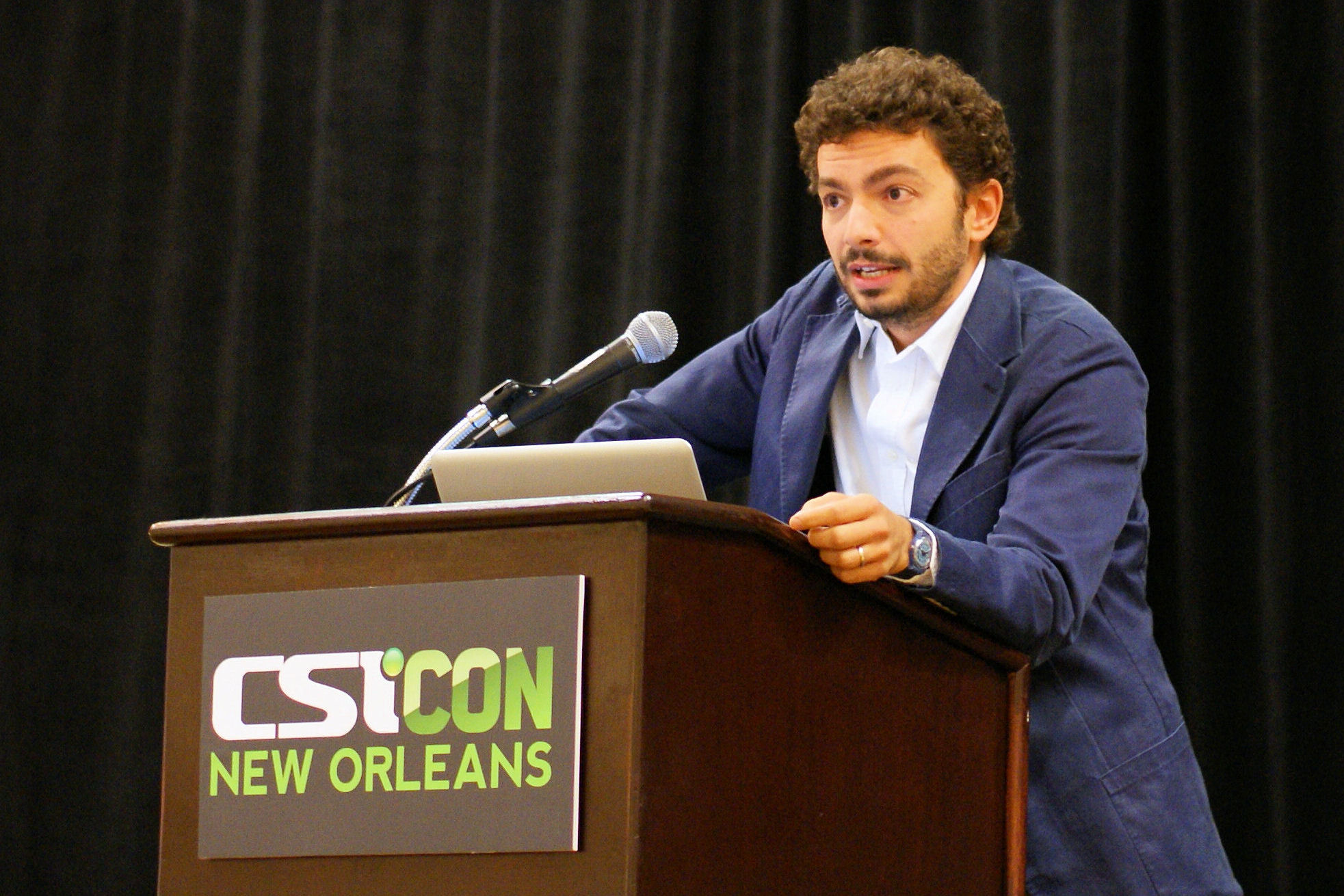
Massimo Polidoro participating in "The Investigators" panel at CSICon 2011 in New Orleans.

Polidoro is the executive director of CICAP, and was the editor of its journal, Scienza & Paranormale, from its debut in 1993 to 2006. In 1996 he became the European representative for the James Randi Educational Foundation. In 2001, he became a member of the European Council of Skeptical Organisations (ECSO), and was nominated as a research fellow of CSICOP, the Committee for the Investigation of Claims of the Paranormal (now Committee for Skeptical Inquiry). When Martin Gardner left his regular column "Notes from a Fringe Watcher" in The Skeptical Inquirer, the magazine of CSICOP, Polidoro was asked to take over, and the column was retitled "Notes on a Strange World".

Polidoro continues to investigate and test alleged psychics, astrologers, clairvoyants, dowsers, mediums, prophets, psychic detectives, psychic healers, psychic photographers, telepaths and many others. He has conducted historical investigations on famous cases and personalities of the past, including Eusapia Palladino, Margery and his childhood hero Houdini. Some of this work is collected in his books, two of which, Final Séance and Secrets of the Psychics, have been published by Prometheus Books.

In 2004, Polidoro's passion for magic led him to start the magazine Magia, devoted to the study of the history, science and psychology of conjuring.

In 2005 he became the first Italian to hold a course on "Scientific Method, Pseudoscience and Anomalistic psychology", as a member of the psychology faculty of the University of Milan Bicocca.

In 2017, Polidoro organized CICAP Fest, a festival of science and curiosity held annually in Padua and co-organized with the city and the University of Padua. CICAP Fest is a series of events: talks and meetings with authors, scientists and intellectuals; workshops and spaces to engage the public with stimulating and fun activities. The third edition of the festival, CICAP Fest Extra held in 2020, was entirely an online event, due to the COVID-19 pandemic.

Since 2018, Polidoro teaches a postgraduate course on science communication at the University of Padua.

== In print ==
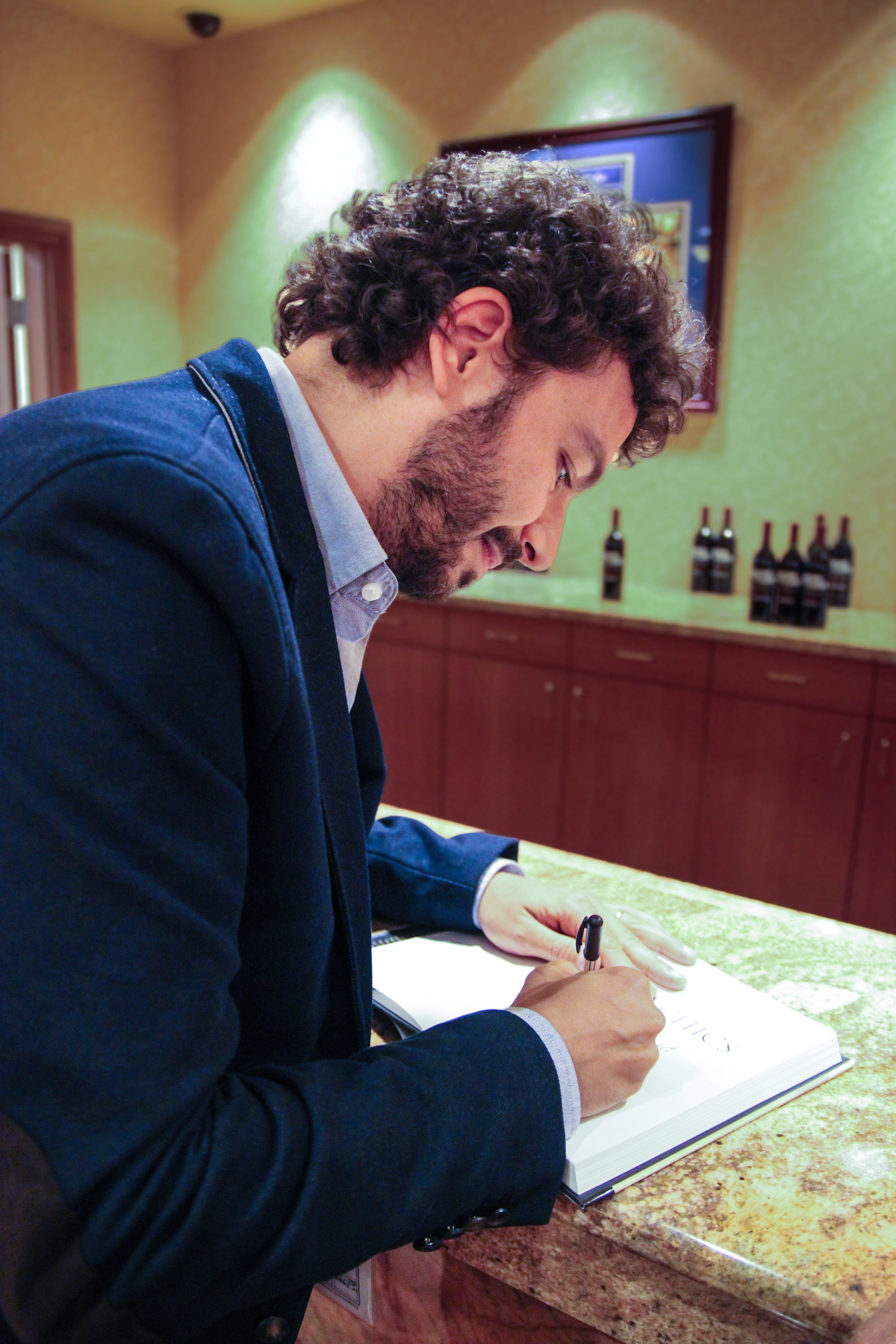
Polidoro at book signing TAM 2013

As a journalist, Polidoro is a contributor to the monthly Italian magazine Focus. He is the author of over 50 books in Italian, some of which have been translated into other languages. These cover a variety of subjects related to mysteries, the paranormal, historical enigmas, the history of Spiritualism, a dictionary of Parapsychology, the RMS Titanic, a biography of Houdini, famous unsolved crimes of the past, and legends related to the mysterious deaths of celebrities. In 2006 he published his first novel, Il profeta del Reich (The Prophet of the Reich), a thriller loosely inspired by the life of magician Erik Jan Hanussen.

In mid-2007, the Italian newspaper La Repubblica, one of the larger daily general-interest newspapers in circulation in Italy, reprinted six of Polidoro's books in a series that was sold at newsstands, along with the many local issues of the newspaper.

Final Séance (2001) deals with the strange friendship between Houdini and Sir Arthur Conan Doyle, chronicling their friendly early exchanges through to their later quarrels over their opposing views of Spiritualism.

Secrets of the Psychics (2003) is a collection of investigations carried out by Polidoro on psychic phenomena, including tests of psychics, poltergeists, miracles and other strange phenomena. Both books are published by Prometheus Books, and have been translated into several languages.

The publication of Polidoro's fiftieth book, Leonardo. Il romanzo di un genio ribelle (Leonardo: The Story of a Rebel Genius), coincides with the 500th anniversary (in 2019) of Leonardo da Vinci's death. Along with the book, Polidoro celebrated da Vinci's legacy with a new YouTube video series. He also undertook a touring theatrical performance mixing narrative, science, and art to highlight the man who was Leonardo, exploring how da Vinci came to be regarded as history's best-known polymath despite personal difficulties, societal resistance, and the limits of his own humanity.

== The James Randi Biography Project ==
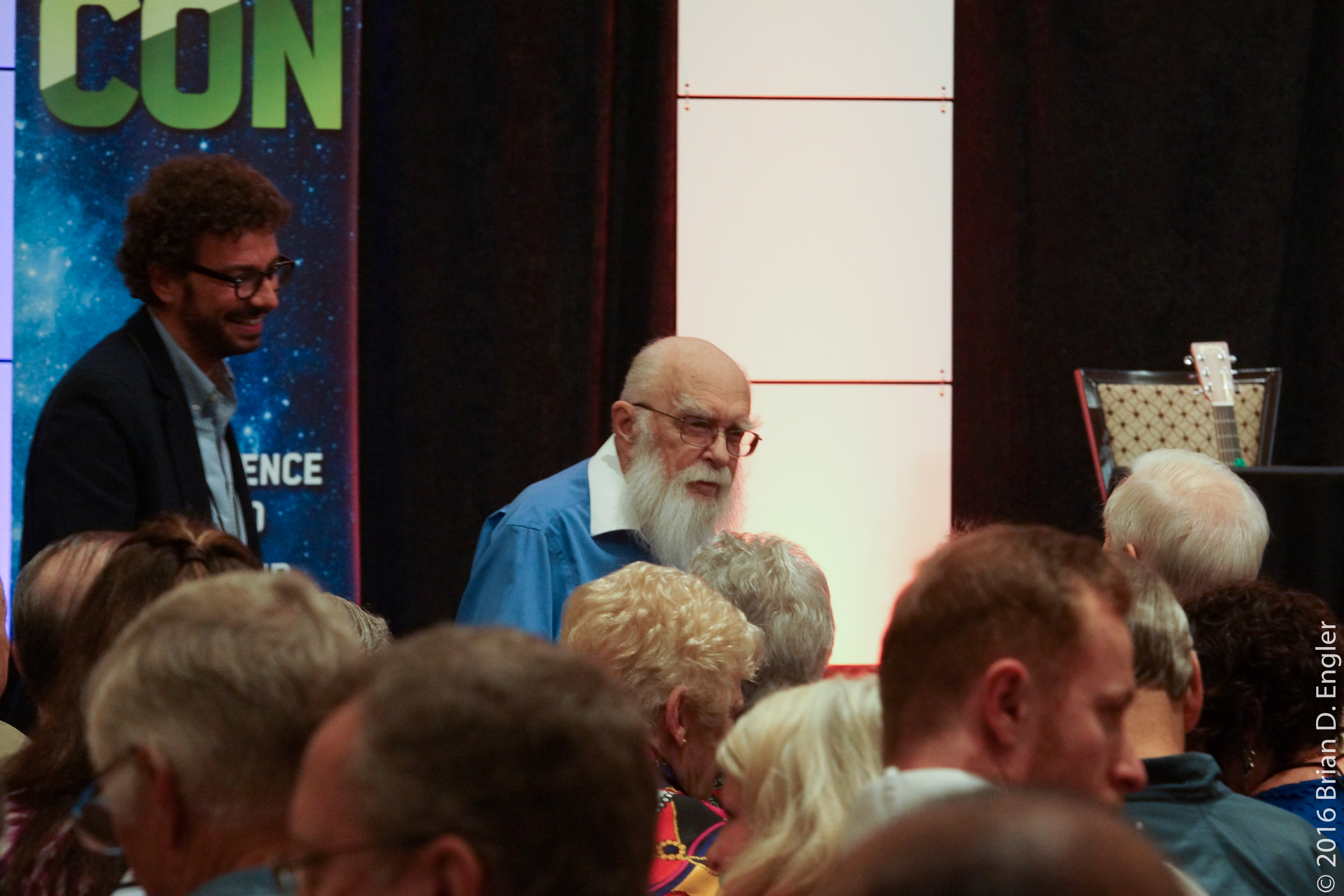
James Randi & Massimo Polidoro at CSICon 2016

At The Amaz!ng Meeting 2014 Polidoro announced that work on the biography of the life of James Randi was underway.

The need for the biography was Penn Jillette’s brainchild, and in 2005 Jillette began interviewing Randi for this reason. Kim Scheinberg helped Jillette with his research for the book which included the search for stories, documents, and clippings. This resulted in the collection of hundreds of hours of interviews and a large amount of material covering 60 years.

Polidoro announced that he had begun work on the biography, and had reviewed the material gathered by Jillette and Scheinberg, along with source material used for the documentary An Honest Liar, directed by Justin Weinstein and Tyler Measom, which tells the story of Randi’s life. In an interview, Polidoro stated, “One of the most interesting things is that going through the research about Randi's life, his stories, when he tells them, that's quite something because many times you see they are different, but the original ones, they're even more interesting, more surprising! And that's how memory works.”

The biography will be co-authored by Scheinberg with an introduction by Jillette.

In September 2017, Polidoro was able to interview James Randi for attendees at the 17th European Skeptics Congress.

Polidoro shares 13 lessons he learned from Randi on the art of thinking and living in his 2022 book Geniale (Brilliant). Each chapter of the book can be seen as a magic and science lesson that can teach the reader something about life: give it a try, without any expectations; cultivate your passions; always try; be humble and recognize your limits; change your perspective and seize the opportunities; criticize the claims, not the person; be selfless for the sake of being selfless; learn to make rational choices; don't disperse your attention; identify priorities; put order inside and outside yourself; persist in the face of difficulties and nourish absolute curiosity.

== Television ==
Polidoro is the host, special guest, author or consultant of many TV shows, both in Italy and abroad. His international series, Legend Detectives, devoted to the investigation of famous European legends, including Dracula, Robin Hood, the Pied Piper, Rennes-le-Château, the Blood of Saint Januarius and the Man in the Iron Mask, was broadcast on the Discovery Channel.

For the 50th anniversary of the Apollo 11 Moon landing, Massimo Polidoro introduced the documentary on the subject, Il giorno in cui camminammo sulla Luna(The day we walked on the Moon) and together with Paolo Attivissimo hosted the program Luna: ci siamo andati davvero? (Moon: did we really go there?), both broadcast by the channel Focus. In 2019 he hosted the documentary Base Tuono. Un segreto della Guerra fredda (Tuono Base. A secret of the Cold War), regarding an Italian Air Force and NATO ex-missile base in Trentino-Alto Adige as well as a series of documentaries dedicated to the genius of Leonardo da Vinci, Leonardo: l'uomo che anticipò il futuro (Leonardo: the man who anticipated the future).

Since 2017, Polidoro is a featured guest on Superquark, the most popular science television show in Italy, created and hosted by Piero Angela, where he discusses fake news, pseudoscience and how to develop rational thinking skills.

== Internet ==
Polidoro, when asked about his community on social media replied:

I discovered that it [social media] is a very effective tool for talking to those who are interested in the things you talk about, but above all, to build a dialogue, a relationship. These are all things that would be too difficult to do on TV. On TV you talk, people listen to you, follow you, while on the web you can establish a lasting relationship, and people start to follow you on different channels, participating in communities such as those on Facebook, Instagram, YouTube, and I see that many people come back, write to me and I always respond to everyone.

=== Podcasts ===
Polidoro is the author of a number of podcasts in Italian: in 2006 I Misteri di Massimo Polidoro (Massimo Polidoro's Mysteries) dealing with the investigation of mysterious subjects both by himself and by other colleagues that contribute to the show. The podcast was broadcast as a radio show for three years, through 2014, on an Italian-language Swiss radio station. In 2014 L'esploratore dell'insolito (The Explorer of the Unusual), deals with strange or unusual, historical enigmas, unsolved crimes, methods for the exploration, and investigation of mysteries and writing. In 2020 Ai confini (On the frontier), which explores unsolved mysteries of the past, historic or scientific stories that are on the borderline between reality and fantasy. Other Podacasts include: La prova: storia di una autopsia aliena (Proof: Story of an Alien Autopsy), Questa è scienza! (This is Science!), Complotti(Conspiracies), and Questa è scienza!2.

=== YouTube ===
During school closures due to the COVID-19 pandemic, Polidoro created a mini-course on YouTube entitled Ok, scienza! This series explained to kids how the scientific method works. Other topics Polidoro covers in his YouTube videos include Harry Houdini, the September 11 attacks, the Moon landing conspiracy theories, chemtrails, the Hamer method, Paul McCartney, time travel, and pareidolia.

== Other interests ==
Polidoro's experiences investigating mysteries, legends and other paranormal phenomena inspired the main character in a novel by Giacomo Gardumi, L’eredità di Bric (Bric's Legacy). The character Mark Pollard of the Martin Mystere comic, The Great Houdini, created by Alfredo Castelli, was also inspired by Polidoro.

In his teenage years, Polidoro started and led a Beatles fan club, Beatles Staff Organization, that was active from 1984 to 1988. The club had approximately 100 members from around Italy and issued Help!, a fan magazine whose articles, in-depth reviews, and news were dedicated to the band. At the time, Polidoro wrote the articles using a typewriter, and in doing the layout of the magazine, he would physically cut and paste, photocopy, and hand-bind each copy. A total of 24 issues of Help! were published.

== See also ==
- CICAP
- Committee for Skeptical Inquiry
- James Randi Educational Foundation
