= Mumbles Pier =

Victorian pleasure pier in Swansea, Wales

Coordinates: 51°34′11.00″N 3°58′49.00″W

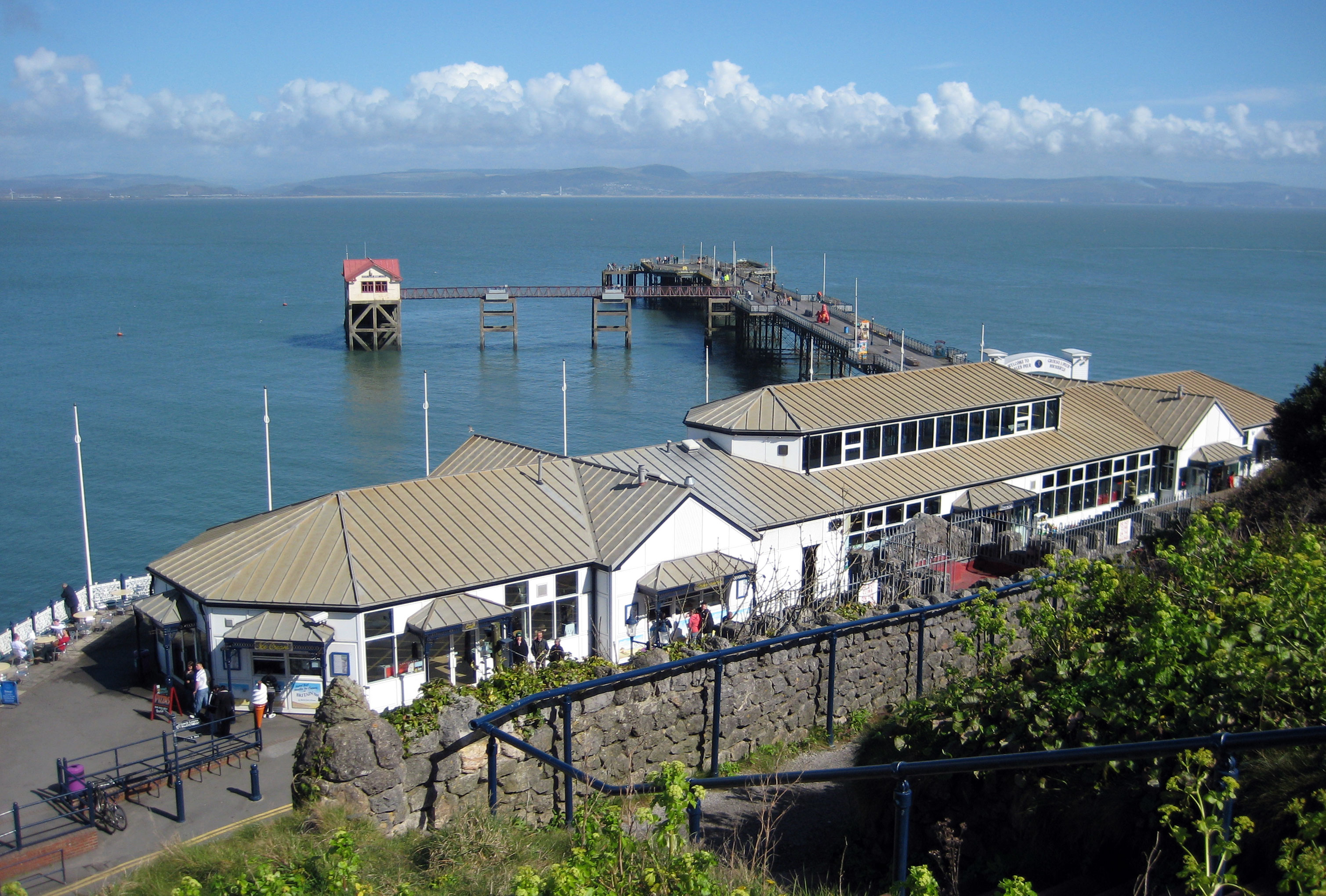
- Pier with amusement arcade and cafe in Spring 2008.
- Type: Pleasure Pier with RNLI lifeboat station
- Location: Mumbles, Wales
- Official name: Mumbles Pier
- Owner: Amusement Equipment Co. Ltd. (AMECO)
- Website: www.mumbles-pier.co.uk

Characteristics
- Total length: 835 ft (255 m)

History
- Designer: W. Sutcliffe Marsh
- Opening date: 10 May 1898

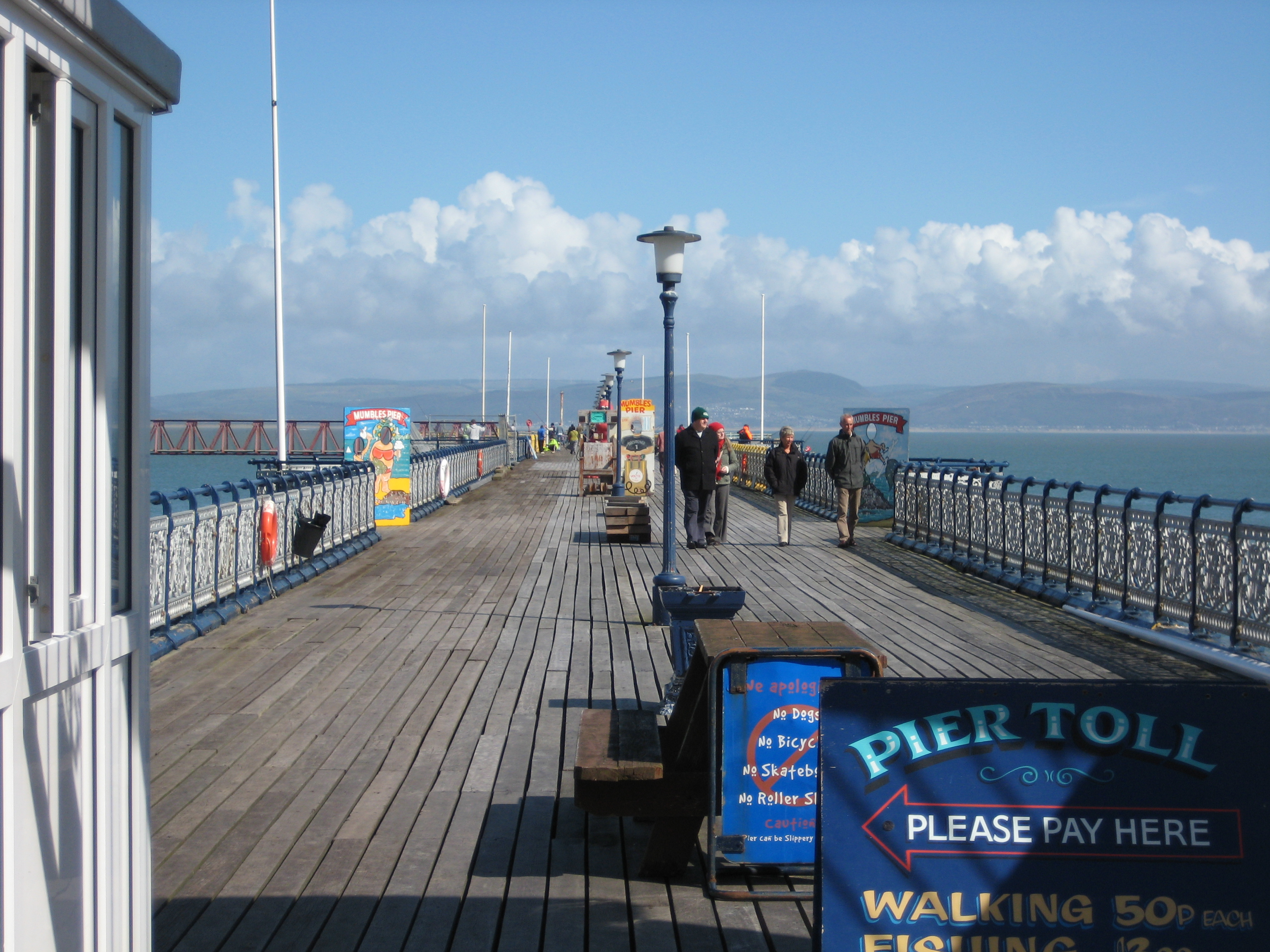
Walkway of the Mumbles pier

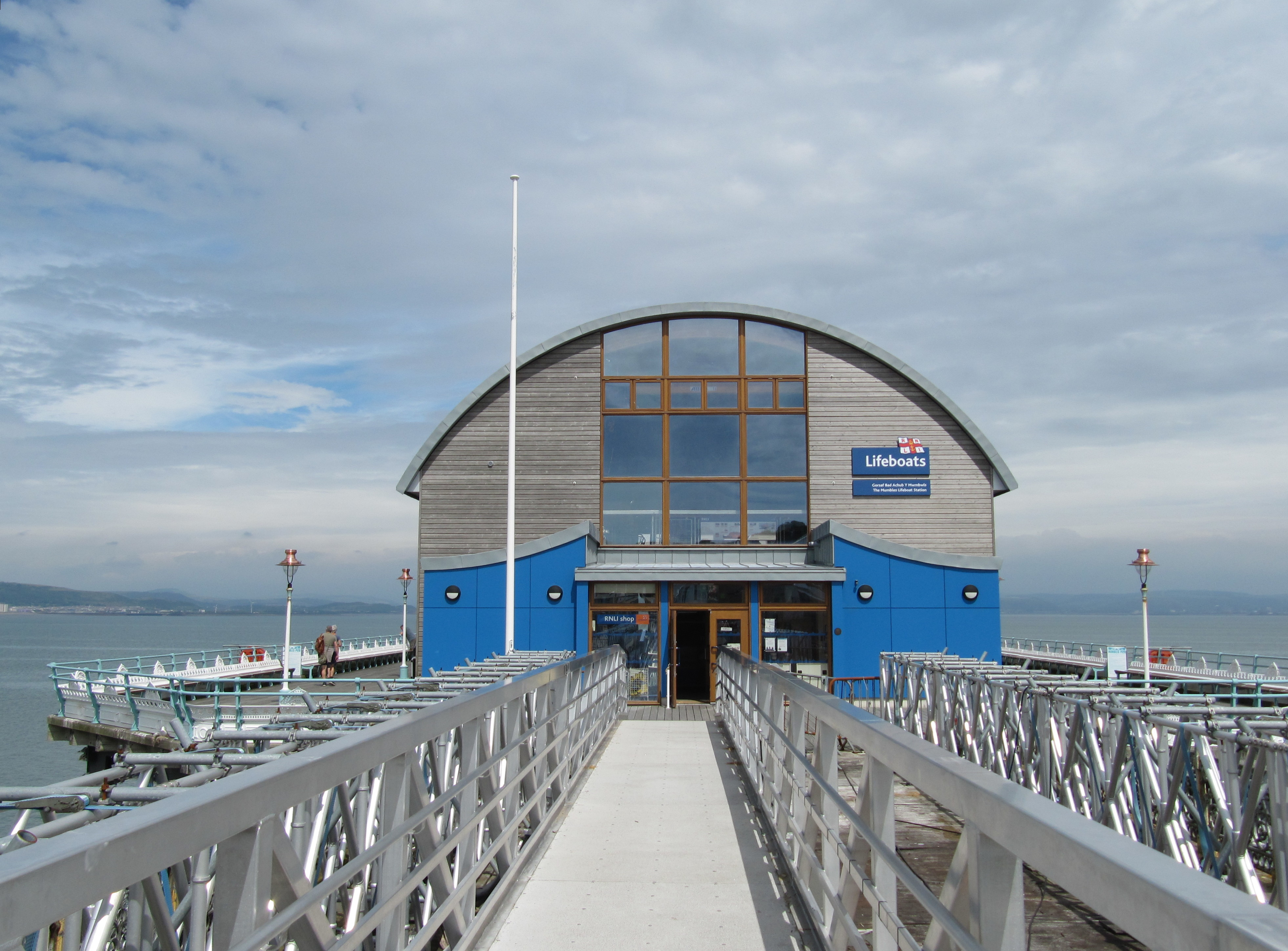
Mumbles Lifeboat Station, at the end of the pier

The Grade II listed structure of Mumbles Pier is an 835 feet (255 m) long Victorian pleasure pier built in 1898. It is located at the south-western corner of Swansea Bay near the village of Mumbles, within the city and county of Swansea, Wales. The pier is used for fishing and tourism, offering panoramic views of Swansea Bay with the Mumbles Lighthouse on one side and Port Talbot on the other.

== History ==
Mumbles Railway and Pier Act 1889
- Act of Parliament
- Parliament of the United Kingdom
- Long title: An Act for making a Railway from the Oystermouth Railway or Tramroad to the Mumbles Head, with a Pier in connexion therewith, and for other purposes.
- Citation: 52 & 53 Vict. c. cxciv

Dates
- Royal assent: 26 August 1889

Text of statute as originally enacted

The railway and pier were authorised by the Mumbles Railway and Pier Act 1889 (52 & 53 Vict. c. cxciv). It was to include a railway to connect to the existing Oystermouth Railway at Black Pill.

=== Construction ===
Designed by W. Sutcliffe Marsh and promoted by John Jones Jenkins of the Rhondda and Swansea Bay Railway, the pier opened on 10 May 1898 at a cost of £10,000. It was the western terminus for the world's first passenger carrying horsecar railway, the Swansea and Mumbles Railway; and a major terminal for the White Funnel paddle steamers of P & A Campbell, unloading tourists from routes along the River Severn and Bristol Channel.

=== Heyday ===
In the summer of 1899, Will C. Pepper, father of the musicians Harry S. Pepper and Dick Pepper, founded a long-running concert party on the pier called the White Coons.

The Amusement Equipment Company (AMECO) gained a licence to operate the pier from 1 October 1937. The pier was requisitioned in World War II, but AMECO acquired the freehold in 1957, extensively reconstructing the facility and adding a landing jetty. A new arcade was built on the pier's frontage in 1966. AMECO spent between £25,000 and £30,000 per annum on the maintenance and replacement of the steelwork between 1975 and 1985.

=== Renovation ===
The pier closed on 1 October 1987 for a £40,000 refit, which included renewal of the steel around the entrance. The pier reopened on Good Friday 1988.

By the early 21st century the pier had fallen into a state of disrepair with a large section fenced off to visitors and other areas patched up to maintain safety. The owners planned to repair the pier and to regenerate the nearby area. The plans included the building of a new hotel and spa, a conference and exhibition centre and a new boardwalk linking the Knab rock with the pier.

During a major renovation in 2012, a new lifeboat station and RNLI gift shop was built at the end of the pier and fishing platforms added.

=== 2022 fire ===
In August 2022, both the fish restaurant and nightclub at the base of the pier were destroyed by fire, although the pier itself was undamaged.

== Lifeboat station ==
The Mumbles Lifeboat Station at the end of the pier houses a Tamar-class lifeboat. The old lifeboat station building is on the north side of the pier, to which it is connected by a walkway. In 2019 plans were announced to convert the old lifeboat station into a visitor centre and restaurant.

== Arcade ==
=== Cafe (then: Buffet) arcade ===
- Neo Geo MVS (1992–1996) (Neo Geo MVS – 6 Slot: Blue's Journey (1990), Cyber-Lip (1990), Ninja Combat (1990), Ghost Pilots (1991), League Bowling (1990) and Eight Man (1991))
- Wonder Boy (1996) (Standard Cabinet)

=== Amusement arcade facilities ===
==== Arcade games ====
- Monkey Mole Panic (1992) (Standard Cabinet)
- Neo Geo MVS (1992–1996) (Neo Geo MVS – 6 Slot: Blue's Journey (1990), Cyber-Lip (1990), Ninja Combat (1990), Ghost Pilots (1991), League Bowling (1990) and Eight Man (1991)) (Standard Cabinet)
- Super Street Fighter II (1993) (Deluxe Cabinet)
- Super Street Fighter II Turbo (1994) (Deluxe Cabinet)
- Tekken 2 (1995) (Standard Cabinet)
- Wonder Boy (1986) (Standard Cabinet)

==== Pinball ====
- Street Fighter II Pinball (1993) (Pinball Cabinet)

==== Children's rides ====
- Noddy kiddie ride (1990s)
