= Gordon Crier =

Scottish radio & television producer & writer (1912–1984)

Gordon Crier (1912 – 16 September 1984) was a Scottish radio and television producer and writer.

His early successes included Band Waggon, the first comedy show designed for radio, broadcast by the BBC from 1938 to 1940, co-produced by Crier and Harry S. Pepper. After the first three shows had flopped, the scriptwriter was dismissed and a team of Crier, Vernon Harris, Arthur Askey, and Richard Murdoch was brought in. They made Band Waggon the most popular radio show of the 1930s.

In 1950 Crier was a founding member of the Lord's Taverners, with John Snagge, Roy Plomley, Brian Johnston, and others, a group of actors and BBC men who enjoyed watching cricket from the Tavern pub at Lord's Cricket Ground.

In January 1952, Crier was arrested in Germany by the Russians, while organizing a tour by Gracie Fields, but was soon released.

By 1953, Crier was working for an advertising agency, but he remained a friend of Ronnie Waldman and continued to feed ideas for programmes to the BBC.

== Selected credits ==
- Variety (television series, 1937) – producer
- Band Waggon (radio series, 1938–1940) – co-producer and writer
- Band Waggon (film, 1940) – writer
- What Would You Do, Chums? (radio series, 1939) – writer
- The Wind in the Willows (radio adaptation, 1941)
- Peter Pan (radio adaptation, 1941)
- Telecrime (TV series, 1946) (producer – 6 episodes)
- Farewell to the Pegasus (TV movie, 1947) producer
- Cinderella (TV movie, 1950) – scriptwriter
