= Band Waggon (film) =

1940 British film by Marcel Varnel

- UK trade show poster
- Directed by: Marcel Varnel
- Written by: John Watt; Harry S. Pepper; Gordon Crier; Vernon Harris; J. O. C. Orton; Val Guest; Marriott Edgar; Robert Edmunds
- Produced by: Edward Black
- Starring: Arthur Askey; Richard Murdoch
- Cinematography: Arthur Crabtree; Henry Harris
- Edited by: R. E. Dearing
- Production company: Gainsborough Pictures
- Distributed by: General Film Distributors
- Release date: 23 March 1940 (UK)
- Running time: 85 minutes (UK)
- Country: United Kingdom
- Language: English

Band Waggon is a 1940 British comedy film directed by Marcel Varnel and starring Arthur Askey, Richard Murdoch and Moore Marriott. It was written by John Watt, Harry S. Pepper, Gordon Crier, Vernon Harris, J. O. C. Orton, Val Guest, Marriott Edgar and Bob Edmunds, based on the BBC radio show Band Waggon.

It was the first of several popular films Askey made for Gainsborough.

== Plot ==
Arthur Askey and Stinker Murdoch, two out-of-work performers, are living on the roof of the Broadcasting House in Central London. After being called in for an audition with the BBC three months before, they were forgotten about and settled down to live there waiting for their big chance. One day an item from their clothes line falls and hits Claude Pilkington, a senior figure at the BBC, who has them evicted. They are forced to pack up all their belongings and leave.

While driving home that evening one of the tyres on Pilkington's car gets a puncture from broken glass lying on the road. It has been put there by the owners of the Jack-in-the-Box restaurant, who hope their cabaret act will be given a contract with the BBC and have so far failed to gain an audition. Pilkington sits unwittingly through their act, including singers Jack Hylton and Patricia Kirkwood, barely noticing it while he reads the newspaper. When he discovers that they have caused his puncture, he storms off in anger.

Meanwhile, Askey and Murdoch have found themselves in the countryside. Needing somewhere to live they go to a local estate agent hoping to pick up a cheap cottage. Instead they are offered a castle for £3 rent, which the owner is trying to get off his hands as it is haunted. After they settle down in the castle they begin a sequence of sinister happenings occur despite the estate agent's insistence that there is a "perfectly natural explanation for everything". When they encounter Jasper Blackfang, a ghost who claims to haunt the place, they flee and take shelter at the nearby Jack-in-the Box restaurant.

Emboldened by the realization that the ghost is in fact the caretaker of the castle, who has been living there rent free, they return along with Hylton and Kirkwood. They discover a television studio inside the castle, which the caretaker claims is being used by a pirate commercial station. In fact it is being used by Nazi agents in Britain, but the caretaker is unaware of this.

Frustrated by their failure to secure an audition at the BBC, they decide to use the studios to broadcast their own show. Arthur Askey does a performance on the same wavelength as the BBC television station, interrupting a programme by Pilkington himself, who has to be faded out. Pilkington is furious by the interruption, but the pirate show generates huge interest amongst the general public. Pilkington, meanwhile, gets Scotland Yard to hunt down the pirate station. Their determination to find the station is boosted by the realisation that the castle contains plans of British planes stolen by the Nazi agents, and Askey unwittingly holds up the plans during his broadcast.

Askey has organised a major hour-long performance which ends in a finale with where the police, BBC officials and Nazi agents all converge on the castle, while a time bomb is ominously ticking down. The programme is such a roaring success that the BBC eventually agree to Askey, Murdoch and their associates having their own show.

== Cast ==
- Arthur Askey as Himself
- Richard Murdoch as Stinker Murdoch
- Patricia Kirkwood as Pat
- Moore Marriott as Jasper
- Freddy Schweitzer as Himself, Accordion Player
- Bruce Trent as Himself
- Michael Standing as Himself
- C.H. Middleton as Himself
- Jasmine Bligh as Herself
- Jonah Barrington as Himself
- Peter Gawthorne as Claude Pilkington
- Donald Calthrop as Hobday
- Wally Patch as Commissionaire
- Jack Hylton and His Band
- Jack Hylton as Himself, Bandleader
- The Sherman Fisher Girls as Dancers

== Soundtrack ==
- "The Melody Maker" – by Noel Gay and Frank Eyton – performed by Jack Hylton, Patricia Kirkwood and Chorus with Jack Hylton and His Band and The Sherman Fisher Girls
- "The Only One Who's Difficult Is You" – by Noel Gay and Clifford Grey – performed by Richard Murdoch, Patricia Kirkwood and Arthur Askey with Jack Hylton and His Band
- "After Dark" – by Noel Gay
- "Heaven Will Be Heavenly" – by Harry Parr Davies and Roma Campbell Hunter – performed by Patricia Kirkwood and chorus
- "A Pretty Bird" – by Kenneth Blane – performed by Arthur Askey
- "Boomps-A-Daisy" – by Annette Mills – performed by Patricia Kirkwood, Richard Murdoch, Jack Hylton and Arthur Askey
- "Band Waggon (theme song)" – by Harry S. Pepper – performed by the chorus during the opening credits and reprised at the end by Jack Hylton and His Band
- "Big Hearted Arthur" – by Robert Rutherford and Frank Wilcock – performed by Arthur Askey
- "Old King Cole" (traditional nursery song) – performed by Arthur Askey, Richard Murdoch and the trio of Charlie Forsythe, Addie Seamon and Eleanor Farrell

== Reception ==
The Monthly Film Bulletin wrote: "This is a thoroughly enjoyable crazy entertainment. Big-hearted Arthur and Stinker seen on the screen will not disappoint their many radio admirers. The former works tirelessly, and puts over an exuberantly and riotously funny performance. The latter is quieter, but an effective foil and backer-up. To make assurance doubly sure Jack Hylton and his Band perform energetically, the jibes at the B.B.C. are amusing and good-humoured, 'and the burlesque espionage topical and timely. The only adverse criticism is that the scenes in the castle which are less original than the others are somewhat prolonged, and hold up the development."

Kine Weekly wrote: "Arthur Askey and Richard Murdoch bring much of their inimitable radio humour to the screen and co-operate smoothly with Jack Hylton and his Band, and Pat Kirkwood. Moore Marriott also has his moments as the caretaker, and so does Freddie Schweitzer, Hylton's crazy instrumentalist. Peter Gawthorne is well cast as the pompous and stubborn Mr. Pilkington. ...Taken all round, the show is an enjoyable rag, with a cast, title and songs that are sure guarantee of house-full business."

The Radio Times Guide to Films gave the film 3/5 stars, writing: "Although it only ran for some two years, Band Waggon, with its quirky characters and rapid-fire humour, was hugely popular. Here, the script restricts the fabled ad libbing of Arthur Askey and Richard "Stinker" Murdoch, but it's still good fun as the pair stray from their famous flat in the eaves of Broadcasting House only to encounter spies in a haunted castle."

In British Sound Films: The Studio Years 1928–1959 David Quinlan rated the film as "good", writing: "Good fun, just the thing for wartime audiences."

Leslie Halliwell said: "Film version of a long-running coedy series: quite a serviceable record of a phenomenon."

According to Kinematograph Weekly the film did well at the British box office in March 1940.
