= The Kentucky Minstrels =

- Genre: Variety
- Country of origin: United Kingdom
- Language(s): English
- Home station: BBC Home Service
- Starring: Percy Parsons; C. Denier Warren; Scott and Whaley etc.
- Original release: 6 January 1933 – 25 December 1950
- No. of episodes: 105

The Kentucky Minstrels was a popular series of BBC radio programmes broadcast regularly in Britain between 1933 and 1950.

Despite the fact that the show could only be heard and not seen, it retained the conventional format of minstrel shows, with a "white" compere or "Interlocutor", and "black" comedy "end men" and entertainers. The first show, in January 1933, was compered by Percy Parsons; later hosts included James Carew, Nosmo King (H. Vernon Watson), and Fred Yule. The most frequent comic entertainers were Scott and Whaley, an African American duo who performed as Pussyfoot and Cuthbert. Music was performed by Ike Hatch (also African American), together with the Kentucky Banjo Team and Minstrels Choir. The regular "stump speech" was given by C. Denier Warren, who also wrote the script. The show was produced by Harry S. Pepper. It ran for over 100 episodes until 1950.

The show was "an exaggerated depiction of African Americans in the "good ole days" of plantation life in the U.S. South (Kentucky), accentuated with the use of stereotyped racist and sexual humor." The popularity of the show led to the same team, including Pepper, Warren, Scott and Whaley, producing a film in 1934, Kentucky Minstrels. Aspects of the show foreshadowed the later, "less distorted", BBC TV programme, The Black and White Minstrel Show, broadcast in Britain between 1958 and 1978.
