= Ernest Dudley =

English dramatist, actor and journalist (1908–2006)

- Born: Vivian Ernest Coltman-Allen; 23 July 1908; Dudley, Worcestershire, England
- Died: 1 February 2006 (aged 97)
- Occupations: Actor, writer, journalist
- Spouse: Jane Graham (m. 1930; died 1981)
- Children: 1
- Writing career
- Pen name: Ernest Dudley
- Notable work: Dr Morelle

Vivian Ernest Coltman-Allen (23 July 1908 – 1 February 2006), known professionally as Ernest Dudley, was an English actor, dramatist, novelist, journalist and screenwriter.

== Biography ==
=== Personal life ===
Vivian Ernest Coltman-Allen was born in Dudley, Worcestershire, and educated at Taplow School. He began his theatrical career acting in repertory in Ireland, later joining Charles Doran's Shakespeare company. He met and married the actress Jane Graham, while they were on tour in 1930.

He and his wife had a daughter together. He was widowed in 1981 and remained working on novels, stories and scripts until his death, aged 97.

=== Career ===
The actor and scriptwriter Ernest Dudley was the creator of the hit BBC radio crime series Dr Morelle and also the television series The Armchair Detective. The Dr Morelle — 'the man you love to hate!' — series which was hugely popular during the 1940s and 1950s and originally starred Dennis Arundell in the title role. In the fifties the role was given to Cecil Parker, who co-starred with Sheila Sim.

Dudley created Dr Morelle for a BBC Radio anthology programme Monday Night at Eight during the Second World War. He featured the character in many short stories and numerous novels as well as a stage play Dr Morelle, which he co-wrote with Arthur Watkyn.

He appeared in the West End in numerous small parts, before taking a job with The Daily Mail during the late 1930s as a society reporter. He also began writing plays and crime series for BBC Radio. His popular radio series The Armchair Detective attracted more than ten million listeners a week. A TV series followed, as well as a film in 1952. In 1956 he bought a Jowett Jupiter with an unusual special body by Harold Radford. This had the merit (to Dudley) of being completely unlike any other car, and therefore unidentifiable.

== Films ==
- The Armchair Detective (1952)... as himself

== Novels ==
- The Harassed Hero (1954)
- The Dark Bureau (1950)

== Radio Plays ==
- Crime Chasers Ltd
- SOS Sally
- Mr Walker Wants to Know
- Monday Night at Eight ... Dr Morelle, with Dennis Arundell
- The Armchair Detective (1942)
- The Flies of Isis (1966), for the BBC Light Programme's Midweek Theatre
- The House of Unspeakable Secrets (1967), with Leslie Phillips

== Screenplays ==
- Concerning Mr. Martin (1937)
- Lassie from Lancashire (1938)
- Dial 999 (1938)
- The Armchair Detective (1952)
- Schlitz Playhouse of Stars...Secrets of the Old Bailey (1958)...television episode (story)

== Stage plays ==
- Dr Morelle
- The Return of Sherlock Holmes

== Television series ==
- The Armchair Detective
