= Ike Hatch =

American jazz musician (1892–1961)

- Born: Isaac Flower Hatch; August 21, 1892; New York City, U.S.
- Died: December 26, 1961 (aged 69); Paddington, London, England
- Other name: Ike "Yowsah" (or "Yows Suh") Hatch
- Occupations: Singer, pianist, club owner

Isaac Flower Hatch (August 21, 1892 – December 26, 1961), known as Ike "Yowsah" Hatch, was an American singer, pianist, and club owner, based for most of his life in Britain.

== Biography ==
He was born in New York City, and studied singing under Abbie Mitchell. A tenor, he won first prize in a 1919 singing competition in Camp Mills, Long Island, played with Wilbur Sweatman's band at the Eltinge Theatre, and recorded as a banjoist with W. C. Handy's Memphis Blues Band. In 1925, he was recruited by pianist Elliot Carpenter to form a duo to play and record in Britain and Europe. They travelled to England, where they toured widely, performing both popular songs and classical arias, and made recordings for the Zonophone label.

The duo split up in 1930, and Carpenter returned to the United States where he reputedly played the piano part mimed by Dooley Wilson in Casablanca. Hatch established himself as a regular performer in London nightclubs, and starred with Florence Mills in the touring stage musical Blackbirds, with a band that included pianist Will Vodery and saxophonist Rudolph Dunbar. He also contributed musical numbers to the popular and long-lasting BBC radio series The Kentucky Minstrels, starring comedians Scott and Whaley.

In the early 1930s, Hatch opened his own club, The Nest, in Kingly Street, Soho. He became a well-known figure and was invited by Nancy Cunard to sit on the London campaign committee supporting the Scottsboro Boys. By 1935, he had opened a second club, the Shim-Sham (named after a popular dance), at 37 Wardour Street. The reputed owner or co-owner of the club was Jack Isow (Russian-born Joseph Aaron Isowitzsky), responsible for several clubs in the area, while Hatch was its public face. The Shim-Sham Club developed a reputation for hosting top jazz musicians, its openness to radical politics, and for its free and easy atmosphere in which white and black customers mingled, there was a casual attitude towards alcohol licensing laws, and there was tolerance of unconventional lifestyles. It was frequently subject to raids by the police, who regarded it as "a den of vice and iniquity".

Hatch recorded in London in 1936 and 1937, as Ike "Yows Suh" Hatch and his Harlem Stompers, initially for Parlophone and then on the Regal Zonophone label. His recordings were a mixture of humorous songs and jazz standards. He also worked as an actor, appearing in the 1937 Paul Robeson film Jericho. He continued to operate, and perform in, clubs and cabaret venues in London through the 1940s and 1950s, and made occasional television appearances as a musician. He performed nightly at the Starlite Rooms in Mayfair for the five years leading up to his death, at home in Paddington aged 69, in 1961.
