= Lord's Taverners =

UK youth cricket and disability sports charity

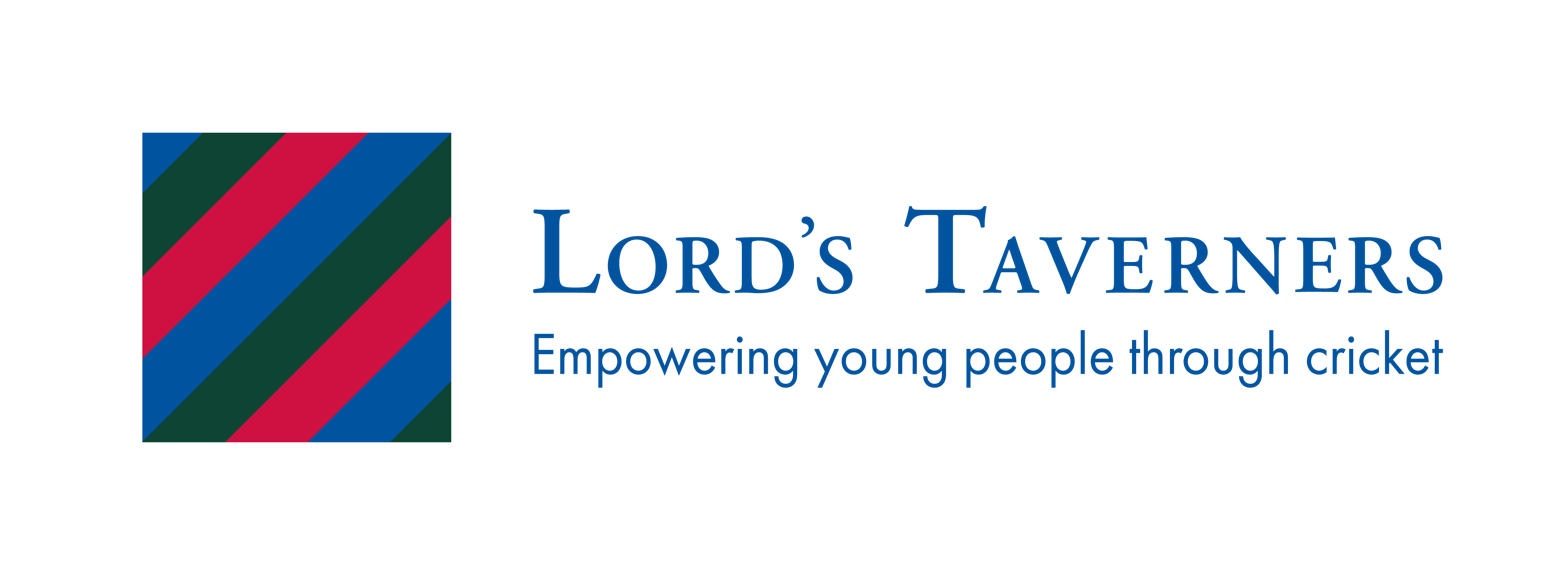
- Formation: 1950; 76 years ago
- Type: Charity
- Headquarters: Fivefields, London
- Region served: UK
- Website: Official website

The Lord's Taverners is a UK youth cricket and disability sports charity. Its charitable objective is to empower and positively impact the lives of young people facing challenges of inequality.

Lord's Taverners was founded in 1950 by a group of actors and BBC employees, led by founding chairman and member No. 1 Martin Boddey and including John Mills, Jack Hawkins, John Snagge, Roy Plomley, Gordon Crier and Brian Johnston. The founders were inspired by watching cricket from the Lord's Tavern pub in St John's Wood Road, close by Lord's Cricket Ground.

The charity's headquarters are located in London, with support in over 50 regions. The Lord's Taverners also benefit from the fundraising activities of Regional Committees and its 5,000 members, many of them working in sport and entertainment. The list includes Sir Michael Parkinson, Sir Alastair Cook, Sir Andrew Strauss, Greg James, Miles Jupp, Dame Tanni Grey-Thompson, Jonathan Agnew and Mike Gatting.

== History ==
The Lord's Taverners was formed in 1950, the week after the West Indies' victory over England in the second Lord's Test Match. Initially, money raised each year was given to the National Playing Fields Association (now known as Fields in Trust) on the recommendation of Prince Philip, Duke of Edinburgh, patron and 'Twelfth Man' of the Lord's Taverners.

The existence of the Lord's Taverners and the involvement of early members can be broadly summarised by the following:

We've all got professional and sporting interests in common. So why not start a club, based at the beloved old tavern here. We can talk about our work and watch the cricket. And we can try to put a few bob back into the game at the same time.

By the time of the first annual dinner in September 1951, the Lord's Taverners had developed a membership programme - mirrored in much of the charity's activities today. Within the first year, the membership included Laurence Olivier, Jack Hawkins, Trevor Howard, Tommy Trinder and Richard Attenborough from the acting world, alongside cricket writers John Arlott, Brian Johnston, R. C. Robertson-Glasgow, Rex Alston, and Pelham Warner. The mix of business and cricket continues to be the core of the charity membership, whilst other sports such as golf are also represented.

The first official cricket match in the history of the charity was played in August 1952 against Bishops Stortford CC. Denis Compton scored 36 in one over. Subsequently, celebrity cricket matches emerged and continue to be one of the core fundraising activities of the Taverners. Teams are a mixture of former Test and County cricketers with stars of stage, screen and sound along with those from other sports. Under the stewardship of former Kent wicketkeeper Derek Ufton, the Taverners hit their first £100,000 target in a season. Under his successor John Price, the charity now exceeds this figure each year.

From 1972, under Secretary (and later Director) Captain Anthony Swainson RN, the charity's membership expanded through the newly created category of 'Friends of the Lord's Taverners', whilst the charity expanded outwards from London, developing a series of regional bases. Thus the Taverners turned from a club to a "major charity".

There are now 50 regions, fundraising entities in their own right, who collectively raise over £1m per year. The membership change and geographical expansion was accompanied by the development of the Lord's Taverners charitable remit in 1975 (beyond support for the NPFA) when money was first channelled towards providing recreation for young people with disabilities. This programme initially focused on the provision of the 'trademark' green minibuses which provide recreational opportunities for organisations looking after young people with special needs. The 1,000th minibus was delivered at the climax of the 2012 cricket season;

== Charitable programmes ==
The Lord's Taverners works closely with the England and Wales Cricket Board (ECB). Every year, the Lord's Taverners donates over £3 million to help young people of all abilities and backgrounds participate in sporting activities.

=== Community cricket ===
- Wicketz - a cricket programme that aims to support young people in disadvantaged areas of the UK where clubs provide a safe, structured environment where for young people to enjoy the physical and social benefits of playing cricket while developing life skills.

=== Disability cricket ===
- Super 1s - gives young people with a disability the chance to play regular, competitive cricket. By creating community cricket hubs we give participants the chance to compete against their peers and enjoy the benefits of playing sport.
- Table Cricket - played on a table tennis table, Table Cricket is an adaptive form of cricket enabling young people with physical and learning disabilities to take part in the sport with regional competitions culminating in a finals day every year at the Nursery Pavilion at Lord's Cricket Ground.

=== Cricket kit recycling ===
In November 2024, it was announced that the Lord's Taverners cricket kit recycling programme would wind down in spring 2025, due to no longer aligning to the charity's strategy.

== The Lady Taverners ==
UK Prime Minister Margaret Thatcher was a key figure in the formation of the Lady Taverners. Traditionally, each Prime Minister has been made a member of the Lord's Taverners. As a result of Thatcher's electoral victory in 1979, the Honorary Lady Taverners were formed. In early 1980, David Evans invited Thatcher to become the first Honorary Lady Taverner.

Thatcher became a Lady Taverner alongside twenty three other ladies, invited by then Lord's Taverners president Eric Morecambe. They were ladies who had helped at cricket matches and those who had organised a tombola at the President's Ball, including Ann Barrington, Anne Subba Row, Rachael Heyhoe Flint, Marjorie Gover, Judith Chalmers, Betty Surridge and Joan Morecambe.

The Lady Taverners would combine with the Lord Taverners in 2021. The contribution of the Lady Taverners over more than 30 years is regarded as being appreciated by the charity and its beneficiaries.

== Governance ==
=== The Lord's Taverners presidents ===
- Sir John Mills (1950–1951)
- John Snagge (1952)
- Martin Boddey (1953)
- Jack Hawkins (1954)
- Major A Huskisson (1955)
- Tommy Trinder (1956)
- Stephen Mitchell (1957)
- Sir John Barbirolli (1958)
- Sir Ian Jacob (1959)
- The Duke of Edinburgh (1960–1961)
- Sir Robert Menzies (1962)
- Richard Hearne (1963)
- John Snagge (1964)
- Sir Edward Lewis (1965)
- Ronnie Waldman (1966)
- Sir Harry Secombe (1967–1968)
- Lord Luke of Pavenham (1969)
- Brian Rix, Baron Rix (1970)
- Martin Boddey (1971)
- Victor Silvester (1972)
- Jimmy Edwards (1973)
- Alf Gover (1974)
- The Prince of Wales (1975–1976)
- Eric Morecambe (1977–1979)
- Sir Harry Secombe (1980–1981)
- Ronnie Corbett (1982)
- Sir Terry Wogan (1983–1984)
- Sir David Frost (1985–1986)
- Ronnie Corbett (1987)
- Sir Tim Rice (1988–1990)
- Leslie Crowther (1991–1992)
- The Prince Edward (1993–1994)
- Colin Cowdrey, Baron Cowdrey of Tonbridge (1995–1997)
- Nicholas Parsons (1998–1999)
- Sir Tim Rice (2000)
- Robert Powell (2001–2002)
- Sir Richard Stilgoe (2003–2004)
- Mike Gatting (2005–2007)
- Bill Tidy (2007–2009)
- Chris Tarrant (2009–2011)
- Barry Norman (2011–2012)
- Chris Cowdrey (2012–2015)
- Sir Michael Parkinson (2015–2018)
- Sir Trevor McDonald (2018–2020)
- David Gower (2020–present)

In 2007 Sir Bobby Robson was to have succeeded Mike Gatting as president, although was unable to do so due to his ill-health. The charity later praised Robson posthumously with a March 2010 formal dinner in aid of the Sir Bobby Robson Foundation, in honour of "The best President we never had".

=== The Lord's Taverners chairs ===
- Martin Boddey (1950–1952)
- Michael Shepley (1953)
- Stephen Mitchell (1954)
- John Glyn-Jones (1955)
- John Snagge (1956)
- Jack Payne (1958–1959)
- Ronnie Waldman (1959)
- John Snagge (1960–1961)
- Leslie Frewin (1962)
- Roy Rich (1963–1964)
- A. C. L. Bennett (1965–1966)
- Ronnie Waldman (1967)
- Jack Rayfield (1968–1969)
- Ian Carmichael (1970–1971)
- Mark Mothio (1972–1973)
- Peter Palmer (1974–1975)
- John Josling (1976–1977)
- Chris Howland (1978–1979)
- Neil Durden-Smith (1980–1981)
- David Evans (1982–1983)
- John Bromley (1984–1985)
- Mervyn Grubb (1986–1987)
- Robin Moors (1988–1989)
- Derek Ufton (1990–1991)
- Brian Baldock (1992–1994)
- Ken Lawrence (1995–1996)
- John Bromley (1997–1999)
- Roger Smith (2000–2001)
- John Ayling (2002–2003)
- Richard Groom (2004–2006)
- Jonathan Rice (2006–2008)
- John Hooper (2008–2010)
- John Ayling (2010–2012)
- Tom Rodwell (2012–2014)
- Roger Smith (2014–2016)
- Martin Smith (2016–2017)
- David Collier (2018–2020)
- Tim Luckhurst (2020–2025)
- Lucy Pearson (2025–present)

=== The Lady Taverners presidents ===
- Joan Morecambe (1987–1992)
- Judith Chalmers (1992–2001)
- Rachael Heyhoe Flint (2001–2011)
- Angela Rippon (2011–2016)
- Lesley Garrett (2016–2018)
- Debbie McGee (2018–2021)

=== The Lady Taverners chairs ===
- Anne Subba Row (1985–1986)
- Diana Thomas (1987–1988)
- Maria Moult (1989–1990)
- Wendy Caller (1991–1992)
- Laura Collins (1993–1994)
- Lesley Balls (1995–1996)
- Chrissie Colbeck (acting) (1997–1998)
- Jean Ratcliff (1998–2000)
- Judy Haggas (2000–2002)
- Dulcie Quinnell (2003–2004)
- Annie Peacock (2004–2005)
- Dame Maggie Smith (2006–2008)
- Denise Horne (2008–2010)
- Sally Surridge (2010–2012)
- Marilyn Fry (2012–2014)
- Carol Robinson (2014–2021)
