= The Armchair Detective =

1952 film by Brendan J. Stafford

- Directed by: Brendan J. Stafford
- Written by: Ernest Dudley; Derek Elphinstone
- Produced by: Derek Elphinstone; Donald Ginsberg
- Starring: Ernest Dudley; Hartley Power; Sally Newton
- Cinematography: Brendan J. Stafford
- Music by: John Hollingsworth
- Production company: Meridian Films
- Distributed by: Apex Film Distributors
- Release date: 1952
- Country: United Kingdom
- Language: English

The Armchair Detective is a 1952 British second feature ('B') mystery film directed by Brendan J. Stafford and starring Ernest Dudley, Hartley Power, and Sally Newton. It was written by Dudley and Derek Elphinstone based on Dudley's BBC radio series of the same name, and made at Viking Studios.

== Cast ==
- Ernest Dudley as himself
- Hartley Power as Nicco
- Sally Newton as Penny
- Derek Elphinstone as Inspector Carter
- Iris Russell as Jane
- David Oxley as Terry
- Lionel Grose as sergeant
- Anna Korda as woman

== Reception ==
The Monthly Film Bulletin wrote: "Second feature British 'Whodunnit,' obviously cheaply made, and poorly directed. The film serves to show how very far the British are behind their slick American counterparts at this type of thing. Sally Newton (daughter of Robert Newton) once or twice shines through the blanket of the script in this, her first film."

Picturegoer wrote: "Ernest Dudley, the Armchair Detective, brings his radio character to screen-life in a competent whodunit. For a few brief moments everything points to something unusual – the piece opens with a bright little scene satirizing a B.B.C. crime serial. But this outbreak of originality is hastily suppressed, and the film subsides into a well-carpentered but routine mystery ... Frankly, the Armchair Detective is an insufferable prig, alternately patronizing and then snubbing the Scotland Yard bunglers. Dudley acts as smoothly as he writes, Hartley Power is caddish enough in a hammy role; and there's a girl called Sally Newton, Satie of Robert Newton, who looks very promising material."

Picture Show wrote: "Ernest Dudley, noted as the B.B.C. Armchair Detective, stars in this melodrama of a night-club singer who believes that she has killed her employer. Neatly directed, efficiently acted."

According to Stephen Chibnall in The British 'B' Film, "critics thought it better heard than seen."
