= Esther Coleman =

British singer

- Born: 8 October 1900; London, England
- Died: 28 February 1989 (aged 88); London, England
- Occupation: Singer

Esther Coleman (8 October 1900 – 28 February 1989), who also performed under the stage name Diana Clare, was a British singer who appeared in numerous radio shows including Band Waggon. She sang with a contralto voice.

She used the name Diana Clare for her performances of blues songs.

She performed with Jack Hylton and his orchestra, and had her own radio show, Come to Sunday Afternoon at Diana Clare's, broadcast on Radio Luxembourg, sponsored by Lux Toilet Soap.

She also appeared on television, and took part in some of the earliest tests of British television.
