= Joe Morley =

British classic banjoist

Joe Morley (December 3, 1867 in Kinver, South Staffordshire, England – September 16, 1937 in London) was a British classic banjoist who achieved great fame and renown in his homeland and abroad. During his lifetime, he composed hundreds of banjo solos.

== Early life ==
Morley's father was a busker playing the concertina and entertaining crowds in the streets. At the age of five, he accompanied his father to Wiltshire, and while his father played on his instrument, the young boy would step-dance dressed in jacket and knickerbockers. In 1887, his father bought him an old seven-string banjo without frets and soon he was learning how to play from different music books he had purchased. Eventually he invented his own finger picking style.

== Professional career ==
About 1890, Morley formed a busker quartet consisting of himself, Fred Sanders, and Ben Hollingworth on banjos, and Alf Wentworth on concertina. They toured North Wales performing tunes composed by Morley. The quartet broke up and he toured West England as a solo act. His popularity grew steadily. He joined the Victorian Minstrels in 1891, performing at Sandown, Isle of Wight. The minstrel band consisted of a banjo, a concertina, a harp, a tambourine, a tin whistle and bones. The band changed its name to the Royal Osborne Minstrels after a successful performance on the Royal yacht Osborne. In 1893, the "Minstrels" disbanded and Morley was hired by the Clifford Essex Pierrots, formed in 1891. He bought himself a six-string banjo with frets, but since he was accustomed to play without frets, he removed them.

Morley was employed by Mr Donald Marshall, Leader and Creator of the Royal Osborne Minstrels. Donald Marshall lived in Cowes I.o.W. and is buried in Northwood cemetery. 2019 is the centenary of his death. there are 78 references in Cuttings to Donald Marshall who also employed an Agent in London to recruit players for him. Clifford Essex approached Morley to obtain his services after hearing him play with Donald's group

== Breakthrough ==
The "Pierrots" went to London in December 1893 for a performance at the Prince's Hall. His fame was instant, followed by numerous private engagements. The following months, he performed at St. James's Hall together with the Moore and Burgess Minstrels. That summer, Morley re-formed the Royal Osborne Minstrels and they appeared in Colwyn Bay. In 1896, he once again joined the Clifford Essex Royal Pierrots - the word "Royal" was added when the "Pierrots" had performed before Royalty - and they appeared at Folkestone. He stayed with them for the next thirteen years and during that period he met the American banjo player Vess Ossman who happened to be in London for an appearance. Morley became influenced by that meeting and bought himself a five-string banjo with frets and eventually learned to play it.

Later in 1909, he became a member of Will Pepper's White Coons. Three years later, Morley conducted the Palladium Minstrels, composed of 34 banjoists at the London Palladium minstrel show. In 1914, he joined Alec Hurley's The Jesters touring Ireland. During World War I, Morley entertained the troops at Aldershot and Salisbury, as well as abroad in Cologne and Koblenz.

== Later career ==
Morley began to make recordings with the banjo player Olly Oakley for Pathé Records. Out of all records he made, he only made one solo record on the Homochord label, Jovial Huntsman and Donkey Laugh. In August 1932, he made his radio debut as a banjo soloist. In September 1932, he joined Harry S. Pepper, Stanley Holloway, Doris Arnold, Jane Carr, and C. Denier Warren to revive the White Coons Concert Party show of the Edwardian era for BBC Radio. Four months later, he went on the air with the Kentucky Minstrels, produced by Harry S. Pepper.

Morley, who never married, died at the Lambeth Hospital in the East End of London.

== Society activities ==
Joe Morley was

- President of the Aston Banjo Club.
- President of the Lewisham B.M. & G. Club.
- President of the London Banjo Club.
