= The Golden Year (TV play) =

- Written by: Jack Hulbert; Barry Baker
- Starring: Sally Ann Howes; Peter Graves
- Country of origin: United Kingdom

Production
- Producers: Walton Anderson; Jack Hulbert

Original release
- Release: 23 June 1951

The Golden Year is a musical play by Jack Hulbert and Barry Baker written for BBC Television, starring Hulbert with Sally Ann Howes and Peter Graves, with original music by Harry S. Pepper. It was first broadcast on 23 June and 2 July 1951. The musical is set at Hyde Park, London during the Great Exhibition of 1851.

A contribution to the Festival of Britain, the claim was made that the play was the first musical comedy ever produced for television. The BBC Year Book commented that "Jack Hulbert was featured in Festival style". Filmed in black and white, the musical has a length of 104 minutes.

Jack Hulbert, Walton Anderson, Eric Robinson, Eunice Crowther, and the George Mitchell Choir had previously worked together for BBC Television on a production of Cinderella first broadcast on 27 December 1947, and most of them came together for a new Cinderella in 1950 which like The Golden Year starred Sally Ann Howes.

== Crew ==
- Producer: Walton Anderson
- Writer and producer: Jack Hulbert
- Writer: Barry Baker
- Lyrics: Jimmy Dyrenforth
- Original music composed by: Harry S. Pepper
- Special orchestrations: Arthur Wilkinson
- Dance arrangers: Irving Davies, Eunice Crowther
- Orchestra direction: Eric Robinson
- Settings: Richard Greenough

== Cast ==
- Jack Hulbert: John Radlett
- Sally Ann Howes: Susan Halliday
- Peter Graves: David Grenleigh
- Willoughby Gray: Sir Norman Grenleigh
- Daisy Burrell: Lady Grenleigh
- Paddy Stone: Jem Heath
- Vi Stevens: Mrs Robinson
- Eunice Crowther: Jane Radlett
- Irving Davies: Tony Martin
- Victor Platt: Charlie Perkins
- Janice Edgard: Betty Willis
- Patricia Clare: Charm Sister
- Eleanor Fazan: Charm Sister
- The George Mitchell Choir
