= Band Waggon =

BBC comedy radio show, 1938–1940

- Genre: Comedy radio Full-service radio
- Country of origin: United Kingdom
- Language: English
- Home station: BBC National Programme BBC Home Service
- TV adaptations: Living It Up
- Starring: Arthur Askey; Richard "Stinker" Murdoch; Syd Walker; Diana Clare
- Produced by: Gordon Crier; Harry S. Pepper
- Original release: 1938 – 1940

Band Waggon is a comedy radio show broadcast by the BBC from 1938 to 1940. The first series featured Arthur Askey and Richard "Stinker" Murdoch. In the second series, Askey and Murdoch were joined by Syd Walker, and the third series added Diana Clare for two episodes. Band Waggon was co-produced by Gordon Crier and Harry S. Pepper and was the first comedy show to be designed for radio.

Together with Monday Night at Seven, it established the practice of broadcasting a regular comedy and music programme at the same time each week. The show ended in 1940, allowing Askey to pursue a career in film and Murdoch to join the Royal Air Force. A stage show of the same name and starring Askey and Murdoch was toured by Jack Hylton beginning in November 1938. The show, with the addition of Tommy Trinder, was playing at the London Palladium when the Second World War broke out. The following year, another version - with Norman Evans in place of Trinder - played at the Blackpool Opera House. An Audiobook CD, featuring extracts from the Band Waggon radio show along with other comedy recordings by Askey and Murdoch, was issued in 2006.

== Film version ==
A film version of the series was released in 1940; it was directed by Marcel Varnel and again featured the double act of Askey and Murdoch. The plot involves the latter pair using unorthodox methods to get their show onto the BBC, and running into enemy agents at a castle in Sussex. Askey, playing himself in his first major film role, employs his trademark catchphrase "I Thank You" and the songs "Big-Hearted Arthur" and "The Bee". The film also features the music of Jack Hylton, the singing talents of Patricia Kirkwood, dancing girls, and the clowning of Moore Marriott. A television version was made in 1958, starring Askey and Murdoch, titled Living It Up.
