= Monday Night at Eight =

- Other names: Monday Night at Seven (1937–1939)
- Genre: Magazine/Variety
- Running time: 60 minutes
- Country of origin: United Kingdom
- Language: English
- Home station: BBC National Programme; BBC Home Service
- Hosted by: Ronnie Waldman
- Produced by: Harry S. Pepper
- Original release: April 1937 – 29 March 1948

Monday Night at Eight was a weekly BBC radio magazine and variety programme that was broadcast live on the BBC Home Service, with Ronnie Waldman doing the interviews and announcements, produced by Harry S. Pepper.

The programme was launched in April 1937 on the BBC National Programme under the title Monday Night at Seven, running from 7pm to 8pm. In October 1939 it was moved to 8pm and renamed Monday Night at Eight, remaining in this slot until its cancellation in 1948. The change of time was due to longer working hours during World War II, thus enabling more people to listen.

The formats for both programmes were similar. The first part consisted of interviews of all types of people; then there was a musical break, and the final part was a radio detective play. Initially it was Inspector Hornleigh Investigates, but in 1942 a new series called Dr Morelle was introduced. Another feature that was started in Monday Night at Eight was Puzzle Corner, also used in later programmes, and the weekly 'Deliberate Mistake'. Popular comedians Arthur Askey and Richard Murdoch contributed "Chestnut Corner". One weekly comedy sketch was "The Dooms". These were a family of witches and warlocks who had strange adventures at home. When all was quiet at the end, Mrs Drusilla Doom (Hermione Gingold) would ask her husband (Alfred Marks) in a sepulchral voice - "Tea, Edmond?" (pause) "Milluck?" (i.e. milk).

Another regular feature of each show was a record of the life of "Old Ebenezer", a night watchman sitting in front of his brazier in a road where repairs were taking place. Fantastic stories were recounted, after which Ebenezer would give way to his astonishment with his famous catch phrase, "Well I'll be jiggered!". "Old Ebenezer" was voiced by character actor Richard Goolden.

Several actors and singers had their radio debut on Monday Night at Eight. The singer Anne Shelton had her debut in 1940 and Julie Andrews appeared with her mother and stepfather in 1947.

After the change of time, the lyrics of the signature tune at the beginning of the show were:

It's Monday night at eight o'clock, oh can't you hear the chimes?
They're telling you to take an easy chair,
To settle by the fireside, take out your Radio Times,
For Monday Night at Eight is on the air.

At the end of every programme:

Produced by Harry Pepper, and Ronnie Waldman too,
We hope the programme hasn't caused a frown
So goodbye everybody, it's time to say goodnight,
For Monday Night at Eight is closing down.

== See also ==
Another BBC show of a similar nature was In Town Tonight, which was broadcast in the same period on a Saturday night.
