= Shim Sham Club =

Former jazz club in London, England

- Location: Soho, London, United Kingdom
- Type: Jazz and swing club

Construction
- Opened: 1935
- Closed: Unknown

The Shim Sham Club was a short-lived jazz and swing club located at 37 Wardour Street in Soho, London, United Kingdom. Established in March 1935 by the Black American singer Ike Hatch and the Jewish businessman Jack Isow. The club quickly became known as a vibrant and inclusive venue, particularly famous for its diverse clientele that included Black, Jewish and LGBTQ+ patrons. This atmosphere made it a significant part of London's multicultural and artistic community during the 1930s.

== History ==
The Shim Sham Club was named after the "Shim Sham", a popular dance routine originating from Harlem, which underscored its cultural roots in African-American traditions. It hosted performances by notable jazz musicians of the era, contributing significantly to London's jazz scene. Operating as a bottle club to avoid licensing restrictions on drinking and dancing, the Shim Sham was described as "London's miniature Harlem", highlighting its influence and the lively, speakeasy-style atmosphere it provided. It was, says Dave Haslam, "noisy, tough and interracial".

Jazz musicians who appeared at the club included George 'Happy' Blake, Benny Carter, Nat Gonella, Ivor Mairants, Fats Waller and Garland Wilson, who was leader of the resident band by late 1936.

Among those who frequented the club were Edwina Mountbatten, Italian boxer Primo Carnera, journalist and politician Tom Driberg and composer Constant Lambert. Lambert met Laureen Sylvestre there while she was working as a dancer and cigarette girl, and in 1945 became godfather to her daughter, Cleo Sylvestre.

== Cultural impact ==
The Shim Sham Club was more than just a music venue. Along with other black clubs that gained popularity in 1930's Soho - such as the Nest, Smokey Joe's and the Jig's Club - it acted as a social hub, helping to break down racial and social barriers. By attracting a mixed-race audience and allowing for an open and relaxed atmosphere where Black, Jewish and LGBTQ+ patrons could socialise freely, these clubs stood out in an era of racial and social segregation.

This inclusivity also made it a target for police raids due to its unlicensed status and the presence of marginalised groups. On 5 July 1935, the Shim Sham Club was raided and charged with operating as an unlicensed club. Late in 1937 it reopened as the Rainbow Roof, but had reverted back to the original name by April 1938. By 1941 three clubs were operating from 37 Wardour Street: The Palm Beach Bottle Party (basement), the Cosmo (ground floor) and the West End Bridge and Billiards Club (top floor).

== Legacy ==
Although the exact date of the Shim Sham Club's closure is unknown, its legacy in London's cultural history was considerable. The club played a crucial role in establishing Soho as a centre for artistic and cultural diversity, paving the way for the future generations of jazz clubs and music venues in the area, such as Frisco's (off Piccadilly) and Bouillabaisse (in New Compton Street).

== See also ==
- LGBT history in the United Kingdom
- List of jazz venues
