= Kentucky Minstrels (film) =

1934 film directed by John Baxter

- Harry Scott, Eddie Whaley and C. Denier Warren in the film
- Directed by: John Baxter
- Written by: Harry S. Pepper; C. Denier Warren
- Produced by: Julius Hagen
- Cinematography: Sydney Blythe
- Music by: W.L. Trytel
- Production company: Real Art Productions
- Distributed by: Universal Pictures
- Release date: 1934
- Running time: 84 minutes
- Country: United Kingdom
- Language: English

Kentucky Minstrels (U.S. title: Life is Real) is a 1934 British musical film directed by John Baxter. It was made at Twickenham Studios as a quota quickie for release by Universal Pictures. Scott and Whaley, the stars of the film, were an African American comedy duo, and the first black performers to take a leading role in a British film. Written by Harry S. Pepper and C. Denier Warren, the film also features American actress Nina Mae McKinney. The story derived from the BBC radio programme, The Kentucky Minstrels, first broadcast in 1933, which was written and performed by the same team.

== Plot ==
Mott and Bayley are two entertainers who will not accept that the era of the traditional minstrel show is over. Having turned down work on the music-hall stage, they descend into poverty, eventually performing outside pubs just to get by. Throughout their hardship their friendship remains unbreakable and their belief in a minstrel revival never wavers. When theatrical manager Danny Goldman decides to feature a minstrel act in his new musical, the pair bounce back.

== Cast ==
- Harry Scott as Mott/Pussy-Foot
- Eddie Whaley as Bayley/Cuthbert
- C. Denier Warren as Danny Goldman
- April Vivian as Maggie
- Wilson Coleman as Ben
- Madge Brindley as landlady
- Roddy Hughes as Town Clerk
- Norman Greene as Massa Johnson
- Terence Casey
- Edgar Driver
- Jack Gerrard
- Leslie Hatton and his White Coons as themselves
- Nina Mae McKinney
- Harry S. Pepper and his Band as themselves
- Leo Sheffield
- Debroy Somers
- Polly Ward
- Josie Woods as dancer

== Reception ==
The Daily Film Renter wrote: "It is evident John Baxter, the director, has more than a sneaking admiraticn for the minstrel show, for he has handled the subject with something akin to reverence, securing the utmost possible sympathy for the old-time players. ... Scott and Whaley, the coloured artistes, take leading roles, appearing as Mott and Bayley with considerable success, Not only do they give their familiar music-hall performances, but they also act with extreme competence."

Picturegoer wrote: "The idea of this production is to trace the evolution of popular musical entertainment during the past three decades, but it is not wholly successful in its purpose. The story is thin, and the treatment definitely scrappy. What should have been a cavaicade of the show business has become rather a rambling and disconnected series of turns relying mainly on the cross talk of Scott and Whaley for amusement. ... [the] finale is lavishly staged and melodious, but it, too, cannot escape the generally unsatisfactory atmosphere. C. Dernier Warren puts up a good show as Goldman, while Nina Mae McKinney, who has a song number, and Debroy Somers' Band put some pep into the culminating musical ensemble."

Picture Show wrote: "Scott and Whaley give an amusing performance and the White Coons and Debroy Somers prove most entertaining. Pleasant entertainment."

Stephen Bourne, writing in 2008 in The Independent, referred to the film's "brilliant musical finale".
