= It Happened in Soho =

1948 British film by Frank Chisnell

- Frame from the film
- Directed by: Frank Chisnell
- Written by: Terry Stanford
- Starring: Richard Murdoch; Henry Oscar
- Cinematography: Ronnie Pilgrim
- Production company: Frank Chisnell Productions
- Release date: 1948
- Running time: 50 minutes
- Country: United Kingdom
- Language: English

It Happened in Soho is a 1948 British black and white low-budget B film directed by Frank Chisnell and starring Richard Murdoch and Henry Oscar. A reporter trails a multiple killer.

== Plot ==
A girl is murdered in Soho, and reporter Bill Scott is on the trail of the killer. Bill meets country girl Susan Marsh, and shows her Soho by night, taking her to a café and introducing her to Julie, and artist Paul Sayers. Julie offers Susan a place to stay. Later Julie is found murdered, and near her body is Bill's lucky charm. Susan assumes Bill is the killer, but it is in fact Paul, who is about to kill Susan when Inspector Carp arrives just in time. Bill and Susan marry.

== Cast ==
- Richard Murdoch as Bill Scott
- Henry Oscar as Inspector Carp
- Paul Demel as Angelo
- John Bailey as Paul Sayers
- Patricia Raine as Susan Marsh
- Eunice Gayson as Julie
- Rose Howlett as Lulu
- Dennis Harkin as Johnnie (as Denis Harkin)
- Alexander Kardan as the communist (as Alexander Kardin)
- Morris Sweden as the cockney

== Critical reception ==
In contemporary reviews Kine Weekly said "Its principal characters are a light-hearted and light-headed crime reporter, a girl just up from the country, a wise old 'cop' and an elusive strangler, but their movements are so clumsy that few laughs and less thrills spring from the exchanges. ... The idea of staging a thriller in Soho is good, but the authentic settings are wasted on a transparent 'who dunnit' story,"; Monthly Film Bulletin wrote "Despite attempts to create atmosphere, this is an amateurish production which makes it difficult to believe that the events shown could have happened anywhere. Richard Murdoch struggles unsuccessfully with the stilted dialogue and gets little support worth mentioning from the rest of the cast."

In British Sound Films: The Studio Years 1928–1959 David Quinlan rated the film as "poor", writing: "Poor dialogue, amateurish treatment: players struggle to little avail."

Chibnall and McFarlane in The British 'B' Film wrote that the film was: "burdened by a leaden and clichéd script."
