= Dick Pepper =

Dick Leaver Pepper (24 June 1889 – 15 October 1962) was a musician, actor, and writer for the BBC.

== Life ==
Born in Putney, Pepper was the son of Will C. Pepper, founder of a long-running concert party called the White Coons, and the older brother of Harry S. Pepper. His middle name of Leaver came from his mother, whose name was Annie Leaver before her marriage.

Brought up by his father as an entertainer, Pepper picked up the banjo from those around him in the White Coons, and he also trained as a cinematograph operator. In the 1930s, he formed the "Kentucky Banjo Team" with Joe Morley and Tarrant Bailey, for a BBC Home Service radio programme called The Kentucky Minstrels. In April 1934, he contributed an article to Radio Times on "Minstrels and Banjo-playing". He went on to become a writer for the BBC.

In 1925, Pepper married Eva C. Fazan. He died at Ashford Hospital, Stanwell, on 15 October 1962, aged 73, leaving an estate worth £9,212. At the time of his death he was living at Little Prouton, 93 Chertsey Lane, Staines, Middlesex. His widow was still living there when she died in 1968.
