= Irving Davies =

Welsh dancer and choreographer

Irving Davies (26 April 1926 – 14 October 2002) was a Welsh dancer and choreographer.

Born in Barry, Vale of Glamorgan, Wales, Davies's screen work included Value for Money (1955), Kiss Me Kate (1964) and Aladdin (1960).

An early television role was in The Golden Year (1951), for which he was also choreographer, jointly with Eunice Crowther. He had a role in the film Invitation to the Dance (1956), in which he danced with Diana Adams.

In 1960 a London show called The Dancing Heiress at the Lyric Theatre, Hammersmith, gave Davies one of his few leading roles, opposite Jill Ireland, duetting with Lally Bowers in the most memorable number, 'Life is Peaches and Cream'.

Sheila Hancock recalled appearing as a dancer in Peter Cook's revue One over the Eight (1961), when she was egged on by Irving Davies's exhortation as dance captain, "Eyes, teeth, and tits, darlings - and sparkle, sparkle, sparkle."

In a review in 1964, Theatre World said of Davies that he was "one of the most inventive choreographers working in the modern dance field".

In 1980, Davies choreographed the show The Biograph Girl, a musical directed by Victor Spinetti which premiered at the Phoenix Theatre on 19 November 1980 and had a run of 57 performances, starring Sheila White as Mary Pickford and Bruce Barry as D. W. Griffith. In 1983 he was choreographer for the musical Jean Seberg.

In 2002, Davies was nominated for the Laurence Olivier Award for Best Theatre Choreographer for his work on The Play What I Wrote. He died in London later that year, aged 76. An obituary in The Times noted that he had worked with Orson Welles, Liberace, Noël Coward, Anita Harris, Twiggy, and Cilla Black, and said "His creative flair saw him make great contributions to innovative and dynamic dance styles, winning numerous awards, including Best Choreography and Best Staging in the Lanson Theatre Awards. An inspiration to those who worked with him, Davies had the imagination and ability to turn ideas into reality."
