= 8 Man =

Franchise about superhero of the same name

- Official 2011 reprint cover of the manga's first volume from Japan

8(エイト)マン (Eitoman)
- Manga
- Written by: Kazumasa Hirai
- Illustrated by: Jiro Kuwata
- Published by: Kodansha
- Magazine: Weekly Shōnen Magazine
- Original run: May 1963 – April 1966
- Volumes: 5
- Anime television series

Eightman
- Directed by: Haruyuki Kawajima
- Music by: Tetsuaki Hagiwara
- Studio: TCJ
- Original network: TBS
- English network: AU: Nine Network
- Original run: 7 November 1963 – 31 December 1964
- Episodes: 56
Further information
Live-action television film
8 Man Has Returned
Directed by	Akinori Kikuchi
Written by	Masakazu Shirai
Original network	Fuji TV
Released	31 August 1987
Live-action film
8 Man: For All Lonely Nights
Directed by	Yasuhiro Horiuchi
Produced by	Isao Urushidani
Written by	Mitsuyuki Miyazaki; Junko Suzuki
Music by	Carole King
Released	1992
Original video animation
8 Man After
Directed by	Yoriyasu Kogawa
Produced by	Koji Honda; Norihisa Abe; Shinji Komori
Studio	J.C.Staff
Licensed by	NA: Discotek Media
Released	21 August 1993 – 22 November 1993
Runtime	25–30 minutes (each)
Episodes	4
Manga
8 Man After
Written by	Masahiro Suematsu
Published by	Kodansha
Magazine	Weekly Shōnen Magazine
Original run	1994 – 1995
Volumes	1
Manga
8 Man Infinity
Written by	Kyoichi Nanatsuki
Illustrated by	Takayuki Takashi
Published by	Kodansha
English publisher	NA: Star Fruit Books
Magazine	Magazine Z
Original run	2005 – 2007
Volumes	6

8 Man (8(エイト)マン, Eitoman), Eightman (エイトマン), or 8th Man (1960s anime English dub) is a manga and superhero anime created in 1963 by science-fiction writer Kazumasa Hirai and manga artist Jiro Kuwata. 8 Man is considered Japan's earliest cyborg superhero, predating Kamen Rider.

The manga was published in Weekly Shōnen Magazine and ran from 1963 to 1966. The anime series was produced by TCJ (nowadays Eiken). It was broadcast on Tokyo Broadcasting System and ran from 17 November 1963, to 31 December 1964, with a total of 56 episodes, as well as a special "farewell" episode, "Goodbye, Eightman".

== Plot ==
Detective Hachiro Azuma is murdered by a gang criminals and his body is retrieved by Chief Tanaka (in the manga), or Dr. Tani (in the anime). In Tani's laboratory, he transfers Azuma's mind into an android body. Azuma is reborn as the armour-skinned android 8 Man, and is able to dash at impossible speeds as well as shape-shift into other people. He typically takes on the form of his former body, and keeps the fact that he is a robot secret from everyone, even his secretary Sachiko and his assistant Ichiro. To rejuvenate his powers, he smokes "power" cigarettes that he carries in a case on his belt.

The character's origin varies between the original manga, the TV series, and the live-action movie. In the 1992 movie, 8 Man's name before being murdered was "Detective Yokoda", and he is given the name "Detective Azuma" to cover up his death and revival. In the manga, Detective Azuma is trapped in a warehouse and gunned down, while the TV series has him killed when he is run over by a car. The manga has several origins for the name "8 Man". The body was given the designation "008" by the American military, or there being seven police precincts in Tokyo, with 8 Man treated as a detective an unofficial eighth precinct.

The Japanese manga was presented as serial novella stories along with a set of one-shot stories. Many of these stories were edited down and adapted for the TV series. The novella stories were originally printed every week in Shukuu Shōnen Magazine in 16-page increments that consisted of 15 story pages and one title page. Ten additional one-shot stories were presented in seasonal and holiday specials of Shuukuu Shōnen Magazine. These stories were generally between 30 and 40 pages in length.

In the North American version of the 1960s anime series, the resurrected detective is known as "Tobor", the word "robot" spelled backwards. Dr. Tani is referred to as "Professor Genius" and the sobriquet of Eightman is slightly changed to "8th Man", the name explained as he is the 8th attempt to be a super-robot. The story content was directed toward a wider audience of both young and adult viewers. As such, much of the violence was toned down for Western audiences.

== Media ==
=== Original manga ===
==== Novella stories ====
- Gehlen, the Mystery Man (怪人ゲーレン, Kaijin Gēren)
- Satan's Brothers (サタンの兄弟, Satan no Kyōdai)
- Strange Powered Robot 007 (怪力ロボット007, Kairiki Robotto 007)
- The Laser Beam Gun (光線兵器レーザー, Kōsen Heiki Rēzā)
- Cyber, the Superhuman (超人サイバー, Chōjin Saibā)
- The Human Missile (人間ミサイル, Ningen Misairu)
- Murderous Robot 005 (殺人ロボット005, Satsujin Robotto 005)
- Esper, the Witch (魔女エスパー, Majo Esupā)
- Superhuman Mutant (超人類ミュータント, Chōjinrui Myūtanto)
- The Demon Kozuma (魔人コズマ, Majin Kozuma)

The strip's artist Jiro Kuwata was imprisoned for possession of a handgun before the final 16-page serial of "The Demon Kozuma" was completed. The final serial was drawn by Takaharu Kusunoki for the magazine version. Jiro Kuwata later redrew the final pages of the story himself by request of Kazumasa Hirai and Rim Publishing, so that they could publish a complete version of the final story. The publishers were not able to use Kusunoki's artwork, so the story was omitted or left incomplete in previous official releases.

==== Short episode stories ====
- The Condemned Criminal Tarantula (死刑囚タランチュラ)
- Duel (決闘)
- Shadow Boxer (シャドウ・ボクサー)
- Vengeful Demon Ghost (復讐鬼ゴースト)
- The Super Vibration Gun (超振動砲)
- Mad Machine (マッド・マシン)
- Cyborg Number PV1 (サイボーグPV1号)
- The Assassin Elijah (殺し屋イライジャ)
- Burning Water (燃える水)
- Ghost Highway (幽霊ハイウェイ)
- Solar Satellite "Thunder" (unreleased story) (太陽衛星サンダー (単行本未収録))

This was intended as a lead-in to a series of 23 manga stories adapted from the TV series.

=== 1960s anime series ===
==== Episode list (original Japanese version) ====
1. エイトマン登場 – Eightman Makes His Appearance
2. 殺し屋ゲーレン – Gehlen, the Hitman
3. サタンの兄弟 – Brother of Satan
4. 死刑台B3 – The B3 Gallows
5. 暗黒カプセル – The Darkness Capsule
6. 黄金ギャング – The Gold Gang
7. 消音ジェット機 – The Noiseless Jets
8. 超小型ミサイル – The Ultra Micro Missile
9. 光線銃レーザー – The Laser Ray Gun
10. ロボット007 – Robot No. 007
11. まぼろしの暗殺者 – The Phantom Assassin
12. 海底のウラン – The Undersea Uranium
13. 人間パンチカード – Human Punch Card
14. スーパーパイロット – Super Pilot
15. 黒い幽霊 – The Black Ghost
16. 怪盗黄金虫 – Goldbeetle, the Mysterious Thief
17. 超音波ドクター – The Ultrasonic Wave Doctor
18. 台風男爵 – The Typhoon Baron
19. ゲーレンの逆襲 – Gehlen's Counterattack
20. スパイ指令100号 – Spy Directive No. 100
21. ロボットタイガー – The Robot Tiger
22. ゼロへの挑戦 – Challenge to Zero
23. ナポレオン13世 – Napoleon the 13th
24. サラマンダー作戦 – Operation: Salamander
25. 超人サイバー – Cyber, the Superhuman
26. 地球ゼロアワー – Zero Hour: Earth
27. 大怪物イーラ – Eeler, the Giant Monster
28. バクテリア作戦 – Operation: Bacteria
29. 人間ミサイル – The Human Missile
30. サイボーグ人間C1号 – Cyborg No. C1
31. 幽霊ハイウェイ – Ghost Highway
32. 太陽衛星サンダー – The Solar Satellite Thunder
33. 人工生命ヴァルカン – The Artificial Lifeform – Valcoun
34. 決闘 – Duel
35. 冷凍光線 – The Freezing Ray
36. バイラス13号 – Byrus No. 13
37. 悪夢の7日間 – The 7 Day Nightmare
38. 怪人ゴースト – The Mysterious Ghost
39. まぼろしを作る少年 – The Boy Who Made a Phantom
40. 透明ロボット・ジュピター – Jupiter, the Invisible Robot
41. エイトマン暗殺指令 – Order: Assassinate Eightman
42. 女王蜂モンスター – The Queen Bee Monster
43. 魔女エスパー – Esper, the Witch
44. 世界電撃プラン – The World Blitz Plan
45. 死刑囚タランチュラ – Tarantula, the Condemned Criminal
46. 空飛ぶ魔人 – The Flying Devil
47. バブル・ボール作戦 – Operation: Bubble Ball
48. 火星人SAW – SAW, the Martian
49. 30億人の人質 – 3 Billion Hostages
50. 怪像ジャイアント – Giant, the Mysterious Statue
51. 狙われた地球 – Target Earth
52. 人喰魚ピラニア – The Man-Eating Piranha
53. ムタールの反乱 – Mutar's Rebellion
54. シャークの掟 – Law of the Shark
55. 超人類ミュータント(前編) – Superhuman Mutant (Part One)
56. 超人類ミュータント(後編) – Superhuman Mutant (Part Two)
- "Goodbye, Eightman" – a special look back at the TV series.

==== The U.S. syndicated version ====
In 1965, Eightman was brought to the U.S. as 8th Man (or "Fantastic 8th Man" in trade ads and TV guide listings), with ABC Films as its syndicated distributor. The original intro was replaced by a new intro animated by Hal Seeger Productions. Fifty-two of the original 56 episodes were dubbed into English.

The characters were renamed as follows:

- Detective Hachiro Azuma/Eightman – Detective Tobor/8th Man
- Dr. Tani – Professor Genius
- Chief Tanaka – Chief Fumblethumbs
- Sachiko Seki – Jenny Heartsweet
- Ichiro – Skip Pepper

===== Theme song =====
There is a prehistoric monster who came from outer space.

===== Release =====
Mental Brain Media released the first volume containing a few select episodes on 25 February 2019, under The Best of Tobor the 8th Man.

== Reception ==
8 Man was ranked ninth in the Mania Entertainment's '10 Most Iconic Anime Heroes'. The author of the ranking, Thomas Zoth, commented, "Before Cyborg 009, The Six Million Dollar Man, and RoboCop, there was 8 Man: The first cyborg manga and anime hero. Building on Astro Boy, 8 Man helped to shape the trajectory of robot and cyborg heroes for the next decade." (Technically 8 Man was predated by DC Comics' "Robotman", who first appeared in "Star Spangled Comics" #7 (April 1942).)

== Legacy ==
The 8 Man franchise was revived in the early 1990s with a live-action film, video game, and OVA series.

=== Video game ===
In 1991, SNK released a video game edition of Eight Man for the Neo Geo arcade and home video game system (both versions are identical), where the player took the role of 8 Man and his Robo-comrade 9 Man in a fight against an invading evil robot army. The game was released internationally. While the game stayed true to the concept of a crime-fighting super-robot, it was widely criticized for being tedious and relying too much on the gimmick of its speed-running effect.

In 2009, he appeared in the crossover Shonen Sunday & Shonen Magazine White Comic for the Nintendo DS.

=== Live action movie ===
In 1992, a live-action film version of 8 Man was produced in Japan. Titled 8 Man: For All Lonely Nights (8マン・すべての寂しい夜のために, Eitoman: Subete no Sabishī Yoru no Tame ni), released as simply 8 Man in some English and Spanish-speaking areas, it was directed by Yasuhiro Horiuchi and starred Kai Shishido as the title character and Toshihide Wakamatsu as Detective Yokoda. Distributed in the United States by Fox Lorber video simply as 8 Man, the movie was widely panned for its choppy editing, mediocre direction, and low-budget feel. Many modern American viewers, unfamiliar with the older animated series, felt the movie was an inferior version of RoboCop, although the latter was a much more recent franchise.

=== 8 Man After ===
In 1993, the mantle of 8 Man was taken up by Hazama Itsuru in the OVA series 8 Man After (エイトマン AFTER, Eitoman AFTER). Animation was done by J.C. Staff with a total of four episodes.

Existing in a world far more corrupt than that of his predecessor, the new 8 Man had no qualms about being extremely violent towards the cybernetic criminals who had murdered him previously. It was licensed by Streamline Pictures where it went out of print until being released on DVD by Image Entertainment in 2001. It has since been released by Discotek Media in 2016 with Japanese audio, featuring English subtitles for the first time.

It's marketed for retail outside Japan by Enoki Films.

=== 8 Man Infinity ===
A manga sequel called 8 Man Infinity (8マンインフィニティ Eitoman Infiniti) is being authored by Kyoichi Nanatsuki under Kodansha with six volumes published from 2005 to 2007. It was formerly serialized under Kodansha's Magazine Z.

On 25 July 2024, Star Fruit Books reported that the manga is licensed for an English release.

=== 8 Man vs. Cyborg 009 ===
A crossover between 8 Man and Cyborg 009 by Kyoichi Nanatsuki (script) and Masato Hayate (art), began serialization in Champion Red on 18 July 2020.
