= Paul Demel =

Czech actor (1903–1951)

Demel in the BBC's Television is Here Again (1946)

Paul Demel (4 May 1903 – 31 August 1951) was a Czech actor.

== Life and career ==
Demel was born in Brno, in Moravia, Austria-Hungary. He is most notable for his cameo appearances in films, particularly the British Ealing comedies Hue and Cry (1947), Passport to Pimlico (1949), The Lavender Hill Mob (1951) and His Excellency (1952). His other film appearances include English Without Tears (1944) for Two Cities Films. His stage work included West End roles in The Doctor's Dilemma at the Haymarket with Vivien Leigh in 1942, and Madame Louise at the Garrick in 1945. He died in Munich.

== Filmography ==
Year	Title	Role	Notes
1934	Zlatá Kateřina		
1934	Pokušení paní Antonie		
1934	Matka Kráčmerka	Karel Demel	
1944	It Happened One Sunday	Cassio	
1944	English Without Tears	M. Saladoff	
1945	The Man from Morocco	August	
1946	Late at Night	The Spider	
1947	Hue and Cry	Jago	
1948	It Happened in Soho	Angelo the Cafe Proprietor	
1949	Passport to Pimlico	Central European	
1950	State Secret	Barber	
1950	The Miniver Story	José Antonio Campos	Uncredited
1951	The Lavender Hill Mob	Customs Official	
1951	Wild West in Upper Bavaria	Regisseur Ruck-Zuck-Film	
1952	Hanna Amon		Uncredited
1952	His Excellency	The Chef	(final film role)
