= Charles Carpendale =

Royal Navy officer

Vice-Admiral Sir Charles Carpendale CB
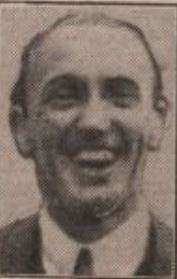
- Charles Douglas Carpendale (1923)
- Born: 18 October 1874
- Died: 21 March 1968 (aged 93)
- Military career
- Allegiance: United Kingdom
- Branch: Royal Navy
- Rank: Vice-Admiral
- Commands: HMS Good Hope; HMS Shannon; HMS Donegal; HMS Benbow
- Conflicts: First World War; Greco-Turkish War (1919–22)
- Awards: Commander of the Order of the Bath
- Other work: Controller of the BBC; President of the International Broadcasting Union

Vice-Admiral Sir Charles Douglas Carpendale, CB (18 October 1874 – 21 March 1968) was a Royal Navy officer who saw active service in the First World War and later served as Controller of the British Broadcasting Corporation.

== Naval career ==
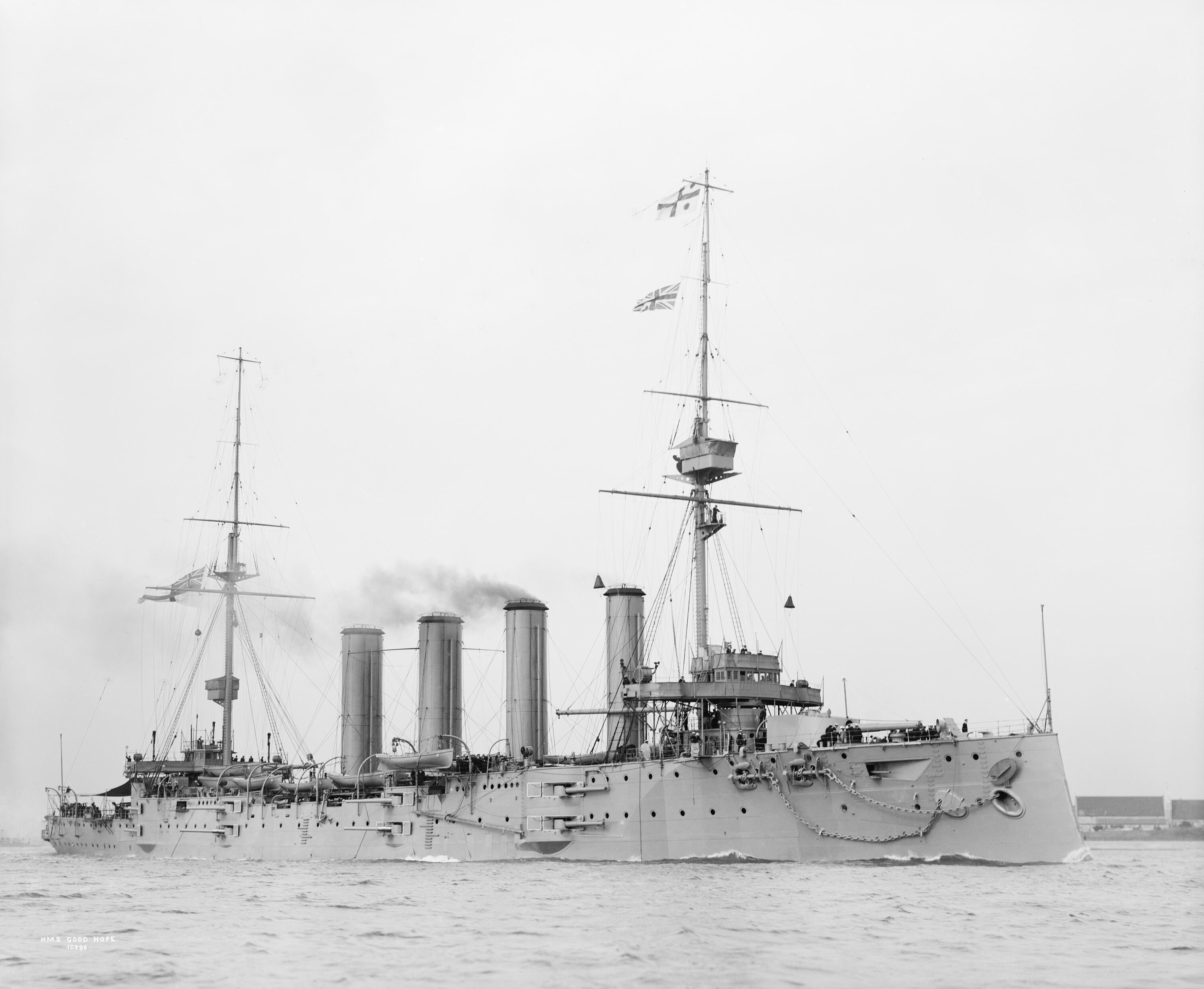
HMS Good Hope, one of Carpendale's commands

Born at Brixworth, Northamptonshire, in 1874, Carpendale came of a long line of clergymen. He was the son of the Rev. William Henry Carpendale, by his marriage to Julia Ellen, a daughter of Henry Hall Joy, of Hartham Park, Wiltshire; the grandson of the Rev. William Carpendale, Rector of Silton, Dorset; and the great-grandson of the Rev. Thomas Carpendale, of Armagh.

He joined HMS Britannia, a Cadet Training Ship, at Dartmouth, in 1887. He was commissioned as a Lieutenant in 1894, promoted to Commander in 1904, and to Captain in 1910. In February 1911, he was given command of HMS Good Hope and went on to command the armoured cruiser Shannon (1912 to 1914) and then another cruiser, Donegal, in the first year of the First World War (1914 to 1915). Donegal had just been refitted and was assigned to the 5th Cruiser Squadron at Sierra Leone for convoy protection duties. In January 1915 she was transferred to the 6th Cruiser Squadron of the Grand Fleet.

After that until 1917 Carpendale was flag captain to Admiral Sir Lewis Bayly at Queenstown until taking command of the armoured cruiser Achilles in June 1917. In March 1918 he was put in charge of Auxiliary Patrol Area XVII as a Commodore.

Following the First World War, Carpendale commanded HMS Benbow from 1919 to 1921, during which time he commanded a landing party of Royal Marines from Benbow and Marlborough at the time of the Occupation of Constantinople during the Greco-Turkish War. On 6 July 1921, while commanding Benbow, he was promoted to Rear-Admiral. He retired from the Royal Navy (at his own request) on 1 August 1923 and joined the Retired List. On 25 October 1926, he was promoted to Vice-Admiral.

In 1940, as the British war effort in the Second World War was intensified, Carpendale agreed to serve as the Ministry of Information's Liaison Officer at the Air Ministry and was brought back from retirement.

== BBC and International Broadcasting Union ==
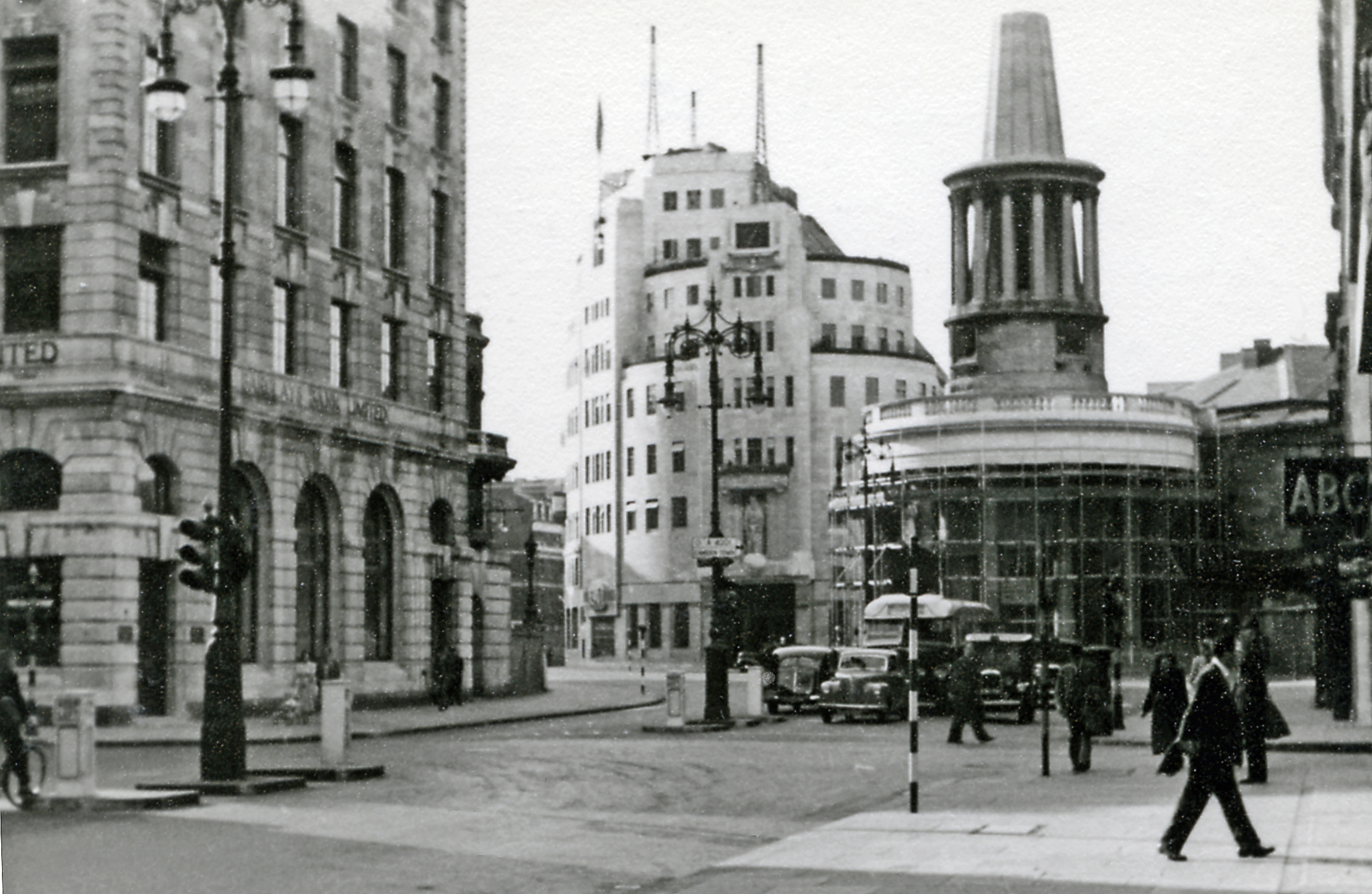
Broadcasting House (centre), home of the BBC, built in 1932

In June 1923, John Reith, the first General Manager of the BBC, was under pressure and looking for a Deputy, and F. J. Brown (Assistant Secretary of the General Post Office) suggested Carpendale for the job. Reith interviewed him at length on 14 June, with Carpendale not at first understanding that Reith was looking for a second-in-command. Reith liked Carpendale, they met again on 5 July, the post was offered and accepted, and Carpendale started work on 13 July with the title of Assistant General Manager. He was later given the title of Controller of the British Broadcasting Corporation. He retired in 1938.

On 3 April 1925, at Geneva, Carpendale became President of the First General Assembly of the International Broadcasting Union (Union Internationale de Radio-Diffusion), remaining in office until 1932.

Lionel Fielden has described Carpendale as "a handsome blue-eyed man with a barking manner". An obituary in The Times referred to his "famous quarter-deck manner... belied as often as not by an ultimate twinkle in his eye" while he was at the BBC. During the General Strike of 1926, he made himself useful in the studios. Maurice Gorham has told the anecdote of Carpendale interviewing the musician Harry S. Pepper for a job at the BBC. He asked Pepper "How old are you?" and got the reply "Forty-four, how old are you?"

== Private life ==
In 1907 Carpendale married Christina Henrietta Strange, at Winchester, the daughter of J. S. Strange, lord of the manor of Epsom. They had one son, Richard Douglas Strange Carpendale (1908—1975).

From 1946 to 1948, Carpendale worked as a volunteer in the library of the Royal College of Surgeons, organising and re-binding books.

== Honours ==
- Companion of the Order of the Bath, 1918 Birthday Honours
- Knight bachelor, 1932 Birthday Honours, knighted by HM the King, 22 June 1932
