= Eunice Crowther =

British singer (1916–1986)

- Born: Eunice Beryl Cock; 21 July 1916; Shanghai International Settlement, China
- Died: 13 October 1986 (aged 70); France
- Occupations: Musical theatre performer and choreographer
- Years active: 1935—1954
- Spouse: John A. Norman (m. 1966)

Eunice Crowther (21 July 1916 – 13 October 1986) was a British singer, dancer, and choreographer, who in the early part of her career worked on stage, before moving on to television work for the BBC in the late 1940s. In the 1950s she became a dance director.

== Life ==
Born in the Shanghai International Settlement, China, as Eunice Beryl Cock, she came to England as a child after the Great War of 1914–1918 and was educated at Bournemouth High School. From the age of eighteen, between 1935 and 1936, Crowther originated the part of Dora in the first stage production of This'll Make You Whistle, a musical comedy by Guy Bolton, Al Goodhart, and Maurice Sigler. This was staged at Southsea in December 1935, before a long run in London, arriving at the Streatham Hill Theatre in January 1936, then moving on to the Palace Theatre and finally to Daly's in London's West End. In June 1936 she sailed from London to Las Palmas in the Canary Islands. In October 1936, she was back in England and joined a show called Folks d'Apache, and in May 1939 was working at Finchley in a production of Under Your Hat.

During the Second World War, Crowther was in the chorus line of Jack Hulbert's revue Hulbert Follies, with Mary Barton, Vivien Tandy, Betty Martin, and Beryl Mason, and in July 1940 they were pictured in The Bystander "gallivanting in a film studio garden". In January 1941 a newspaper reported that Crowther was both singer and dancer and led the chorus.

In November 1943, Eunice Crowther was pictured in The Sketch with Sabrina Gordon and Peggy Watson as one of three chorus girls at the Palace Theatre who also played the xylophone. In December 1945, she was in the cast of a show called Here Come the Boys by Manning Sherwin and Harold Purcell at the Lyceum Theatre, Edinburgh. This arrived at the Saville Theatre, Shaftesbury Avenue, in May 1946, with the Tatler noting that "Miss Eunice Crowther and Miss Natasha Sokolova have some graceful dancing numbers", and The Stage commenting approvingly on Crowther's opening number in the show, "The Backless Rabbit", with the Rhythm Brothers.

Crowther first came to national attention in Britain as a singer and dancer in Jack Hulbert's Hulbert Follies of 1948, a BBC Television show in six episodes. In a two-hour BBC Christmas production of Cinderella in 1950, she played Dandini and was also the show's choreographer. She went on to appear in films and other television work, including The Golden Year (1951), in which she was also choreographer, jointly with Irving Davies, and launched a new career as a dance director. She worked with Hulbert again in 1953 to arrange the dances for Over the Moon, a revue starring Cicely Courtneidge at the Casino.

In 1966, under her real name of Eunice B. Cock, Crowther married John A. Norman at Kensington. She died in France in 1986.
