= HMS Donegal (1902) =

Cruiser of the Royal Navy

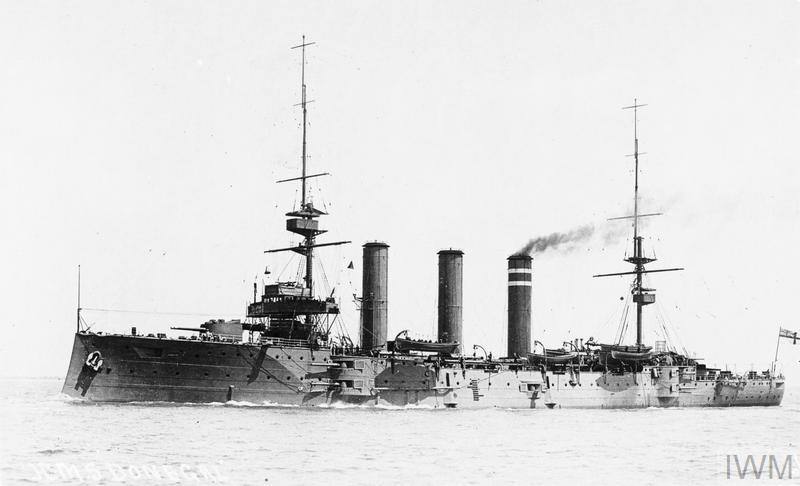
- Armoured cruiser HMS Donegal

History

United Kingdom
- Name: Donegal
- Namesake: County Donegal
- Builder: Fairfield Shipbuilding & Engineering, Govan
- Laid down: 14 February 1901
- Launched: 4 September 1902
- Christened: Mary Hamilton, Duchess of Abercorn
- Completed: 5 November 1903
- Decommissioned: May 1918
- Fate: Sold for scrap, 1 July 1920

General characteristics
- Displacement: 9,800 long tons (10,000 t) (normal)
- Length: 463 ft 6 in (141.3 m) (o/a)
- Beam: 66 ft (20.1 m)
- Draught: 25 ft (7.6 m)
- Installed power: 31 water-tube boilers; 22,000 ihp (16,000 kW)
- Propulsion: 2 × shafts; 2 × triple-expansion steam engines
- Speed: 23 knots (43 km/h; 26 mph)
- Complement: 678
- Armament: 2 × twin, 10 × single 6 in (152 mm) guns; 10 × single 12-pdr (3 in (76 mm)) guns; 3 × single 3-pdr (1.9 in (47 mm)) guns; 2 × 18 in (450 mm) torpedo tubes
- Armour: Belt: 2–4 in (51–102 mm); Decks: 0.75–2 in (19–51 mm); Barbettes: 4 in (102 mm); Turrets: 4 in (102 mm); Conning tower: 10 in (254 mm)

HMS Donegal was one of 10 Monmouth-class armoured cruisers built for the Royal Navy in the first decade of the 20th century. She was initially assigned to the 1st Cruiser Squadron upon completion in 1903 and ran aground en route to the China Station in 1906. She was briefly placed in reserve after repairs before she was assigned to the Home Fleet in 1907. She joined the 4th Cruiser Squadron on the North America and West Indies Station in 1909 before returning home for an assignment with the Training Squadron in 1912. Donegal was reduced to reserve before World War I began in August 1914 as part of the Third Fleet

Refitting at the beginning of the war, she was then assigned to Sierra Leone for convoy protection duties as part of the 5th Cruiser Squadron. She was transferred to several different cruiser squadrons of the Grand Fleet in 1915 where she escorted convoys to Arkhangelsk, Russia. In mid-1916 she was assigned to convoy escort duties in the Atlantic. Donegal rejoined the 4th Cruiser Squadron on North America and West Indies Station in 1917 and continued with convoy duties until the end of the war. Donegal was sold for scrap in 1920.

== Design and description ==
The Monmouths were intended to protect British merchant shipping from fast cruisers like the French Guichen, Châteaurenault or the Dupleix class. The ships were designed to displace 9,800 long tons (10,000 t). They had an overall length of 463 feet 6 inches (141.3 m), a beam of 66 feet (20.1 m) and a deep draught of 25 feet (7.6 m). They were powered by two 4-cylinder triple-expansion steam engines, each driving one shaft using steam provided by 31 Belleville boilers. The engines produced a total of 22,000 indicated horsepower (16,000 kW) which was designed to give the ships a maximum speed of 23 knots (43 km/h; 26 mph). The ship carried a maximum of 1,600 long tons (1,600 t) of coal and her complement consisted of 678 officers and ratings.

The Monmouth-class ships' main armament consisted of fourteen breech-loading (BL) 6-inch (152 mm) Mk VII guns. Four of these guns were mounted in two twin-gun turrets, one each fore and aft of the superstructure, and the others were positioned in casemates amidships. Six of these were mounted on the main deck and were only usable in calm weather. Ten quick-firing (QF) 12-pounder (3-inch (76 mm)) 12-cwt guns (Note: "Cwt" is the abbreviation for hundredweight, 12 cwt referring to the weight of the gun.) were fitted for defence against torpedo boats. Donegal also carried three 3-pounder 1.9 in (47 mm) Hotchkiss guns and two submerged 18-inch (450 mm) torpedo tubes.

Beginning in 1915, the main deck six-inch guns of the Monmouth-class ships were moved to the upper deck and given gun shields. Their casemates were plated over to improve seakeeping. The twelve-pounder guns displaced by the transfer were repositioned elsewhere. At some point in the war, a pair of three-pounder anti-aircraft guns were installed on the upper deck.

The ship's waterline armour belt was four inches (102 mm) thick amidships and two-inch (51 mm) forward. The armour of the gun turrets, their barbettes and the casemates was four inches thick. The protective deck armour ranged in thickness from 0.75–2 inches (19–51 mm) and the conning tower was protected by ten inches (254 mm) of armour.

== Construction and service ==
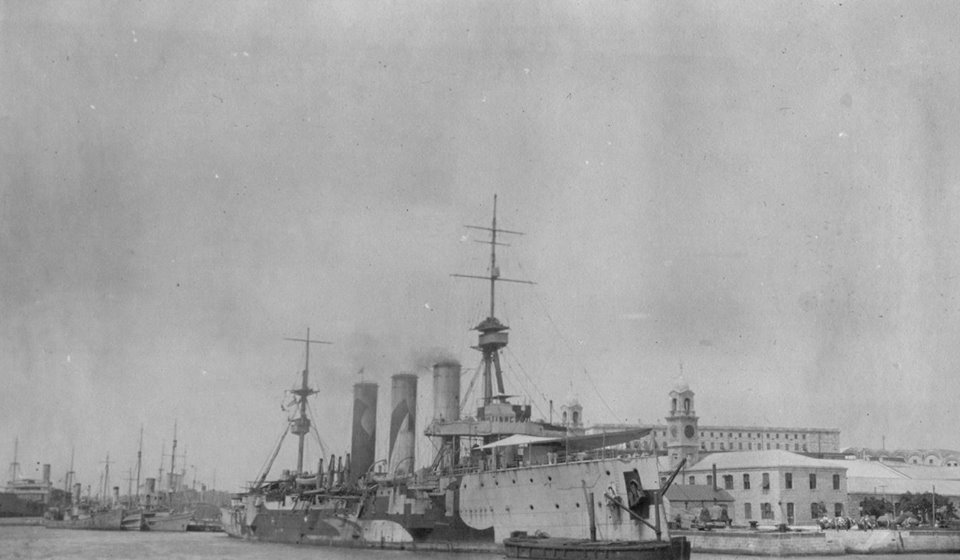
HMS Donegal at the Royal Naval Dockyard in the Imperial fortress colony of Bermuda circa 1918.jpg

Donegal, named to commemorate County Donegal, was laid down by Fairfield Shipbuilding & Engineering at their Govan shipyard on 14 February 1901 and launched on 4 September 1902, when she was named by the Duchess of Abercorn, wife of the Lord-Lieutenant of County Donegal (James Hamilton, 2nd Duke of Abercorn). She was completed on 5 November 1903 and was initially assigned to the 1st Cruiser Squadron of the Channel Fleet. Whilst en route to the China Station, she ran aground at Suez, Egypt on 2 March 1906 and had to return to Chatham Dockyard for repairs. The ship was briefly placed in reserve before she was assigned to the Home Fleet in 1907. Donegal was transferred to the 4th Cruiser Squadron on the North America and West Indies Station in 1909 and collided with the merchant ship SS Malaga at Gibraltar on 8 December. She returned home in 1912 for service with the Training Squadron of Home Fleet and sank the derelict merchantman SS Volturno with gunfire in October 1913. The ship was assigned to the reserve Third Fleet before the beginning of World War I in August 1914.

Refitting when the war began, Donegal was assigned to the 5th Cruiser Squadron at Sierra Leone for convoy protection duties when her refit was completed. She was transferred to the 6th Cruiser Squadron of the Grand Fleet in January 1915 and then to the 7th Cruiser Squadron in November to escort convoys to Arkhangelsk. In March she was reassigned to the 2nd Cruiser Squadron until she was transferred to the 9th Cruiser Squadron in the mid-Atlantic for convoy escort. Donegal rejoined the 4th Cruiser Squadron on North America and West Indies Station in 1917 and continued with convoy duties until the end of the war. She was sold for scrap on 1 July 1920.

== Notable commanding officers ==
- Charles Douglas Carpendale, 1914-1915

== Bibliography ==
- Corbett, Julian (1997) [1938]. Naval Operations to the Battle of the Falklands. History of the Great War: Based on Official Documents. Vol. I (2nd ed.). London and Nashville, Tennessee: Imperial War Museum and Battery Press. ISBN 0-89839-256-X.
- Friedman, Norman (2012). British Cruisers of the Victorian Era. Barnsley, UK: Seaforth. ISBN 978-1-59114-068-9.
- Friedman, Norman (2011). Naval Weapons of World War One: Guns, Torpedoes, Mines and ASW Weapons of All Nations; An Illustrated Directory. Barnsley, UK: Seaforth Publishing. ISBN 978-1-84832-100-7.
- Massie, Robert K. (2003). Castles of Steel: Britain, Germany, and the Winning of the Great War at Sea. New York: Random House. ISBN 0-679-45671-6.
- McBride, Keith (1988). "The First County Class Cruisers of the Royal Navy, Part I: The Monmouths". Warship. 46 (April). London: Conway Maritime Press: 19–26. ISSN 0142-6222.
- Preston, Antony (1985). "Great Britain and Empire Forces". In Gray, Randal (ed.). Conway's All the World's Fighting Ships 1906–1921. Annapolis, Maryland: Naval Institute Press. pp. 1–104. ISBN 0-85177-245-5.
- Roberts, John (1979). "Great Britain and Empire Forces". In Chesneau, Roger & Kolesnik, Eugene M. (eds.). Conway's All the World's Fighting Ships 1860-1905. Greenwich, UK: Conway Maritime Press. pp. 1–113. ISBN 0-8317-0302-4.
- Silverstone, Paul H. (1984). Directory of the World's Capital Ships. New York: Hippocrene Books. ISBN 0-88254-979-0.
- "Transcript: HMS Donegal - October 1914 to December 1916, British waters, Central & North Atlantic, North Russia (Part 1 of 2)". Royal Navy Log Books of the World War 1 Era. Naval-History.net.
