= Doctor Morelle =

1949 British film by Godfrey Grayson

- Directed by: Godfrey Grayson
- Written by: Wilfred Burr (stage play); Ernest Dudley (radio show); Ambrose Grayson; Roy Plomley
- Produced by: Anthony Hinds
- Starring: Valentine Dyall; Peter Drury; Hugh Griffith; Julia Lang
- Cinematography: Cedric Williams
- Edited by: Ray Pitt
- Music by: Rupert Grayson; Frank Spencer
- Production company: Hammer Film Productions
- Distributed by: Exclusive Films (UK)
- Release date: 27 June 1949 (UK)
- Running time: 73 minutes
- Country: United Kingdom
- Language: English
- Budget: $56,000

Doctor Morelle (also known as Dr. Morelle: The Case of the Missing Heiress) is a 1949 British second feature ('B') mystery film directed by Godfrey Grayson and starring Valentine Dyall, Julia Lang, Peter Drury and Hugh Griffith. Made by Hammer Films, it was written by Ambrose Grayson and Roy Plomley, based on Wilfred Burr's stage play and Ernest Dudley's long-running BBC radio series, which had originally starred Dennis Arundell and then Heron Carvic.

It was considered a lost film, but it subsequently resurfaced on internet video sites circa 2014, courtesy of "The Video Ghost", a video uploader who re-uploads vintage radio shows and films.

== Plot ==
Private detective Doctor Morelle, who is intrigued by a case of a wealthy young woman named Cynthia Mason who has mysteriously vanished, visits her gloomy mansion to investigate. His secretary Miss Frayle poses as a maid and gets Bensall the butler to help her investigate two possible suspects, the missing girl's stepfather Samuel Kimber and her paramour Peter Lorrimer. Bensall is murdered along the way, and Miss Frayle is rescued from being buried alive by Dr. Morelle, who manages to reveal who killed Cynthia Mason.

== Cast ==
- Valentine Dyall as Doctor Morelle
- Peter Drury as Peter Lorrimer
- Hugh Griffith as Bensall, the butler
- Julia Lang as Miss Frayle
- Jean Lodge as Cynthia Mason
- Philip Leaver as Samuel Kimber
- Sidney Vivian as Inspector
- James Raglan
- Bruce Walker

== Production ==
This was the first film Hammer produced at their Cookham Dean studio, and in 1958, when Hammer celebrated their tenth anniversary, they showed a print of Doctor Morelle, citing it as the first real Hammer Film. In addition to writing the radio series, Ernest Dudley also wrote many novels and short stories featuring the character of Morelle. In 1949, Hammer had intended to produce a series of Dr. Morelle films, but Dudley would not allow it, since in 1949 he was planning on producing the films himself.

== Reception ==
The Monthly Film Bulletin wrote: "Although the surprise ending provides a gleam of interest, the film as a whole is built on such a mass of absurdities as to be beyond all plausibility. Valentine Dyall brings his imposing presence and intense manner to bear upon the part of Dr. Morelle with good effect, whilst Julia Lang is sufficiently witless as Miss Frayle. The eerie effect produced by lighting and photography is the film's best feature."

Kine Weekly wrote: "Crisp, compact, stylishly cut thriller ... An exciting surprise climax appropriately crowns a" miniature super." Capital British programmer."

Picturegoer wrote: "I doubt if a page from the doctor's casebook is as effective at length as it was when curtailed, but I don't think the radio series fans will be disappointed. ...Valentine Dyall is the doctor, and Julia Lang is good as Miss Frayle. Support is sound, and you are kept guessing effectively as to whom the murderer was."

The Radio Times noted "The first (and last) of an intended series based on a popular radio detective, this undistinguished B-feature murder mystery is typical of the early postwar output of Hammer before it discovered horror ... Dyall has considerable presence but it's not enough to surmount the implausible plot."

In British Sound Films: The Studio Years 1928–1959 David Quinlan rated the film as "mediocre", writing: "Good radio characters wasted in story built on absurdities."

Sky Movies wrote, "Each week from 1942 on, millions of radio listeners thrilled to the creepy adventures that presented 'the secret papers of perhaps the strangest personality in the history of criminal investigation. The mysterious Dr Morelle and his always-in-peril Girl Friday, Miss Frayle, were a natural for films but, as with so many other popular radio sleuths, the British Cinema failed to do right by them even though the slightly sinister Valentine Dyall was perfect casting as the detective doctor."
