= Doris Arnold =

British radio presenter, producer, and pianist (1904–1969)

Doris Grace Arnold (4 November 1904 – 5 October 1969) was a BBC Radio presenter and producer, and a pianist.

Born in Wimbledon, Surrey, in 1904, Arnold joined the BBC in 1929, as a typist. She first appeared on air as a stand-in for a pianist who was unwell. She married fellow pianist, BBC producer and songwriter Harry S. Pepper, and the two would perform piano duets together on air.

As presenter of the programme These You Have Loved, in which she played and talked about light classical recordings, she was one of the BBC's (and thus the United Kingdom's) first female disc jockeys. She also arranged music for male voice choirs.

In 1934, she featured on a cigarette card, in the Wills series Radio Celebrities. She also appeared as a castaway on the BBC Radio programme Desert Island Discs on 25 September 1967.

Arnold died in 1969 at Denham, Buckinghamshire.
