= Ronnie Waldman =

British radio presenter and TV executive (1914–1978)

Ronald Hartley Waldman (13 May 1914 – 10 March 1978) was a British radio presenter and television executive for the BBC.

== Early life and education ==
Born in London, he was the eldest son of Michael Waldman OBE JP, a sometime Mayor of Hackney, and was educated at Dame Alice Owen's School, Islington, and Pembroke College, Oxford.

His brother Stanley was a barrister.

== Career ==
Waldman began his career as an actor and producer (1935–1938) before joining the BBC variety department in 1938. Following wartime service in the Royal Air Force Volunteer Reserve, he became the assistant Head of Variety Productions in 1948.

The British public knew him best for his work with Harry S. Pepper as presenter of the popular Monday Night at Eight radio magazine programme, which was broadcast every week live. The programme started in 1937 as "Monday Night at Seven", becoming "Monday Night at Eight" soon after the outbreak of the Second World War. It was broadcast throughout the war and continued for several years after it. Waldman's speciality was "Puzzle Corner", with a "deliberate mistake" which listeners were invited to spot in time for next week's show. Each week saw a birthday guest star allowed four wishes, and one wish came true if it could be arranged.

In October 1950, during Patrick Cyril Henry Hillyard's leave of absence, Waldman was appointed the temporary head of light entertainment for television at the BBC. He launched many distinguished names in light entertainment, such as Julie Andrews and Morecambe and Wise.

Waldman later served as the Business Manager of BBC Television Programmes (1958–1960), General Manager of BBC Television Enterprises (1960–1963), Managing Director of Visnews (1963–1977), President of the Lord's Taverners (1966) and as a trustee of the International Institute of Communications (1975–1978).

== Personal life ==
His recreations included music and cricket. He died from cancer in March 1978, aged 63. He left a widow, the actress Lana Morris, whom he had married in 1953, and a son.
