= Eight Man (video game) =

1991 video game

- Arcade flyer
- Developer: Pallas
- Publisher: SNK
- Director: Seigo Ito
- Producer: Eikichi Kawasaki
- Programmers: Nishidon; Shinchan
- Writer: Kazumasa Hirai
- Composers: Yoshihiko Kitamura; Yoko Osaka; Makiko
- Series: 8 Man
- Platforms: Arcade, Neo Geo AES
- Release: Arcade: WW: 7 June 1991; Neo Geo AES: WW: 20 November 1991
- Genre: Beat 'em up
- Modes: Single-player, multiplayer
- Arcade system: Neo Geo MVS

Eight Man (Note: Japanese: 8マン, Hepburn: Eitoman) is a 1991 beat 'em up video game developed by Pallas and published by SNK for the Neo Geo MVS arcade system and the Neo Geo AES home console. It is based on Kazumasa Hirai's manga and anime character of the same name, who is considered one of the earliest Japanese cyborg superhero characters. Staying true to its concept of a crime-fighting super-robot, players take the role of 8 Man and his robo-comrade 9 Man respectively in a fight against an invading evil robot army.

== Gameplay ==
Gameplay screenshot

Eight Man is a side-scrolling beat 'em up game where players control the cyborg superhero 8 Man (P1) and his former rival comrade 9 Man (P2), across ten stages that take place in a futuristic setting where a bio-computer system called Cyber is threatening mankind with his army of robots. During gameplay, players can only move between left and right in the levels, while enemies are fought with either the A or C button (which activates the character's special attack), in addition of the B button that serves for jumping and pressing it when holding the joystick down, the characters perform a slide movement. The levels are broken into different phases and some of them involves the players chasing a vehicle, while enemies are coming out to attack. Power-ups are also scattered along the way to be collected that will enhance the player's attacks, as well as granting screen-clearing bombs that damages all enemies in sight. After reaching the end of a level, a boss must be fought in order to progress onto the next stage.

If a memory card is present, the player is allowed to save their progress and resume into the last stage the game saved at.

== Release ==
Eight Man was initially launched for arcades on June 7, 1991, and later during the same period for the Neo Geo AES in November 1991

== Reception ==
Reception

Review scores
Publication	Score
AllGame	(Arcade)
GameFan	(Neo Geo) 296 / 400
GamePro	(Neo Geo) 21 / 25
Joypad	(Neo Geo) 84%
Mega Fun	(Neo Geo) 73%
Micom BASIC Magazine	(Neo Geo)
Player One	(Neo Geo) 65%

RePlay reported Eight Man to be the fourth most popular arcade game of October 1991. Eight Man received mixed to positive reception since its initial release in arcades and Neo Geo AES.
