= Harry S. Pepper =

British musician, actor and producer (1891–1970)

Harry S. Pepper on a Wills cigarette card of 1934

Harry Stephen Pepper (27 August 1891 – 26 June 1970) was a British pianist, songwriter, composer, actor, and BBC producer, whose career stretched from Edwardian era seaside entertainments to BBC television in the 1950s.

== Early life ==
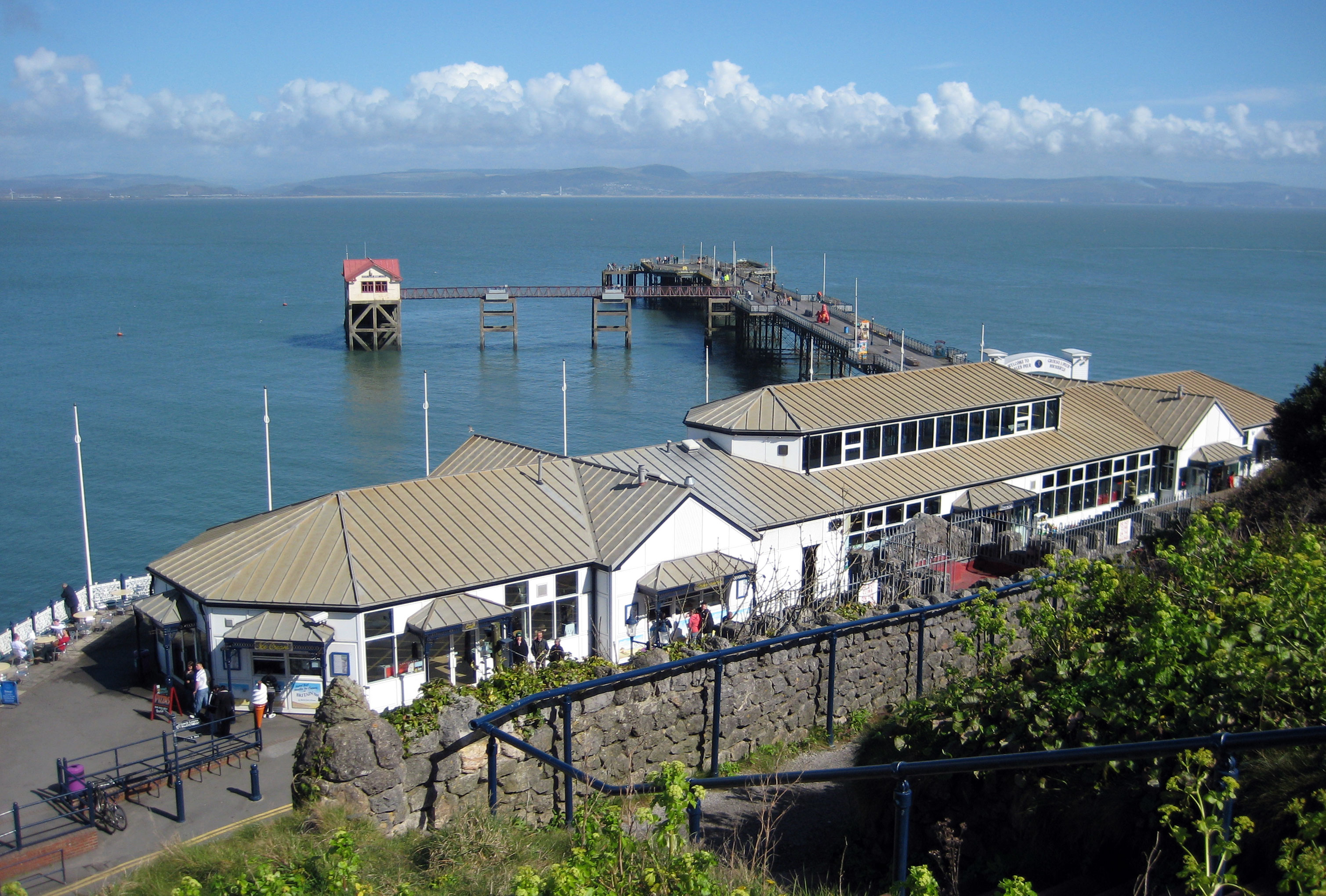
Mumbles Pier

Born at Putney, Pepper was the son of Will C. Pepper, by his marriage to Annie Leaver. In the summer of 1899, his father founded a long-running concert party called the White Coons on Mumbles Pier. They later played the summer season at Felixstowe, first appearing there in 1906 and last in 1920. Harry S. Pepper had an older brother, Dick Pepper (1889–1962), who at that time was a banjo player. Pepper wrote in 1937, "When I wasn't selling programmes and issuing tickets, I used to act as accompanist in my father's seaside concert party, Will C. Pepper's White Coons."

== Career ==
Pepper worked many times with Stanley Holloway, whose stage career began in 1910 when he travelled to Walton-on-the-Naze to audition for the White Coons Show. Holloway went on to star with Harry S. Pepper in The Co-Optimists, a film musical of 1929.

Following his years with the White Coons, Pepper became an assistant to Jimmy Glover, musical director at the Theatre Royal, Drury Lane.

Pepper and Mark Lubbock were recruited by the BBC in 1933, both being noted as "established composers of light music", and Pepper became a presenter in the early days of BBC Television, which had begun in 1932. In 1933 he presented a revue called Looking In, with John Watt as co-presenter. Meanwhile, BBC Radio had a much greater audience, and there he produced and presented The Kentucky Minstrels, a blackface minstrel series broadcast from 1933, which was a forerunner of The Black and White Minstrel Show. According to Maurice Gorham, Pepper was "a great character, born and brought up to show business... He brought a pleasantly breezy atmosphere into the BBC." Gorham tells the story that when Vice-Admiral Sir Charles Carpendale interviewed Pepper for a job, he asked him "How old are you?" and got the reply "Forty-four, how old are you?"

From 1937 to 1939 Pepper produced a weekly one-hour magazine programme on the BBC Home Service called Monday Night at Seven, working closely with Ronnie Waldman as the main presenter. In October 1939 this became Monday Night at Eight and ran until 1948. In the early years, Pepper and Waldman would tour the seaside summer shows, looking for new talent. From 1938 to 1940, Pepper also co-produced the radio comedy show Band Waggon, with Gordon Crier.

As a contribution to the Festival of Britain of 1951, the BBC produced The Golden Year, claimed to be the first musical comedy ever made for television, with original music by Pepper.

In retirement, Pepper and his wife lived in a cottage at Denham, Buckinghamshire, next to the producer Michael Barry, as was revealed in November 1956 when Pepper was an early subject of the BBC television programme This Is Your Life. Pepper's notable songs include "Hear My Song, Violetta", adapted from a German tango called "Hoer mein Lied, Violetta" (Rudi Lukesch/Othmar Klose); the English lyrics for "I Lost My Heart in Heidelberg" (1935), and the words and music for "Goodnight, God Bless". Another song Pepper wrote is "Carry Me Back to Green Pastures", recorded by Red Allen.

Pepper died on 26 June 1970, leaving an estate worth £29,094. At the time of his death, his address was 4, Baconsmead, Old Mill Road, Denham, Buckinghamshire.

== Personal life ==
In 1943, in Bangor, Gwynedd, Pepper married Doris Arnold (1904–1969), a pianist who had become a BBC Radio presenter and producer, more than ten years after they had revived the White Coons show for BBC Radio with Stanley Holloway, Joe Morley, C. Denier Warren, and Jane Carr.

== In popular culture ==
In 1934, a portrait of Pepper was issued on a W. D. & H. O. Wills cigarette card, in the "Radio Personalities" series.

Pepper was a national figure in the days of the weekly Monday Night at Eight programme, promoted by the jingle which ended every show:

Produced by Harry Pepper, and Ronnie Waldman too,
We hope the programme hasn't caused a frown
So goodbye everybody, it's time to say goodnight,
For Monday Night at Eight is closing down.

According to Larry Portis, the "Sergeant Pepper" referred to in the Beatles song "Sgt. Pepper's Lonely Hearts Club Band" is "the ghost of either Will Pepper or his son Harry S. Pepper", described by Portis as "two outstanding figures in English show business".

== Filmography ==
- The Co-Optimists (1929) – performer
- Kentucky Minstrels (1934)
- My Heart Is Calling (1935) – music
- The Student's Romance (1935) – lyrics
- Band Waggon (1940) – writer
- The Golden Year (1951) – original music
- Bright Young Things (2003) – credited for "Hear My Song, Violetta"
