= Scott and Whaley =

African American comedy duo

Comedy career
- Years active: 1905–1946
- Genres: Comedy, minstrelsy
- Former members: Harry Scott; Eddie Whaley

Scott and Whaley were an American comedy duo who played in British music halls from 1909, settled in England, and remained popular for over thirty years. They were Harry Clifford Scott (18 November 1879 – 22 June 1947) and Edward Peter Whaley (22 September 1877 – 13 November 1960). They were the first black performers to take the leading roles in a British film, and usually performed in character as Pussyfoot and Cuthbert.

== Careers ==
Eddie Whaley was born in Montgomery, Alabama, but fled the family for whom he had become a houseboy after his parents died, travelled to New York, and sang on the streets. Harry Scott was born in Cleveland, Ohio. They met in 1905 and joined together as a comedy double act, working in the northern United States in touring shows including the Dark Town Swells. In 1909, they travelled to England, originally intending to stay for no more than eight weeks, and made their first appearance in Sheffield. They remained in the country, and premiered in London the following year.

They performed cross-talking comedy, together with songs and dances, and rapidly became popular, remaining so for the next thirty years. Whaley was the smartly-dressed straight man, and Scott the clown. Scott – but not Whaley – applied blackface make-up, with exaggerated white lips and contorted facial expressions, and performed as a stereotype of an ignorant rural simpleton. In their act, they engaged "in an incessant to-and-fro stream of badinage, put-downs and punning humour", and "demonstrated some of the stereotypical conceptions of blacks... such as a happy-go-lucky gregariousness, a good-humoured argumentativeness which could spill over into threats of physical aggression, a propensity to be light-fingered, an incorrigible fondness for drinking, smoking and shooting dice.. and an entrenched aversion to work." They also incorporated surreal touches "which prefigured aspects of postwar comedy." Additionally, Whaley sang and Scott played jazz piano. It was claimed that they were the first performers to introduce ragtime to Britain, and on one occasion a conductor described their music as impossible to play, so that Scott played it himself.

Scott and Whaley both became British citizens. From 1929, they appeared on BBC radio as their characters Pussyfoot (Scott) and Cuthbert (Whaley), sometimes billed as the Celebrated Koloured Komedy Kings. They featured in the popular show Kentucky Minstrels between 1933 and 1946, and appeared in other programmes. Their scripts were written by Con West, but according to Denis Gifford "their tangle-talk was often the result of inept script-reading." They also continued as Pussyfoot and Cuthbert in live theatre performances, and toured Europe and Australia. They performed in the 1934 film Kentucky Minstrels, becoming the first black performers to star in a British film, and reprised their roles in the 1938 film Take Off That Hat. In 1941, their partnership was explored in a special radio programme on "these two famous coloured comedians who make you laugh and once had to hobo because they hadn't a penny in the world.... a story of courage, pathos, comedy, and tears."

The pair split up in 1946, the year before Scott's death in London at the age of 67. Whaley briefly teamed up with another comedian, Chris Gill. Whaley had lived in Brighton from the late 1930s, where he owned a hotel used by many visiting black entertainers. He died there in 1960, aged 83, and is remembered in the name of a Brighton bus.

His son, Eddie Whaley Jr., performed on stage with his father as "Little Whaley", and, as a seven-year-old child, in the 1947 film Black Narcissus. After military service in the United States, he took up a career as a performer in Britain, becoming a member of the Deep River Boys in the late 1950s, before returning to live in the U.S..
