= Richard Murdoch =

English actor (1907–1990)

- Born: Richard Bernard Murdoch; 6 April 1907; Keston, Kent, England
- Died: 9 October 1990 (aged 83); Walton-on-the-Hill, Surrey, England
- Occupations: Actor, comedian and writer
- Years active: 1932–1990
- Spouse: Peggy Rawlings (m. 1932)
- Children: 3

Richard Bernard Murdoch (6 April 1907 – 9 October 1990) was an English actor and entertainer.

After early professional experience in the chorus in musical comedy, Murdoch quickly moved on to increasingly prominent roles in musical comedy and revue in the West End and on tour. He made his first radio broadcast for the BBC in 1932 and in 1937 and 1938 he featured in early television broadcasts.

He came to national fame when cast with the comedian Arthur Askey in the radio show Band Waggon in 1938. Their contrasting styles appealed to the public and they took a version of the show on tour to theatres around the country and made a film adaptation of it. Serving in the Royal Air Force during the Second World War, Murdoch met a fellow officer, Kenneth Horne, and together they conceived, wrote and starred in the radio series Much-Binding-in-the-Marsh, which ran from 1944 to 1954. Murdoch's last long-running radio programmes were The Men from the Ministry (1962–1977) in which he played a well-meaning but disaster-prone civil servant, and Many a Slip, a panel game that combined humour and erudition, in which he appeared from 1964 to 1973.

Murdoch appeared on air and on stage in Australia, Canada and South Africa, and continued acting and broadcasting into his eighties.

== Life and career ==
=== Early years ===
Murdoch was born on 6 April 1907 at his family's home in Keston, Kent, the only son of Bernard Murdoch, a tea merchant, and his wife, Amy Florence, daughter of the Venerable Avison Terry Scott, archdeacon of Tunbridge Wells. He was educated at Charterhouse School in Surrey, and Pembroke College, Cambridge, which he left without taking a degree. His biographer Barry Took comments that Murdoch's appetite for a career in show business was "whetted by success with the Cambridge Footlights".

Murdoch made his professional stage debut in March 1927 at the Kings Theatre, Southsea, in the chorus of The Blue Train, a musical comedy starring Lily Elsie and directed by Jack Hulbert. He remained in the show when it opened in the West End in May of that year. He graduated from the chorus to a supporting role in a tour of Oh! Letty, a "musical farce" in which he was praised by Neville Cardus for "a stretch of distinguished dancing". In 1932 he married Peggy, daughter of William Rawlings, solicitor. They had one son and two daughters. During the 1930s he gained increasingly prominent roles in musicals and revues, including the secondary romantic lead to Jack Buchanan's star, in Stand up and Sing (1932), and the lead in a 1936 tour of Gay Divorce in the part played in New York and London by Fred Astaire.

The BBC transmitted a live radio relay of Stand up and Sing in April 1932, and Murdoch was in another such relay in 1934 in an entertainment called Bubbles. His first studio work for the corporation was in 1936 in a radio show called Tunes of the Town, and during 1937 and early 1938 he took part in five broadcasts by the fledgling BBC Television service, including an adaptation of Noël Coward's one-act comedy with music, Red Peppers in which he played the Coward role.

=== Band Waggon and Much-Binding-in-the-Marsh ===
In 1938 the BBC teamed Murdoch with Arthur Askey in the radio series Band Waggon, where they were soon billed as "Richard ('Stinker') Murdoch and "'Big-hearted' Arthur Askey". The smooth West End style of Murdoch contrasted with the down-to-earth humour of Askey, whose background was in seaside concert parties. Their main slot in the weekly show took up only about ten minutes, but caught the public imagination. They were depicted as occupying a flat on top of Broadcasting House. Took comments that their humour was a forerunner of much radio comedy to come:

… the fantasy of their living in Broadcasting House, and the creation of such mythical characters as Mrs Bagwash the charlady and her daughter Nausea and their pet animals, a goat called Lewis, and two pigeons Basil and Lucy, preceded ITMA and Hancock's Half Hour and was a strong influence on many nascent comedy scriptwriters.

Towards the end of 1938, after two series on the BBC, Band Waggon became a stage show. The impresario Jack Hylton presented the two stars and a supporting cast in a show that toured the provincial music-halls and finished with a run at the London Palladium in 1939. The Observer commented that they worked so well together because "they find the same things funny. Each has a special line of humour that sets the other going". The stars featured in a film adaptation in 1940.

Murdoch was conscripted into the Royal Air Force in 1941, serving as a pilot officer in the intelligence section of Bomber Command, before being posted to the Department of Allied Air Force and Foreign Liaison as a flight lieutenant. In 1943 he joined the Directorate of Administrative Plans at the Air Ministry, where he shared an office with wing commander Kenneth Horne, being responsible for the supply of aircraft and air equipment to Russia. He finished the war with the rank of Squadron Leader. Horne and Murdoch quickly became friends and as both were regular broadcasters they invented a fictitious RAF station Much-Binding-in-the-Marsh for a programme of the same name. It went on air in January 1944, and when peace came in 1945 it became a civilian airport and the show continued successfully; the last programme was in March 1954.

=== Later years ===
Murdoch's later career is described by Took as "varied and interesting". In 1954 the Australian Broadcasting Corporation presented a series of variety programmes called Much Murdoch, in which, during the run, he worked again with Horne, who took advantage of a three-week holiday to join him. Murdoch worked again with Askey in 1958 in the television series Living It Up, running a pirate TV station from the roof of Television House. His next major broadcasting success was the BBC radio series The Men from the Ministry (1962–1977). His character, Richard Lamb, was a well-meaning but not conspicuously bright civil servant, who, together with his equally disaster-prone superior, Roland Hamilton-Jones (Wilfrid Hyde-White) and later Deryck Lennox-Brown (Deryck Guyler), continually found the wrong answers to the pressing problems of government. Murdoch's last long running radio show was Many a Slip, a panel game that combined humour and erudition, in which he appeared from 1964 to 1973.

Murdoch appeared in two seasons at the Shaw Festival and on tour in North America, playing Aubrey in Tons of Money (1968) and William the waiter in You Never Can Tell (1973); he toured South Africa in a comedy called Not in the Book (1974), and toured Britain as Sir William Boothroyd, the role created by Ralph Richardson, in William Douglas-Home's Lloyd George Knew My Father. From 1978 to 1990, Murdoch had a long-running regular role as "Uncle Tom", the briefless senior barrister of chambers, in Rumpole of the Bailey. In 1981 he played the headmaster in Alan Bennett's Forty Years On. In 1989 he played Lord Caversham in Oscar Wilde's An Ideal Husband on tour and at the Westminster Theatre; The Times commented that he managed to make "Caversham's ghastly mixture of the sanctimonious, the roguish and the bluff" seem human.

== Personal life ==
In 1932, Murdoch married Peggy, the daughter of solicitor William Rawlings. The couple had two daughters and a son.

Murdoch, a keen golfer, died while playing golf at Walton Heath, Surrey, on 9 October 1990, aged 83. He was survived by his wife and children.

== Broadcasts ==
A partial list of Murdoch's broadcasts on radio and television:

=== Radio ===
- Band Waggon (1938–39)
- Much-Binding-in-the-Marsh (1944–54)
- Desert Island Discs, with Kenneth Horne (1952)
- Murdoch in Mayfair (1955)
- The Men from the Ministry (1962–77)
- A Slight Case of Murdoch (1987)
- Just a Minute (1988–90)

=== Television ===
- At Home, with Kenneth Horne and Sam Costa, BBC Television (1948)
- Free and Easy, with Kenneth Horne, BBC Television (1953)
- Show for the Telly, with Kenneth Horne, BBC Television (1956)
- Living It Up, with Arthur Askey, Associated-Rediffusion (1957–58)
- Rumpole of the Bailey, as T. C. "Uncle Tom" Rowley, Thames Television (1978–91)
- Winston Churchill: The Wilderness Years, as Lord Halifax, Southern Television (1981)
- The Black Adder, as Ross, A Lord, BBC Television (1983)
- The Moomins, as narrator, Children's ITV (1983)
- Never the Twain, Colonel Wainwright, Series 7, Episode 5 – "Born to Blush Unseen" Thames Television (1988)
- Mr Majeika, as Worshipful Wizard, TVS Television (1988–90)

== Films ==
- Looking on the Bright Side (1932) – Dancer (uncredited)
- Evergreen (1934) – Undetermined Role (uncredited)
- Over She Goes (1937) – Sergeant Oliver
- Red Peppers (TV – 1937) – George Pepper
- The Terror (1938) – Detective Lewis
- Band Waggon (1940) – Stinker Murdoch
- Charley's (Big-Hearted) Aunt (1940) – 'Stinker' Burton
- The Ghost Train (1941) – Teddy Deakin
- I Thank You (1941) – Stinker
- One Exciting Night (1944) – Illusionist
- It Happened in Soho (1948) – Bill Scott
- Golden Arrow a.k.a. The Gay Adventure (1949) – David Felton
- Lilli Marlene (1950) – F / Lt. Murdoch
- The Magic Box (1951) – Sitter in Bath Studio
- Strictly Confidential (1959) – Cmdr. Bissham-Ryley
- Not a Hope in Hell (1960) – Bertie
- Owner Occupied (TV – 1967) – Colonel Washbrook
- Under the Table You Must Go (1969) – Himself (documentary)
- Whoops Apocalypse (1986) – Cabinet Minister

== Bibliography ==
- Murdoch, Richard (1980). "Contributor". David Jacob's Book of Celebrities' Jokes & Anecdotes. By Jacobs, David. Robson Books. p. 116. ISBN 0860511251.

== References and sources ==
=== Sources ===
- Donovan, Paul (1991). The Radio Companion. London: HarperCollins. ISBN 978-0-246-13648-0.
- Gaye, Freda, ed. (1967). Who's Who in the Theatre (fourteenth ed.). London: Sir Isaac Pitman and Sons. OCLC 5997224.
- Gifford, Denis (1985). The Golden Age of Radio. London: Batsford. ISBN 978-0-7134-4234-2.
- Herbert, Ian, ed. (1977). Who's Who in the Theatre (sixteenth ed.). London and Detroit: Pitman Publishing and Gale Research. ISBN 978-0-273-00163-8.
- Johnston, Barry (2006). Round Mr Horne: The Life of Kenneth Horne. London: Aurum Press. ISBN 978-1-134-79432-4.
- Lewisohn, Mark (1998). Radio Times Guide to TV Comedy. London: BBC. ISBN 978-0-563-36977-6.
- Took, Barry (1998). Laughter in the Air: An Informal History of British Radio Comedy. London: Robson Books. ISBN 978-0-903895-78-1.
- Wagg, Stephen (2004). Because I Tell a Joke or Two: Comedy, Politics and Social Difference. London: Routledge. ISBN 978-1-134-79432-4.
