= Absolutely Fabulous series 1 =

Absolutely Fabulous
- Series 1
- UK DVD cover
- Starring: Jennifer Saunders; Joanna Lumley; Julia Sawalha; Jane Horrocks
- No. of episodes: 6

Release
- Original network: BBC Two
- Original release: 12 November – 17 December 1992

Series chronology
- Next → Series 2

The first series of the British television sitcom Absolutely Fabulous premiered on BBC Two on 12 November 1992 and concluded on 17 December 1992, consisting of six episodes. The sitcom was created and written by Jennifer Saunders, who starred in the title role of Edina Monsoon, a heavy-drinking, smoking, and drug-abusing PR agent who has dedicated most of her life to looking "fabulous" and desperately attempts to stay young. Edina is nicknamed 'Eddie' by her best friend, Patsy Stone (Joanna Lumley), a magazine editor who constantly takes advantage of Edina by living the life of luxury in Edina's extravagant home.

Edina is a twice-divorced mother of two. Her eldest child, a son, Serge, left home many years before in order to escape his mother's clutches. Her long-suffering daughter, Saffron 'Saffy', whom Edina is reliant upon, is a sixth form student and remains at home. The series also includes Edina's sweet-natured-but-slightly-batty mother (June Whitfield), whom Edina sees as an interfering burden, and Edina's dim-witted assistant Bubble (Jane Horrocks).

The series was conceived from the French and Saunders sketch "Modern Mother and Daughter", originally written by Saunders and Dawn French. Saunders has stated that the character of Edina Monsoon was based upon Lynne Franks, a PR agent whom she had joined on holiday.

== Cast and characters ==
=== Main ===
- Jennifer Saunders as Edina Monsoon
- Joanna Lumley as Patsy Stone
- Julia Sawalha as Saffron Monsoon
- Jane Horrocks as Bubble

=== Special guest ===
- June Whitfield as Mother

=== Recurring ===
- Christopher Malcolm as Justin

=== Guest ===
- Nickolas Grace as Jonny
- Lucy Blair as Lou-Lou (uncredited)
- Alexandra Bastedo as Penny Caspar-Morse
- Anthony Asbury as Georgy
- Russell Kilmister as surgeon
- Geoffrey McGivern as customs officer
- Juliette Mole as air hostess
- Robert Ripa as old Frenchman
- Tim Woodward as headmaster
- Naoko Mori as Sarah
- Lisa Coleman as Joanna
- Adrian Ross-Magenty as James
- James Lance as Daniel
- Paul Mark Elliot as teacher
- Sidney Cole as teacher
- Annabelle Hampson as headmistress
- Melanie Jessop as secretary
- Trisha Aileen as school secretary
- Mo Gaffney as Bo
- Christopher Ryan as Marshall
- Gary Beadle as Oliver
- Kathy Burke as Magda
- Harriet Thorpe as Fleur
- Helen Lederer as Catriona
- Eleanor Bron as Patsy's mother
- Adrian Edmondson as Hamish
- Dawn French as Kathy

== Episodes ==
| No. overall | No. in series | Title | Directed by | Written by | Original release date | Prod. code |
|---|---|---|---|---|---|---|
| 1 | 1 | "Fashion" | Bob Spiers | Jennifer Saunders | 12 November 1992 | LLCC521X |
After awakening with a hangover, Edina 'Eddie' Monsoon frantically prepares to launch a major fashion show. Meanwhile, her unsympathetic daughter, Saffron—to whom Edina had promised to quit drinking—often criticises her mother's unhealthy habits. Edina's best friend, Patricia 'Patsy' Stone, arrives to accompany her to work. At the office, Edina's assistant Bubble reports that one of the main models, Yasmin Le Bon, has dropped out, while Princess Anne has replaced Princess Diana on the guest list. Edina subsequently manages to cajole several B-list celebrities into attendance, turning the show into a rousing success. Later that night, Edina and Patsy indulge in a drunken bender—much to the disgust of Saffron, who locks Edina out of the house. The next morning, Edina and Patsy trick Saffron into believing that Edina is going to check into a rehabilitation clinic.
| 2 | 2 | "Fat" | Bob Spiers | Jennifer Saunders | 19 November 1992 | LLVQ731H |
Unable to fit into the majority of her clothes, Edina becomes determined to lose weight. At the office, she is horrified to learn of an upcoming visit by Penny Caspar-Morse, a thin model that used to torment Edina about her weight. Edina unsuccessfully attempts to exercise, and with Penny arriving earlier than expected, she accepts Patsy's suggestion to undergo a liposuction. After a disturbing nightmare about the procedure going horrifically wrong, Edina decides against the idea and instead covers herself up with an oversized sweatshirt. Patsy announces that Penny is blind, much to Edina's delight. Edina drunkenly rants at Penny about how she ruined her life and brags about how successful and thin she has become. However, she inadvertently reveals her weight as she places Penny's hands on her waist.
| 3 | 3 | "France" (Note: Alternatively titled "A Week in Provence".) | Bob Spiers | Jennifer Saunders | 26 November 1992 | LLVQ732B |
Edina and Patsy go on holiday in the South of France, where they find themselves staying in a rustic cottage, instead of the château they were expecting. There is no food or wine, and the duo are constantly disturbed by an old Frenchman whose French they cannot understand. They are later rescued by Saffron, who arrives with supplies. Bubble comes along to deliver an urgent message concerning Edina's home decorating business, but she forgets about it. When Saffron reminds Bubble about the message, Edina panics and rushes to return home. The old Frenchman stops by again and repeats his message to Bubble, who understands perfectly that Edina and Patsy have been staying in the wrong place, and were expected in the château down the road. Later, customs detains the group when a suspicious white powder is found in Patsy's luggage, but they are freed when the powder turns out to be a harmless substance. Patsy, instead of being relieved, is horrified as she realises she actually enjoyed playing ping-pong.
| 4 | 4 | "Iso Tank" | Bob Spiers | Jennifer Saunders | 3 December 1992 | LLVQ733W |
Patsy helps Edina break in her new isolation tank upstairs, while Saffron works with classmates on a presentation for her sixth form college's open day. Edina begins to feel useless after Bubble, now a dedicated professional, takes charge of the office. She takes a sudden interest in Saffron's presentation and begs to be invited to the open day. When Saffron vehemently refuses, Edina throws a tantrum and threatens to adopt a Romanian orphan—to the point of instructing Bubble to send over a selection of babies so she can choose one. She then frantically tries to cancel the deal, but it is too late. Saffron eventually allows Edina to attend the open day. However, the presentation is interrupted as the babies arrive and start wailing, angering Saffron. Edina wakes up in a panic, still in her isolation tank, and realises it was all a dream.
| 5 | 5 | "Birthday" | Bob Spiers | Jennifer Saunders | 17 December 1992 | LLVQ735J |
Edina is none too pleased about her 40th birthday. As opposed to the glamorous, star-studded surprise party she had hoped for, Edina is disappointed to learn that Saffron has planned a quiet lunch with family and friends—including both of Edina's ex-husbands, Justin and Marshall, and their respective new lovers, Oliver and Bo, as well as Patsy and Mother. Edina behaves erratically during the party, switching between self-pity and spite, and she soon provokes Oliver, her least favourite guest, into making an angry exit. Justin and Marshall are shocked to discover that they have both been paying alimony to Edina. While Edina and Patsy sing drunkenly on a new karaoke machine, Justin and Bo secretly plot to cut off Edina's alimony.
| 6 | 6 | "Magazine" | Bob Spiers | Jennifer Saunders | 10 December 1992 | LLVQ734P |
Patsy, who is temporarily staying with the Monsoons, becomes jealous when Edina reconnects with an old boyfriend. During one of her sporadic appearances at work, Patsy is assigned to host a fashion makeover segment on a morning television show. After clashing with the models, Patsy attempts to persuade Saffron and Mother to appear on the show in their place, telling a tale of her emotionally distant mother. Saffron agrees, on the condition that Patsy moves out of the house and does not interfere with Edina's relationship. Patsy's television appearance turns disastrous as she suddenly becomes nervous. After Patsy convinces Edina to break up with her boyfriend, Saffron chides Patsy for not upholding her end of the deal.

== Accolades ==
| Award | Year | Category | Recipient(s) | Result |
|---|---|---|---|---|
| British Academy Television Awards | 1993 | Best Comedy (Programme or Series) | Jennifer Saunders, Bob Spiers and Jon Plowman | Won |
| British Academy Television Awards | 1993 | Best Light Entertainment Performance | Joanna Lumley | Won |
| British Academy Television Awards | 1993 | Best Light Entertainment Performance | Jennifer Saunders | Nominated |
| British Academy Television Awards | 1993 | Best Costume Design | Sarah Burns | Nominated |
| British Comedy Awards | 1993 | Best New TV Comedy | Absolutely Fabulous | Won |
| British Comedy Awards | 1993 | Best Comedy Actress | Joanna Lumley | Won |
| British Comedy Awards | 1993 | Best Comedy Actress | Jennifer Saunders | Nominated |
| Writers' Guild of Great Britain Awards | 1993 | TV – Situation Comedy | Jennifer Saunders | Won |

== Release ==
=== Reception ===
Tim Gray of Variety magazine said that "Absolutely Fabulous, British sitcom about a rich, self-absorbed, falling-down-drunk woman, is not as funny as it intends to be, but it is absolutely unique, absolutely rude and absolutely politically incorrect". He also said that "AbFab offers no sense of justice, which may give viewers the heebie-jeebies, since Americans like to believe that the wicked, even if they are amusing, will get punished. But the characters are originals, and AbFab has the courage of its convictions, encouraging audiences to find humor in such recent comedic taboos as substance abuse or mistreated offspring."

In 1997, TV Guide ranked an episode number 47 on its list of the "100 Greatest Episodes of All-Time.

=== Home media ===
VHS

The first series of Absolutely Fabulous was released on VHS in the United Kingdom in two volumes, both of which contain three episodes per tape. These VHS tapes were released in October 1993. The Complete Series 1 was released on VHS in July 1995. The Complete Series 1 was again released as part of the Series 1-4 set, and as an individual release in November 2002.

DVD

Series 1 was made available in the United Kingdom on DVD format region 2 in November 2000, and as part of the Series 1-4 DVD set in November 2002. The "Absolutely Everything" set, with series 1-5 & specials, was released in November 2010, and most recently on the "Absolutely Everything: Definitive Edition" set, with series 1-5, specials & 20th anniversary specials, in March 2014.

In North America, Series 1 was released several times on DVD region 1. It was initially released in March 2001, with a re-issue in September 2005. All releases following the initial release of Series 1, apart from the re-issue, were released as part of DVD sets. Series 1-3 was released in October 2005. "Absolutely Everything" was released in May 2008.

In Australia, the first series debuted on DVD Region 4 in October 2001. Australia was the first country to release "Absolutely Everything", although, not every episode was released within the set. It includes series 1-5 and the specials, excluding 'The Last Shout'. This set was released in April 2006. "The Complete Collection", every episode including 'The Last Shout', was made available in April 2011.
