= Absolutely Fabulous series 5 =

Absolutely Fabulous
- Series 5
- UK DVD cover
- Starring: Jennifer Saunders; Joanna Lumley; Julia Sawalha; Jane Horrocks; June Whitfield
- No. of episodes: 8 (+ Christmas special)

Release
- Original network: BBC One
- Original release: 17 October – 24 December 2003

Series chronology
- ← Previous; Series 4

The fifth and final series of the British television sitcom Absolutely Fabulous premiered on BBC One on 17 October 2003 and concluded on 24 December 2003, consisting of eight episodes. A Christmas special, "White Box", followed the fifth series and was broadcast in 2004. Though no further series have followed, three specials were broadcast several years later to mark the show's 20th anniversary for 2012.

== Cast and characters ==
=== Main ===
- Jennifer Saunders as Edina Monsoon
- Joanna Lumley as Patsy Stone
- Julia Sawalha as Saffron Monsoon
- Jane Horrocks as Bubble / Katy Grin
- June Whitfield as Mother

=== Recurring ===
- Helen Lederer as Catriona
- Harriet Thorpe as Fleur
- Fern Britton as herself
- Emma Bunton as herself
- Felix Dexter as John
- Naoko Mori as Sarah
- Mo Gaffney as Bo
- Chris Ryan as Marshall
- Christopher Malcolm as Justin
- Simon Brodkin as doctor

=== Guest ===
- Llewella Gideon as tanning beautician
- Janette Krankie as midwife
- Kristin Scott Thomas as Plum
- Mariella Frostrup as herself
- Minnie Driver as herself
- Mossie Smith as Flossie
- Stephen Finegold as policeman
- Emer O'Connor as policewoman
- Clarissa Dickson Wright as herself
- Sergio Priftis as Chicago dancer
- Todd Talbot as Chicago dancer
- Simon Breen as Chicago dancer
- Zak Nemorin as Chicago dancer
- Richard Roe as Chicago dancer
- Robert Lindsay as Pete
- Katie Blake as Booberella actor
- Sam Spedding as Booberella actor
- Elton John as himself
- Charlotte Palmer as zoo keeper
- Perou as photographer
- Jean Paul Gaultier as himself
- Alex Lowe as wood cutter
- Eleanor Bron as Patsy's mother
- Kate O'Mara as Jackie
- Amy Phillips as paramedic
- Marion Pashley as nurse

=== "White Box" guest cast ===
- Nathan Lane as Kunz
- Laurie Metcalf as Crystalline
- Miranda Richardson as Bettina
- Patrick Barlow as Max
- Mo Gaffney as Bo
- Christopher Ryan as Marshall
- Miranda Hart as Yoko
- Terence Conran as himself

== Episodes ==
No. overall	No. in series	Title	Directed by	Written by	Original release date	UK viewers (millions)
28	1	"Cleanin'"	Dewi Humphreys	Jennifer Saunders	17 October 2003	7.69
Edina's home is a mess, and she has done some more remodelling as usual. The changes include a pool in her bathroom, and a shower that washes and buffs her like a car wash. Her new client Emma Bunton comes by to discuss new jobs. It turns out Saffron was Emma's head girl at school and Emma knows that Saffron would be disturbed by Edina's squalid house. When they realise that Saffron is coming home that day from volunteer work in Africa, Emma urges everyone to clean up. Patsy gets obsessed by organising a drawer full of odds and ends. When Saffron arrives, Edina taunts Saffron for becoming fat and fulfilling her "genetic fate." Saffron informs her that she is not fat, she is pregnant. Edina tells Saffron that she should tell people that she is pregnant right away or people will think she is fat.
29	2	"Book Clubbin'"	Dewi Humphreys	Jennifer Saunders	24 October 2003	7.87
Edina has a nightmare about Saffron's baby trying to stab her. It turns out that the face of the nightmare baby belongs to Saffron's midwife, who delights in teasing Edina about these nightmares. Edina expresses her displeasure about this baby. Saffron invites the father of the baby to the house to tell him she is pregnant. In the meantime, Edina and Patsy have organised a book club, but no one is interested in reading any books except celebrity magazines. When Edina discovers that John Johnson, the father of Saffron's baby is black, she is overjoyed, because she thinks a mixed-race baby is the greatest accessory, the "Chanel of babies." When Saffron tells John that she is pregnant, he replies that she should tell people that she is pregnant right away or people will think she is fat.
30	3	"Panickin'"	Dewi Humphreys	Jennifer Saunders	31 October 2003	6.15
Edina builds a panic room. Patsy is at her shop, Jeremy's, when Minnie Driver walks in. Minnie complains about not scoring any free stuff from other shops at Bond Street, and takes pictures of herself shopping to sell to the paparazzi. Patsy is determined to become Minnie's stylist, so she later invites Minnie to Edina's house. She has gathered racks of designer outfits with which to dress Minnie. When Minnie wants a necklace that Edina is wearing, Patsy wrestles Edina for it, and they accidentally lock themselves in the panic room. They believe they will be unable to escape for days because Patsy panicked and kept pressing the buttons on the keypad. While they are locked in, they play Trivial Pursuit over the intercom and camera with Saffron. They also discover that Minnie Driver has taken all the designer clothes. At the end, Edina and Patsy discover they were locked in for only a couple of hours.
31	4	"Huntin', Shootin' & Fishin'"	Dewi Humphreys	Jennifer Saunders	7 November 2003	7.02
Edina begins an ad campaign for Prince Charles' biscuits, and claims that it is "by royal appointment". Consequently, she begins to associate with the wealthy socialite crowd, and buys a weekend at a country house hotel at a Tatler auction. Saffron typically disapproves of Edina's plans to go game hunting for sport. Upon arrival, Patsy and Edina discover that nothing is in season, and the place doesn't even have any jacuzzis or massage. So they content themselves with horseback riding and clay pigeon shooting. Patsy tells Edina that the Rothschilds were laughing at her. Edina becomes angry and determines that she will kill something, and goes out with Patsy with guns blazing in the middle of the night. They bring a pheasant back to the hotel, which Edina puts in the closet. In the morning they discover that the pheasant is still alive. Patsy tells Edina to pull its neck but Edina bonds with it and drugs it and releases it into Hyde Park. At home, Emma Bunton and Sarah bring gifts to Saffron for a baby shower, and Sarah becomes obsessed with Emma. Sarah stalks Emma, and Saffron eventually calls the police and has Sarah arrested.
32	5	"Birthin'"	Dewi Humphreys	Jennifer Saunders	14 November 2003	7.19
Saffron is preparing her home birth kit. She's due to have the baby anytime, and she wants to have it at home. Patsy is the hostess of the Style Awards at the Royal Albert Hall, and she arrives wearing a very expensive, one-off Huki Muki made of silkworm saliva. Edina helps Patsy rehearse her speech but is interrupted by Katy Grin, Bo, and Marshall. Katy talks about her work in the musical Chicago. Bo and Marshall talk about their Christian Family Creation adoption service, which is a service for busy Hollywood actresses who have no time or desire for pregnancy. Saffron and Patsy shove each other trying to get up the stairs, and then suddenly Saffron's waters break, spilling baby juice all over Patsy's expensive clothing. Mrs. M. attempts to save the Huki Muki, but she accidentally burns it with an iron. Saffron retreats to her bedroom with contractions. In a rare moment of support for her daughter, Edina tells Patsy she won't be able to go to the awards show. Mrs. M. runs to go get forceps, and Katy Grin sneakily makes a phone call to say she can fill in for Patsy at the awards show. John and Justin next arrive to the house, and Edina tries to show up her ex-husband by telling John that Justin is gay. Bo gets drunk and develops a plot to snatch the baby for the adoption service. Justin and John go to change the hot water settings, but they accidentally knock out the house's power. Patsy tries on some of Edina's clothes, but is a laughing stock. Katy runs off to be a hostess at the awards. Edina protects her daughter from Bo and Marshall's baby snatching scheme, but Patsy decides to help Bo and Marshall get the baby. Saffron eventually gives birth to a healthy baby girl. She and John name the baby "Jane", but Edina prefers the name "Lola." Bo and Marshall flee the house thinking they've taken the baby, but they have taken the placenta by mistake.
33	6	"Schmoozin'"	Dewi Humphreys	Jennifer Saunders	28 November 2003	5.22
Edina's 'new' boyfriend Pete is a tape engineer who used to work at Abbey Road Studios during the time that the Beatles recorded there, and who had found some unreleased tapes. In a studio, the girls have fun and Edina sings her 'walking down the road' song she loves. There are flashbacks from the sixties where Patsy is a man and they are at a recording for the Sgt. Pepper album. Back at home, Elton John had been invited to the party to debut the Beatles tapes, but gets annoyed and leaves when he discovers he was only invited to play piano in the background. Finally, just after proposing marriage to Edina, Pete plays the tapes at the party. Instead of The Beatles, Edina is heard singing. Apparently this is because Patsy had pressed the record button on the recorder in the studio by mistake whilst she was looking for champagne in the control room, and Edina unknowingly sang over the tapes. After realising they're lost forever, Pete collapses on the floor. The episode ends with Edina announcing she is off to New York because Yoko Ono wants her to record an album.
34	7	"Exploitin'"	Dewi Humphreys	Jennifer Saunders	5 December 2003	5.86
Patsy has booked Saffron's baby Jane (Lola) for a photo shoot with Jean-Paul Gaultier. Gran usually babysits Jane on Thursdays, so that Saffron can go out with John. But Gran does not come this Thursday, because Edina has banned her from the house. So Saffron and John are stuck at home, and Patsy can not take the baby to the photo shoot. Patsy and Edina prey on Saffron's insecurities and tell her that John will lose interest in her, Saffron bursts into tears and agrees and asks Edina to look after Jane while she goes out with John. Edina and Patsy plan to take the baby to have a photo shoot at the London Zoo. Saffron returns and finds out they took the baby out against her wishes and Edina explains that she has bonded with Jane, however it is later discovered that Edina has brought home the wrong baby.
Christmas Special (2003)
35	-	"Cold Turkey" (Note: Alternatively titled "Drinkin'".)	Dewi Humphreys	Jennifer Saunders	24 December 2003	6.91
For the first time ever, Edina has agreed to stay home and spend Christmas with the family. Edina typically goes overboard by buying a huge tree and tons of gifts. Patsy is very upset that she cannot go away on vacation with Edina as they do every year, as she hates Christmas. Patsy has a flashback of unpleasant Christmas memories of her childhood. Someone somewhere sticks a pin in a Patsy voodoo doll, and she collapses in pain beneath the Christmas tree. Although Edina and Saffron ignore her, John insists that Patsy needs to go to the hospital. Once at the hospital, the doctors tell Edina that Patsy is very sick and that she may die. Edina and Saffron return to the house to continue their Christmas celebration. In the middle of the night, Patsy's estranged sister Jackie arrives to visit her. The following day, Edina and Saffron drop by only to learn from a nurse that Patsy has died, only they find out that it turns out to be Jackie instead. At Christmas lunch, Patsy shocks everyone by asking for a slice of turkey. She manages to chew and swallow, but after not eating solid food for decades she chokes on it. Note: This episode runs at 35 minutes; however, in repeated airings, or streaming services, it is edited to 28 minutes for timing reasons. All BBC repeats have remained unedited.
Christmas Special (2004)
36	-	"White Box"	Ed Bye	Jennifer Saunders	25 December 2004	6.34
Edina decides to remodel the kitchen again, and calls up her old minimalist friends. It turns out Bettina is divorced and is clinically insane and Max is revealed to be gay. Bettina transforms the kitchen into a stairless white box, but Edina hates it. Patsy, meanwhile, develops serious health problems and walks around with an IV stand. Saffron returns from her wedding to John in Kenya and reveals that he is a polygamist. Edina and Patsy head off to meet designers Terence Conran and Kunz for inspiration. At Kunz's store, Edina claims to have seen her ideal kitchen in a previous life, so she hires a channeller. The channelling session results in so much disruption in the household that Saffron and Edina argue once again, and Edina lashes out at baby Jane in anger. Saffron has finally reached breaking point, and kicks Edina and Patsy out of the house, which is in her name. Edina and Patsy end up lounging in the stylish window display of Terence Conran's Shop.

== Award and nominations ==
Series 5

Television and Radio Industries Club Awards

—Won: TRIC Award for Best TV Comedy Programme

White Box

BAFTA Awards

—Nominated: BAFTA Award for Best Make Up & Hair Design – Christine Cant

== Home media ==
DVD (Region 1)

- "Series 5" – 13 September 2005
- As part of "Absolutely Fabulous: Absolutely Everything" (9-disc set) – 27 May 2008
- As Part of the "Absolutely Fabulous: Absolutely All of It!" (10-disc set) - 5 November 2013

DVD (Region 2)

- "Series 5" – 27 September 2004
- As part of "Absolutely Fabulous: Absolutely Everything" (10-disc set) – 15 November 2010
- As part of "Absolutely Fabulous: Absolutely Everything - The Definitive Edition" (11-disc set) – 17 March 2014

DVD (Region 4)

- "Series 5" – 8 April 2004
- As part of "Absolutely Fabulous: Absolutely Everything" (9-disc set) – 20 April 2006
- As part of "Absolutely Fabulous: Complete Collection" (10-disc set) – 5 April 2011
- As Part of the "Absolutely Everything: Definitive Edition" (11-disc set) – 30 April 2014

'White Box special

- United States
  - "White Box" – 16 October 2007
  - As part of "Absolutely Fabulous: Absolutely Everything" (9-disc set) – 27 May 2008
  - As Part of the "Absolutely Fabulous: Absolutely All of It!" (10-disc set) - 5 November 2013
- United Kingdom
  - As part of "Absolutely Fabulous: Absolutely Everything" (10-disc set) – 15 November 2010
  - As part of "Absolutely Fabulous: Absolutely Everything - The Definitive Edition" (11-disc set) – 17 March 2014

Note: "White Box" has never been released in the UK as an individual DVD, but was first released as part of the "Absolutely Everything" collection in 2010

- Australia
  - "White Box" – 2 November 2005
  - As part of "Absolutely Fabulous: Absolutely Everything" (9-disc set) – 20 April 2006
  - As part of "Absolutely Fabulous: Complete Collection" (10-disc set) – 5 April 2011
  - As Part of the "Absolutely Everything: Definitive Edition" (11-disc set) – 30 April 2014

== Other media ==
A behind-the-scenes special documentary, "The Story Of Absolutely Fabulous", was broadcast on 2 January 2004. The special gives a definitive account of the history of the series.

A Comic Relief special sketch of Absolutely Fabulous was broadcast on 11 March 2005. The story follows Edina and Patsy as they reluctantly accompany Emma Bunton to the taping of Comic Relief at the BBC Television Centre. Inside, a member of the production staff can't find Emma's name on the list of presenters, prompting Edina to suggest they check again under Queen Noor or Lulu. Emma and Edina bicker in a dressing room when Edina insists that the point of Emma's participation should be to gain greater exposure for herself. Edina urges Emma to lobby director and Comic Relief founder Richard Curtis for a role in one of his films. When Richard visits the dressing room to apologise for Emma having been left off the list, Edina and Patsy fail to recognise him and ask him to fetch Richard straightaway. Emma angrily writes a cheque to the charity and storms off. When the production staffer returns to collect Emma (now scheduled to appear after Graham Norton), Edina and Patsy first conceal (in the dressing room) and then loudly acknowledge (on-stage, live, during the Comic Relief special) Emma's departure. Patsy is struck by stage fright while Edina attempts a song. Once Patsy wets herself, both are quickly shooed from the stage by a horrified Graham. Miranda Hart also appears in the sketch as a production staffer.
