= Absolutely Fabulous series 2 =

Absolutely Fabulous
- Series 2
- UK DVD cover
- Starring: Jennifer Saunders; Joanna Lumley; Julia Sawalha; Jane Horrocks
- No. of episodes: 6

Release
- Original network: BBC One
- Original release: 27 January – 10 March 1994

Series chronology
- ← Previous; Series 1 Next → Series 3

The second series of the British television sitcom Absolutely Fabulous premiered on BBC One on 27 January 1994 and concluded on 10 March 1994, consisting of six episodes.

== Cast and characters ==
=== Main ===
- Jennifer Saunders as Edina Monsoon
- Joanna Lumley as Patsy Stone
- Julia Sawalha as Saffron Monsoon
- Jane Horrocks as Bubble

=== Special guest ===
- June Whitfield as Mother

=== Guest ===
- Kathy Burke as Magda
- Helen Lederer as Catriona
- Harriet Thorpe as Fleur
- Jennifer Piercey as Antonia
- Naoko Mori as Sarah
- Llewella Gideon as Nurse
- Orla Brady as Nurse Mary
- David Henry as Mr Simpson
- Gwen Humble as Sondra Lorrance
- Christopher Ryan as Marshall
- Mark Tandy as Mark
- Natascha Taylor as art gallery assistant
- Ciaran McIntyre as vicar
- Haroon Hanif as Yentob
- Karim Skalli as Ali
- Mark Wing-Davey as Malcolm
- Christopher Malcolm as Justin
- Miranda Forbes as woman in car
- Hugh Ross as judge
- Helena McCarthy as old woman
- Wolf Christian as fireman
- Jane Galloway as 1950s nurse
- Mari Mackenzie as dancer
- Mia Soteriou as guitar player
- Suzy Aitchison as 1970s nurse

=== Special guest stars ===
- Mandy Rice-Davies as 'Patsy'
- Helena Bonham Carter as 'Saffy'
- Richard E. Grant as 'Justin'
- Suzi Quatro as 'Nurse'
- Germaine Greer as 'Mother'
- Sylvia Anderson as voice of Lady Penelope
- John Wells as Uncle Humphrey
- Britt Ekland as herself
- Lulu as herself
- Zandra Rhodes as herself
- Jo Brand as Carmen
- Meera Syal as Suzy
- Adrian Edmondson as Hamish
- Miranda Richardson as Bettina
- Patrick Barlow as Max
- Eleanor Bron as Patsy's mother
- Philip Franks as poet

== Episodes ==
No. overall	No. in series	Title	Directed by	Written by	Original release date	Prod. code
7	1	"Hospital"	Bob Spiers	Jennifer Saunders	27 January 1994	LLVS602K
Patsy becomes the subject of a tabloid sex scandal due to her affair with a married MP. Edina checks into a hospital for surgery after injuring her big toe. Patsy tags along, planning to undergo a chemical peel in preparation for her interview with Hello! magazine. While anesthetised, Edina dreams that she is on her deathbed, surrounded by idealised versions of family members and friends, while Patsy envisions herself looking young for her Hello! spread. Edina awakens to find that her pains were caused by a stray acupuncture needle that worked its way from her cranium to her toe. Meanwhile, a botched facelift leaves Patsy's face covered in burns. The Hello! spread is also a disaster, with the article reporting Patsy's age as 49, blaming her for the sex scandal and revealing her horrific facelift.
8	2	"Death"	Bob Spiers	Jennifer Saunders	3 February 1994	LLVS606L
When Edina's father dies, a grief-stricken Saffron is horrified by her mother's apathy. However, once she realises her own mortality, Edina decides to buy expensive artwork, which she plans to leave behind when she dies. Marshall stops by with his new grief counsellor girlfriend, Sondra, who panics upon discovering that the corpse is to be placed in Edina's living room for the wake. Despite being banned by Saffron from attending the funeral, Edina arrives anyway with Patsy in tow. At the cemetery, Edina stumbles drunkenly into her father's grave and Patsy falls into another open grave nearby. No one offers to help as the two struggle to climb out.
9	3	"Morocco"	Bob Spiers	Jennifer Saunders	10 February 1994	LLVS605S
Edina and Patsy travel to Marrakesh for a photo shoot. They are accompanied by Saffron, who is interested in studying the local indigenous peoples for school. There, Edina and Patsy meet with an old friend, Humphrey, who sexually harasses Saffron. At dinner, it is revealed that in the 1970s, Patsy spent a year living as a man until "it fell off", according to Edina. The following day, during a shopping trip to an outdoor bazaar, a spiteful Patsy sells Saffron to white slavers. Edina and Patsy later go to the photo shoot location, but when no one shows up, they end up lost in the desert. After wandering around for a day or two, the pair are rescued as they run into a burqa-clad Saffron. They spend the last few days of their trip drugged and unconscious, while it is implied that Saffron had a secret dalliance with Humphrey's houseboy.
10	4	"New Best Friend"	Bob Spiers	Jennifer Saunders	24 February 1994	LLVS604Y
Edina frantically organises her cluttered house in order to host old friends Bettina and Max, who were once obsessed with minimalism. Feeling ignored by Edina, Patsy leaves in search of another lunch partner. When Bettina and Max arrive, Edina is disappointed to learn that they are now the hysterical, neurotic parents of a newborn baby. As the couple wreak havoc, Edina covertly leaves the house. At a restaurant, Edina and Patsy compete against each other by attempting to befriend famous people: Patsy invites herself to lunch with Britt Ekland and Zandra Rhodes, while Edina forces her client Lulu to have lunch with her. Both lunches end awkwardly. Back home, while Saffron and Mother comfort Bettina, they hear Edina and Max having sex over the baby monitor. After the couple finally leave—the intended result of Edina's liaison—she and Patsy make peace.
11	5	"Poor"	Bob Spiers	Jennifer Saunders	3 March 1994	LLVS601R
Edina discovers that both Marshall and Justin have cut off their alimony payments. After Saffron conspires with Edina's accountant, Edina is led to believe that she is poor, and reluctantly agrees to reduce her expenses. However, during a trip to the supermarket, she and Patsy fill three trolleys with groceries and steal a crate of champagne. Edina's "smaller" Alfa Romeo car is impounded outside Harvey Nichols, and the pair are later arrested for driving under the influence and several other charges, including assault and shoplifting. On the day of the trial, Edina goes on a rant in an effort to justify her actions, to no avail. In addition to a large fine, she and Patsy are sentenced to community service in a nursing home.
12	6	"Birth"	Bob Spiers	Jennifer Saunders	10 March 1994	LLVS603E
Patsy accidentally burns down the Monsoons' kitchen with a lit cigarette. She and Edina later plan a night out, but they decide to stay home after learning that Saffron is expecting a date, much to her chagrin. To make matters worse, Mother inadvertently locks the three women in the living room on her way to the chemist's. Edina pesters a mortified Saffron with questions about her sex life, before the trio exchange stories about their own births. Patsy—who had a neglectful mother—expresses her resentment towards Saffron due to the privileges she enjoyed while growing up, leading to a bitter dispute between the two. When Mother eventually returns home and unlocks the door, Edina and Patsy quickly leave, while Saffron's date is waiting outside. A flashback sequence shows Edina as she plans to surrender Saffron for adoption.

== Accolades ==
Award	Year	Category	Recipient(s)	Result
International Emmy Awards	1994	Popular Arts (for "Hospital")	Absolutely Fabulous	Won (Note: Tied with Red Dwarf)
British Comedy Awards	1994	Best TV Comedy Actress	Jennifer Saunders	Nominated
British Comedy Awards	1994	Best BBC Sitcom	Absolutely Fabulous	Nominated
British Academy Television Awards	1995	Best Comedy (Programme or Series)	Jon Plowman, Bob Spiers and Jennifer Saunders	Nominated
British Academy Television Awards	1995	Best Comedy Performance	Joanna Lumley	Won
CableACE Awards	1995	International Dramatic or Comedy Special or Series/Movie or Miniseries	Jon Plowman	Nominated

== Home media ==
=== VHS ===
- "Series 2" – volume 1 ("Hospital"/"Death"/"Morocco") – 19 October 1994
- "Series 2" – volume 2 ("New Best Friend"/"Poor"/"Birth") – 19 October 1994
- "The Complete Series 2" – 3 June 1996
- As part of the "Series 1–3" VHS set (6-VHS set)
- As part of the "Series 1–4" VHS set – 25 November 2002 (8-VHS set)
- "The Complete Series 2" re-release – 25 November 2002

=== DVD ===
United Kingdom

- "The Complete Series 2" – 1 October 2001
- As part of the "Series 1–4" DVD set – 25 November 2002 (5-disc set)
- As part of the "Absolutely Everything" DVD set – 15 November 2010 (10-disc set includes series 1–5 and specials)
- As part of "Absolutely Everything: Definitive Edition" – 17 March 2014 (11-disc set includes series 1–5, specials and 20th Anniversary specials)

United States

- "The Complete Series 2" – 13 March 2001
- "The Complete Series 2" (re-release) – 13 September 2005
- As part of the "Series 1–3" DVD set – 13 March 2001 (4-disc set)
- As part of the "Series 1–3" DVD set re-release – 4 October 2005 (4-disc set)
- As part of the "Absolutely Everything" DVD set – 27 May 2008 (9-disc set includes series 1–5 & specials)
- As part of the "Absolutely All of It!" DVD set – 5 November 2013 (10-disc set includes series 1–5, specials and 20th Anniversary specials)

Australia

- "The Complete Series 2" – 28 February 2002
- As part of the "Absolutely Everything" DVD set – 20 April 2006 (9-disc set includes series 1–5 and specials; excluding "The Last Shout")
- As part of the "Complete Collection" DVD set – 5 April 2011 (10-disc set includes series 1–5 and specials)
- As part of "Absolutely Everything: Definitive Edition" – 30 April 2014 (11-disc set includes series 1–5, specials and 20th Anniversary specials)
