= Absolutely Fabulous series 3 =

Absolutely Fabulous
- Series 3
- UK DVD cover
- Starring: Jennifer Saunders; Joanna Lumley; Julia Sawalha; Jane Horrocks; June Whitfield
- No. of episodes: 6 (+ 2-part special)

Release
- Original network: BBC One
- Original release: 30 March – 11 May 1995

Series chronology
- ← Previous; Series 2 Next → Series 4

The third series of the British television sitcom Absolutely Fabulous premiered on BBC One on 30 March 1995 and concluded on 11 May 1995, consisting of six episodes. The third series was originally intended to be the final series of Absolutely Fabulous. However, the following year, Jennifer Saunders decided to write a two-part special titled "The Last Shout", serving as an official finale to the third series. The series was later revived five years later in 2001.

Guest stars for this series include Rebecca Front, Kate O'Mara, Celia Imrie, Naomi Campbell, Helen Lederer, Kathy Burke and Ruby Wax.

== Cast and characters ==
=== Main ===
- Jennifer Saunders as Edina Monsoon
- Joanna Lumley as Patsy Stone
- Julia Sawalha as Saffron Monsoon
- Jane Horrocks as Bubble
- June Whitfield as Mother

=== Recurring ===
- Naoko Mori as Sarah
- Caroline Waldron as Caroline
- Lulu as herself
- Kathy Burke as Magda

=== Guest ===
- Kate O'Mara as Jackie
- Christopher Malcolm as Justin
- Gary Beadle as Oliver
- Christopher Ryan as Marshall
- Rebecca Front as Cherysh
- James Dreyfus as Christopher
- Ian Gelder as David
- Idris Elba as Hilton
- Andrew Loudon as Geoff
- Lee Walters as boy 1
- Ben Soamers as boy 2
- Damien Hunt as Serge
- Stewart Piper as Serge
- Corran Royal as Serge
- Celia Imrie as Claudia Bing
- Naomi Campbell as herself
- Simon Stokes as Gerard
- Paul Reynold as Squeak
- Peter Richardson as Tony
- Joanna Bowen as journalist
- Helen Lederer as Catriona
- Harriet Thorpe as Fleur
- John Hudson as lecturer
- David Cardy as candid cameraman
- Louis Hillier as candid cameraman
- Kevin Allen as Ben
- Mossie Smith as Diane
- Ruby Wax as Candy
- Suzanne Bertish as Gina
- Sean Chapman as Santé
- Mo Gaffney as Bo
- Josie Lawrence as cable TV presenter
- Max Brandt as Mitchell Friedman
- Drew Elliot as Justice of the Peace
- C.G. Varesko as New York transvestite
- Raven Oh as New York transvestite
- Andre Shoals as New York transvestite
- Rupert Penry-Jones as boy at party
- Daniela Denby-Ashe as Saffy's daughter
- Danny Newman as Saffy's son

=== "The Last Shout" guest cast ===
- Tom Hollander as Paolo
- Christopher Malcolm as Justin
- Mo Gaffney as Bo
- Helen Lederer as Catriona
- Marianne Faithfull as God
- Marcella Detroit as Angel
- P. P. Arnold as herself
- Sue Lawley as herself (voice)
- Christopher Ryan as Marshall
- Carmen du Sautoy as Kalishia
- Alan Talbot as Carlo
- Dora Bryan as Millie
- Ed Devereaux as Mac
- Gary Beadle as Oliver
- Kathy Burke as Magda
- Harriet Thorpe as Fleur
- Naoko Mori as Sarah
- Candida Gubbins as shop assistant
- Georgina Grenville as Gucci girl
- Connor Burrowes as choirboy
- Calum MacLeod as vicar
- Nicky Clarke as himself
- Suzy Menkes as herself
- Christian Lacroix as himself
- Bruce Oldfield as himself
- Christopher Biggins as himself

== Episodes ==
No. overall	No. in series	Title	Directed by	Written by	Original release date
13	1	"Door Handle"	Bob Spiers	Jennifer Saunders	30 March 1995
Saffron grows impatient with Edina's unwillingness to have their kitchen remodelled after Patsy accidentally burnt it down. (Note: As depicted in the series 2 episode "Birth") Edina's obsession with finding a particular door handle for the kitchen leads her and Patsy to New York City. After a shopping spree, Patsy persuades Edina to have her navel pierced. Edina finally finds and photographs the door handle at the Four Seasons Hotel. Upon returning home, Edina not only fails to notice that Saffron has had the kitchen refurbished in her absence, but learns that she has forgotten her daughter's birthday.
14	2	"Happy New Year"	Bob Spiers	Jennifer Saunders	6 April 1995
As Edina and Patsy prepare to attend an underground rave on New Year's Eve, they receive an unexpected visit from Patsy's long-lost older sister, Jackie. Patsy insists on taking Jackie along to the party, much to Edina's dismay. However, Patsy is disappointed to learn that Jackie is no longer the jet-setting, drug-addled party animal she used to be. Now homeless, Jackie asks Patsy if she could stay with Edina until she can raise money to open a shelter for stray cats and dogs. After helping Jackie loot Edina's bedroom for valuables she can sell to raise money, Patsy throws her out of the house, but it is too late to go the party; a frustrated Edina has fallen asleep in the sitting room, surrounded by her family as the clock strikes midnight.
15	3	"Sex"	Bob Spiers	Jennifer Saunders	20 April 1995
Patsy convinces Edina to hire two male prostitutes (through Edina's hairdresser Christopher) for an orgy on the night of Saffron's university presentation. However, Edina is unable to loosen up, and the prostitutes are not particularly enthused, either. Patsy attempts to enliven the mood by playing a video of an orgy she and Edina attended in their youth, only to find that it has been accidentally switched with a tape of Saffron's school project. Fearing the worst, Edina and Patsy—accompanied by Mother, Christopher and his drag-queen boyfriend—rush over to the university, but not soon enough to prevent a mortified Saffron and her classmates from watching the orgy tape, which shows couples having sex while Edina is asleep.
16	4	"Jealous"	Bob Spiers	Jennifer Saunders	27 April 1995
Edina becomes frustrated when she loses a prestigious PR award to rival Claudia Bing, despite having bribed the judges. Worried about her dwindling career, Edina works on a campaign in hopes of upstaging Claudia. Meanwhile, Saffron becomes romantically involved with Gerard, her psychology lecturer, until she discovers that he is married with children. In a rare occurrence, Edina comes to Saffron's aid by punching Gerard in the face. At an industry luncheon, Edina's speech is stolen, prompting a drunken rant against the bastardisation of the PR industry, which proves a success. When Edina and Patsy attempt to retrieve the speech, the duo awaken the next morning on a trash barge headed for Ostend.
17	5	"Fear"	Bob Spiers	Jennifer Saunders	4 May 1995
Edina has been feeling helpless after Saffron leaves home to attend university. Patsy loses her job when Ella magazine folds; she later receives an offer to work with her colleague Magda at a New York magazine. Edina and Patsy commiserate drunkenly with each other over old age and the sudden changes in their lives. Saffron returns for a visit, appalled at their behaviour. When Edina announces plans to sell the house before embarking on a journey of self-discovery, a livid Saffron storms off. Edina's plans also mean that she is cutting off Patsy. Embittered, Patsy leaves as she decides to take the job in New York.
18	6	"The End"	Bob Spiers	Jennifer Saunders	11 May 1995
Edina joins a New Age commune, but she struggles to fit in and quickly becomes bored. Patsy finds herself disillusioned with her new job in New York due to creative differences with her co-workers. Saffron settles into university life and Mother spends her days at the Monsoon house, drinking champagne and ordering items from the shopping channel. After realising that their lives are not the same without each other, Edina and Patsy happily reunite on top of Carnegie Hall Tower before returning to London. Back home, Mother has been arrested for squatting and credit card fraud. A flashforward to 25 years into the future provides a glimpse into the lives of Edina, Patsy, Saffron and Mother.
Specials
19	-	"The Last Shout, Parts 1 & 2"	Bob Spiers	Jennifer Saunders	6 November 1996
20	-	"The Last Shout, Parts 1 & 2"	Bob Spiers	Jennifer Saunders	7 November 1996
Saffron accepts a marriage proposal from Paolo, her pompous, controlling Italian boyfriend. Edina and Patsy travel to a ski resort in Val-d'Isère, France, but they are disappointed by the lack of celebrities in town. Later, a drunken altercation ensues when Edina points out their constant dependency on each other, destroying their chalet in the process. The next day, Edina loses control while skiing and nearly falls over a cliff. In a near-death experience, God—in the guise of Marianne Faithfull—appears to Edina in heaven, informing her that it is not her time yet. Meanwhile, in London, Mother is brought home by a disguised Bo—who is hiding from Scientologists—after being mistaken for a terrorist at the airport, and realises she has forgotten to collect her American friends, Mac and Millie. Edina and Patsy return home from Val-d'Isère. Upon discovering that Paolo's parents are wealthy and famous, Edina takes a sudden interest in Saffron's upcoming wedding. When Paolo's parents come to visit, his mother, Kalishia, disapproves of Saffron and forbids Paolo to marry her. Patsy blackmails Kalishia into changing her mind by reminding her that they once co-starred in a Bond-inspired pornographic film. On the wedding day, Edina replaces Saffron's bridesmaid, Sarah, with Georgina, a Gucci model. When the vicar asks if there are any objections, Edina has another vision of God, who opposes the marriage. Edina interrupts the ceremony, prompting the guests to leave, while Paolo departs with Georgina. Though initially devastated, Saffron ultimately admits that Paolo was not right for her, before Edina and Patsy reveal that they are going on her honeymoon trip in her place.

== Accolades ==
Award	Year	Category	Recipient(s)	Result
British Academy Television Awards	1996	Best Comedy (Programme or Series)	Jon Plowman, Bob Spiers and Jennifer Saunders	Nominated
British Academy Television Awards	1996	Best Comedy Performance	Joanna Lumley	Nominated
National Television Awards	1996	Most Popular Comedy Series	Absolutely Fabulous	Nominated
British Academy Television Awards	1997	Best Comedy (Programme or Series) (for "The Last Shout")	Jon Plowman, Bob Spiers and Jennifer Saunders	Nominated
British Academy Television Awards	1997	Best Comedy Performance (for "The Last Shout")	Joanna Lumley	Nominated

== Home media ==
VHS (United Kingdom)

- Series 3 – Volume 1: "Doorhandle" / "Happy New Year" / "Sex" – 2 October 1995
- Series 3 – Volume 2: "Jealous" / "Fear" / "The End" – 2 October 1995
- The Complete Series 3 – 25 November 2002
- As part of the "Series 1-3" (6-VHS set) – 24 January 2000
- As part of the "Series 1-4" (8-VHS set) – 25 November 2002

DVD (Region 1)

- "Complete Series 3" – 13 March 2001
  - "Complete Series 3" re-release – 13 September 2005
- As part of "Complete Series 1–3" (4-disc set) – 13 March 2001
  - As part of "Complete Series 1–3" re-release (4-disc set) – 4 October 2005
- As part of "Absolutely Fabulous: Absolutely All of It!" (9-disc set) – 27 May 2008
- As Part of the "Absolutely Fabulous: Absolutely All of It!" DVD set - 5 November 2013 (10-disc set includes Series 1-5, specials & 20th Anniversary Specials)

DVD (Region 2)

- "Series 3" – 12 November 2001
- As part of "Series 1–4" (5-disc set) – 25 November 2002
- As part of "Absolutely Fabulous: Absolutely Everything" (10-disc set) – 15 November 2010
- As part of "Absolutely Fabulous: Absolutely Everything - The Definitive Edition" (11-disc set) – 17 March 2014

DVD (Region 4)

- "Series 3" – 1 July 2002
- As part of "Absolutely Fabulous: Absolutely Everything" (9-disc set) – 20 April 2006
- As part of "Absolutely Fabulous: Complete Collection" (10-disc set) – 5 April 2011
- As Part of the "Absolutely Everything: Definitive Edition" (11-disc set) – 30 April 2014

The Last Shout

- United States
  - DVD as part of "Absolutely Fabulous: Absolutely Special" – 30 September 2003 (includes 2002 special "Gay")
  - DVD as part of "Absolutely Fabulous: Absolutely Special" re-release – 8 May 2007 (Includes 2002 special "Gay)
  - DVD as part of "Absolutely Fabulous: Absolutely All of It!" – 5 November 2013
- United Kingdom
  - VHS – 11 November 1996
  - VHS re-release – 1 October 1999
  - DVD – 27 November 2000
  - DVD as part of Absolutely Fabulous: Absolutely Everything – 15 November 2010
  - DVD as part of "Absolutely Fabulous: Absolutely Everything - The Definitive Edition" – 17 March 2014
- Australia
  - DVD – 20 July 2002
  - DVD as part of "Absolutely Fabulous: Absolutely Everything" – 20 April 2006
  - DVD as part of "Absolutely Fabulous: Complete Collection – 5 April 2011
  - DVD as part of "Absolutely Fabulous: Absolutely Everything - The Definitive Edition" – 30 April 2014

== Other media ==
Prior to the third series, a dramatized behind-the-scenes special was broadcast on 6 January 1995. The special was titled 'How to Be Absolutely Fabulous' and featured Jennifer Saunders as she enters the BBC studio in which the woman at reception is unaware of who Saunders is. Unable to convince the receptionist that she is in fact Edina for the series, Saunders, along with the camera crew runs up to the Absolutely Fabulous office, despite being refused access from the receptions. Once in the office, Saunders talks about the origins of the series. The special features clips from the series.

A second special, released in 1998 and titled 'Absolutely Fabulous: A Life' features Edina and her mother as she and a camera crew are filming the story of Edina's life in a documentary. The setting for the documentary is in the charity shop in which her mother works. Edina talks about her surroundings in the charity shop, a setting that she is unaccustomed to and certainly is not to her taste. She also reminisces about her life. The special features clips from the series.

Both specials were featured outside of the actual series and are not included or counted as episodes.
