= Absolutely Fabulous (disambiguation) =

Absolutely Fabulous (originally titled Ab Fab) is a British television sitcom.

Absolutely Fabulous may also refer to:

- "Absolutely Fabulous" (song), a 1994 song by English duo Pet Shop Boys
- Absolutely Fabulous: The Movie, a 2016 British comedy film based on the television show
- Absolutely Fabulous (2001 film) (French: Absolument fabuleux), a 2001 French comedy film based on the television show
- Absolutely Fabulous: 20th Anniversary, a set of three special episodes of the television series
