= Absolutely Fabulous series 4 =

Season of television series

Absolutely Fabulous
- Series 4
- UK DVD cover
- Starring: Jennifer Saunders; Joanna Lumley; Julia Sawalha; Jane Horrocks; June Whitfield
- No. of episodes: 6 (+ Christmas special)

Release
- Original network: BBC One
- Original release: 31 August – 5 October 2001

Series chronology
- ← Previous; Series 3 Next → Series 5

The fourth series of British television sitcom Absolutely Fabulous premiered on BBC One on 31 August 2001 and concluded on 5 October 2001, consisting of six episodes. Originally, Absolutely Fabulous was to end with the third series, then two-part special "The Last Shout" was created to serve as an official finale to the series. However, in 2000, Jennifer Saunders created and wrote a television pilot for a proposed new series, Mirrorball, in which she intended to reunite the cast of Absolutely Fabulous in new roles and a different plot. Saunders, along with Joanna Lumley, Julia Sawalha, Jane Horrocks and June Whitfield, returned for the pilot, but the series was never commissioned. Nevertheless, Mirrorball inspired Saunders to revive Absolutely Fabulous and a fourth series was produced. A Christmas special, "Gay" (titled "Absolutely Fabulous in New York" in the United States), was produced following the fourth series and was broadcast in 2002.

== Cast and characters ==
=== Main ===
- Jennifer Saunders as Edina Monsoon
- Joanna Lumley as Patsy Stone
- Julia Sawalha as Saffron Monsoon
- Jane Horrocks as Bubble / Katy Grin
- June Whitfield as Mother

=== Recurring ===
- Twiggy as herself
- Antony Cotton as Damon
- Naoko Mori as Sarah
- Tilly Blackwood as Lady Candida de Denison-Bender
- Helen Lederer as Catriona
- Harriet Thorpe as Fleur
- Mo Gaffney as Bo
- Christopher Ryan as Marshall
- Lady Victoria Hervey as herself

=== Guest ===
- Bob Barrett as Labour Party man
- Stephen Gately as himself
- Michael Greco as himself
- Judy Finnigan as herself
- Richard Madeley as himself
- Dora Bryan as Dolly
- Tim Wylton as Brice
- Crispin Bonham-Carter as Jago Balfour
- Dave Gorman as Rimmer
- Erin O'Connor as herself
- Annegret Tree as herself
- Daphne Selfe as herself
- Pascal Liger as sleazy man
- Sacha Distel as himself
- Christian Lacroix as himself
- Robin Cope as fitness instructor
- Julian Rhind-Tutt as Taylor
- Andrea Gillie as Patsy's secretary
- Jessica Willcocks as Minge
- Marianne Faithfull as God
- Anita Pallenberg as Devil
- Lill Roughley as Jude
- Miles Western as Martin
- Emma Pierson as Kasha
- Josh Neale as Josh
- Melanie Jessop as police woman
- Ashley Clish as Saffron as child
- Christopher Malcolm as Justin
- Celia Imrie as Claudia Bing
- Jeillo Edwards as herself
- Joanna Bowen as JoBo
- Ruby Wax as Beth Dunnwoody
- Leigh Lawson as himself
- Dale Winton as himself

=== "Gay" guest cast ===
- Christopher Ryan as Marshall
- Mo Gaffney as Bo
- Harriet Thorpe as Fleur
- Helen Lederer as Catriona
- Josh Hamilton as Serge
- Danny Burstein as Martin
- Nathan Lee Graham as assistant at "GUFF"
- Whoopi Goldberg as Goldie
- Debbie Harry as herself
- Graham Norton as himself
- Jared Gold as himself
- Rufus Wainwright as himself
- Alan Hobson as check-in agent (uncredited)
- Jesse Tyler Ferguson as party guest (uncredited)

== Episodes ==
No. overall	No. in series	Title	Directed by	Written by	Original release date	UK viewers (millions)
21	1	"Parralox"	Bob Spiers	Jennifer Saunders	31 August 2001	8.28
Edina, who now runs a television production company, is slated to make a guest appearance with client Twiggy on Richard and Judy's morning television show. Patsy has been injecting her face with Parralox, a Botox-like substance, in order to freeze her wrinkles. Edina is persuaded by Patsy to try Parralox as well, but she awakens the next morning with a paralysed face. In addition to costing Saffron a government job, Edina is replaced by Katy Grin, her new business partner and Bubble's cousin, for the television appearance.
22	2	"Fish Farm"	Christine Gernon	Jennifer Saunders	7 September 2001	7.59
When Saffron hires a handsome landscape gardener to redesign the backyard, Patsy recognises him as Jago Balfour, the younger brother of a wealthy acquaintance of hers, who inherited a country estate before dying of an overdose. Presuming Jago to be rich as well, Patsy goads Edina into seducing him. Edina and Jago soon arrange a dinner date, which eventually leads to a night of sex. The next morning, Jago reveals that his brother squandered the family fortune on drugs, forcing him to sell the estate to Roger Daltrey as a fish farm, much to the horror of Edina and Patsy.
23	3	"Paris"	Bob Spiers	Jennifer Saunders	14 September 2001	7.47
Patsy is excited to be joining young supermodel Erin O'Connor for a magazine photo shoot in Paris. Edina drags a reluctant Saffron to Paris for a mother–daughter fashion spread. After learning that other models from her generation will also appear in the shoot, Patsy becomes competitive and constantly ignores the photographer's directions, much to his annoyance. Meanwhile, Edina and Saffron spend an unusually pleasant day together in Paris, going shopping and dining at upscale restaurants. Edina later encourages Saffron to flash her breasts from the top of the Eiffel Tower. However, Edina's ulterior motive is revealed when a photographer appears unexpectedly and takes a topless picture of Saffron for a magazine. Note: Following the 11 September terrorist attacks in New York City, a joke about the Taliban was edited out of the original BBC broadcast of this episode, but it is included on the DVD release.
24	4	"Donkey"	Bob Spiers	Jennifer Saunders	21 September 2001	7.34
Edina enrolls in a boot-camp fitness programme and subjects herself to a strict diet, after being ridiculed for her weight by Katy Grin, Catriona and Fleur. Meanwhile, Patsy briefly experiments with pulling back her signature fringe for the first time in decades, and budding playwright Saffron receives a visit from Taylor, a pretentious old school friend with acting aspirations. Despite initially struggling, Edina's efforts soon pay off as she realises she has lost one stone. Proudly displaying her slimmer figure, Edina meets her friends again for lunch, but her weight loss is still not enough to deter Katy Grin's snide remarks.
25	5	"Small Opening"	Christine Gernon	Jennifer Saunders	28 September 2001	7.44
Saffron's first play, Self-Raising Flower, which details her troubled relationship with Edina, is due to open in a local theatre. Worried about being portrayed in a negative light, Edina unsuccessfully attempts to sabotage the play. As the rest of the family gather for the opening night, Saffron decides to invite Edina, who reluctantly attends with Patsy. The two are surprisingly amused by the play—despite the fact that Patsy is played by a man. The play becomes a roaring success due to being perceived by the cast and audience as a comedy, as opposed to the tragedy Saffron had intended.
26	6	"Menopause"	Christine Gernon	Jennifer Saunders	5 October 2001	6.64
Bubble accidentally emails Edina's clients' details to nemesis Claudia Bing, who poaches most of Edina's clients, including Twiggy. Patsy—who has recently been diagnosed with osteoporosis—and Edina are horrified when Saffron forces them to attend a Menopausals Anonymous meeting organised by her. In order to save her business, Edina dupes Claudia into buying her TV company—which currently has no programmes—while Claudia also agrees to return several high-profile clients. Saffron has a terrifying nightmare in which Patsy threatens to impregnate herself with a vial of Mick Jagger's sperm unless she is allowed to move into the spare room.
Christmas Special (2002)
27	-	"Gay" (Note: Alternatively titled "Absolutely Fabulous in New York" in the United States.)	Tristram Shapeero	Jennifer Saunders	27 December 2002	8.68
Upon discovering that Serge is gay and living in New York, Edina is thrilled to reunite with her long-lost son as she plans a trip to New York Fashion Week with Patsy, despite Saffron's objections. In exchange for Serge's contact information, Edina and Patsy are forced to get married by a counsellor at an LGBT drop-in centre where Serge volunteers. Edina finally locates Serge, who works in a second-hand bookstore and, to her surprise, is essentially the male equivalent of Saffron. Despite initially rebuffing Edina's attempts to reconnect due to unresolved issues, Serge is convinced by his flamboyant boyfriend, Martin, to spend the day with her. Edina, Patsy, Serge and Martin attend Fashion Week and later go on a bar crawl. The night ends with Edina and Patsy getting arrested after accidentally setting a bar on fire. The pair return home after Saffron posts bail, and Edina reveals that she has disowned Serge in favour of Martin, whom she has "adopted".

== Home media ==
VHS (United States)

- "Series 4: Part 1" – 5 February 2002
- "Series 4: Part 2" – 5 February 2002

VHS (United Kingdom)

- "Series 4" – 19 November 2001
- As part of the "Series 1-4" (8-VHS set) – 25 November 2002

DVD (Region 1)

- "Series 4" (2-disc set) – 5 February 2002
  - "Complete Series 4" re-release (2-disc set) – 13 September 2005
- As part of "Absolutely Fabulous: Absolutely Everything" (9-disc set) – 27 May 2008
- As Part of the "Absolutely Fabulous: Absolutely All of It!" (10-disc set) - 5 November 2013

DVD (Region 2)

- "Series 4" (2-disc set) – 8 April 2002
- As part of "Series 1–4" (5-disc set) – 25 November 2002
- As part of "Absolutely Fabulous: Absolutely Everything" (10-disc set) – 15 November 2010
- As part of "Absolutely Fabulous: Absolutely Everything - The Definitive Edition" (11-disc set) – 17 March 2014

DVD (Region 4)

- "Series 4" (2-disc set) – 8 August 2002
- As part of "Absolutely Fabulous: Absolutely Everything" (9-disc set) – 20 April 2006
- As part of "Absolutely Fabulous: Complete Collection" (10-disc set) – 5 April 2011
- As Part of the "Absolutely Everything: Definitive Edition" (11-disc set) – 30 April 2014

'Gay' special

- United States
  - DVD as part of "Absolutely Fabulous: Absolutely Special" – 30 September 2003 (includes 'The Last Shout')
  - DVD as part of "Absolutely Fabulous: Absolutely Special" re-release – 13 September 2005 (includes 'The Last Shout')
  - DVD as part of "Absolutely Fabulous: Absolutely Everything – 27 May 2008
  - DVD as part of "Absolutely Fabulous: Absolutely All of It! – 5 November 2013
- United Kingdom
  - DVD - 29 September 2003
  - DVD as part of "Absolutely Fabulous: Absolutely Everything" – 15 November 2010
  - DVD as part of "Absolutely Fabulous: Absolutely Everything - The Definitive Edition" – 17 March 2014
- Australia
  - DVD as part of "Series 5" – 8 April 2004
  - DVD as part of "Absolutely Fabulous: Absolutely Everything" – 20 April 2006
  - DVD as part of "Absolutely Fabulous: Complete Collection" – 5 April 2011
  - DVD as part of "Absolutely Everything: Definitive Edition" – 30 April 2014

== See also ==
- Mirrorball – 2000 television pilot
