= Juliette Mole =

English actress

- Born: 1955 (age 70–71)
- Occupations: Actress, artist
- Years active: 1981–present
- Children: 2

Juliette Mole (born 1955) is an English actress and artist based in London.

== Early life ==
She began her career with the Royal Shakespeare Company and later appeared on television and in film.

== Career ==
Mole appeared as a singer in a West End production of Francis Beaumont's The Knight of the Burning Pestle at the Aldwych Theatre in 1981. The same year, she was understudy to Peggy Ashcroft as the Countess in Trevor Nunn's Royal Shakespeare Company production of All's Well That Ends Well, and had some lesser roles for the company.

In 1983, she played Bella in the Avon Touring Theatre Company's first production of Vince Foxall's Brittle Glory, a reworking of Richard II.

Mole's first credited screen role was in the first episode of the television drama The Fourth Arm (1983), in which she played a WAAF. She went on to appear in Screen Two, the Miss Marple film 4:50 from Paddington (1987), with Joan Hickson as Marple, in Agatha Christie's Poirot with David Suchet, Rumpole of the Bailey, and Absolutely Fabulous. In The Chief, she played Marie-Pierre Arnoux from 1993 to 1994.

== Art ==
In the 1990s, she lived on a houseboat on the River Thames, where she was reported to keep collections of black and white photographs and hats. Her interest in art developed into a new career as an artist, and she now specializes in trompe-l'œil and garden design.

== Filmography ==
- The Fourth Arm (1983) – WAAF
- Screen Two (episode Honest, Decent and True, 1986) – Davina Fraser
- 4:50 from Paddington (1987) – Anna Stravinska
- Agatha Christie's Poirot, Murder in the Mews (1989) – Jane Plenderleith
- Crossing to Freedom (1990) – Mademoiselle Tenois
- Rumpole of the Bailey (episode Rumpole and the Eternal Triangle, 1992) – Hilary Peek Q.C.
- Absolutely Fabulous (episode France, 1992) – Air Hostess
- All or Nothing at All (1993) – Kilpatrick
- The Chief (1993–1994) – Marie-Pierre Arnoux
- Salut Serge (1997) - Pascal
