= Modern Mother and Daughter =

Comedy sketch

- Writers: Dawn French; Jennifer Saunders
- Actors: Dawn French; Jennifer Saunders
- First appearance: French and Saunders (19 April 1990)
- Basis: Absolutely Fabulous (1992-2012)

"Modern Mother and Daughter" is a sketch from the third series of French and Saunders, written by and starring Dawn French and Jennifer Saunders. The sketch later served as the basis of Saunders' sitcom Absolutely Fabulous in 1992.

== Plot ==
Saffron is an ordinary teenager, busy completing her homework in her bedroom one evening. Her mother, Adriana, enters, dressed in a brightly-printed kaftan, with an acid house-inspired outfit underneath. Adriana tries several times to persuade Saffron to join her party downstairs, inviting her to "share a joint" with her and her guests, to Saffron's disapproval.

Adriana continues her attention-seeking questioning, disrupting her daughter's attempts to complete her homework. She questions Saffron's university plans – studying physics in Aberdeen, her reluctance to join her mother on holiday, and her warm relationship with her father. (Adriana, by contrast, has nothing but hostility towards her ex-husband.) The sketch ends with Adriana saying she's "hoping" her boyfriend Jean-Pierre will stay over, to which Saffron hands a pack of condoms to her mother, saying she is aware her mother has run out of them.

== Writing ==
The sketch transposes the traditional roles of mother and daughter, with the daughter behaving and dressing conventionally while the mother rebels. This characterisation and the relationship between the two characters was later carried over into Saunders' sitcom Absolutely Fabulous. In the series, Saunders reprised her role as the mother, renamed Edina, while Julia Sawalha played her role as the daughter, Saffron, replacing French. Lines from the sketch were reused in the series, such as Adriana's insistence that it is possible to be a socialist while employing household staff, and Saffron's nickname from her mother of "Sweetie".
