= Absolutely Fabulous: 20th Anniversary =

- Series 6
- Region 2 DVD cover
- Starring: Jennifer Saunders; Joanna Lumley; Julia Sawalha; Jane Horrocks; June Whitfield
- No. of episodes: 3

Release
- Original network: BBC One
- Original release: 25 December 2011 – 23 July 2012

Absolutely Fabulous: 20th Anniversary (also known as Ab Fab at 20) is a set of three special episodes of the British television sitcom Absolutely Fabulous. It was broadcast on BBC One between 25 December 2011 and 23 July 2012 to commemorate the 20th anniversary of the series, which debuted in 1992.

== Cast and characters ==
=== Main ===
- Jennifer Saunders as Edina Monsoon
- Joanna Lumley as Patsy Stone
- Julia Sawalha as Saffron Monsoon
- Jane Horrocks as Bubble
- June Whitfield as Mother

=== Guest ===
- Christopher Malcolm as Justin
- Lucy Montgomery as Baron
- Naoko Mori as Sarah
- Sofie Gråbøl as Sarah Lund
- Llewella Gideon as beautician
- Harriet Thorpe as Fleur
- Helen Lederer as Catriona
- Rose Johnson as Patsy's intern
- Camille Ucan as Bubble's intern
- Hannah Dodd as Saffy's do gooder
- Femi Oyeniran as agent
- Amy Yamazaki as agent
- Patricia Potter as Royal Albert Hall manager
- Richard Sisson as pianist
- Mo Gaffney as Bo
- Christopher Ryan as Marshall
- Eleanor Thom as Olympic party hostess
- Beattie Edmondson as Olympic party waitress
- James O'Driscoll as blind paralympian

=== Special guests ===
- La Roux as herself
- Emma Bunton as herself
- Lulu as herself
- Kirsty Wark as herself
- Mark Kermode as himself
- Lindsay Duncan as Jeanne Durand
- Kelly Holmes as herself
- Tanni Grey Thompson as herself
- Stella McCartney as herself

== Episodes ==
No. overall	Title	Directed by	Written by	Original release date	UK viewers (millions)
37	"Identity"	Mandie Fletcher	Jennifer Saunders	25 December 2011	9.07
Edina collects Saffron from prison, where she served two years for (unknowingly) providing asylum seekers with forged passports. Saffron later invites a former cellmate, Baron, to the house, but it is soon revealed that Baron was once Patsy's drug dealer and Patsy still owes her £50,000; Baron refuses to leave until the debt is repaid. In order to obtain the money, Saffron convinces Patsy to claim her pension, forcing her to own up to her actual age. Realising she has no official documents, Patsy begins to question her own existence—until Mother presents Patsy's old Post Office savings book. After going to the benefits office with Edina, Patsy finally pays off her debt to Baron.
38	"Job"	Mandie Fletcher	Jennifer Saunders	1 January 2012	7.97
When Saffron berates Edina for being lazy and incompetent, Edina and Patsy decide to impress her by booking her favourite French film star, Jeanne Durand, to perform at the Royal Albert Hall. However, they are dismayed when Jeanne refuses to sing aloud and instead merely mouths the lyrics. As a solution, Jeanne lip-syncs to Bubble's vocals on the night of the concert.
39	"Olympics"	Mandie Fletcher	Jennifer Saunders	23 July 2012	6.38
Edina decides to rent out her house to Michael Douglas during the Summer Olympics, hoping it will lead to prestigious A-list parties, even though Patsy—who now needs incontinence pants—no longer shares Edina's penchant for partying. However, Bo and Marshall arrive instead, after Michael gave the couple his party invitations. Frustrated with her dwindling social life, Edina happens upon one of Michael's invitations, allowing her and Patsy to attend a pre-Olympics party. The pair are eventually escorted out after Edina harasses Stella McCartney. Note: This episode stands as the final episode of Absolutely Fabulous, as it was announced by Jennifer Saunders in 2016 that no more series or specials will be produced, with the 2016 film concluding the franchise.

== International broadcast ==
Absolutely Fabulous: 20th Anniversary was broadcast in the United States simultaneously on BBC America and Logo, and in Australia on ABC1.

No.	Title	Broadcast date		
No.	Title	Logo (U.S.)	BBC America (U.S.)	ABC1 (AUS)
1	Identity	8 January 2012		8 February 2012
2	Job	6 February 2012	12 February 2012	15 February 2012
3	Olympics	25 July 2012		

== Reception ==
=== Ratings ===
Episode	UK viewers		AUS viewers	
Episode	Rating	Rank	Rating	Rank
1	9,070,000	8	654,000	13
2	7,970,000	10	584,000	17
3	6,380,000	8	—N/a	—N/a

=== Critical reception ===
Michael Hogan of The Daily Telegraph gave the specials a negative review; following the "Olympics" episode, he commented, "The special Olympic edition of Absolutely Fabulous [...] would have won no medals for comedy." He added, "This was the last of three 20th anniversary specials, the first pair of which were shown over Christmas. Every single one of those 20 years showed on-screen during this torturous half-hour."

In a more favourable review, Meredith Blake of The A.V. Club stated, "While longtime AbFab fans will enjoy this latest incarnation of the series, which has been reprised multiple times since its official end in 1995, 'Identity' most definitely isn't for AbFab neophytes, who will most likely be confused by the broad performances, the outré costumes, and the disembodied canned laughter."

=== Accolades ===
In 2012, Jennifer Saunders received the BAFTA TV Award for Best Female Comedy Performance for her portrayal as Edina Monsoon following the first two specials.

== Home media ==
The 20th Anniversary specials have been released on DVD, first in the United Kingdom on 30 July 2012, and then in Australia on 16 August 2012, and in the United States on 11 September 2012.

Additionally, the specials are available as part of complete collection sets including "Absolutely Fabulous: Absolutely All of It!", released 5 November 2013 in the United States, and "Absolutely Fabulous: Absolutely Everything − The Definitive Edition", released in both the United Kingdom, on 17 March 2014, and in Australia on 30 April 2014.
