= List of Absolutely Fabulous episodes =

Absolutely Fabulous is a British sitcom, created and written by, and starring Jennifer Saunders, with Joanna Lumley, Julia Sawalha, Jane Horrocks, and June Whitfield. It was produced by Saunders & French Productions and BBC Productions, and initially broadcast a successful first series on BBC2, before moving to BBC One. The series originated from a sketch featured on French and Saunders, which led to a four-year run from 1992 to 1996, followed by a revival from 2001 to 2004, and then a brief return to mark the show's 20th anniversary, from 2011 to 2012.

During the course of the programme, 39 episodes of Absolutely Fabulous aired, including seven specials over five series, between 12 November 1992 and 23 July 2012.

== Series overview ==
Series
Series	Episodes	Originally released		
Series	Episodes	First released	Last released	Network
1	6	12 November 1992	17 December 1992	BBC2
2	6	27 January 1994	10 March 1994	BBC One
3	6	30 March 1995	11 May 1995	BBC One
Specials	2	6 November 1996	7 November 1996	BBC One
4	6	31 August 2001	5 October 2001	BBC One
Special		27 December 2002		BBC One
5	8	17 October 2003	24 December 2003	BBC One
Special		25 December 2004		BBC One
20th Anniversary	3	25 December 2011	23 July 2012	BBC One

== Episode list ==
=== Series 1 (1992) ===
No. overall	No. in series	Title	Directed by	Written by	Original release date	Prod. code
1	1	"Fashion"	Bob Spiers	Jennifer Saunders	12 November 1992	LLCC521X
2	2	"Fat"	Bob Spiers	Jennifer Saunders	19 November 1992	LLVQ731H
3	3	"France" (Note: Alternatively titled "A Week in Provence".)	Bob Spiers	Jennifer Saunders	26 November 1992	LLVQ732B
4	4	"Iso Tank"	Bob Spiers	Jennifer Saunders	3 December 1992	LLVQ733W
5	5	"Birthday"	Bob Spiers	Jennifer Saunders	17 December 1992	LLVQ735J
6	6	"Magazine"	Bob Spiers	Jennifer Saunders	10 December 1992	LLVQ734P

=== Series 2 (1994) ===
No. overall	No. in series	Title	Directed by	Written by	Original release date	Prod. code
7	1	"Hospital"	Bob Spiers	Jennifer Saunders	27 January 1994	LLVS602K
8	2	"Death"	Bob Spiers	Jennifer Saunders	3 February 1994	LLVS606L
9	3	"Morocco"	Bob Spiers	Jennifer Saunders	10 February 1994	LLVS605S
10	4	"New Best Friend"	Bob Spiers	Jennifer Saunders	24 February 1994	LLVS604Y
11	5	"Poor"	Bob Spiers	Jennifer Saunders	3 March 1994	LLVS601R
12	6	"Birth"	Bob Spiers	Jennifer Saunders	10 March 1994	LLVS603E

=== Series 3 (1995) ===
No. overall	No. in series	Title	Directed by	Written by	Original release date
13	1	"Door Handle"	Bob Spiers	Jennifer Saunders	30 March 1995
14	2	"Happy New Year"	Bob Spiers	Jennifer Saunders	6 April 1995
15	3	"Sex"	Bob Spiers	Jennifer Saunders	20 April 1995
16	4	"Jealous"	Bob Spiers	Jennifer Saunders	27 April 1995
17	5	"Fear"	Bob Spiers	Jennifer Saunders	4 May 1995
18	6	"The End"	Bob Spiers	Jennifer Saunders	11 May 1995
Specials
19	-	"The Last Shout, Parts 1 & 2"	Bob Spiers	Jennifer Saunders	6 November 1996
20	-	"The Last Shout, Parts 1 & 2"	Bob Spiers	Jennifer Saunders	7 November 1996

=== Series 4 (2001) ===
No. overall	No. in series	Title	Directed by	Written by	Original release date	UK viewers (millions)
21	1	"Parralox"	Bob Spiers	Jennifer Saunders	31 August 2001	8.28
22	2	"Fish Farm"	Christine Gernon	Jennifer Saunders	7 September 2001	7.59
23	3	"Paris"	Bob Spiers	Jennifer Saunders	14 September 2001	7.47
24	4	"Donkey"	Bob Spiers	Jennifer Saunders	21 September 2001	7.34
25	5	"Small Opening"	Christine Gernon	Jennifer Saunders	28 September 2001	7.44
26	6	"Menopause"	Christine Gernon	Jennifer Saunders	5 October 2001	6.64
Christmas Special (2002)
27	-	"Gay" (Note: Alternatively titled "Absolutely Fabulous in New York" in the United States.)	Tristram Shapeero	Jennifer Saunders	27 December 2002	8.68

=== Series 5 (2003) ===
No. overall	No. in series	Title	Directed by	Written by	Original release date	UK viewers (millions)
28	1	"Cleanin'"	Dewi Humphreys	Jennifer Saunders	17 October 2003	7.69
29	2	"Book Clubbin'"	Dewi Humphreys	Jennifer Saunders	24 October 2003	7.87
30	3	"Panickin'"	Dewi Humphreys	Jennifer Saunders	31 October 2003	6.15
31	4	"Huntin', Shootin' & Fishin'"	Dewi Humphreys	Jennifer Saunders	7 November 2003	7.02
32	5	"Birthin'"	Dewi Humphreys	Jennifer Saunders	14 November 2003	7.19
33	6	"Schmoozin'"	Dewi Humphreys	Jennifer Saunders	28 November 2003	5.22
34	7	"Exploitin'"	Dewi Humphreys	Jennifer Saunders	5 December 2003	5.86
Christmas Special (2003)
35	-	"Cold Turkey" (Note: Alternatively titled "Drinkin'".)	Dewi Humphreys	Jennifer Saunders	24 December 2003	6.91
Christmas Special (2004)
36	-	"White Box"	Ed Bye	Jennifer Saunders	25 December 2004	6.34

=== 20th Anniversary specials (2011–2012) ===
No. overall	Title	Directed by	Written by	Original release date	UK viewers (millions)
37	"Identity"	Mandie Fletcher	Jennifer Saunders	25 December 2011	9.07
38	"Job"	Mandie Fletcher	Jennifer Saunders	1 January 2012	7.97
39	"Olympics"	Mandie Fletcher	Jennifer Saunders	23 July 2012	6.38

== Other media ==
=== How to Be Absolutely Fabulous (1995) ===
Prior to the third series, a dramatized behind-the-scenes special featured Jennifer Saunders as she enters the BBC studio in which the woman at reception is unaware of who Saunders is. Unable to convince the receptionist that she is in fact Edina for the series, Saunders, along with the camera crew runs up to the Absolutely Fabulous office, despite being refused access from the receptionist. Once in the office, Saunders talks about the origins of the series. The special features clips from the series. It was directed by Ron Korb and written by Glenn Eichler. It was broadcast on 6 January 1995.

=== Absolutely Fabulous: A Life (1998) ===
The special features Edina and her mother as she and a camera crew are filming the story of Edina's life in a documentary. The setting for the documentary is in the charity shop in which her mother works. Edina talks about her surroundings in the charity shop, a setting that she is unaccustomed to and certainly is not to her taste. She also reminisces about her life. The special features clips from the series. Directed by Bob Spiers and written by Jennifer Saunders, the special was released to video on 30 October 1998.

=== The Story of Absolutely Fabulous (2004) ===
The special behind-the-scenes documentary gives a definitive account of the history of the series. The documentary was broadcast on 2 January 2004.

=== Comic Relief (2005) ===
A Comic Relief sketch sees Edina and Patsy reluctantly accompany Emma Bunton to the taping of Comic Relief at the BBC Television Centre. Inside, a member of the production staff can't find Emma's name on the list of presenters, prompting Edina to suggest they check again under Queen Noor or Lulu. Emma and Edina bicker in a dressing room when Edina insists that the point of Emma's participation should be to gain greater exposure for herself. Edina urges Emma to lobby director and Comic Relief founder Richard Curtis for a role in one of his films. When Richard visits the dressing room to apologise for Emma having been left off the list, Edina and Patsy fail to recognise him and ask him to fetch Richard straightaway. Emma angrily writes a cheque to the charity and storms off. When the production staffer returns to collect Emma (now scheduled to appear after Graham Norton), Edina and Patsy first conceal (in the dressing room) and then loudly acknowledge (on-stage, live, during the Comic Relief special) Emma's departure. Patsy is struck by stage fright while Edina attempts a song. Once Patsy wets herself, both are quickly shooed from the stage by a horrified Graham. Guest stars include Emma Bunton, Richard Curtis, Graham Norton and Miranda Hart. The Comic Relief special sketch broadcast on 11 March 2005.

=== Sport Relief (2012) ===
A Sport Relief special follows Edina as she is busy training for a Sport Relief charity function with Emma Bunton with disastrous results while Patsy fills in for her downstairs in a meeting with Stella McCartney. Patsy ends up taking the credit for Edina's idea to feature Kate Moss and David Gandy in the magazine, but the only condition is that Patsy must not let Edina anywhere near the shoot. In the gym upstairs, Edina boxes with David Haye and she and Emma end up fighting. Emma punches Edina who ends up getting wheeled through the hotel bar on a stretcher. Guest stars include Llewella Gideon, Kate Moss, Stella McCartney, Emma Bunton, David Gandy, Colin Jackson, Linford Christie and David Haye. The Sport Relief special sketch was broadcast on 23 March 2012.

=== Absolutely Fabulous: Inside Out (2024) ===
A behind-the-scenes special that broadcast on Gold and features Jennifer Saunders, Joanna Lumley, Julia Sawalha and Jane Horrocks. The special was directed by Simon Lloyd and written by The Dawson Bros. and was broadcast on 17 October 2024.
