= Mossie Smith =

British actress

Mossie Smith is a British actress, best known for Come Home, Charlie, and Face Them (1990), Goodnight, Mister Tom (1998), Prime Suspect (1995) and Second Best (1994).

== Filmography ==
- Come Home, Charlie, and Face Them (1990)
- Second Best (1994)
- Prime Suspect (1995)
- Absolutely Fabulous - Episodes: “The End” (1995) and “Huntin' Shootin' Fishin'” (2003)
- French and Saunders - Episode: “Baywatch” (1996)
- Goodnight, Mister Tom (1998)
- Midsomer Murders - Episode: "Death's Shadow" (1999)
- Resistance (2011)
