= TIMM (TV) =

- Country: Germany
- Broadcast area: National
- Headquarters: Berlin, Germany

Programming
- Picture format: 4:3/16:9

Ownership
- Owner: Deutsche Fernsehwerke GmbH (DFW)

History
- Launched: 1 November 2008
- Closed: April 2019

Links
- Website: TIMM

TIMM (stylized as TiMM.) was a German language free-to-air cable and satellite service from Germany targeting gay male audiences. It was first launched on November 1, 2008. It was also available over livestream.

TIMM is a general lifestyle and entertainment channel with various programming, including dramas, comedies, films, and lifestyle series. As of February 1, 2009 it airs 24/7. In January 2010, the Deutsche Fernsehwerke GmbH, owner of TIMM, applied for insolvency proceedings. TIMM stopped airing via Astra 1L as of 22 February 2010, and was available via cable only.
