= 22nd International Emmy Awards =

1994 awards ceremony

- Date: November 21, 1994
- Location: New York Hilton Midtown; New York City
- Hosted by: Peter Ustinov

The 22nd International Emmy Awards took place on November 21, 1994 in New York City and was hosted by Peter Ustinov. The award ceremony, presented by the International Academy of Television Arts and Sciences (IATAS), honors all programming produced and originally aired outside the United States.

== Ceremony ==
The BBC was the big winner at the 1994 International Emmy Awards ceremony, with five awards–more than any broadcaster has won in a single year. The comedy series Absolutely Fabulous, starring Joanna Lumley and Jennifer Saunders, shared the award for best popular art program with Red Dwarf, starring Craig Charles and Chris Barrie. Other winners of the night were David Jason's The Bullion Boys, Sir David Attenborough's Life in the Freezer documentary category, and a puppet version of Peter and the Wolf narrated by rock star Sting.

Academy International also gave Channel 4 a special award for 12 years of Film On Four, which was presented to Michael Grade, the channel's chief executive, and Jeremy Isaacs, television producer. The Founders Award, presented to comedian Bill Cosby, went to over 260 films, including Four Weddings and a Funeral, the box office hit considered to be Britain's most successful film.

== Winners ==
=== Best Children and Young People Program ===
- Insektors (France: Canal+)

=== Best Documentary ===
- Life in the Freezer (United Kingdom: BBC)

=== Best Drama ===
- The Bullion Boys (United Kingdom: BBC )

=== Best Performing Arts ===
- Peter and the Wolf (United Kingdom: BBC)

=== Best Popular Arts ===
- Red Dwarf (United Kingdom: BBC)
- Absolutely Fabulous (United Kingdom: BBC)
