= Absolutely Fabulous =

British TV sitcom (1992–2012)

- Title card (2011–2012)
- Genre: Sitcom
- Created by: Jennifer Saunders
- Based on: "Modern Mother and Daughter" from French and Saunders by Dawn French and Jennifer Saunders
- Written by: Jennifer Saunders
- Starring: Jennifer Saunders; Joanna Lumley; Julia Sawalha; June Whitfield; Jane Horrocks
- Theme music composer: Bob Dylan; Rick Danko
- Opening theme: "This Wheel's on Fire", performed by Julie Driscoll and Adrian Edmondson (Note: The theme song is performed by Julie Driscoll and Adrian Edmondson in series 1–4, as well as in the 20th anniversary specials. In the two-part special "The Last Shout", the theme song is performed by Marianne Faithfull and P. P. Arnold, while in the "Gay" special and in series 5, it is performed by Debbie Harry and Edmondson.)
- Country of origin: United Kingdom
- Original language: English
- No. of series: 5
- No. of episodes: 39 (list of episodes)

Production
- Camera setup: Video (1992–2012); Multiple camera; 16mm film (location scenes only, 1992–1995)
- Running time: 30–60 minutes
- Production companies: Saunders & French Productions; BBC Productions; Oxygen (2003); BBC America (2011–2012); Logo (2011–2012)

Original release
- Network: BBC2
- Release: 12 November – 17 December 1992
- Network: BBC One
- Release: 27 January 1994 – 7 November 1996
- Release: 31 August 2001 – 25 December 2004
- Release: 25 December 2011 – 23 July 2012

Absolutely Fabulous (often shortened to Ab Fab) is a British television sitcom created and written by Jennifer Saunders, which premiered in 1992. It is based on the 1990 French and Saunders sketch "Modern Mother and Daughter", created by Dawn French and Saunders.

Saunders stars as Edina Monsoon, a heavy-drinking, drug-abusing PR mogul who spends her time failing to lose weight and chasing bizarre fads in a desperate attempt to stay young and "hip". Edina's best friend is ex-model and magazine fashion director Patsy Stone (Joanna Lumley), whose drug abuse, alcohol consumption and desperate promiscuity far eclipse Edina's. Edina relies upon the support of her daughter Saffron (Julia Sawalha), a student and aspiring writer whose constant care of her immature mother has left her a bitter cynic. The series also stars June Whitfield as Edina's dotty, sarcastic and often thieving mother, and Jane Horrocks as Bubble, Edina's apparently near-useless personal assistant.

The first three series of Absolutely Fabulous were broadcast on the BBC from 1992 to 1995, followed by a series finale in the form of a two-part special entitled The Last Shout, in 1996. In 2000, the show was ranked number 17 on the 100 Greatest British Television Programmes by the British Film Institute. It was revived for two more series and two one-hour specials from 2001 to 2004. Three new episodes, collectively titled Absolutely Fabulous: 20th Anniversary, were released in 2011–2012. Two sketches for charity specials were also released, for Comic Relief in 2005 and Sport Relief in 2012. A film continuation, Absolutely Fabulous: The Movie, was theatrically released in 2016, with many of the show's supporting cast returning.

Saunders confirmed in 2016 that she is "not doing anything more with Ab Fab", as she wanted to focus on new projects. In October 2024, Saunders, Lumley, Sawalha and Horrocks appeared in the documentary Absolutely Fabulous: Inside Out, which was broadcast on Gold.

== Premise ==
Edina Monsoon (Saunders) is the middle-aged owner of a failing PR firm in London's Holland Park neighbourhood. Her best friend is Patsy Stone (Lumley), an ageing former fashion model who holds a sinecure position at a top British magazine. The two women use their considerable financial resources to indulge in cigarettes, alcohol (most notably Bollinger Champagne) and recreational drugs and to chase the latest fads in an attempt to maintain their youth and recapture their glory days as Mods in swinging London. The partnership is driven mainly by Patsy, who is both co-dependent and an enabler to Edina.

Their lifestyle inevitably leads to various personal crises, which are invariably resolved by Edina's daughter, Saffron Monsoon (Sawalha), whose constant involvement in their exploits has left her increasingly bitter and cynical. Edina's unnamed mother (Whitfield) visits the Monsoon home frequently to keep Saffron company, help with chores and, quite often, taking Edina's possessions to sell off at car boot sales. The relationship between Edina and mother is strained, as they disagree on virtually everything and are rarely alone together, a relationship with which they are both keen to antagonise each other. Meanwhile, Edina's affairs are handled, usually very badly, by Bubble (Horrocks), an incompetent, immature and neurotic personal assistant, whose antics frequently lead to further complications for Edina's business and personal life.

== Cast and characters ==
Character	Actor	Series 1	Series 2	Series 3	‘The Last Shout’ Specials (1996)	Series 4	‘Gay’ Special (2002)	Series 5	‘White Box’ Special (2004)	20th Anniversary Specials (2011–2012)	Film (2016)
Character	Actor	Main Cast									
Edina ‘Eddie’ Monsoon	Jennifer Saunders	^{Main}									
Patricia ‘Patsy’ Stone	Joanna Lumley	^{Main}									
Saffron ‘Saffy’ Monsoon	Julia Sawalha	^{Main}									
Mother	June Whitfield	^{Main}									
Bubble	Jane Horrocks	^{Main}				^{Main}					
		Recurring Cast									
Marshall Turtle	Christopher Ryan	^{Recurring}									
Catriona	Helen Lederer	^{Recurring}									
Fleur	Harriet Thorpe	^{Recurring}									
Justin	Christopher Malcolm	^{Recurring}								^{Recurring}	
Sarah	Naoko Mori	^{Recurring}						^{Recurring}		^{Recurring}	
Magda	Kathy Burke	^{Recurring}									^{Recurring}
Patsy's Mother	Eleanor Bron	^{Recurring}						^{Recurring}			
Bo Chrysalis	Mo Gaffney	^{Recurring}		^{Recurring}							
Oliver	Gary Beadle	^{Recurring}		^{Recurring}							
Lulu (singer)	Lulu		^{Recurring}							^{Recurring}	
Nurse/Beautician	Llewella Gideon		^{Recurring}					^{Recurring}		^{Recurring}	
Bettina	Miranda Richardson		^{Recurring}						^{Recurring}		
Max	Patrick Barlow		^{Recurring}						^{Recurring}		
Claudia Bing	Celia Imrie			^{Recurring}		^{Recurring}					^{Recurring}
Jackie Stone	Kate O'Mara			^{Recurring}				^{Recurring}			
Katy Grin	Jane Horrocks					^{Recurring}		^{Recurring}			
Twiggy	Twiggy					^{Recurring}					
Emma Bunton	Emma Bunton							^{Recurring}		^{Recurring}	
John Johnson	Felix Dexter							^{Recurring}			

=== Main ===
- Jennifer Saunders as Edina "Eddie" Monsoon
- Joanna Lumley as Patricia "Patsy" Stone
- Julia Sawalha as Saffron "Saffy" Monsoon, Edina's daughter
- Jane Horrocks as Bubble, Edina's brainless personal assistant (Horrocks also recurs as TV hostess Katy Grin in Series 4 and 5)
- June Whitfield as Edina's mother, never named but called "Mrs. M" by Patsy

=== Recurring and guest ===
- Christopher Ryan as Marshall Turtle, Edina's first husband, father of her mostly-unseen son Serge (Series 1–5, film)
- Mo Gaffney as Bo Chrysalis, Marshall's American girlfriend, later wife, a nurse and wellness enthusiast (Series 1, 3–5, film)
- Christopher Malcolm as Justin, Saffron's father and Edina's second husband, a Canadian antique dealer (Series 1–5)
- Naoko Mori as Sarah, Saffron's neurotic best friend (Series 1–5)
- Helen Lederer and Harriet Thorpe as Catriona and Fleur, Patsy's vain and superficial magazine co-editors (Series 1–5, film)
- Eleanor Bron as Patsy's free-spirited dilettante mother (Series 1–2, 5)
- Kathy Burke as Magda, the editor-in-chief of several magazines Patsy works for (Series 1–3, film)
- Gary Beadle as Oliver, Justin's partner (Series 1, 3)
- Miranda Richardson as Bettina, a former friend of Edina's (Series 2, 5)
- Patrick Barlow as Max, Bettina's husband (Series 2, 5)
- Llewella Gideon as a nurse/beautician, who openly detests Edina (Series 2, 5, film)
- Celia Imrie as Claudia Bing, Edina's chief rival in the PR industry (Series 3–4, film)
- Tilly Blackwood as Lady Candida De Denison-Bender (Series 4)
- Antony Cotton as Damon (Series 4)
- Felix Dexter as John Johnson, Saffron's husband, later ex-husband, and father of her daughter Jane/Lola (Series 5)

=== Special guests ===
Many celebrities, mainly British or American, appeared in the series, most of them as themselves. They include:

- Sylvia Anderson
- Christopher Biggins
- Crispin Bonham Carter
- Helena Bonham Carter
- Jo Brand
- Fern Britton
- Simon Brodkin
- Emma Bunton
- Danny Burstein
- Naomi Campbell
- Linford Christie
- Nicky Clarke
- Terence Conran
- Richard Curtis
- Carl Davis
- Daniela Denby-Ashe
- Marcella Detroit
- Sacha Distel
- James Dreyfus
- Minnie Driver
- Lindsay Duncan
- Adrian Edmondson
- Britt Ekland
- Idris Elba
- Marianne Faithfull
- Jesse Tyler Ferguson
- Dawn French
- Rebecca Front
- Mariella Frostrup
- Stephen Gately
- Jean-Paul Gaultier
- Whoopi Goldberg
- Dave Gorman
- Sofie Gråbøl
- Richard E Grant
- Germaine Greer
- Tanni Grey-Thompson
- Debbie Harry
- Miranda Hart
- Josh Hamilton
- David Haye
- Tom Hollander
- Kelly Holmes
- Colin Jackson
- Elton John
- Mark Kermode
- La Roux
- Christian Lacroix
- Nathan Lane
- Leigh Lawson
- Robert Lindsay
- Lulu
- Stella McCartney
- Natascha McElhone
- Suzy Menkes
- Laurie Metcalf
- Kate Moss
- Graham Norton
- Erin O'Connor
- Bruce Oldfield
- Kate O'Mara
- Anita Pallenberg
- Suzi Quatro
- Zandra Rhodes
- Mandy Rice-Davies
- Richard and Judy
- Kristin Scott Thomas
- Meera Syal
- Twiggy
- Rufus Wainwright
- Kirsty Wark
- Ruby Wax
- Dale Winton
- Katy Wix
- Clarissa Dickson Wright
- Dora Bryan

== Production ==
=== Development ===
Absolutely Fabulous evolved from a French and Saunders sketch called "Modern Mother and Daughter" (from series 3 episode 6), which starred Saunders as the mother, named Adrianna, and French as the daughter, named Saffron (as in the series). The sketch revolved around a middle-aged single mother who acted like a teenager and was reliant upon the emotional and financial support of her teenage daughter, who behaved like a middle-aged woman.

It has no connection, other than the character's name, to the earlier film, Eddie Monsoon: A Life?, a comedy play written by Saunders' husband Adrian Edmondson in 1984 for the TV series, The Comic Strip Presents.... The name "Edina Monsoon" is derived from Edmondson's name and "Eddy Monsoon" is a nickname of his.

The main cast, from left to right: Jane Horrocks, Julia Sawalha, Jennifer Saunders, June Whitfield and Joanna Lumley

Saunders revealed in 2012 that she was inspired by pop band Bananarama, with whom she and Dawn French had become friends after their Comic Relief collaboration in 1989.

"The nights with Bananarama were some of the best nights of my life, and I got a lot of gags from Bananarama because they were big vodka drinkers...when I started doing AbFab, I remembered all of the falls that I saw Bananarama do. I once saw one of them coming out of a cab bottom first and hitting the road, and I thought 'that's class'".

Although Ab Fab was produced by Saunders and French's company, Saunders & French Productions, Dawn French appeared on the show only once, in a cameo in the first-series episode "Magazine", before making a brief cameo in the 2016 film. French was originally intended to play Edina's daughter, Saffron, but a younger actress (Sawalha) was ultimately cast.

Jennifer Saunders recalled in 2016 that Joanna Lumley was not "what I had in mind for Patsy", having originally envisaged the character as a "low-life journalist". Lumley asked her agent to withdraw her from the project, following the "awkward" initial read through, having received a subdued response from Saunders. Lumley's agent persuaded her to commit to the pilot and the character was re-shaped around Lumley's performance and modelling past.

Absolutely Fabulous initially met with some resistance at the BBC. Producer Jon Plowman recalled that the Head of Comedy did not think women being drunk was funny. According to Plowman, an assistant to the Head of Entertainment enjoyed the pilot so much that she made copies of it and shared it with friends, this positive reaction helped persuade the BBC to commission the series.

The first three series were broadcast on the BBC from 1992 to 1995, followed by a series finale in the form of a two-part television film entitled The Last Shout in 1996. Saunders revived the show for a fourth series in 2001 after writing and submitting a pilot entitled Mirrorball, which recruited nearly all of the original cast in new roles. The pilot was intended to be turned into a series of episodes. However, Saunders felt the AbFab characters were too rich and interesting to put aside and were far better suited for her new story ideas. Instead of Mirrorball, a new series of Absolutely Fabulous was proposed to the BBC, which later commissioned the fourth series in 2001. From 2001 to 2004, two series were produced, along with two one-off hour-long specials; Gay (retitled and issued as Absolutely Fabulous in New York for the United States) in 2002 and White Box (another series finale), which aired in 2004. A Comic Relief sketch was broadcast in 2005.

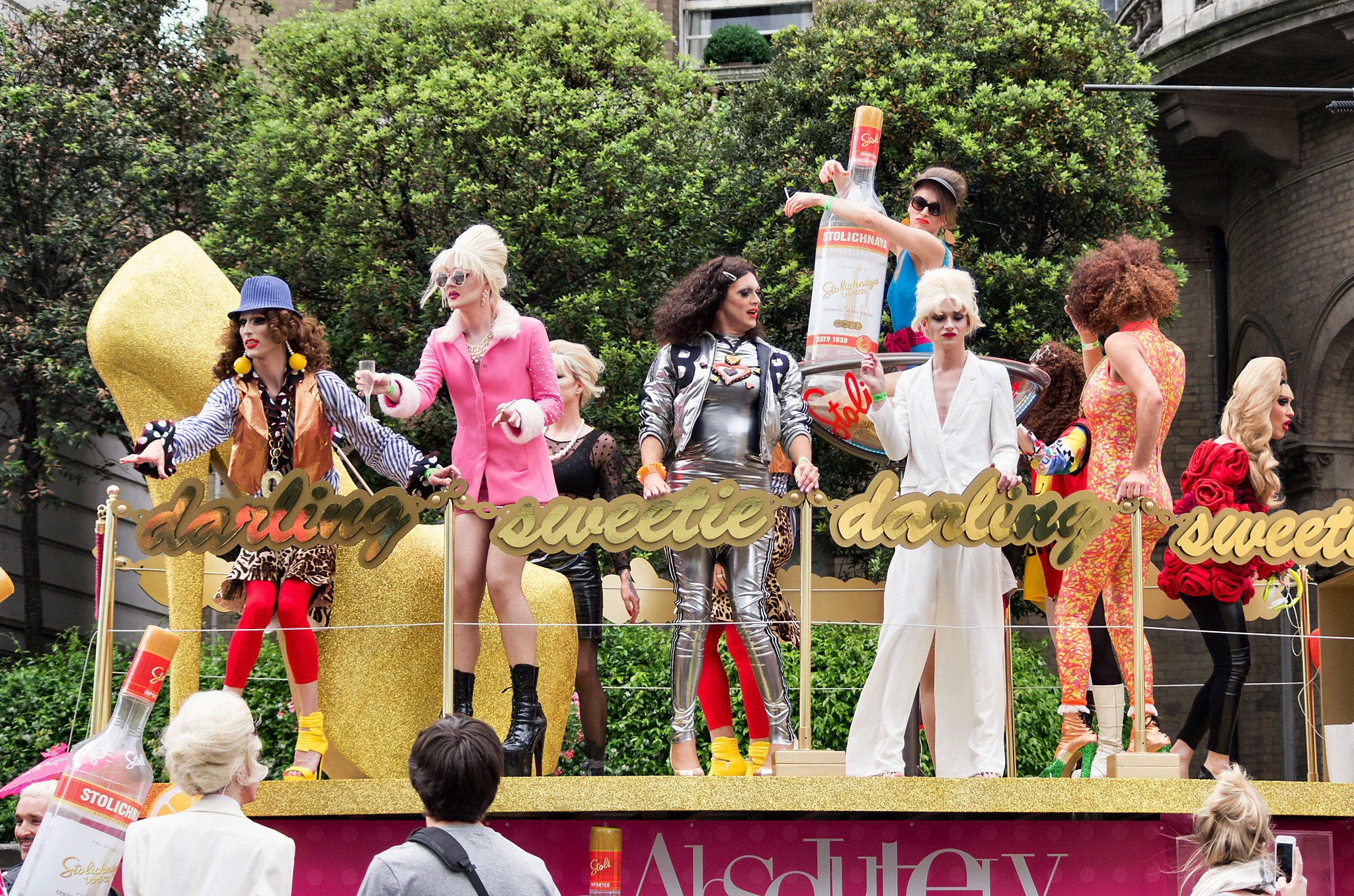
An Absolutely Fabulous float at Pride in London in June 2016

In November 2010, Lumley revealed to Playbill magazine that she had recently spoken to Saunders about possibly filming a new series. Lumley and Saunders reunited for the M&S Christmas advert in 2009, along with other stars such as Twiggy and Stephen Fry. In August 2011, Lumley confirmed the planned filming of three new episodes. In 2011, plans for a 20th-anniversary revival were welcomed in The Guardian, which applauded the show as "prophetic". The first new special of Absolutely Fabulous: 20th Anniversary was broadcast on 25 December with the second episode being shown on 1 January 2012. The third and final special, aired on 23 July 2012, coincided with the 2012 Summer Olympics in London, with Stella McCartney appearing in a cameo role. A sketch for Sport Relief was also broadcast in 2012. A film version of the series, Absolutely Fabulous: The Movie, was released to cinemas in the summer of 2016.

Three new specials were announced to celebrate the show's 20th anniversary, with the first special, "Identity", airing on 25 December 2011. Jon Plowman, executive producer and original producer of the series, said: "Viewers have been fantastically loyal in their devotion to our show, so we're really thrilled to say that it's coming back for three new shows to celebrate our 20th anniversary. All of the originals who are back together again are still truly absolutely fabulous and the new adventures of Edina, Patsy, Saffy, Bubble and Mother, plus a few surprising guests, will be a real treat for viewers." Saunders announced in November 2011 that she had begun work on a film version of the series.

In the United States, the episodes were jointly co-produced by Logo and BBC America in the US. and aired in January 2012 for broadcast by both BBC America and Logo Channel. Both channels co-produced the 20th Anniversary episodes, although Logo removed some scenes for its airings. BBC America broadcast it in full. Both channels aired the episode in a 40-minute block to allow for commercial interruptions.

On 3 January 2012, following the success of the 20th anniversary specials, it was rumoured that Saunders was set to write another Christmas special for 2012. The BBC was rumoured to be urging her to write a sixth series for 2013. Saunders denied the reports of additional episodes via her Twitter account.

Episodes of Absolutely Fabulous were shot in front of a live studio audience.

=== Theme song ===
The theme song for Absolutely Fabulous is "This Wheel's on Fire", written by Bob Dylan and Rick Danko and performed by Julie Driscoll and Saunders' Comic Strip fellow and later husband, Adrian Edmondson. The song was also sung by Marianne Faithfull and P. P. Arnold for the two-part special, "The Last Shout", in 1996. Hermine Demoriane sang the theme song with a French accent over the closing credits of the series 4 episode "Paris" in 2001. At the end of the series 1 episode "Birthday", Edina and Patsy sang the song together on a karaoke machine. It was later performed by Debbie Harry and Edmondson in the 2002 Christmas special "Gay" (where Harry also guest-starred), as well as in series 5. For series 4, a line sung by David Bowie, "Ziggy played guitar", from his song "Ziggy Stardust", played at the end of each episode.

Due to copyright issues, the theme song is missing from many US Region 1 DVDs, replaced by an instrumental version. Also excised from the US DVD release is the musical number from Chicago performed by Horrocks, Gaffney, and Ryan during a dream sequence in the series 5 episode "Birthin'".

In addition to the official theme song, in 1994, Pet Shop Boys recorded a song for Comic Relief using excerpts of dialogue from the series put to dance music. The single was attributed to "Absolutely Fabulous produced by Pet Shop Boys". It peaked at number six on the UK Singles Chart in July 1994. The music video featured clips from the show and specially recorded footage of the Pet Shop Boys with Patsy and Edina.

On 10 June 2016, Kylie Minogue released a cover version of "This Wheel's on Fire" for the soundtrack to Absolutely Fabulous: The Movie, before the film's release in July 2016.

=== Conclusion ===
On 29 November 2016, Jennifer Saunders confirmed that she was "done" with Absolutely Fabulous and that it would not return to television for another series or specials, nor would a sequel to the film be made. Saunders said she wished to focus on new projects and spend more time with her family. Even so, in 2018, Saunders, when asked about the prospect of reviving the programme yet again, did not entirely dismiss it, saying "I am thinking at the moment of writing a little something. It has to be age-appropriate otherwise we’d have to be in wheelchairs basically. I think Julia is old enough to be my mother now." Saunders said the prospect of writing new stories with those characters was "always on [her] mind, always".

In November 2020, Joanna Lumley was asked about the possibility of another revival and said that that would be up to Saunders. Lumley said it was unlikely, as Saunders did not want to work on new stories featuring the characters at that time. Lumley said that June Whitfield's death in December 2018 also meant it was less likely to happen, but said if Saunders wished to write new Ab Fab stories, she would be up for returning to play Patsy; she said "wait and see".

== International broadcast ==
=== Europe ===
In Portugal, Ab Fab has been shown on RTP2. In Serbia, the first series was aired in 1998, through a network of local television stations. In 2004, the series was aired on B92, while in the Czech Republic, all episodes have been shown. In North Macedonia, all episodes have been shown several times on Sitel. In the Netherlands and Flanders, the series is popular, and it is still regularly re-broadcast by the VPRO and Canvas, respectively. In Sweden, all episodes were first broadcast by SVT, but reruns have later appeared on other channels. In Germany, it was broadcast by the Franco-German TV network Arte and gay-oriented channel TIMM. In France, before it was rerun on terrestrial TV arte, it was successively premiered on pay TV channel Canal +, cable channel Jimmy, and is now broadcast on France 4. In Finland, the series was broadcast by YLE TV1. In Estonia, the series was broadcast by ETV. In Poland, two series were broadcast by Wizja Jeden, later by TVP3, TVN7 and BBC Entertainment.

=== Australia/Oceania ===
In Australia, all series were initially shown on the ABC and on cable on UK.TV, and moved to The Comedy Channel in 2007. Repeats of the first three series were also shown on the Seven network. ABC continues to show it sporadically, including Christmas specials and occasional repeats of series five episodes. ABC2 also shows repeats of the show. As of 6–7 August 2016, the series was shown on Nine Network's sister channel 9Gem to promote the upcoming film adaptation. All five series were broadcast in New Zealand on TVNZ. In India, all five series, including the specials, have been shown on BBC Entertainment.

=== North America ===
In the United States, Absolutely Fabulous premiered on 24 July 1994 on Comedy Central with a 12-episode marathon. Some public television stations have also broadcast it, but not as part of the PBS program offerings, in addition to BBC America, Oxygen Network, and as of 2011, Logo, a gay-oriented channel. In Canada, the programme has appeared on the BBC Canada, the CBC, The Comedy Network and VisionTV. In the United States in April 2021, the entire series is being included with Amazon's Prime streaming service; while listed slightly differently, e.g., "Season 5" adds the final three episodes from 2011 to the British series five from 2003 to 2004, all episodes are available with a Prime membership. It is also available on the Britbox streaming service.

=== Other ===
In Israel, some of the series was aired on Yes Plus and on BBC Entertainment. In Brazil, all episodes were aired on Eurochannel & Multishow in the late 90s & 2000s beginning, and in the 2010s at GNT.

== Episodes ==
Series
Series	Episodes	Originally released		
Series	Episodes	First released	Last released	Network
1	6	12 November 1992	17 December 1992	BBC2
2	6	27 January 1994	10 March 1994	BBC One
3	6	30 March 1995	11 May 1995	BBC One
Specials	2	6 November 1996	7 November 1996	BBC One
4	6	31 August 2001	5 October 2001	BBC One
Special		27 December 2002		BBC One
5	8	17 October 2003	24 December 2003	BBC One
Special		25 December 2004		BBC One
20th Anniversary	3	25 December 2011	23 July 2012	BBC One

== Reception ==
=== Critical reception ===
Tim Gray of Variety magazine said that "Absolutely Fabulous, British sitcom about a rich, self-absorbed, falling-down-drunk woman, is not as funny as it intends to be, but it is absolutely unique, absolutely rude and absolutely politically incorrect". He also said that "AbFab offers no sense of justice, which may give viewers the heebie-jeebies, since Americans like to believe that the wicked, even if they are amusing, will get punished. But the characters are originals, and AbFab has the courage of its convictions, encouraging audiences to find humor in such recent comedic taboos as substance abuse or mistreated offspring."

Michael Hogan of The Daily Telegraph gave the 20th Anniversary specials a negative review; following the "Olympics" episode, he commented, "The special Olympic edition of Absolutely Fabulous [...] would have won no medals for comedy." He added, "This was the last of three 20th anniversary specials, the first pair of which were shown over Christmas. Every single one of those 20 years showed on-screen during this torturous half-hour."

In a more favourable review, Meredith Blake of The A.V. Club stated, "While longtime AbFab fans will enjoy this latest incarnation of the series, which has been reprised multiple times since its official end in 1995, 'Identity' most definitely isn't for AbFab neophytes, who will most likely be confused by the broad performances, the outré costumes, and the disembodied canned laughter."

=== Ratings ===
Series	Timeslot	# Ep.	First aired		Last aired		Rank	Avg. viewers (millions)
Series	Timeslot	# Ep.	Date	Viewers (millions)	Date	Viewers (millions)	Rank	Avg. viewers (millions)
1	Thursday 9:00 pm	6	12 November 1992	TBA	17 December 1992	TBA	TBA	TBA
2	Thursday 9:30 pm	6	27 January 1994	TBA	10 March 1994	TBA	TBA	TBA
3	Thursday 9:30 pm	6	30 March 1995	TBA	11 May 1995	TBA	TBA	TBA
4	Friday 9:00 pm	6	31 August 2001	8.28	5 October 2001	6.64	13	7.46
5	Friday 9:00 pm (1–7) Wednesday 9:05 pm (8)	8	17 October 2003	7.69	24 December 2003	6.91	N/A	6.74

=== Accolades ===
Year	Association	Category	Nominee	Result	Ref.
1993	British Academy Television Awards (BAFTA)	Light Entertainment Performance	Jennifer Saunders (Series 1)	Nominated	
1993	British Academy Television Awards (BAFTA)	Light Entertainment Performance	Joanna Lumley (Series 1)	Won	
1993	British Academy Television Awards (BAFTA)	Best Comedy (Programme or Series)	Jon Plowman, Bob Spiers, Jennifer Saunders (Series 1)	Won	
1995	British Academy Television Awards (BAFTA)	Best Comedy Performance	Joanna Lumley (Series 2)	Won	
1995	British Academy Television Awards (BAFTA)	Best Comedy (Programme or Series)	Jon Plowman, Bob Spiers, Jennifer Saunders (Series 2)	Nominated	
1996	British Academy Television Awards (BAFTA)	Best Comedy Performance	Joanna Lumley (Series 3)	Nominated	
1996	British Academy Television Awards (BAFTA)	Best Comedy (Programme or Series)	Jon Plowman, Bob Spiers, Jennifer Saunders (Series 3)	Nominated	
1997	British Academy Television Awards (BAFTA)	Best Comedy Performance	Joanna Lumley (episode: The Last Shout)	Nominated	
1997	British Academy Television Awards (BAFTA)	Best Comedy (Programme or Series)	Jon Plowman, Bob Spiers, Jennifer Saunders, Janice Thomas (episode: The Last Shout)	Nominated	
2002	British Academy Television Awards (BAFTA)	Best Comedy Performance	Joanna Lumley (Series 4)	Nominated	
2012	British Academy Television Awards (BAFTA)	Best Female Performance in a Comedy Programme	Jennifer Saunders (20th Anniversary)	Won	
1993	British Academy Television Craft Awards	Best Costume Design	Sarah Burns, Philip Lester (Series 1)	Nominated	
2005	British Academy Television Craft Awards	Best Make-Up & Hair Design	Christine Cant (episode: White Box)	Nominated	
1993	British Comedy Awards	Best Comedy Actress	Jennifer Saunders (Series 1)	Nominated	
1993	British Comedy Awards	Best Comedy Actress	Joanna Lumley (Series 1)	Won	
1993	British Comedy Awards	Best New TV Comedy	Absolutely Fabulous (Series 1)	Won	
1994	British Comedy Awards	Best TV Comedy Actress	Jennifer Saunders (Series 2)	Nominated	
1994	British Comedy Awards	Best BBC Sitcom	Absolutely Fabulous (Series 2)	Nominated	
1995	British Comedy Awards	Best BBC Sitcom	Absolutely Fabulous (Series 3)	Nominated	
2002	British Comedy Awards	Best Comedy Actress	Joanna Lumley (Series 4)	Nominated	
1993	Writers' Guild of Great Britain	TV - Situation Comedy	Jennifer Saunders (Series 1)	Won	
1994	International Emmy Awards	Popular Arts	Absolutely Fabulous (episode: "Hospital") (Tied with Red Dwarf)	Won	
1995	CableACE Award	International Dramatic or Comedy Special or Series/Movie or Miniseries	Jon Plowman	Nominated	
1995	National Television Awards	Most Popular Comedy Programme	Absolutely Fabulous (Series 3)	Nominated	
2013	National Television Awards	Most Popular Situation Comedy	Absolutely Fabulous (20th Anniversary)	Nominated	
2004	Television and Radio Industries Club	Comedy Programme	Absolutely Fabulous (Series 5)	Won	
2018	Online Film & Television Association	TV Hall of Fame	Absolutely Fabulous	Won	

=== Cultural impact ===
In 2000, Absolutely Fabulous was ranked as the 17th greatest British television show of all time by the British Film Institute (BFI). In 1997, the pilot episode, "Fashion", was ranked #47 on TV Guide's "100 Greatest Episodes of All-Time" list. A scene from the show was included in the TV's 100 Greatest Moments programme broadcast by Channel 4 in 1999. In 2004 and 2007, the show was ranked #24 and #29 on TV Guide's "Top Cult Shows Ever" list. In 2019, the series ranked #9 in Radio Times' top 20 British sitcoms of all time. Absolutely Fabulous has a 96% rating on Rotten Tomatoes.

From its earliest series, Absolutely Fabulous won a devoted cult status with gay audiences, which persists. There have been numerous tributes over the years, such as an Absolutely Fabulous drag show at Sydney Gay and Lesbian Mardi Gras, and the song "Absolutely Fabulous" by synth-pop duo Pet Shop Boys. Later series of the show leaned into its cult status, including more gay-related storylines, such as Edina's search for her estranged gay son and Edina and Patsy marrying each other in a same-sex commitment ceremony.

== Adaptations and related media ==
A proposed American remake that would have starred Carrie Fisher and Barbara Carrera was put into motion by Roseanne Barr but never materialised. However, Barr did incorporate many elements of the show into the ninth season of her eponymous show Roseanne, in which her character wins the lottery: Saunders and Lumley reprised their characters Edina and Patsy, and Mo Gaffney also appeared in the episode, though not as her character Bo. Two later American sitcoms, Cybill and High Society, also adapted elements of Absolutely Fabulous for the American audience.

It was announced on 7 October 2008 that an American version of the series was in the works. The series was tentatively called Ab Fab and relocated to Los Angeles. Saturday Night Live writer Christine Zander worked on the new scripts and would have been executive producer along with Saunders and BBC Worldwide's Ian Moffitt. Sony Pictures Television, BBC Worldwide, and indie Tantamount were producing the new series for Fox, which greenlighted the pilot as a possible Fall 2009 entry with Kathryn Hahn as Eddy and Kristen Johnston as Patsy. In May 2009, Fox decided not to commission a full series.

The stage for the kitchen in Ab Fab was subsequently used as the stage for the shop in the British comedy Miranda. Miranda Hart, creator of the show, had previously appeared on Absolutely Fabulous.

=== Mirrorball ===
Mirrorball was a pilot set in the London theatre scene, starring the cast of Absolutely Fabulous as alternative characters. While writing and filming the show, Saunders was inspired to revive Absolutely Fabulous for a fourth series, which resulted in her abandoning Mirrorball. It was eventually aired as a television special and is included as a special feature on the fourth series DVD. Some original characters from Mirrorball feature in the fourth series.

=== Absolument fabuleux ===
A French film inspired by Absolutely Fabulous, titled Absolument fabuleux, was released in 2001. It was written and directed by Gabriel Aghion, and starred Josiane Balasko as Eddy and Nathalie Baye as Patsy. Saunders had a small cameo alongside Catherine Deneuve as a spectator at a fashion show. Amanda Lear was asked to play the part of Patsy but turned it down laughingly, saying she had "already lived it".

=== Absolutely Fabulous: The Movie ===
In 2011, before the release of the new episodes for 2011/2012, Deadline Hollywood reported that Saunders planned to begin writing a script for a film of Absolutely Fabulous in 2012. The film would begin with Edina and Patsy waking up on an oligarch's deserted yacht, drifting in the ocean. Saunders later said that the film would be set on the French Riviera. In March 2012, Saunders confirmed that she was working on the script. She said of the film's plotline:

Eddy and Patsy are looking for what they imagine glamorous life should be. They're constantly searching for that perfect place to sit or that perfect pair of sunglasses. It's Shangri-La and it just might be round the next corner. In the meantime, they decide to take Saffy's (Julia Sawalha) daughter off her – she calls her Jane, I call her Lola – but then they lose her.

Saunders also stated that now that she had announced plans for a feature, there was no going back. She would do it for no reason other than having her alter-ego and Patsy walk down the red carpet at the film's premiere. In April 2013, Saunders said on the Alan Carr Chatty Man show that she had doubts about the film as she felt the cast was "too old". She felt pressure to write it and did not want to commit herself to it at this early stage.

On 4 January 2014 whilst appearing on The Jonathan Ross Show, Saunders officially confirmed that the movie will definitely be happening, as she felt obliged to write a script for a film adaptation after threatening it for so long. Saunders was quoted as saying: "Joanna Lumley kept announcing it and saying, 'Yes she's going to do it,' and then Dawn French on our radio show at Christmas said, 'I bet £100,000 that you don't write it,' so now I have to write it, otherwise I have to pay her £100,000'". In April 2014, Saunders again confirmed on BBC Breakfast that she was in the process of writing the film, and gave a prospective release date of sometime during 2015.

Principal photography on the film began on 12 October 2015 in the south of France and it premiered in London on 29 June 2016.

== Home media ==
Absolutely Fabulous was initially released on VHS in the UK by BBC Video ending with the eight-VHS box set Series 1–4 in November 2002. In the United States, series 1 and 2 were released together on Laserdisc by CBS/FOX in a boxed set in 1995, followed by series 3, released by CBS/FOX the following year and "The Last Shout" released by Image Entertainment in 1997. All episodes were later released on DVD, including a five-DVD box set titled The Complete DVD Collection: Series 1–4 in 2002. BBC Video distributed all releases and 2 Entertain (post 2004) except for The Last Shout which was released by Vision Video and Universal Studios. The entire series is also available on demand on iTunes. When the first three series were re-released on DVD, they did not include corresponding cover photography to their series: Series 1 included an image from the Series 3 episode "Jealous", Series 2 had an image from the Series 3 episode "Doorhandle" and Series 3 is from the Series 2 episode "Poor". All other releases included imagery from the correct series, as do the original VHS releases.

In North America, all episodes have been released on DVD by BBC Video and Warner Home Video, including a complete collection named Absolutely Everything. The Last Shout and Gay (released in the UK individually) were released as a collection called Absolutely Special in 2003. Another feature-length special White Box was released exclusively to the American market. It was eventually released in the United Kingdom on 15 November 2010 with its inclusion in the Absolutely Everything box set.

Other releases include Absolutely Not, a bloopers and outtakes collection, and Absolutely Fabulous: A Life (released as "Ab Fab: Moments" in the United States exclusively to VHS), a mockumentary including 15 minutes of new material interspersed with clips from the series. Both were only released on VHS in the UK; the latter was also released as a special feature on the box set release Absolutely Everything in America.

Save for "The Last Shout" and the specials "Gay" (aka "Absolutely Fabulous in New York") and "White Box", the entire series is available to stream via Hulu. The series is also available on Netflix.

=== UK VHS ===
In the United Kingdom, VHS releases were distributed by BBC Video, except The Last Shout, which was released by Vision Video, with a final release in 2002.

Series/special	Episodes	Release date	Runtime	BBFC rating	Additional
Series 1 (Part 1)	3	4 October 1993	86 minutes	15	Contains the first three episodes of Series 1: Fashion, Fat, France
Series 1 (Part 2)	3	4 October 1993	86 minutes	15	Contains the remaining three episodes of Series 1: Iso Tank, Birthday, Magazine
Series 2 (Part 1)	3	19 October 1994	88 minutes	12	Contains the first three episodes of Series 2: Hospital, Death, Morocco
Series 2 (Part 2)	3	19 October 1994	87 minutes	15	Contains the remaining three episodes of Series 2 New Best Friend, Poor, Birth
The Complete Series 1	6	3 July 1995	173 minutes	15	Double VHS Collection containing all six episodes from Series 1
Series 3 (Part 1)	3	2 October 1995	86 minutes	15	Contains the first three episodes of Series 3 Doorhandle, Happy New Year, Sex
Series 3 (Part 2)	3	2 October 1995	84 minutes	15	Contains the remaining three episodes of Series 3 Jealous, Fear, The End
Series 1–3	18	30 October 1995	518 minutes	15	6 VHS Box Set containing all 18 episodes from Series 1—3
The Complete Series 2	6	6 May 1996	175 minutes	15	Double VHS Collection containing all six episodes from Series 2
The Last Shout	2	11 November 1996	100 minutes	12	Final Episodes Special Parts 1 & 2
Absolutely Fabulous: Absolutely Not	N/A	3 November 1997	58 minutes	15	The Designer Balls-Up Collection: contains bloopers and outtakes
Absolutely Fabulous: A Life	N/A	2 November 1998	78 minutes	12	Mockumentary with 15 minutes of new material with clips from the series; BBFC: 12
The Complete Series 4	6	19 November 2001	180 minutes	15	Single VHS tape containing all six episodes from Series 4
The Complete Series 3	6	25 November 2002	178 minutes	15	Single VHS tape containing all six episodes from Series 3
The Complete Series 2	6	25 November 2002	175 minutes	15	Single VHS tape containing all six episodes from Series 2 – different packaging
The Complete Series 1	6	25 November 2002	173 minutes	15	Single VHS tape containing all six episodes from Series 1 – different packaging
Series 1–4	24	25 November 2002	720 minutes	15	4 VHS Box Set containing all 24 episodes from Series 1–4

=== DVD releases ===
All five series of Absolutely Fabulous have been released on DVD in individual series sets in Region 1, 2 & 4 via BBC Video, 2Entertain and Roadshow Entertainment, respectively. The specials have also been made available, not all in individual sets; "The Last Shout" was handled through Via Vision on Region 2, Universal Studios Home Entertainment on Region 4, and it was included alongside "Gay" on Region 1 from BBC Video. "Gay” was only released individually on Region 2, while it was included with the fifth series Region 4 DVD. "White Box" was only made available individually on Region 1 & 4. The 20th Anniversary DVD was released individually on all regions.

A set comprising the first three series was released on Region 1 only. A series one to four set was made available on Region 2 & 4. In 2006, Region 4 was the first region to release all five series; however, due to licensing rights, "The Last Shout" was omitted from the set, but "Gay" and "White Box" remained. It was re-released in 2011, including "The Last Shout". The same set was released prior on Region 1 in 2008 and on Region 2 in 2010, which, for the first time, included "White Box" in the UK, which was never available individually. A complete series set was released on all regions with the addition of the 20th Anniversary Specials.

Individual series sets, specials & collection sets
Series/ specials	Release date			Features
Series/ specials	Region 1	Region 2	Region 4	Features
Series 1	13 March 2001	20 November 2000	3 October 2001	six episodes; BBFC rating: 15; ACB rating: M
Series 2	13 March 2001	1 October 2001	28 February 2002	six episodes; BBFC rating: 15; ACB rating: M
Series 3	13 March 2001	12 November 2001	1 July 2002	six episodes; BBFC rating: 15; ACB rating: M
Series 4	5 February 2002	8 April 2002	8 August 2002	six episodes; BBFC rating: 15; ACB rating: M
Series 5	16 March 2004	27 September 2004	7 April 2004	8 episodes (Region 1 & 2); 9 episodes (Region 4 – includes "Gay"); BBFC rating: 15; ACB rating: M
Specials
The Last Shout	—N/a	27 November 2000	20 June 2001	BBFC rating: 12; ACB rating: M
Gay	—N/a	29 September 2003	—N/a	BBFC rating: 15
Absolutely Special	30 September 2003	—N/a	—N/a	two specials; Includes "The Last Shout" & "Gay" (aka "Absolutely Fabulous in New York"); Other release(s): 13 September 2005
White Box	16 October 2007	—N/a	3 November 2005	ACB rating: M
Ab Fab at 20	11 September 2012	30 July 2012	16 August 2012	BBFC rating: 15; ACB rating: M
Collections
Series 1–3	13 March 2001	—N/a	—N/a	18 episodes; 4 discs; Special features: Outtakes; Photo Galleries; How to be Absolutely Fabulous; Ab Fab Moments; Modern Day Mother and Daughter; Let's Get Celebritied Up; Who's Who in Ab Fab; It's a Fabulous World
Series 1–4	—N/a	25 November 2002	8 October 2002	BBFC rating: 15; ACB rating: M
Series 1–5	—N/a	—N/a	20 April 2006	34 episodes; Series 1–5, specials: "Gay" & "White Box" (excluding "The Last Shout"); ACB rating: M
Series 1–5	27 May 2008	15 November 2010	7 April 2011	36 episodes; Series 1–5, specials: "The Last Shout", "Gay" & "White Box"; BBFC rating: 15; ACB rating: M
Complete	5 November 2013	17 March 2014	30 April 2014	All 39 episodes; Series 1–5, specials: "The Last Shout", "Gay", White Box" & "Ab Fab at 20"; BBFC rating: 15; ACB rating: M

== See also ==
- British sitcom
- List of British television programmes
- List of programs broadcast by Comedy Central
