= Patsy Stone =

Sitcom character

- Absolutely Fabulous character
- Joanna Lumley as Patsy Stone
- First appearance: "Fashion" (1992)
- Last appearance: Absolutely Fabulous: The Movie (2016)
- Created by: Jennifer Saunders
- Portrayed by: Joanna Lumley

In-universe information
- Full name: Eurydice Colette Clytemnestra Dido Bathsheba Rabelais Patricia Cocteau Stone
- Nickname: Pats
- Gender: Female
- Occupation: Former fashion model; Former pornographic actress; Magazine fashion director; Buyer for Jeremy's
- Family: Mother (deceased); Jackie (sister; deceased)
- Spouses: Edina Monsoon; Baroness Lubliana (pretending to be a man, "Pat", in Cannes)

Patsy Stone is one of the three main characters from the British television sitcom Absolutely Fabulous. The character is portrayed by actress Joanna Lumley.

== Background ==
Patsy was the last of a string of children born to an aging Bohemian mother in Paris. Patsy's mother gave birth "like a giant sprinkler, scattering bastard babies to the four corners of the globe".

In a flashback showing Patsy's birth, Patsy's mother (Eleanor Bron) tells an attendant to cut the umbilical cord and then exclaims that she names the child Eurydice Colette Clytemnestra Dido Bathsheba Rabelais Patricia Cocteau Stone.

The only one of Patsy's siblings that appears in the series is her sister Jackie (Kate O'Mara), a former high-class escort. Patsy worships Jackie although Jackie treats her horribly and twice tried to murder her via a heroin overdose.

Patsy and Edina Monsoon were childhood friends, and since her mother despised and neglected her—regarding her more as a rival than a daughter—she came to rely on the Monsoons for most of her shelter, comfort, and food (though she has only been seen eating twice since 1973).

Patsy mentioned that her mother would have had an abortion, but she mistook her pregnancy with Patsy for the onset of menopause. The first few years of Patsy's life were spent locked in a room. By Patsy's description, the rest of her childhood was dismal; she was without friends, parties, and presents. Although her mother eventually sent her to school, Patsy was much older than all the other students by the time she began attending. This explains a potential plot hole where Edina and Patsy are supposedly far apart in age, yet are shown to be in the same school year in flashback.

Although Patsy claims to have been an it girl and in-demand model in 1960s Swinging London, flashbacks reveal she was completely unsuccessful, only obtaining work through latching on to high-profile designers and models and manipulating them into feeling sorry for her. Flashbacks to the 1960s reveal Patsy wreaking havoc on the respective sets of Zandra Rhodes' and Annagret Tree's photo shoots.

Patsy may have appeared in the pornographic magazine Razzle, as she becomes concerned when an old copy of the magazine is discovered by Saffron in her half-brother Serge's bedroom. She dubs herself an "ex-Bond girl", but the films she starred in were actually Bond-inspired sexploitation films titled Bond Meets Black Emanuelle, Boldfinger and The Man with Thunder Balls. In "Schmoozin'", a group of partygoers are treated to a viewing of Patsy's 1970s softcore pornographic film Booberella.

Patsy claims to have slept with every member of the Rolling Stones, stating that "...you didn't have a favourite Stone, you had 'em all." She also claims to have slept with Keith Moon ("Well sort of. I woke up underneath him in a hotel room once."), and one of the Beatles, although she cannot remember which one.

On various occasions throughout the series, it is alluded to that Patsy was a trans man, having undergone surgery in Morocco in the 1960s. Edina states that Patsy only had constructed male genitalia for a few months "before it fell off". Elton John recognises her as someone he had slept with when she transitioned.

== In the series ==
=== Friendship with Edina ===
Patsy shares a codependent existence with Edina and often acts as her enabler, encouraging her to partake in addictive behaviours like smoking and drinking. The relationship usually results in hilarious, albeit dysfunctional, behaviour and over-the-top conflicts.

The two usually spend their days shopping at high-end department stores and boutiques (Harvey Nichols being their favourite), going to lunch at trendy restaurants, and avoiding their respective work places.

Patsy is more parasitic in her dependence than Edina is. She spends most of her spare time at Edina's house, drinks Edina's booze, and uses her chauffeur-driven car. At some points, Patsy lives with Edina, either in the attic, in Saffron's bedroom, or in the utility room. In "Death", Patsy attempts to convince Edina to bequeath Edina's multimillion-pound Holland Park house to her.

Patsy's reliance on her friendship with Edina causes Patsy to undermine any relationships that divert Edina's attention. This reliance is the root of Patsy's nearly constant antagonism toward Edina's daughter, Saffron. Patsy is also quite critical of Edina, often making passive jabs at her weight and poor fashion choices.

=== Appearance ===
Unlike Edina, whose dress sense is dictated by fashion rather than what suits her, Patsy is usually seen sporting a more 'classic' style, generally consisting of a designer power suit and her trademark blonde beehive with a fringe (dubbed her 'crutch' by Fleur in the episode "Donkey"). She has a particular fondness for couture Chanel jackets, which she wears to editorial meetings to intimidate her colleagues.

Patsy's birthdate is October 30th, but her precise age remains ambiguous; she typically claims to be between 39 and 43 years old. The first series, set in 1992, establishes her as a school classmate of Edina's, who turns 40 in that series, suggesting Patsy is, at most, 41. However, subsequent episodes indicate that Patsy's mother kept her out of school for extended periods, meaning she could have been Edina's classmate despite being older. She is so obsessed with projecting youth that she uses a false passport (obtained from "Johnny Fingers" on the Isle of Dogs) with a doctored picture from her modelling days. In "Cold Turkey", a nurse guesses that she is approximately 65 years old.

In the episode series 3 "Happy New Year", Patsy's older sister Jackie reveals that she is 72 years old, to which Patsy replies, "My God, then how old does that make me?", suggesting that Patsy has lied about her age so often that she can no longer remember her real age. Her vanity and obsession with youth leads her to use radical beauty treatments, including sulfuric acid peels, collagen lip injections, and the Botox-like filler Parralox, which freezes wrinkles but paralyses her face.

As the series progresses, Patsy betrays her age more and more, appearing to become more feeble beginning in the fourth series. In "Menopause", Patsy has to visit the hospital after fracturing her bones doing simple tasks, like snapping her fingers. The doctor diagnoses her with osteoporosis and declares that she has the lowest bone density on record. In "Olympics", she admits to using adult diapers for occasional incontinence. Her poor eyesight is evident, with Patsy often colliding with objects and having to scrutinize type and images very closely.

=== Personality ===
Patsy usually seems quite cold and unemotive, especially in her behaviour toward her chief rival Saffron, but she sometimes reveals a more vulnerable side (in flashbacks to her bleak life with her mother, in her overeager admiration for the awful Jackie, and in those rare moments when Edina temporarily withdraws her friendship) and even occasionally asks Saffron for advice. Patsy is an alcoholic, a chain smoker, and a frequent recreational drug user. She carries drugs with her at all times, storing joints in her trademark beehive. She has nearly overdosed on several occasions, and on one occasion in the series has to have her stomach pumped after a rave-style drug binge in Edina's sitting room. In "France", she is detained at customs after being found carrying what immigration officers believed to have been cocaine, only to be released when tests show she had been cheated into buying talcum powder.

In "Identity", she is revealed to have stiffed her former dealer, Barron, of £50,000 worth of drugs, justifying her habit by saying, "Have you seen the price of methadone? Cheaper to buy crack." Her drinks of choice are Bollinger champagne or Stolichnaya vodka ("Bolly and Stolly"), though she will drink whatever alcohol is around. She jokes that her blood-alcohol level is so high that "the last mosquito that bit me had to check into the Betty Ford Clinic." In "Birth", she causes a fire in Edina's kitchen when she passes out with a lit cigarette. Her addiction to cigarettes is so strong that she carries nicotine patches so that when she gets into a non-smoking cab, she can survive the journey.

At the beginning of the series, Patsy is very promiscuous and frank about her sexuality, seducing anyone she finds attractive. When the fourth series commences, Patsy's attractiveness to men has begun to wane, though she refuses to admit this and still throws herself at men. Her obsession with staying thin means that she rarely eats. She claims that she has not eaten anything since 1973. According to Edina, she has had a "stomach bypass". There are only two instances where she does eat. In the episode "New Year's Eve", she painfully chews and swallows a potato crisp and is visibly shaken from having actually eaten something. In the Christmas special "Cold Turkey", she renders the entire assembly speechless by demurely asking for a small slice of turkey during Christmas lunch; however, she chokes it up upon eating it.

=== Career ===
Throughout the first three series, Patsy is a fashion director at Ella magazine. She secured the job by sleeping with the publisher. Saffron derisively says that Patsy's job is to "invent random adjectives for pointless clothing." Patsy rarely does any work or goes to the office (in "Magazine", she cannot remember where her office is located in the building and needs to ask directions).

The benefits she most enjoys are the many free products she is given and the 50% discount she receives at Harvey Nichols. She refers to herself as an "international beauty and style guru", boasting that she is so influential that "one snap of my fingers and I can raise hemlines so high that the world is your gynaecologist."

In the series 3 episodes "Fear" and "The End", Patsy's magazine closes and she briefly moves to New York to take another fashion director job at HQ magazine. However, she is so lonely without Edina that she quickly returns to London. In part one of "The Last Shout", she is job-hunting, but ditches a job interview to go to the pub. In part two, her old boss Magda (Kathy Burke) gets her a job as fashion editor at another magazine, The A.

In the 2002 special "Gay", Patsy has taken a job as "executive creative director, chief buyer and lifestyle coordinator" for Jeremy's, an upscale boutique whose clientele consists of "rich bitches whose faces are pulled so tight they can't see what they're buying". She also briefly attempts to become a celebrity stylist, but this effort ends after a disastrous encounter with Minnie Driver. In "Birthin'", she is due to receive a "Global Style and Elegance" Award for promoting the importance of accessories, but fails to make the award show when Saffron goes into labour. In the 20th anniversary specials and the feature film, Patsy is once again working for a fashion magazine under the direction of her old boss Magda.

Patsy's colleagues at her original magazine are features editor Catriona (Helen Lederer) and beauty editor Fleur (Harriet Thorpe), who tag along on her various career moves.

== Significance ==
For her portrayal of Patsy Stone, Lumley was nominated four different times for the BAFTA Award for Best Comedy Performance, winning in 1995. She also won the BAFTA for Best Light Entertainment in 1993, and a British Comedy Award the same year for best actress.

The characters of Patsy and Edina Monsoon enjoy a significant following in the LGBT community and have long been favourite subjects for drag performances. In 2022, Welsh drag queen The Vivienne impersonated Lumley, in character as Patsy, in the Snatch Game challenge on RuPaul's Drag Race All Stars season 7. Jennifer Saunders has described both Patsy and Edina as unconventional feminists, because "[i]t's never been about them finding a relationship, or defining themselves by having to have a man. They live life entirely on their own terms as women, and to be honest, men don't really affect them much. I mean, occasionally they want sex, but who doesn't? They're not defined by normality. They create their own normality."
