= Edina Monsoon =

Character in the British television sitcom Absolutely Fabulous

- Absolutely Fabulous character
- Jennifer Saunders as Edina Monsoon
- First appearance: "Fashion" (1992)
- Last appearance: Absolutely Fabulous: The Movie (2016)
- Created by: Jennifer Saunders
- Portrayed by: Jennifer Saunders

In-universe information
- Full name: Edwina Margaret Rose Monsoon
- Nicknames: Eddie; "The Shredder"
- Gender: Female
- Title(s): Director of Monsoon PR, Director of Radical TV (formerly)
- Occupation: Public Relations Executive
- Family: "Mother" (name unknown); Unnamed father (deceased)
- Spouses: Justin (divorced); Marshall Turtle (divorced); Patsy Stone
- Children: Serge Turtle (son with Marshall); Saffron Monsoon (daughter with Justin)
- Relatives: Jane "Lola" Monsoon-Johnson (granddaughter, via Saffron)
- Nationality: British

Edina "Eddie" Margaret Rose Monsoon is one of the three main characters in the British television sitcom Absolutely Fabulous, created and portrayed by comedian Jennifer Saunders.

The founder and head of her own PR company, Edina consistently undermines her own professional success through chronic, self destructive behaviour—including drug addiction, alcoholism, and compulsive eating—all driven by her desire to recapture her youth as a mod in Swinging London.

Constantly attempting to appear young and "hip", Edina has adopted an extravagant personality and constantly pursues the latest fashion trends and crazes. Barely managing to keep her company afloat, Edina's life is kept in order by her long-suffering daughter, Saffron, who has been caring for her mother ever since she was a child.

== Character history ==
Edina was born with the forenames Edwina Margaret Rose on 6 August 1951 in London to parents whose names are never revealed on screen. Her mother is generally only referred to as "Mrs. M," but in the Season 3 episode The End, she is called "Mrs. Monsoon" by a TV shopping channel host in reference to their earlier conversation. It is revealed later in the episode that Mrs. M was using Edina's credit cards for her purchases, thus it is possible she was also using her name. However, the series never clearly establishes if Monsoon is Edina's married or maiden name, although in "Poor", a court judge addresses her as "Mrs. Monsoon".

Although Edina's mother was a loving parent, she was also eccentric and overprotective in addition to being passive aggressive regarding Eddie's weight and social status, a dynamic that left Edina with deep seated insecurities; Eddie's relationship with her father was strained. At some point, she began asking others to address her as "Edina", a request her mother refuses.

Edina was an awkward and maladjusted child and was nicknamed "The Shredder" due to her addiction to eating "huge amounts of tissues" and "whole toilet rolls". Sometime as a teenager she met and befriended Patsy Stone, an older, more popular and more conventionally attractive girl who soon became her best friend.

As a part of Swinging London's mod and countercultures, Edina finally found the popularity and sense of belonging that had always eluded her, and has spent the ensuing years attempting to relive this era in her life, often to her own detriment. Due to her excesses, she has suffered a series of lifelong addictions, including alcoholism, drug use, smoking, and compulsive eating, the latter of which compels her to unsuccessfully pursue numerous fad diets.

At some point in the late 1960s or early 70s, Edina met and married a man named Marshall Turtle, with whom she had a son named Serge. The marriage was brief and ended in divorce, though the two remained acquainted and in contact. Eddie's eccentricities proved overwhelming to Serge, who fled England as an adult and has never returned, claiming to have joined a research group to provide himself with a consistent excuse not to return home; in reality, he moved to New York City, where he embraced his homosexuality and became a bookseller. Edina would not reunite with him for over a decade.

In the mid-1970s Eddie met and married her second husband, Justin, with whom she gave birth to a daughter Saffron, via caesarean section. Though she contemplated giving the child up for adoption, Edina ultimately decided to keep her. Sometime around Saffron's birth Justin came out as homosexual and he and Eddie divorced, marking the beginning of a contentious relationship between the two as Justin wished to remain in his daughter's life.

Sometime in the 1980s Eddie opened a PR firm, Monsoon PR, representing the 1960s icons who were her idols in her youth including Twiggy and Lulu. Though Eddie consistently struggles to keep the business afloat, it still has allowed her to become wealthy and purchase a three-bedroom Holland Park house, which she claims cost £1.5m; unbeknownst to Edina, however, Justin arranged for Saffron to legally own the home in their divorce proceedings. Despite her financial and professional success, Edina was a largely absentee mother to Saffron, who found herself responsible for her own welfare from a young age. In Saffron's adolescence the two entered into a codependent relationship, with Saffron supporting her mother through drug binges and personal crises, while Edina consistently exposed her daughter to all manner of debauchery in the belief that she was providing her daughter with the exciting, "cultured" life she wishes for herself. The pair's relationship was further complicated by the constant presence of Patsy, who envied the life Eddie provided for her daughter and thus subjected Saffron to constant verbal and physical abuse, including using her hair for an ashtray and once tying Saffron to a traffic light as a child. Edina consistently justified Patsy's behavior to Saffron, much to the consternation of her daughter. Over the course of the show, Eddie and Saffron come close on numerous occasions to reconciling with one another, including a pair of instances in which Eddie rescues Saffron from potentially disastrous relationships and a trip to Paris in which each comes to see the other in a new light; these instances are always short-lived, usually due to some abusive or neglectful action on Edina's part. The pair finally have what appears to be a final falling out after Eddie strikes Saffron's toddler daughter, Jane, in a fit of pique, leading to Saffron kicking her mother out of the house. At some point in the intervening years, the pair reunited, and Saffron permitted Edina to move back in.

Over the course of the series, Eddie's PR firm goes through periodic crises that threaten her financial stability, particularly after her ex-husbands learn that she's been collecting alimony and child support payments from both of them for over a decade and cut her off. Though she often comes to the brink of bankruptcy, she always manages to stay afloat due to a mixture of both accident and her own occasional cunning, usually through managing to land one major client to prop up her empire, at different points representing Prozac and Emma Bunton. In the new millennium, Eddy has expanded her company to encompass not just a PR firm but a cable news network intended to compete with Sky; though the network ultimately fails due to neglect on Eddy's part, she still ends up profiting by selling the satellites. Moving into the 2010s, Eddy downsizes her company and begins working out of her home; by the time of the Absolutely Fabulous movie, Eddie has become more successful than ever before, having modified her home into a gaudy McMansion. Despite her high level of personal success, the fifty-something Eddie still finds herself unfulfilled; seeking to increase her profile ever further, she attempts recruiting Kate Moss to her roster, only to inadvertently knock Moss into the Thames during their encounter. Believing she's killed her, Eddie, Patsy, and a now teenaged Jane go on the run to Paris, where they scheme to wed Patsy to an aging billionaire in order to secure their futures. During the trip, a despondent Edina finally reaches the epiphany that none of her trend-chasing has fulfilled her and that she's still just as unsatisfied with life as she was in her forties. Following a police chase, Edina and Patsy crash a car into a pool, where- confronted by Saffron- Edina apologizes for being a bad mother and tells her daughter she's ready to die in repentance for the life she's led. Saffron's forgiveness and the news that Kate Moss survived falling into the Thames convinces Edina to swim to shore, and mother and daughter are reconciled.

=== Personality ===
A self-loathing yet self-obsessed neurotic, Edina's self-image is based on 1960s counterculture and the world of fashion and celebrity. She is fixated on self-indulgence and her ideas of self-actualization. Edina subscribes to every trend that arises, including New Age spirituality—she calls herself a Buddhist—and feng shui.

She aspires to move in the highest circles of creativity, fashion, and celebrity. She considers herself a follower of the latest trends, but, having no real sense of style of her own, Edina is actually a fashion victim, parading the latest fashion trends without understanding them or understanding what looks good on her.

She is a die-hard fan of Christian Lacroix and is quick to point out "It's Lacroix, sweetie, Lacroix". Edina is mildly overweight but not nearly so much as she believes herself to be and frequently attempts to conceal her bloated body with heavy, swaddling clothing which only adds to her absurd appearance. Others often draw attention to Edina's weight, aware of her obsession with it which only adds to her neurosis.

Edina is histrionic and a hypochondriac, demanding constant attention, medical treatment, and exaggerating even the slightest ailments. In the first episode of the second series "Hospital", she is referred to hospital for what appears to be nothing more than an ingrowing toenail, yet insisted on calling an ambulance rather than drive herself to hospital. She is obsessed with trying expensive beauty treatments and New Age alternative therapies, including recovered-memory therapy, sensory deprivation tanks, cranial acupuncture, past life regression therapy and aura consultations.

Edina is desperate to give off the aura of success, wealth and fabulousness. Her outrageous but always expensive wardrobe is one of her ways of doing this, as is the constant renovating of her home, especially the kitchen. She is extremely status conscious, loudly clarifying that her house is in Holland Park whenever someone identifies the neighbourhood as the less-upmarket Shepherd's Bush.

Edina claims to be a Buddhist, practising, in her words, "almost religiously". She also identifies as a vegetarian although she is seen eating meat on a few occasions. For dramatic purposes she had been described as being two stone (28 pounds) overweight. She frequently moans about being too fat; however, she hasn't the willpower to stay on any diet for long. She often says that one method she has used is to go shopping for clothes two sizes too small for her.

== Family ==
Edina has two ex-husbands, Justin (Christopher Malcolm) and Marshall (Christopher Ryan), both of whom give her hefty alimony payments. After they discover that they have both been paying for her mortgage, the payments are cut-off in the episode "Poor", which forces Edina to briefly economize.

Saffron's father Justin, Edina's second husband, is homosexual and for a time has a boyfriend named Oliver, who runs an antique shop with him. Marshall Turtle, Edina's first husband, is the father of her estranged son Serge. Marshall is a Hollywood producer with a history of substance abuse, who claims to have only married Edina because he was drunk at the time.

Edina's son Serge is alluded to throughout the series, but only appears once in the special "Gay". Serge left home at a young age, having been traumatized by his childhood with Edina. His whereabouts are kept a secret by Saffron and Marshall, who lie whenever she asks where he is. In "Gay", Edina steals Saffron's address book and discovers that Serge is living in New York City. She is elated to discover that he is gay and manages to track him down. However, after spending one wild night going clubbing with his mother, who treats him more as a gay accessory than a person, Serge disconnects from her for good.

She has a contentious relationship with her mother, (June Whitfield), who lives close by and constantly pays visits. Edina loudly berates her mother, often kicks her out of the house, and occasionally threatens to euthanize her. She blames her mother for her weight issues, because 'Mrs. M' didn't breastfeed her as a baby and brought her up on a diet of "chips and lard and potatoes and white bread and suet pudding covered in treacle." Edina's father is never seen on screen, but his passing away in "Death" (Series 2) elicits no visible regret or sadness from Edina. Mrs. Monsoon says that her husband was "scared stiff" of his daughter. In the movie adaptation, it is implied ambiguously that Edina has a sister called Violet (played by Wanda Ventham), who Saffron refers to as her Aunt.

Edina spends much of her life caught in an emotional tug of war between Patsy, her lifelong friend and corrupter, and Saffron, her sensible, goody-two-shoes daughter. Despite their frequent verbal sparring, Edina and Saffron often show genuine concern and affection for one another. Edina sometimes comforts Saffron without needing to, constantly reminding her daughter that she does love her.

In the episode, "The Last Shout", Edina prevented Saffron's marriage to an oppressive man, Paulo, who was treating her appallingly. Edina often shows a deep need to make her daughter proud of her. Saffron meanwhile believes that her mother's neuroses are the result of her lazy, hedonistic and flagrantly irresponsible lifestyle as well as the pernicious influence of Patsy. Given Edina's emotional immaturity, Saffron often takes on the role of a strict mother figure towards her, to the point where Edina is somewhat afraid of Saffron's temper and attempts to hide things from her.

=== Relationship with Patsy ===
Edina's friendship with Patsy forms a central theme of the series. The two have been friends since they were teenagers and are extremely co-dependent, to the exclusion of other friendships and relationships. They are also one another's enablers, encouraging each to behave badly and partake in addictive behaviours like smoking, drinking, and casual drug use (although Patsy is far worse in these areas than Edina).

The two occasionally try to separate from one another (i.e. when Patsy takes a job in New York in "Fear" and "The End"), but these instances are short-lived. Patsy's jealous attachment to Edina also leads her to sabotage Edina's romantic relationships (i.e. "Magazine" (series 1) and "Schmoozin'" (series 5)).

Patsy is the only person in Edina's life whom Edina is consistently kind to. However, Patsy can be extremely parasitic in her dependence on Edina, who without complaint allows Patsy to live in her home at various times throughout the series (either in Saffron's room, the utility closet, or the attic), to use her chauffeur-driven car, drink her alcohol, smoke her cigarettes and use her credit cards.

Patsy and Edina often exhibit the characteristics of a married couple, with Edina complaining that Patsy always gets "to be the man." This is referenced in the special "Gay", when Eddie and Patsy partake in a gay marriage ceremony in New York City.

== Career ==
Edina is the owner of a London PR company that fluctuates in success throughout the series. In several episodes, including "Fashion" and "The Last Shout", Edina demonstrates the creativity, organisational ability and shrewd business sense that have made her successful.

In the first episode, "Fashion", she prides herself as "going down in history as the woman that put Princess Anne in a Vivienne Westwood basque." She has a totally incompetent PA named Bubble (Jane Horrocks), whom Edina employs because she makes her look more competent. Edina visits her office infrequently, and only for a few hours at a time, preferring to spend her days shopping at Harvey Nichols and lunching with her best friend Patsy.

More often than not, Edina's business ventures fail rather than triumph. She is easily distracted, averse to work, and shows little knowledge of her clients' careers or accomplishments. Her staple client is the singer Lulu, who remains with her off and on throughout the series despite personally disliking her. Other celebrities she gains and loses as clients throughout the series include Emma Bunton, Queen Noor of Jordan, Twiggy and Kylie Minogue.

In series 3, Edina attempts to buy the "PR PR's Person of the Year" award for herself by sponsoring the ceremony and handpicking the judges, so she's outraged when they choose her arch-rival Claudia Bing (Celia Imrie) over her.

In the third episode, "France", Edina attempted to start her own interior design company, with her first client being her lifelong friend, Bettina, but for unexplained reasons the company failed without Bettina's apartment ever being decorated due to Edina not signing an urgent document in time.

In series one she creates her own boutique shop which sells ethnic ornaments sourced from war-torn countries and far-flung tribal communities. However, Edina hoards most of the merchandise for decorating her own home so the shop never becomes a success.

Edina experiences a nadir of success in series 3, after she lands Prozac as a client by coining the phrase "Cheer up, it may never happen." In "Fear" (Series 3 Ep. 5), she partners with "PRM", a massive American PR firm, landing "all the majors from the States" including Elizabeth Taylor and Planet Hollywood.

In series 4 Edina partners with Katie Grin (Jane Horrocks), a has-been TV starlet, to create a TV production company. Although she brands it a "multinational media, cable and satellite network with Murdoch airspace and strategic WAP tie-ins", she never manages to produce a single show. The company is instead sold to Edina's arch-rival Claudia Bing.

At the end of the series, with both her PR and TV companies foundering, Edina manages to sell her half of the company to Claudia Bing, who cedes Kylie Minogue, Lulu and several cancer charities back to Edina as part of the deal. This small clientele allows Eddie to salvage her PR company. In series 5 she is working out of her sitting room, which she has made into an office.

In the feature film, Eddie's finances and business are once again on the verge of failure. Desperate to reverse her fortunes, at the end of the film she manages to land Kate Moss and Nobu as clients and she is once again a success.

=== Finances ===
Because of her poor impulse control and the need she feels to display her wealth and success, Edina makes reckless financial decisions and is constantly overspending. Edina herself declares that she is not "cash-rich" and that her money is tied up in her accessories and shoe collection.

At the beginning of the series she leads an extravagant lifestyle in part because she has conned both of her ex-husbands into paying her mortgage (until it is discovered in "Birthday"). This leads to a financial reckoning in "Poor" (Series 2 Ep. 5), after both her ex-husbands cut off her alimony payments and her accountant admonishes her for overspending.

Nonetheless, she continues her lavish lifestyle, which includes frequent redecorations of her house, luxury holidays, a chauffeur-driven Jaguar car, groceries supplied by Harrods, and constant shopping for designer labels. In "Huntin', Shootin' & Fishin'" (Series 5) Edina bids £30,000 at a Tatler charity auction for a virtually worthless country house weekend retreat, just to impress the British nobility around her.

In Absolutely Fabulous: The Movie, Edina finds herself on the verge of insolvency after Marshall stops paying her mortgage and her business nears collapse. This contradicts the established TV narrative where Marshall stopped supporting Edina financially in the episode "Poor". In desperation she and Patsy embark on a scheme to woo one of Patsy's rich ex-lovers in the South of France. By the end of the film Patsy manages to marry a rich, senile heiress (Marcia Warren) and Edina's career revives, making her rich once again.
