= Jim Callis =

American sportswriter (born 1967)

- Born: October 15, 1967 (age 58); Falls Church, Virginia, U.S.
- Occupation: Writer at MLB.com

Jim Callis (born October 15, 1967) is a baseball writer who currently covers the MLB draft and prospects for MLB Pipeline and MLB.com. He was formerly the executive editor of the Durham, North Carolina–based magazine Baseball America and its website.

== Early life and education ==
Callis was born in Falls Church, Virginia, on October 15, 1967. He grew up in Northern Virginia, mainly in Oakton. He attended the University of Georgia, where he covered the Bulldogs baseball team for The Red and Black, the university's school paper. He graduated in 1988 with a degree in journalism.

== Career ==
Callis began working for Baseball America directly out of college in 1988. In 1997, he moved to Chicago to work for STATS, Inc. In 2000, Callis returned to Baseball America, as its executive editor. His contributions included weekly updates to its website and major contributions to its annual publications, The Baseball America Almanac and The Baseball America Prospect Handbook.

Callis moderated a weekly Baseball America themed online chat on ESPN.com. His chats on ESPN were always concluded by his signature lightning round, where he answered a high number of questions in a rapid fire style. Callis would frequently follow up his answers given during the lightning round in his weekly "Ask BA Column" on Baseball America's website.

Callis was a contributor to ESPN's television coverage of the 2008 MLB draft.

Callis began writing for MLB.com in 2013. He hosts the MLB Pipeline podcast with fellow MLB.com prospect writer Jonathan Mayo.
