= Empedocles (The X-Files) =

- The X-Files episode
- Jeb Dukes hallucinates that fire is beneath his skin. The elaborate effect was created using green screen technology.
- Episode no.: Season 8 Episode 17
- Directed by: Barry K. Thomas
- Written by: Greg Walker
- Production code: 8ABX17
- Original air date: April 22, 2001
- Running time: 44 minutes

Guest appearances
- Annabeth Gish as Monica Reyes; Dayna Beilenson as Roberta Toews; Veronica Brown as Payphone Woman; Ron Canada as Franklin Potter; Denise Crosby as Dr. Mary Speake; Devlin Elliott as Pizza Delivery Man; Amanda and Caitlin Fein as Mia Dukes; Jake Fritz as Luke John Doggett; Wendy Gazelle as Katha Dukes; Jennifer Hammon as Nurse; Cheryl Francis Harrington as Nurse; Louise Melilli as Distraught Woman; Jay Underwood as Jeb Larold Dukes; Bruce Wright as Gary Garber

Episode chronology
← Previous "Three Words"	Next → "Vienen"
- The X-Files season 8

"Empedocles" is the seventeenth episode of the eighth season of the American science fiction television series The X-Files. It premiered on the Fox network on April 22, 2001. The episode was written by Greg Walker and directed by Barry K. Thomas. "Empedocles" is a "Monster-of-the-Week" story, unconnected to the series' wider mythology. The episode received a Nielsen rating of 7.3 and was seen by 12.46 million viewers. Overall, the episode received mixed reviews from critics.

The show centers on FBI special agents Fox Mulder (David Duchovny), Dana Scully (Gillian Anderson) and John Doggett (Robert Patrick), who work on cases linked to the paranormal, called X-Files. In this episode, Monica Reyes (Annabeth Gish) enlists Mulder's help investigating a killer's connection to the unsolved murder of Doggett's son, but Mulder soon finds himself clashing with Doggett.

"Empedocles" was named after the famed Greek pre-Socratic philosopher of the same name. The episode marked the return of Special Agent Monica Reyes, who was first introduced in the earlier season eight episode "This is Not Happening". Reyes would later become Doggett's partner in the show's ninth season. The episode included an elaborate special effects sequence wherein actor Jay Underwood rips off his face to reveal fire underneath his skin, which was created via green screen technology.

== Plot ==
In New Orleans, mild-mannered white-collar worker Jeb Larold Dukes (Jay Underwood) is fired from his job. After leaving the office, he witnesses a car chase ending in a fiery crash. A burning figure that only Jeb can see emerges from the wreck and merges with him. Now possessed, Jeb returns to his office and massacres his boss and a co-worker.

FBI Agent Monica Reyes (Annabeth Gish) is subsequently assigned to investigate, and at the crime scene, she sees one victim suddenly carbonize into a charred corpse, then revert to normal. She calls Fox Mulder (David Duchovny), who is at the hospital with a pregnant Dana Scully (Gillian Anderson), but says she cannot discuss the case with John Doggett (Robert Patrick) because it concerns him. Meanwhile, Jeb tries to kill himself, then claws at his face to reveal burning embers beneath his skin.

Reyes tells Mulder that, years prior, she had helped investigate the murder of Doggett's son Luke. When Luke's body had been found, Reyes and Doggett saw the body transform into ashes momentarily. Reyes says that Doggett has spent the last few years convincing himself he did not see it. Now that she has seen it happen again, however, Reyes has come to believe that the vision is some sort of psychic message or clue.

Doggett later confronts Mulder about investigating his son's murder, but Reyes reveals that Bob Harvey, a suspect in the case, died in the New Orleans car crash just before the burning figure entered Jeb. She then learns from Jeb's sister, Katha, that Jeb did not know Harvey. Elsewhere, while fleeing, Jeb kills another motorist. When Doggett arrives at the scene of the murder, he has a flashback to his vision of Luke. Reyes takes the opportunity to explain her theory: Luke's murder was part of a "thread of evil", whereby evil passes from one person to another. Jeb, meanwhile, seeks help from Katha, insisting that something inside him committed the murders. However, when Katha calls the agents, he takes his niece hostage. Before Jeb can shoot Doggett, Reyes incapacitates him with a shot to the throat.

Doggett finally acknowledges what he saw when Luke was found. Mulder suggests that evil is like a disease that infects people and that tragedy can leave some people vulnerable to it. After Jeb dies, the evil apparently passes to Katha, whose eyes glow like his. She attacks Reyes and takes her gun, but Doggett stops her before she can kill Reyes. Later, Doggett looks in on Katha as she lies sedated in a hospital bed.

== Production ==
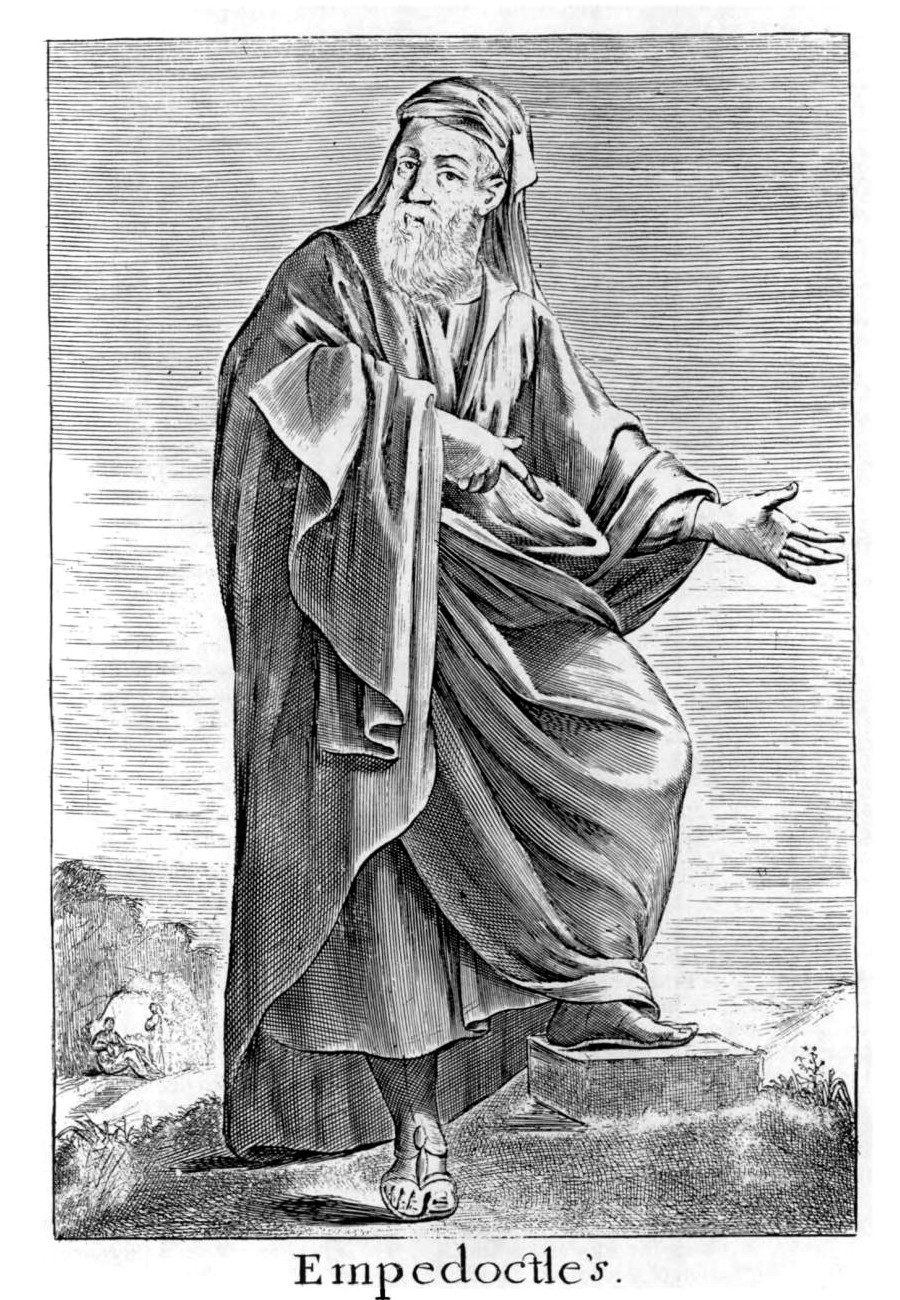
The episode was named after the famed philosopher Empedocles.

=== Writing ===
The episode was written by Greg Walker and directed by Barry K. Thomas, marking his directoral debut. The episode takes its title from the famed Greek pre-Socratic philosopher of the same name. Empedocles believed that out of the four classic elements—earth, wind, fire, and water—fire was the most powerful. As such, Empedocles is often associated with fire.

The episode marked the return of Special Agent Monica Reyes, who was first introduced in the earlier season eight episode "This is Not Happening". Although Reyes would later become Doggett's partner, the series attempted to differentiate the Doggett/Reyes relationship from the Mulder/Scully relationship. Robert Patrick later noted, "We're not going to try to duplicate [the Mulder and Scully relationship], we're not going to try to regenerate the magic chemistry." However, he later did say "that Gillian and I had our own chemistry that was unique unto itself, and likewise with the addition of Annabeth. It was different."

=== Special effects ===
In order to create the "Lava Face" effect, actor Jay Underwood's face was painted green. A mask with pre-cut slits was then placed over the skin. Underwood then tore the mask off of his own face, revealing streaks of the green coloring. A matte of the scene was then cut and various fire effects were placed into Underwood's face via green screen technology. In order to make the "cracks" appear, digital technology was created to "smooth over" the skin and then slowly reveal the pre-cut slits. Producer Paul Rabwin later joked that Underwood "had fire for brains".

== Reception ==
"Empedocles" first aired on Fox on April 22, 2001. The episode earned a Nielsen household rating of 7.3, meaning that it was seen by 7.3% of the nation's estimated households. The episode was seen by 12.46 million viewers. The episode ranked as the 40th most-watched episode for the week ending April 22. The episode subsequently aired in the United Kingdom on the BBC Two on July 28, 2002.

Critical reception to the episode was mostly mixed. Robert Shearman, in his book Wanting to Believe: A Critical Guide to The X-Files, Millennium & The Lone Gunmen, rated the episode three-and-a-half stars out of five. The author noted that the "X-File in itself is an interesting concept, but [it is] left frustratingly vague." Shearman, however, did positively write that the episode is "a character study which gives its new leads some background and depth and, better yet, somewhere new to develop." Emily St. James later awarded the episode a "C+" and wrote that "there are a lot of things to like in "Empedocles," but the central conceit is just too stupid for the episode as a whole to work." While she enjoyed the "way that [the episode] features all four FBI agents in the same episode", she was critical of both the plot and the Mulder and Scully dynamic, noting that it fell flat.

Paula Vitaris from Cinefantastique gave the episode a negative review and awarded it one-and-a-half stars out of four. She criticized several of the plot points in the episode, most notably how a "big-city" New Orleans detective could mistake Marilyn Manson CDs as signs of blatant satanic imagery. Vitaris further criticized the "sidelined" behavior of Scully and the "shoehorned" characterization of Reyes. Tom Kessenich, in his book Examinations, wrote a largely negative review of the episode. He criticized the downsized role Mulder and Scully played in the episode, noting that they had been "reduced to mere footnotes". Furthermore, Kessenich reasoned that, by trying to "prep for [a] future" of just Doggett and Reyes and "[connect] to the past" with Mulder and Scully, the episode ultimately "served to remind us how Doggett and Reyes pale in comparison to the magic of Mulder and Scully."

== Bibliography ==
- Hurwitz, Matt; Knowles, Chris (2008). The Complete X-Files. Insight Editions. ISBN 978-1933784809.
- Kessenich, Tom (2002). Examination: An Unauthorized Look at Seasons 6–9 of the X-Files. Trafford Publishing. ISBN 1553698126.
- Shearman, Robert (2009). Wanting to Believe: A Critical Guide to The X-Files, Millennium & The Lone Gunmen. Mad Norwegian Press. ISBN 978-0975944691.

This article incorporates material derived from the "Empedocles" article on the X-Files wiki at Fandom (formerly Wikia) and is licensed under the Creative Commons Attribution-Share Alike 3.0 License (April 26, 2012).
