= Alexander Gemignani =

American actor and musician (born 1979)

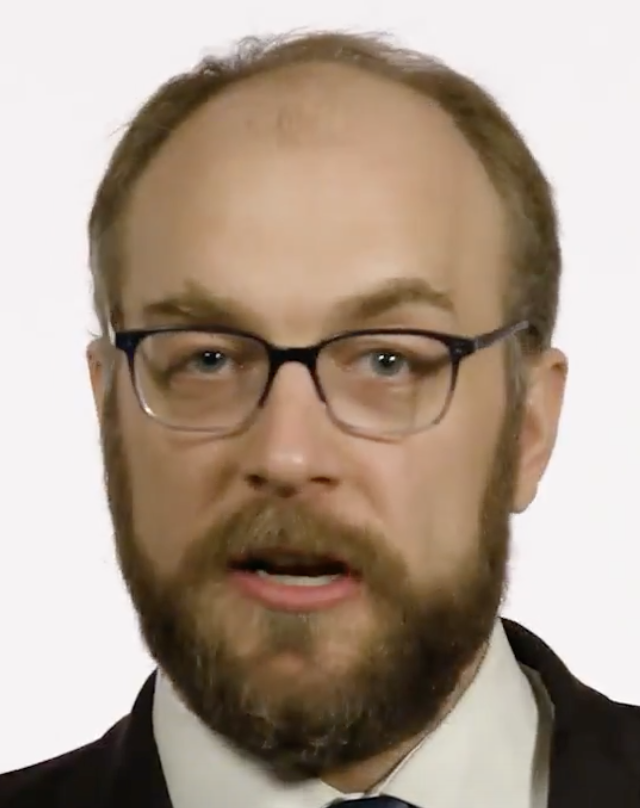
- Gemignani in May 2018
- Born: 3 July 1979 (age 46); New Jersey
- Occupation(s): Actor, musician, conductor
- Years active: 2000-present

Alexander Cesare Gemignani (born July 3, 1979) is an American actor, tenor, musician, and conductor, known for his work on Broadway. He was nominated for a Tony Award for his performance in Carousel and a Drama Desk Award for his performance in Sweeney Todd: The Demon Barber of Fleet Street.

== Early and personal life ==
Gemignani is the son of Broadway musical director Paul Gemignani and soprano Carolann Page. He was raised in Tenafly, New Jersey and graduated from Tenafly High School in 1997. He is a graduate of the University of Michigan's Musical Theater Department.

Gemignani was married in August 2008 to actor/director Erin Ortman.

== Career ==
Gemignani is known for his roles in Broadway musicals, including Assassins, Sweeney Todd: The Demon Barber of Fleet Street, Les Misérables, Sunday in the Park with George, and Carousel, receiving a Tony Award nomination for the latter. His film and television credits include The Producers, The Good Wife, Homeland, Chicago Fire, Empire, and The Marvelous Mrs. Maisel (recurring as Janusz, the eventual husband of the Weissmans’ maid, Zelda).

Gemignani participated in a memorable performance of "Opening Doors" from Merrily We Roll Along at Symphony Space's Wall to Wall Sondheim event celebrating Stephen Sondheim's 75th birthday in March 2005. He also performed in three gala concerts honoring Sondheim's 80th birthday in 2010: with the New York Philharmonic at Avery Fisher Hall, singing "Something's Coming" from West Side Story in March; then at New York City Center in April; and with The New York Pops at Carnegie Hall in November. He performed "Buddy's Blues" from Follies in the online 90th birthday celebration Take Me To The World on April 26, 2020. He made his conducting debut with the New York Philharmonic in Live from Lincoln Center's New Year's Eve: Celebrating Sondheim on December 31, 2019.

Recently, Gemignani has begun to work as a music director, following in his father's footsteps. He served as the conductor, music director, and music supervisor for the 2020 revival of West Side Story, and has developed pieces for the Public Theatre and the Roundabout Theatre Company. He served as music director and orchestrator for the Fiasco Theatre production of Merrily We Roll Along. He is the artistic director of both the Eugene O'Neill Theater Center's National Music Theater Conference as well as the American Music Theatre Project at Northwestern University. He is also an educator and is an associate professor at Northwestern University.

== Theatre credits ==
Year	Show	Role	Notes
2001	South Pacific	Ensemble	Benedum Center
2004	Assassins	John Hinckley	Broadway: Theatre World Award
2004	Passion	Private Augenti	Broadway Concert
2005	Passion	Lieutenant Torasso	Lincoln Center
2005	South Pacific	Stewpot	Carnegie Hall
2005-2006	Sweeney Todd: The Demon Barber of Fleet Street	Beadle Bamford	Broadway: Drama Desk Award for Outstanding Featured Actor in a Musical nomination
2006-2007	Les Misérables	Jean Valjean	Broadway
2007	Sweeney Todd: The Demon Barber of Fleet Street	Sweeney Todd	US Tour
2008	Sunday in the Park with George	Boatman / Dennis	Broadway
2008	Road Show	Addison Mizner	Off-Broadway
2011	The People in the Picture	Moishe Rosenwald	Broadway
2011	The Boys From Syracuse	Police Sergeant	Sidney Harman Hall
2012	Headstrong	Nick Merritt	Ensemble Studio Theatre
2012	Assassins	John Hinckley	Broadway Concert
2013	Chicago	Billy Flynn	Broadway
2014	Violet	The Father	Broadway
2015	Chicago	Billy Flynn	Broadway
2015	Oklahoma!	Jud Fry	The Muny
2016	1776	Edward Rutledge	Encores!
2016-2017	Hamilton	King George III	CIBC Theatre
2018	Carousel	Enoch Snow	Broadway: Tony Award for Best Featured Actor in a Musical and Grammy Award for Best Musical Theater Album nominations
2019	My Fair Lady	Alfred P. Doolittle	Broadway
2023	Big Fish	Edward Bloom	Marriott Theatre
2024	Inherit the Wind	Matthew Harrison Brady	Goodman Theatre
2024	Follies	Benjamin Stone	Carnegie Hall
2025	Big Fish	Amos Calloway	Workshop
2025	The Rink	Lino / Lenny / Uncle Fausto	Off-Broadway Concert
