= Ron Canada =

American actor (born 1949)

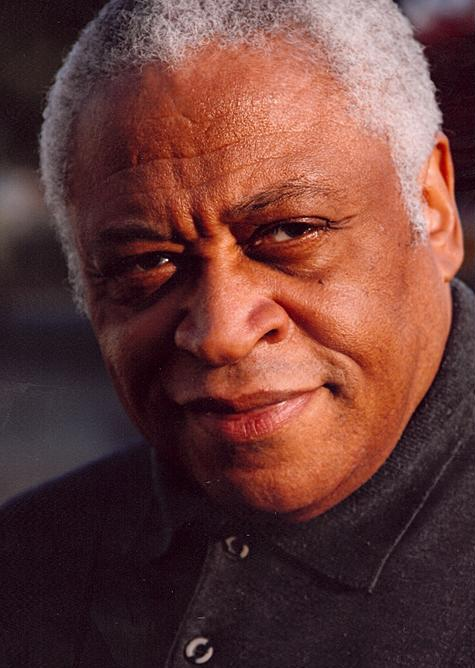
- Canada in 2009
- Born: Ronald Ellis Canada; May 3, 1949 (age 77); New York City, United States
- Occupations: Actor, producer
- Years active: 1971–present

Ronald Ellis Canada (born May 3, 1949) is an American actor and producer, with a specialty in portraying judges and detectives. He is best known for One on One (2001–2004), The Shield (2003–2004), and Lone Star (1996).

== Early life ==
Canada was born in New York City on May 3, 1949. Following completion of the Michele Clark broadcast journalism program at Columbia University, under the guidance of producer Fred Friendly, Canada commenced his career as a television news reporter in 1971 at WBAL-TV. In 1974, he began his three-year tenure at WJLA-TV in Washington, D.C. For his work in the nation's capital, Canada was nominated twice for Regional Emmy Awards, receiving the award in 1977. The following year he received an A.P. Award for Outstanding Reporting. While making the career transition he worked part-time as a broadcaster for Voice of America. He studied acting at The Folger Theatre Group under the tutelage of Franchelle Stewart Dorn. He moved from D.C. to New York in 1985.

== Career ==
Canada became the second actor to play the role of Troy Maxson in August Wilson's Fences at the GeVa Theatre in Rochester, New York (January 1986).

Canada has had a long career in both television and film, known primarily for his work in Cinderella Man, Wedding Crashers, and his recurring role as Under Secretary of State Ted Barrow on The West Wing. In 1996, Canada received the Dallas Film Critics Award and significant national attention for his performance as Otis Payne in John Sayles's film Lone Star.

He played the role of Iago in a "photo negative" version of Shakespeare's Othello at the Shakespeare Theatre Company in Washington, D.C. Other notable stage credits include his role as Emmet Tate in Zooman and the Sign at New York's Signature Theatre and originating the role of Duncan Troy in Headstrong at the Ensemble Studio Theatre, which earned him an Audelco Award nomination as Best Supporting Actor. Off Broadway - In Old Age - playing Azell Abernathy, at New York Theatre Workshop, N.Y.C Broadway play - Network - with Bryan Cranston, Tony Goldwyn, and Tatiana Maslany. Canada portrayed UBS network chieftain Edward George Ruddy.

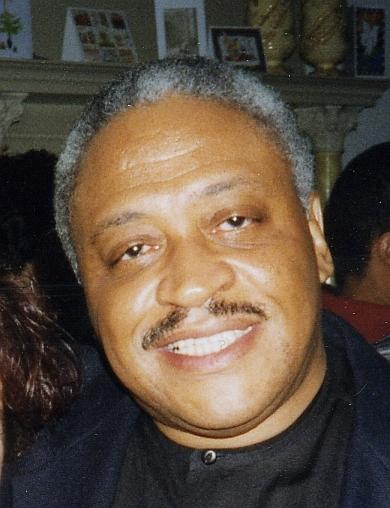
Canada in 1997

== Filmography ==
=== Film ===
Title	Year	Role	Note
1983	The Man Who Wasn't There	Barker	
1983	D.C. Cab	Police Officer #4	
1986	Good to Go	Stooper	
1987	Adventures in Babysitting	Graydon	
1987	Heart	Talk Show Guest	
1988	Arthur 2: On the Rocks	Bartender	
1990	Downtown	Lowell Harris	
1990	The Last of the Finest	Cregan	
1992	Honey, I Blew Up the Kid	U.S. Marshal Preston Brooks	
1992	Play Nice	Coroner	
1992	Home Alone 2: Lost in New York	Cop in Times Square	
1993	Barbarians at the Gate	Vernon Jordan	
1994	Getting Even with Dad	Zinn	
1994	Without Warning	Terrence Freeman	
1995	Man of the House	Bob Younger	
1995	Above Suspicion	Captain Lindsay	
1995	The American President	Lloyd	
1996	Lone Star	Otis "Big O" Payne	
1996	Pinocchio's Revenge	Barry	
1998	Nick Fury: Agent of SHIELD	Gabe Jones	TV movie
1998	Park Day	Mr. Joseph Johnson	
1999	In Too Deep	Dr. Bratton	
2000	Death of a Dog	Hassan	
2001	Thank Heaven	Joseph Johnson	
2003	The United States of Leland	Elden	
2003	The Hunted	FBI Special Agent-in-Charge Harry Van Zandt	
2003	The Human Stain	Herb Keble	
2004	National Treasure	Guard Woodruff	
2005	Cinderella Man	Joe Jeanette	
2005	Wedding Crashers	Randolph, the Clearys' Butler	
2005	Just Like Heaven	Dr. Walsh	
2006	Islander	T. Hardy	
2006	Paved with Good Intentions	Garrett Balden	
2007	Snowglobe	Antonio Moreno	
2008	Ocean of Pearls	Dr. William Ballard	
2008	Noble Things	Moses	
2008	The Haunting of Molly Hartley	Mr. Bennett	
2009	Bob Funk	Smiley	
2012	Lake Effect	Winchester	
2013	Life Tracker	Uriel Patterson	
2014	Child of Grace	Doctor	
2015	Ted 2	Judge Matheson	
2015	Gold Peak Tea: Take Me Home Contest	Voice	Video short
2015	After Words	Nelson	
2017	The Discovery	Cooper	
2017	Crown Heights	Judge Marcy	
2018	Bully	Mr. 'Action' Jackson	
2020	Frederick Douglass Boulevard aka Food & Drink Boulevard aka FDB	Karl	Short film
2020	The Empty Man	Detective Villiers	
2021	The Kinjiku	Gerome	Short film

=== Television ===
Year	Title	Role	Note
1989	Dallas	Dave Wallace	
1990	Cheers	Agent Munson	
1991	Stat	Anderson "Mary" Roche	
1992	A Different World	Grover James	
1992	Star Trek: The Next Generation	Martin Benbeck	Episode: "The Masterpiece Society"
1992	Doogie Howser, M.D.	Officer Wilbur	
1992	L.A. Law	David Ellis	
1993	NYPD Blue	Zeke Odell	
1994	Murphy Brown	Sergeant Foley	Episode: "Crime Story"
1994	Babylon 5	Capt. Ellis Pierce	Episode: "A Voice in the Wilderness, part 2"
1995	Living Single	Lanny Freedan	
1995	Family Matters	Dave McClure	Episode: "Walking My Baby Back Home"
1996	Star Trek: Deep Space Nine	Ch'Pok	Episode: "Rules of Engagement"
1996	Murder One	Judge Orrin Bell	
1996–1997	Tracey Takes On...	Lawrence	Episodes: "Health" and "Fantasy"
1997	Due South	Franco Devlin	Episode: "Mountie and Soul"
1999	Star Trek: Voyager	Fesek	Episode: "Juggernaut"
2000	City of Angels	Dr. Ethan Carter	
2001–2004	One on One	Richard Barnes (father of Flex)	
2001	The X-Files	Det. Franklin Potter	Episode: "Empedocles"
2001-2002	Philly	Judge Henry Griffin	
2002	Frasier	Judge Anderson	Episode: "The Ring Cycle"
2003–2004	The Shield	LAPD Chief of Police Tom Bankston	
2003–2006	The West Wing	Under Secretary of State Theodore Barrow	
2003	CSI: Crime Scene Investigation	Gerry Barone	Episode: "Fight Night"
2004–2005	Jack & Bobby	Adult Marcus Ride	
2006	Weeds	Joseph	
2006	7th Heaven	Dr. Sergey Barker	
2006–2007	Ugly Betty	Senator Slater	
2006–2008	Boston Legal	Judge Willard Reese	
2007	Stargate SG-1	Quartus	
2008	Law & Order	Mr. Fuller	Episode: "Bottomless"
2009	The Mentalist	Philip Raimey	Episode: "Red Scare"
2011	Let's Stay Together	Garrison Lawrence	
2011	The Closer	Judge Gerald Blake	Episode: "Fresh Pursuit"
2013	The Office	Mr. Haskins	Episode: "The Farm"
2013	Blue Bloods	Deputy Director Tom Mason	
2014	Elementary	Mr Rose	Episode: "The Hound of the Cancer Cells"
2014	Grimm	Stan Kingston	
2015	The Strain	Mayor George Lyle	
2015	The Affair	Judge Polk	2.4
2016	Madam Secretary	Cameroonian Ambassador Jean Aissatou	Episode: "Desperate Remedies"
2017	Designated Survivor	Reverend Dale	
2017	The Good Fight	Andrew Hart	Episodes: "Not So Grand Jury" and "The Schtup List"
2017–2019	The Orville	Admiral Tucker	Episodes: "Sanctuary", "Majority Rule" and "Command Performance"
2018	Bull	Judge Miles Skurnick	Episode: "Survival Instincts"
2018	Seven Seconds	Pastor Adler	
2018	Tom Clancy's Jack Ryan	D.N.I. Bobby Vig	
2018	House of Cards	Vincent Abruzzo	Episode 67, 68 & 72
2022	Law & Order: Special Victims Unit	Coleman Green	Episode: "Tangled Strands of Justice"
2022	The Best Man: The Final Chapters	Wellington	Episodes: "Paradise", "The Wedding", and "The Invisible Man"
2022–2023	East New York	Maurice Haywood	Episodes: "Snapped", "Pound of Flesh", "In the Bag"
2023	Girls5eva	Dana Wiggens	Episode: "Clarksville"
2023	Wu-Tang: An American Saga	Uncle Sy	Episodes: "A Better Tomorrow"
2025	The Irrational	Eli Mercer	Episode: "Ghost Ship"

=== Commercials ===
Year	Title	Role
2016	Gold Peak Tea: Home Brew Delivery	Voice
2016	Gold Peak Tea: Take Me Home	Voice

=== Radio ===
Year	Title	Role
2021	Marvel's Wastelanders: Hawkeye	Abner Jenkins / Beetle

=== Video games ===
Title	Year	Role	Note
2004	Ground Control II: Operation Exodus	Drahk'Mar Vicath	Voice
