= List of roles and awards of Jenna Ortega =

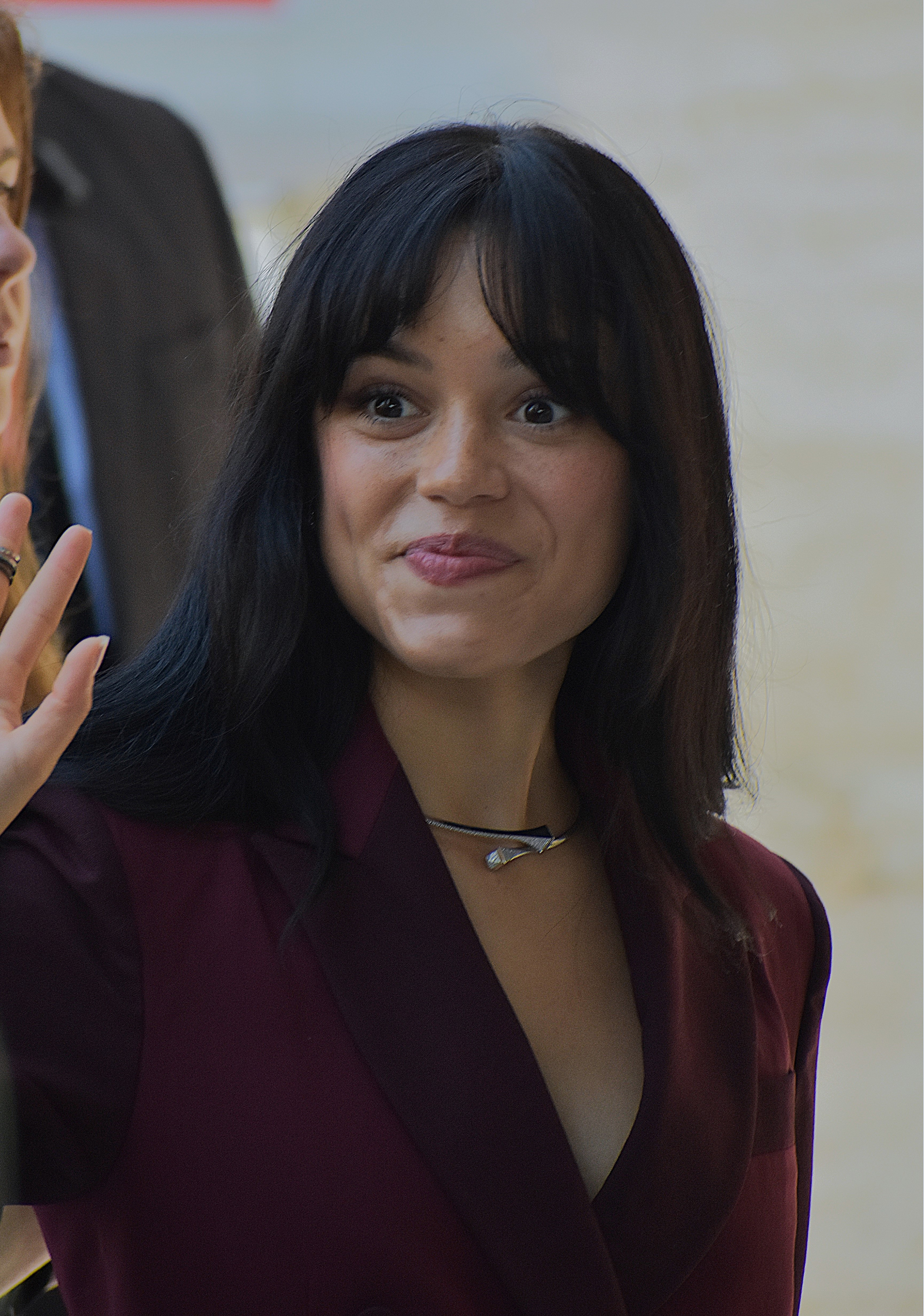
Ortega at the Beetlejuice Beetlejuice film premiere at the 2024 Venice International Film Festival

Jenna Ortega is an American actress. She began acting at the age of nine and, after a series of minor television roles, made her acting debut in an episode of the sitcom Rob (2012). She earned recognition for playing a younger version of Jane in The CW comedy-drama series Jane the Virgin (2014–2019) and Harley Diaz in the Disney Channel series Stuck in the Middle (2016–2018). The latter won her an Imagen Award for Best Young Television Actor. She also appeared in the Marvel film Iron Man 3 (2013) and the horror film Insidious: Chapter 2 (2013).

Ortega began transitioning to mature projects after Stuck in the Middle, beginning with a starring role as Ellie Alves in the Netflix series You (2019). She built her profile with roles in the comedy horror film The Babysitter: Killer Queen (2020), the family comedy film Yes Day (2021), and the drama film The Fallout (2021), with her performance as a traumatized high school student in the latter earning critical acclaim.

Ortega rose to wider prominence as a scream queen after co-starring in the successful slasher films Scream (2022), X (2022), and Scream VI (2023). She gained international recognition and critical plaudits for her portrayal of Wednesday Addams in the Netflix horror comedy series Wednesday (2022–present), for which she received nominations at the Golden Globe, Primetime Emmy, and Screen Actors Guild awards. She has since starred in the blockbuster fantasy film Beetlejuice Beetlejuice (2024).

== Filmography ==
=== Film ===
Key
†	Denotes films that have not yet been released

Year	Title	Role	Notes	Ref.
2013	Iron Man 3	Vice President's daughter		
2013	Insidious: Chapter 2	Annie		
2014	The Little Rascals Save the Day	Mary Ann	Direct-to-video	
2015	After Words	Anna Chapa		
2018	Saving Flora	Dawn		
2019	Wyrm	Suzie		
2020	The Babysitter: Killer Queen	Phoebe Atwell		
2021	Yes Day	Katerina "Katie" Torres		
2021	The Fallout	Vada Cavell		
2022	Scream	Tara Carpenter		
2022	Studio 666	Skye Willow		
2022	X	Lorraine Day		
2022	American Carnage	Camila Montes		
2023	Scream VI	Tara Carpenter		
2023	Finestkind	Mabel		
2024	Miller's Girl	Cairo Sweet		
2024	Winter Spring Summer or Fall	Remi Aguilar		
2024	Beetlejuice Beetlejuice	Astrid Deetz		
2025	Death of a Unicorn	Ridley Kintner	Also executive producer	
2025	Hurry Up Tomorrow	Anima	Also executive producer	
2026	The Gallerist	Kiki Gorman	Also executive producer	
2026	Klara and the Sun	Klara		
2027	The Great Beyond †		Post-production	

=== Television ===
Year	Title	Role	Notes	Ref.
2012	Rob	Girl	Episode: "The Baby Bug"	
2012	CSI: NY	Aimee Moore	Episode: "Unspoken"	
2013	Days of Our Lives	Hayley	Episode: "12062"	
2014	Rake	Zoe Leon	Recurring role; 7 episodes	
2014	Over the Garden Wall	Additional voices	Voice role; episode: "Babes in the Wood"	
2014–2019	Jane the Virgin	Young Jane Villanueva (age 12)	Recurring role; 30 episodes	
2015	Richie Rich	Darcy	Main role; 21 episodes	
2016	Elena and the Secret of Avalor	Princess Isabel	Voice role; television film	
2016–2018	Stuck in the Middle	Harley Diaz	Main role; 57 episodes	
2016–2020	Elena of Avalor	Princess Isabel	Voice role; 39 episodes	
2018	Bizaardvark	Izzy	Episode: "The BFF (Before Frankie Friend)"	
2019	You	Ellie Alves	Main role (season 2); 10 episodes	
2019–2023	Big City Greens	Gabriella Espinosa	Voice role; 6 episodes	
2020	Home Movie: The Princess Bride	Princess Buttercup	Episode: "Chapter Six: The Fire Swamp"	
2020–2022	Jurassic World Camp Cretaceous	Brooklynn	Voice role; 48 episodes	
2022–present	Wednesday	Wednesday Addams / Goody Addams	Main role; also producer (season 2)	
2023	Saturday Night Live	Herself	Host; episode: "Jenna Ortega / The 1975"	

=== Music videos ===
Year	Title	Artist	Ref.
2017	"Chapstick"	Jacob Sartorius	
2024	"Taste"	Sabrina Carpenter	
2025	"Drive"	The Weeknd	
2025	"Mona Lisa"	Elias Rønnenfelt	

== Awards and nominations ==
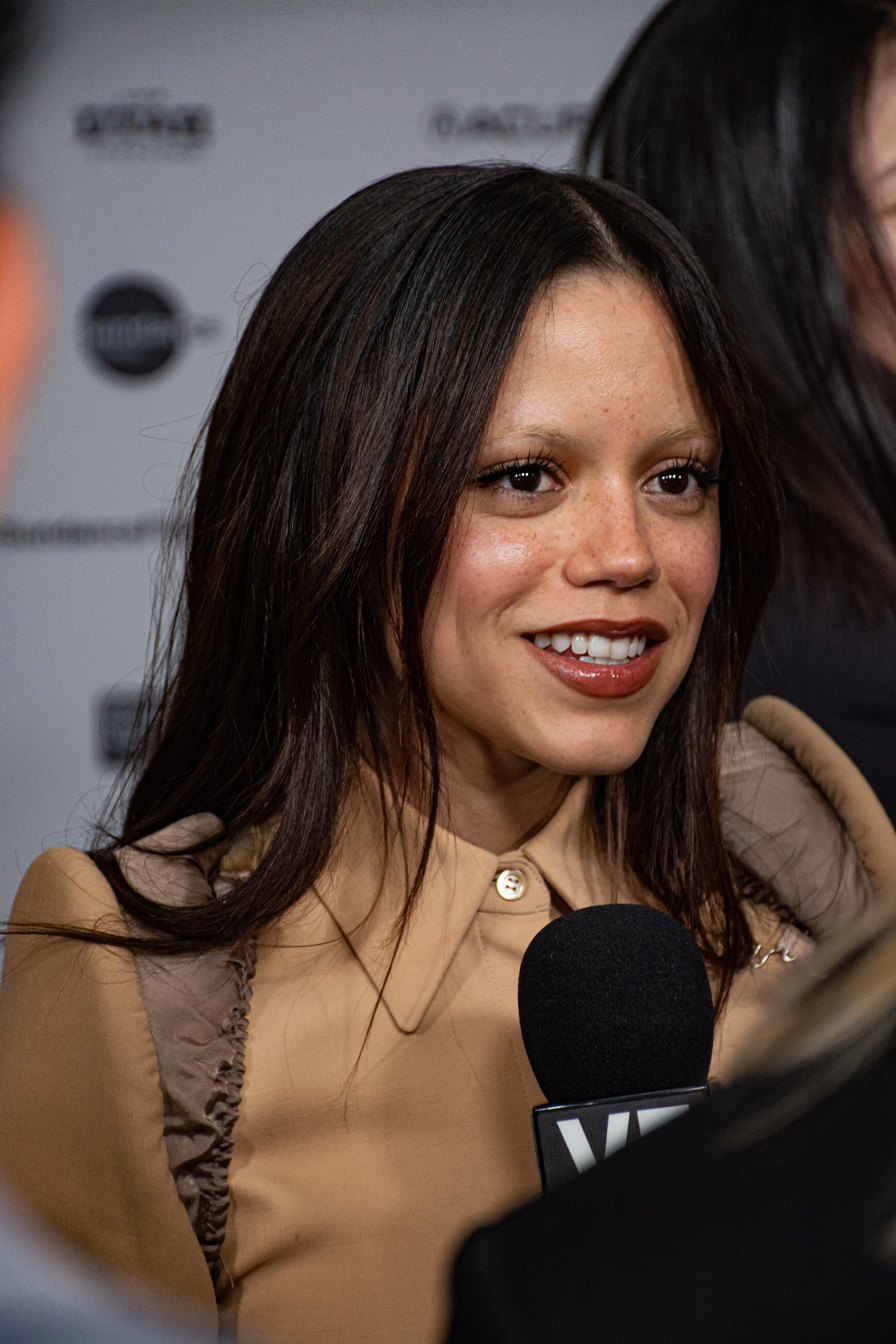
Ortega at the premiere of The Gallerist at the 2026 Sundance Film Festival

Awards and nominations received by Jenna Ortega
Award	Year (Note: Indicates the year of ceremony. Each year is linked to the article about the awards held that year, wherever possible.)	Category	Nominated work	Result	Ref.
AACTA Awards	2024	Audience Choice Favourite Actress	—	Nominated	
Austin Film Critics Association Awards	2023	The Robert R. "Bobby" McCurdy Memorial Breakthrough Artist Award	The Fallout, Scream, X, and Studio 666	Won	
Critics' Choice Super Awards	2023	Best Actress in a Horror Series	Wednesday	Won	
Critics' Choice Super Awards	2024	Best Actress in a Horror Movie	Scream VI	Nominated	
Dorian Awards	2023	Rising Star Award	—N/a	Nominated	
Fangoria Chainsaw Awards	2023	Best Supporting Performance	Scream	Nominated	
Golden Globe Awards	2023	Best Actress in a Television Series – Musical or Comedy	Wednesday	Nominated	
Golden Globe Awards	2026	Best Actress in a Television Series – Musical or Comedy	Wednesday	Nominated	
Hollywood Critics Association Midseason Film Awards	2022	Best Actress	The Fallout	Nominated	
Imagen Awards	2016	Best Young Actor – Television	Stuck in the Middle	Nominated	
Imagen Awards	2018	Best Young Actor – Television	Stuck in the Middle	Won	
Imagen Awards	2019	Best Young Actor – Television	Stuck in the Middle	Nominated	
Imagen Awards	2021	Best Actress – Feature Film	Yes Day	Nominated	
Imagen Awards	2023	Best Actress – Comedy (Television)	Wednesday	Won	
MTV Movie & TV Awards	2022	Most Frightened Performance	Scream	Won	
MTV Movie & TV Awards	2023	Best Performance in a Show	Wednesday	Won	
MTV Movie & TV Awards	2023	Best Hero	Wednesday	Nominated	
MTV Movie & TV Awards	2023	Best Duo (Note: Shared with Thing)	Wednesday	Nominated	
Nickelodeon Kids' Choice Awards	2023	Favorite Female TV Star (Family)	Wednesday	Won	
Nickelodeon Kids' Choice Awards	2025	Favorite Movie Actress	Beetlejuice Beetlejuice	Nominated	
Nickelodeon Kids' Choice Awards	2026	Favorite Female TV Star (Family)	Wednesday	Won	
People's Choice Awards	2024	The Drama Movie Star of the Year	Scream VI	Won	
Primetime Emmy Awards	2024	Outstanding Lead Actress in a Comedy Series	Wednesday	Nominated	
Saturn Awards	2024	Best Performance by a Younger Actor in a Television Series	Wednesday	Won	
Saturn Awards	2025	Best Performance by a Younger Actor	Beetlejuice Beetlejuice	Won	
Screen Actors Guild Awards	2023	Outstanding Performance by a Female Actor in a Comedy Series	Wednesday	Nominated	
Screen Actors Guild Awards	2026	Outstanding Performance by a Female Actor in a Comedy Series	Wednesday	Nominated	
