= The One with the Embryos =

- Friends episode
- Episode no.: Season 4 Episode 12
- Directed by: Kevin S. Bright
- Written by: Jill Condon & Amy Toomin
- Production code: 466611
- Original air date: January 15, 1998

Guest appearances
- Giovanni Ribisi as Frank Jr.; Debra Jo Rupp as Alice Knight; Cindy Katz as Dr. Zane

Episode chronology
← Previous "The One with Phoebe's Uterus"	Next → "The One with Rachel's Crush"
- Friends season 4

"The One with the Embryos" is the twelfth episode of Friends' fourth season. It first aired on the NBC network in the United States on January 15, 1998. In the episode, Phoebe (Lisa Kudrow) agrees to be the surrogate mother for her brother Frank Jr. (Giovanni Ribisi) and his older wife Alice Knight (Debra Jo Rupp). Meanwhile, a display by Chandler (Matthew Perry) and Joey (Matt LeBlanc) of how well they know Monica (Courteney Cox) and Rachel (Jennifer Aniston) by guessing the items in their shopping bag leads to a large-scale bet on a quiz, for which Ross (David Schwimmer) acts as the gamemaster.

The episode was directed by Kevin S. Bright and co-written by Jill Condon and Amy Toomin. The idea for Kudrow's character Phoebe becoming a surrogate mother coincided with the actress' real-time pregnancy. The producers wanted to find a way to use the pregnancy in a narrative for the fourth season and designated the task to the writers. Ribisi and Rupp reprised their recurring roles of Frank Jr. and Alice respectively which was initially difficult as both had filming commitments.

In its original broadcast on NBC, "The One with the Embryos" acquired a 17.3 Nielsen rating, finishing the week ranked fourth. The episode received critical acclaim, is generally considered one of the best of the entire series, and is a favorite amongst the cast members and producers. In 2009, "The One with the Embryos" was ranked #21 on TV Guide's list of "TV's Top 100 Episodes of All Time."

== Plot ==
Rachel (Jennifer Aniston) and Monica (Courteney Cox) are woken up too early in the morning by Joey (Matt LeBlanc) and Chandler's (Matthew Perry) chick and duck, as the maturing chick has just begun crowing. Later, as Rachel returns with her shopping and complains to the others about the situation, Phoebe (Lisa Kudrow) urges the boys to get rid of their birds as they should not be living in an apartment.

As Phoebe leaves for her doctor's appointment to get her brother Frank (Giovanni Ribisi) and his older wife Alice's (Debra Jo Rupp) embryo transferred into her uterus, Monica and Joey have an argument after Joey boasts that he and Chandler know more about Rachel and her than vice versa. Chandler backs Joey up, and the two correctly identify the contents of Rachel's shopping bag. Monica suggests a trivia contest to see who knows more about whom: the men or the women. They place a $100 bet on the outcome and Ross (David Schwimmer) puts together some questions and plays as host.

Meanwhile, Phoebe learns that the doctor will implant five of Frank and Alice's embryos into her uterus, which only has a 25% chance of success. She offers to do this as many times as possible for them, but is concerned when the two reveal that they are paying $16,000, which is all of their savings, for the single IVF procedure, and is helpless to influence the results.

The trivia game begins, with various facts about the characters being revealed such as Joey's space-cowboy imaginary friend (Maurice) and Rachel's actual favorite movie (Weekend at Bernie's). A nine-all score leads to a lightning round. Monica raises the stakes: If the women win, Joey and Chandler must give up their birds. Chandler rebuts by suggesting Rachel and Monica give up their apartment to them, which Monica immediately agrees to without consulting Rachel. The girls lose the lightning round because they cannot identify Chandler's job, and the boys win.

As the four pack up their respective apartments—Rachel, in particular, displeased about having to switch—Phoebe returns home and takes a pregnancy test, though it is too soon for a result, so she sits in the apartment for several hours waiting for another result. Later with packing complete, Rachel finally refuses to move as Frank and Alice come by with another pregnancy test. The boys and the girls begin to argue along with Ross, which is cut short when Phoebe emerges from the bathroom and joyfully announces she is pregnant, the mood turning to one of celebration.

The tag scene shows Rachel and Monica horrified at having to deal with living in Chandler and Joey's cramped and dirty apartment, while the boys are content to live in the girls' large apartment.

== Production ==
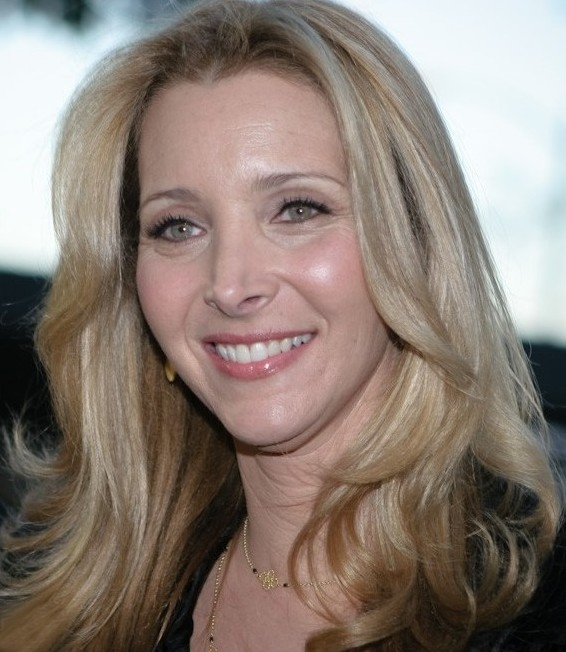
Lisa Kudrow's pregnancy inspired the story arc for her character Phoebe to become a surrogate mother.

"The One with the Embryos" was co-written by Jill Condon and Amy Toomin and directed by Kevin S. Bright. In October 1997, Lisa Kudrow announced she and her husband Michel Stern were expecting their first child. When Marta Kauffman first learned of Kudrow's pregnancy, she was overjoyed and wanted to find a solution of incorporating it into the show without choosing to cover up. At the time of filming "The One with the Embryos" in December, Kudrow was four months pregnant and the writers discussed ways of narrating the pregnancy on the show, settling with Kudrow's character carrying her brother's embryos.

According to David Crane, the story arc with Phoebe carrying Frank and Alice's baby was considered "risky". When the plot was first discussed, the main concern was whether it was "too crazy … where's the line with Phoebe?". Crane felt if it were not for the actors, the storyline would not have been believable. The producers found it difficult to get Giovanni Ribisi to reprise his role as Frank Jr. on a longer-term basis because the actor had continuous filming commitments. A similar situation occurred with Debra Jo Rupp, who was named as a cast member in the upcoming period sitcom, That '70s Show on the Fox network.

The chick and the duck, who first appeared in "The One with a Chick and a Duck" as Chandler and Joey's pets were used "as a spark" for the main plot. The animals were originally intended for one episode but because the producers believed they got "so much mileage out of them", they made recurring appearances. As many television shows used similar fictional pets, the producers settled on a chicken and a duck as they were different.

The idea for the trivia contest came up in the writers' room, partially based on a real game that writer Seth Kurland watched his friends play. The "Miss Chanandler Bong" joke was inspired by an incident from Kurland's childhood when his surname was misspelled on an address label.

Kauffman told TV Guide the writers felt it was important that the trivia contest reveal new information about the characters "otherwise it's just exposition." The answer "Viva Las Gay-gas" in response to 'What is the name of Chandler's dad's show in Vegas?' changed "about a million times" in drafts according to Crane. On the night the show was being filmed, writers continued to pitch for different answers in order to receive a better response from the audience. The staff found it difficult coming up with different points of view for each character as all wanted to win the game.

The writers decided to go through with the apartment switch to avoid creating fake stakes, which they called "schmuck bait". "The discussion was if we do it, we have to stick to it," Crane said. There was never discussion of changing the look of either apartment because "the fun of it was that they were in spaces they 'shouldn't' be in," according to Bright.

== Reception ==
In its original airing, "The One with the Embryos" finished fourth in ratings for the week of January 12–January 18, 1998, with a Nielsen rating of 17.3, equivalent to approximately 16.8 million viewing households. It was the fourth highest-rated show on NBC that week, following ER, Seinfeld and Veronica's Closet–all of which aired on the network's Thursday night Must See TV lineup.

"The One with the Embryos" was Courteney Cox and Matt LeBlanc's favorite episode of the series. Cox liked the episode because she enjoys playing Monica at her most competitive, while LeBlanc spoke fondly of the pace of the episode and the information about the characters that came out. He identified scenes that featured just the six core cast as the best, "because you don't have to introduce a character—you don't have to lay any pipeline—you just get right to the funny". On the DVD audio commentary for the episode, Marta Kauffman cited the episode being "so much fun to do" and enjoyed the writing process. The scene involving Phoebe talking to the embryos was Kevin S. Bright's favorite in the show's history because of Kudrow's ability to "draw you into the scene ... even though it's only her talking to the dish". David Crane highlights how the episode explores generosity; doing a selfless act which pays off when Phoebe gives birth in "The One Hundredth". Bright moreover felt the trivia contest was the catalyst that rejuvenated the entire fourth season and "put Friends in a different place".

In a 2001 review, Entertainment Weekly rated the episode A+, stating that "Thanks to the trivia contest alone, Embryos is quite possibly Friends' finest moment". The article singles out Rachel's line "He's a transpon—transpondster!" (in response to the question "What is Chandler Bing's job?") as the best line of the episode. The authors of Friends Like Us: The Unofficial Guide to Friends called it a "sure-fire contender for the best episode of all time ... not one to be missed under any circumstances". In 2004, Tara Ariano of MSNBC.com wrote that the character trivia is "revealed in a manner completely organic to the plot. Beautifully written and acted, 'The One With The Embryos' encapsulates the whole series in a single episode". The episode was ranked #21 on TV Guide's list of "TV's Top 100 Episodes of All Time".

In a 2018 oral history marking the episode's 20th anniversary, TV Guide declared it the series' best episode and "Friends at its peak, a lightning-in-a-bottle gem." Kauffman said she hopes "the episode's legacy is what people would say about the series, which is it's really funny and real and sweet."

== Merchandise ==
The episode was released as part of Friends: The Complete Fourth Season in Regions 1, 2 and 4. As part of the DVD release, "Who Knows Whom Best? – Ross's Ultimate Challenge" an interactive game was included, based on the quiz in "The One with the Embryos". The game uses clips from the show to provide answers, allows viewers to choose a team (boys or girls) and call the coin toss.
