= Juan Feldman =

- Born: September 16, 1972

Juan Feldman (born 16 September 1972) is a Uruguayan-born film producer and director who lives in California.

He started his film career almost by chance, as part of the crew of Curro Jiménez in Montevideo. Later he moved to California, where he engaged in film production.

== Filmography ==
- The Prey (2015) - executive producer
- After Words (2015) - director and producer
- Costa Rican Summer (2010) - producer
- Surf School (2006) - producer
- Death to the Supermodels (2005) - producer
