= Surf School =

2006 film by Joel Silverman

- Directed by: Joel Silverman
- Written by: Joel Silverman
- Produced by: Juan Feldman; Joel Silverman
- Starring: Corey Sevier; Laura Bell Bundy; Harland Williams
- Cinematography: Arturo Smith
- Edited by: Michael Alberts
- Production company: Surf School
- Distributed by: Slow Hand Releasing
- Release date: June 1, 2006
- Running time: 87 minutes
- Country: United States
- Language: English

Surf School is a 2006 American teen sex comedy written and directed by Joel Silverman and starring Corey Sevier, Laura Bell Bundy, Harland Williams, and Sisqó. The screenplay concerns a group of misfits who must learn to surf in one week so they can compete in the championships.

== Plot ==
After Jordan transfers from the East Coast to a California high school, he finds himself a social outcast because he cannot surf. Jordan organizes several other misfits into a team, and they set off for Costa Rica to learn how to surf from former surfing star Rip, who is now an alcoholic. With only one week until the championship begins, they must learn all they can from Rip in order to face the school bully, Tyler.

== Cast ==
- Corey Sevier as Jordan
- Laura Bell Bundy as Doris
- Harland Williams as Rip
- Sisqó as Mo
- Lee Norris as Larry
- Miko Hughes as Taz
- Eriko Tamura as Chika
- Taylor Negron as Boris
- Diane Delano as Tillie
- Ryan Carnes as Tyler
- Cheryl Harrington as Mofika

== Production ==
Shooting took place in Costa Rica.

== Release ==
Surf School premiered in Yuma, Arizona, home of executive producer Doyle McCurley, on June 1, 2006. Lionsgate released the film on DVD in the US on July 17, 2007.

== Reception ==
Reception has been negative. Phil Villarreal of the Arizona Daily Star called it "a dumb indie comedy that serves up various sex antics copied from copies of American Pie." Hock Teh of IGN rated it 1/10 stars and wrote that the film borrows the least funny elements from much better comedies. Noah Davis of PopMatters rated it 4/10 stars and wrote that it may play well to teenagers despite its faults. Nick Lyons of DVD Talk rated it 0.5/5 stars and called it a poor ripoff of American Pie. David Johnson of DVD Verdict wrote that it is clichéd and has a nonsensical plot, but it still has "a glimmer of intangible charm".
