= Three Words (The X-Files) =

- The X-Files episode
- The titular "Three Words": Fight the Future. The phrase is an important recurring motif in The X-Files universe and was the tagline for the 1998 film.
- Episode no.: Season 8 Episode 16
- Directed by: Tony Wharmby
- Written by: Chris Carter; Frank Spotnitz
- Production code: 8ABX18
- Original air date: April 8, 2001
- Running time: 44 minutes

Guest appearances
- Adam Baldwin as Knowle Rohrer; Joe Basile as Lead White House Guard; Tom Braidwood as Melvin Frohike; Gary Bristow as Howard Salt; Dean Haglund as Richard Langly; Bruce Harwood as John Fitzgerald Byers; Dwight Hicks as Armed Prison Guard; Nelson Mashita as Dr. Lim; JC Murad as FBI Guard On Intercom; James Pickens, Jr. as Deputy Director Alvin Kersh; Mitch Pileggi as Assistant Director Walter Skinner; Ric Sarabia as Marion; Judson Scott as Absalom

Episode chronology
| ← Previous "Deadalive" | Next → "Empedocles" |
- The X-Files season 8

"Three Words" is the sixteenth episode of the eighth season of the science fiction television series The X-Files. It first aired in the United States and Canada on April 8, 2001, on Fox. Written by executive producers Chris Carter and Frank Spotnitz, and directed by Tony Wharmby, it explores the series' overarching mythology. It earned a Nielsen rating of 7.6, was viewed by 10.46 million viewers, and received mixed to positive reviews from television critics.

The episode centers on FBI special agents Fox Mulder (David Duchovny), Dana Scully (Gillian Anderson) and John Doggett (Robert Patrick), who work on cases linked to the paranormal, called X-Files, following Mulder's return from the dead in the previous episode. When a man is gunned down on the White House lawn attempting to inform the president of a pending alien invasion, Mulder secretly conducts his own investigation, and believes Doggett is working to conceal the truth of alien colonization.

The episode signalled Mulder's forthcoming exit from the FBI, which was devised to allow the show to more easily focus on the characters of John Doggett and Monica Reyes in the following season. Duchovny declared he had been happy to see the series' focus shift to other characters.

== Plot ==
Under cover of darkness, an unidentified man jumps over the fence to the White House and is apprehended by the Secret Service. As he struggles with them, he pulls a gun and accidentally shoots himself. Bleeding on the ground, he hands over a computer disk, begging them to give it to the President. Three words are written on the disk: FIGHT THE FUTURE.

While still at the hospital, Fox Mulder (David Duchovny) recalls how he was tortured on the alien ship. Dana Scully (Gillian Anderson) enters with Dr. Lim and they give him surprisingly good news: the neurological condition that was killing him, before his disappearance, has disappeared and he is in perfect health. Mulder returns to his apartment with Scully and he congratulates her on the pregnancy she had sought for a long time. Meanwhile, in prison, an inmate librarian gives former UFO cult leader Absalom a book about the apocalypse. Hidden inside it is a newspaper article about the man who jumped the fence. Absalom later escapes during a work detail by attacking a guard.

At FBI Headquarters, Deputy Director Alvin Kersh informs John Doggett (Robert Patrick) and Walter Skinner (Mitch Pileggi) that Mulder has applied for reinstatement to the X-Files. He intends to deny the request, claiming a higher percentage of success with Doggett. Kersh ignores Doggett and Skinner's defenses of Mulder, perceiving him to be a crusader unfit for proper Bureau work. Doggett later finds Absalom waiting for him at home with a gun, demanding that Doggett show the back of his neck to confirm his identity. He tells Doggett that the man killed at the White House, Howard Salt, died for what he knew about an alien invasion.

Absalom duct tapes his gun to Doggett's back in a plan to get Salt's information, with Doggett used as a hostage. The two attempt to sneak into the census bureau's database, which Absalom claims contains data showing the aliens are already here. Unfortunately, the plan fails when an X-ray scanner detects the gun. Absalom is shot and killed by security. Mulder later accuses Doggett of deliberately attempting to cover up the truth by setting up Absalom to be killed, to which Doggett takes great offense. Doggett later meets with his liaison, Knowle Rohrer, who reveals the password to the census bureau is "Fight the Future."

Through Scully, Doggett gives the password to Mulder. Mulder breaks into the census bureau with the help of the Lone Gunmen, intending to transmit the data publicly. Doggett soon arrives, realizing that the password leak was a trap. After a bitter argument – and upon both Scully and the Gunmen revealing to Mulder the arrival of black ops mercenaries on the scene – they are forced to leave. Doggett confronts Rohrer about the setup, but Rohrer claims he was just trying to help Doggett learn the truth. As Doggett and Skinner leave, strange protrusions are seen at the back of Rohrer's neck.

== Production ==
"Three Words" was written by executive producers Chris Carter and Frank Spotnitz, directed by Tony Wharmby and saw Nelson Mashita reprise his role of Doctor Lim, having appeared in the previous episode "Deadalive". Judson Scott also made his third appearance in the series as cult leader Absalom, reprising the role from both "Deadalive" and "This Is Not Happening". The baseball field scene was filmed at Cheviot Hills Park, in Los Angeles; the park had previously been used in the sixth season episode "The Unnatural" and would be later re-used in the ninth season episode "Lord of the Flies".

In the episode, the returned Mulder's request to be reassigned to X-Files division is denied. As season eight was nearly over, the producers and writers decided to refuse Mulder re-admittance into the FBI as a way to segue John Doggett and Monica Reyes into the series as the new main stars of season nine. David Duchovny agreed with this method, noting, "I completely thought it was correct that they should be trying to focus elsewhere, and that, since I was going to come back for the second half of season eight, if you were to refocus on whatever Mulder's up to, you'd be in the same lousy situation at the beginning of season nine."

== Broadcast and reception ==
The episode first aired on Fox on April 8, 2001, earning a Nielsen household rating of 7.6, meaning that it was seen by 7.6% of the nation's estimated households. The episode was seen by 10.46 million viewers. The episode was later included on The X-Files Mythology, Volume 4 – Super Soldiers, a DVD collection that contains episodes involved with the alien super soldiers arc.

"Three Words" received mixed to positive reviews from critics. Robert Shearman, in his book Wanting to Believe: A Critical Guide to The X-Files, Millennium & The Lone Gunmen, rated the episode five stars out of five, calling it "extremely well-performed by all concerned." Shearman felt that the episode was similar to the earlier "Per Manum" and was somewhat formulaic; however, he noted that this was a necessary and positive step towards redefining the series after the changes made in its last two seasons: "The point of all this is only to emphasise how different The X-Files universe now feels, the familiarity of the ingredients only making us more aware that the mix is never going to be the same again".

Zack Handlen of The A.V. Club awarded the episode a "B+" and wrote that the episode, "finds Duchovny back on his feet and ready for action, and he brings a new energy to the part." He enjoyed the way the show presented the story as one wherein, "we spend as much time watching Mulder from the outside as we do seeing events from his perspective," because it "makes things interesting." Handlen also wrote that while the episode did not hit the emotional notes that its predecessor, "Deadalive", did, it was nonetheless "stronger plotwise" and built to an "inevitable conclusion in classic X-Files style".

Not all reviews were positive; Tom Kessenich, in his book Examinations, gave the episode a mixed review, writing, "This was an episode that had tremendous promise and Carter and Spotnitz almost got it right. Sadly, they failed to invest themselves fully and intelligently into Mulder's return." Paula Vitaris from Cinefantastique gave the episode a largely negative review and awarded it one-and-a-half stars out of four. Vitaris wrote that, despite opening "with tremendously affecting acting from [David] Duchovny", the episode lapses into "a lost opportunity to explore the psyche of a person who has suffered torture".

== Bibliography ==
- Fraga, Erica (2010). LAX-Files: Behind the Scenes with the Los Angeles Cast and Crew. CreateSpace. ISBN 9781451503418.
- Hurwitz, Matt; Knowles, Chris (2008). The Complete X-Files. Insight Editions. ISBN 978-1-933784-80-9.
- Kessenich, Tom (2002). Examination: An Unauthorized Look at Seasons 6–9 of the X-Files. Trafford Publishing. ISBN 1-55369-812-6.
- Shearman, Robert (2009). Wanting to Believe: A Critical Guide to The X-Files, Millennium & The Lone Gunmen. Mad Norwegian Press. ISBN 978-0-9759446-9-1.

This article incorporates material derived from the "Three Words" article on the X-Files wiki at Fandom (formerly Wikia) and is licensed under the Creative Commons Attribution-Share Alike 3.0 License (March 7, 2012).
