= The One After Ross Says Rachel =

- Friends episode
- Episode no.: Season 5 Episode 1
- Directed by: Kevin S. Bright
- Written by: Seth Kurland
- Production code: 467651
- Original air date: September 24, 1998

Guest appearances
- Helen Baxendale as Emily Waltham; Tom Conti as Stephen Waltham; Peter Eyre as Registrar; Elliott Gould as Jack Geller; Christina Pickles as Judy Geller; Jennifer Saunders as Andrea Waltham

Episode chronology
← Previous "The One with Ross's Wedding"	Next → "The One with All the Kissing"
- Friends season 5

"The One After Ross Says Rachel" is the first episode of Friends' fifth season, and the 98th episode overall. It first aired on NBC in the United States on September 24, 1998.

== Plot ==
After Ross accidentally says Rachel's name instead of Emily's during their wedding vows, a livid Emily agrees to continue with the ceremony but locks herself in the bathroom at their wedding reception, refusing to accept Ross' continual apologies. When Rachel talks to Ross about what has happened they agree that his saying "Rachel" was just a mistake, and there are no underlying romantic feelings. After realizing that Emily has escaped out the bathroom window, Ross searches for her in vain before deciding to wait for her at their hotel room. Instead, Emily's parents come to collect her things, and Ross convinces Mr Waltham (Tom Conti) to give Emily a message to meet him at the airport for their honeymoon.

Meanwhile, Monica and Chandler are afraid their friendship may suffer following their night together, before resolving to only continue a sexual relationship while in London. However, their efforts to have another sexual encounter are repeatedly disrupted by others in the hotel and by Joey on the return flight to New York City. After reuniting with a heavily pregnant Phoebe in Monica and Rachel's apartment, Chandler and Monica are left alone and amicably discuss how meaningful their London night was to them, eventually admitting they are attracted to one another. Despite their earlier agreement, they decide to continue sleeping together, justifying that they are still on "London time".

At the airport, Rachel, attempting to get a flight back to New York, runs into Ross, who is hoping Emily will join him for their honeymoon in Athens. Emily does not appear before the final boarding call is announced, so Ross invites Rachel to join him as a friend so he won't be alone. Rachel accepts, but just as the two board the plane, Emily arrives at the terminal and spots them together. Ross chases after her in distress, leaving Rachel on the flight to Athens by herself.

== Production ==
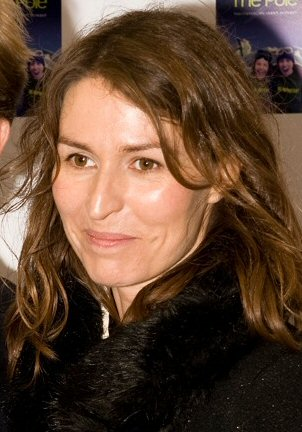
Helen Baxendale reprised her role as Emily Waltham in this episode.

"The One After Ross Says Rachel" was written by Seth Kurland and directed by series executive producer Kevin S. Bright. The episode originally aired in the United States on September 24, 1998, on NBC as the season premiere episode of the show's fifth season and the 98th overall episode of the series.

Helen Baxendale reprised her role as Emily Waltham, while Tom Conti and Jennifer Saunders reprise guest appearances as her parents, Stephen and Andrea Waltham. Elliott Gould and Christina Pickles also appear as their recurring characters Jack and Judy Geller. Baxendale's role was originally intended to extend longer in the series, however due to her pregnancy she was written out by producers after deciding to leave the series to focus on her family.

== Reception ==
=== Ratings ===
In its original American broadcast, "The One After Ross Says Rachel" finished second in ratings for the week of September 21–27, 1998, according to Nielsen Media Research, with an overall 20.0 rating/33 share, equivalent to approximately 31.1 million viewing households. It was the second-highest rated show on the NBC network that week after ER. Although these figures represented a slight decrease on the two-part fourth-season finale which attracted 31.6 million viewers, it was an increase in viewership in comparison with the fourth-season premiere figures of 29.4 million viewers, and was the highest rated episode of the fifth season.

=== Reviews ===
Entertainment Weekly rated the episode "A" in its review of the fifth season, particularly praising the performance of David Schwimmer by highlighting how "The screwed-up nuptials give Schwimmer a chance to be at his puppy-dog-pathetic best". It also cited how Monica and Chandler's "hilariously horny adventures... add another layer of comic franticness" and Judy Geller's line of "This is worse than when he married the lesbian" in reference to the events of Ross' wedding is highlighted as the best of the episode. Colin Jacobson of DVD Movie Guide likened elements of the episode to a soap opera but that it still "proves amusing" as "It fails to bog down in those components and favors comedy instead." Schwimmer's "meltdown" performance is stated as being "always funny to watch" and "the constant problems suffered by Monica and Chandler add to the hijinks." Jacobson's overall impression of the episode was that it launched the season "on a positive note".
