= Cheryl Francis Harrington =

American actress

Cheryl Francis Harrington is an American actress. She is best known for playing Mambo Garcelle "Haiti Lady" DuPris on the television series The PJs. She also played a cameo role as Phoebe Buffay's interviewer in the American television sitcom Friends in the fourth episode of the fourth season "The One with the Ballroom Dancing".

== Credits ==
=== Film 1979 women at West Point Elizabeth ===
Year	Film	Role	Notes
1983	The Deluxe (USC short)	Lead	
1991	Perfume	Shelby	
1997	Legal Deceit		
1997	Friends	The Interviewer	"The One with the Ballroom Dancing"; TV
1999	Kartenspieler	Sheila	
2000	He's the One	Gladys Walker	
2000	The Stepdaughter	Mousy Inmate	
2002	Lucky	Electric Girl	
2005	Domino	Outraged Woman	
2006	Surf School	Mofika	
2007	The G! True Tinseltown Tale: Dude, Where's My Car?	Seann William Scott	
2007	Into the Wild	Social Worker	
2008	The Candy Shop	Mercedes	
2008	Surfer, Dude	Woman Customs Agent	
2009	The Perfect Host	Rental Car Receptionist	

=== Theatre (selected) ===
Year	Production	Role	Notes
1980	Eden	Annetta Barton	
2006	Ah-Ha Moments: Butterscotch & Fudge	Featured	NAACP Theatre Award for Best Supporting Female - Local
