= Absolutely Fabulous (2001 film) =

2001 film by Gabriel Aghion

- Theatrical release poster
- French: Absolument fabuleux
- Directed by: Gabriel Aghion
- Written by: Gabriel Aghion; François-Olivier Rousseau; Rémi Waterhouse; Pierre Palmade
- Based on: Absolutely Fabulous by: Jennifer Saunders; Dawn French
- Produced by: Pascal Houzelot
- Starring: Josiane Balasko; Nathalie Baye; Marie Gillain; Vincent Elbaz
- Cinematography: François Catonné
- Edited by: Maryline Monthieux
- Music by: Nicolas Neidhardt
- Production companies: Mosca Films; StudioCanal; TF1 Films Production; Sans Contrefaçon Productions; Josy Films; Sofica Sofinergie 5; Canal+
- Distributed by: BAC Films
- Release date: 29 August 2001 (France)
- Running time: 105 minutes
- Country: France
- Language: French
- Budget: $13.2 million
- Box office: $4.9 million

Absolutely Fabulous (French: Absolument fabuleux) is a 2001 French comedy film co-written and directed by Gabriel Aghion. It is an adaptation of the British television sitcom Absolutely Fabulous, created by Jennifer Saunders and Dawn French.

The film stars Josiane Balasko, Nathalie Baye, Marie Gillain and Claude Gensac. To parallel the role of Lulu in the original series, French singer Chantal Goya appeared as herself. Saunders makes a cameo appearance as a spectator sitting next to Catherine Deneuve at a fashion show.

== Cast ==
- Josiane Balasko as Edith "Eddie" Mousson
- Nathalie Baye as Patricia "Patsy" Laroche
- Marie Gillain as Safrane Vaudoye
- Vincent Elbaz as Jonathan
- Claude Gensac as Mamie Mousson
- Yves Rénier as Alain Vaudoye
- Saïd Taghmaoui as Manu
- Armelle as Cerise
- Tomer Sisley as Kevin

=== Cameo appearances ===
- Chantal Goya as herself
- Stéphane Bern as himself
- Christophe Robin as himself
- Jean-Paul Gaultier as himself
- Catherine Deneuve as herself
- Jennifer Saunders as herself
- Brigitte Fontaine as herself
- Estelle Lefébure as herself
- Claire Chazal as herself

== Production ==
Aghion's stated reason for making the film was to increase awareness of the series in France, where it was not widely known. For the screenplay, Aghion translated scenes from the original series, and tied them together into a coherent screenplay.

The role of Patsy was originally offered to Amanda Lear, who declined by saying that she had "already lived it".

== Reception ==
The film performed poorly at the French box office and was panned by most French critics, who argued that it failed to translate the typically British humour of the original television series.
