= Friends season 4 =

Season of television series

Friends
- Season 4
- Friends season 4 DVD cover
- Showrunners: David Crane; Marta Kauffman
- Starring: Jennifer Aniston; Courteney Cox; Lisa Kudrow; Matt LeBlanc; Matthew Perry; David Schwimmer
- No. of episodes: 24

Release
- Original network: NBC
- Original release: September 25, 1997 – May 7, 1998

Season chronology
- ← Previous; Season 3 Next → Season 5

The fourth season of the American television sitcom Friends aired on NBC from September 25, 1997 to May 7, 1998.

== Cast and characters ==
=== Main cast ===
- Jennifer Aniston as Rachel Green
- Courteney Cox as Monica Geller
- Lisa Kudrow as Phoebe Buffay
- Matt LeBlanc as Joey Tribbiani
- Matthew Perry as Chandler Bing
- David Schwimmer as Ross Geller

=== Recurring cast ===
- Helen Baxendale as Emily Waltham
- Tate Donovan as Joshua Burgin
- Giovanni Ribisi as Frank Buffay, Jr.
- Debra Jo Rupp as Alice Buffay
- Alison La Placa as Joanna
- Michael G. Hagerty as Mr. Treeger
- James Michael Tyler as Gunther
- Teri Garr as Phoebe Abbott
- Paxton Whitehead as Mr. Waltham
- Laura Dean as Sophie
- Paget Brewster as Kathy

=== Guest stars ===
- Maggie Wheeler as Janice Litman
- Elliott Gould as Jack Geller
- Christina Pickles as Judy Geller
- Jane Sibbett as Carol Willick Bunch
- Jessica Hecht as Susan Bunch
- Penn Jillette as Encyclopedia Salesman
- Dan Gauthier as Chip Matthews
- Rebecca Romijn as Cheryl
- Taylor Negron as Alessandro
- Sherri Shepherd as Rhonda, the tour guide
- Tom Conti as Steven Waltham
- Jennifer Saunders as Andrea Waltham
- June Whitfield as the housekeeper
- Olivia Williams as Felicity
- Jane Carr as the ticket agent
- Hugh Laurie as The Gentleman on the Plane
- Richard Branson as souvenir seller
- Anne Betancourt as The Saleslady
- Christina Moore as Marjorie
- Thea Mann as Sleep Clinic Worker
- Sarah Ferguson as Herself

== Episodes ==
No. overall	No. in season	Title	Directed by	Written by	Original release date	Prod. code	U.S. viewers (millions)	Rating/share (18–49)
74	1	"The One with the Jellyfish"	Shelley Jensen	Wil Calhoun	September 25, 1997	466601	29.43	15.5/44
Ross breaks up with Bonnie in order to get back with Rachel, who prompts him to first read her 18-page letter discussing their relationship and previous break-up. Ross falls asleep while reading the letter, and unwittingly agrees to take full responsibility for their break-up later on. Ross and Rachel then break up again after he refuses to take all the blame for their previous problems (as have been stated in the letter) and insists they were "on a break". Joey and Chandler come to Monica's rescue after she is stung by a jellyfish - one of them has to pee on her leg to relieve the pain, as suggested by Joey who has learnt it from watching the Discovery Channel. Phoebe goes to see her sister, Ursula, who reveals that she already knows the truth about their birth mother.
75	2	"The One with the Cat"	Shelley Jensen	Jill Condon & Amy Toomin	October 2, 1997	466602	25.54	13.3/40
Monica runs into Chip Matthews, Rachel's high school prom date, and is thrilled when he asks her out, though it causes tensions between her and Rachel (and ultimately Ross). Monica quickly realizes Chip never matured beyond high school and dumps him. Chandler forces Joey to sell the entertainment unit that Joey built after Chandler keeps ripping his work suit on it. A prospective buyer traps Joey inside the unit, then steals most of the guys' furniture. Phoebe is overjoyed to find a cat that she believes contains her adoptive mother’s (Lily’s) spirit.
76	3	"The One with the Cuffs"	Peter Bonerz	Seth Kurland	October 9, 1997	466603	23.98	12.4/37
Joey is enticed when a door-to-door encyclopedia salesman shows up at his apartment, since he has always felt left out whenever the gang has intellectual conversations. However, Joey can only afford to buy the sample volume and becomes knowledgeable only on subjects that start with the letter "V." Monica caters a party for her mother, but the mini-quiches are effectively ruined when one of her false fingernails gets lost in one. Judy then reveals that she expected Monica to mess up so she bought frozen lasagnas as back-up. Monica, upset that her mother has never had faith in her, whips up delicious dishes at the last minute to prove her mother wrong. Judy ultimately gets impressed and the two reconcile. Meanwhile, Chandler begins dating Rachel's boss, Joanna, again but lands in a sticky situation when Joanna handcuffs him inside her office, then leaves for a meeting that gets delayed, stranding him for hours. Rachel is furious when she sneaks into Joanna’s office (having been under the impression that Joanna has been listing names of employees that would get a Christmas bonus) to find Chandler stuck there pantsless, since he has promised to end the relationship many times but never does.
77	4	"The One with the Ballroom Dancing"	Gail Mancuso	Ted Cohen & Andrew Reich	October 16, 1997	466604	24.31	12.6/37
Phoebe struggles to remain professional with an attractive client. When she finally confesses her feelings to him, he reciprocates and the two start making out. Phoebe’s boss then walks in on them, informs her the man is married, and then fires her for “being a whore”. Chandler hits a snag whenever he tries to revoke his gym membership due to pressure from the assertive staff, so he enlists Ross's help. However, he still fails to quit and Ross ends up joining the gym. Both men are then revealed to have serious problems in being assertive whenever an attractive lady is involved. Joey confronts Mr. Treeger after he makes Rachel cry. Mr. Treeger responds by threatening to report Monica for illegally subletting her grandmother's apartment. In order to save the girls from eviction, Joey reluctantly agrees to help Mr. Treeger practice ballroom dancing in order to help the latter impress his crush at an upcoming social event.
78	5	"The One with Joey's New Girlfriend"	Gail Mancuso	Gregory S. Malins & Michael Curtis	October 30, 1997	466605	24.35	12.7/35
Phoebe has a cold that she thinks improves her singing voice, only to be frustrated when her "sexy phlegm" disappears. She then desperately tries to catch a cold again from multiple sources, including Monica and Gunther, in order to get her “sexy” voice back. Ross attempts to make Rachel jealous by dating Amanda, a beautiful woman with a child Ben's age, only to discover that she just acknowledges him as a babysitter to her child. As payback, Rachel also starts dating a cute college guy, Josh, who turns out to be immature and constantly stealing from her and the gang. Meanwhile, Chandler falls in love with Joey's new actress girlfriend, Kathy, much to the former’s dismay.
79	6	"The One with the Dirty Girl"	Shelley Jensen	Shana Goldberg-Meehan & Scott Silveri	November 6, 1997	466606	25.68	13.5/38
Phoebe helps Monica cater a funeral, but the merry widow intimidates Monica to avoid paying. Phoebe then takes charge and demands the widow to settle the bill. Both girls ultimately decide to start their own catering business. Chandler reluctantly helps Joey find Kathy a birthday present better than the one he bought for her (a limited edition book from Kathy’s childhood), ultimately sacrificing his gift to substitute for Joey's tacky one (a dual-functioning pen). Ross, revolted by his beautiful new girlfriend's filthy apartment, finally calls it quits. Rachel is determined to complete a crossword without help. Kathy later thanks Chandler for the book, realising that he bought it instead of Joey.
80	7	"The One Where Chandler Crosses the Line"	Kevin S. Bright	Adam Chase	November 13, 1997	466607	26.35	13.9/38
Ross starts playing the keyboards again after much prompting from Phoebe. His musical compositions leave the gang aghast, except for Phoebe who thinks they are brilliant. Chandler's feelings towards Kathy reach a breaking point after they kiss. Guilt-ridden, he eventually tells Joey the truth and then vainly tries to fix things but to no avail. Joey is outraged by Chandler’s betrayal even though he is dating another woman at the same time.
81	8	"The One with Chandler in a Box"	Peter Bonerz	Michael Borkow	November 20, 1997	466608	26.76	13.7/39
During Thanksgiving dinner, Joey punishes Chandler for kissing Kathy by sentencing him to a “time out" inside a crate, for the same duration as when Joey was stuck in the entertainment unit in an earlier episode. Joey finally relents when he witnesses Kathy breaking up with Chandler, who is still inside the crate and resists responding in spite of the situation. Joey ultimately gives Chandler and Kathy his approval and prompts the former to chase after the latter. Ross is shocked to learn that Rachel exchanges every gift she is given, but she shows Ross that she keeps things that matter. Monica becomes infatuated with Richard’s son, Timothy, who is also an eye doctor, when she has an appointment with him after accidentally getting some ice into her eye. Monica and Timothy later kiss, though the former reveals that the kiss reminds her of Richard and both get disgusted soon afterwards.
82	9	"The One Where They're Going to Party!"	Peter Bonerz	Ted Cohen & Andrew Reich	December 11, 1997	466609	23.89	N/A
Monica and Phoebe buy a tacky van for their new catering business, but plans are upended when Monica is offered the head chef job at “Alessandro's”, a restaurant she recently trashed in a review for a neighborhood paper. Rachel applies for an assistant buyer job in another Bloomingdale's department, only to be sabotaged during the interview by her boss, Joanna, who wants to keep Rachel as her assistant. Rachel confronts Joanna, who then offers to make her an assistant buyer in her department. Unfortunately, Joanna meets an untimely end before Rachel's promotion takes effect. Ross and Chandler are excited when their friend Mike 'Gandalf' Ganderson is coming to town to party all night. When Gandalf cancels at the last minute, Joey says they can still have a great time, though the guys get beaten down before the night ends.
83	10	"The One with the Girl from Poughkeepsie"	Gary Halvorson	Scott Silveri	December 18, 1997	466612	23.22	N/A
Chandler's attempt to set Rachel up with someone from work gets out of hand when his colleagues start competing with one another, believing she only wants a fling. He then scares everyone off by saying Rachel wants a serious relationship. Monica's new staff at Alessandro's resent her for replacing their family member as the head chef, and constantly bully her at work. Upon heeding Chandler’s advice, Monica hires Joey just so she can fake fire him in order to show her staff who is boss. When Joey gets lucrative tips from working at the restaurant, he refuses to give Monica a reason to fire him. However, when Joey truly sees the degree of cruelty and abuse Monica is being forced to endure, which almost makes her resign, he sticks to his part and Monica fires him in front of everyone. This is enough for Monica to acquire control over her colleagues who realize they could get fired too. Ross is torn between a pretty but overly-serious girl who lives nearby and a fun one who lives upstate, which requires him to commute long hours to meet. Phoebe writes a holiday song for her friends but has trouble rhyming their names with holiday-themed things.
84	11	"The One with Phoebe's Uterus"	David Steinberg	Seth Kurland	January 8, 1998	466610	23.66	N/A
Chandler has not had sex with his girlfriend, Kathy, ever since they got together due to the former’s fear of not being able to “fill Joey’s shoes”. Monica and Rachel then offer Chandler some advice on improving his bedroom performance, leading to Kathy expressing her endless gratitude to Monica. Ross lands Joey a job as a tour guide at the museum, which ultimately results in the latter’s disappointment when he witnesses an existential class divide within the museum. His friendship with Ross becomes strained when the latter is not willing to sit with him in the lunch room due to their designation differences. Guilt-ridden by the lunch incident, Ross decides to make amends to Joey by rectifying the class divide in the museum the next day. Phoebe's brother, Frank Jr., and Alice have eloped and tried to conceive naturally many times, without any success. The couple then asks Phoebe to carry their baby. Phoebe’s birth mum decides to give her puppy to Phoebe for a few days to help the latter make her decision. Phoebe eventually decides to fulfil Frank Jr.’s and Alice’s wishes.
85	12	"The One with the Embryos"	Kevin S. Bright	Jill Condon & Amy Toomin	January 15, 1998	466611	27.14	N/A
Rachel and Monica demand that Chandler and Joey get rid of their pet birds when the rooster starts to crow incessantly every morning before sunrise. The four of them also have an argument about who knows whom better, which results in Ross designing a trivia quiz with high stakes: if the men lose, they give up their pets, but if the women lose, they switch apartments with the men. The result comes down to a tie breaker, which the girls lose, thereby forcing them to move. Meanwhile, the embryos from Frank Jr. and Alice have been successfully implanted into Phoebe's uterus, leading to a tense wait that ultimately results in Phoebe’s pregnancy albeit much pressure from knowing that the chance of pregnancy is quite slim, and the couple has invested all their life savings for the IVF. In 2009, TV Guide ranked this episode number 21 on its list of the 100 Greatest Episodes.
86	13	"The One with Rachel's Crush"	Dana DeVally Piazza	Shana Goldberg-Meehan	January 29, 1998	466613	25.27	13.0/36
Monica is determined to continue being 'the hostess' and strives to succeed despite having switched apartments with Chandler and Joey. Chandler is worried when Kathy and a fellow actor, Nick, get steamy on stage in a play, which leads to him unfairly accusing Kathy of cheating on him. When he later goes to her apartment to apologize, he discovers that Kathy has started sleeping with Nick, even though the latter two did not when Chandler confronted Kathy about her possible infidelity. Rachel is disgruntled after Bloomingdale’s eliminates her department and “demotes” her to be a personal shopper in another department. However, her job attitude improves when she meets a handsome customer named Joshua. Having had no experience in asking a guy out, Rachel seeks advice from Joey and Phoebe, though her plan in asking Joshua out ultimately backfires on her when, according to her, she is not in the date that she has successfully asked for.
87	14	"The One with Joey's Dirty Day"	Peter Bonerz	Wil Calhoun	February 5, 1998	466614	25.08	14.5/37
Chandler is depressed over his break-up with Kathy, leading to the girls intervening to help him get over the latter. One of the plans involves bringing Chandler to a strip club. However, the plan backfires when the girls inadvertently sideline him. With no other options, Rachel asks for Ross's help after she accidentally becomes double-booked with Joshua and her boss, with the former inviting her to an inaugural club opening and the latter wanting her to accompany his niece, Emily, to an opera concert. Much to Ross’s chagrin, he agrees to meet Emily and take her to the opera concert. In the end, Ross and Emily hit it off and ultimately end up spending the weekend together at a bed and breakfast in Vermont, whereas Rachel is unable to enter the club that she has been invited to due to a mix-up and ends up not meeting Joshua at all. Meanwhile, Joey arrives home with an unpleasant odor following a three-day fishing trip with his father. He oversleeps and rushes to a movie set without showering. He later sneaks into Charlton Heston's dressing room to take a shower and gets caught doing so by the latter. Note: This is Helen Baxendale's first appearance as Emily.
88	15	"The One with All the Rugby"	James Burrows	Story by : Ted Cohen & Andrew Reich; Teleplay by : Wil Calhoun	February 26, 1998	466617	24.44	12.8/35
Ross risks life and limb in his desperate attempt to prove to Emily how tough he is by playing an aggressive game of rugby with her athletic British friends. Monica becomes obsessed with a wall switch in her current (previously Chandler’s and Joey’s) apartment which appears to have no function. She resorts to every possible measure in trying to determine the switch’s origin, but to no avail, so she eventually gives up. Unbeknownst to her, the switch actually controls the television in her previous (now Chandler’s and Joey’s) apartment. Chandler runs into Janice during a manicure session with Rachel and goes to extreme measures to avoid her, which include telling her that he is being transferred to Yemen for work.
89	16	"The One with the Fake Party"	Michael Lembeck	Story by : Alicia Sky Varinaitis; Teleplay by : Scott Silveri & Shana Goldberg-Meehan	March 19, 1998	466615	23.13	11.7/33
Phoebe’s pregnancy causes her to crave meat despite being a devout vegetarian. She seeks Joey for advice and he decides to sacrifice his meat consumption in order to balance out the amount of meat that Phoebe eats. Meanwhile, Ross wants to spend as much time with Emily as possible before she returns to London. However, Rachel throws a fake surprise goodbye party for Emily as a ruse to invite Joshua, thereby disrupting Ross's more intimate farewell plans.
90	17	"The One with the Free Porn"	Michael Lembeck	Story by : Mark Kunerth; Teleplay by : Richard Goodman	March 26, 1998	466616	23.22	12.1/36
Phoebe is shocked when she learns that she is expecting triplets and wants to find ways to help financially support her brother and sister-in-law. She ultimately decides to start a massage/taxi business with Frank Jr. using the van that she and Monica were once going to use for a catering business. Monica persuades Ross to pursue Emily to the airport. Ross arrives just as Emily is boarding and says that he loves her. However, she merely thanks him and leaves. She later calls him to apologise for her lukewarm reaction and says it was because there is someone else. Monica believes that Emily reciprocates Ross’s love and convinces him to go to London to profess his love again. Ross flies off, unaware that Emily has returned to New York to declare her love for him. The couple finally connect by phone. Chandler and Joey are delighted to discover a free pornography channel on their TV and become addicted when they refuse to turn it off.
91	18	"The One with Rachel's New Dress"	Gail Mancuso	Story by : Andrew Reich & Ted Cohen; Teleplay by : Jill Condon & Amy Toomin	April 2, 1998	466620	21.72	11.5/33
Frank Jr. and Alice ask Phoebe to name one of their unborn triplets, which leads to Joey and Chandler competing to get her to choose their names. In the process, Joey argues that "Chandler" is a sissy name, prompting Chandler to consider changing his full name, though he has ulterior motives. Ross becomes paranoid when Emily and Carol's wife, Susan, spend time together in London, fearing that Susan would once again steal someone he loves. Rachel wears a revealing dress and an even sexier slip under it while dining with Joshua at his apartment, in hope of finally sleeping with him. However, her plans go awry when Joshua’s parents unexpectedly show up at the apartment.
92	19	"The One with All the Haste"	Kevin S. Bright	Scott Silveri & Wil Calhoun	April 9, 1998	466618	21.76	11.4/36
Monica and Rachel resort to desperate measures in order to win their apartment back from Joey and Chandler. These include bribing the guys with Knicks tickets and challenging them to another game. The girls lose the tickets and the game, but eventually switch apartments while Joey and Chandler are at the Knicks game. Monica and Rachel also kiss for a full minute (offscreen) to prevent Joey and Chandler from complaining. Meanwhile, Ross is disheartened with Emily returning to London again, so they spontaneously decide to get married.
93	20	"The One with All the Wedding Dresses"	Gail Mancuso	Story by : Adam Chase; Teleplay by : Gregory S. Malins & Michael Curtis	April 16, 1998	466621	21.94	11.6/35
Chandler, frustrated by Joey's loud snoring, takes him to a sleep clinic, where he meets an attractive woman with her own sleeping issues. Monica and Phoebe pick up Emily's wedding gown at the bridal shop. Monica tries it on and refuses to take it off. She even resorts to wearing the gown at home while doing chores. Phoebe then shows up in a rented wedding dress, and both girls pathetically role-play as brides throughout the day. Rachel, struggling to accept Ross’s and Emily's engagement, shocks Joshua by suggesting they should get married. Rachel then leaves Joshua a voice message explaining she was just upset about the engagement; she never expects to see him again. Monica and Phoebe try cheering Rachel up by getting her to wear her old wedding dress, only for Joshua to unexpectedly show up. Seeing her in a bridal gown, he tacitly breaks up with her by running off for good.
94	21	"The One with the Invitation"	Peter Bonerz	Seth Kurland	April 23, 1998	466619	21.51	11.3/37
A pregnant Phoebe is frustrated that she is unable to attend Ross's and Emily’s wedding in London. Meanwhile, Ross surprises Emily by inviting Rachel, causing him to reminisce about their time together. Rachel ponders the invitation while also reminiscing about her relationship with Ross. She concludes it will be too heartbreaking to attend the wedding and ultimately decides to stay with Phoebe in New York.: This episode acts as a clip show which includes much footage of Ross’s and Rachel's relationship up to this episode.
95	22	"The One with the Worst Best Man Ever"	Peter Bonerz	Story by : Seth Kurland; Teleplay by : Gregory S. Malins & Michael Curtis	April 30, 1998	466622	23.15	11.9/38
Rachel and Monica throw a baby shower for Phoebe, who is experiencing extreme mood swings and growing depressed about having to give up the babies after they are born. Meanwhile, Ross chooses Joey over Chandler to be his best man, but Joey accidentally loses the wedding ring after throwing a bachelor party for Ross, which features a stripper. The men then discover that the duck swallowed the ring, and take it to the vet. The ring is successfully retrieved, and Ross ultimately decides to make both Chandler and Joey his best men.
96	23	"The One with Ross' Wedding"	Kevin S. Bright	Michael Borkow	May 7, 1998 (Note: These episodes originally aired as a single double-length episode but are sometimes split into two episodes for syndication, reruns and DVD presentation.)	466623	31.61	16.7/49
97	24	"The One with Ross' Wedding"	Kevin S. Bright	Story by : Jill Condon & Amy Toomin; Teleplay by : Shana Goldberg-Meehan & Scott Silveri	May 7, 1998	466624	31.61	16.7/49
Everyone except Rachel and Phoebe fly to London for Ross’s and Emily's wedding. Joey embarrasses Chandler while sightseeing in London. Ross and Emily are shocked that their wedding venue is undergoing an early demolition. Monica suggests postponing the wedding, infuriating Ross. Back in New York, Phoebe sheds light on Rachel about the latter still loving Ross, prompting Rachel to head to London and stop the wedding by confessing to Ross. Later, Ross and Monica surprise Emily by transforming the partially-demolished church into a suitable venue. Joey becomes homesick but a bridesmaid cheers him up. Phoebe repeatedly calls London to get the gang to stop Rachel. After seeing Ross and Emily together, Rachel is unable to tell Ross the truth. Monica and Chandler sleep together, hiding it from the others. At the altar, Ross says Rachel's name instead of Emily's.

== Home media ==
The fourth season was officially released on DVD in region 1 on July 15, 2003 by Warner Home Video, as a 4-disc DVD Box Set. The release includes the extended versions of every episode with footage not seen on their original NBC broadcast. Special Features include 3 audio commentaries with executive producers Kevin S. Bright, Marta Kaufmann and David Crane, a video guide to season four's guest stars, a full-length documentary exploring the Friends phenomenon in other countries, a trivia quiz and video character bios. For region 2, the release included the original NBC broadcast version of the episodes, and not the extended versions unlike the region 1 release.

Season 4 was released on Blu-ray altogether with the rest of the series on the Complete Series releases; in this releases the episodes are presented in their original NBC broadcast versions and does not include the extra deleted scenes and jokes that were included in the DVD version. Additional audio and subtitle tracks are also included with this releases.

Friends: The Complete Fourth Season
Set Details		Special Features
23 episodes (1 double-length episode); 4-disc set (DVD); 2 discs (Blu-ray); English (Dolby 5.0 Surround) (DVD); English (Dolby Digital 5.1) (Blu-ray); English, French, Spanish, Chinese & Korean subtitles; Audio Commentaries; 561 minutes (DVD); 535 minutes (Blu-ray)		Over 30 minutes of Never-Before-Seen footage included on every episode (DVD Only); Producers Commentary on 3 episodes: "The One with Chandler in a Box", "The One with the Embryos" and "The One with Ross's Wedding"; Friends Around the World: An All-New Documentary; Friends of Friends: Video Guestbook; What's Up with Your Friends: Video Character Bios (Note: Not available on the 2019 re-release of the DVD's); Who Knows Whom Best?: Trivia Quiz (DVD Only) (Note: Not available on the 2019 re-release of the DVD's)
Release Dates
Region 1	Region 2	Region 4
July 15, 2003	May 29, 2000	October 4, 2006

== Reception ==
Collider ranked the season Number 8 on their ranking of all ten Friends seasons, and named "The One with the Embryos" as its standout episode.
