= The One with Ross's Wedding =

- Friends episodes
- Episode nos.: Season 4 Episodes 23/24
- Directed by: Kevin S. Bright
- Story by: Michael Borkow (part 1); Jill Condon & Amy Toomin (part 2)
- Teleplay by: Michael Borkow (part 1); Shana Goldberg-Meehan & Scott Silveri (part 2)
- Production codes: 466623 (part 1); 466624 (part 2)
- Original air date: May 7, 1998

Guest appearances
- Helen Baxendale as Emily Waltham; Sarah, Duchess of York as herself; Richard Branson as Vendor; Tom Conti as Stephen Waltham; Jennifer Saunders as Andrea Waltham; Elliott Gould as Jack Geller; Christina Pickles as Judy Geller; Hugh Laurie as Gentleman on the Plane; June Whitfield as Housekeeper; Olivia Williams as Felicity

Episode chronology
← Previous "The One with the Worst Best Man Ever"	Next → "The One After Ross Says Rachel"
- Friends season 4

"The One with Ross's Wedding" is the two-part fourth-season finale of the American television sitcom Friends, comprising the 96th and 97th episodes of the series overall. Originally broadcast by NBC on May 7, 1998, the episode features Ross, Monica, Joey, Chandler and later Rachel travelling to England to attend the wedding of Ross Geller (David Schwimmer) to his fiancée Emily (Helen Baxendale) in London. Ross and Emily's wedding vows are ruined when Ross accidentally says "I, Ross, take thee Rachel"; as the registrar asks Emily if he should continue, the episode ends on a cliffhanger until the season 5 premiere "The One After Ross Says Rachel". The episode also introduces Chandler and Monica's romantic relationship after they impulsively have a one-night stand. Lisa Kudrow won an Emmy Award for her work in the episode.

The episode's teleplay was written by Shana Goldberg-Meehan & Scott Silveri from a story by Michael Borkow (part one) and Jill Condon & Amy Toomin (part two). The episode's genesis came during the break between seasons three and four, when Channel 4, the British first-run broadcaster of Friends proposed an episode set in the United Kingdom to the series producers. The proposal fitted neatly with a storyline already being planned, whereby the character of Ross would be married at the end of the fourth season. The episode was filmed in March 1998 under the direction of executive producer Kevin S. Bright on locations in London, and in front of a live studio audience at The Fountain Studios. Scenes featuring Lisa Kudrow's character Phoebe Buffay were filmed on the show's sets in Burbank, California, as the pregnant Kudrow (and consequently her character) was unable to fly to London with the rest of the cast. Kudrow gave birth to her son on the day of the episode's original airing.

"The One with Ross's Wedding" features supporting roles from Tom Conti, Jennifer Saunders, Elliott Gould, Christina Pickles and Olivia Williams, and cameos by Richard Branson, Sarah, Duchess of York, Hugh Laurie and June Whitfield. The episode received good critical feedback in the U.S. on its first broadcast, and is often cited as one of the series' best episodes; however, when it aired in the United Kingdom it was poorly received, with criticism focused on the one-dimensional portrayal of Britain and the British.

== Plot ==
=== Part 1 ===
The group heads off to Ross's wedding in London, leaving behind a heavily pregnant Phoebe (Lisa Kudrow), and Rachel (Jennifer Aniston), who has declined the invitation because it would be too hard for her to see her ex-boyfriend get married.

In London, Joey (Matt LeBlanc) and Chandler (Matthew Perry) go see the sights in a musical montage, with Joey filming everything on his camcorder. Chandler becomes embarrassed by his friend's enthusiasm, and after Joey buys a large Union Flag hat from a vendor (Richard Branson), they part company. They reunite in their hotel room and Chandler apologizes. Joey impresses him with a video recording with Sarah, Duchess of York, but quickly becomes homesick after a phone call from Phoebe.

Emily takes Monica (Courteney Cox) and Ross to the church where the wedding will be, but they discover it is being demolished earlier than originally scheduled. Monica later suggests Emily postpone the wedding until everything is perfect. Emily passes the thought on to Ross, which angers and frustrates him. Ross tells Emily that it is "now or never"; she chooses "never". Monica berates Ross for his insensitivity and Ross apologizes to Emily, showing her the ceremony can still take place in the half-demolished hall that he has tidied up. She agrees.

In New York, Rachel realizes she still loves Ross, and is further taken aback that the entire group apart from Ross knew about it. Phoebe tries to help Rachel get over her feelings for Ross, but to no avail. Rachel soon decides to fly to London to tell him she loves him, ignoring Phoebe's protests.

=== Part 2 ===
At the rehearsal dinner, Ross introduces his parents, Jack and Judy (Elliott Gould and Christina Pickles) to Emily's, Steven and Andrea (Tom Conti and Jennifer Saunders). Jack and Judy have volunteered to pay for half of the wedding expenses but, when they discover extravagant costs, Ross spends much of the evening trying to bargain down his future in-laws. Chandler makes a toast that is not well received by the guests and Monica is taken aback when a drunken guest mistakes her for Ross's mother. She and Chandler console each other over alcohol and wake up in bed together the next morning.

On the flight from New York to London, Rachel annoys other passengers by telling them about her relationship with Ross. Eventually, one of the passengers (Hugh Laurie) calls her out on her selfishness, pointing out that while Rachel claims to love Ross, she is going to ruin the happiest day of his life, and she should accept how things are. He also says that she and Ross were definitely "on a break". Phoebe tries to contact someone by phone to warn them about Rachel, eventually getting through to Joey at the hotel on the morning of the wedding. Joey devises a plan with Monica and Chandler for the three of them to intercept Rachel, but he does not see Rachel arrive in the hall, as he is distracted by kissing a bridesmaid who had seduced him the night before. Rachel sees Ross and Emily kiss after he has urged their parents to stop their argument over the wedding. She realizes how happy Ross is with Emily and congratulates him.

Phoebe phones Joey to hear the wedding and is relieved that Rachel has come to her senses. As Ross says his vows, he accidentally says Rachel's name in place of Emily's. The wedding party stands in shocked silence as the registrar asks Emily if he should continue.

== Production ==
During the summer hiatus of 1997, the producers were contacted by Channel 4, the British first-run broadcaster of Friends, with a proposal to film an episode in London. Producer Greg Malins is quoted as saying "We had to come up with a storyline that would cause all the Friends to go to London [...] and that ended up being Ross getting married, because they would all have to go to his wedding". Casting Director Leslie Litt said Musician Paul McCartney was approached to play Emily's dad, but he declined as he was busy at the time.

The episode featured numerous supporting roles from British actors. For her role as Andrea Waltham, Saunders "heard Joan Collins' voice in [her] head". Her Absolutely Fabulous co-star June Whitfield appeared in cameo as the housekeeper. Felicity, the bridesmaid who Joey entices, is played by Olivia Williams. Further cameos were made by Sarah, Duchess of York as herself, Richard Branson as the vendor who sells Joey a hat, and Hugh Laurie as the man sitting next to Rachel on the plane. Lisa Kudrow did not join the others in London as she was too heavily pregnant to fly, as was her character Phoebe. Elliott Gould inadvertently revealed to the public that Rachel was to turn up at the wedding, upsetting Marta Kauffman.

Scenes not involving the main apartments were all filmed in London during the week beginning March 30, 1998. Location shooting was done mostly for scenes featuring Joey and Chandler; outside the London Marriott, Grosvenor Square, the top of an open-top London bus as it crosses Tower Bridge (this scene was excised from the final cut but features in the opening titles of the next episode), and near St John's Church, Wapping. Interiors, such as the restaurant, the Walthams' hallway and the hotel rooms, were all filmed on purpose-built sets at The Fountain Studios, Wembley. The reaction from the audience when Monica came out from under Chandler's bed covers meant the actors had to hold their position for 27 seconds. When filming ran late one evening, the production team ordered pizzas for the audience.

The episode was a coup for Channel 4, who erected crush barriers outside their building to hold back fans when the cast arrived for a press conference (though no fans actually turned up). The broadcaster also commissioned a behind-the-scenes program from Princess Productions. Hosted by British television personality Johnny Vaughan, The One Where Johnny Makes Friends features comedic tongue-in-cheek interviews with all six main cast (Vaughan contacted Kudrow by payphone, claiming that he could not make international calls from his dressing room) and was broadcast on Channel 4 on May 6, 1998.

Two brief behind-the-scenes featurettes were filmed, titled Friends Goes to London and Friends on Location in London, which were included on the DVD releases of seasons four and five. A tie-in book, Making Friends in the UK (ISBN 0752221949) was published by Channel 4 Books in November 1998. It was bundled into a gift pack entitled "The One with the Whole London Wedding", which featured an extended cut of the episode merged with the next episode.

Ross and Emily's marriage was originally planned to last, but Helen Baxendale did not wish to remain in America while pregnant. The writers could not script a convincing story for why Emily would not be seen, despite being married to Ross, so Baxendale was written out in the next season, making only three cameo appearances after the season premiere.

Scripts for the two episodes were recovered from a bin by a Fountain Studios member of staff following taping, and it was reported in 2024 that they were sold for auction in Hertfordshire, England for £22,000 (approximately $28,100).

== Reception ==
In its original airing, "The One with Ross's Wedding" finished third in ratings for the week of May 4–10, 1998, with a Nielsen rating of 21.2, equivalent to approximately 20.6 million viewing households. It was the third highest-rated show on NBC that week, following Seinfeld and ER – all of which aired on the network's Thursday night Must See TV lineup. The episode aired in the Republic of Ireland on RTÉ on May 25, 1998, six days earlier than in the United Kingdom on Sky1. It also aired on Channel 4 on December 11, 1998, and was watched by 6.49 million viewers, making Friends the highest rated show on the channel for the week ending December 13, 1998.

Entertainment Weekly gives the episode an A rating, calling it a "near-perfect finale that finds everyone at the top of their game" with a "tantalizing cliff-hanger, and, in Chandler and Monica, a relationship that will have reverberations for seasons to come". The authors of Friends Like Us: The Unofficial Guide to Friends state there are "too many 'best moments' to list in detail", but single out Monica describing the perfect wedding to Ross, and Sarah Ferguson's cameo (though they call Branson's "embarrassing"). Following the broadcast of the episode in the UK, The Independent was critical, saying "Twice the length of a normal episode, last night's offering was approximately half as funny" and suggested the cast were behaving out of character.

David Schwimmer has expressed dissatisfaction that Ross was married again, saying it was "a mistake" and that Ross was not given "enough credit". He says that Ross's "taking on the world would just be shattered" and that he would not have risked marrying again. David Crane has said that filming in front of a different audience "energized the actors and writers". The hall where the wedding ceremony took place would inspire the location for the wedding of David and Victoria Beckham. The events of this episode are revisited in the seventh-season episode "The One with the Truth About London", in which flashbacks reveal how Monica and Chandler ended up in bed together. The hotel room set was recreated for those scenes.

In 2013, TV Guide ranked the beginning of the Monica-Chandler affair as the third-greatest twist of all time.

=== Accolades ===
At the 50th Primetime Emmy Awards, Lisa Kudrow won Outstanding Supporting Actress in a Comedy Series for her work in the episode.
