= Joel Silverman =

American dog trainer

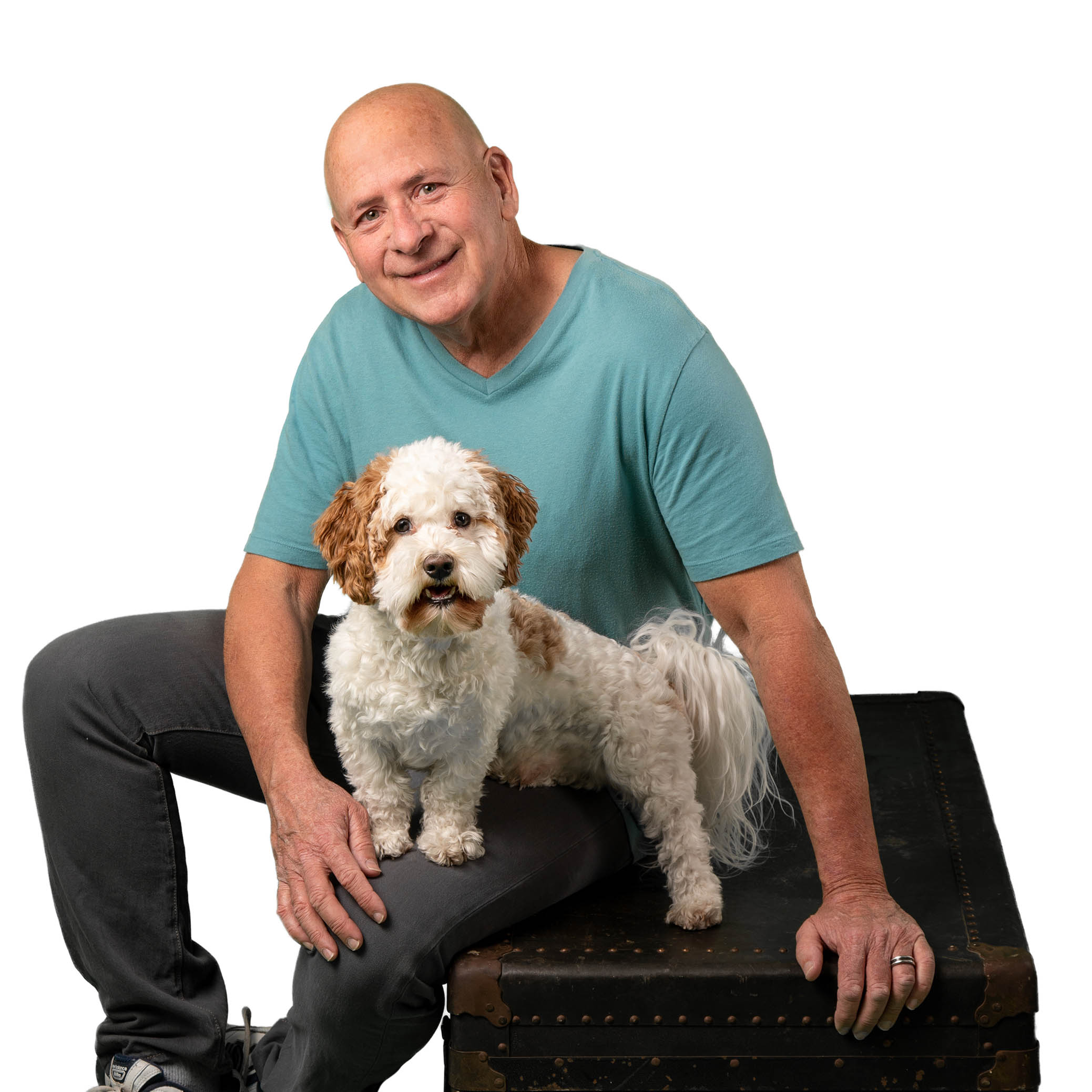
- Joel Silverman and Oliver
- Born: December 21, 1958 (Age 65)
- Birthplace: Hollywood, CA.
- Occupation: Celebrity Dog Trainer
- Residence: Fort Myers, Florida
- Spouse: Michelle Silverman (m.2014)

Joel Silverman (born December 21, 1958) is a celebrity animal trainer who hosted Good Dog U on Animal Planet from 1999–2009.

== Early life ==
Joel Silverman grew up in Southern California and at the age of 13, the first animal he ever trained was the family dog, Shadow. At about the same time, he and his family spent their summer vacations in San Diego and would go to SeaWorld every year, and after a number of summers watching the trainers riding the orcas, Silverman developed a fascination with the whales and trainers. At the age of 16, he got hired to pick up trash at SeaWorld, and after helping out the trainers and years of hard work, Silverman was hired as a trainer. He started off with Pacific and Atlantic bottle-nosed dolphins, California sea lions, and eventually orcas.

- In 1983 Silverman shifted his focus into training animals for movies TV shows and commercials, and currently training animals for film and TV.
- From 1988 to 1992 Joel was the trainer of Dreyfuss from the TV series Empty Nest.
- In 1989, Joel wrote and hosted his first dog training video called, Joel Silverman's Hollywood Dog Training Program. It was sold as an infomercial and had sold over 300,000 videos at that time.
- In 1999, Joel hosted his first TV series called, "GOOD DOG U" which aired on Animal Planet from 1999–2009.

== Dog Training Style ==
Although there are a variety of styles and methods to train dogs, Joel Silverman's style is what he calls a "hybrid" dog training method. This method combines parts of dog training he learned from training dolphins, sea lions, and orcas, as well as the training of dogs. Joel also adds a personality based dog training style called What Color is Your Dog? This method teaches people that there is no "one size fits all" approach to dog training. He believes dogs should be trained based solely on their personalities.

== Partial TV & Film Credits ==
- 1988-1992 - Empty Nest - Dog Trainer
- 1997-2014 - IAMS National print and commercials - Dog & Cat Trainer/Animal coordinator
- 2005 - A Good Year - Dog Trainer
- Full List - IMDb

== Videos ==
- 1989 - The Hollywood Dog Training Program
- 1999 - "Unleashed" - A series of videos for the Petco pet store chain
- 2009–Present - Joel Silverman's Dog Training DVD Series

== Authored Books ==
- (2009) - Explains how to train a dog based on the dog's personality.
- Take 2 - Training Solutions to Rescued Dogs (2010) - Explains how to find the right dog to adopt, as well helps the reader with problem solving issues.
- Bond with Your Heart, Train with Your Brain (2012) - A self-help book for parents, teachers, managers, and supervisors for building a better relationship.. all animal based.
- More What Color is Your Dog? (2015) - Follow up book to Joel's first book What Color is Your Dog? Explains how to train a dog based on the dog's personality.
- Rituals (2019) - In this book, Silverman talks about patterns that dogs can develop, and sometimes it is a good thing, and at times it can be a bad thing.

== Playing Self in Commercials ==
In October 2014, Chase bank was looking for people that they thought had mastered their careers, and contacted Joel Silverman and asked him to be involved with their new Chase Mastery Campaign. This campaign involved Joel Silverman. Serena Williams, Tim Morehouse, and The Rockettes. Joel's pictures were in most of the Chase banks for a good portion of 2015, and Joel's dog Duchess starred with him in the commercial and was seen in the banks, taking the receipt, and holding it in her mouth. From August 2015 to April 2016, this commercial aired nearly 4,000 times nationally. https://www.ispot.tv/ad/7U7g/jpmorgan-chase-chase-mastery-dog-trainer-feat-joel-silverman

== Joel Silverman's Dog Trainer Certification Course ==
In January, 2017, Joel Silverman launched his "hands on" Dog Trainer Certification Course. This course is for individuals looking for a career in dog training. Silverman selects four to five dogs from a local humane society somewhere in the U.S., and over a five-day period, the students train the dogs to sit, stay, come, heel, lie down, and "go to a place".

== Television series ==
- Hosted Good Dog U on Animal Planet - 1999 to 2010
- Hosted, wrote and directed What Color is Your Dog? 2011–Present

== Awards ==
- 2008 "Dog Trainer of the Year" Purina Pro Plan 54th Annual Show Dogs Dinner
- 1986 (IMATA) International Marine Animal Trainers Association "Behavior of the Year Award" - "THE TRIPLE BOW" on two Atlantic bottle-nosed dolphins
