= Jennifer Saunders =

English comedian (born 1958)

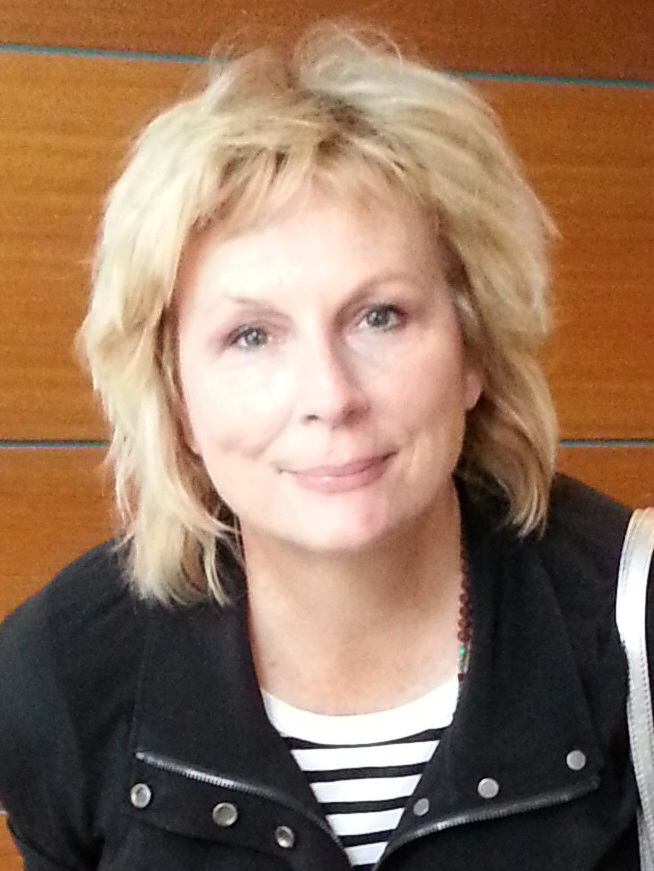
- Saunders in 2014
- Born: Jennifer Jane Saunders; 6 July 1958 (age 68); Sleaford, Lincolnshire, England
- Education: Royal Central School of Speech and Drama (BA)
- Occupations: Actress; comedian; singer; screenwriter
- Years active: 1981–present
- Notable work: The Comic Strip Presents... French and Saunders; Absolutely Fabulous
- Spouse: Adrian Edmondson (m. 1985)
- Children: 3, including Ella Edmondson and Beattie Edmondson
- Awards: BAFTA Fellowship (2009, with Dawn French)

Jennifer Jane Saunders (born 6 July 1958) is an English comedian, actress, singer, impressionist, satirist and screenwriter. Saunders originally found attention in the 1980s, when she became a member of The Comic Strip after graduating from the Royal Central School of Speech and Drama with her best friend and comedy partner, Dawn French. With French, Saunders co-wrote and starred in their eponymous sketch show, French and Saunders and later received acclaim in the 1990s for writing and playing her character Edina Monsoon in her sitcom Absolutely Fabulous. She received a BAFTA Fellowship in 2009 with French.

== Early life ==
Jennifer Jane Saunders was born on 6 July 1958 in Sleaford, Lincolnshire, England. Her mother, Barbara Jane (née Duminy), was a biology teacher, and her father, Robert Thomas Saunders, served as a pilot in the Royal Air Force (RAF). He reached the rank of group captain, and later worked for British Aerospace. Six months after her birth, Saunders' parents moved to Cyprus. Her family moved to Camberley, and then to Melksham when she was ten. She has three brothers: Tim, Peter, and Simon. As her father was in the armed forces during her childhood years, Saunders changed schools several times. She was educated from the age of five to 18 in boarding schools and then at St Paul's Girls' School, an independent school in west London. Her first year of secondary school was at a comprehensive school in Wiltshire. Her parents had wanted her to board at Stonar School. Her family moved to Cheshire in 1971 when her father left the RAF for Hawker Siddeley. At Northwich Grammar School For Girls she played in goal for the school hockey team. After school, she worked for a year in Italy as an au pair; one of her employers, Adriana Ivancich, was an inspiration for Saunder's later role in Absolutely Fabulous.

In 1977, Saunders received a place at the Central School of Speech and Drama in London on a drama teachers' course, where she met her future comedy partner, Dawn French. French and Saunders came from RAF backgrounds, and had grown up on the same base, even having had the same best friend, without ever meeting. The comic duo originally did not get on well, and as far as Saunders was concerned, French was a "cocky little upstart". The distrust was mutual: French considered Saunders snooty and uptight. French wanted to become a drama teacher, whereas Saunders loathed the idea and had not fully understood what the course was about; thus, she disliked French for being enthusiastic and confident about the course. Saunders was shocked to find that she was taking a course to become a teacher, as her mother had filled in the application form. Her mother was saddened when Saunders chose not to apply for an Oxbridge university education.

After the initial friction experienced during drama school, French and Saunders shared a flat together. French has remarked on Saunders' messy habits when sharing the house saying: "When we lived together in Chalk Farm, she had a room at the top of the house. We got broken into and the police said, 'Well, it is quite bad, but the worst is that room at the top.' And, of course, nobody had been in there." The two performed together after graduation, working the festival, cabaret, and stand-up circuits. They formed a double-act called The Menopause Sisters. Saunders described the act, which involved wearing tampons in their ears, as "cringeworthy". The manager of the club where they performed recalled, "They didn't seem to give a damn. There was no star quality about them at all."

== Career ==
=== Early career ===
French and Saunders would eventually come to public attention as members of the informal comedy collective The Comic Strip, part of the alternative comedy scene in the early 1980s. They answered a 1980 advert in The Stage newspaper looking for female comedians to perform at The Comic Strip, which had, until that point, only had male performers. When they walked into the audition, they were immediately told, "You're booked. When can you start?" They became continuing members of The Comic Strip, which included Adrian Edmondson, Rik Mayall, Peter Richardson, Nigel Planer, Pete Richens, Alexei Sayle and Robbie Coltrane.

The group performed at the Boulevard Theatre, above Soho's Raymond Revuebar, and gained a cult following, with visiting audience members including Dustin Hoffman, Jack Nicholson, and Robin Williams, who once joined in the performance. By the time French and Saunders became members of The Comic Strip, French was already working as a drama teacher, while Saunders was on the dole and spending much of her time in bed.

==== 1980s and 1990s ====
The comedy group appeared on Channel 4's first night on air, in the first episode of The Comic Strip Presents: Five Go Mad In Dorset, broadcast on 2 November 1982. In the episodes "Bad News" and "More Bad News", Saunders plays a trashy rock journalist touring with the fictional heavy metal band, Bad News.

In 1985, Saunders starred in and co-wrote Girls on Top with French, Tracey Ullman, and Ruby Wax, which portrayed four eccentric women sharing a flat in London. Saunders also appeared in Ben Elton's Happy Families where she played various members of the same family, including all four Fuddle sisters in the six-episode BBC situation comedy. Saunders starred in a Comic Strip film called The Supergrass, a parody of slick 1980s police dramas, directed by Peter Richardson. Saunders played Meryl Streep playing Arthur Scargill's wife in Strike, a Comic Strip spoof on the 1984 miners' strike. She appeared twice as a guest on The Young Ones.

In 1987, she and French created French and Saunders, a popular sketch comedy series for the BBC which sporadically aired until 2007, often with long gaps between series. Saunders also appeared in Amnesty International's The Secret Policeman's Biggest Ball live benefit in 1989, along with Dawn French and others.

Saunders and French followed separate careers as well as irregularly maintaining their comedy sketch show. Saunders' biggest solo success has been Absolutely Fabulous, based largely on a 14-minute French & Saunders sketch called "Modern Mother and Daughter". Saunders and French were going to star together, but, just as the studio had been booked, French received a long-awaited phone call confirming an adoption agency had a baby for her to adopt.

Saunders proceeded to star in the comedy. The series, which she wrote and starred in as the irresponsible fashion PR agent Edina Monsoon alongside Joanna Lumley, who played Patsy Stone, brought her international acclaim and attention. The show ran for five full series, two telemovies, three special episodes, and a feature film over the course of 24 years from 1992 to 2016. The series is also known as Ab Fab and was broadcast in the United States on Comedy Central and BBC America, becoming cult viewing.

Saunders has appeared on the American sitcoms Roseanne, playing Edina Monsoon in the episode "Satan, Darling", and Friends as Andrea Waltham, the step-mother of Emily, Ross Geller's fiancée, in the episodes "The One After Ross Says Rachel" and "The One with Ross's Wedding". Although they share no scenes, Jennifer's Absolutely Fabulous co-star June Whitfield also appeared in The One With Ross's Wedding Part Two as the Walthams' housekeeper. In 1999, she appeared alongside French in Let Them Eat Cake.

==== 2000s ====
I wanted to write something about the sort of community I was living in, why it works and how different it was. How life in the country didn't have to be sinister.

— Saunders on her motivations for creating Jam & Jerusalem

Saunders wrote and starred in a comedy drama about a Women's Institute titled Jam & Jerusalem, also known as Clatterford in the United States. The first series aired in 2006, the second in 2008, and the third in 2009 on BBC One. The show starred David Mitchell, Sally Phillips, and Sue Johnston, as well as Dawn French and Joanna Lumley.

In 2007, Saunders and psychologist Tanya Byron wrote BBC Two's The Life and Times of Vivienne Vyle about a neurotic daytime talk show host. The show ran for one series. Saunders played the eponymous character whose programme features crude headlines such as "Wife a slapper? Lie detector reveals all".

Also in 2007, the final series of French & Saunders aired. A Bucket o' French & Saunders featured a compilation of old and new sketches and aired on BBC One in September 2007. It was the third show she had written in a year. In 2008 and 2009, French & Saunders completed their final live tour, French & Saunders: Still Alive.

Saunders appeared on the "Star in a Reasonably Priced Car" segment of BBC Two's motoring show Top Gear, posting a lap time of 1:46.1s, making her the fifth-fastest guest ever in the car that was used at that time. A self-confessed petrolhead, she has a passion for Alfa Romeos and has so far owned four.

==== 2010s ====
In 2011, Saunders wrote and appeared in "Uptown Downstairs Abbey", the Comic Relief parody of the critically acclaimed historical television dramas Downton Abbey and Upstairs Downstairs. Playing the Dowager Countess, she starred alongside Lumley, Kim Cattrall, Victoria Wood, Harry Enfield, Patrick Barlow, Dale Winton, Olivia Colman, Tim Vine, Simon Callow, Michael Gambon, and Harry Hill.

In 2012, Saunders guest-starred in Dead Boss, a BBC Three comedy set in the fictional Broadmarsh prison where she plays the cruel and work-shy governor, Margaret. The show's creator, Sharon Horgan, stated that she 'begged' Saunders to take the role, having been a fan of Saunders' previous comedy work.

She also wrote the script for the Spice Girls-based jukebox musical Viva Forever!

In 2013, Saunders starred as Lady Constance Keeble in the BBC adaptation of Blandings by P. G. Wodehouse. In 2017, Saunders appeared on the Simpsons episode "Looking for Mr. Goodbart" as an elderly woman accompanied around by Bart.

==== 2020s ====
In June 2026, Saunders was announced to be joining the cast of the sixth season of the mystery comedy-drama series Only Murders in the Building in a recurring role.

=== Film ===
Saunders has also appeared in several films, such as In the Bleak Midwinter (1995), Muppet Treasure Island (1996), Fanny & Elvis (1999), and also made cameo appearances in the Spice Girls' film Spice World (1997) and Absolument fabuleux (2001), a French film based on Absolutely Fabulous.

In the animated film, Shrek 2 (2004), she provided the voice of the Fairy Godmother and sang the songs "The Fairy Godmother Song" and "Holding Out for a Hero". Her part took only four days to record. The sequel broke the first Shrek's own box office record in the U.S in just a fortnight, and it proceeded to make $353 million in just three weeks in the U.S. Her role won the People's Choice Award for the best movie villain in 2005.

She voiced Miss Spink in the animated film Coraline, in which her comedy partner Dawn French voiced a character called Miss Forcible. In 2015, she voiced Queen Elizabeth II in the animated film Minions, and in 2016, she voiced Miss Nana Noodleman in the animated film Sing, reprising the role again in Sing 2.

In 2022, she starred in Death on the Nile as Marie Van Schuyler alongside Dawn French, Gal Gadot and Kenneth Branagh who also directed the film.

=== Theatre ===
In 2018, Saunders appeared at the Vaudeville Theatre in the production of Lady Windermere's Fan as The Duchess of Berwick.

In June 2019, she appeared on stage in the production of Noël Coward's play, Blithe Spirit, as eccentric clairvoyant Madam Arcati. The show first opened at Theatre Royal Bath, and after a short tour of England it later transferred to the Duke of York's Theatre, London in March 2020. Two weeks into its run performances were cancelled due to the pandemic.

She reprised the role in autumn 2021 for eight weeks in the West End at The Harold Pinter Theatre.

In 2022, Saunders played the role of Mother Superior in Sister Act the Musical for six weeks at the Eventim Apollo Hammersmith, alongside Beverley Knight as Deloris Van Cartier.

In December 2023, Saunders made her pantomime debut as Captain Hook in Peter Pan at the London Palladium alongside Julian Clary, Paul Zerdin, Nigel Havers, Gary Wilmot, Rob Madge, Francis Mayli McCann and Louis Gaunt.

In March 2026, it was announced that she would play alongside Dawn French in Cinderella at the London Palladium.

== Personal life ==
Saunders, who grew up in nearby Acton Bridge, married Adrian Edmondson at Christ Church, Crowton, Cheshire on 11 May 1985. At the wedding were fellow Comic Strip members Rik Mayall (Edmondson's longtime comedy partner) and Robbie Coltrane, whom the vicar, Rev Austin Oates, much to his surprise, described as 'delightful and charming'. The reception was held at Jennifer's parents' home. Afterwards the couple visited Saint Lucia.

They have three daughters: singer-songwriter Ella Edmondson (b. 1986), actress Beattie Edmondson (b. 1987), and Freya Edmondson (b. 1990). They have five grandchildren together.

In July 2010, Saunders announced that she had been diagnosed with breast cancer the previous October, and was in remission following a lumpectomy, chemotherapy, and radiotherapy.

Saunders published her autobiography, Bonkers: My Life in Laughs, in October 2013.

She is a patron for Smart Works Charity, a non-profit organisation supporting unemployed women into work through clothing and coaching.

== Filmography ==
=== Film ===
Year	Film	Role	Notes
1985	The Supergrass	Lesley Reynolds	The Comic Strip Presents
1987	Eat the Rich	Lady Caroline	The Comic Strip Presents
1995	In the Bleak Midwinter	Nancy Crawford	Cameo appearance
1996	Muppet Treasure Island	Mrs. Bluveridge	
1997	Spice World	Fashionable Woman	Cameo appearance
1999	Fanny & Elvis	Roanna	
1999	The Comedy Trail: A Shaggy Dog Story	Herself	TV special
2001	Absolument Fabuleux	Herself	French adaptation of the series; cameo appearance
2004	Shrek 2	Fairy Godmother	Voice
2006	L'Entente Cordiale	Gwendoline McFarlane	French film
2009	Coraline	Miss April Spink	Voice
2015	Minions	The Queen	Voice
2016	Absolutely Fabulous: The Movie	Edina Monsoon	Also writer
2016	Sing	Nana Noodleman	Voice
2018	Chuck Steel: Night of the Trampires	Dr. Alex Cular	Voice
2018	Patrick	Maureen	
2019	Isn't It Romantic	Natalie's mother	Cameo appearance
2021	Sing 2	Nana Noodleman	Voice cameo
2022	Death on the Nile	Marie Van Schuyler	
2023	Allelujah	Sister Gilpin	
2023	Sumotherhood	DI Brookes	
2024	Man and Witch: The Dance of a Thousand Steps	Goose	Voice
2024	200% Wolf	Max	Voice
2026	The Magic Faraway Tree	Grandma Thompson	
2026	Virginia Woolf's Night and Day	Bess Hilbery	

=== Television ===
Year	Programme	Role	Notes
1982–1984	The Young Ones	Helen Mucus/Sue	2 episodes: "Interesting" and "Time"
1982–1998, 2011–2012	The Comic Strip Presents...	Various characters	Main cast 30 episodes (plus 6 specials)
1983	The Entertainers	Herself with Dawn French	1 episode
1984	Wogan	Herself with Dawn French	Guest, 1 episode
1984	The Lenny Henry Show	Various characters	1 episode with Dawn French
1985	Happy Families	Granny Fuddle/Joyce Fuddle/Cassie Fuddle/Madeleine Fuddle/Roxanne Fuddle	Main cast (6 episodes)
1985–1986	Girls on Top	Jennifer Marsh	13 episodes
1986	Dangerous Brothers Present: World of Danger	Anita Harris	1 segment, 'How to get off with a lady'
1987–2007	French and Saunders	Various characters	Main cast (48 episodes)
1989	Juke Box Jury	Panelist with Dawn French	1 episode
1990	Rita Rudner		1 episode
1990	The Tale of Little Pig Robinson	Dorcas	TV movie
1990	Good Morning Britain	Herself with Dawn French	Guest, 1 episode
1990–1993	Going Live!	Herself	Guest, 3 episodes
1991	Clive Anderson Talks Back	Herself with Dawn French	Guest, 1 episode
1991–1992	The Full Wax	Herself	Guest/co-host, 4 episodes
1992–1996; 2001–2004; 2011–2012	Absolutely Fabulous	Edina Monsoon	Also creator and writer 32 episodes (plus 7 aired specials)
1993	Prince Cinders	Fairy	Voice
1995	Queen of the East	Lady Hester Stanhope	
1995–2006	Jools' Annual Hootenanny	Guest, 3 episodes	
1996	Roseanne	Edina Monsoon	1 episode: "Satan, Darling"
1996	10th Annual American Comedy Awards	Presenter with Joanna Lumley	Presenting 'The Funniest Female Performer in a TV Series' Award
1997	Light Lunch	Herself	Guest, 2 episodes
1997	Dusty: Full Circle – The Life & Music of Dusty Springfield	Host with Dawn French	Documentary
1998	Friends	Andrea Waltham	2 episodes: "The One with Ross's Wedding: Part Two" and "The One After Ross Says Rachel"
1998	Late Lunch	Herself	Guest, 1 episode
1999	Let Them Eat Cake	Colombine, Comtesse de Vache	6 episodes
1999	The Magician's House	The Rat	Voice
1999	The Nearly Complete & Utter History of Everything	The Egg	1 episode with Dawn French
1999	Live & Kicking	Herself	Guest, 2 episodes
2000	Mirrorball	Vivienne Keill	TV pilot. Also writer
2000	The Priory	Herself with Dawn French	Guest, 1 episode
2000	TFI Friday	Herself with Dawn French	Guest, 1 episode
2000–2007	Parkinson	Herself	Guest, 3 episodes
2002	Pongwiffy	Sharkadder	Voice
2004	The Kumars at No. 42	Herself	Guest, 1 episode
2006	Dawn French's Girls Who Do Comedy	Herself	3 episodes
2006–2009	Jam & Jerusalem	Caroline Martin	Also creator & writer
2007	The Life and Times of Vivienne Vyle	Vivienne Vyle	6 episodes
2007–2016	Top Gear	Herself	Guest, 2 episodes
2008	The Paul O'Grady Show	Herself	Guest, 1 episode
2008–2016	Loose Women	Herself	Guest, 4 episodes
2008–2020	The Graham Norton Show	Herself	Guest, 9 episodes
2008–2023	The One Show	Herself	Guest, 6 episodes
2011	Jennifer Saunders: Laughing at the 90's	Herself/presenter	C4 Documentary
2011–2014	This Is Jinsy	Miss Reason	11 episodes
2012	Dead Boss	Governor Margaret	6 episodes
2012	Jennifer Saunders: Back in the Saddle	Herself	2 part Documentary
2013–2014	Blandings	Lady Constance Keeble	13 episodes
2013–2014	Alan Carr: Chatty Man	Herself	Guest, 2 Eepisodes
2013–2016	This Morning	Herself	Guest, 2 Eepisodes
2013–2020	Have I Got News for You	Herself	Guest Presenter, 5 episodes
2014	The Boy in the Dress	Miss Windsor	TV movie
2014	Jamie & Jimmy's Friday Night Feast	Herself	Guest with Adrian Edmondson
2014	The Jonathan Ross Show	Herself	Guest, 1 episode
2014	The Last Leg	Herself	Guest, 1 episode
2014	The Guess List	Herself	Panelist, 1 episode
2015	Stick Man	Narrator	TV movie
2015	The Vicar of Dibley	Reverend Jen	Comic Relief Special
2015	The Classic Car Show	Herself	1 episode
2015	The Great Comic Relief Bake Off	Herself	Contestant
2015	Mel & Sue	Herself	Guest, 1 episode
2015	A League of Their Own	Herself	Team Member, 1 episode
2015–2017	Josh	Judith	3 episodes
2017	The Simpsons	Phoebe	Voice, 1 episode: "Looking for Mr. Goodbart"
2017	Grandpa's Great Escape	Miss Dandy	TV movie
2017	Saturday Kitchen	Herself	Guest
2017	Joanna & Jennifer: Absolutely Champers	Herself/co-presenter	One-off BBC Documentary, co-presented by Joanna Lumley
2017	300 Years of French & Saunders	Special with Dawn French	30th Anniversary Special
2018	RHS Chelsea Flower Show	Herself	Presenter, 1 episode: "The A-Z of the RHS Chelsea Flower Show"
2019	Thunderbirds Are Go	Helen Shelby	Voice, 1 episode: "Deep Water"
2019–2022	Moominvalley	Mymble	Voice; 4 episodes
2019–2021	There's Something About Movies	Team Captain	Series 2–4
2020	The Stranger	Heidi Doyle	Netflix mini-series
2020	Would I Lie to You?	Herself	Panelist
2020	Richard Osman's House of Games	Herself	Contestant
2020	Jennifer Saunders' Memory Lane	Presenter	One-off ITV special
2021	Mel Giedroyc: Unforgivable	Herself	Guest
2021	French & Saunders: Funny Women	Special with Dawn French	UK Gold Special
2021	Best Birthday Ever	Mother	Voice
2021	Ghosts	Lavinia	Episode: "He Came!"
2022	The Pentaverate	Maester of Dubrovnik/Saester of Dubrovnik	Netflix mini-series
2023	Intelligence	Joanna Telfer-Fotheringham	Episode: "A Special Agent Special"
2023	imagine… French & Saunders: Pointed, Bitchy, Bitter	Herself	One-off documentary
2024	The Masked Singer	Herself	Guest Judge (series 5)
2024	Celebrity Gogglebox	Herself; with Beattie Edmondson	Series 6 Netflix mini-series
2025	Too Much	Fiona	Episode 9 : "Enough, Actually" Netflix mini-series
2025	Amandaland Christmas Special	Aunt Joan	Christmas special

== Writer ==
- 2016: Absolutely Fabulous: The Movie (writer)
- 2012: Viva Forever! (writer)
- 2006: Jam & Jerusalem (16 episodes, 2006–2009)
- 2008: French and Saunders Still Alive (V) (writer)
- 2007: The Life and Times of Vivienne Vyle (6 episodes, 2007)
- 2007: A Bucket o' French & Saunders (5 episodes, 2007)
- 2001: Absolument fabuleux (creator: TV series Absolutely Fabulous)
- 2000: Mirrorball (TV) (writer)
- 2000: French & Saunders Live (V) (writer)
- 1999: The Nearly Complete and Utter History of Everything (TV) (writer)
- 1998: Absolutely Fabulous: A Life (V) (writer)
- 1998: Absolutely Fabulous: Absolutely Not! (V) (original idea)
- 1996: Roseanne (1 episode, 1996)
- 1993: French and Saunders Live (V) (writer)
- 1992: Absolutely Fabulous (38 episodes, 1992–2012)
- 1991: Comic Relief (TV) (uncredited)
- 1987: French and Saunders (38 episodes, 1987–2005)
- 1986: Comic Relief (TV) (writer)
- 1984: The Comic Strip Presents... (2 episodes, 1984–1986)
- 1985: Girls on Top TV series (unknown episodes)
- 1981: The Comic Strip (TV) (writer)

== Bibliography ==
- Absolutely Fabulous: Continuity
- Absolutely Fabulous (scripts from the show)
- Absolutely Fabulous 2 (more scripts from the show)
- A Feast of French and Saunders (with Dawn French)

Autobiography

- Bonkers: My Life in Laughs (Viking, 2013)

== Awards and recognition ==
Along with Dawn French, Saunders declined an OBE in 2001.

In 2003, she was listed in The Observer as one of the 50 funniest acts in British comedy. Saunders was placed 93rd out of E!'s 100 Sexiest British Stars. She also came 18th for Best British Role Models for teenage girls in Britain according to Good Housekeeping Magazine.

Saunders was awarded an honorary doctorate by the University of Exeter in July 2007. In July 2011, she was awarded an honorary doctorate by Edge Hill University.

In 2005, Saunders was named the fourth funniest woman in Britain in a poll of 4,000 women. She has been nominated for and received many awards, including:

=== Won ===
- 1991: Writers' Guild of Great Britain Award for TV Light Entertainment – French & Saunders
- 1993: BAFTA Television Award for Best Comedy Series for – Absolutely Fabulous (shared with Jon Plowman and Bob Spiers)
- 1993: Writers' Guild of Great Britain Award TV for Situation Comedy – Absolutely Fabulous
- 1993: British Comedy Award for Top Female Performer
- 2002: Honorary Rose Award – awarded with Dawn French
- 2005: People's Choice Award for Favourite Movie Villain – Shrek 2
- 2009: BAFTA Fellowship – awarded with Dawn French
- 2012: BAFTA Television Award for Best Female Performance In a Comedy Programme – Absolutely Fabulous

=== Nominated ===
- 1993: BAFTA Television Award for Best Light Entertainment Performance for – Absolutely Fabulous
- 1993: British Comedy Award for Best Comedy Actress – Absolutely Fabulous
- 1994: British Comedy Award for Best TV Comedy Actress – Absolutely Fabulous
- 1995: BAFTA Television Award for Best Comedy Series for – Absolutely Fabulous (shared with Jon Plowman and Bob Spiers)
- 1996: BAFTA Television Award for Best Comedy Series for – Absolutely Fabulous (shared with Jon Plowman and Bob Spiers)
- 1997: BAFTA Television Award for Best Comedy Series for – Absolutely Fabulous (shared with Jon Plowman, Bob Spiers and Janice Thomas)
- 2026: BAFTA Television Award for Best Female Comedy Performance for Amandaland

== See also ==
- List of people who have declined a British honour
