= After Words (film) =

- Directed by: Juan Feldman
- Produced by: Juan Feldman
- Starring: Marcia Gay Harden; Huguette Urhausen; Ron Canada; Óscar Jaenada; Jenna Ortega
- Cinematography: Salvador Lleo de la Fe
- Music by: Andrew Gross
- Release date: August 21, 2015
- Country: United States

After Words is a 2015 American film shot in Costa Rica.

== Plot ==
A librarian who has lost her job and is suicidal decides to take a final, wonderful trip to Costa Rica before swallowing a bottle of pills. Once there, she meets a younger man, a vibrant tour guide who takes her to all the beautiful places, and becomes intrigued by her aloof intellectualism. He works hard to draw her out, to get her to embrace the Costa Rican motto, "Pura Vida," which means "pure life" but, more broadly, encompasses the national exuberance for living. She inspires him to read the first book he has ever read, and he encourages her to have some fun, relax, and loosen up for the first time in too many years. An unusual but lovely romantic relationship evolves.

== Cast ==
- Marcia Gay Harden
- Huguette Urhausen
- Ron Canada
- Óscar Jaenada
- Jenna Ortega

== Reception ==
Rotten Tomatoes, a review aggregator, reports that 38% of eight surveyed critics gave the film a positive review; the average rating is 5.6/10.
