= Lightning round =

Round of a game or contest with limited time

A lightning round is a round of a game or contest in which the duration of the round is a pre-determined length of time, and the goal is typically to accomplish as much as possible within that period. The most common format of a lightning round is in a question-and-answer game, to answer as many questions as possible within a given time limit. The term "lightning round" is usually reserved for a single round in a game whose normal gameplay is untimed. Lightning rounds are often used at quiz bowls.

In television, a lightning round is usually accompanied by an indicator of the time remaining, and is commonly presented with some increase of intensity, such as a change of lighting, or sound effect (such as a ticking clock), or musical cue.

== History and origins ==
According to the Oxford English Dictionary, the earliest recorded usage of the term "lightning round" in print appeared in 1961 in the Bridgeport Telegram, used in reference to early American quiz show formats like It's Academic. The mechanics of a timed, rapid-fire segment developed during the U.S. television game show expansion of the late 1950s and early 1960s, providing a definitive mechanism to break ties or accelerate the game pace before commercial breaks.

The game show Password, which premiered in October 1961 on CBS, was the first television program to formally name its endgame the "Lightning Round". In this segment, a contestant attempted to guess five hidden words from one-word clues provided by their celebrity partner within a 60-second limit.

== Implementation in media ==
=== Game show variations ===
Following its introduction on Password, variations of the fast-paced, timed endgame became standard features across American daytime and syndicated television formats:

- Family Feud: Introduced the "Fast Money" round in 1976, where two family members independently answer five questions within a 20-second (later 25-second) time limit to achieve a cumulative score of 200 points.
- The $25,000 Pyramid: Utilized the "Winner's Circle" endgame, requiring a celebrity or contestant to describe six distinct categories to their partner within 60 seconds.
- Jeopardy!: While the main game rounds are timed via a hidden clock, the show does not use a rapid-fire endgame, though the final minutes of the first two rounds are frequently referred to colloquially as a race against the commercial buzzer when multiple clues remain on the board.

=== Academic and corporate environments ===
Outside of entertainment broadcast media, the format has been adapted for academic conferences and business symposia, often under the name "lightning talks." Speakers are allotted brief presentation windows—typically between three and five minutes—enforced by a timekeeper, to summarize research findings, project proposals, or technical methods using a restricted number of visual slides.

=== Popular culture ===
The term was used in the Friends season four episode "The One with the Embryos", wherein the characters compete in a custom-designed trivia contest created by Ross Geller. The final tie-breaking segment is designated as a "lightning round" with a 30-second limit.

== See also ==
- Speed chess
- Time limit
