= Headstrong (play) =

Play by Patrick Link

- Written by: Patrick Link
- Original language: English
- Subject: Concussions in professional sports

Premiere
- Date premiered: April 2012
- Place premiered: The Ensemble Studio Theatre

Headstrong is an American play by Patrick Link, commissioned by the EST/Sloan Project. It premiered at The Ensemble Studio Theatre in April 2012.

The play explores the research behind concussions in professional sports and depicts a fictional former linebacker who must come to terms with the long-term consequences he may suffer from playing the game he loves. Headstrong was noted in an article on Grantland, in addition to other sites, to illustrate the growing public awareness of CTE. In 2013, the play was recorded by LA Theatre Works as part of its Relativity Series, featuring Ernie Hudson and Scott Wolf.
