= Jan Etherington =

British writer, journalist and producer

Jan Etherington is a British writer, journalist and producer.

== Early life ==
She attended Tiffin Girls' School.

== Career ==
She first came to prominence as creator and writer of Second Thoughts along with her husband Gavin Petrie. Second Thoughts was originally a radio series (1988–1992) before being turned into a television series starring James Bolam, Belinda Lang, Lynda Bellingham and Julia Sawalha and broadcast for five series on ITV (1991–1994).

This husband and wife partnership also created BBC sitcom Next of Kin which aired for three series (1995–1997) starring Penelope Keith and William Gaunt in the lead roles.

Following the success of Second Thoughts a sequel was created in the shape of Faith in the Future also starring Lynda Bellingham and Julia Sawalha in their original character roles. This aired for three series, again on ITV (1995–1998).

Petrie and Etherington then went on to create, write and produce a final sitcom for ITV Duck Patrol starring Richard Wilson, David Tennant and Samantha Beckinsale. It was less successful than their previous series and lasted for just seven episodes in 1998 before being axed by ITV.

Joanna Lumley and Roger Allam star in Conversations from a Long Marriage, a BBC Radio Four comedy written by Etherington that began in 2018.

== Writing credits ==
- Second Thoughts (1991–1994)
- Next of Kin (1995–1997)
- Faith in the Future (1995–1998)
- Duck Patrol (1998)
- The Change (radio show, Nov 2001–Nov 2003)
- Conversations from a Long Marriage (radio show, 2018–2025)

== Production credits ==
- Duck Patrol
