= Gavin Petrie =

British writer and producer (1942–2025)

Gavin Petrie (6 April 1942 – 5 November 2025) was a British writer and producer, known for writing television and radio comedy programs in collaboration with his wife Jan Etherington.

== Early life ==
Petrie was born in Edinburgh on 6 April 1942. He was employed there at age 15 by the Daily Mail, and in his nine years at that newspaper he became a writer and cartoonist.

== Career ==
Petrie moved to London in the late 1960s and worked as a music journalist, eventually becoming editor of Disc and Music Echo.

He first came to prominence as creator and writer of Second Thoughts along with his wife Jan Etherington. Second Thoughts was originally a radio series (1988–1992) before being turned into a television series starring James Bolam, Belinda Lang, Lynda Bellingham and Julia Sawalha and broadcast for five series on ITV (1991-4).

This husband and wife partnership also created BBC sitcom Next of Kin which aired for three series (1995-7) starring Penelope Keith and William Gaunt in the lead roles.

Following the success of Second Thoughts, a sequel was created in the shape of Faith in the Future also starring Lynda Bellingham and Julia Sawalha in their original character roles. This aired for three series, again on ITV (1995-8).

Petrie and Etherington then went on to create, write and produce a final sitcom for ITV Duck Patrol starring Richard Wilson, David Tennant and Samantha Beckinsale. It was less successful than their previous series and lasted for just seven episodes in 1998 before being axed by ITV.

== Personal life and death ==
Petrie married Jan Etherington in 1984. They lived at first in Sunbury, moving to coastal Suffolk in 2013. Petrie had two stepchildren from Etherington's first marriage. He was diagnosed with Alzheimer's disease in the late 2010s; Etherington wrote about the difficulties of caring for him and watching his decline. He died on 5 November 2025, at the age of 83.

== Writing credits ==
- Second Thoughts (1991–1994)
- Next of Kin (1995–1997)
- Faith in the Future (1995–1998)
- Duck Patrol (1998)

== Production credits ==
- Duck Patrol
