= The Change (radio show) =

The Change was a British radio Sitcom that originally aired from November 2001 - November 2004, running for 3 series on BBC Radio 4.

Written by Jan Etherington and Gavin Petrie it was a "Sitcom about a troubled hormonal wife and a transvestite husband".

The story follows motor mechanic, George (Christopher Ellison), who announces he is a transvestite to his wife Carol (Lynda Bellingham), who is undergoing "the change". George's mother Violet (Sylvia Syms) has known about his "dressing-up" since his childhood and sees nothing wrong in it.

Other parts were played by Maureen Beattie, Mark Powley, Kevin Bishop, Richard Standing, Emma Kennedy and James Vaughan.
