= Diana Magness =

British actress

Diana Magness (born 20 July 1981) is a British actress. Magness is most known for her role as Evelyn Wright in 40 episodes of BBC children's drama series Grange Hill from 1997 to 2001.

She is also known for her role as Roxanne in BBC sitcom Next of Kin during the show's 2nd and 3rd series from 1996 to 1997.
