= Matthew Scurfield =

English actor (born 1948)

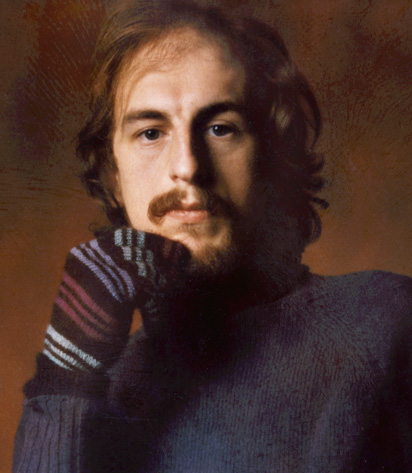
- Scurfield, c. 1975
- Born: Matthew Scurfield; 2 February 1948 (age 78); Cambridge, Cambridgeshire, England
- Occupation: Actor
- Years active: 1971–present

Matthew Scurfield (born 2 February 1948) is an English actor and the eldest child of author, poet, and politician George Bazeley Scurfield and his wife Cecilia (née Hopkinson).

His autobiography, I Could Be Anyone, was published in 2008 (ISBN 978-0-9556952-0-9).

== Theatre ==
- Two Gentlemen of Verona (The Duke of Milan / Antonio), The Globe 1996 season;
- The Life of Henry the Fifth (The Duke of Exeter), The Globe 1997 season;
- A Chaste Maid in Cheapside, (Mr. Yellowhammer), The Globe 1997 season;
- The Street of Crocodiles (Father) at the Théâtre de Complicité and the National Theatre;
- The Trial (Huld) at the National Theatre;
- Die Fledermaus (Frosch) with the English National Opera;
- A Flea in the Ear at the Old Vic;
- Apart from George (George) at the National Theatre.

== Television ==
- The Sweeney, " Jack Or Knave" (1978) – Kieran Kennedy
- The Hitchhiker's Guide to the Galaxy (1981) – Number One
- Open All Hours, 1 episode (1981) – Man from Bus Stop
- Educating Marmalade Atkins (1982) – Sister Purification
- The Secret Adversary (1983) – Conrad
- Bulman (1985) – Eddie 'The Snout'
- Boon (1986) – Sergeant Wilson
- The Ruth Rendell Mysteries, 2 episodes (1988) – Will Palmer
- The Bill 3 episodes (1988–1990) – Sergeant Coles / Norris
- Monster Maker (1989) – Vaughn
- Shelley (1990) – Saul
- A Murder of Quality (1991) – Inspector Rigby
- Blue Heaven in episode "Pilot" (1992) – Jim
- Minder (1994) – Frankie
- Time After Time (1994–1995) – Sergeant Dawes
- Sharpe's Honour (1994) – El Matarife
- Wycliffe (1995) – D.S. Rinnick
- Pie in the Sky (1996) – Roger Hoskins
- Hetty Wainthropp Investigates (1996) – Oliver Hardiman
- Karaoke (1996) – Impatient patient
- Dangerfield (1996) – Martin Ryder
- Cosmic Sucker (1997) – Jack McHine
- A Dance to the Music of Time (1997) – Major Finn
- Kavanagh QC (1998) – Dr. Ralph Dutton Jones
- Waking the Dead (2003) – Inspector Tynan
- Game of Thrones, Series 1 Episode 8 (2011) – Vayon Poole

== Film ==
- Sweeney 2 (1978) – Jefferson
- McVicar (1980) – Streaky Jeffries
- Raiders of the Lost Ark (1981) – 2nd. Nazi
- The Jigsaw Man (1983) – KGB man No. 1
- Nineteen Eighty-Four (1984) – Guard #2
- Dakota Road (1992) – Bernard Cross
- Black Beauty (1994) – Horse Dealer
- Look Me in the Eye (1994) – Clerk
- Amy Foster/Swept from the Sea (1997) – Thackery
- A Different Loyalty (2004) – Anton Zakharov
- Do Re Mi Fa (2016) – Bozo's Conscience
