= Tell Tarby =

1973 British television comedy series

Tell Tarby is a British television comedy series which aired in 1973. Cast included Jimmy Tarbuck, Lynda Bellingham, Josephine Tewson, Stanley Unwin and Frank Williams. All six episodes are missing, believed lost.
