= Faith in the Future (TV series) =

- Genre: Comedy
- Written by: Jan Etherington; Gavin Petrie
- Directed by: Sylvie Boden
- Starring: Lynda Bellingham; Simon Pegg; Jeff Rawle; Julia Sawalha
- Country of origin: United Kingdom
- Original language: English
- No. of series: 3
- No. of episodes: 22

Production
- Running time: 22 minutes
- Production company: LWT

Original release
- Network: ITV
- Release: 17 November 1995 – 27 February 1998

Related
- Second Thoughts

Faith in the Future is a British comedy television show running from 17 November 1995 to 27 February 1998. A sequel to the show Second Thoughts, it aired on ITV for 22 episodes.

The show continues the story of Faith Greyshott (Lynda Bellingham), newly single after splitting from her long-term partner, Bill, at the end of Second Thoughts. With her daughter Hannah (Julia Sawalha) away travelling and her son Joe now in a shared flat, Faith decides it's time to stop being a wife and mother and live her life for herself; however, her plans are scuppered when Hannah returns and moves back home.

Paul Brady's track The World Is What You Make It is the theme song for the series.

The series has been repeated on ITV3 and Rewind TV.

== Characters ==
- Faith (Lynda Bellingham) - A 40-something, divorced mother of two looking to rebuild her life following the break-up of her long-term relationship. Formerly a commercial artist, she begins working as an art teacher at a local college where she meets upholsterer Paul, who becomes her on-off boyfriend. Although keen to put herself first and enjoy life as a single woman, issues such as Hannah's return and the menopause get in the way.
- Hannah (Julia Sawalha) - Faith's headstrong daughter, who returns home after a year travelling expecting to live with her mother again, only to find she has sold the family home and now lives alone. Having dropped out of university in Second Thoughts, she takes on a variety of unsuccessful jobs, including dressing as a giant mouse to promote cheese, before deciding to train as a counsellor. Like her mother, she has a difficult love life, having several failed relationships.
- Paul (Jeff Rawle) - Faith's on-off boyfriend; an upholsterer who also teaches at the college. Although attracted to Faith, he is constantly frustrated by her regular changes of heart and erratic behaviour.
- Jools (Charlie Creed-Miles - (Series 1); Simon Pegg - Series 2–3) - A kind-hearted, but somewhat naive, young man who becomes obsessed with Hannah after she is dumped by his friend Nick. He is notoriously clumsy and accident-prone (to the point that he thinks it is his fault when a tree crashes through Faith's window). Although other women, including Hannah's friend Caroline and Faith's friend Jill, show an interest in him, Jools only has eyes for Hannah, despite her continuing disparagement of him.

=== Minor characters ===
- Joe (Mark Denham) - Faith's son. A regular character in Second Thoughts, he appears in just one episode of Faith in the Future (II/12), when he visits to tell his mother that, because the Young Conservative's president at his university has become his girlfriend, he has become a Conservative - which horrifies Faith.
- Caroline (Emma Bernard) - Hannah's long-time best friend who has an affair with Jools, despite being married with a child. She later splits from her husband Dave, but is apparently oblivious to the signs that he is actually gay.
- Zoë (Susannah Wise) - Faith's eldest daughter whom she gave up for adoption prior to her marriage, and whose existence is only revealed in the final series. She is a somewhat innocent, naïve girl who contrasts sharply with the more gregarious Hannah.
- Harry (Christopher Villiers) - Hannah's tutor in the third series, later her boyfriend. He asks her to move in with him in the penultimate episode, but, when she catches him cheating on her, she decides to go travelling with Jools instead.
- Mark (Ivan Kaye) - A builder whom Hannah thinks is chatting her up, when he is actually interested in Faith and begins dating her towards the end of the series.
- Jill (Tricia George) - A friend of Faith, who also appeared in Second Thoughts.

== Episode guide ==
=== Series 1: 1995 ===
No.	Title	Original release date
1	"Should I Stay or Should I Go?"	17 November 1995
2	"Naked Ambition"	24 November 1995
3	"Prickly Heat"	1 December 1995
4	"Break Up Break Down"	8 December 1995
5	"Odd Job"	15 December 1995
6	"Food of Love"	22 December 1995
7	"A Moving Moment"	29 December 1995

=== Series 2: 1996 ===
No.	Title	Original release date
8	"Marks Out of Ten"	8 November 1996
9	"Wrong Moves"	15 November 1996
10	"The Big Test"	22 November 1996
11	"A Knight Out"	29 November 1996
12	"Young and Foolish"	6 December 1996
13	"Design Flaw"	13 December 1996
14	"Art Lovers"	20 December 1996
Faith takes a group of elderly art students to France. Hilarity ensues.
15	"Body Language"	27 December 1996

=== Series 3: 1998 ===
No.	Title	Original release date
16	"Surprise, Surprise!"	9 January 1998
17	"Share Options"	16 January 1998
18	"Hearts and Flowers"	23 January 1998
Paul gets shock news from abroad, while Hannah and Jools wake up in the same bed unable to remember what happened.
19	"Goodbye to Love"	6 February 1998
20	"Always On My Mind"	13 February 1998
21	"Prodigal Mother"	20 February 1998
22	"Stand by Me"	27 February 1998

== DVD release ==
The Complete Series of Faith in the Future was released by Network on 13 April 2015.
