= George Bazeley Scurfield =

English author, poet, and politician

George Scurfield
- Born: George Bazeley Scurfield; 19 March 1920; Leicestershire, England
- Died: 15 December 1991 (aged 71); Norwich, England
- Occupations: author, poet, politician
- Political party: Labour Party
- Spouse: Cecilia Hopkinson Scurfield
- Children: Matthew Scurfield
- Awards: Military Cross

George Bazeley Scurfield (19 March 1920 – 15 December 1991) was an English author, poet, and politician. He was also a decorated veteran of World War II.

== Early life ==
Schurfield was born on 19 March 1920 in Leicestershire, England.

== World War II ==
During World War II, Scurfield served as an officer with the Royal Artillery in the Middle East. He was awarded the Military Cross for his wartime services in the Far East. This military decoration is awarded to officers of the British Army in recognition of an act or acts of exemplary gallantry during active operations against the enemy.

== Politics ==
In the 1960s Scurfield entered municipal politics. He twice ran in Cambridge City Council, England elections as a Labour Party candidate. First in Market Ward, in May 1962 when he came in 3rd, losing to the Liberal candidate, Peter Calvert. In May 1963 Scurfield was elected to City Council in Petersfield, where he served through 1965. In September 1967 Scurfield again ran for City Council in Cambridge, placing second to the Conservative candidate, David Lane. He was the Labour Candidate for Cambridge in the 1970 General Election.

== Cook books ==
Scurfield and his wife Cecilia wrote two books on home baking. The first, Home Baked, about the process of hand baking bread, was originally published in 1956. The companion volume, Home-Made Cakes and Biscuits, was first published in 1975.

== Personal life and death ==
Schurfield married his wife Cecilia (née Hopkinson) in 1947 in Cambridge, England. They had five children: Sarah, Lucy, Poly, Sophy, and the actor Matthew Scurfield.

Schurfield died on 15 December 1991 in Norwich, England.

== Published poems ==
- Poets of Tomorrow, Second Selection (containing five poems by George Scurfield), published by Cambridge Poetry (Hogarth Press, 1940).
- The Song of a Red Turtle, a book of poems published by Timbimuttu (London, 1941), 19 pages.
- "Brother If You Could See Me Now", Seven Magazine of People's Writing (April - June, 1944)
- "The Colonel", Seven Magazine of People's Writing (July - September, 1944)
- "Evening", Seven Magazine of People's Writing (October - December, 1944
- "Song and Dance" published in "The War Decade: An Anthology of the 1940s" by Andrew Sinclair, 1989 (page 34)

George Scurfield is referenced in Tambittu's Poetry in Wartime by H.M. Klein, an anthology of war poetry.

== Novels ==
- The Bamboo House, published by Michael Joseph Ltd. (London, 1950).
- Alone With Our Day, published by Michael Joseph Ltd. (London, 1952).

== Non-fiction ==
- A Stickful of Nonpareil, with illustrations by Edward Ardizzone, published by Cambridge University Press, 1956. This 58-page book, (15 illustrations in the text) contained reminiscence of sixty years at the Cambridge University Press, and was printed in a limited edition of only 500 copies for presentation at Christmas.
- Gardening for Fun by George Scurfield, published 1959.
- Home Baked, A Little Book of Bread Recipes (ISBN 0-571-09844-4), by George and Cecilia Scurfield, Illustrated by Nora Kay. (1959), 86 pages.
- Home-Made Cakes and Biscuits (ISBN 1 897959 109), by George and Cecilia Scurfield.
- New York Times Menu Cook Book, by George and Cecilia Scurfield, published by H&R (New York, 1966).
- Fakenham and Folkestone Etcetera (ISBN 0948400072), published by The Larks Press, 1988, 356 pages.
- The Bitter Mangoes, memoirs of his years at St John's and his wartime service in the Far East for which he was awarded the Military Cross, 1938–45. Written in 1991. 101 pages.
