= Margery & Gladys =

- DVD cover
- Written by: John Flanagan; Andrew McCulloch
- Directed by: Geoffrey Sax
- Starring: Penelope Keith; June Brown; Roger Lloyd-Pack; Martin Freeman
- Music by: Philip Pope
- Country of origin: United Kingdom
- Original language: English

Production
- Executive producer: Sharon Bloom
- Producer: Tim Hutchinson
- Cinematography: Chris O'Dell
- Editor: Nick Arthurs
- Running time: 98 minutes
- Production company: Carlton Television

Original release
- Network: ITV
- Release: 21 September 2003

Margery & Gladys is a one-off television drama film, first broadcast on 21 September 2003. Starring Penelope Keith and June Brown as the title characters, it was produced by Carlton Television for ITV and directed by Geoffrey Sax. Upon first broadcast, it was watched by a total of 7.91 million viewers.

The film was also screened on RTÉ One in Ireland. It was repeated on ITV3 on 6 March 2016, its first repeat in the United Kingdom since its original broadcast in 2003. The film was released on DVD in Australia in July 2012 by Madman Entertainment.

== Plot ==
Recently widowed Margery Heywood (Penelope Keith) and her cleaning woman Gladys Gladwell (June Brown) disturb a would-be burglar breaking into Margery's house in Kent. Margery attacks the burglar with a heavy glass vase, and knocks him unconscious. Believing that she has killed him, she panics and flees the house with Gladys, leaving behind her handbag. In Gladys's car, the two women decide to try to reach Margery's son Graham in Milton Keynes, hoping he will give them shelter and money, but the trip turns into a comedy of disasters.

They are forced to break into a pharmacy to obtain insulin for Gladys's diabetes, 'do a runner' from a petrol station and dodge police cameras on the M25. Margery is devastated to learn of a twenty-year affair between her late husband and Gladys, and that her son knew of it. His father also secretly bought a boat and planned to sail away with a childhood friend. With the police, led by about-to-retire Detective Inspector Woolley (Roger Lloyd-Pack) on their trail, the two women drive to Fleetwood, only to meet the childhood friend. The boat, it seems, was purchased with stolen money. After a night on the town at nearby Blackpool, the two women take the boat and sail off to the Caribbean.

== Cast ==
- Penelope Keith as Margery Heywood
- June Brown as Gladys Gladwell
- Roger Lloyd Pack as D.I. Wooley
- Martin Freeman as D.S. Stringer
- Alan David as Gordon Thompson
- Marcia Warren as Jean Thompson
- Adam Godley as Graham Heywood
- Peter Vaughan as Troy Gladwell
- Ken Morley as Bill Nightingale
- Kulvinder Ghir as Mr. Singh
- Ivana Basic as Nina Kovacs
- Richard Ridings as Terry Mason
- Matthew Lockwood as Scott Wilkins
- Tilly Vosburgh as Mrs. Wilkins
- Dickie Speake as Ukulele Player
- Members of the George Formby Society
