= Killer Net =

1998 British crime drama TV series

- Genre: Crime drama Thriller
- Created by: Lynda La Plante
- Written by: Lynda La Plante
- Directed by: Geoffrey Sax
- Starring: Tam Williams; Paul Bettany; Emily Woof; Kathy Brolly; Mark Tandy
- Country of origin: United Kingdom
- Original language: English
- No. of seasons: 1
- No. of episodes: 4 (list of episodes)

Production
- Executive producers: Steve Lanning; Liz Thorburn
- Producer: Lynda La Plante
- Production locations: Brighton, East Sussex, England, United Kingdom
- Running time: 50 mins. (w/out advertisements)
- Production company: La Plante Films

Original release
- Network: Channel 4
- Release: 5 May – 26 May 1998

Killer Net is a British television crime drama mini series, first broadcast on Channel 4 in May 1998. The drama was written and produced by Lynda La Plante, directed by Geoffrey Sax and featured a cast of up and coming actors. One of the main selling points of the series was that it starred Jason Orange of Take That, but it was also one of the introductions to the small screen of Paul Bettany.

== Plot ==
The series is set around the lives of three students living in Brighton, whose contribution to an internet-based computer game leads them right into the heart of an investigation into a serial killer.

== Cast ==
- Tam Williams as Scott Miller
- Paul Bettany as Joe Hunter
- Emily Woof as Suzie Scott
- Zoe Lucker as Carol Butler
- Jason Orange as Brent Moyer
- Sara Stephens as Tracy Wilson
- Kathy Brolly as Charlotte 'Charlie' Thorpe
- Mark Tandy as Robin Butler-Cooke
- Simon Meacock as Tony 'Scruffy' O'Reilly
- Christopher Neame as DCI Collingwood
- Richard McCabe as DI George Colby
- Stephen Boxer as DS Hawkes
- Raquel Cassidy as WPC Pamela Boxer
- Mark Barton Hill as Jamie
- Mark Denham as Jarvis

== Production ==
=== Locations ===
Location filming for Killer Net was completed throughout the late summer of 1997. Many scenes were filmed in Brighton, East Sussex. Scenes set on the actual game "Killer Net" were all filmed in Islington, in and around the Camden Passage antique area. The university that the students attend is not Brighton University, but it is in fact the University of Surrey in Guildford.

Up until the end of the 1990s, Eastern Terrace in Kemp Town, Brighton was used as student lodgings. and number eight was used as the property where the students live. It has since been converted back into accommodation and is one of the most expensive properties in Brighton.

The club featured in the programme is The Zap club in the Kings Road Arches, Brighton. The Casino is actually the Holiday Inn opposite the West Pier on Kings Road and later doubles as the block of flats in which Brent Moyer (Jason Orange) lives. The road in which the police question Scott about his car is Princess Street, Brighton, outside the Marlborough Pub. There are various invaluable scenes filmed inside the West Pier pavilion. The Palace Pier has many scenes filmed on it. When the students go out celebrating after winning the game, the MG is pictured turning from Marine Parade into the Old Steine. The opening shot from Scott's window is a view down Marine Parade and shows the forecourt of the Bristol Bar in Paston Place.

== Episodes ==
No.	Title	Directed by	Written by	Original release date	UK viewers (millions)
1	"Episode 1"	Geoffrey Sax	Lynda La Plante	5 May 1998	TBA
Psychology student Scott Miller meets fellow student Charlie through an internet chat room, and instantly becomes obsessed with her.
2	"Episode 2"	Geoffrey Sax	Lynda La Plante	12 May 1998	TBA
Scott returns to his classes, determined to catch up on the work he has missed, when the CD-ROM for Killer Net arrives.
3	"Episode 3"	Geoffrey Sax	Lynda La Plante	19 May 1998	TBA
DCI Collingwood informs Scott that the dead body that has been found has been identified as Charlie.
4	"Episode 4"	Geoffrey Sax	Lynda La Plante	26 May 1998	TBA
Scott is remanded in custody, while DCI Collingwood interviews fellow students who were at the club on the night that Charlie was killed.

When Killer Net originally aired in Australia on the Nine Network It was edited down and presented as a 90-minute movie.
