= Time After Time (British TV series) =

Television series

- Genre: Sitcom
- Written by: Paul Minett and Brian Leveson.
- Starring: Brian Conley; Samantha Beckinsale; Kate Williams; Richard Graham
- Country of origin: United Kingdom
- Original language: English
- No. of series: 2
- No. of episodes: 14 + 1 pilot

Production
- Producer: David Askey
- Running time: 30 minutes
- Production company: LWT

Original release
- Network: ITV
- Release: 3 July 1993 – 19 May 1995

Time After Time is a British television sitcom that aired between 1993 and 1995 on ITV. After an initial pilot episode aired on 3 July 1993 it was followed by two full series of seven episodes broadcast between 18 March 1994 and 19 May 1995. At the 1994 British Comedy Awards it won the award as the best ITV sitcom.

== Synopsis ==
Career criminal Kenny Conway is released from prison and falls in love with Gillian Walcott, his probation officer. He decides to try and go straight, to the shock of his mother and Donna, his long-term girlfriend.

The series was originally titled Outside Chance for its pilot episode, becoming Time After Time upon its debut as a series in 1994.

== Main cast ==
- Brian Conley as Kenny Conway
- Samantha Beckinsale as Gillian Walcott
- Kate Williams as Ma Conway
- Richard Graham as Jake Brewer
- Georgia Allen as Donna Strachan
- David Shane as Robbie Conway
- Neil McCaul as Mr. Tredwell
- Deddie Davies as Auntie Dot
- Matthew Scurfield as Sergeant Dawes
- Robert Putt as Vinny Conway

== Bibliography ==
- Perry, Christopher . The British Television Pilot Episodes Research Guide 1936-2015. 2015.
