= Martin Thornton =

British theologian (1915–1986)

Martin Thornton (11 November 1915 – 22 June 1986) was an English Anglican priest, spiritual director, author and lecturer on ascetical theology. His "theology of the remnant" has been influential in Anglican circles.

He was active for much of his life in the Diocese of Truro, England, serving 10 years as the canon chancellor of Truro Cathedral. He died on 22 June 1986 and was buried at the Townsend Cemetery, Crewkerne, South Somerset District, Somerset, England. The epitaph on his tombstone is "The word of God his Rule / The Glory of God his Aim / And to God the Holy Trinity / was all his guiding."

== Published works ==
- Rural Synthesis: The Religious Basis of Rural Culture (1948)
- Pastoral Theology: A Reorientation (1956); new edition The Heart of the Parish: Theology of the Remnant (posthumous, 1989)
- Christian Proficiency (1959)
- Essays in Pastoral Reconstruction (1960)
- Margery Kempe: An Example in the English Pastoral Tradition (1960)
- The Purple Headed Mountain (1963)
- English Spirituality: An Outline of Ascetical Theology according to the English Pastoral Tradition (1963)
- The Rock and the River: An Encounter between Traditional Spirituality and Modern Thought (1965)
- The Function of Theology (1968)
- Prayer: A New Encounter (1972)
- My God: A Reappraisal of Normal Religious Experience (1974)
- Spiritual Direction (1982)
- A Joyful Heart: Meditations for Lent (posthumous, 1988)
