= Second Thoughts (TV series) =

British comedy TV series (1991–94)

- Genre: Sitcom
- Created by: Jan Etherington; Gavin Petrie
- Starring: Lynda Bellingham; James Bolam; Mark Denham; Belinda Lang; Julia Sawalha
- Country of origin: United Kingdom
- Original language: English
- No. of series: 5
- No. of episodes: 49

Production
- Running time: 30 minutes (including commercials)
- Production company: LWT

Original release
- Network: ITV
- Release: 3 May 1991 – 14 October 1994

Related
- Faith in the Future

Second Thoughts is a British comedy television programme that ran from 3 May 1991 to 14 October 1994. It was broadcast on the ITV network and made by the ITV company LWT. It was followed by a sequel, Faith in the Future. Second Thoughts followed the lives of two middle-aged divorcees, Bill MacGregor and Faith Greyshott, from very different backgrounds trying to develop a relationship, despite the pressures pulling it apart (namely Faith's two teenage children and Bill's devious ex-wife Liza, who works alongside him).

Second Thoughts was based upon the real-life relationship of the writers, husband and wife Gavin Petrie and Jan Etherington. It originally aired as a radio series on BBC Radio 4 broadcast between 1 November 1988 and 23 July 1992. The radio series consisted of four series and a Christmas special broadcast in 1992, with a total of 31 episodes. The radio scripts were used for the television series on ITV. The fifth series was the only series not to be based on the original radio scripts.

During the recording of an episode of series four, Lynda Bellingham was surprised by the This Is Your Life host Michael Aspel on set as she was to be the star of an episode of This is Your Life. Her co-star James Bolam was in on the surprise, and Lynda appeared truly shocked when Michael Aspel appeared on the set to present her with the big red book and to tell her "this is your life!" to the thundering applause of the studio audience.

Second Thoughts ended on 14 October 1994, but has since been repeated on Forces TV and Rewind TV. The original radio series was often replayed on BBC7, and continues to be repeated on BBC7's rebranded replacement, BBC Radio 4 Extra.

== Characters ==
- Bill MacGregor (James Bolam) – An art editor of a style magazine where he works alongside his ex-wife Liza.
- Faith Greyshott (Lynda Bellingham) – Faith is a freelance illustrator who occasionally does work for the style magazine Bill works for. She has two teenagers from her previous marriage, Hannah and Joe. The children and the dog often come before Bill.
- Liza MacGregor (sometimes known as Liza Ferrari) (Belinda Lang) – Bill's glamorous ex-wife, Liza is a histrionic woman with expensive tastes. Liza works for the same magazine as Bill and is constantly interfering with Bill and Faith's relationship.
- Hannah Greyshott (Julia Sawalha) – Faith's teenage daughter and eldest child.
- Joe Greyshott (Mark Denham) – Faith's teenage son. Joe is obsessed with football and only shows interest in girls when they like football.
- Hilary (Louisa Rix in series 1; Paddy Navin in series 2 and 3) – Faith's best friend who is unlucky in love.
- Richard (Geoffrey Whitehead) – Bill's boss at the magazine. Richard is married to Marjorie, but has an affair with Liza.
- Marjorie (Georgina Melville)
- Callum (Ian Henderson) – Bill's cousin.
- Defor the Dog (Levi)
- Gina (Nadia Sawalha)

== Episode guide ==
=== Series overview ===
Series	Episodes	Originally released	
Series	Episodes	First released	Last released
1	7	3 May 1991	14 June 1991
2	12	3 January 1992	20 March 1992
3	15	18 October 1992	12 February 1993
4	7	29 October 1993	17 December 1993
5	8	26 August 1994	14 October 1994

=== Series 1 (1991) ===
No.	Title	Original release date
1	"Found and Lost"	3 May 1991
Faith introduces Bill to her children as they prepare to move in together.
2	"Match of the Day"	10 May 1991
Faith attempts to get Bill to get to know the children better.
3	"Night Moves"	17 May 1991
Bill and Faith attempt to spend a first night of passion under Faith's roof.
4	"She Who Hesitates"	24 May 1991
Bill wants Faith to be spontaneous but comes to regret it.
5	"Nursing a Conscience"	31 May 1991
When Bill is taken ill, he learns that Faith's bedside manner leaves a lot to be desired.
6	"The Late, Late Show"	7 June 1991
Bill is taught a lesson about family life when Faith expects him to play the heavy stepfather.
7	"A Marriage of Inconvenience"	14 June 1991
Bill and Faith decide to take the plunge and marry forthwith. But they'll find that such impulsive decisions often have repercussions.

=== Series 2 (1992) ===
No.	Title	Original release date
8	"Rebel without a Pause"	3 January 1992
Hannah wants to learn to drive so it falls upon Faith to teach her.
9	"Overtaken by Events"	10 January 1992
Faith thinks Joe should learn about contraception.
10	"Health and Efficiency"	17 January 1992
With Faith away at a health farm, Bill decides on some home improvements.
11	"The Rhythm of Strife"	24 January 1992
Bill cuts all his ties with his bachelor lifestyle when he decides to sell his flat to Liza.
12	"Maybe, Baby?"	31 January 1992
With Hannah and Joe growing up, Faith is getting broody.
13	"Love and Hisses"	7 February 1992
Richard offers Bill the opportunity to launch Vista magazine in America.
14	"Room with a Queue"	14 February 1992
Hannah is leaving for university and everyone has their sight set on her room - including the dog.
15	"Foreign Exchange"	21 February 1992
Bill and Faith take in an Italian foreign exchange student, Gina (Nadia Sawalha) to stay in Hannah's room.
16	"Recipe for Disaster"	28 February 1992
Faith is looking forward to having some friends over to dinner.
17	"Affair Assessment"	6 March 1992
Bill has been working late to cover up for the adulterous Richard and it is beginning to affect his home life with Faith.
18	"Come as You Were"	13 March 1992
The Office Party gives everyone a chance to meet. Meanwhile, Liza finds a new man.
19	"Love, Honour and Delay"	20 March 1992
Bill and Faith attempt to marry again.

=== Series 3 (1992–1993) ===
No.	Title	Original release date
20	"Sleeping Partner"	18 October 1992
Faith is shocked to find that Hannah has been sleeping with her boyfriend.
21	"Youth and Consequences"	25 October 1992
Faith has to face facts—midlife crises don't just happen to other people.
22	"Vice Principle"	1 November 1992
Faith's working life is disrupted when Bill decides to work from home.
23	"Double Booked"	8 November 1992
Faith and Bill mark the anniversary of them becoming lovers.
24	"Is Everybody Happy?"	15 November 1992
Faith does her best to repair Richard & Marjorie's relationship but what about the deteriorating relationship between Bill and Joe?
25	"Occupational Hazard"	22 November 1992
With Joe and Hannah leaving home, Faith looks forward to be home alone with Bill. But Bill has other ideas.
26	"Hello, Goodbye!"	29 November 1992
Bill returns from Germany, with high hopes for a romantic weekend.
27	"Labour of Love"	6 December 1992
Bill struggles to come to terms with redundancy. Meanwhile, Faith has a new job.
28	"Short Change"	13 December 1992
Faith and Bill decide to downsize but Hannah and Joe have other ideas.
29	"Sobering Thoughts"	8 January 1993
Bill starts his new job working under Liza and Faith starts a temperance drive.
30	"Old Problem?!"	15 January 1993
Bill is keeping quiet about his birthday and Joe keeps quiet about his new job.
31	"Heartburn"	22 January 1993
Bill visits the doctor with stomach pains and is told it's all down to stress.
32	"Faint Possibility?!"	29 January 1993
Faith is concerned when Hannah faints at work.
33	"Otherwise Engaged?!"	5 February 1993
Joe has a clash of engagements when Gina visits from Italy.
34	"Management Decision"	12 February 1993
Bill and Faith's relationship is already strained when Bill is sent away on a weekend training course with Liza.

=== Series 4 (1993) ===
No.	Title	Original release date
35	"Last Words"	29 October 1993
Faith is upset, assuming Bill and Liza have been having an affair. Meanwhile, Bill is suffering from alcoholic's remorse.
36	"Into the Fire"	5 November 1993
Bill and Faith part ways, and the bachelor life beckons for Bill as he moves in with Richard above the wine bar.
37	"One More Time"	12 November 1993
Bill and Faith are back together—under new terms; Faith wishes to be romanced, and in return she'll impress him with her "domestic skills" whether he likes it or not.
38	"Auld Acquaintance"	19 November 1993
Bill and Faith head for Scotland to let Bill rediscover his roots.
39	"Mr. Fixit"	3 December 1993
Faith and Bill decide on an extension, but their builder thinks he's full of good advice about everything.
40	"Whose Birthday is it Anyway?"	10 December 1993
Faith is planning a family lunch for Joe's birthday, but Joe and everybody else have other plans.
41	"Playing Away"	17 December 1993
Hannah starts an affair with Richard's new piano player who just happens to be married.

=== Series 5 (1994) ===
No.	Title	Original release date
42	"What's New?"	26 August 1994
Liza announces she is pregnant - but who is the father? Joe now hates his job and stops going in, but his spirits are revived when Gina returns.
43	"Work Experience"	2 September 1994
Liza resigns as editor of 'Vista' magazine - or was she sacked? Bill is temporarily appointed in her place.
44	"She's Leaving Home!"	9 September 1994
When Joe is arrested at a football match, Faith throws him out.
45	"Mortal Thoughts"	16 September 1994
Bill attempts to persuade Faith to make a will but she believes it's tempting fate.
46	"Dress Circle"	23 September 1994
Faith is too ill to attend an important dinner with Bill in his role as acting editor of Vista, so who can he take instead?
47	"Sporting Chance"	30 September 1994
Bill is advised to take up golf in order to impress the board of Vista, so Faith volunteers to coach him.
48	"Full House"	7 October 1994
Faith's goddaughter is getting married, she and Bill are invited as is Faith's ex-husband whom she has invited to stay.
49	"Friday the 13th"	14 October 1994
Bill learns the Vista board's decision. Faith and Liza finally meet and end up in hospital together.

== Radio series ==
Second Thoughts
- Genre: Sitcom
- Running time: 30 minutes
- Country of origin: United Kingdom
- Home station: BBC Radio 4
- Starring: Lynda Bellingham; James Bolam; Belinda Lang
- Created by: Jan Etherington; Gavin Petrie
- Written by: Jan Etherington; Gavin Petrie
- Original release: 1 November 1988 – 23 July 1992
- No. of series: 4
- No. of episodes: 31

Second Thoughts original started as a Radio series on BBC radio 4, between 1988 and 1991, before moving onto TV series.

=== Episode guide ===
- 1st series: 3 November-22 December 1988
- 2nd Series: 31 October-19 December 1989
- 3rd Series: 9 April-28 May 1991
- 4th Series: 18 June-23 July 1992

Xmas special 25 December 1992 ('The Fight Before Christmas').

== DVD releases ==
All five series of Second Thoughts have been released on DVD. The first series was released in June 2005, but there was a six-year gap before the second series was released on 11 July 2011. (During the gap, Network DVD was busy sorting out and planning release schedules on other TV shows.) The third series was released just under four months later on 7 November 2011, followed by the fourth series on 16 January 2012, and the fifth and final series on 5 March 2012, with a complete series set consisting of all five series together that followed.

DVD	Release date
The Complete Series 1	6 June 2005
The Complete Series 2	11 July 2011
The Complete Series 3	7 November 2011
The Complete Series 4	16 January 2012
The Complete Series 5	5 March 2012
The Complete Series 1 to 5 Box Set	8 December 2014
