= A Gentleman's Club =

- Genre: Sitcom
- Written by: Richard Gordon
- Directed by: Sydney Lotterby
- Starring: William Gaunt; Richard Vernon
- Theme music composer: Max Harris
- Country of origin: United Kingdom
- Original language: English
- No. of series: 1
- No. of episodes: 6

Production
- Producer: Sydney Lotterby
- Running time: 30 minutes
- Production company: BBC

Original release
- Network: BBC2
- Release: 23 September – 28 October 1988

A Gentleman's Club is a British television sitcom broadcast in the UK on BBC2 between 23 September and 28 October 1988.

Set in the fictional Albany Club in London, the series dealt with the changes afoot when the club was forced to move with the times and admit women.

== Cast ==
- Aubrey - William Gaunt
- George - Richard Vernon
- Brindles - Michael Ripper
- Hubert - John Gill
- Ann – Jill Meager
- Willie – Christopher Benjamin
- Toby - Gareth Armstrong
- Jim – Tim Barker
- Lord Cotswold – Jerome Willis
- Quentin – Rupert Frazer

== Episodes ==
Episode #	Title	Original airdate
1	"The New Boy"	23 September 1988
2	"The Actor"	30 September 1988
3	"A Question of Er..."	7 October 1988
4	"The Perfect Match"	14 October 1988
5	"Visiting Time"	21 October 1988
6	"Memorial Service"	28 October 1988
