= Mark Denham =

British actor

Mark Denham (born 1975) is a British actor, best known for his role as Joe Greyshott in the sitcom Second Thoughts. Denham later appeared in one episode of the show’s sequel, Faith in the Future. Denham had a role in the third episode of Killer Net and appeared in The Full Monteverdi.

He was trained at the Royal Academy of Dramatic Art, graduating in 1997.
