= Next of Kin (TV series) =

British sitcom 1995–1997

- Genre: Sitcom
- Created by: Jan Etherington; Gavin Petrie
- Starring: Penelope Keith; William Gaunt; Ann Gosling; Matthew Clarke; Jamie Lucraft
- Country of origin: United Kingdom
- Original language: English
- No. of series: 3
- No. of episodes: 22

Production
- Running time: 30 minutes

Original release
- Network: BBC1
- Release: 15 May 1995 – 20 February 1997

Next of Kin is a British sitcom that aired on BBC1 from 15 May 1995 to 20 February 1997. It starred Penelope Keith in her last regular sitcom role. The plot follows well-to-do couple Maggie and Andrew Prentice who are forced to abandon their dreams of early retirement after they reluctantly become guardians of their orphaned grandchildren, after the death of their estranged son. It was written by Gavin Petrie and Jan Etherington.

It was announced in The Mirror newspaper in April 1997 that Next of Kin had been axed by the BBC and that Penelope Keith was furious.

== Plot ==
Self-absorbed middle-class couple Maggie and Andrew Prentice have just taken early retirement and intend to spend their final years luxuriating in their new home overlooking a vineyard in the south of France. However, when their estranged son Graham and his wife (they only refer to her as 'Boot-face') die in a car crash, Maggie and Andrew are forced to become legal guardians and later adoptive parents of Graham's three children, thirteen-year-old Georgia, eleven-year-old Philip and seven-year-old Jake, meaning that they will never be able to go to France. In the first series, Maggie and Andrew officially adopted the children. Maggie especially hates this as she doesn't like children, and the children blatantly resent her and Andrew for the way they treated their parents. To make matters worse the children are argumentative and fussy. Georgia is a vegetarian environmentalist, Philip only eats spam and Jake won't eat anything round.

During the series, the family struggle to get along together, with Andrew and Maggie missing their former privileged life, and the children unwilling to give their grandparents a chance initially. Maggie and Andrew also began to feel considerable remorse for the appalling way they treated their late son, Graham, and they gradually grow to love and care deeply for their grandchildren, particularly in the final episode of the series, when Philip is being bullied and Maggie and Andrew encounter the bully's parents, who greatly remind them of themselves: negligent, selfish and more interested in having a good time than being a loving, attentive parent to their child.

The Prentices also employ a cleaner, Liz, who lives her life based on horoscopes and daytime talk shows such as The Oprah Winfrey Show. Over the course of the series, Liz develops a relationship with Tom, a builder, who arrives to install a damp course in the kitchen and then is employed to do further jobs, including converting the garage into another bedroom for one of the children. Tom is a serial womanizer with various one night stands turning up throughout series 2 much to Liz's frustration. Both Liz and Tom only appear in series 1 and 2. It is revealed in series 3 that they left together after Liz became pregnant.

Also making regular appearances are Rosie and Hugh Buckingham, Maggie and Andrew's best friends. Snobbish and child-free, they regularly turn their noses up at things such as pets, camping, and vacuuming whilst regaling Maggie and Andrew with their tales of their latest holiday, trip to the gym, or game of golf, depressing them with tales of the life they used to enjoy.

During series 2 and 3 Philip acquires a new friend and girlfriend in Roxanne. Loud, scruffy, and outspoken, she owns a very large rottweiler dog named Die Hard.

== Characters ==
Maggie Prentice (Penelope Keith) Maggie was dreaming of moving to France, drinking fine wines and eating good food. She declares that moving to France will be an opportunity to end all ties with Graham. She readily admits that she did not particularly like her son Graham, nor his wife, but upon hearing news of his death, she hates herself for not being a better mother to him. She dislikes children and doesn't want to have to take in her grandchildren. Throughout the series she is shown to be more compassionate and grows to enjoy having the children around.

Andrew Prentice (William Gaunt) Andrew shares Maggie's idea that moving to France will be a chance to cut Graham from their lives, but when Graham dies, Andrew is more relaxed about having the children come to live with them, as it gives him a chance to be the good father he never was to Graham. He too was looking forward to early retirement in France, but he realises rather quickly that he has no choice but to look after his grandchildren. He does however show reluctance to make certain sacrifices such as selling his vintage car (Volvo P1800 ES Sports-back), his wine cellar laden with some of France's finest and his weekly game of golf.

Georgia Prentice (Ann Gosling) (Born 1982) Georgia is a sullen and self-righteous 13-year-old vegetarian environmentalist. She resents having to live with her grandparents and is determined to make things as difficult for them as possible, especially Maggie. She repeatedly feels isolated in being the only girl and believes she is not as likeable as her brothers. During the series she deals with an eating disorder which brings her slightly closer to Maggie.

Philip Prentice (Matthew Clarke) Philip is 11. (Born 1984) He struggles to cope with the death of his parents and becomes increasingly difficult, although not as much as Georgia. He will not eat anything other than spam. During the course of the series he develops an interest in the drums as well as girls. He is seen to be bullied in the last episode during which in the final scene he gives Maggie a Mothers' Day card, giving the impression that he has accepted Maggie and Andrew as his adoptive parents.

Jake Prentice (Jamie Lucraft) Jake is seven years old. (Born 1988) He has a keen interest in all animals from goldfish, stick insects, hamsters and rabbits. He seems less affected by his parents' deaths than Georgia and Philip: this is mainly due to his age.

Liz (Tracie Bennett) Liz is the Prentices' cleaner. She has an unpleasant daughter, Laura, and lives her every day through horoscopes, advice pages and daytime television. During the series she becomes involved with Tom, who has a string of ex lovers calling and bumping into him. Liz, unhappy and fearful that he will not be faithful becomes reluctant to stay involved with him. In series 2 when her violent ex-husband Jack gives her two black eyes, Tom goes to 'sort him out', only to end up in hospital himself. Liz then sees him as a hero and someone who can protect her. Liz does not appear in series 3.

Tom (Mark Powley) Tom is a builder. He arrives at the house to install a damp course. Both Georgia and Liz immediately have a crush on him. He is then employed to convert the garage into a fourth bedroom and from then on becomes more involved with Liz. By the second series, the relationship develops further with Tom hitting Liz's ex-husband after he beats her up. Tom does not appear in series 3.

During episode one of series 3, when Roxanne mistakes Rosie for the new cleaner, she mentions that "the last one got pregnant and ran off with the builder".

Rosie and Hugh Buckingham (Wanda Ventham) and (Timothy Carlton) Hugh and his idle, pampered wife Rosie are Maggie and Andrew's oldest and best friends. They are a wealthy, childfree couple who regularly went to the gym, played golf and went on holiday with Maggie and Andrew, but after the children arrive, Maggie and Andrew can no longer do this. Rosie and Hugh depress Maggie and Andrew with their stories of luxurious holidays, massages, parties and rounds of golf, making them long for their old life back.

Roxanne (Diana Magness) Roxanne is an outspoken, slightly scruffy school friend and then girlfriend of Philip's. The Prentices are somewhat intimidated by her and her dog Die Hard.

Ant (Jeremy Swift) Ant is a social worker. He first appears in the first series when Philip is taken to hospital with a head injury after pretending to be a human cannonball. The hospital think he has been mistreated and Ant is appointed to take on the case. He makes semi-regular appearances, coming back to oversee the adoption process and even directing Jake's school's nativity play. It is revealed in series 2 that his wife has left him for a woman named Ruby. He does not appear in series 3 and is not mentioned.

Jelly is a dog, bought by the children as a birthday present for Maggie in series 2. She only appears in this episode as she is re-homed when it emerges that Philip suffers from an allergy when Jelly is near him. Although Maggie did not like or want Jelly at first, she bonds with the puppy but when Phillip becomes ill, and they discover that he is allergic to her, Maggie and the family are saddened to let her go.

Graham Prentice (Unseen character) (1962–1995) Graham is Maggie and Andrew's estranged son. Maggie and Andrew never wanted to be parents, and thus their relationship with Graham was not a loving one. Maggie admits that Graham especially resented her. He and his unnamed wife (referred to as 'Boot-face') vehemently badmouthed Maggie and Andrew to Georgia, Philip and Jake, and the children often recall the horrible things Graham endured at his parents' hands, such as being abandoned at boarding school whilst Andrew and Maggie enjoyed themselves abroad. Despite not bonding with Graham, upon hearing news of his death, Maggie was furious at herself for not trying to be a better mother to him.

== Cast ==
- Penelope Keith – Maggie Prentice
- William Gaunt – Andrew Prentice
- Ann Gosling – Georgia Prentice
- Matthew Clarke – Philip Prentice
- Jamie Lucraft – Jake Prentice
- Tracie Bennett – Liz (Series 1&2)
- Mark Powley – Tom (Series 1&2)
- Wanda Ventham – Rosie
- Timothy Carlton – Hugh
- Diana Magness – Roxanne (Series 2&3)
- Jeremy Swift – Ant (Series 1&2)

== Location ==
The series was mostly filmed on location in Cheltenham, Gloucestershire. The Prentice household was on Tivoli Road while the school was St James' Primary School in Cheltenham. Episode 7 of Series Two "The Theme Park" features scenes filmed at Chessington World of Adventures in Surrey part of the Royal Borough of Kingston upon Thames.

== Theme Tune ==
The theme music was a reworked version of the song Tea for Two. It was sung by the cast.

- Penelope Keith "Tea For Two and Two For Tea"
- William Gaunt "Me For You and You For Me"
- Both Together "Can't You See How Happy We Would Be?"
- Children Together "You Could Raise a Family"
- Matthew Clarke and Jamie Lucraft "A Boy Like Us"
- Ann Gosling "A Girl Like Me"
- Cast "Can't You See How Happy We Could Be?"

== Episodes ==
=== Series One (1995) ===
- "Accidental Death" (15 May 1995) Maggie and Andrew's hopes for retirement in France are dashed when their grandchildren come to live with them after their parents are killed in a car crash.
- "Harry" (22 May 1995) The first day with the Kids Phillip ends up in A and E due a game of "Cannon" going wrong then they are forced to engage with Ant the social worker and Jake's Hamster dies also
- "Enjoyment" (29 May 1995) Andrew takes the kids out to entertain them, only to get himself arrested.
- "Expansion" (5 June 1995) It's decided to build an extension to give the children their own bedrooms, prompting Andrew to make a tearful goodbye to his garage wine collection and his classic sports car .
- "The New Term" (12 June 1995) Maggie's looking forward to some time to herself now the children are going back to school, but chicken-pox intervenes.
- "Adoption" (19 June 1995) Maggie and Andrew are to become the children's legal guardians.

=== Christmas Special (1995) ===
- "The Nativity Play" (21 December 1995) It's the school Christmas play, but Andrew is getting seduced by a younger grandmother and Maggie gets stopped by the police for suspected driving under the influence .

=== Series Two (1996) ===
- "Georgia's Party" (2 January 1996) After reading Georgia's diary, Maggie believes she has forgot her birthday, prompting her to hold a belated one.
- "Pollution" (9 January 1996) Maggie becomes concerned about a new teacher at the kids' school.
- "The Puppy" (16 January 1996) Maggie is horrified to receive a puppy on her birthday.
- "The Sports Day" (23 January 1996) Jake's sports day ends with someone winning first place.
- "Camping" (30 January 1996) The only holiday Maggie and Andrew can afford is under canvas, along with everyone else.
- "The Anniversary" (6 February 1996) To celebrate their wedding anniversary, Maggie and Andrew host a barbecue.
- "The Theme Park" (13 February 1996) Maggie accidentally wins tickets to a theme park. Her reluctance to go soon changes.

=== Series Three (1997) ===
- "The Flu" (2 January 1997) Maggie comes down with the 'flu, leaving Andrew in charge.
- "Embarrassment" (9 January 1997) After receiving a lecture on acceptable behaviour following embarrassing their grandchildren in public, Maggie and Andrew up the ante.
- "She's Leaving Home" (16 January 1997) Maggie decides to leave home after feeling superfluous to requirements.
- "The Cub Mistress" (23 January 1997) Maggie becomes a leader at the local cub scout group.
- "The Narrowboat" (30 January 1997) The Prentices take a narrow-boat holiday, but mutiny is in the air.
- "The Fast" (6 February 1997) Georgia is fasting for world peace, but could her protest be more deep-rooted?
- "Neighbours" (13 February 1997) The snobbish next door neighbour Mrs Henshaw (Anne Reid) is moving out due to the increase in noise and activity since the children moved in.
- "The Bully" (20 February 1997) Philip is being bullied. And while sorting the issue, it forces Andrew and Maggie to look at themselves and as a result, the family become much closer as in the closing of the series, Philip presents Maggie with a Mother's Day card and thus the bridge of family reconciliation is in progress

== DVD releases ==
The complete entire series was released by the BBC on DVD in Australia on 10 June 2015 and by Simply Media in the UK on 25 April 2016. It appeared that early DVD releases had audio issues on some episodes, these have been corrected on newer releases.
