= Townsend Cemetery, Crewkerne =

Cemetery in Somerset County, England

Townsend Cemetery
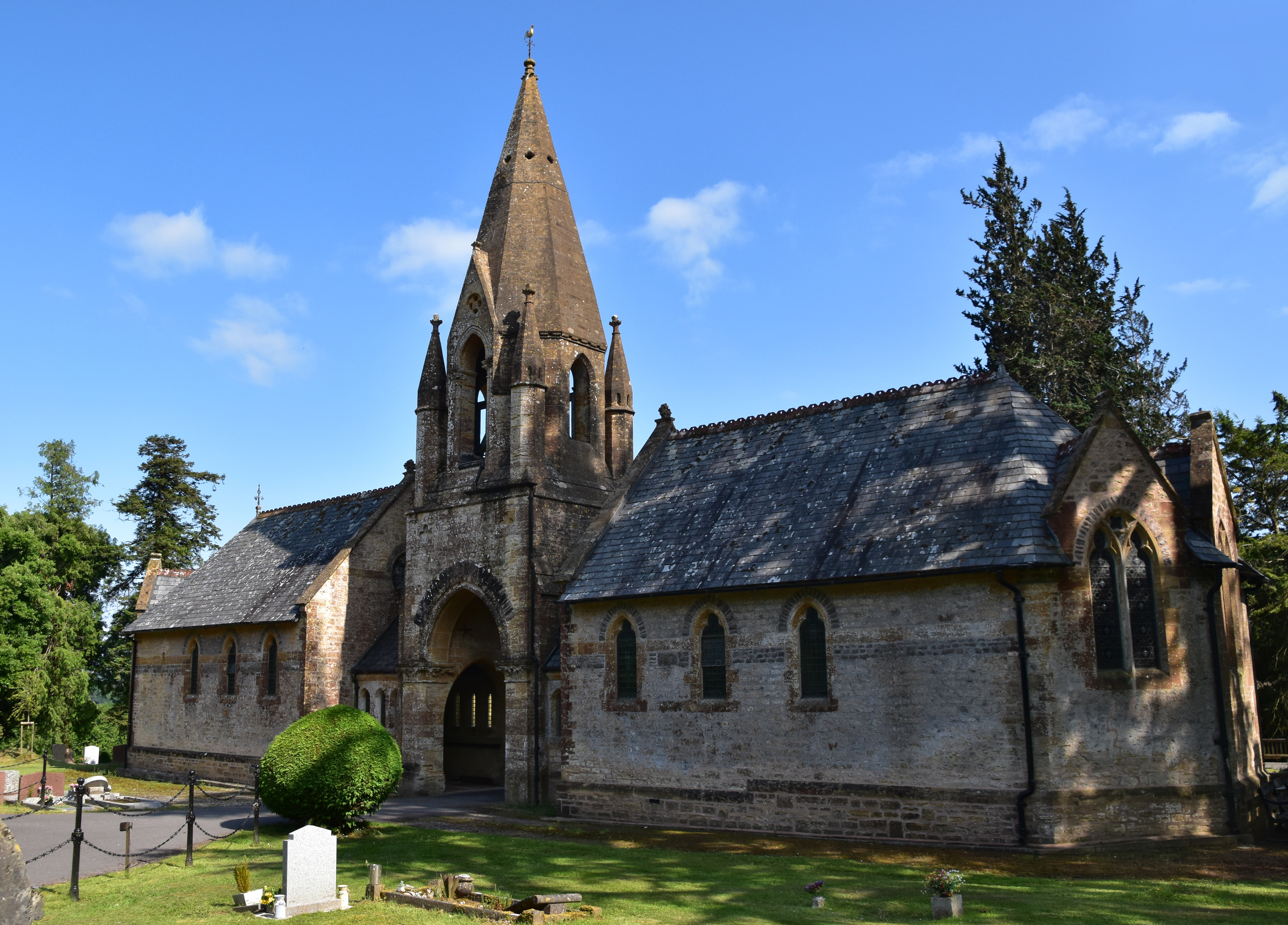

Details
- Established: 1874
- Location: Mount Pleasant, Crewkerne
- Country: UK
- Coordinates: 50.8868°N 2.7837°W
- Type: Cemetery
- Owned by: Crewkerne Town Council

Townsend Cemetery is a cemetery in Crewkerne, Somerset, England. It is owned by Crewkerne Town Council, and jointly run by the Town Council and West Crewkerne Parish Council.

The cemetery's lodge, two mortuary chapels, entrance gates, gate piers, walls and railings all became Grade II listed buildings and structures in 1993.

== History ==
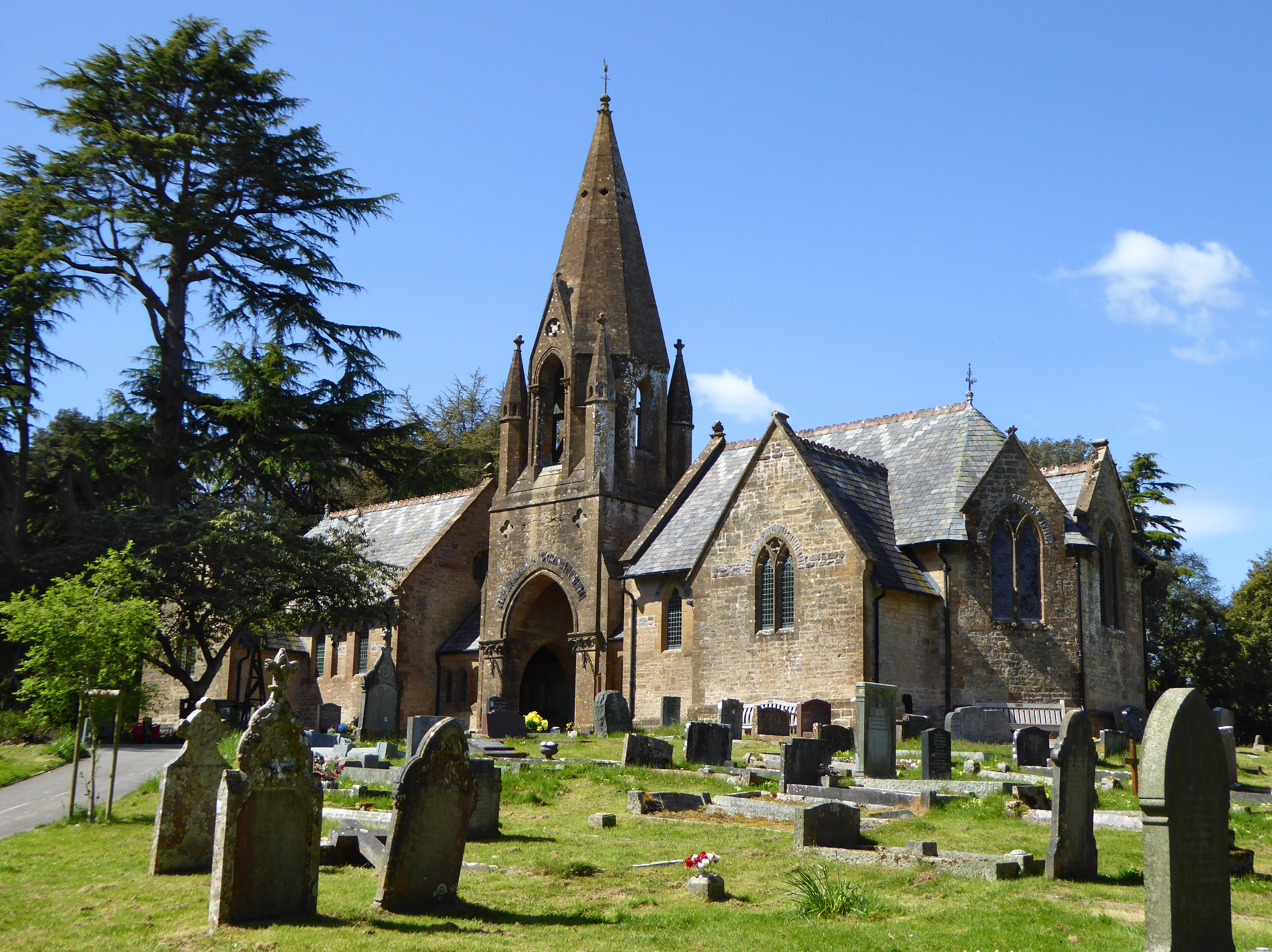
Townsend Cemetery and its two mortuary chapels.

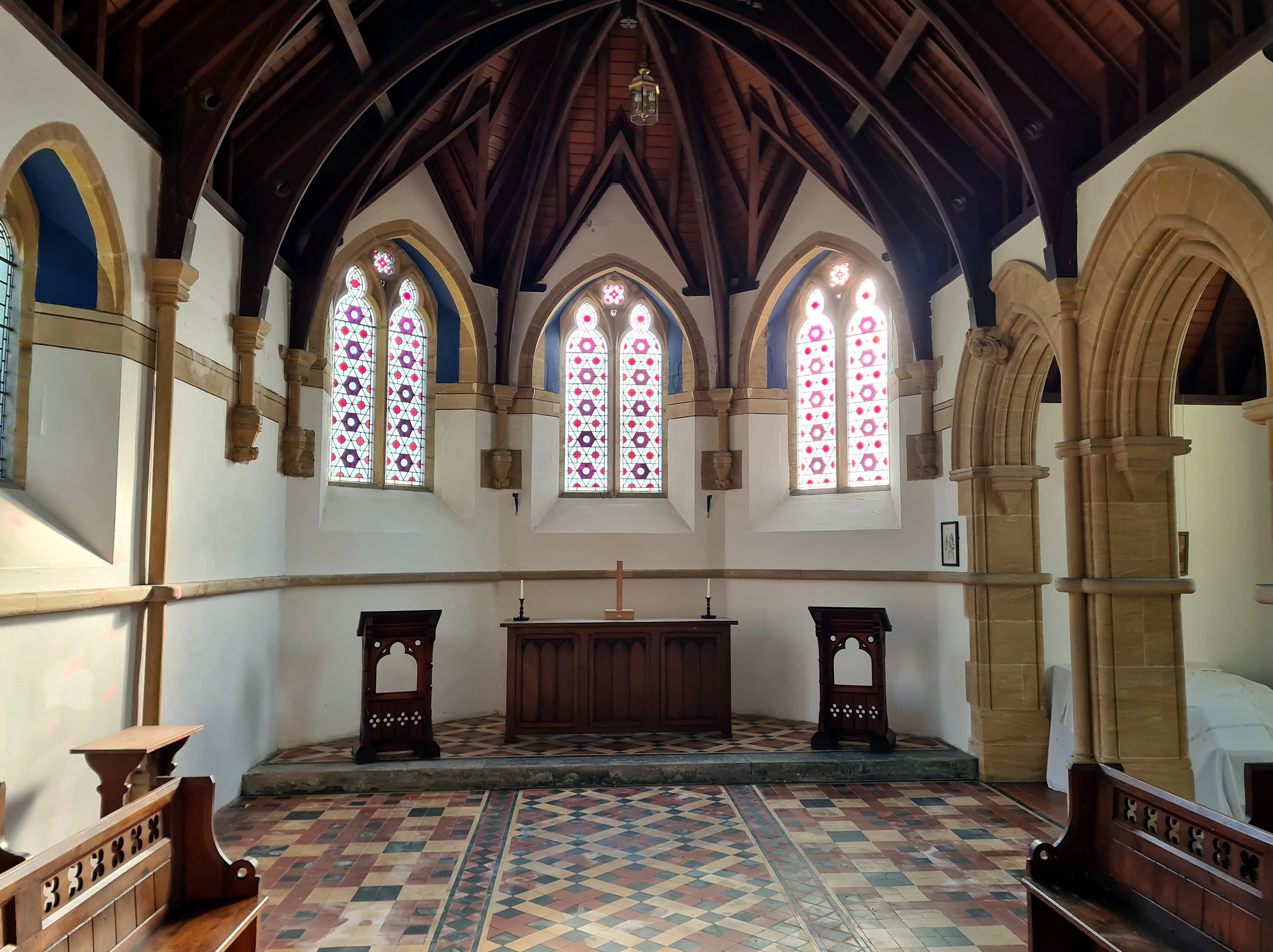
The interior of the Church of England mortuary chapel.

Townsend Cemetery was established in 1873–74, at a time when the burial spaces in the churchyards of St Bartholomew and Christ Church were reaching close to capacity. In March 1872, a vestry meeting was held to consider the creation of a cemetery and the appointment of a Burial Board. Both schemes were approved and the Burial Board was elected during the meeting, made up of Messrs. Cuff, Poole, Sparks, Horsey, Bird, Wills, Jolliffe, Hussey and Stembridge.

A number of different sites around Crewkerne were considered for the new cemetery, including a field of around 8 acres (3.2 ha) known as "Ten Acres" to the north-east of the town centre, which belonged to J. B. Phelps of Clapton Court. "Ten Acres" was voted as the preferred site during a vestry meeting of August 1872. A memorial was received by the Burial Board in September 1872 from inhabitants of Clapton, Hewish, Woolminstone and other hamlets on the west side of Crewkerne, requesting the cemetery be located on that side of the town, but it did not alter the Board's decision.

In November 1872, a vestry meeting sanctioned the Burial Board to raise the required £3,000 for the cemetery through a loan. The cost included £1,250 for purchase of the site, £250 for the construction of boundary walls and fences, £225 for a lodge house, £1,000 for two chapels and £200 for laying out the grounds.

By July 1873, £1,500 had been borrowed and the land had been successfully purchased. The Board had also approved plans by the nurseryman and landscape gardener Mr. J. Scott of Merriott for the layout of the grounds, as well as his tender to carry out the work for £150. With over 30 submissions received for the design of the chapels and lodge, those of the London architect George Nattriss were selected, along with the tender of Richard Draper of Crewkerne to build them for £1,452.

A vestry meeting of July 1873 saw an additional £500 approved towards the cemetery's cost, owing to alterations to the original plans. This included adding a waiting room, office and strong room to the lodge and making some alterations to the chapels. The Board's £3,500 loan was to be repaid over the course of 50 years.

Work on the cemetery began around August 1873 and continued into late 1874. The cemetery was 4 acres (1.6 ha) in size, with 2.5 acres (1.0 ha) being apportioned to the Church of England and 1.5 acres (0.61 ha) to Nonconformists. While the cemetery itself was four acres, the Board purchased the entire field (leaving the remainder in reserve) as Mr. Phelps would not divide it.

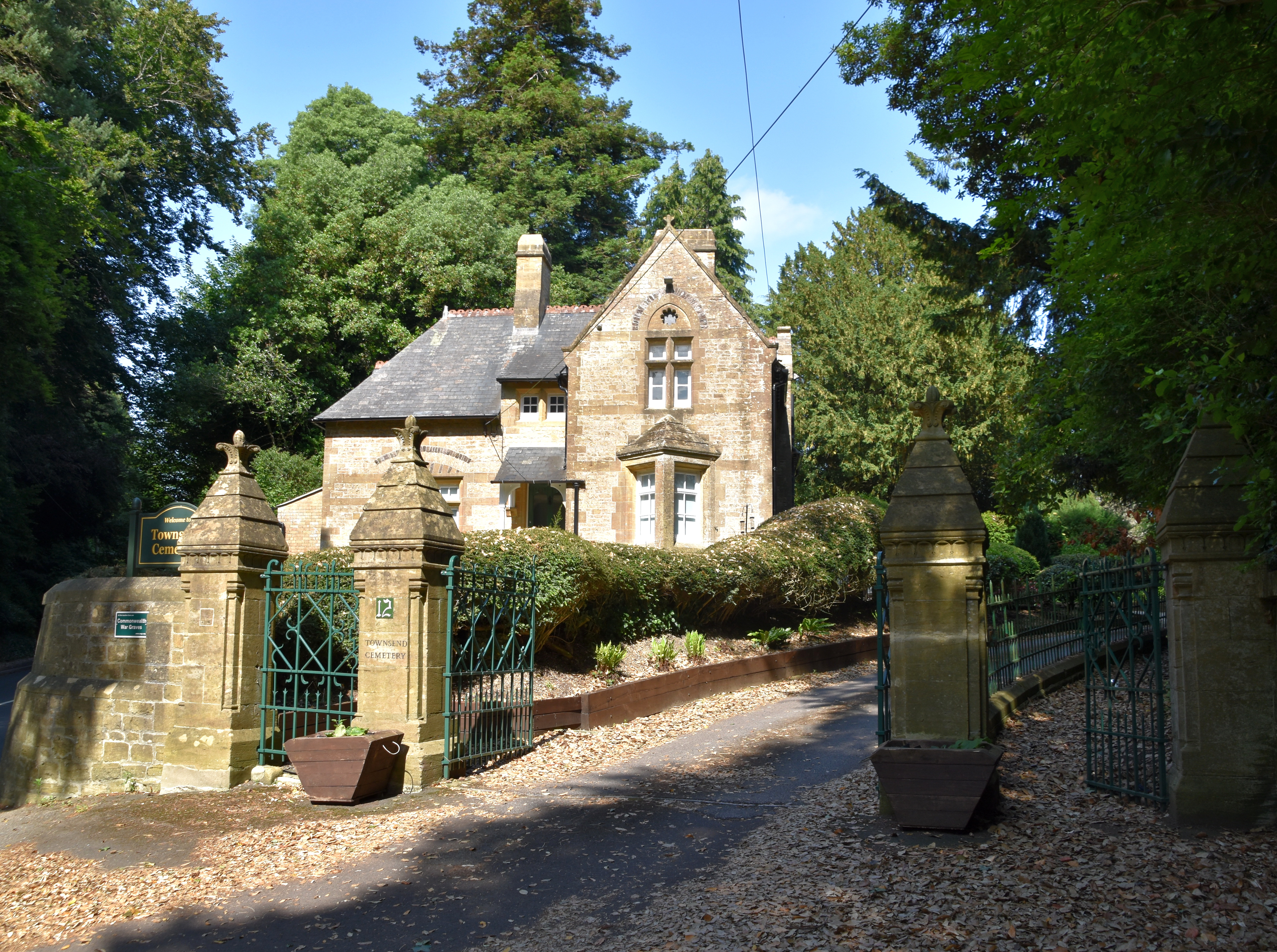
The cemetery entrance and lodge.

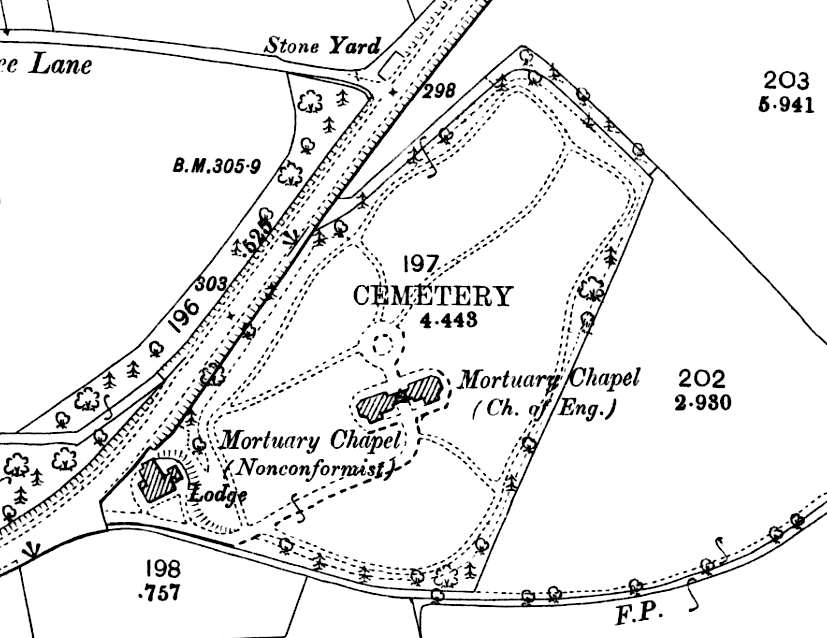
Townsend Cemetery depicted on an Ordnance Survey map from 1903.

Over 2,000 trees and shrubs were planted in the grounds, which were made up of around 500 different varieties. Two chapels were built, one for the Church of England and one for Nonconformists. Both are connected by a central arch which supports a square bell tower and octagonal spire of Hamstone. The two-storey lodge was built at the cemetery's entrance and contained the cemetery keeper's apartment, a waiting room, board room, clerk's office and strong room. The chapels and lodge were built using local stone, with Hamstone dressings.

The cemetery opened in 1874 and the Bishop of Bath and Wells, Arthur Hervey, consecrated the Church of England section, including its chapel, on 3 November 1874.

== Burials ==
The main section of the cemetery contains approximately 6,800 burials. A new section was opened in 1990 and contained a further 600 burials as of 2018. The Commonwealth War Graves Commission identifies nineteen casualties within the cemetery.

=== Notable burials ===
- Martin Thornton, English Anglican priest, spiritual director, author and lecturer, 1986.
- Lynda Bellingham, English actress, broadcaster and author, 2014.
