= Duck Patrol =

1998 British comedy TV series

- Genre: Comedy
- Created by: Jan Etherington; Gavin Petrie
- Starring: Richard Wilson
- Theme music composer: Simon Wallace
- Country of origin: United Kingdom
- Original language: English
- No. of series: 1
- No. of episodes: 7

Production
- Executive producer: Humphrey Barclay
- Producer: Jamie Rix
- Running time: 25 minutes
- Production company: LWT

Original release
- Network: ITV
- Release: 19 July – 30 August 1998

Duck Patrol is a British television comedy series that originally aired between 19 July and 30 August 1998. Produced by LWT for the ITV network, it centred on a river police station by the River Thames.

The script for the pilot episode "Of Ducks and Men" was re-filmed with some changes to supporting cast and main cast uniforms, and retitled as "Flying Colours", which then became the first episode of the broadcast series. The series consisted of seven episodes: Flying Colours, Out to Grass, Occurrences, The Spirit of the Deep, Duck Turpin, River Rage and The Siege of Mallory Wharf.

== Cast ==
- Richard Wilson as PC Roland "Prof" Rose
- David Tennant as Simon "Darwin" Brown
- Samantha Beckinsale as Gillian "Marilyn" Monroe
- Trevor Cooper as James "Ollie" Oliver
- Geoffrey Hutchings as Malcolm "Sarge" White
- Jason Watkins as Kevin "Taz" Delaney
- Craig Fairbrass as Hero
- Sue Johnston as Val Rutland
- John Biggins as Stan Murdoch
- Jan Ravens as Angie Tennant

== Episodes ==
Series	Episodes	Originally released	
Series	Episodes	First released	Last released
1	7	19 July 1998	30 August 1998

=== Series 1 (1998) ===
Filming for this series began in July 1998 and ended in August 1998.

No. overall	No. in season	Title	Directed by	Written by	Original release date
1	1	"Flying Colours"	Sylvie Boden	Jan Etherington and Gavin Petrie	19 July 1998
2	2	"Out to Grass"	Sylvie Boden	Jan Etherington and Gavin Petrie	26 July 1998
3	3	"Occurrences"	Sylvie Boden	Peter Tilbury	2 August 1998
4	4	"The Spirit of the Deep"	Sylvie Boden	Peter Tinniswood	9 August 1998
5	5	"Duck Turpin"	Sylvie Boden	Jan Etherington and Gavin Petrie	16 August 1998
6	6	"River Rage"	Sylvie Boden	Jan Etherington and Gavin Petrie	23 August 1998
7	7	"The Siege of Mallory Wharf"	Sylvie Boden	Peter Spence	30 August 1998
