= Julia Sawalha =

British actress (born 1968)

- Sawalha in 2009
- Born: 9 September 1968 (age 58); Wandsworth, London, England
- Education: Italia Conti Academy of Theatre Arts
- Occupation: Actress
- Years active: 1981–present
- Notable work: Press Gang; Absolutely Fabulous
- Parent: Nadim Sawalha (father)
- Relatives: Nadia Sawalha (sister); Nabil Sawalha (uncle)

Julia Sawalha (/səˈwəlxə/; born 9 September 1968) is an English actress. She is best known for playing Saffron "Saffy" Monsoon in the BBC sitcom Absolutely Fabulous (1992–2012) and its 2016 film. Her other television roles include Lynda Day in Press Gang (1989–1993), Hannah Greyshott in Second Thoughts (1991–1994) and its sequel series, Faith in the Future (1995–1998), Mercy Pecksniff in the television miniseries of Martin Chuzzlewit (1994), Lydia Bennet in the BBC adaptation of Jane Austen's Pride and Prejudice (1995), Carla Borrego in Jonathan Creek (2001–2004), Jessie Brown the BBC miniseries Cranford (2007) and Dorcas Lane in the BBC's costume drama Lark Rise to Candleford (2008–2011). Her film credits include Buddy's Song (1991), In the Bleak Midwinter (1995), The Wind in the Willows (1996) and Chicken Run (2000).

== Early life and education ==
Sawalha was born in Wandsworth, London, on 9 September 1968, and is the daughter of Roberta Lane and actor Nadim Sawalha. Her sister Nadia is an actress and television personality. Her father was born in Madaba, Jordan. She was named after her paternal grandmother, a businesswoman who had received an award from Queen Noor for enterprise. She is of Jordanian, English and French Huguenot ancestry.

Sawalha was educated at the Theatre Arts School, a fee-paying independent school which is part of the Italia Conti Academy of Theatre Arts, based at the time in Clapham in south London, which she left at the age of fifteen.

== Career ==
Sawalha made her debut in the 1982 BBC miniseries Fame Is the Spur, and in 1988 played a small role in Inspector Morse, on the episode "Last Seen Wearing".

She first gained attention for her starring role in the BAFTA award-winning ITV teenage comedy-drama Press Gang, which ran from 1989 to 1993.

From 1991 to 1994, she starred in the ITV family comedy Second Thoughts and continued with her character, Hannah (Lynda Bellingham's daughter), in the British Comedy Award-winning Faith in the Future (1995–1998).

From 1992 to 2012, Sawalha played strait-laced daughter Saffron "Saffy" Monsoon in the BBC sitcom Absolutely Fabulous, alongside Jennifer Saunders and Joanna Lumley.

Also in 1992, she appeared in episode "Parade" (S2 E4) of Bottom as Veronica Head, a beautiful young barmaid at the Lamb and Flag, whom Richie tries to woo by boasting falsely of his adventures in the Falklands. In 1994, she played Mercy (Merry) Pecksniff in the BBC production of Martin Chuzzlewit. She appeared in the 1995 BBC adaptation of Jane Austen's Pride and Prejudice as Lydia Bennet, with Jennifer Ehle and Colin Firth.

From 1999 to 2000, she voiced Mouse in the HIT Entertainment/Grand Slamm Children's Films/CITV TV series Kipper. She voiced lead character Ginger in DreamWorks/Aardman Animations' Chicken Run (2000). From 2000 to 2001, she voiced Georgina and provided Kid's vocal effects in the HIT Entertainment/Grand Slamm Children's Films/CBBC TV series Sheeep.

In 2000, she appeared as Janet the Australian barmaid in the first series of the sitcom Time Gentlemen Please.

In 2001, she became Alan Davies's co-star in Jonathan Creek after Caroline Quentin left, appearing in a Christmas Special ("Satan's Chimney"). She returned for a series between 2003 and 2004.

She also played the much put-upon PA to "Zak" in Argos TV adverts during 2002–2004, along with Richard E. Grant.

She joined actor Ioan Gruffudd in the TV adaptations of C. S. Forester's Horatio Hornblower novels, as the captain's wife Maria in two movies in 2003.

In 2006, she participated in the third series of the genealogy documentary series Who Do You Think You Are? tracing her family's roots, which are Jordanian Bedouin on her father's side and French Huguenot on her mother's. She also appeared in the pilot of BBC1's A Taste of My Life presented by Nigel Slater.

After a two-year break, she was back on screen in May 2007, competing in the BBC dog training celebrity reality show The Underdog Show. She then returned to acting in two successive BBC costume dramas: as Jessie Brown in 2007 series Cranford, followed by Lark Rise to Candleford from 2008 to 2011. She provided the voice acting for Sister Hannah (also known as "Hammer"), a main character in the 2008 Xbox 360 video game Fable II.

In autumn 2014, Sawalha played the part of Jan Ward in BBC One's thriller miniseries Remember Me. On 9 May 2015, she read the account of a member of the Women's Land Army at VE Day 70: A Party to Remember in Horse Guards Parade, London, which was broadcast live on BBC1. In 2016, she appeared in an episode of Midsomer Murders, and reprised her role as Saffy Monsoon in Absolutely Fabulous: The Movie.

In July 2020, she made a statement revealing Aardman Animations intended to recast her character of Ginger in the upcoming sequel to Chicken Run, stating that she is now considered to sound too old, and commented "I have officially been plucked, stuffed & roasted". The decision was met with widespread criticism with some finding the decision ageist. She even released video clips online, dubbing over her original voice lines to prove her voice still sounded the same.

In January 2024, Sawalha participated in the fifth series of The Masked Singer as the character "Bubble Tea". She was eliminated and unmasked in the fourth episode.

== Personal life ==
On 1 January 2004, tabloid newspapers reported that she had married Alan Davies, with whom she co-starred in the television series Jonathan Creek. Both she and Davies, who avoided discussing their private lives in public, denied this, and took legal action against the reports.

In September 2025, Sawalha signed an open pledge with Film Workers for Palestine pledging not to work with Israeli film institutions "that are implicated in genocide and apartheid against the Palestinian people."

== Filmography ==
=== Film ===
Year	Title	Role	Notes
1991	Buddy's Song	Kelly	Supporting Role
1995	In the Bleak Midwinter	Nina Raymond (Ophelia)	Supporting Role
1996	The Wind in the Willows	The Jailer's Daughter	Supporting Role
2000	Chicken Run	Ginger	Voice
2001	Venus and Mars	Marie	Supporting Role
2001	The Final Curtain	Karen Willet	Supporting Role
2016	Absolutely Fabulous: The Movie	Saffron 'Saffy' Monsoon	Main Role
2023	Chicken Run: Dawn of the Nugget	Ginger (Flashback Scenes)	Voice, Cameo

=== Television ===
Year	Title	Role	Notes
1981	Keep It in the Family	Walk-On	Uncredited; Episode: "A Game of No Chance"
1982	Fame Is the Spur	Amy	Episode: "1.2"
1982	Educating Marmalade	Good Girl	4 episodes
1982	The Pirates of Penzance	Daughter	Uncredited; Television film
1988	Inspector Morse	Rachel	Episode: "Last Seen Wearing"
1989–1993	Press Gang	Lynda Day/Young Katherine Hill	43 episodes RTS Television Award – Best Actor
1990	Spatz	Chloe Fairbanks	Episode: "The Sound of Muzak"
1991	El C.I.D.	Trudy	Episode: "Thursday's Child"
1991	Casualty	Nikki Watson	Episode: "Living in Hope"
1991–1994	Second Thoughts	Hannah Greyshott	47 episodes
1992	Bottom	Veronica Head	Episode: "Parade"
1992–2012	Absolutely Fabulous	Saffron 'Saffy' Monsoon	39 episodes
1993	Parallel 9	Herself	Episode: "Episode 2.5"
1994	Lovejoy	Joanna Whymark	Episode: "Double-Edged Sword"
1994	Keeper	Alison	tv short
1994	Martin Chuzzlewit	Mercy Pecksniff	6 episodes
1995	Pride and Prejudice	Lydia Bennet	6 episodes TV mini-series
1995–1998	Faith in the Future	Hannah Greyshott	22 episodes
1996	French and Saunders	Herself	Episode: "Baywatch"
1996	Tales from the Crypt	Teresa	Episode: "The Kidnapper"
1997	McLibel!	Helen Steel	"Episode 1.1"; TV mini-series
1997	Ain't Misbehavin'	Dolly Nightingale	3 episodes
1997	An Audience with the Spice Girls	Herself	TV special
1998	Absolutely Fabulous: Absolutely Not!	Saffron 'Saffy' Monsoon	video
1998	Light Lunch	Herself	Episode: "The Future's Bright, the Future's Funny"
1999	The Curse of Fatal Death	Emma	Charity spoof TV movie by Comic Relief
1999	The Flint Street Nativity	Wise Man	TV movie
1999	Late Lunch	Herself	Episode: "#2.14"
1999–2000	Kipper	Mouse (voice)	4 episodes
2000	Mirrorball	Freda Keill	TV short
2000	The Hatching of 'Chicken Run'	Herself	TV special
2000	Poultry in Motion: The Making of Chicken Run	Herself	TV special
2000	HBO First Look	Herself	Episode: "The Hatching of Chicken Run"
2000	Stars in Their Eyes	Herself	Episode: "Cerys Matthews"
2000	Bob Martin	Herself	Episode: "Through the Keyhole"
2000	Masterchef	Herself	Episode: "#10.14"
2000	The Nearly Complete and Utter History of Everything	Catherine Parr	TV movie
2000–2001	Time Gentlemen Please	Janet Wilson	21 episodes
2000–2001	Sheeep	Georgina (voice), Kid (various noises), Jaunita Luftfita (voice), Penny (voice), Princess Grazelightly (voice), Additional voices	26 episodes
2001–2004	Jonathan Creek	Carla Borrego	7 episodes
2003	Hornblower	Maria Mason/Hornblower	TV movie
2003–2004	Comedy Connections	Narrator (voice)	14 episodes
2004	White Box	Saffron	TV movie
2004	The Story of Absolutely Fabulous	Herself	TV special
2006	A Taste of My Life	Herself	TV special
2006	Who Do You Think You Are?	Herself	Episode: "Julia Sawalha"
2007	The Underdog Show	Herself	Unknown episodes
2007	The Graham Norton Show	Herself	Episode: "#1.7"
2007	Cranford	Jessie Brown	5 episodes
2008–2011	Lark Rise to Candleford	Dorcas Lane	40 episodes
2009	The Alan Titchmarsh Show	Herself	Episode: "9 March 2009"
2013	Agatha Christie's Marple	Mrs. Cresswell	Episode: "Greenshaw's Folly"
2014	Remember Me	Jan Ward	3 episodes
2016	Midsomer Murders	Penny Henderson	Episode: "Saints and Sinners"
2020	It's Pony	Jill Sneekly (voice)	Unknown episodes
2024	Vera	Helen Rushton	Episode: "Tender"
2024	The Masked Singer UK	Participant	Unmasked as Bubble Tea.
2026	Father Brown	Cynthia Wendle	Guest appearance

=== Video games ===
Year	Title	Role	Notes
2008	Fable II	Hannah/Hammer	Xbox 360 game
2020	World of Warcraft: Shadowlands	Additional voices	Computer game

== Theatre ==
Year	Title	Role	Notes
1985–1986	The Voyage of the Dawn Treader	Lucy	Newcastle Playhouse
1987–1988	Peter Pan	Wendy	Newcastle Opera House
1997	The Illusion	Isabelle	Royal Exchange Theatre
1997	Dearest Daddy...Darling Daughter	Daughter	Young Vic Theatre
1998–1999	The Memory of Water	Catherine	Churchill Theatre

== Awards and nominations ==
Year	Award	Category	Work	Result	Ref.
1993	Royal Television Society Television Awards	Best Actor - Female	Press Gang	Won	
2009	Monte-Carlo Television Festival Golden Nymph	Outstanding Actress - Drama Series	Lark Rise to Candleford	Nominated	
2011	16th National Television Awards	Drama Performance	Lark Rise to Candleford	Nominated	
2012	17th National Television Awards	Drama Performance: Female	Lark Rise to Candleford	Nominated	
