= Mark Powley =

British film and television actor (born 1963)

- Born: 4 October 1963 (age 63); Chelmsford, Essex, England
- Occupation: Actor
- Years active: 1986–present
- Children: Bel Powley
- Relatives: Douglas Booth (son-in-law)

Mark Powley (born 4 October 1963) is a British actor known for his work on television. He appeared in 88 episodes of police drama The Bill as PC Melvin (1987–1990), and as builder Tom in BBC sitcom Next of Kin for two series (1995–1996).

In 2017, Powley shared his memories of The Bill and his career in general in an interview for The Bill Podcast.

His father was a surgeon and his mother was a nurse.

== Career ==
Powley has also made appearances in Birds of a Feather, Casualty, Game On, Hollyoaks, Emmerdale and sitcom Life of Riley.

He also had a role in the 2008 film Bronson opposite Tom Hardy.

In 2020, Powley shared his memories of his early work on The Bill for the book Witness Statements: Making The Bill (Series 1–3). A follow-up volume, Witness Statements: Making The Bill (1988), was published in 2022, also featuring his memories about the earliest half-hour episodes of the programme.

== Filmography ==
Film & television
Year	Title	Role	Notes
2013	The Tunnel	Vernon	TV series
2013	Lewis	Jack Cornish	TV series
2011	Hidden	Mark Venn	TV series
2009	Bronson	Andy Love	Film
2009	Life of Riley		TV series
2008	M.I. High	Linus Millar	1 episode
2008	Doctors		TV series – 2 episodes
2006	Holby City		TV series – 2 episodes
2003	Is Harry on the Boat?		Film
2002–2003	Hollyoaks	Johnno Dean	TV series
2001	Coronation Street	Rob Lucas	soap opera
1997–2013	Casualty	John/Lance Croom/Lance Collins/Jim Taylor	TV series – 9 episodes
1999	Emmerdale	Liam Hammond	soap opera
1999	Wing Commander	Lt. Polanski	Film
1996	Game On	Jason	TV series – 3 episodes
1995–1996	Next of Kin	Tom	TV series – 12 episodes
1987	Bloody New Year	Rick	Film
1987–1990	The Bill	PC Melvin	TV series – 88 episodes
