= William Gaunt =

English actor (born 1937)

- Born: William Charles Anthony Gaunt; 3 April 1937 (age 89); Pudsey, West Riding of Yorkshire, England
- Occupation: Actor
- Years active: 1961–present
- Spouse: Carolyn Lyster (m. 1974)
- Children: 2

William Charles Anthony Gaunt (born 3 April 1937 in Pudsey, West Riding of Yorkshire) is an English actor. He became widely known for television roles such as Richard Barrett in The Champions (1968–1969), Arthur Crabtree in No Place Like Home (1983–87) and Andrew Prentice in Next of Kin (1995–97). He has had many other roles on television and also an extensive stage career as an actor and director, including performances with the Royal Shakespeare Company.

== Early life ==
Gaunt's father was a solicitor. Gaunt attended Giggleswick School and Baylor University, Texas, and then the Royal Academy of Dramatic Art. He then spent three years working in repertory theatre at Worthing, Bath, Salisbury and Cheltenham after which he was in America for another year, later returning to the UK working on productions at Birmingham, Coventry and Cheltenham, interrupted by a spell in the army.

After minor roles in 1960s series such as Z-Cars and The Avengers, and the Edgar Wallace Mysteries films The Sinister Man (1961) and Solo for Sparrow (1962), he gained a role as the super-powered secret agent Richard Barrett in the 1968 British espionage/science fiction series The Champions. In 1966 he appeared in "Flight Plan," an episode of The Saint, where he played an Osprey pilot. He had also appeared in a recurring role of Constable Bob Marriott in Sergeant Cork following policemen in Victorian London. Between 1977 and 1978 he appeared in 22 of the 26-episode television series "The Foundation" in the role of Gareth Brown.

== Later career ==
Between 1983 and 1987, Gaunt starred as harassed father Arthur Crabtree in the sitcom No Place Like Home. He subsequently made many guest appearances in other series such as Juliet Bravo and in the Doctor Who two-part serial Revelation of the Daleks (1985). From 1995 to 1997, Gaunt starred in the sitcom Next of Kin opposite Penelope Keith. In 2010, he appeared in the Globe Theatre production of Shakespeare's Henry IV, Part 1. He starred in the 2004 Doctor Who audio series Dalek Empire III. He also appeared in the Channel 4 series Cast Offs. In December 2002 he appeared in an episode of Heartbeat (Series 12 episode 11), we played Charles Robertson in an episode titled Sins Of The Fathers.

In December 2011, Gaunt was seen in Episode One of the ITV drama Without You. In February 2012, Gaunt appeared in Midsomer Murders as Ludo DeQuetteville in the episode "The Dark Rider", first aired on ITV1 on Wednesday 1 February 2012. This is his second appearance in this series, after playing Michael Bannerman in the 2004 episode "The Maid in Splendour". In May 2015, Gaunt played Judge St John Redmond in six episodes of EastEnders.

The TV channel Talking Pictures started showing Sergeant Cork in 2025, with Gaunt appearing before each episode to give a short chat about the episode's production.

== Stage roles ==
Gaunt also has extensive stage experience, both as an actor and a theatre director, including a notable success in playing the Micheál Mac Liammóir character in Gates of Gold by Frank McGuinness at the Finborough Theatre, London, and in the West End. He was the originating director of Here's A Funny Thing when it was first staged at the Liverpool Playhouse.

Gaunt appeared in the Royal Shakespeare Company production of The Seagull, sharing the role of Sorin with Ian McKellen; and appeared in King Lear as Gloucester at the New London Theatre in Drury Lane, London, opposite McKellen in the title role following a United Kingdom tour. He revived his performance as Gloucester in the TV film of the same name released in late 2008. He appeared in the role of Dogsborough, a parody of Paul von Hindenburg in Bertold Brecht's The Resistible Rise of Arturo Ui, and in The Crucible at the Old Vic. In 2017 he appeared in a tour of Alan Bennett's play The Lady in the Van. In 2021, he appeared as Duncan in The Tragedy of Macbeth at the Almeida Theatre.

In 2025, Gaunt appeared in The Truth About the Blayds at the Finborough Theatre as 90 year old family patriarch Blayds.

== Personal life ==
Gaunt married actress Carolyn Lyster on 7 September 1974. They have a daughter, Matilda, and a son, Albie.

== Partial filmography ==
| Year | Title | Role | Notes |
|---|---|---|---|
| 1961 | The Sinister Man | Mitch Hallam | Film |
| 1962 | Armchair Theatre | Romeo | Episode: "Afternoon of a Nymph" |
| 1962 | The Avengers | Sub-Lieutenant Ken Graham | Episode: "Traitor in Zebra" |
| 1962 | Ghost Squad | Voyce | Episode: "The Grand Duchess" |
| 1962 | Solo for Sparrow | Det. Sergeant Reeve | Film |
| 1962 - 1970 | Z-Cars | D.C. Maycock/ Alfie Smith/ Mills | 6 episodes |
| 1963 - 1968 | Sergeant Cork | Bob Marriott | 64 episodes |
| 1965 | The Wednesday Play | Peter | Episode: "Wear a Very Big Hat" |
| 1966 | The Saint | Flight Lieutenant Mike Gregory | Episode: "Flight Plan" |
| 1967 | Softly, Softly | Tupper | Episode: "What Colour a Wolf?" |
| 1968 - 1969 | The Champions | Richard Barrett | 30 episodes |
| 1968 - 1969 | The Tenant of Wildfell Hall | Mr. Lawrance | 4 episodes |
| 1971 | Paul Temple | Peerie Elliot | Episode: "Critics, Yes! But This is Ridiculous!" |
| 1975 | Wodehouse Playhose | Dr. Joe Mulliner | Episode: "Portrait of a Displinarian" |
| 1976 | Nobody's House | Peter | 7 episodes |
| 1976 | Sutherland's Law | Charlie Morton | Episode: "The Eye of the Chameleon" |
| 1977 - 1978 | The Foundation | Gareth Brown | 22 episodes |
| 1980 | The Enigma Files | Mike | Episode: "The Gunpowder Plot" |
| 1981 | Play for Today | Patrick Witney | Episode: "No Visible Scar" |
| 1982 | The Agatha Christie Hour | Major John Winbraham | Episode: "The Case of the Discontented Soldier" |
| 1983 | Juliet Bravo | Chief Supt. Tomkins | Episode: "Retribution" |
| 1983 - 1987 | No Place Like Home | Arthur Crabtree | 43 episodes |
| 1985 | Doctor Who | Orcini | 2 episodes (Serial: "Revelation of the Daleks") |
| 1986 | The Practice | Howard Raintree | 4 episodes |
| 1988 | A Gentleman's Club | Aubrey | 6 episodes |
| 1989 | Capstick's Law | Edward Capstick | 6 episodes |
| 1991 | About Face | Mr. Sheridan | Episode: "Sleeping Sickness" |
| 1991 | G.B.H. | Hunningdon | Episode: "It Couldn't Happen Here?" |
| 1995 - 1997 | Next of Kin | Andrew Prentice | 22 episodes |
| 2002 | Heartbeat | Charles Robertson | Episode: "Sins of the Fathers" |
| 2002 | The Vice | Chivers | Episode: "No Man's Land" (TV mini-series) |
| 2004 - 2012 | Midsomer Murders | Michael Bannerman/ Ludo DeQuetteville | 2 episodes |
| 2005 | Holby City | Terry Nelson | Episode: "Dignity" |
| 2005 - 2016 | Doctors | Stan Robinson/ Kester Hall/ Bill Lindstrom/ Phillip Lester/ Tommy Thomas | 5 episodes |
| 2008 | King Lear | Duke of Gloucester | TV movie |
| 2009 | Cast Offs | Graham | Episode: "Tom" |
| 2011 | Casualty | Malc Stroud | Episode: "A Pound of Flesh" |
| 2011 | Life of Riley | David | Episode: "The Girlfriend" |
| 2011 | Without You | Paul Manning | 1 episode |
| 2012 | Run for Your Wife | Man on Bus | Film |
| 2015 | EastEnders | Judge St. John Redmond | 4 episodes |
| 2015 | The Timber | Jebediah | Film |
