= Samantha Beckinsale =

British actress (born 1966)

- Born: Samantha-Jane Beckinsale; 23 July 1966 (age 60); Nottingham, England
- Occupation: Actress
- Years active: 1986–present
- Parents: Richard Beckinsale (father); Margaret Bradley (mother)
- Relatives: Kate Beckinsale (half-sister); Judy Loe (stepmother)

Samantha-Jane Beckinsale (born 23 July 1966)is a British actress. She played firefighter Kate Stevens in London's Burning.

== Early life ==
Beckinsale is the only daughter of actor Richard Beckinsale and his first wife, Margaret (née Bradley). They divorced when Beckinsale was a young child and she did not see her father for years. Samantha was unaware that her father was Richard Beckinsale until she was 11, the same year he married actress Judy Loe. Beckinsale and her father reconnected and spent time together, before his death in 1979. She is half-sister of Kate Beckinsale, her father's daughter with Loe. She studied drama at Clarendon College, Nottingham.

== Television ==
In 1990, Beckinsale was chosen by LWT to play firefighter Kate Stevens in ITV's drama series London's Burning, which ran from 1986 to 2002. In 1989, Beckinsale guest starred as WPC Martin in an episode of Thames Television's Never the Twain. Shortly after this, she was given the role of Lesley in the final three series of Thames Television's Shelley. In 1994, she was chosen by LWT to play the role of Gillian in the sitcom Time After Time which lasted two series.

In 1997, Beckinsale starred as Jilly Howell in the short-lived sitcom Get Well Soon and in 1998 she was chosen by LWT to play the role of Gillian Monroe in the short-lived sitcom Duck Patrol with Richard Wilson.

== Personal life ==
In 2022, Beckinsale came forward as a survivor of domestic abuse. She is a patron of the Broxtowe Women's Project, which offers support for women suffering from domestic abuse. She wrote and produced a docudrama titled Love? which deals with coercive control in relationships.

== Television and film roles ==
Year	Title	Role
1989	Agatha Christie's Poirot - "The Adventure of Johnnie Waverly"	Barmaid
1989, 1992	Shelley - "Day of the Reptile" and "The Deep End"	Secretary (one episode) Lesley (one episode)
1989	Screen Two - "Ice Dance"	Cindy
1989	Never the Twain - "Neighbours"	WPC Martin
1990 to 1992	London's Burning	Firefighter Kate Stevens
1992	The Upper Hand - "Sex, Lies, and Exercise Tape"	Vicky
1993, 2005	Heartbeat - "Manhunt" and "Services Rendered"	Susan Robinson (one episode) Elsa Jenner (one episode)
1994 to 1995	Time After Time	Gillian
1995	Wales Playhouse - "Archangel Night Out"	Tracey
1995	Jake's Progress	Blue Eyes
1995	The Imaginatively Titled Punt & Dennis Show	
1995	The World of Lee Evans	Girl
1996	Bugs	Pascal
1996	Coronation Street	Lorraine Mason
1997	Get Well Soon	Jilly Howell
1998	Duck Patrol	Gillian Marilyn Monroe
1999	Nancherrow	Nesta Carew
1999	Dangerfield	DS Katie Webb
2000	The Blind Date	Patty
2000	The Scarlet Pimpernel - "A Good Name"	Nana
2001	Where the Heart Is - "Faith"	Ros Callaghan
2001	McCready and Daughter - "The Dating Game"	Lesley Graham
2001	Out of the Ashes	Sarah
2002	Murder in Mind	Christine
2003	Magic Grandad - "Famous People 2: Boudica"	Boudica
2004	Lighthouse Hill	Sally
2004	Doctors - "The Miracle"	Susan Marshall
2000 2004 to 2005	Holby City "Taking It on the Chin" "Braver Soul Than I" "A Sense of Guilt" "Moment of Truth" "A Good Day to Bury Bad News" "Elf and Happiness" "Overload" "War and Peace"	Maggie Haney (one episode) Maggie Thornton (seven episodes)
2005	Marian, Again	Josie Bevan
2006	The Penalty King	Maddie Vaughan
2014	Katherine of Alexandria	Vita
2022	Love?	Woman
