= Lynda Bellingham =

English actress, broadcaster, and author (1948–2014)

Lynda Bellingham OBE
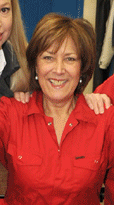
- Bellingham, c. 2010
- Born: Meredith Lee Hughes; 31 May 1948; Montreal, Quebec, Canada
- Died: 19 October 2014 (aged 66); Westminster, London, England
- Resting place: Townsend Cemetery, Crewkerne, Crewkerne, Somerset, England
- Education: Royal Central School of Speech and Drama
- Occupations: Broadcaster, actress, author
- Years active: 1971–2014
- Notable work: Loose Women
- Spouses: Greg Smith (m. 1975; div. 1976); Nunzio Peluzo (m. 1981; div. 1996); Michael Pattemore (m. 2008)
- Children: 2

Lynda Bellingham (/ˈbɛlɪŋəm/ BEL-in-gəm; 31 May 1948 – 19 October 2014) was an English actress, broadcaster and author. She acted in television series such as All Creatures Great and Small, Doctor Who, Second Thoughts and Faith in the Future. She was also known for her appearances as the mother in the long-running series of "Oxo Family" British TV advertisements between 1983 and 1999, and as a panellist on the ITV lunchtime chat show Loose Women between 2007 and 2011.

== Early life ==
Bellingham was born Meredith Lee Hughes in Montreal to a single mother, but was given up for adoption because she was born out of wedlock in a strict church-going family. She was adopted when she was four months old by an English couple, Donald and Ruth Bellingham, who renamed her Lynda. Bellingham was educated at Aylesbury High School, and trained at the Central School of Speech and Drama.

== Film and television ==
=== Acting ===
Bellingham's first television role was an appearance in The Misfit when she was 21. She played a nurse in the 1970s ATV afternoon soap opera General Hospital. Her early film credits included roles in Confessions of a Driving Instructor (1976), Stand Up, Virgin Soldiers (1977) and Riding High (1981) with Eddie Kidd. She also appeared in the comedy short The Waterloo Bridge Handicap (1978) with Leonard Rossiter. Prior to her brief role as Janice Wyatt in Sweeney! (1977), the first big-screen adaptation of the TV police drama series The Sweeney, she had appeared in the Sweeney episode "Trojan Bus" (1975) in which she played Nancy King, accomplice to two Australian robbers. In 1981, she appeared in the ITV comedy-drama Funny Man set in the music hall of the late 1920s.

Her other roles included Helen Herriot in the James Herriot drama All Creatures Great and Small taking over from Carol Drinkwater, the 1980 Andrea Newman drama series Mackenzie, Blake's 7 (1981), and the situation comedy Second Thoughts, along with its sequel Faith in the Future. With her Oxo Family co-star, Michael Redfern she appeared in an episode of Filthy Rich and Catflap.

Bellingham appeared as the Inquisitor in the 14-part Doctor Who serial The Trial of a Time Lord in 1986. She reprised the character for the Big Finish Productions audio series Gallifrey, and in the Big Finish Productions audio drama Trial of the Valeyard, (which she recorded only a few months before announcing her cancer). She starred as Emily Marlowe in the film The Scarlet Tunic in 1998, and appeared in Gleb Panfilov's The Romanovs: A Crowned Family as Empress Alexandra the following year. She was in Waking the Dead A Simple Sacrifice (2001) parts one and two playing Mary Mantel.

From 2000 to 2003, Bellingham played Pauline Farnell, the compassionate accountant in At Home with the Braithwaites with Amanda Redman and former All Creatures Great and Small colleague Peter Davison. She had a recurring role in The Bill as villainess Irene Radford for several months in 2004, and appeared as Marlene in Devil's Gate the same year. She also appeared in Midsomer Murders "The Fisher King" as Jane Willows. She had a role in the ITV comedy Bonkers playing Mrs Wadlow, a man-eating suburban housewife who seduces her neighbour's teenage son and turns him into her gigolo. Later that year, she filmed guest appearances in episodes of Love Soup and Robin Hood. She played DCI Karen Hardwick in a 2007 episode of New Tricks (S4:E1).

=== Television commercials ===
Bellingham played the central character in the long-running "Oxo Family" series of TV commercials, starting in 1983, playing a mother who binds her family together by cooking them meals featuring Oxo products. The advertisements typically featured the family sitting down to a meal at which Oxo gravy would be served. Throughout the 1980s and 1990s, the family was seen to grow older. When the campaign was retired in 1999, the family moved out of the house.

=== Television presenting ===
On 17 December 2010, Bellingham guest-presented the ITV programme Lorraine.

In 2012, she presented her own cookery series called My Tasty Travels with Lynda Bellingham. The following year, she presented the ITV programme Country House Sunday.

=== Loose Women ===
Bellingham joined Loose Women on 10 April 2007, appearing alongside Carol McGiffin and Coleen Nolan, and continued as a regular on the show until 2011. In all, Bellingham made more than 300 appearances on the show, including a special appearance in 2014 shortly before her death. Two editions of Loose Women were dedicated to Bellingham after her death.

=== Strictly Come Dancing ===
In 2009, Bellingham was one of the contestants in the seventh series of Strictly Come Dancing, where she was partnered with Darren Bennett. She was voted out by the judges in the fourth week.

Week #	Dance/Song	Judges' scores					Result
Week #	Dance/Song	Craig Revel Horwood	Alesha Dixon	Len Goodman	Bruno Tonioli	Total	Result
1	Tango / "Under Pressure"	3	6	7	5	21	Safe
2	Cha-Cha-Cha / "Don't Go Breaking My Heart"	5	6	6	6	23	Safe
3	Paso Doble / "Devil Woman"	5	7	7	6	25	Bottom Two
4	Foxtrot / "Calendar Girl"	5	7	6	6	24	Eliminated

=== Other appearances ===
In 1993, Bellingham was the subject of This Is Your Life when she was surprised by Michael Aspel on the set of Second Thoughts.

In February 1999, she was part of the Heated Rollers comedy team alongside Gwyneth Strong and Joanna Monro. The Heated Rollers programme was the first all-women sketch show broadcast on BBC Radio 2, and the writers included Lesley Ann Albiston and Caroline Gold.

In 2011, Bellingham featured in a short film entitled Too Close for Comfort, playing the character of a mother to her real-life son, actor and celebrity butler Michael Peluso (from ITV's fly-on-the-wall documentary series The Savoy). Bellingham and Peluso reprised their roles for the follow-up web series of the same name in 2014. Mirroring Bellingham's personal life, her character had developed cancer.

== Live performances ==
Twice in the 1960s, Bellingham appeared in the Pendley Open Air Shakespeare Festival.

In January 2005, she appeared in a play entitled Losing Louis at Hampstead Theatre before transferring to the Trafalgar Studios in London. Her performance received critical acclaim, especially from Michael Billington.

In October 2007, she appeared in the play Vincent River at the Trafalgar Studios in London.

From September 2008 to July 2009, Bellingham played the role of Chris Harper in the stage version of the hit film Calendar Girls on tour and at the Noël Coward Theatre in the West End. She returned to the show for further tours in 2010, 2011 and 2012.

Over the Christmas/New Year period of 2011/12, she played the Fairy Godmother in the pantomime Cinderella at the Birmingham Hippodrome. She played the role again at the Alhambra Theatre, Bradford over the Christmas/New Year period of 2012/13.

Bellingham was due to star in Kay Mellor's play A Passionate Woman at the Sheffield Crucible, followed by a national tour, however, it was announced in July 2013 that the show had to be postponed owing to Bellingham's cancer treatment.

== Writing ==
In 2010, Bellingham launched her book Lost and Found, a story of her life and career and toured the country for private readings. Her novel Tell Me Tomorrow was published in 2013. In 2014, Bellingham's autobiography, There's Something I'm Dying to Tell You, was issued shortly before her death. Her final story, The Boy I Love was published posthumously in November 2014.

== Personal life ==
Bellingham was married three times, first in 1975 to film and theatre producer Greg Smith. According to Bellingham in her 2010 autobiography, the marriage was one driven primarily by sex, with Smith later admitting to numerous affairs with other actresses, including some who sent nude photos to their home.

Her second marriage (1981–1996) was to restaurateur Nunzio Peluso, with whom she had two sons, Michael and Robbie. The couple were introduced to each other at the Italian restaurant La Famiglia in Chelsea, London, in the early 1980s by friend and fellow actor Christopher Biggins. After a whirlwind courtship and romance, the couple married but the relationship was marred by Peluso's jealousy of Bellingham's former lovers leading to a series of altercations, fights and domestic abuse towards her. Around the same time as Bellingham was being abused by Peluso, she was starring in the Oxo adverts and felt bound to hide the truth about her marriage for fear of spoiling her image in the commercials. As Bellingham revealed in her 2010 autobiography Lost & Found: My Story: "maybe if my private life had been happier I would have enjoyed doing it more. As it was, I felt I was living a lie. Being the nation's favourite mum on screen and going home to an abusive relationship was heartbreaking [...] the irony was horrific. Here I was, the Oxo mum, hiding behind closed doors, isolated from her friends and family." The couple divorced in 1996, Bellingham giving her former husband half of everything she owned, although he continued to intimidate her. A restraining order was granted in 2000 to keep Peluso away from his former wife. On 31 May 2008, Bellingham married her boyfriend, Spain-based timeshare salesman, Michael Pattemore (known on Loose Women as "Mr Spain"), at St Stephen Walbrook on her 60th birthday.

Bellingham was appointed Officer of the Order of the British Empire (OBE) in the 2014 New Year Honours for voluntary service to charitable giving.

=== Illness and death ===
On 16 July 2013, it was announced that Bellingham had been diagnosed with colorectal cancer. She released a statement saying she was "not going to die."

In September 2014, Bellingham confirmed that her cancer had metastasised to her lungs and liver and that she had "months to live". She announced that she had made the choice in August 2014 to stop chemotherapy in November, so that she could have "one last Christmas" with her family and die in January 2015. Bellingham died in a London hospital on 19 October 2014 with her husband Michael by her side.

On 3 November 2014, her funeral took place at St Bartholomew's Church in Crewkerne. Bellingham was buried in Crewkerne Townsend Cemetery. Her headstone names her as Lynda Bellingham-Pattemore.

== Filmography ==
=== Film roles ===
Year	Title	Role	Notes
1976	Confessions of a Driving Instructor	Mary Truscott	
1977	Sweeney!	Janice Wyatt	
1977	Stand Up, Virgin Soldiers	Valerie	
1978	The Waterloo Bridge Handicap	Miss Beamish	
1981	Riding High	Miss Mott	
1998	The Scarlet Tunic	Emily Marlowe	
1999	Don't Go Breaking My Heart	Maxine	
2000	The Romanovs: An Imperial Family	Empress Alexandra Feodorovna	
2001	Bodywork	Poppy Fields	
2004	Devil's Gate	Marlene	

=== Television roles ===
Year	Title	Role	Notes
1971	The Misfit	Wee Jeanie	Episode: "On the New Establishment"
1971	ITV Sunday Night Theatre	Nurse Mary Tiller	Episode: "Mr. Pargiter"
1971	Kate	Hattie	2 Episodes
1971	A Family at War	Chrissie	3 Episodes
1972	The Fenn Street Gang	Liza	Episode: "From Sudbury with Love"
1972–1973	General Hospital	Nurse Hilda Price	27 Episodes
1973	Tell Tarby	Nurse Norma Snockers	6 Episodes
1974	Z-Cars	Pauline Tyson	Episode: "Pressure"
1974	A Little Bit of Wisdom	Gwen Morgan	Episode: "A Little Bit of Respect"
1974	Billy Liar	Alison	Episode: "Billy and the New Life"
1975	Within These Walls	Yvonne Melton	Episode: "The Slap"
1975	Z-Cars	Irene	3 Episodes
1975	The Sweeney	Nancy King	Episode: "Trojan Bus"
1976	Couples	Jack	6 Episodes
1976	Whodunnit?	Suzy Booth	Episode: "Dead Ball"
1976	Yus My Dear	Carole	Episode: "Woman Trouble"
1977	Yes, Honestly	Amanda	Episode: "Entertaining Mr. Roscoe"
1977	Doctor on the Go	Eleanor Wilcox	Episode: "What's in a Name?"
1977	Big Boy Now!	Brenda Bollington	Episode: "Supergirl"
1977	Cottage to Let	Barbara	Episode: "Second Opinion"
1977	The Fuzz	WPC Pamela ‘Purrfect’ Purvis	All 7 Episodes
1978	The Pink Medicine Show	Various	All 6 Episodes
1979	Don't Forget to Write!	Angela	Episode: "Enter Hitler"
1979	Hazell	Vanessa	Episode: "Hazell Gets the Part"
1979	Shoestring	Nicola	Episode: "Find the Lady"
1980	The Professionals	Betty Hope	Episode: "Slush Fund"
1980	Mackenzie	Ruth Isaacs	All 12 Episodes
1981	Funny Man	Gwen	11 Episodes
1981	Blake's 7	Vena	Episode: "Headhunter"
1982	Murphy's Mob	Elaine Murphy	12 Episodes
1982	Angels	Kathy Stone	5 Episodes
1982	Educating Marmalade	Registrar	Episode: "Walkies"
1984	The Gentle Touch	Alison Fairbrother	2 Episodes
1986	Doctor Who	The Inquisitor	14 Episodes
1987	Filthy Rich & Catflap	Ms Tomkins	Episode: #1.4
1987	Screen Two	Mary Morris	Episode: "The Vision"
1988–1990	All Creatures Great and Small	Helen Herriot	47 Episodes
1990–1993	Jackanory	Storyteller	9 Episodes
1991–1994	Second Thoughts	Faith Greyshott	All 49 Episodes
1994	Martin Chuzzlewit	Mrs. Lupin	5 Episodes
1995	Julia Jekyll and Harriet Hyde	Aunt Cassandra	Episode: "A Fright for Aunt Cassandra"
1995–1998	Faith in the Future	Faith Greyshott	All 22 Episodes
1998	Casualty	Steph Yates	Episode: "Trust"
2000–2003	At Home with the Braithwaites	Pauline Farnell	19 Episodes
2000	Reach for the Moon	Penny Martin	All 6 Episodes
2000	Bob Martin	Lynda Bellingham	Episode: "Mr. and Mrs."
2001	Waking the Dead	Mary Mantel	2 Episodes
2001	My Uncle Silas	Mrs. Gadsby	Episode: "The Widder"
2002	Happy Together	Teresa	TV film
2003	Hans Christian Andersen: My Life as a Fairytale	Landlady	TV film
2004	Midsomer Murders	Jane Willows	Episode: "The Fisher King"
2004	Dalziel and Pascoe	Jess Pitman	Episode: "Great Escapes"
2004	The Last Detective	Councillor Marjorie Balsam	Episode: "The Long Bank Holiday"
2004	Monkey Trousers	Various	TV film
2004	The Bill	Irene Radford	19 Episodes
2004	Odd Socks	Magdalena	Unaired TV series
2005	Murder in Suburbia	Milly Goodman	Episode: "The Wedding"
2006	Holby City	Caitlin Lucas	Episode: "Brother's Keeper"
2007	Bonkers	Mrs. Wadlow	5 episodes
2007	New Tricks	Det. Supt. Karen Hardwick	Episode: "Casualty"
2007	Robin Hood	Queen Eleanor	Episode: "Treasure of the Nation"
2008	Re-extinct	Marg Precious	TV film
2008	Love Soup	Matilda	Episode: "Whose God Is It Anyway?"
2009	Mister Eleven	Shirley	Both 2 Episodes
2011	Just Rosie	Lynda Bellingham	TV film
2014–2015	Too Close for Comfort	Mary	All 4 Episodes

== Radio ==
Year	Title	Role	Notes
1988-1992	Second Thoughts	Faith Greyshot	BBC Radio 4 sitcom in 31 episodes
1990	The Senses	Diana/Faith	Episode 5: Smell
1999	The Saturday Play:The Big Bazoohley	Muriel Mifflin	BBC Radio 4 dramaisation of The Big Bazoohley: A Story for Children by Peter Carey
1999	Comedy Hour: Heated Rollers		BBC Radio 4 comedy sketch show in 6 episodes
1999	The Dating Game	Presenter	BBC Radio 2
1999	Son of Santa	Miss Berry	BBC Radio 4 Festive comedy
2001-2004	The Change	Carol	BBC Radio 4 sitcom in 18 episodes
2002	Afternoon Play: Cuba Libre at the Cafe Espana	Marie	BBC Radio 4 play by Graham Mort
2004	Journeys and Migrations: Stories from the Belfast Festival	Story reader	BBC Radio 4, episode 1:Singles by Clare Boylan
2004	The Friday Play	Eileen	BBC Radio 4 drama production: Life Half Spent by Lizzie Mickery
2009	Three Women in a Motorhome	Read by	Episode 1 of 3: Pam's Story
2009	The Richest Man In Britain	Daves mum	BBC Radio 4 comedy by Nick Hornby & Giles Smith, 3 episodes

== Stage ==
Year	Title	Role	Notes
1969	A Man for All Seasons	Margaret More	Lyceum Theatre, Crewe
1969–1970	Doctor in the House	Monica	Lyceum Theatre, Crewe
1970	The Wheel of Fortune	Amy	Lyceum Theatre, Crewe
1970	Toad of Toad Hall	Ratty	Lyceum Theatre, Crewe
1974	Bordello	Rachel	Sondheim Theatre
1975	Norman, Is that You?	Mary	Phoenix Theatre
1975	My Fat Friend	Vicky	Theatre Royal, Windsor
1977	Castle in the Air	Boss Trent	Theatre Royal, Windsor
1978	The Flip Side	Sharon	Yvonne Arnaud Theatre, Croydon
1985	Strippers	Stripper	Phoenix Theatre
1985–1986	Look, No Hans!	Monica	Novello Theatre
2002	Marry Me You Idiot	Elinor Waugh	Jermyn Street Theatre, London
2005	Losing Louis	Elizabeth	Hampstead Theatre, Trafalgar Studios
2006	Sugar Mummies	Maggie	Royal Court Theatre
2007	Vincent River	Anita	Trafalgar Studios
2008–2009	Calendar Girls	Chris	Noël Coward Theatre
2010–2012	Calendar Girls	Chris	UK Tour
2011–2012	Cinderella	Fairy Godmother	Birmingham Hippodrome
2012–2013	Cinderella	Fairy Godmother	Alhambra Theatre, Bradford
2013–2014	Dick Whittington	Fairy Bowbells	White Rock Theatre, Hastings
