= Penelope Keith =

English actress (1940–2026)

Dame Penelope Keith DBE DL
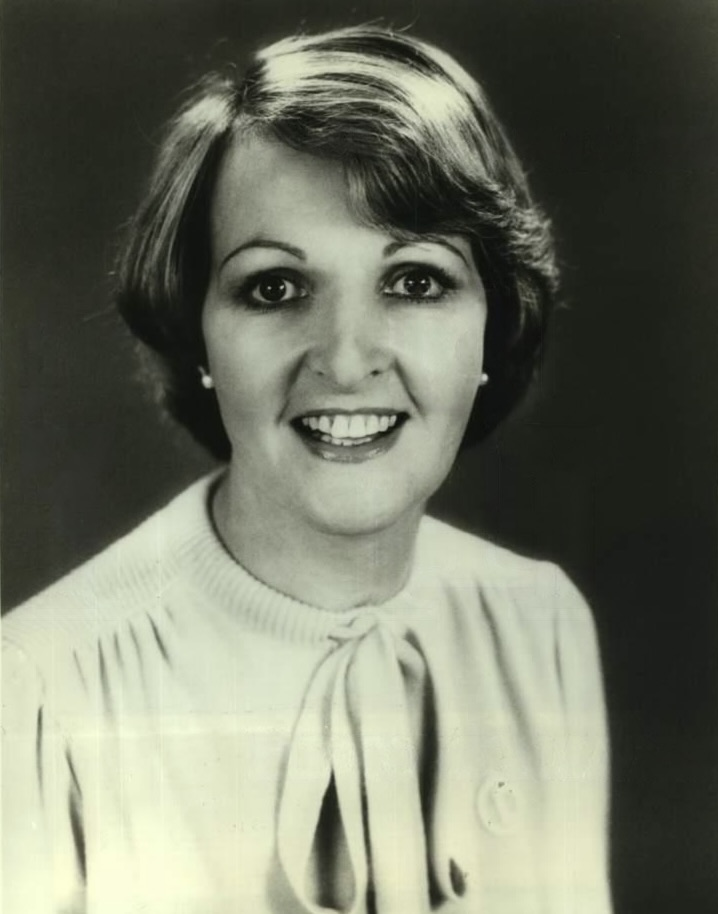
- Publicity photo, 1984
- Born: Penelope Anne Constance Hatfield; 2 April 1940; Sutton, Surrey, England
- Died: 29 June 2026 (aged 86); Milford, Surrey, England
- Occupations: Actress; presenter
- Years active: 1959–2026
- Spouse: Rodney Timson (m. 1978)
- Children: 2

Dame Penelope Anne Constance Keith (née Hatfield; 2 April 1940 – 29 June 2026) was an English actress. Active in film, radio, stage and television, where she was also a presenter, Keith was primarily known for her roles in the British sitcoms The Good Life (1975–1978) and To the Manor Born (1979–1981, 2007). She succeeded Laurence Olivier as president of the Actors' Benevolent Fund after his death in 1989 and was appointed Dame Commander of the Order of the British Empire (DBE) in the 2014 New Year Honours for services to the arts and to charity.

Keith joined the Royal Shakespeare Company in 1963 and went on to win the 1976 Olivier Award for Best Comedy Performance for the play Donkeys' Years. She became a household name in the UK playing Margo Leadbetter in The Good Life (1975–1978), winning the 1977 BAFTA TV Award for Best Light Entertainment Performance. In 1978, Keith won the BAFTA TV Award for Best Actress for The Norman Conquests. She then starred as Audrey fforbes-Hamilton in To the Manor Born (1979–1981), a series that attracted audiences of more than 20 million.

Keith went on to star in another six sitcoms, including Executive Stress (1986–1988), No Job for a Lady (1990–1992) and Next of Kin (1995–1997). From 2000, she worked in the theatre, with roles including Madam Arcati in Blithe Spirit (2004) and Lady Bracknell in The Importance of Being Earnest (2007). Starting in 2014, she presented several successful series of documentaries about English villages and this genteel role continued until her final year with the series Saving Country Houses.

== Early life ==
Penelope Anne Constance Hatfield was born on 2 April 1940 in Sutton, Surrey. Her father, an army officer who was a major by the end of the Second World War, left her mother, Connie, when Keith was a baby; she spent her early years in Clacton-on-Sea, Essex, and Clapham, south London. Her great-uncle, John Gurney Nutting, was a partner in the coachbuilding firm J Gurney Nutting & Co Limited, and Keith recalled sitting in the Prince of Wales's car.

Although not a Roman Catholic, at the age of six she was sent to a Catholic convent boarding school run by French nuns in Seaford, East Sussex, with Judy Cornwell. Here she became interested in acting, and she frequently went to matinées in the West End with her mother. When she was eight, her mother remarried and she adopted her stepfather's surname, Keith. Although she did not get on with her stepfather, her mother was a "rock of love" to her. She was rejected by the Central School of Speech and Drama on the grounds that, at 5 ft 10 in (1.78 m), she was too tall. However, she was then accepted at the Webber Douglas Academy of Dramatic Art and spent two years there while working at the Hyde Park Hotel in the evenings.

She began her career working in repertory theatre around Britain, including Lincoln, Manchester, and Salisbury. Her earliest appearances were in The Tunnel of Love, Gigi, and Flowering Cherry. In 1963, she joined the Royal Shakespeare Company and acted with them in Stratford and at the Aldwych Theatre in London.

== Career ==
=== Early career ===
Keith began her television career with appearances in programmes such as The Army Game, Dixon of Dock Green, Wild, Wild Women and The Avengers. In the early 1970s, she featured in The Morecambe & Wise Show, Ghost Story and The Pallisers. Her film work during this period included roles in Every Home Should Have One, Take A Girl Like You, Rentadick and Penny Gold. In 1967, she had a minor part in Carry On Doctor, although her scene was removed from the final cut. She also appeared in an uncredited role as a nurse in A Touch of Love (1969).

Her best-known theatre appearance came in 1974, when she played Sarah in The Norman Conquests, alongside Felicity Kendal, her co-star in The Good Life.

In 1977, Keith starred in Brian Sibley's comedy radio broadcast titled ...And Yet Another Partridge in a Pear Tree, voicing Cynthia Bracegirdle, whose boyfriend, Algernon Fotherington-Smythe, sends her the 364 gifts mentioned in "The Twelve Days of Christmas".

=== Television fame ===
Keith achieved fame in 1975 when the BBC sitcom The Good Life began. In the first episode, she was only heard and not seen in her role as Margo Leadbetter. As Keith subsequently developed the character, Margo became loved as a hilarious caricature of the ultimate suburban snob, to whom her office-commuter husband Jerry was completely in thrall. In 1977, Keith won a BAFTA award for Best Light Entertainment Performance for the portrayal.

From 1979 to 1981, she played the lead role of Audrey fforbes-Hamilton in the TV series To the Manor Born. Following this, Keith appeared in the lead role in six other sitcoms: Sweet Sixteen, Moving, Executive Stress, No Job for a Lady, Law and Disorder and Next of Kin. She also starred in a TV adaptation of Agatha Christie's play Spider's Web. She won a second BAFTA award, for Best Actress, in 1978 for The Norman Conquests.

In 1982, Keith starred in a TV production of Frederick Lonsdale's On Approval. In 1988, she hosted one series of the ITV panel show What's My Line?, following the death of its former presenter, Eamonn Andrews. She had a featured role in the 1998 ITV serial Coming Home.

=== Work ===
Keith regularly appeared on stage, taking the classics and new plays across the UK. These include Shakespeare, Shaw, Sheridan, Wilde, Rattigan and Congreve. She played Lorraine in Noël Coward's Star Quality, while in 2004 she played Madame Arcati in Coward's Blithe Spirit at the Savoy Theatre. In 2004, Keith starred in the first of ten full-cast BBC radio dramatisations of M.C. Beaton's Agatha Raisin novels, playing the title role. Two years later, she appeared at the Chichester Festival in the premiere of Richard Everett's comedy Entertaining Angels, which she later took on tour.

In 2007, Keith played the part of Lady Bracknell in The Importance of Being Earnest on tour, which transferred to the West End in 2008, at the Vaudeville Theatre. She voiced adverts including ones for Pimm's, Lurpak, Tesco and most famously, The Parker Pen Company, which was named one of the 100 Greatest Adverts in a Channel 4 programme. In 2012, she starred in Keith Waterhouse's Good Grief, having previously appeared in the play's premiere production in 1998.

In 1997, Keith starred in the radio adaptations of To the Manor Born. In 2003, she appeared opposite June Brown in the television film Margery & Gladys. In 2007, she starred in a one-off To the Manor Born Christmas Special. Keith also voiced The Bear with Brown Fuzzy Hair in Teletubbies.

In 2009, Keith presented Penelope Keith and the Fast Lady, a one-off documentary for BBC Four about Dorothy Levitt, the Edwardian motoring pioneer. She presented the four-part BBC documentary The Manor Reborn in 2011.

In 2013, Keith played the part of Lady Catherine de Bourgh in the BBC period drama Death Comes to Pemberley, an adaptation of the best-selling 2011 P. D. James novel of the same name.

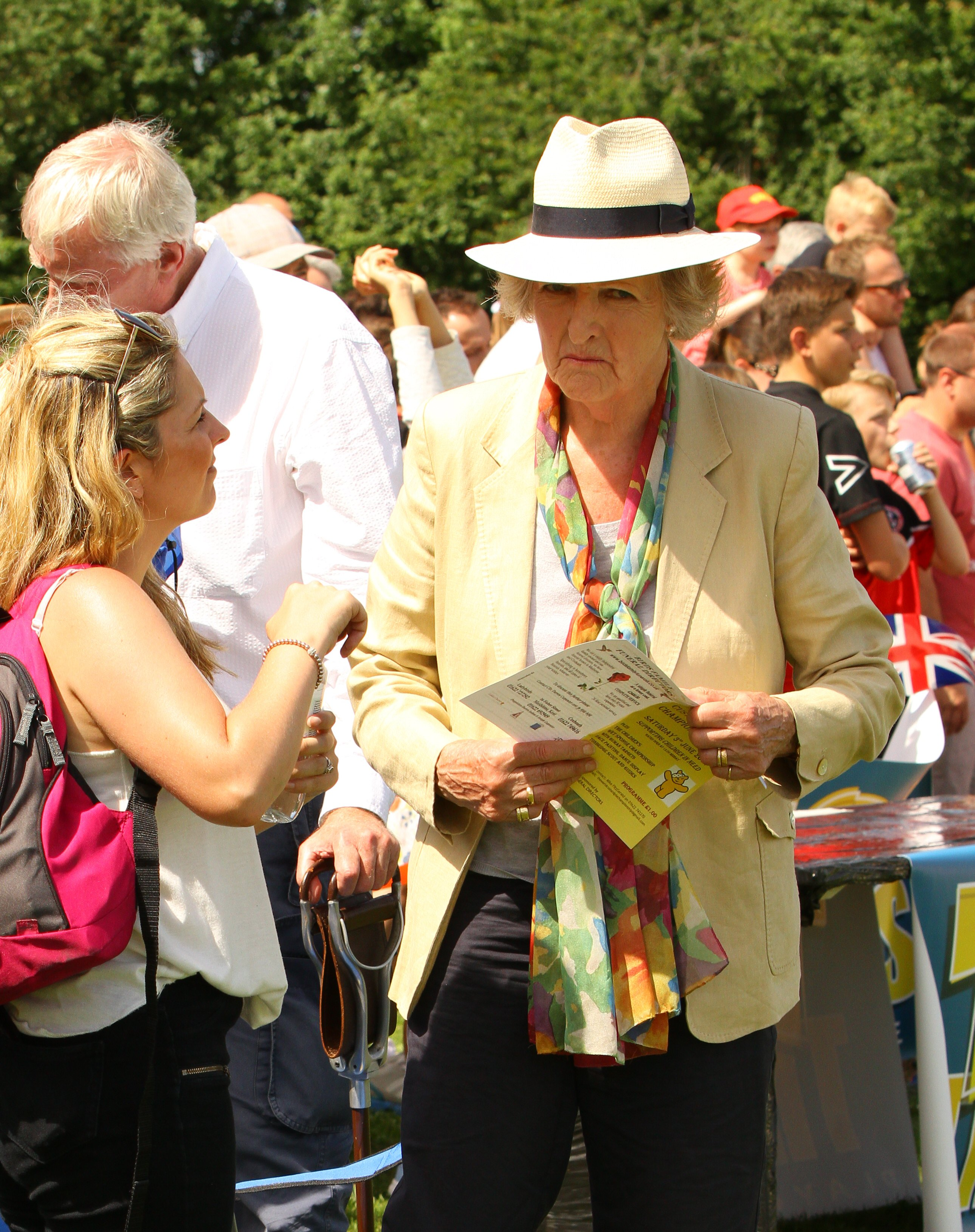
Attending the World Custard Pie Championship in Coxheath in 2017 for Channel 4's Village of the Year show.

From 2014, Keith presented three series of the More4/Channel 4 programme Penelope Keith's Hidden Villages and in June 2016 she presented Penelope Keith at Her Majesty's Service again for Channel 4.

In 2014, she presented 4 Extra Goes Gardening, in which she celebrated the work of garden designer Gertrude Jekyll at her former home, Munstead Wood in Godalming.

In December 2017, Keith presented Penelope Keith's Coastal Villages, a continuation of the Hidden Villages series. In early 2018, she presented the Channel 4 series Village of the Year with Penelope Keith. It was announced in February 2018 that Keith would be starring as Mrs St Maugham in the Chichester Festival Theatre production of Enid Bagnold's The Chalk Garden from 25 May to 16 June 2018.

In late 2025, TVF International announced Saving Country Houses, a new series hosted by Keith, which was broadcast in the UK on Channel 4 in 2026.

== Personal life and death ==
In 1978, she married Rodney Timson, a policeman. They had met while he was on duty at Chichester Festival Theatre, where Keith was performing. In 1988, ten years after their wedding, they adopted two brothers. Keith and Timson lived in Milford, Surrey. Keith had a passion for gardening and had a rose named after her in 1984.

The couple had a holiday home in the Scottish village of Avoch on the Black Isle. They had attempted to open a tea shop there on the site of a former filling station, resulting in a planning battle. Eventually the couple decided to make the place a public garden instead.

Keith was president of the Actors' Benevolent Fund from 1990 to 2022, taking over after the death of Laurence Olivier. She was a trustee of Brooklands Museum for several years. She was also president of the South West Surrey chapter of the National Trust until her death.

Keith died of cancer at her home in Milford, on 29 June 2026, aged 86. Her funeral was held at Guildford Cathedral on 28 July.

== Works ==
=== Film ===
Year	Title	Role	Notes	Ref.
1967	Carry On Doctor	Plain Nurse	scenes cut	
1968	Secret Ceremony	Hotel Assistant	uncredited	
1969	A Touch of Love	Nurse	uncredited	
1970	Take a Girl Like You	Tory Lady		
1970	Every Home Should Have One	Lotte von Gelbstein		
1972	Rentadick	Reporter		
1973	Penny Gold	Miss Hartridge		
1974	Ghost Story	Rennie		
1976	Seven Nights in Japan	Mrs. Hollander (voice)		
1978	The Hound of the Baskervilles	Massage Receptionist		
1981	Priest of Love	Dorothy Brett		
1992	Aladdin	Madam Dim Sum	voice	

=== Television ===
Year	Title	Role	Notes	Ref.
1961	The Army Game	Primrose	1 episode	
1965	Dixon of Dock Green	Miss Nash	Episode: "A Fine Art"	
1965	Six Shades of Black	Lady Pandora Brewster	Episode: "There is a Happy Land..."	
1965, 1967, 1969	The Avengers	Various	3 episodes	
1968	Wild, Wild Women	Daisy	Pilot	
1970–1972	Kate	Wanda Padbury		
1974	The Pallisers	Mrs. Hittaway	2 episodes	
1975	Two's Company	Mrs. Phillips	Episode: "The Patient"	
1975–1978	The Good Life	Margo Leadbetter		
1975–1984	Jackanory	Storyteller	11 episodes	
1976-1980	Call My Bluff	Self	6 episodes	
1977	The Morecambe & Wise Show	Self	Christmas Special	
1979–1981, 2007	To the Manor Born	Audrey fforbes-Hamilton		
1982	Sweet Sixteen	Helen Morgan	6 episodes	
1984	Hay Fever	Judith Bliss	TV play	
1985	Moving	Sarah Gladwyn		
1986–1988	Executive Stress	Caroline Fielding		
1990–1992	No Job for a Lady	Jean Price		
1994	Law and Disorder	Phillipa Troy		
1995–1997	Next of Kin	Maggie Prentice	22 episodes	
1997	Teletubbies	The Bear (voice)	Episode: "See-Saw"	
1998	Coming Home	Aunt Louise	Part One	
2003	Margery & Gladys	Margery Heywood	TV movie	
2006	The Secret Show	Nanna Poo-Poo (voice)	Episode: "Commando Babies"	
2009	Penelope Keith and the Fast Lady	Presenter	1 episode	
2011	Tinga Tinga Tales	Queen Bee (voice)	Episode: "Why Bees Sing"	
2011	The Manor Reborn	Series Co-host		
2013	Death Comes to Pemberley	Lady Catherine de Bourgh	1 episode	
2014-2016	Penelope Keith's Hidden Villages	Presenter	12 episodes	
2016	Penelope Keith at Her Majesty's Service	Presenter	4 episodes	
2017-2018	Penelope Keith's Coastal Villages	Presenter	3 episodes	
2018	Village of the Year with Penelope Keith	Presenter	24 episodes	
2026	Saving Country Houses with Penelope Keith	Presenter	10 episodes	

=== Theatre ===
Year	Title	Role	Notes	Ref.
1959	The Tunnel of Love	Alice Pepper	Professional debut	
1959	Harlequinade	Edna Selby	Webber Douglas Academy of Dramatic Art	
1963	The Tempest		Royal Shakespeare Theatre	
1963	Julius Caesar		Royal Shakespeare Theatre	
1963	Henry VI	Simpcox's Wife	Royal Shakespeare Theatre	
1963	Richard III	Lord Mayor's Wife	Royal Shakespeare Theatre	
1963	Oedipus Rex	Jocasta	Royal Shakespeare Theatre	
1963	The Lower-Middle Class Wedding Party	Lady	Royal Shakespeare Theatre	
1963–1964	Henry VI		Royal Shakespeare Theatre	
1963–1964	Julius Caesar		Royal Shakespeare Theatre	
1963–1964	Richard III		Royal Shakespeare Theatre	
1963–1964	The Tempest		Royal Shakespeare Theatre	
1964	Richard III	Lord Mayor's Wife	Aldwych Theatre	
1964	Henry VI	Simpcox's Wife	Aldwych Theatre	
1965	Puntila	Dean's Wife	Aldwych Theatre	
1965	The Investigation	Witness 5	Aldwych Theatre	
1965–1966	The Investigation	Witness 5	Aldwych Theatre	
1966	Ballad of the False Barman	Big Molly	Hampstead Theatre Club	
1971–1972	Suddenly at Home	Maggie Howard	Fortune Theatre	
1973	The House of Bernarda Alba	Magdalena	Greenwich Theatre	
1973	Catsplay	Ilona	Greenwich Theatre	
1974	Fallen Angels		Watford Palace Theatre	
1974–1975	The Norman Conquests	Sarah	Globe Theatre	
1976–1977	Donkey's Years	Lady Driver	Globe Theatre	
1977–1978	The Apple Cart	Orinthia	Chichester Festival Theatre and Phoenix Theatre	
1978–1979	The Millionairess	Epifania	Theatre Royal Haymarket	
1981	Moving	Sarah Gladwin	Queen's Theatre	
1982	Hobson's Choice	Maggie Hobson	Theatre Royal Haymarket	
1982	Captain Brassbound's Conversion	Lady Cicely Wayneflete	Theatre Royal Haymarket	
1983–1984	Hay Fever	Judith Bliss	Queen's Theatre	
1985–1986	The Dragon's Tail	Mary	Apollo Theatre	
1987	Miranda	Miranda	Chichester Festival Theatre	
1988	The Deep Blue Sea	Hester Collyer	Theatre Royal Haymarket	
1991	The Importance of Being Earnest	Lady Bracknell	Theatre Royal, Bath and tour	
1991–1992	On Approval		Theatre Royal, Bath and tour	
1992–1993	Relatively Speaking	Director	Theatre Royal, Bath and tour	
1994	How the Other Half Loves	Director	Theatre Royal, Windsor and Richmond Theatre	
1997	Mrs Warren's Profession	Mrs. Warren	Theatre Royal, Bath and tour	
1998	Good Grief	June Pepper	Theatre Royal, Bath and tour	
2001–2002	Star Quality	Lorraine Barrie	Theatre Royal, Windsor, tour and Apollo Theatre	
2003–2004	Time and the Conways	Mrs. Conway	Belgrade Theatre, Coventry and tour	
2004–2005	Blithe Spirit	Madame Arcati	Savoy Theatre	
2006	Entertaining Angels	Grace	Chichester Festival Theatre and tour	
2007–2008	The Importance of Being Earnest	Lady Bracknell	Theatre Royal, Bath, tour and Vaudeville Theatre	
2009	Entertaining Angels	Grace	Theatre Royal, Bath and tour	
2010–2011	The Rivals	Mrs Malaprop	Theatre Royal, Bath, tour and Theatre Royal Haymarket	
2012	The Way of the World	Lady Wishfort	Chichester Festival Theatre	
2018	The Chalk Garden	Mrs St Maugham	Chichester Festival Theatre	
2020	Theatrical Digs	Performer	Yvonne Arnaud Theatre, Guildford	

=== Radio ===
Year	Title	Role	Notes	Ref.
1965	The Investigation	Witness 5	BBC Network Three broadcast version of the play	
1965	The Citadel	Mrs. Frances Lawrence	BBC Home Service, 2 episodes	
1974	The Monday Play: Aggie	Mary Knockholt	A political cartoon for radio by Lester Powell	
1976	Desert Island Discs	Self	Favourite track: Introduction and Allegro for Strings by Edward Elgar Book: A La Recherche Du Temps Perdu by Marcel Proust Luxury: Lapsang Souchong tea	
1977	...And Yet Another Partridge in a Pear Tree	Cynthia Bracegirdle		
1979	Just Before Midnight	Mrs Frobisher	The Hospital Visitor bv Frank Marcus, part of an anthology of plays for BBC Radio 4	
1982	The Dog It Was That Died	Pamela Blair	BBC Radio 3 version of the Tom Stoppard play	
1989	Book at Bedtime	Self	An Unsuitable Attachment by Barbara Pym in 10 episodes	
1997	To the Manor Born	Audrey Forbes-Hamilton	BBC Radio 2 version of the BBC 1 television sitcom	
2003–2006	Agatha Raisin	Agatha Raisin	BBC Radio 4 series	

== Awards and honours ==
On 2 April 2002, her 62nd birthday, Keith began a one-year term as High Sheriff of Surrey, the third woman to hold the post. She had also served in the past as a Deputy Lieutenant of Surrey.

Keith was appointed an Officer of the Order of the British Empire (OBE) in the 1989 New Year Honours. She was made a Commander of the Order of the British Empire (CBE) in the 2007 New Year Honours for "charitable services". In the 2014 New Year Honours, she was made a Dame Commander of the Order of the British Empire (DBE) for services to the arts and to charity.

Year	Award	Work	Result	ref.
1976	Olivier Award for Best Actress in a New Play	Donkey's Years	Nominated	
1976	Olivier Award for Best Comedy Performance	Donkey's Years	Won	
1977	BAFTA TV Award for Best Actress	Private Lives	Nominated	
1977	BAFTA TV Award for Best Light Entertainment Performance	The Good Life	Won	
1978	BAFTA TV Award for Best Actress	The Norman Conquests / Saving it for Albie	Won	
1978	BAFTA TV Award for Best Light Entertainment Performance	The Good Life / The Morecambe & Wise Show	Nominated	
1980	BAFTA TV Award for Best Light Entertainment Performance	To the Manor Born	Nominated	
