= The Lavender Hill Mob (play) =

2022 play

- Original language: English
- Written by: Phil Porter (play); T. E. B. Clarke (screenplay)

Premiere
- Date: 13 October 2022
- Place: Everyman Theatre, Cheltenham

The Lavender Hill Mob is a play based on the 1951 Ealing comedy film with a screenplay by T. E. B. Clarke, adapted for the stage by Phil Porter.

== Production history ==
The play made its world premiere at the Everyman Theatre, Cheltenham on 13 October 2022 before touring the UK. The production was directed by Jeremy Sams and starred Miles Jupp as Henry Holland and Justin Edwards as Alfred Pendlebury.

== Cast and characters ==
Character	UK tour (2022)
Henry Holland	Miles Jupp
Alfred Pendlebury	Justin Edwards
Farrow	Guy Burgess
Lady Agnes	Tessa Churchard
Sir Horace	John Dougall
Sammy	Tim Sutton
Audrey	Victoria Blunt
Fernanda	Aamira Challenger
Understudy	Steven Rostance
Understudy	Sharon Adugna
Understudy	Paul Willcocks
