= The Lavender Hill Mob =

1951 film by Charles Crichton

- British quad poster
- Directed by: Charles Crichton
- Written by: T. E. B. Clarke
- Produced by: Michael Balcon
- Starring: Alec Guinness; Stanley Holloway; Sid James; Alfie Bass
- Cinematography: Douglas Slocombe
- Edited by: Seth Holt
- Music by: Georges Auric
- Production company: Ealing Studios
- Distributed by: General Film Distributors
- Release date: 28 June 1951 (UK)
- Running time: 81 minutes
- Country: United Kingdom
- Language: English
- Box office: $31,288

The Lavender Hill Mob is a 1951 British comedy film from Ealing Studios, written by T. E. B. Clarke, directed by Charles Crichton, starring Alec Guinness and Stanley Holloway and featuring Sid James and Alfie Bass. The title refers to Lavender Hill, a street in Battersea, a district in London SW11, near to Clapham Junction railway station. It was one of the first films to feature Audrey Hepburn, in a minor role.

The British Film Institute ranked The Lavender Hill Mob the 17th greatest British film of all time. The original film was digitally restored and re-released to UK cinemas on 29 July 2011 to celebrate its 60th anniversary. It is one of fifteen films listed in the category "Art" on the Vatican film list.

== Plot ==
Henry "Dutch" Holland lives the life of luxury in Rio de Janeiro, and spends an evening dining out with a British visitor. During their meal, he narrates a story concerning how he changed his life by instigating an intricate gold bullion robbery. One year ago, Holland served as an unambitious London bank clerk, who for twenty years was in charge of gold bullion deliveries. Although dedicated to his job with a reputation for fussing over details, he had begun to devise a scheme to steal a consignment of gold bullion. His plan was missing a way to sell the gold because the black market in Britain would be too risky; he did not yet know how to smuggle it abroad.

One evening at his boarding house in Lavender Hill, he meets with artist Alfred Pendlebury, who has taken up lodgings in the building. He learns that Pendlebury owns a foundry that makes presents and souvenirs that are sold in holiday destinations, one of which is Paris.

Realizing that Pendlebury is the key to his plan's success, Holland explains his scheme to the artist who agrees to help. When the clerk discovers he is due to be transferred to another bank department, the pair put their plan into immediate action, recruiting the aid of petty thieves Lackery Wood and Shorty Fisher. On the day of the robbery, Wood and Fisher hijack the bullion van and switch the gold to one of Pendlebury's works vans. Holland then assumes the role of an unfortunate victim who is hailed as a hero for raising the alarm, after nearly drowning by accident. As his associates melt down the gold bullion and recast it as Eiffel Tower paperweights to be exported abroad, Holland gives false statements and misleading clues to the police, led by Inspector Farrow. The group soon toast to their success, despite Wood and Fisher being unable or unwilling to travel to Paris to collect their share in person, entrusting the other two to provide it.

The day after their last consignment of stolen gold is sent to Paris, Holland and Pendlebury head to France to retrieve them from a souvenir kiosk atop the Eiffel Tower supplied by Pendlebury's firm. They are horrified when they find one of the boxes containing the golden paperweights has been opened by mistake and six have been sold to a group of English schoolgirls. The pair make a wild chase to pursue them back to Britain, manage to track down the schoolgirls, but only get back five of the paperweights. The girl holding the sixth one refuses, intending it as a gift to a policeman she is friends with. Holland and Pendlebury pursue the girl, and watch in horror as the paperweight is brought to an exhibition of police history and methods at Hendon Police College. Holland's worst fears come true when Farrow, having begun to realize the truth, spots the paperweight and orders a chemical test on it.

Left with no choice, Holland snatches it, and he and Pendlebury make their escape in a stolen police car. A confusing pursuit begins across London, as Holland uses the car's radio to feed false, misleading information to the officers pursuing the pair. They find themselves forced to offer a passing police officer a lift, causing them to be discovered. As Pendlebury becomes trapped, Holland escapes with the six golden paperweights, which leave him with a tidy sum to enjoy a new life. Back in Rio, after finishing his tale to his visitor, Holland admits that the money is now all gone. As the pair walk out, it is revealed that Holland is handcuffed to the man and has been arrested for his crime.

== Cast ==
- Alec Guinness as Henry "Dutch" Holland
- Stanley Holloway as Alfred "Al" Pendlebury
- Sid James as Lackery Wood
- Alfie Bass as Shorty Fisher
- Marjorie Fielding as Mrs. Chalk
- John Gregson as Inspector Farrow
- Clive Morton as station sergeant
- Ronald Adam as Turner
- Sydney Tafler as Clayton
- Edie Martin as Miss Evesham
- Jacques B. Brunius as customs official
- Paul Demel as customs official
- Eugene Deckers as customs official
- Andreas Malandrinos as customs official
- John Salew as Parkin
- Arthur Hambling as Wallis
- Gibb McLaughlin as Godwin
- Marie Burke as Senora Gallardo
- Audrey Hepburn as Chiquita
- William Fox as Gregory
- Michael Trubshawe as British ambassador
- Cyril Chamberlain as commander
- Moultrie Kelsall as detective superintendent
- Christopher Hewett as Inspector Talbot
- Meredith Edwards as P.C. Williams
- Patrick Barr as divisional detective inspector
- David Davies as city policeman
- Desmond Llewelyn as customs official (uncredited)
- Richard Wattis as opposition Member of Parliament (MP) (uncredited)
- Marie Ney as school headmistress (uncredited)
- Robert Shaw as police laboratory technician (uncredited)
- Patricia Garwood made her first film appearance in this movie at the age of nine.

== Production ==
Charles Crichton says the origin of the film came with the success of The Blue Lamp. Michael Balcon, head of Ealing, got screenwriter Clarke to come up with ideas for a follow-up.

Clarke is said to have come up with the idea of a clerk robbing his own bank while doing research for the film Pool of London (1951), a crime thriller surrounding a jewel theft. He consulted the Bank of England on the project and it set up a special committee to advise on how best the robbery could take place.

Extensive location filming was made in both London and Paris. The scenes show a London still marked by bomb sites from the Second World War.

London

- Bank Underground Station
- Bank of England, Threadneedle Street
- Bramley Arms Pub, Bramley Road, Notting Hill (finale: end of the chase)
- Cheapside
- Carlton Road, Ealing (zebra crossing on way to police exhibition)
- Gunnersbury Park (police exhibition)
- Queen Victoria Street, Blackfriars (scene of bullion robbery)
- RAF Northolt, Ruislip (airport)

Paris

- River Seine
- Eiffel Tower

The scene where Holland and Pendlebury run down the Eiffel Tower's spiral staircase and become increasingly dizzy and erratic, as does the camera work, presages James Stewart's condition in Alfred Hitchcock's Vertigo, made seven years later. A film montage of sensational newspaper headlines marks the crime as taking place in August 1950, whilst posters for the Hendon exhibition state that it marks the centenary of the death of Sir Robert Peel, which occurred on 2 July 1850. In the car chase scene at the end of the film, an officer uses a police box to report seeing a police car being driven by a man in a top hat. In fact, the driver is a modern-day police officer from the exhibition wearing the uniform of the police as originally set up in 1829 by Peel, known as "Bobbies" or "Peelers" after him.

== Reception ==
The Lavender Hill Mob had its charity world premiere at the Marble Arch Odeon cinema in London on 28 June 1951.

It had rentals of $580,000 at the U.S. box office. The film was a hit at the British box office, being judged by Kinematograph Weekly as a "notable performer" at British cinemas in 1951.

Bosley Crowther of The New York Times gave the film a positive review, writing "Charles Crichton has directed the whole thing with a touch of polite and gentile mockery applied to wholehearted farce: that Mr. Guinness and Mr. Holloway are deliciously adroit in their roles." Reviewing the film on its sixtieth anniversary, Peter Bradshaw of The Guardian called it "tremendously good fun, though lighter in tone than Ealing's two scabrous masterpieces Kind Hearts and Coronets and The Ladykillers, and not quite matching their elegant perfection" noting that the superb setup is not quite matched by the aftermath of the heist. Kim Newman writing for Empire magazine gave it 4 out of 5, "Guinness is masterful as the apparently unassuming Mr. Holland".

On the review aggregator website Rotten Tomatoes, 100% of 72 critics' reviews are positive, with an average rating of 8.6/10. The website's consensus reads: "Fiendishly funny and clever, The Lavender Hill Mob is a top hat Ealing Studios effort."

== Accolades ==
The film won the Academy Award for Best Writing, Story and Screenplay. Guinness was nominated for the award of Best Actor in a Leading Role. The film also won the BAFTA Award for Best British Film.

== Stage adaptation ==
A stage adaptation of the film written by Phil Porter and directed by Jeremy Sams opened in October 2022 at the Everyman Theatre, Cheltenham before touring the UK, starring Miles Jupp as Henry Holland and Justin Edwards as Alfred Pendlebury.

== See also ==
- 1951 in film
- BFI Top 100 British films
- British films of 1951
- Heist film
