= Jane Horrocks =

British actress (born 1964)

- Born: Barbara Jane Horrocks; 18 January 1964 (age 62); Rawtenstall, Lancashire, England
- Occupation: Actress
- Years active: 1986–present
- Notable work: Life is Sweet (1990); The Rise and Fall of Little Voice (1992 play); Little Voice (1998)
- Television: Absolutely Fabulous (1992–2012); Fifi and the Flowertots (2005–2010); Little Princess (2006–2020); Trollied (2011–2015)
- Partner: Nick Vivian (until 2017)
- Children: 2

Barbara Jane Horrocks (born 18 January 1964) is a British actress. She portrayed both Katy Grin and Bubble in the BBC sitcom Absolutely Fabulous. She was nominated for the 1993 Olivier Award for Best Actress for the title role in the stage play The Rise and Fall of Little Voice, and received Golden Globe, BAFTA and Screen Actors Guild Award nominations for the role in the film version of Little Voice.

She is also known for her appearances in films, including The Dressmaker (1988), The Witches (1990), Second Best (1993), Life is Sweet (1990), Chicken Run (2000), Corpse Bride (2005), Sunshine on Leith (2013) and Absolutely Fabulous: The Movie (2016), as well as the television series Fifi and the Flowertots (2005–2010), Little Princess (2006–2020) and the Sky One sitcom Trollied, as Julie Cook (2011–2015).

== Early life ==
Horrocks was born in Rawtenstall, Lancashire, the daughter of Barbara (née Ashworth), a hospital worker, and John Horrocks, a sales representative. She is the youngest of three children.

She attended Balladen County Primary School and Fearns County Secondary School. She trained at Oldham College and at the Royal Academy of Dramatic Art with Imogen Stubbs and Ralph Fiennes, and began her career with the Royal Shakespeare Company.

== Career ==
=== Stage ===
Horrocks has appeared on stage in Ask for the Moon (Hampstead, 1986), A Collier's Friday Night (Greenwich, 1987), Valued Friends (Hampstead, 1989) and The Debutante Ball (Hampstead, 1989). She appeared in Our Own Kind (Bush, 1991), Deadly Advice (Fletcher, 1993), Cabaret (Donmar Warehouse 1994), Macbeth (Greenwich Theatre, 1995) and Absurd Person Singular (Garrick Theatre, 2007).

While working on Road, a play directed by Jim Cartwright, Horrocks warmed up by doing singing impressions of Judy Garland, Shirley Bassey and Ethel Merman. Cartwright was so impressed with her mimicry he wrote The Rise and Fall of Little Voice for her. She was nominated for the Laurence Olivier Award for Best Actress at the 1993 Laurence Olivier Awards for her performance in the 1992 West End production, directed by her then-boyfriend Sam Mendes.. She then went on to star as Sally Bowles in the 1993 revival production of Cabaret, also directed by Sam Mendes.

Her last West End appearance was in Sweet Panic, the 2003 Stephen Poliakoff drama in which she portrayed a neurotic mother locked in a battle of wills with her disturbed son's psychologist. She starred in Richard Jones's critically acclaimed production of The Good Soul of Szechuan at the Young Vic in 2008. She was reunited with Jones in a new musical production of Annie Get Your Gun, which opened at the Young Vic in October 2009. At London's Young Vic, in 2016's If You Kiss Me, Kiss Me, Horrocks revisited the songs of her youth to sing versions of tracks by the likes of Joy Division, The Smiths, Buzzcocks, and The Human League.

In October 2014, Horrocks played Ella Khan in the London revival of East Is East at Trafalgar Studios as part of Jamie Lloyd's Trafalgar Transformed season. In 2024, Horrocks joined the cast of the British premiere production of play Nachtland at the Young Vic theatre, directed by Patrick Marber.

In August 2024, Horrocks starred as Meg in Harold Pinter's The Birthday Party at the Ustinov Studio.

=== Screen ===
She appeared in Catherine Cookson's The Fifteen Streets, alongside Sean Bean and Owen Teale and portrayed Pattern, the housemaid, in Stuart Orme's The Wolves of Willoughby Chase. Both films were released in 1989. She drew critical notice for her performance in the film Life Is Sweet (1990). She also portrayed Miss Irvine, the mistreated assistant of Eva Ernst / The Grand High Witch in Nicolas Roeg's The Witches (1990). Horrocks became well known on screen for her role as Bubble and Katy Grin in the sitcom Absolutely Fabulous (1992–2016).

She reprised her stage role in the 1998 screen adaptation, Little Voice, which earned nominations for the Golden Globe Award for Best Actress - Motion Picture Musical or Comedy at the 56th Golden Globe Awards, the BAFTA Award for Best Actress in a Leading Role at the 52nd British Academy Film Awards, the Satellite Award for Best Actress - Motion Picture Musical or Comedy at the 3rd Golden Satellite Awards, the Screen Actors Guild Award for Outstanding Performance by a Female Actor in a Leading Role - Motion Picture at the 5th Screen Actors Guild Awards, and the British Independent Film Award for Best Actress.

For 10 years, Horrocks appeared with Prunella Scales in commercials for the UK supermarket chain Tesco. She narrated BBC Two's television series The Speaker in April 2009.

In 2009, Horrocks took the lead in the BBC TV production Gracie!, a drama portraying the life of Gracie Fields during World War II and her relationship with the Italian-born director Monty Banks (played by Tom Hollander).

Other television credits include Absolutely Fabulous, Victoria Wood - We'd Quite Like to Apologise, Bad Girl, Boon, Heartland, Hunting Venus, La Nonna, Leaving Home, Never Mind the Horrocks, Nightlife, Wyrd Sisters, Foxbusters, Jericho, Red Dwarf, Some Kind of Life, Suffer the Little Children, The Storyteller, The Garden, Fifi & the Flowertots, Little Princess (the voice of the princess) and Welcome to the Times.

She was the subject of an episode of the genealogy series Who Do You Think You Are? in 2006. That year, she played the title role of Ros Pritchard in The Amazing Mrs Pritchard, a drama about a woman elected prime minister.

On 14 January 2014, Horrocks appeared as a contestant on The Great Sport Relief Bake Off on BBC Two— the celebrity version of The Great British Bake Off—hosted by Jo Brand and broadcast to help raise money for the charity Sport Relief. The other contestants were TV and radio presenter Kirsty Young, choreographer Jason Gardiner, and Olympic athlete Greg Rutherford.

On 9 May 2015, she gave a reading at VE Day 70: A Party to Remember in Horse Guards Parade, London that was broadcast live on BBC1.

In 2015, she supplied the voice of the Tubby Phone in the reboot of the popular British children's television series Teletubbies. In 2021, she began starring in the Sky comedy series Bloods.

=== Audio ===
Horrocks' voiceovers have been used on the films Chicken Run, Christmas Carol: The Movie, Corpse Bride, Garfield: A Tail of Two Kitties, and Tinker Bell. She also did the voiceover of Fenchurch on radio and in the audio adaptation of Douglas Adams' science fiction series The Hitchhiker's Guide to the Galaxy for BBC Radio 4. She has voiced Donner in all three Robbie the Reindeer films in aid of Comic Relief.

In 2000, Horrocks made the CD Further Adventures of Little Voice, again singing in the style of favourite divas. The recording includes duets with Ewan McGregor, Robbie Williams and Dean Martin. Horrocks collaborated once more with Robbie Williams the following year, for a cover of the Bobby Darin song "Things" on Williams' album Swing When You're Winning.

== Personal life ==
Horrocks has two children with her former partner, playwright Nick Vivian. They were together for 21 years, separating in 2017. She currently lives in Brighton.

She was previously in a relationship with director Sam Mendes. She was in a relationship with the singer and actor Ian Dury, about whom she devised the 2022 drama, Love Pants: Ian Dury & Jane Horrocks, for BBC Radio 4, based on her own diary entries and his love letters to her during their one-year relationship in the 1980s when she was 23. They remained friends until his death in 2000.

== Filmography ==
=== Film ===
Year	Title	Role	Directed by
1988	The Dressmaker	Rita	Jim O'Brien
1989	Getting It Right	Jenny	Randal Kleiser
1989	The Wolves of Willoughby Chase	Pattern	Stuart Orme
1990	The Witches	Miss Susan Irvine	Nicolas Roeg
1990	Memphis Belle	Faith	Michael Caton-Jones
1990	Life Is Sweet	Nicola	Mike Leigh
1993	Second Best	Debbie	Chris Menges
1994	Deadly Advice	Jodie Greenwood	Mandie Fletcher
1997	Bring Me the Head of Mavis Davis	Mavis Davis / Marla Dorland	John Henderson
1998	Little Voice	Laura "LV" Hoff	Mark Herman
1999	Faeries	Huccaby (voice)	Gary Hurst
1999	Hooves of Fire	Donner (voice)	
2000	Chicken Run	Babs (voice)	Peter Lord & Nick Park
2000	Born Romantic	Maureen "Mo" Docherty	David Kane
2000	Lion of Oz	Wimsik (voice)	Tim Deacon
2001	Christmas Carol: The Movie	Ghost of Christmas Past (voice)	Jimmy T. Murakami
2002	Legend of the Lost Tribe	Donner (voice)	
2005	Corpse Bride	The Black Widow / Mrs. Plum (voice)	Tim Burton
2005	Brothers of the Head	Roberta Howe	Keith Fulton & Louis Pepe
2006	Garfield: A Tail of Two Kitties	Meenie (voice)	Tim Hill
2007	Close Encounters of the Herd Kind	Donner (voice)	
2008	Tinker Bell	Fairy Mary (voice)	Bradley Raymond
2009	Tinker Bell and the Lost Treasure	Fairy Mary (voice)	Klay Hall
2010	No One Gets Off in This Town		
2011	Arthur Christmas	Lead Elf (voice)	Sarah Smith
2012	Secret of the Wings	Fairy Mary (voice)	Bobs Gannaway & Peggy Holmes
2013	Sunshine on Leith	Jean Henshaw	Dexter Fletcher
2014	The Pirate Fairy	Fairy Mary (voice)	Peggy Holmes
2016	Absolutely Fabulous: The Movie	Bubble/Shirley Bassey impersonator	Mandie Fletcher
2018	Swimming with Men	Heather Scott	Oliver Parker
2023	Chicken Run: Dawn of the Nugget	Babs (voice)	Sam Fell

=== Television series ===
Year	Title	Role	Notes
1987	First Sight	Natalie	Episode: "Leaving Home" (1.3)
1987	ScreenPlay	Louise	Episode: "The Road" (2.13)
1988	The Storyteller	Anja	Episode: "The True Bride" (1.9)
1988	The Ruth Rendell Mysteries	Pippa Bond	Episode: "No Crying He Makes" (2.7)
1989	The Jim Henson Hour	Anja	Episode: "Musicians" (1.8)
1989	Victoria Wood	Cathy Warburton	Episode: "We'd Quite Like to Apologise" (1.4)
1989	Smith & Jones		Episode: "The Unprepared Version" (5.6)
1990	Boon	Trisha Downey	Episode: "Best Left Buried" (5.11)
1991	Screen One	Gail	Episode: "Alive and Kicking" (3.7)
1991	Performance		Episode: "Nona" (1.2)
1992	Red Dwarf	Nirvanah Crane	Episode: "Holoship" (5.1)
1992	ScreenPlay	Maggie Hunt	Episode: "Bad Girl" (7.3)
1992	Performance		Episode: "Roots" (2.3)
1992–2012	Absolutely Fabulous	Bubble (also played Katy Grin, Lola and radio voice)	33 episodes
1995	Performance	Doll Tearsheet	Episode: "Henry IV" (5.5)
1995–1998	Crapston Villas	Flossie	20 episodes (all episodes)
1996	Tales from the Crypt	Cammy	Episode: "Cold War" (7.6)
1996	Never Mind the Horrocks	Various roles	
1997	Wyrd Sisters	Magrat Garlick (voice)	Television mini-series
1997	The Blobs	Various (voice)	26 Episodes (all episodes)
1997–1999	The Forgotten Toys	Various roles (voice)	
1999	Foxbusters	Jeffries (voice)	26 Episodes (all episodes)
1999–2000	Watership Down	Hannah	14 episodes
2000	Mirrorball	Yitta Hilberstam	Television pilot
2000	Spot the Dog	Narrator	26 Episodes were re-narrated over the originals that were done by Paul Nicholas.
2001	Little Big Mouth	Krystan (voice)	
2002	Linda Green	Teresa Franklin	Episode: "Teresa" (2.2)
2003–2004	Wide-Eye	Flea (voice); Baby Komodo (voice); Natterjack Toads (voices)	26 episodes (All episodes)
2004	Monkey Trousers	Various roles	
2005	Jericho	Sadie Swettenham	Episode: "To Murder and Create" (1.3)
2005–2010	Fifi and the Flowertots	Fifi Forget-Me-Not and Primrose (UK/US voice)	40 episodes
2006	The Street	Angela Quinn	Episodes: "The Accident" (1.1) "Stan" (1.2)
2006	The Amazing Mrs Pritchard	Ros Pritchard	6 episodes (all episodes)
2006–2020	Little Princess	Little Princess (voice)	
2011	Coming Up	Felicity	Episode: "Magic" (6.5)
2011	Phineas and Ferb	Eliza (voice)	Episode: "My Fair Goalie" (3.11)
2011	This is Jinsy	Mrs. Stenton	Episode: "Vel" (1.6)
2011	Little Crackers	Hairdresser	Episode: "Jane Horrocks' Little Cracker: Barbara" (2.3)
2011	Pixie Hollow Games	Fairy Mary (voice)	Television special
2011–2013, 2015	Trollied	Julie Cook	37 episodes
2012	Get Your House in Order	Narrator (voice)	Episode: "Stuart" (1.3)
2012	True Love	Sandra	Episode: "Sandra" (1.4)
2014	Lily's Driftwood Bay	Wee Rabbit	
2015	Inside No. 9	Liz	"Cold Comfort" (2.4)
2015	Long Live the Royals	Queen Elenor (voice)	UK version only
2015–2018	Teletubbies	Tubby Phone (voice)	Darrall MacQueen, DHX Media and CBeebies
2019-present	The Rubbish World of Dave Spud	Gran Spud (voice)	Except "Two Toots Spud", "An Honest Face" and "Night School"
2020	The Singapore Grip	Sylvia Blackett	TV series
2021	Hugo the Jungle Animal	Baby Hugo	Episode: "Baby Hugo"
2021–2022	Bloods	Wendy	Main role
2023	COBRA	Victoria Dalton (series 3)	
2025	Here We Go	Ethel Ticehurst	Episode: "Granny's Uno Hustle"
2025	RuPaul's Drag Race UK	Herself (Guest judge)	Series 7
2026	Death Valley	Polly Trevor	Series 2, Episode 1
2026	The Gentlemen	The Bishop of Sussex	Episode: "The Bigger Picture"
2026	The Split Up	Tash Edwards	Episode 1

=== Television films ===
Year	Title	Role	Notes
1989	The Fifteen Streets	Christine Bracken	
1989	Heartland	Pam	
1991	Came Out, It Rained, Went Back in Again	Learner Lesbian	
1993	Cabaret	Sally Bowles	
1994	Self Catering	Marilyn	
1994	Suffer the Little Children	Deborah Hayes	
1995	Some Kind of Life	Alison	
1996	Nightlife	Helen	
1999	Hunting Venus	Cassandra	
1999	The Flint Street Nativity	Zoe	
2009	Gracie!	Gracie Fields	
2010	The Road to Coronation Street	Margaret Morris	

=== Short film, television and video ===
Year	Title	Role	Notes
1994	Butter	Beggar	Television
1995	Combination Skin	(voice)	Short film
1999	Hooves of Fire	Donner (voice)	Television
2002	Legend of the Lost Tribe	Donner / Arctic Fox (voice)	Television
2002	Last Rumba in Rochdale	Gran (voice)	Short film
2004	Wheeling Dealing	Authentic Newsreader	Short film
2006	Voices from the Underworld	Herself (voice)	Video Short
2007	Robbie the Reindeer in Close Encounters of the Herd Kind	Donner (voice)	Television
2011	The Itch of the Golden Nit	(voice)	Short film

=== Audio CDs ===
Year	Title	Role	Notes
1999	Crackers in Space	Wendolene	

=== Music videos ===
- New Order - "1963" (1995)

== Awards and honours ==
- Los Angeles Film Critics Association Awards (1991): Won Award for Best Supporting Actress for Life Is Sweet (1991).
- National Society of Film Critics Awards (1992): Won Award for Best Supporting Actress for Life Is Sweet.
- Sitges - Catalan International Film Festival (1994): Won Best Actress Award for Deadly Advice (1994).
- BAFTA Awards (1999): Nomination for Best Performance by an Actress in a Leading Role for Little Voice (1998).
- British Independent Film Awards (1999): Nomination for Best Actress for Little Voice (1998).
- Chicago Film Critics Association Awards (1999): Nomination for Best Actress for Little Voice (1998).
- Golden Globes (1999): Nomination for Best Performance by an Actress in a Motion Picture - Musical or Comedy, for Little Voice (1998).
- Satellite Awards (1999): Nomination for Best Performance by an Actress in a Motion Picture - Comedy or Musical for Little Voice (1998).
- Screen Actors Guild Awards (1999): Nomination for Outstanding Performance by a Cast, for Little Voice (1998), shared with Annette Badland, Brenda Blethyn, Jim Broadbent, Michael Caine, Philip Jackson and Ewan McGregor.
- Screen Actors Guild Awards (1999): Nomination for Outstanding Performance by a Female Actor in a Leading Role for Little Voice (1998).
