= Omar Hamdi =

Omar Hamdi may refer to:

- Omar Hamdi (artist)
- Omar Hamdi (comedian)
