= Deadly Advice =

- DVD cover
- Directed by: Mandie Fletcher
- Screenplay by: Glenn Chandler
- Produced by: Nigel Stafford-Clark
- Starring: Jane Horrocks; Brenda Fricker; Imelda Staunton
- Cinematography: Richard Greatrex
- Edited by: John Jarvis
- Music by: Richard Harvey
- Production companies: Zenith Productions; Mayfair Entertainment International
- Distributed by: Curzon Film Distributors (UK)
- Release date: 29 April 1994 (UK)
- Running time: 91 minutes
- Country: United Kingdom
- Language: English

Deadly Advice is a 1994 British comedy drama film directed by Mandie Fletcher and starring Jane Horrocks, Brenda Fricker and Edward Woodward.

== Plot ==
The daughters of a domineering mother aspire to break free of her control and form romantic attachments.

== Cast ==
- Jane Horrocks ... Jodie Greenwood
- Brenda Fricker ... Iris Greenwood
- Imelda Staunton ... Beth Greenwood
- Jonathan Pryce ... Dr. Ted Philips
- Edward Woodward ... Maj. Herbert Armstrong
- Billie Whitelaw ... Kate Webster
- Hywel Bennett ... Dr. Crippen
- Jonathan Hyde ... George Joseph Smith
- John Mills ... Jack the Ripper
- Ian Abbey ... Bunny
- Eleanor Bron ... Judge
- Roger Frost ... Rev. Horace Cotton
- Gareth Gwyn-Jones ... Mr. Smethurst
- Richard Moore ... Constable Dickman
- Alice Burrows ... Joyce Cream

== Release ==
The film opened on 29 April 1994 on 139 screens in the United Kingdom and grossed £89,259 in its opening weekend, finishing in tenth place at the UK box office.
