= In and Out of the Kitchen (TV series) =

British comedy television series

- Genre: Comedy
- Based on: In and Out of the Kitchen
- Written by: Miles Jupp
- Directed by: Mandie Fletcher
- Starring: Miles Jupp; Justin Edwards
- Country of origin: United Kingdom
- Original language: English
- No. of series: 1
- No. of episodes: 3

Production
- Executive producer: Gareth Edwards
- Producer: Sam Michell
- Running time: 30 minutes
- Production company: BBC Comedy

Original release
- Network: BBC Four; BBC Four HD
- Release: 11 March – 25 March 2015

In and Out of the Kitchen is a British comedy television series first broadcast on BBC Four in 2015. The three-part series, written by Miles Jupp, was based on In and Out of the Kitchen on BBC Radio 4. The production company behind the series is BBC Comedy.

A pilot episode, directed by Mandie Fletcher, was created for BBC Two in 2013.

The series was cancelled after three episodes

== Cast ==
- Miles Jupp as Damien Trench, a cookery writer
- Justin Edwards as Anthony

== Episodes ==
| No. | Title | Directed by | Written by | Original release date |
|---|---|---|---|---|
| 1 | "The Diet" | Mandie Fletcher | Miles Jupp | 11 March 2015 |
| 2 | "Valentine's Day" | Mandie Fletcher | Miles Jupp | 18 March 2015 |
| 3 | "The Lodger" | Mandie Fletcher | Miles Jupp | 25 March 2015 |
