= Absolutely Fabulous: The Movie =

2016 film by Mandie Fletcher

- Theatrical release poster
- Directed by: Mandie Fletcher
- Written by: Jennifer Saunders
- Based on: Absolutely Fabulous by Jennifer Saunders
- Produced by: Damian Jones; Jon Plowman
- Starring: Jennifer Saunders; Joanna Lumley; Julia Sawalha; Jane Horrocks; June Whitfield; Chris Colfer; Kate Moss; Lulu; Emma Bunton; Robert Webb; Barry Humphries
- Cinematography: Chris Goodger
- Edited by: Anthony Boys; Gavin Buckley
- Music by: Jake Monaco
- Production companies: Fox Searchlight Pictures; BBC Films; DJ Films; Saunders & French Productions
- Distributed by: 20th Century Fox (United Kingdom); Fox Searchlight Pictures (United States)
- Release dates: 29 June 2016 (London); 1 July 2016 (United Kingdom); 22 July 2016 (United States)
- Running time: 91 minutes
- Countries: United Kingdom; United States
- Languages: English; French
- Box office: $39.2 million

Absolutely Fabulous: The Movie is a 2016 comedy film directed by Mandie Fletcher, written by Jennifer Saunders and based on the television series Absolutely Fabulous. It stars Saunders, Joanna Lumley, Julia Sawalha, June Whitfield (in her final acting role) and Jane Horrocks, reprising their roles from the series. The film finds the drug-addicted, alcoholic PR agent Edina Monsoon and her best friend/codependent Patsy Stone on the run from the authorities after it is suspected they killed supermodel Kate Moss. The film serves as a de facto series finale for the show.

Principal photography began on 12 October 2015 in London, with additional filming in the South of France. The film premiered in London on 29 June 2016 and was released theatrically in the United Kingdom on 1 July 2016 by 20th Century Fox and in the United States on 22 July 2016 by Fox Searchlight Pictures. In addition to being the final role for Whitfield, it also marked the final film role for Barry Humphries before his death in April 2023.

== Plot ==
The ever-glamorous and self-indulgent Edina Monsoon and Patsy Stone are now in their 60s. Edina's PR company is in decline and her attempt to release an autobiography falls through when a publisher rejects the manuscript. While setting up designer Huki Muki's fashion event, Patsy learns that supermodel Kate Moss is looking for a new PR agent, and immediately calls Edina to inform her. Their phone call is overheard by Edina's PR rival Claudia Bing when Edina accidentally leaves her phone on speaker.

Edina and Patsy attend the fashion event with Edina's 13-year-old granddaughter Jane (whom Edina calls "Lola"), while Saffron "Saffy" Monsoon, Edina's daughter and Jane's mother, goes on a date with her new boyfriend Nick. Edina finds Kate Moss on a balcony overlooking the Thames. When both Edina and Claudia attempt to approach Kate, Edina accidentally topples Kate into the river. Among the witnesses is Lulu, one of Edina's remaining clients, who is at odds with Edina after being replaced as a performer at the event.

Hysteria pervades the event as Kate is presumed dead. The media immediately storm the scene to report her disappearance and assumed death. Edina and Patsy, along with Jane, are taken into police custody. Saffy arrives to see them with Nick, who is revealed to be a police detective.

After being released the following day, Edina becomes the target of hate mail and Internet trolls, while Patsy has been fired from her job because of her association with Edina. At night, the pair take a boat to the Thames to search for Kate's body, using Edina's personal assistant Bubble as a searching device, but she disappears into the water. They decide to flee the country before the media firestorm worsens, taking Jane and her credit card along. The three land in Cannes, while back in London, Saffy desperately searches for Jane, eventually discovering Edina's whereabouts through her stylist, Christopher.

In Cannes, Edina and Patsy try to devise money-making schemes. After Patsy fails to convince a wealthy former lover to marry her, the two happen upon an elderly baroness who is the richest woman in the world. In order to gain access to her fortune, Patsy disguises herself as a man named Pat Stone and flirts with her. The following day, Patsy marries the baroness, granting Edina and Patsy the lavish lifestyle they had been pursuing, as they stay in a luxury hotel with Dame Joan Collins and Dame Edna Everage as fellow guests.

Meanwhile, Emma Bunton, who saw Edina and Patsy in public, tells Lulu about their whereabouts. Lulu flies out to Cannes and meets with Bubble, who is alive and has bought a massive Cannes pavilion after embezzling money from Edina's company for years. Saffy arrives in Cannes with Nick and immediately heads to the hotel to find Jane, who is with Emma.

A vengeful Lulu reports Edina and Patsy's location to the police. The police find Edina and Patsy and chase them through the town, the duo escaping in a hijacked three-wheeled delivery van. As they reach Bubble's pavilion, the van's brakes fail and they roll backwards and fall into an infinity pool attached to Bubble's house. Saffy arrives at the scene to find Edina and Patsy slowly sinking into the pool, still inside the van. Edina apologises to Saffy for being greedy, self-centred and a neglectful mother. In response, Saffy tells her that she loves her. When Bubble reveals that Kate Moss is alive, Edina immediately exits the van, realising she is innocent.

People all over the world celebrate the fact that Kate Moss is alive. As Kate's new PR, Edina revitalises her own career and finally launches her autobiography, while Kate has been in even more demand since she was found. At Saffy's insistence, Patsy reluctantly reveals to the baroness that she is in fact a woman, not a man called Pat. The baroness, in turn, reveals that she is actually a man.

== Cast ==
- Jennifer Saunders as Edina "Eddy" Monsoon
- Joanna Lumley as Patsy Stone
- Julia Sawalha as Saffron "Saffy" Monsoon
- June Whitfield as Mother
- Jane Horrocks as Bubble and Shirley Bassey impersonator
- Chris Colfer as Christopher
- Indeyarna Donaldson-Holness as Jane "Lola" Johnson
- Christopher Ryan as Marshall Turtle
- Mo Gaffney as Bo Chrysalis Turtle
- Kathy Burke as Magda
- Helen Lederer as Catriona
- Harriet Thorpe as Fleur
- Celia Imrie as Claudia Bing
- Robert Webb as Nick
- Marcia Warren as Lubliana
- Barry Humphries as Charlie
- Lulu as herself
- Emma Bunton as herself
- Kate Moss as herself
- Wanda Ventham as Violet
- Janette Tough as Huki Muki
- Mark Gatiss as Joel
- Llewella Gideon as Llewella

=== Celebrity cameos ===
Multiple celebrity cameo appearances in the film were announced over the course of filming. In April 2016, Fox and the BBC confirmed a list of 60 cameos, most of which had not yet been announced, that would be featured in the film. They include:

- Richard Arnold
- Christopher Biggins
- Ozwald Boateng
- Judith Chalmers
- Gwendoline Christie
- Alexa Chung
- Abbey Clancy
- Rylan Clark-Neal as flight attendant
- Joan Collins
- Lily Cole as herself
- Giles Deacon
- Cara Delevingne
- Poppy Delevingne
- Alice Dellal
- Alesha Dixon
- Jourdan Dunn
- Beattie Edmondson as Claudia's assistant
- Ella Eyre
- Foxes
- Dawn French as Talk Show Host
- Sadie Frost
- Jean Paul Gaultier
- Nick Grimshaw
- Orla Guerin
- Jerry Hall
- Jon Hamm
- Jodie Harsh
- Perez Hilton
- Anya Hindmarch
- Pam Hogg
- Kelly Hoppen
- Dame Edna Everage (Barry Humphries)
- Jocelyn Jee Esien as Nigerian TV Presenter
- Alex Jones
- La Roux
- Jamie Laing
- Kathy Lette
- Daisy Lowe
- Stella McCartney
- Suzy Menkes
- Nick Mohammed as Caspar
- Graham Norton
- Miquita Oliver
- Jade Parfitt
- Jeremy Paxman
- Sophie Raworth
- Camilla Rutherford
- Brix Smith
- Lara Stone
- Tinie Tempah
- Bruno Tonioli
- Suki Waterhouse
- Kirsty Wark
- Rebel Wilson as flight attendant

Approximately 90 drag queens appeared in the film, including La Voix (drag queen), Daniel Lismore, The Vivienne and Charlie Hides.

== Production ==
=== Development ===
Saunders wrote and starred in Absolutely Fabulous, a British television sitcom for the BBC, which originally ran for three series from 1992 to 1995, with intermittent additional series and specials until 2012. Absolutely Fabulous features the champagne-fuelled duo of "international PR guru" Edina Monsoon (Saunders) and "sex-crazed magazine editor" Patsy Stone (Lumley). Additional characters include Edina's overly serious daughter Saffron (Sawalha), her daffy mother (Whitfield) and her even daffier assistant Bubble (Horrocks).

=== Writing ===
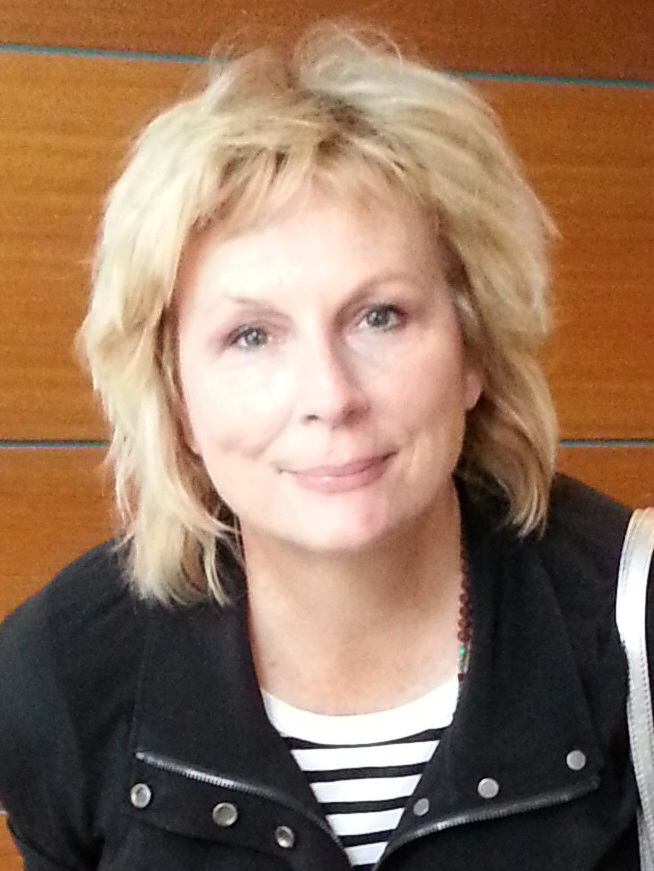
Saunders planned to begin writing a film version of the series in 2012 and confirmed that she had begun the writing process in 2014.

Deadline Hollywood broke the story in November 2011 that Saunders planned to begin writing a film version of the series in 2012. The film would begin with Edina and Patsy waking up hungover after a party on an oligarch's yacht, with everyone else gone and the boat somewhere the middle of the ocean. Saunders later said that she hoped to shoot the film on the French Riviera. In March 2012, Saunders confirmed that she was working on the script. She said of the plot: "Eddy and Patsy are looking for what they imagine glamorous life should be. They're constantly searching for that perfect place to sit or that perfect pair of sunglasses. It's Shangri-La and it just might be round the next corner. In the meantime, they decide to take Saffy's daughter off her—she calls her Jane, I call her Lola—but then they lose her."

Calling herself the "worst procrastinator in the world", Saunders said in January 2014: "Yes, well I have to do it now because I've threatened to a lot ... And then she [Lumley] kept announcing it and saying, "Yes, she's going to do it," and then Dawn French on our radio show at Christmas said, "I bet £100,000 that you don't write it," so now I have to write it, otherwise I have to pay her £100,000 ... Once you've had a bit of success, the last thing you want to do is go and make a flop. So the biggest fear in me is that it won't be good enough. I'm really nervous about it."

In April 2014, Saunders again confirmed on BBC Breakfast that she was in the process of writing the film. In April 2015, Saunders explained her delay with the script, saying, "I think that's why I didn't do it for a while ... I thought, 'Wouldn't it be awful if it was awful.'" She then quipped, "but we're all so old, and Joanna [Lumley] said to me, 'Do it before we die!' We're all on the brink." Saunders also noted, "[The film] involves all the main characters and virtually everyone that's ever been in the series—all those characters". Lumley confirmed in July 2015 that the film's script was finished and that production would begin in October. She said of the project, "We are all there, the same old gang ... It is going to be ravishingly funny! Very gorgeous ... and completely fabulous!"

=== Filming ===
In August 2015, Deadline Hollywood reported that "all of the original main cast" were confirmed, with Fox Searchlight Pictures in negotiations to co-finance and co-produce the film with BBC Films, and to handle worldwide distribution. It was also announced that Mandie Fletcher would direct, with Jon Plowman and Damian Jones as producers and Saunders, French and Maureen Vincent as executive producers. Deadline Hollywood later reported that Christine Langan, Steve Milne, Christian Eisenbeiss and Nichola Martin were also executive producing, with DanTram Nguyen, Vice President of Production and Katie Goodson-Thomas, Director of Production overseeing the project for Fox Searchlight Pictures.

Principal photography began on 12 October 2015 in London. Additional filming took place in the South of France, with locations including the Hôtel Martinez in Cannes, the Grand-Hôtel du Cap-Ferrat in Saint-Jean-Cap-Ferrat, the Palais Bulles in Théoule-sur-Mer, and Villefranche-sur-Mer.

The BBC and Fox Searchlight subsequently released a promotional image of Saunders and Lumley in character on a yacht. Along with Sawalha, Whitfield and Horrocks, Kathy Burke was confirmed to be reprising her role as Magda, and Kate Moss, Emma Bunton and Lulu would appear in guest roles as themselves, as they had in the TV series. The cameo appearances of Harry Styles, Kelly Hoppen and Kim Kardashian were also announced as filming began. Multiple other celebrity cameos were announced during production, culminating with a 60-name list released in April 2016.

=== Music ===
On 10 June 2016, Australian singer Kylie Minogue released a cover version of the series' theme song "This Wheel's on Fire" as the official theme for the film. The soundtrack, which also includes songs from Paloma Faith (whose "Ready for the Good Life" appears in the film's trailer), La Roux, Jason Derulo, Eartha Kitt, Nancy Sinatra, Santigold and others, was released on 1 July 2016 via Rhino Records. It reached number 49 on the UK Compilation Chart and number 38 on the ARIA Albums Chart in Australia.

== Release ==
Absolutely Fabulous: The Movie had its world premiere at the Odeon Leicester Square in London on 29 June 2016. The film was released theatrically in the United Kingdom on 1 July 2016 by 20th Century Fox, and was subsequently released in the UK on DVD and Blu-ray on 5 December 2016. In the United States, it was released in select theaters on 22 July 2016 by Fox Searchlight Pictures.

== Reception ==
=== Box office ===
Absolutely Fabulous: The Movie grossed $39.2 million worldwide, including $19.5 million in the United Kingdom, $4.7 million in the United States and $6.2 million in Australia.

=== Critical response ===
On the review aggregator website Rotten Tomatoes, the film holds an approval rating of 57% based on 153 reviews, with an average rating of 5.5/10. The website's critics consensus reads, "Absolutely Fabulous: The Movie picks up pretty much where its source material left off, delivering an adaptation that, as fans of this British export might say, does what it says on the tin." On Metacritic, the film has a score of 59 out of 100 based on 35 critics, indicating "mixed or average" reviews.

=== Accolades ===
Year	Association	Category	Nominee(s)	Result	Ref.
2017	AAPR Movies for Grownups Awards	Best Buddy Picture	Jennifer Saunders, Joanna Lumley	Won	
2017	AAPR Movies for Grownups Awards	Best Comedy/Musical	Absolutely Fabulous: The Movie	Nominated	
2017	British Screenwriters’ Awards	Best British Feature Film Writing	Jennifer Saunders	Nominated	
2017	Casting Directors Association	Best Casting of a Feature Film & Drama	Camilla Arthur	Nominated	
2017	Costume Designers Guild	Excellence in Contemporary Film	Rebecca Hale	Nominated	
2017	Diversity in Media Awards	Movie of the Year	Absolutely Fabulous: The Movie	Nominated	
2017	Dorian Awards	Campy Film of the Year	Absolutely Fabulous: The Movie	Nominated	
2017	Golden Trailer Awards	Best Foreign Comedy Trailer	Absolutely Fabulous: The Movie	Nominated	
2017	National Film Awards UK				
2017	National Film Awards UK	Best Comedy	Absolutely Fabulous: The Movie	Nominated	
2017	National Film Awards UK	Best Director	Mandie Fletcher	Nominated	
2017	National Film Awards UK	Best Actress	Jennifer Saunders	Nominated	
2017	National Film Awards UK	Best Supporting Actress	Joanna Lumley	Nominated	

== Casting controversy ==
In December 2015, the film sparked controversy and accusations of racism when it was announced that white Scottish comedian Janette Tough would be playing a Japanese character named Huki Muki. Korean-American comedian Margaret Cho accused the film of "yellowface", which she described as "when white people portray Asian people. And unfortunately it's happening in this film."

Upon release, it became apparent that the character was not, in fact, Japanese but Scottish. When asked about the controversy, Saunders replied that "the whole film is about people being what they're not, Huki Muki is a brand, she is the designer and she looks a bit Japanese, but the moment she opens her mouth she's from Glasgow. There's no yellow makeup..."

== Cancelled sequel ==
Saunders had at one point hinted that a sequel would be considered if the film performed well at the box office. However, on 29 November 2016, Saunders confirmed that she is "not doing anything more with Ab Fab", as she wants to focus on new projects and spend more time with her family.
