= The Million Pound Motors =

- Genre: Documentary
- Directed by: Rachael Kinley
- Starring: Adam Stott, Richard Biddulph
- Country of origin: United Kingdom
- No. of series: 1

Production
- Producers: Jayne Edwards, Guy Gilbert
- Running time: 51 mins
- Production company: Off the Fence

Original release
- Network: Channel 4
- Release: 7 December 2015

The Million Pound Motors is a British Television show starring Miles Jupp, Tom Hartley, Adam Stott, Richard Biddulph and Sheik Amari. The program is directed by Rachael Kinley. The first episode was aired on 7 December 2015. The airing network is Channel 4.

The program is created and produced by Jayne Edwards and Guy Gilbert under production company "Off the Fence".

== Plot ==
The Million Pound Motors is a first cut documentary show where Britains rich and famous men and women meet for selling the high speed luxury vehicles. It includes multimillionaires Tom Hartley, Adam Stott, Amari Supercar.

== Cast ==
- Tom Hartley
- Miles Jupp as narrator
- Richard Biddulph
- Adam Stott
- Sheik Amari
