= Never Mind the Horrocks =

- Written by: Ian Brown; Mark Burton; John O'Farrell; Andy Hamilton; Graham Linehan; Arthur Mathews; Georgia Pritchett; Steve Punt; Pete Sinclair
- Directed by: John Birkin
- Starring: Jane Horrocks; Martin Clunes; Rebecca Front; Mel Giedroyc; David Haig; Philip Pope; Alexander Armstrong; Angela Rippon
- Theme music composer: Philip Pope
- Original language: English

Production
- Producer: Dan Patterson
- Running time: 50 minutes
- Production company: Hat Trick Productions

Original release
- Release: 19 September 1996

Never Mind the Horrocks is a one-off television show built around the talents of British television comedian Jane Horrocks. It was broadcast on Channel 4 on Thursday 19 September 1996 and also starred Martin Clunes, Mel Giedroyc, Rebecca Front, David Haig, Alexander Armstrong, and Philip Pope, with a special guest appearance by Angela Rippon. Its name is a pun on the Sex Pistols album Never Mind the Bollocks.
