= Gracie! (2009 film) =

2009 television film

- Written by: Nick Vivian
- Directed by: Brian Percival
- Starring: Jane Horrocks; Tom Hollander
- Composer: Rob Lane
- Country of origin: United Kingdom
- Original languages: English; Italian

Production
- Producer: Janet Tyler
- Cinematography: David Katznelson
- Editor: Adam Recht
- Running time: 77 minutes
- Production company: BBC Studios Productions

Original release
- Release: November 23, 2009

Gracie! is a 2009 biographical television film on the life of Gracie Fields, with Jane Horrocks playing Fields and Tom Hollander her husband Monty Banks. It covers her career before the Second World War and the decline in her popularity during the war.

== Cast ==
- Gracie Fields - Jane Horrocks
- Monty Banks - Tom Hollander
- Harry Parr-Davies, Gracie's accompanist - David Dawson
- Fred Stansfield, Gracie's father - Tony Haygarth
- Jenny Stansfield, Gracie's mother - Ellie Haddington
- Basil Dean - Alistair Petrie

== Awards and nominations ==
Year	Award	Category	Nominee	Result	Ref.
2010	British Academy Television Awards	Best Supporting Actor	Tom Hollander	Nominated	
