= Swots =

2009 BBC comedy radio panel show hosted by Miles Jupp

Swots is a 2009 BBC comedy radio panel show hosted by Miles Jupp. First broadcast on BBC Radio Scotland, it has been repeated on BBC Radio 7. The show is set in a fictional 1960's classroom and involves a series of comedy rounds based loosely on typical classroom activities such as spelling and mathematics. The British Comedy Guide considered it "A very patchy, bizarre series. Some is rather funny; everyone on the panel is clearly having fun and Jupp delivers some good (scripted) gags."
