= Mandie Fletcher =

British television director

- Born: Mandie Elizabeth Fletcher; 27 December 1954 (age 71); United Kingdom
- Occupations: Television director, film director

Mandie Elizabeth Fletcher (born 27 December 1954) is a British television and film director.

Fletcher began her career at the BBC as an assistant floor manager and later production manager on comedy programmes, becoming a director of situation comedy while working on the final series of Butterflies (1983). She followed this with the second (1986) and third (1987) series of Blackadder, for which she won the Best Comedy Series award at the 1988 BAFTAs. She also directed episodes of Only Fools and Horses (1986).

Her debut feature was Deadly Advice (1994). Fletcher has continued to work in television with Hamish Macbeth (1996–1997) and Jam and Jerusalem (2006–2009). Most recently she directed the critically acclaimed BBC 2 series Roger & Val Have Just Got In, which was broadcast in Spring 2012, and starred Dawn French and Alfred Molina. She also directed the latest episodes of Absolutely Fabulous including the Olympic special. In 2013, she directed the pilot episode of In and Out of the Kitchen. In 2016, Fletcher directed Absolutely Fabulous: The Movie.

== Filmography ==
Film

Year	Title
1994	Deadly Advice
2016	Absolutely Fabulous: The Movie
2018	Patrick
Pre-production	Unsuitable Game

TV

Year	Title	Notes
1979-1980	Not the Nine O'Clock News	Production team (Seasons 1 & 2)
1982	Open All Hours	Production manager (Season 3)
1982-1983	Last of the Summer Wine	Production manager (Season 7)
1983	Butterflies	Production manager and director of 2 episodes (Season 4)
1984	The Fainthearted Feminist	
1985	The Mistress	Assistant producer (Season 1)
1985	Barnet	TV Movie
1985	Three Up Two Down	Season 1
1986	Blackadder II	
1986	Only Fools and Horses	4 episodes of Season 5
1986-1987	Brush Strokes	Seasons 1 and 2, also producer on Season 2
1987	Blackadder the Third	
1988	Blackadder: The Cavalier Years	TV short, uncredited
1988	No Frills	Also producer
1989	Desmond's	Season 1
1989	The Stone Age	TV Movie
1989	4 Play	1 episode
1992	Screen One	1 episode
1996	Tales From the Crypt	1 episode
1996-1997	Hamish Macbeth	4 episodes
2006	The Complete Guide to Parenting	
2006-2009	Jam & Jerusalem	
2010	Accidental Farmer	TV Movie
2011	My So Called Life Sentence	TV Movie
2011-2012	Absolutely Fabulous: 20th Anniversary	
2012	Roger & Val Have Just Got In	Season 2
2013	Stella	3 episodes of Season 2
2013	The Ginge, the Geordie and the Geek	TV Mini-series, also producer
2014	Blandings	4 episodes of Season 2
2014-2015	Miranda	Series finale
2015	In and Out of the Kitchen	
