= T. E. B. Clarke =

English screenwriter (1907–1989)

T. E. B. Clarke OBE
- Born: Thomas Ernest Bennett Clarke; 7 June 1907; Watford, Hertfordshire, England, UK
- Died: 11 February 1989 (aged 81); London, England, UK
- Other name: Tibby
- Occupations: Writer, screenwriter
- Years active: 1944–1980
- Spouse: Joyce Caroline Steele (m. 1932; died 1983)
- Relatives: Dudley Clarke (older brother)
- Awards: Academy Award for Best Story and Screenplay; 1952 The Lavender Hill Mob

Thomas Ernest Bennett "Tibby" Clarke OBE (7 June 1907 – 11 February 1989) was an English film screenwriter who wrote several of the Ealing Studios comedies.

== Early life ==
Clarke was born in Watford on 7 June 1907. His father, Ernest Clarke, had been raised in Hull, moving to South Africa in the late 19th century. He was enlisted to carry dispatches for the Jameson Raid though, avoiding imprisonment, managed to obtain a job working for a gold mining company. Ernest then married Madeline Gardiner, with whom he raised three children. Their eldest child was Dudley Clarke, who would later become a pioneer of military deception operations during the Second World War. A girl, Dollie, followed.

The gold mining company Ernest had been working for then offered him an opportunity to move to their London office, enabling him to return to England with his young family. They sailed from South Africa, the first ship to leave the country following the end of the Boer War. Upon arriving in England, Ernest purchased a house in Watford, where Madeline gave birth to their third and final child, Thomas Ernest Bennett Clarke.

Always known as "Tibby", Clarke attended Charterhouse School and Clare College, Cambridge, where he studied law for a year before departing after he was caught impersonating a proctor and booking students for being out after dark without a cap and gown. He then visited Australia, New Zealand, San Francisco, and Canada, returning to England to work as a journalist for, in succession, the Hardware Trade Journal, the weekly magazine Answers, and The Daily Sketch tabloid newspaper. After gaining temporary employment as a publicity officer for the W. S. Crawford Advertising Agency in the late 1920s, he came into contact with the film industry for the first time.

== Film career ==
Clarke's first screen credit was for heavily modifying the script of For Those in Peril in 1944, followed by proper contributions to The Halfway House (1944) and Johnny Frenchman (1945). His scripts always featured careful logical development from a slightly absurd premise to a farcical conclusion. In 1952, he was awarded a Best Original Screenplay Oscar for his script for The Lavender Hill Mob, making him one of just a handful of Britons to receive this award. He continued to work as a scriptwriter after Ealing ceased production, his later contributions including Sons and Lovers and the Disney film The Horse Without a Head.

Clarke was also a novelist and writer of non-fiction, but presented at least one fictional work as fact. His book Murder at Buckingham Palace (1981) purports to tell the story of a hushed-up murder at the Royal residence in 1935. Despite its including 'documentary' photographs, there is no external evidence that the book is anything but pure fiction. For The Blue Lamp (1950) he drew on his experience as a war reserve constable with the Metropolitan Police during the Second World War.

He was appointed Officer of the Order of the British Empire (OBE) in the 1952 New Year Honours. He was the subject of This Is Your Life in 1960 when he was surprised by Eamonn Andrews at the BBC Television Theatre.

== Animal welfare ==
Clarke was an advocate of animal welfare and opposed coursing. He authored A Savage Sport: The Case Against Coursing for the National Society for the Abolition of Cruel Sports in 1935.

== Death ==
Clarke was diagnosed with cancer in 1988. He died at London Bridge Hospital in February, 1989.

== Bibliography ==
=== Screenplays ===
- Johnny Frenchman (1945)
- Hue and Cry (1947)
- Against the Wind (1948)
- Passport to Pimlico (1949)
- The Blue Lamp (1950)
- The Magnet (1950)
- The Lavender Hill Mob (1951)
- The Titfield Thunderbolt (1953)
- The Rainbow Jacket (1954)
- Who Done It? (1956)
- Barnacle Bill (US: All at Sea, 1957)
- Gideon's Day (US: Gideon of Scotland Yard, 1958)
- Sons and Lovers (1960)
- A Man Could Get Killed (1966)
- The Horse Without a Head
- High Rise Donkey (1980)

=== Non-fiction ===
- A Savage Sport: The Case Against Coursing
- Go South - Go West
- What's Yours?
- Intimate Relations
- This is Where I Came In

=== Novels ===
- Jeremy's England
- Cartwright Was a Cad
- Two and Two Make Five
- Mr Spirket Reforms
- The World Was Mine
- The Wide Open Door
- The Trail of the Serpent
- The Wrong Turning
- The Man Who Seduced a Bank
- Murder at Buckingham Palace
- Intimate Relations (ISBN 9780718109271)
