= Nassau Tower =

Railroad signal and interlocking building in New York State

Coordinates: 40°44′27.04″N 73°38′18.58″W

Nassau Tower NASSAU Interlocking
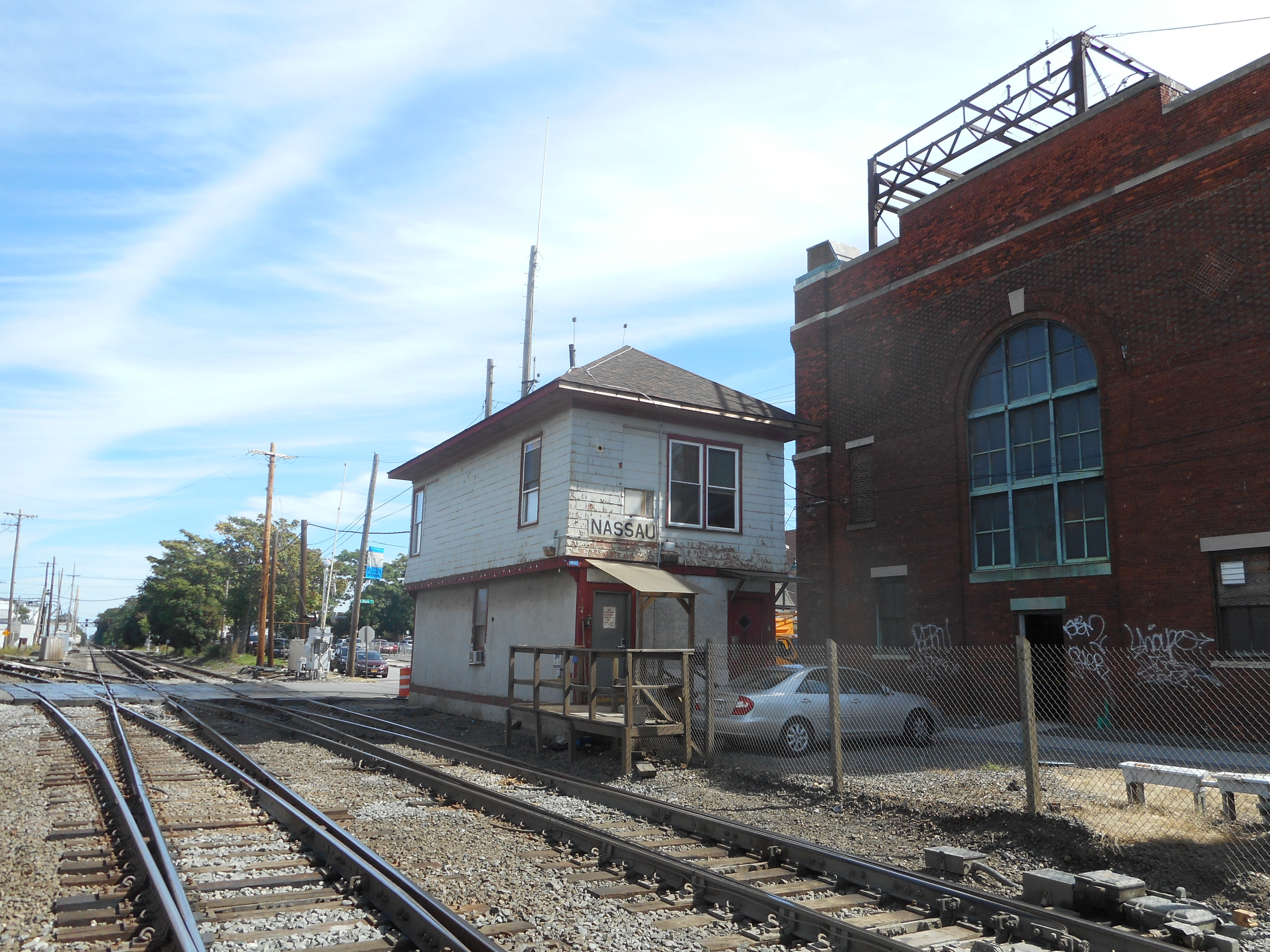
- Nassau Tower, as seen from the Mineola station's former pedestrian grade crossing.
- Interactive map of the Nassau Tower; NASSAU Interlocking area

General information
- Status: Demolished
- Type: Railroad signal and interlocking building
- Location: Mineola, New York, adjacent to the Mineola station, 71 Main Street, Mineola, New York 11501
- Opened: 1923
- Owner: Metropolitan Transportation Authority

Technical details
- Floor count: 2

Nassau Tower was the Long Island Rail Road's interlocking and signal tower for NASSAU Interlocking at Mineola Junction, just east of the Mineola station, from 1923 until 2020. As part of LIRR's Main Line Expansion Project, which added a third track along the Main Line between Floral Park and Hicksville stations, the tower was decommissioned and demolished.

== History ==
=== 20th Century ===
Nassau Tower opened in 1923, located next to the Mineola station and the LIRR's Mineola Electrical Substation, which was built in 1910. This tower replaced the original, brick tower, which was built in 1890 and destroyed in a train wreck on December 31, 1922.

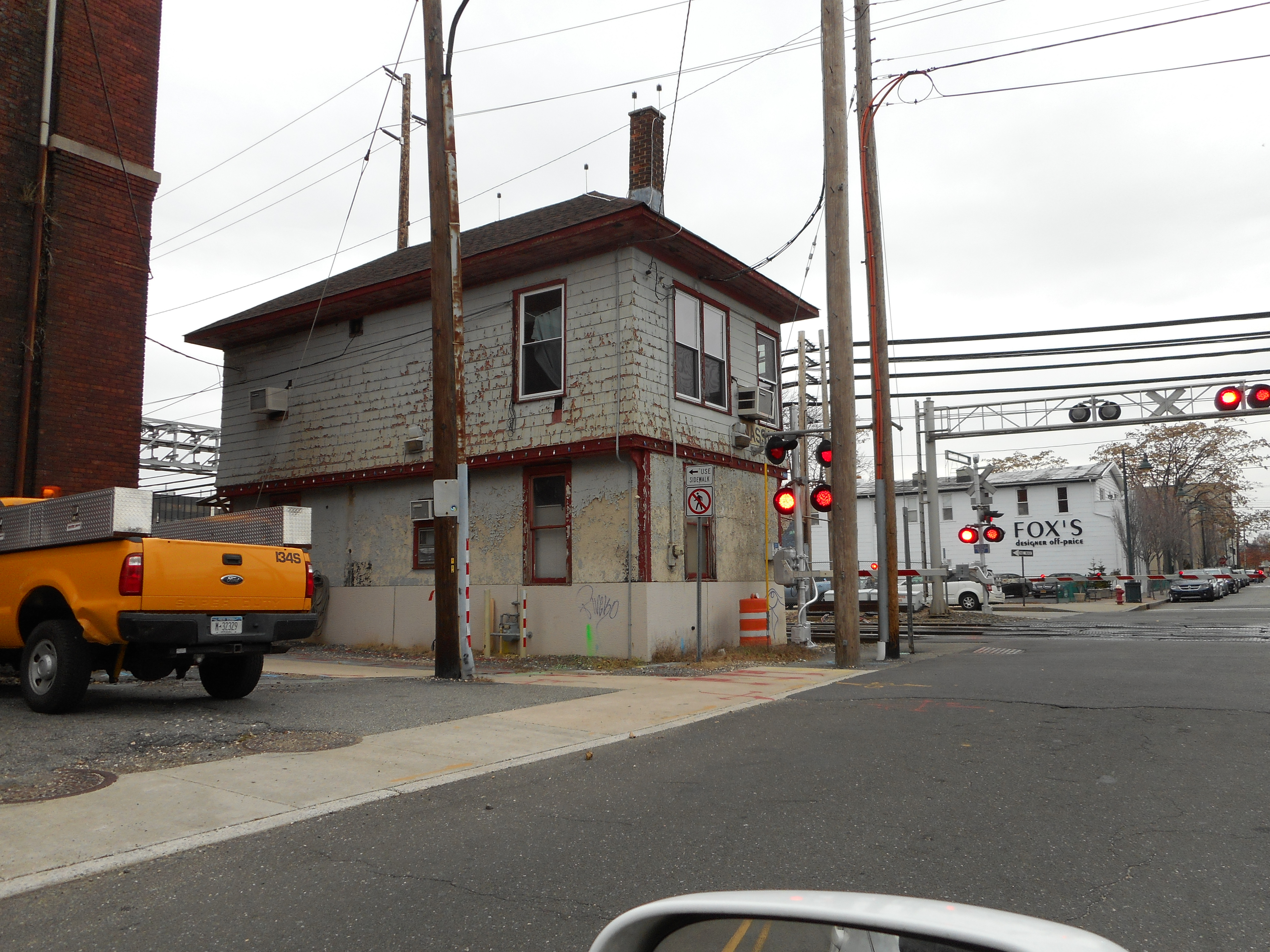
The south side of Nassau Tower, as seen from the Main Street grade crossing prior to the Main Line Expansion Project.

In 1997, the mechanical-type control machines were removed, being replaced with a more modern electronic control panel.

=== 21st Century ===
In the 2010s, it was announced by Governor Andrew M. Cuomo that the main Line would finally receive a third track, after decades of discussions, debates, and proposals. The construction of this expansion would require either demolishing or moving the tower, as the space would be needed for the new track, with the MTA ultimately preferring the former option. As a result, many organizations, including the Mineola Historic Society, the Oyster Bay Railroad Museum, as well as many railroad enthusiasts and locals, tried to preserve the building by having it moved and transformed into the Mineola Railroad Museum, citing an MTA proposal from 2005, the history of the building, and its eligibility for receiving both state and national historic statuses, as well as being considered a local landmark by many in the Mineola community. However, their efforts were unsuccessful.

In 2020, Nassau Tower closed, as NASSAU Interlocking was completely redone and modernized, now being controlled from the Jamaica Control Center, located near Jamaica station. In March 2021, while contractors were demolishing an adjacent electrical substation that had been deactivated, debris fell onto Nassau Tower. The incident caused Nassau Tower's partial collapse and temporarily trapped four workers inside the tower.
