= Alice Burrows =

English silversmith

- Died: 1819
- Occupation: Silversmith

Alice Burrows (died 1819) was an English silversmith.

Burrows was the widow of silversmith George Burrows I, a smallworker, and worked in partnership with her son, George Burrows II. Classed as a plateworker, she registered her first mark, in two sizes, on 10 July 1801. Further marks followed on 7 November 1804, 21 February 1810 and 6 May 1818. Active in London, her address was given as 14 Red Lion Street, Clerkenwell.

Her date of death has been given as 1819 in various sources.

The National Museum of Women in the Arts owns several pieces by Alice and George Burrows, including a George III snuff box of 1802, a George III teapot of 1803, and a Regency teapot of 1816.
