= Phil Porter =

English writer (born 1977)

Phil Porter (born 1977) is a British playwright, librettist and television writer. He is a graduate of the University of Birmingham.

== Plays and libretti ==
Plays and libretti include:

- The Government Inspector (Chichester Festival Theatre, 2025)
- The Company Of Rascals (Yvonne Arnaud Theatre, 2025)
- The Boy With Two Hearts (Wales Millennium Centre 2021, National Theatre 2022)
- Gods Of The Game (Grange Park Opera / Sky Arts, 2022)
- The Lavender Hill Mob (National Tour, 2022, starring Miles Jupp)
- God Of Chaos (Plymouth Theatre Royal, 2019)
- Vice Versa (Royal Shakespeare Company, 2017)
- The Miser (West End, 2017, nominated for an Olivier Award for Best New Comedy, adapted with Sean Foley)
- The Man With The Hammer (Plymouth Theatre Royal, 2016)
- The Christmas Truce (Royal Shakespeare Company, 2014)
- A Mad World My Masters (Royal Shakespeare Company, 2013, adapted with Sean Foley)
- Blink (Traverse & Soho / Nabokov, 2012)
- Beauty And The Beast (Unicorn Theatre, 2010)
- Skitterbang Island (Polka Theatre, 2010)
- Here Lies Mary Spindler (Royal Shakespeare Company / Latitude Festival, 2009)
- Cinderella (Unicorn Theatre, 2009)
- The Flying Machine (Unicorn Theatre, 2008)
- The Cracks In My Skin (Manchester Royal Exchange, 2008, winner of a Bruntwood Award)
- Starseeker (adaptation, Northampton Theatre Royal, 2007)
- Pinocchio (Royal Opera House, 2005)
- The Stonewatcher (translation, National Theatre, 2004)
- Stealing Sweets And Punching People (Theatre 503, 2003)
- Smashed Eggs (Pentabus Theatre, 2002, winner of The Children's Award)
