= Omar Hamdi (media founder) =

British comedian and television host

Omar Hamdi is a British journalist and entrepreneur. He is the founder of Mediatech scale up Pathos Communications.

== Early life ==
Hamdi is a native of Cardiff, Wales. His parents had moved from Egypt to Wales in the 1970s. He got into comedy through an ex-girlfriend, who suggested that he use comedy as an outlet for his energy.

== Early career ==
Hamdi rose to prominence working on the British academy award-winning BBC consumer affairs TV show X-Ray as well as the BBC debate show Free Speech. He also wrote for national newspapers, including The Independent and The Express. His writing also led to a nomination by The Times for Book of the Year.

He writes for newspapers and magazines, and was mentioned in Don't Panic I'm Islamic. For the latter he undertook a stand-up and book tour around the UK, after it was selected as Sunday Times Humour Book of the Year. He has also written and presented on four series of BBC Radio 2’s award-winning show Pause for Thought.

He appeared at major comedy clubs in the UK including The Comedy Store. His stand-up comedy is autobiographical, including varying perspectives on nationality, gender and love, as well as a satirical take on the big issues facing the world.

He began performing stand-up after graduating from Leeds University. He made his TV debut in 2014, performing stand-up on Seann Walsh's late night show. He also starred in the chat show "Free Speech" Hamdi has been involved in the 2017 Super Muslim Comedy Tour.

== Involvement in AI ==
Hamdi says that he ‘was into AI before it was fashionable’, having studied computing at the University of Leeds.

He has led Pathos Communications to develop proprietary AI tools, Pressella and PathosMind.

== Business career ==
Founding Pathos Communications in 2019, Hamdi rapidly grew the company. This led to it being featured on the Nasdaq Tower in Times Square in 2023.

In 2024, it was recognised as the fastest growing professional services firm in the UK by the UBS Fast Growth Index. The following year, Pathos was ranked by the Financial Times as the 33rd fastest growing company in Europe, and the fastest growing advertising and marketing company in the UK.

Later in 2025, Hamdi was recognised by LDC, the private equity arm of Lloyds Banking Group, in the LDC Top 50 ranking of the UK’s most ambitious business leaders.

The same year, Hamdi judged the UK Startup Awards, which were won by Magic AI.

In November 2025, Pathos Communications was ranked by Big Four firm Deloitte as the 6th fastest growing tech firm in the UK in the Deloitte UK Technology Fast 50 At the same awards, Pathos was also ranked as the fastest growing bootstrapped tech firm in the UK.

Hamdi continues to lead Pathos as CEO, including its expansion into Mainland China and Latin America.
