= In and Out of the Kitchen =

BBC radio comedy series

- Genre: Comedy
- Running time: 30 minutes
- Country of origin: United Kingdom
- Language: English
- Home station: BBC Radio 4
- Starring: Miles Jupp; Justin Edwards
- Written by: Miles Jupp
- No. of series: 4
- No. of episodes: 22
- Audio format: Stereophonic sound
- Website: BBC website

In and Out of the Kitchen is a BBC radio comedy written by Miles Jupp. Its first series was broadcast on BBC Radio 4 in 2011. The show revolves around the lives of fussy perfectionist culinary writer Damien Trench (played by Miles Jupp) and his more laid-back partner, Anthony (played by Justin Edwards). It features a mixture of dialogue, Damien's diary entries and a weekly recipe. Although he does not attempt to cook the recipes he writes on behalf of Damien, Jupp has stated that they are "probably...reasonably edible", with the notable exception of "pilchards al limone" and "whatever the hangover cure was from the first episode". A second series was broadcast in 2013 and a third series announced on Jupp's website soon after, along with plans for a TV pilot.

The show was well received by the critics. Writing in the Daily Telegraph, Gillian Reynolds called the series "irresistible", whilst The Independent's Chris Maume said that it was "a delight, beautifully written, and unafraid to bite the hand that feeds it."

A fourth series of In and Out of the Kitchen was broadcast on BBC Radio 4 in August and September 2015.
