= Miles Jupp =

English actor and comedian (born 1979)

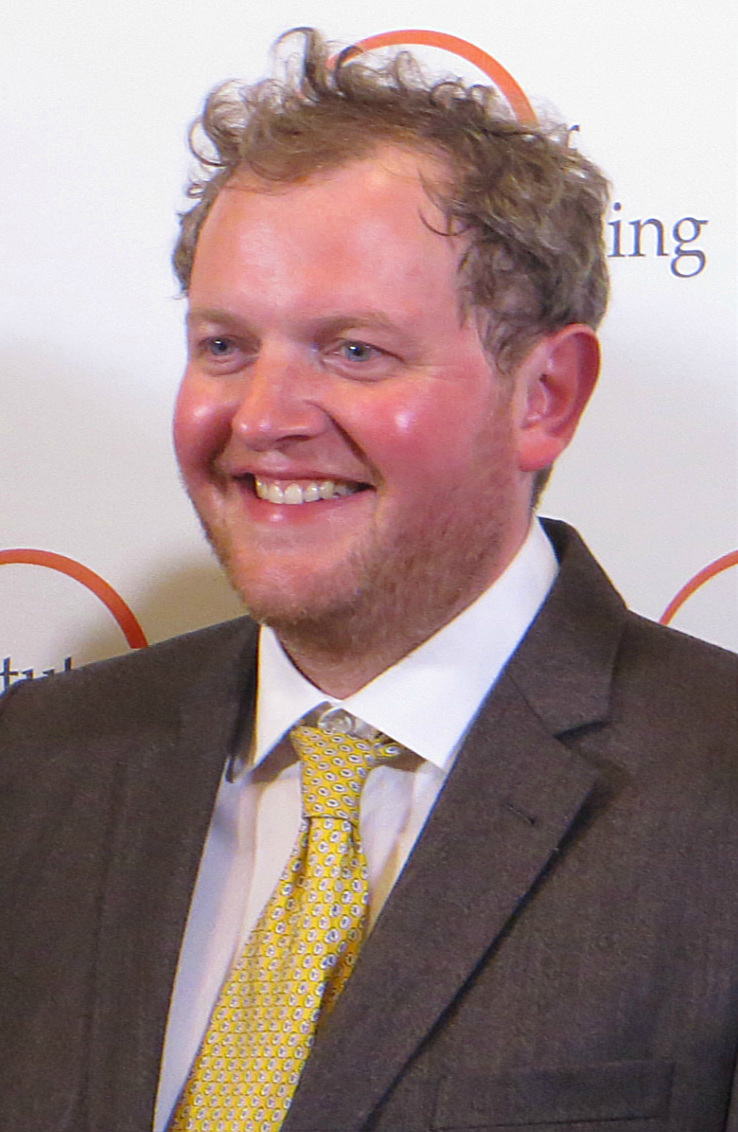
- Jupp in 2017
- Born: Miles Hugh Barrett Jupp; 8 September 1979 (age 47); London, England
- Education: University of Edinburgh (BA)
- Occupations: Actor; comedian
- Years active: 1999–present
- Spouse: Rachel Jupp
- Children: 5
- Miles Jupp's voice Recorded February 2013 from the BBC Radio 4 programme Loose Ends
- Website: milesjupp.co.uk

Miles Hugh Barrett Jupp (born 8 September 1979) is an English actor and comedian. He began his career as a stand-up comedian before playing the role of the inventor Archie in the children's television series Balamory. He also played John Duggan in The Thick of It, Nigel McCall in the sitcom Rev, and appeared on many comedy panel shows. Between 2015 and 2019, Jupp was the host of The News Quiz on BBC Radio 4, replacing Sandi Toksvig.

== Early life ==
Jupp was born in 1979 in London and spent his early childhood in West Hampstead. He is the son of a minister in the United Reformed Church. For much of his life, Jupp believed he was of Belgian stock, descended from 16th-century Huguenot immigrants. However, while creating a programme for BBC Radio 4 in 2015, he discovered his roots are actually in Sussex.

Jupp attended three independent schools: The Hall School in Hampstead, North London; St George's School in Windsor; and Oakham School in Rutland. He studied divinity at the University of Edinburgh. While there, he performed with an improvised comedy troupe, the Improverts, and took part in pantomime productions with the Edinburgh University Theatre Company at Bedlam Theatre.

== Career ==
Jupp won So You Think You're Funny?, Leicester Mercury Comedian of the Year in 2001 and was a Perrier Award Best Newcomer nominee in 2003 for his show Gentlemen Prefer Brogues. During his appearance on Celebrity Mastermind and Test Match Special in 2011, he claimed to have bluffed his way onto an England cricket tour to India as the cricket correspondent for both BBC Scotland and the Western Mail. He subsequently wrote Fibber in the Heat, a memoir about his adventures as a cricket journalist in India.

=== Television and film ===
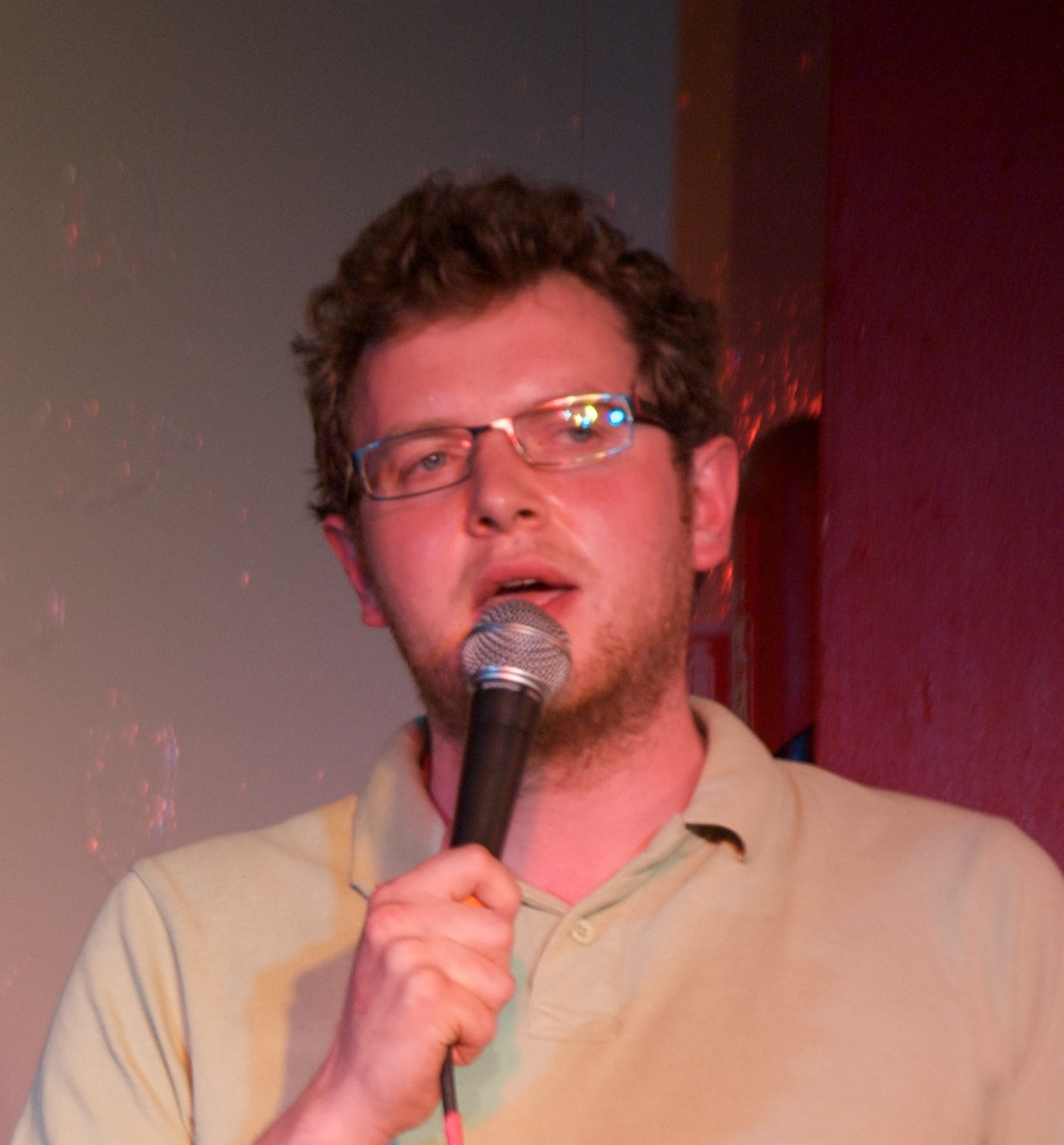
Jupp in 2009

Jupp played Archie, the Inventor in CBeebies' Balamory. He also had a role in the BBC Scotland comedy programme, Live Floor Show, where he played an eccentric, foul-mouthed comedian. In 2007, Jupp appeared fleetingly in Harry Potter and the Order of the Phoenix as a television weatherman who complained about a hot drought.

Jupp appeared in Series 3 and 4 of the political comedy, The Thick of It, as John Duggan, an incompetent press officer with a habit of making inappropriate comments. He appeared in BBC Scotland's comedy Gary: Tank Commander as Captain Fanshaw. In 2009, he appeared briefly in the film Sherlock Holmes as a waiter. In the same year, he also appeared in Stewart Lee's Comedy Vehicle.

In 2010, Jupp appeared on Mock the Week and Michael McIntyre's Comedy Roadshow. He performed as Nigel, a Church of England Lay Reader, in the BBC sitcom Rev. He also appeared as an under-secretary in the film Made in Dagenham (2010).

In January 2011, Jupp was a team member alongside Goldie and Phill Jupitus on the music quiz Never Mind the Buzzcocks. In May 2011, November 2011, and April 2012, he was a panellist on Have I Got News for You and Would I Lie To You? (BBC). On 22 August 2011, he was a lunchtime guest on Test Match Special, where he revealed a love of cricket and that he had previously worked with the Test Match Special team, who had no idea who he was. This became the basis of the book Fibber in the Heat.

In October 2011, he again appeared in Mock the Week. Jupp had a cameo role in Johnny English Reborn in 2011 as an employee of MI7. He appeared in Series 4, Episode 4 of the comedy panel game Argumental, which aired on 24 November 2011. In 2012, he appeared on Mock the Week.

In January 2012, he won on Celebrity Mastermind. In February 2012, he appeared on BBC Let's Dance for Sport Relief and danced to The Prodigy's "Firestarter". In March 2012, he appeared in an episode of the televised 45th Anniversary series of BBC Radio 4's Just a Minute quiz show, alongside Paul Merton, Gyles Brandreth and Liza Tarbuck. In July 2013, he appeared in an episode of I'm Sorry I Haven't a Clue on BBC Radio 4. He was featured in the 2014 World War II film, The Monuments Men, as British officer Major Fielding. Jupp has also appeared eight times on 8 Out of 10 Cats Does Countdown between 2014 and 2021.

In 2014, Jupp narrated the BBC television documentary series, Building Dream Homes. In 2016, he appeared in Grimsby as a police officer. On 27 April 2016, it was announced that Jupp would voice Blackberry in the forthcoming adaptation of Watership Down. In 2015, Jupp appeared as a team captain on The Really Welsh Christmas Quiz, alongside comedians Chris Corcoran, Elis James, and Omar Hamdi.

In October 2016, Jupp appeared as Giles, the chairman of the residents' committee, in the sitcom from BBC Three Josh. In 2017, he appeared as Hardy in the film, Journey's End. He played auction house appraiser Winford Collins in the episode "The Tanganyika Green" of Father Brown. In 2018, Jupp made guest appearances as Basil, an incompetent lawyer, in the television drama by ITV The Durrells.

=== Radio ===
Jupp was the narrator of the radio show The Penny Dreadfuls Present...The Brothers Faversham by the Penny Dreadfuls, which was broadcast at the beginning of 2008 on BBC Radio 7.

In 2009, Jupp became the host of BBC Radio 7 satirical comedy series Newsjack and the host of BBC Radio Scotland comedy quiz show Swots. In February 2011, he appeared as a panellist on BBC Radio 4's panel show It's Your Round. Starting in February 2012, Jupp hosted three series of a BBC Radio 4 panel show It's Not What You Know (based on his suggestion for a round on It's Your Round.), before handing the job over to Joe Lycett.

In 2011, he starred in the self-penned BBC Radio 4 comedy, In and Out of the Kitchen, "the diary, written for publication, of a somewhat minor celebrity chef, Damien Trench". A second series followed in 2013, and continued with a third series in 2014. The show had a short-lived television version in 2015. A six-part fourth series aired on BBC Radio 4 in August and September 2015.

He played the title character in BBC Radio 4 comedy Boswell's Lives (written by Jon Canter) which ran for four series, 2015–2018.

Jupp appeared as a contestant on BBC Radio 4's The News Quiz in April 2012 (Series 77; Episode 1). In June 2015 he became the new presenter of the show, replacing Sandi Toksvig. He chaired the show for 12 series, with his last appearance on 31 May 2019 (Series 99; Episode 8).

Jupp appears as retired Prime Minister Henry Tobin in Party's Over from 2019 to 2022 (12 episodes). In 2022, his four-episode sketch show, Whatever Next? With Miles Jupp was broadcast on Radio 4.

=== Live ===
In March 2008, Jupp performed his third solo show, Everyday Rage and Dinner Party Chit Chat, at the Etcetera Theatre in Camden. He presented Live at the Gilded Balloon podcast for The Guardian newspaper's coverage of the 2008 and 2009 Edinburgh Fringe. In 2019, Jupp played the role of actor David Tomlinson in The Life I Lead, a one-man show at the Salisbury Playhouse and other theatres.

== Personal life ==
Jupp and his wife Rachel met while studying in Edinburgh. They have five children. The family moved from Peckham, South London, to Monmouthshire, Wales. In 2021, Jupp suffered a seizure, following which he had surgery to remove a brain tumour.

== Stand-up shows ==
Year	Title	Notes
2003–04	Gentlemen Prefer Brogues	
2005	Young Man in a Huff	
2007	Everyday Rage & Dinner Party Chit Chat	
2008	Drifting	
2009	Telling It Like It Might Be	
2010–14	Fibber in the Heat	
2014	Miles Jupp Is the Chap You're Thinking Of	
2016–17	Songs of Freedom	
2024	On I Bang	

=== DVD releases ===
Title	Release date	Notes
Fibber in the Heat	23 September 2014	Live at Milford Haven's Torch Theatre
Miles Jupp Is the Chap You're Thinking Of	11 November 2015	Live at Margate's Theatre Royal
Songs of Freedom	1 December 2017	

== Filmography ==
=== Film ===
Year	Film	Role	Notes
2007	Harry Potter and the Order of the Phoenix	TV Weatherman	
2007	Death Defying Acts	Ventriloquist	
2008	Is Anybody There?	Vicar	
2009	Sherlock Holmes	Waiter	
2010	Made in Dagenham	Undersecretary 2	
2010	Timber!	Miles	Short film
2011	Johnny English Reborn	Technician	
2011	Connected	Shop Manager	Short film
2013	The Look of Love	Interviewer	
2014	The Monuments Men	Major Fielding	
2014	Rosewater	Maziar's Producer	
2014	The Riot Club	Male Banker	
2014	The Last Sparks of Sundown	Geoffrey Chicken	
2015	The Dark Room	The Charity Collector	Short film
2016	Grimsby	Policeman	
2016	The Legend of Tarzan	The Valet	
2016	ChickLit	Marcus	
2016	Waterboys	Horatio	
2017	Journey's End	Hardy	
2017	The Man Who Invented Christmas	William Makepeace Thackeray	
2019	Greed	Select Committee Chairman	
2020	Misbehaviour	Clive	
2022	The Silent Twins	Doctor Le Couteur	
2022	We Are Not Alone	Former Prime Minister	
2023	Napoleon	Emperor Francis II	
2024	Joy	George	
2026	Mother's Pride	Jeremy	
2026	Savage House	Decorator	

=== Television ===
Year	Film	Role	Notes
1992	Songs of Praise: A Celebration of Christmas	Himself	
2001	Revolver	Shoe Salesman	
2002–2005	Live Floor Show	Rupert Donaldson	
2002–2005	Balamory	Archie	Main role
2006	Feel the Force	Mr. Bramwell	Episode: "Murder"
2007	Wedding Belles	Male Host	Television film
2008	She Stoops to Conquer	Tony Lumpkin	Television film
2008	The Wrong Door	Ninja	Episode: "Bondo"
2009	Stewart Lee's Comedy Vehicle	Various	4 episodes
2009–2012	The Thick of It	John Duggan	2 episodes
2009–2012	Gary: Tank Commander	Captain Fanshaw	10 episodes
2010	Lip Service	Rory	2 episodes
2010–2014	Rev.	Nigel McCall	19 episodes
2011	Campus	Arnold	Episode: "Post-Coital"
2011	Peeder Jigson's Video Diary	Trevor Gertrude	Episode: "What Everyone's Up to in the Break"
2011	Comedy Lab	Stu Carter	Episode: Rick and Peter"
2012	Spy	Owen	9 episodes
2012	A Young Doctor's Notebook	Palchikov the Clerk	Episode: "Episode Four"
2013	Man Down	Man in Pub	Episode: "Episode One"
2013	Harrow: A Very British School	Narrator	8-part documentary
2014	Building Dream Homes	Narrator	
2014–present	8 Out of 10 Cats Does Countdown	Himself – Guest	
2015	In and Out of the Kitchen	Damian Trench	3 episodes; also writer
2015	The Million Pound Motors	Narrator	
2016	Do Not Disturb	John	
2016	Josh	Giles	Episode: "Sex & Politics"
2016	Alan Partridge's Scissored Isle	James Havant Brown	Television special
2016	Outnumbered	Stuart	Episode: "Christmas Special 2016"
2017	Father Brown	Wynford Collins	Episode: "The Tanganyika Green"
2017	Quacks	George Combe	Episode: "The Madman's Trial"
2017	James and Jupp	Himself	4 episodes
2017	The Crown	Humphrey	Episode: "Marionettes"
2017–2018	Bad Move	Matt	12 episodes
2017–2022	Frankie Boyle's New World Order	Panellist	24 episodes (+4 clip show episodes)
2018	Watership Down	Blackberry (voice)	Miniseries
2018–2019	The Durrells	Basil	Recurring role
2019	Tourist Trap	Dr. Phillip Hobbs	Episode: "Culture"
2019	Midsomer Murders	Cornelius Tetbury	Episode: "With Baited Breath"
2020	The Great	Maxim the Painter	Episode: "War and Vomit"
2021	Sex Education	Obstetrician	Episode: "Episode 5"
2021	Grantchester	Marcus Asper	Episode: "Episode 2"
2021	A Very British Scandal	Dr. Ivor Griffiths	2 episodes
2022	Why Didn't They Ask Evans?	Henry Bassington-ffrench	3 part miniseries
2022	SAS: Rogue Heroes	Major Alfred Knox	Episode: "Episode 1"
2022	Professor T.	Sean Hallett	Episode: "The Trial"
2023	The Full Monty	Darren	7 episodes
2024	Belgravia: The Next Chapter	The Duke of Rochester	8 episodes
TBA	The Detection Club	G.K. Chesterton	Upcoming ten-part detective drama

=== Theatre ===
Year	Title	Role	Notes
2005–06	Jack and the Beanstalk	Simple Simon	His Majesty's Theatre
2007	The Way of the World	Petulant	Royal Theatre
2011	A Day in the Death of Joe Egg	Bri	Citizens Theatre
2012–13	People	Bevan	National Theatre
2014	Neville's Island	Angus	Duke of York's
2015	Rules for Living	Matthew	National Theatre
2019	The Life I Lead	David Tomlinson	UK tour
2022–23	The Lavender Hill Mob	Henry Holland	UK tour

Media offices
Preceded by Sandi Toksvig	Host of The News Quiz; 2015-2019	Succeeded by In commission Next held by Nish Kumar
