= Tom Hollander =

British actor (born 1967)

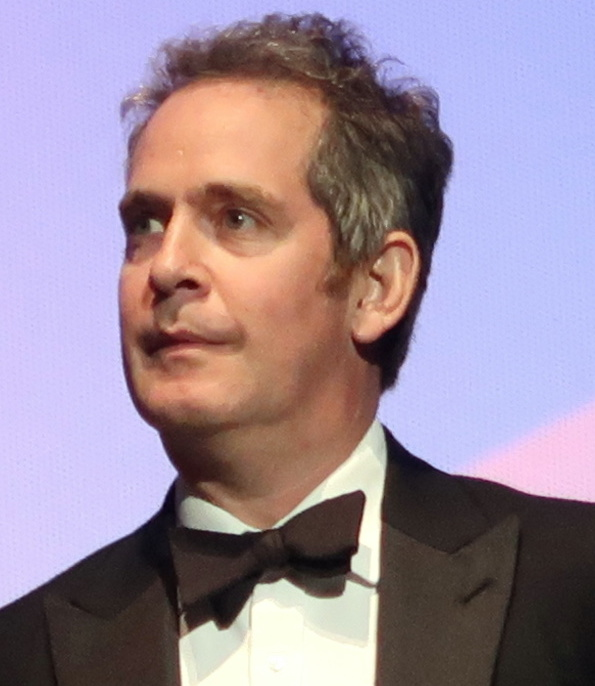
- Hollander in 2017
- Born: Thomas Anthony Hollander; 25 August 1967 (age 59); Bristol, England
- Education: Abingdon School; Selwyn College, Cambridge
- Occupation: Actor
- Years active: 1981–present
- Partner(s): Fran Hickman (2010–present; engaged)
- Children: 1

Thomas Anthony Hollander (/ˈhɒləndə/; born 25 August 1967) is an English actor. He trained with National Youth Theatre and won the Ian Charleson Award in 1992 for his performance as Witwoud in The Way of the World. He made his Broadway debut in the David Hare play The Judas Kiss in 1998. His performance as Henry Carr in a revival of the Tom Stoppard play Travesties earned nominations for both the Olivier Award and Tony Award.

Hollander gained attention portraying Mr. Collins in the 2005 Joe Wright film Pride & Prejudice, and as Lord Cutler Beckett in the Pirates of the Caribbean franchise. Other film roles include Gosford Park (2001), Elizabeth: The Golden Age (2007), Valkyrie (2008), In the Loop (2009), Hanna (2011), About Time (2013), The Invisible Woman (2013), Mission: Impossible – Rogue Nation (2015), and Bohemian Rhapsody (2018).

In television, Hollander starred in the BBC sitcom Rev. (2010–2014), which he co-wrote. He received the 2011 BAFTA Award for best sitcom for the series. His performance in the BBC series The Night Manager earned the BAFTA Award for Best Supporting Actor. Hollander portrayed King George V in The Lost Prince (2003) and The King's Man (2021), King George III in the HBO miniseries John Adams (2008), and Truman Capote in the FX on Hulu series Feud: Capote vs. The Swans (2024). Other credits include Doctor Thorne (2016), The White Lotus (2022), and Harley Quinn (2020–present).

== Early life ==
Thomas Anthony Hollander was born on 25 August 1967 in Bristol and was raised in Oxford. Hollander's father is a Czech Jew whose family converted to Catholicism, and his mother is English. Hollander was brought up as a Christian. The family background was academic and musical: his grandfather, Hans Hollander, was a musicologist who wrote books about the composer Janáček. Hollander's parents were teachers, his father running the science department at a school in Oxford.

He attended the Dragon School, and then Abingdon School, both in Oxfordshire, where he was chief chorister. As a youngster, he was a member of the National Youth Theatre and the National Youth Music Theatre (then known as the Children's Music Theatre). In 1981, at the age of 14, he won the lead role in a BBC dramatisation of Leon Garfield's John Diamond.

Hollander read English at Selwyn College, Cambridge, earning a 2:2 degree. He was actively involved in stage productions as a member of the Footlights and was president of the Marlowe Society. Sam Mendes, a friend and fellow student, directed him in several plays while they were at Cambridge, including a critically acclaimed production of Cyrano de Bergerac (which also featured future Deputy Prime Minister Nick Clegg).

== Career ==
=== 1981–1999: Early roles and Broadway debut ===
Hollander made his television debut at the age of 14 acting in the television film John Diamond (1981). Hollander won the 1992 Ian Charleson Award for his performance as Witwoud in The Way of the World at the Lyric Hammersmith Theatre. He had been nominated and commended the previous year for his Celia in an all-male production of As You Like It for Cheek by Jowl, and was again nominated and commended for his Khlestakov in The Government Inspector at the Almeida Theatre in 1997. He had also received a special commendation for his 1996 performance of the title role in Tartuffe at the Almeida Theatre. Hollander has been the most frequent Ian Charleson Award honoree, with four appearances at the awards: one win, two commendations and one special commendation. In 1995 he created the role of Baby in Jez Butterworth's play Mojo that premiered in July that year at the Royal Court Theatre in London, directed by Ian Rickson. In 1996, he made his Broadway debut portraying Lord Alfred Douglas opposite Liam Neeson as Oscar Wilde in David Hare's The Judas Kiss.

Hollander's other early roles in television include Jonathan in the BBC drama series Harry, filmed mostly in Darlington, County Durham (1993 to 1995) alongside Michael Elphick; Paolo Ferruzzi in the British sitcom Absolutely Fabulous (1996), and Osborne Hamley in the BBC miniseries Wives and Daughters (1999). Hollander made his film debut opposite Helen Mirren in the 1996 film Some Mother's Son about the 1981 Irish hunger strike. The same year, he starred in the sports drama True Blue (1996). He then acted in the British romantic comedy Martha, Meet Frank, Daniel and Laurence (1998), the comedy-drama Bedrooms and Hallways (1998), and the comedy The Clandestine Marriage (1999).

=== 2000–2015: Character roles and Rev. ===
In 2001, Hollander acted in Robert Altman's British murder mystery Gosford Park and Michael Apted's thriller Enigma. In 2003 he portrayed George V in the BBC One film The Lost Prince and Guy Burgess in the BBC Two miniseries Cambridge Spies. He had a memorable role as Mr. Collins in Joe Wright's Pride & Prejudice (2005), a film adaptation of the Jane Austen novel of the same name. for which he received the Evening Standard Film Awards Comedy Award, and London Critics Circle Best Supporting Actor. He has worked repeatedly with Michael Gambon and Bill Nighy, and is a good friend of James Purefoy. Although highly respected as a character actor and the recipient of several awards, many of Hollander's films play on his height (5' 5" / 165 cm). Hollander has created several memorable comedic characters that draw more on his physical energy and intensity than his height, such as the "brilliantly foul-mouthed" Leon in BBC Two's Freezing, described in The Times as a "braying swirl of ego and mania".

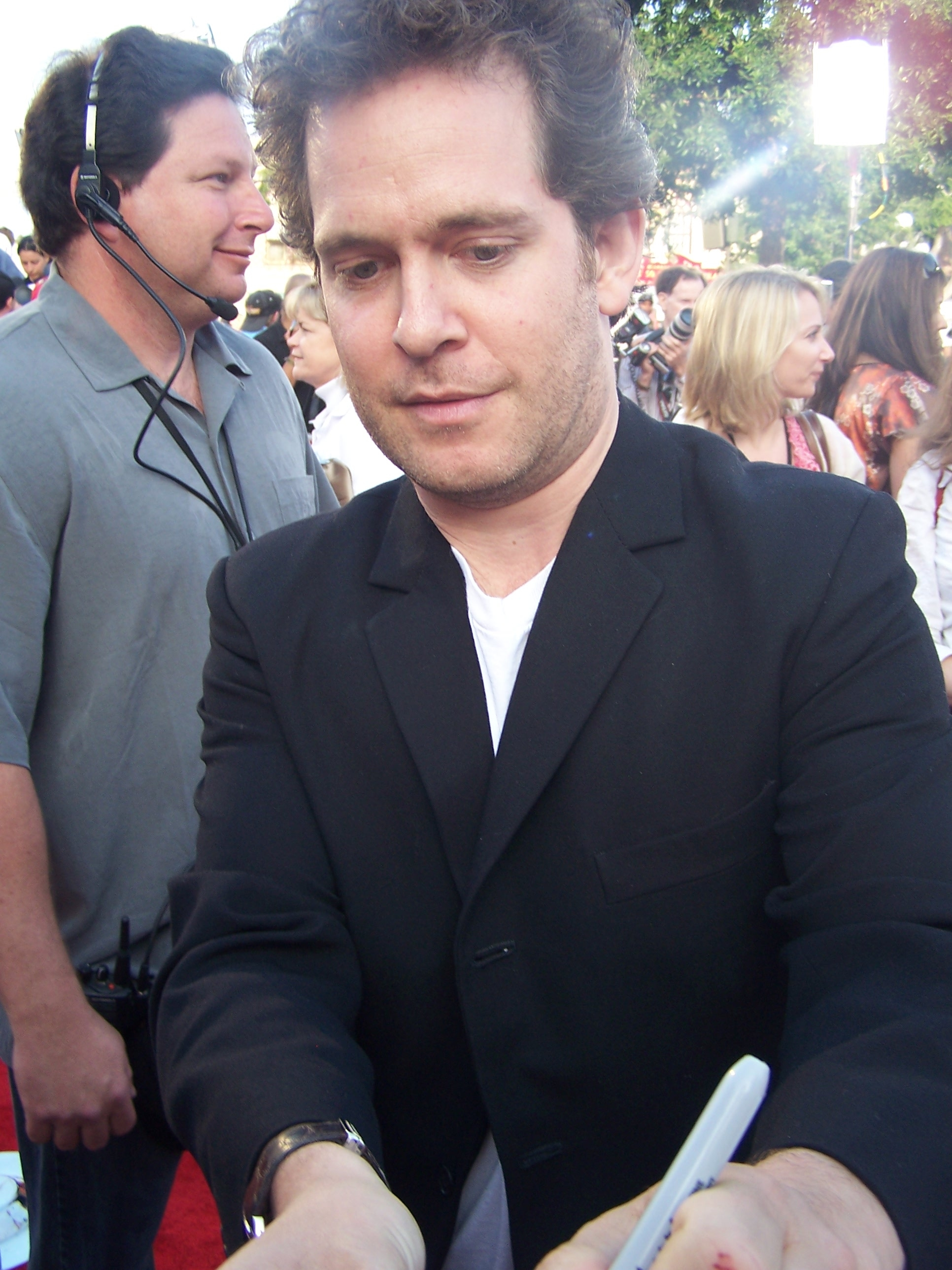
Hollander signing an autograph in 2007

Hollander has undertaken a number of voice roles for BBC Radio, including Mosca in 2004's Volpone for BBC Radio 3, Frank Churchill in Jane Austen's Emma and as Mr Gently Benevolent in the pilot of the Dickensian parody Bleak Expectations for BBC Radio 4, although he did not take part in the full series. He has voiced a young Joseph Merrick, the "Elephant Man", a disembodied head named Enzio in an urban gothic comedy and Leon Theremin, the Russian inventor famous for the electronic instrument that bears his name. He provided the vocal texture for Anthony Burgess' A Clockwork Orange recently with a "smooth, almost lyrical, crisp voice" that accomplished the task of rendering the extensive and unique slang of the book instantly understandable to readers. Since 2008, he has written an occasional diary-style column for The Spectator, and a lifestyle article in The Times, which received positive reader comments.

Hollander portrayed Lord Cutler Beckett, the "heavy" in Pirates of the Caribbean: Dead Man's Chest and Pirates of the Caribbean: At World's End. He also appeared in the TNT miniseries The Company as Kim Philby, having previously played Guy Burgess in the BBC's Cambridge Spies. Hollander returned to the stage in 2007 with the premiere of Joe Penhall's play Landscape with Weapon at the Royal National Theatre. In 2008, Hollander made a notable cameo appearance as King George III in the HBO mini-series John Adams, and ended the year as a memorable Colonel Heinz Brandt in Valkyrie. In 2009, Hollander played a symphonic cellist in Joe Wright's movie The Soloist, his second film with Wright, who cast him to great effect as the fevered suitor Mr. Collins in 2005's Pride and Prejudice. Hollander has worked once more with Wright, portraying a memorably flamboyant and menacing villain in Hanna (2011). Hollander appeared in a lead role in Armando Iannucci's In the Loop as Secretary of State for International Development Simon Foster MP. Hollander later made a surprise appearance (in a different role) at the end of the third series of The Thick of It, the programme on which In the Loop was based.

In 2010, Hollander and writer James Wood co-created the TV series Rev., a sensitive comedy about the all-too-human vicar of an inner-city parish. Hollander played the sympathetic title character, Rev. Adam Smallbone. The show won a BAFTA in 2011 for Best Situation Comedy, among other awards and recognition. A second series aired in the UK on BBC 2 in 2011 and a third series in 2014. In 2010, Hollander returned to the live stage in a demanding comedic dual role in Georges Feydeau's A Flea in Her Ear at the Old Vic. Playing both master and servant with "lightning physical precision and shockingly true confusion", Hollander's was called "a virtuoso performance".

=== 2016–2019: Travesties and The Night Manager ===
Between September and November 2016 he starred as (a "career-best") Henry Carr in Patrick Marber's "superb revival" of Tom Stoppard's Travesties at the Menier Chocolate Factory. The play (with the same cast) transferred to the Apollo Theatre in February 2017 and was nominated for five Olivier Awards including Best Actor (Hollander) and Best Revival (Travesties). Marber's revival transferred to Broadway in 2018, with Hollander reprising his leading role as Carr. The play opened on 24 April 2018 (with previews from 29 March) at the Roundabout Theatre Company's American Airlines Theatre in New York. Hollander received a Tony Award for Best Actor in a Play nomination for the production.

In 2016, he played Lance "Corky" Corkoran in the BBC miniseries The Night Manager acting opposite Tom Hiddleston, Hugh Laurie, Olivia Colman, and Elizabeth Debicki. For his performance he won the British Academy Television Award for Best Supporting Actor. That same year he acted in the BBC / FX 2017 series Taboo playing the "inebriated and endearing, menacing and beguiling" chemist, Dr George Cholmondeley. The A.V. Club described him as "giving a masterclass on how to create dimension and personality, even with limited screen time." Hollander played Queen's second manager Jim Beach in the biopic Bohemian Rhapsody, which was released in November 2018. Upon the firing of director Bryan Singer from the film in December 2017, it was reported Hollander had previously left the film due to issues with Singer; he was ultimately convinced to continue, though whether this was due to Singer's exit is unknown. Hollander played Tabaqui, a hyena in Andy Serkis' 2018 film Mowgli: Legend of the Jungle. That same year he acted in the war drama A Private War (2018) and the Netflix thriller Bird Box (2018).

More recent readings include The Casual Vacancy by J. K. Rowling. In 2015 (repeated in April 2017), he played Patrick Moore in the BBC radio play Far Side of the Moore about the astronomer and his TV series The Sky at Night. In May 2016, he portrayed Geoff Cathcart in Andy Mulligan's four-part play School Drama on BBC Radio 4, which was chosen by The Guardian for that week's best radio selections. In October that year, he narrated Peter Bradshaw's short story Reunion, broadcast on Radio 4. He has also portrayed the Russian artist Kazimir Malevich in Margy Kinmonth's documentary Revolution: New Art for a New World, which was released in the UK and Ireland in November 2016.

=== 2020–present: career expansion ===
Since 2020, he has voiced Alfred Pennyworth in the animated series Harley Quinn on HBO Max. In 2021 he portrayed multiple roles as George V, Wilhelm II, and Nicholas II of Russia in the spy action drama The King's Man. The following year he voiced The Mole in the animated short The Boy, the Mole, the Fox and the Horse (2022) which won the Academy Award for Best Animated Short Film. In 2022 he played Major Dalby, director of WOOC(P) in the ITV Cold War drama series The Ipcress File and played Quentin, a wealthy gay British expat living in Sicily, in the second season of The White Lotus. From 2022 to 2023, Hollander returned to the Almeida Theatre to play the lead role of Boris Berezovsky in the inaugural run of Patriots, a play by Peter Morgan about the late Russian oligarch's life. In 2024 he portrayed author Truman Capote in the FX on Hulu limited series Feud: Capote vs. The Swans.

== Philanthropy ==
Hollander has contributed his running and cycling efforts to several charitable causes, including running to raise funds for the Childline Crisis Hotline in 2006 and in 2007, for the Teenage Cancer Trust. He is a long-time supporter of the Helen & Douglas House Hospice for Children and Young Adults in Oxford, which provides hospice care for children. He continues to support charitable organisations by contributing readings and other appearances throughout the year.

Hollander is a patron of the British Independent Film Awards and has supported the efforts of the Old Vic's "24 Hour Plays New Voices" Gala, which forwards the cause of young writers for the British stage. In August 2014, he was one of 200 public figures who were signatories to a letter to The Guardian opposing Scottish independence in the run-up to September's referendum on that issue.

== Personal life ==
Hollander's sister is director, writer, and singer Julia Hollander. The siblings and their father Tony Hollander, presented a BBC Radio 3 documentary in 2020, exploring the story of how Tony and his parents escaped from the imminent Nazi occupation of Czechoslovakia in 1938. A letter from a BBC radio sound engineer saved his father's life by facilitating the family's entry into Britain.

Hollander has lived in the same flat in Notting Hill, West London, since 2000.

In 2010, Hollander became engaged to interior designer Fran Hickman. In 2023, they had a son, who is Hollander's first child.

In January 2016, Hollander became an Honorary Fellow of Selwyn College, Cambridge.

== Filmography ==
=== Film ===
Year	Title	Role	Notes
1993	Sylvia Hates Sam	Friend	Short
1996	Some Mother's Son	Farnsworth	
1996	True Blue	Sam Peterson	
1998	Absolutely Fabulous: Absolutely Not!	Paolo Ferruzzi	Video
1998	Martha, Meet Frank, Daniel and Laurence	Daniel	
1998	Bedrooms and Hallways	Darren	
1999	The Clandestine Marriage	Sir John Ogelby	
2000	The Announcement	Ben	
2000	Maybe Baby	Ewan Proclaimer	
2001	Enigma	Logie	
2001	Lawless Heart	Nick	
2001	Gosford Park	Anthony Meredith	
2002	Possession	Euan	
2004	Piccadilly Jim	Willie Partridge	
2004	Stage Beauty	Sir Peter Lely	
2004	Paparazzi	Leonard Clarke	
2004	The Libertine	Etherege	
2005	Pride & Prejudice	Mr. Collins	
2006	The Darwin Awards	Henry	
2006	Land of the Blind	Maximilian II	
2006	Pirates of the Caribbean: Dead Man's Chest	Cutler Beckett	
2006	A Good Year	Charlie Willis	
2006	Rabbit Fever	Tod Best	
2007	Pirates of the Caribbean: At World's End	Cutler Beckett	
2007	Elizabeth: The Golden Age	Sir Amyas Paulet	
2008	Valkyrie	Colonel Heinz Brandt	
2009	In the Loop	Simon Foster	
2009	The Soloist	Graham Claydon	
2010	Away We Stay	David	Short
2011	Hanna	Isaacs	
2011	The Voorman Problem	Voorman	Short film
2012	Whole Lotta Sole	James Butler	Uncredited role
2012	A Liar's Autobiography	Recording Engineer	Voice
2012	Mother’s Milk	Narrator (voice)	
2012	Byzantium	Kevin	
2013	About Time	Harry	
2013	The Invisible Woman	Wilkie Collins	
2014	Muppets Most Wanted	Irish Journalist	
2014	The Riot Club	Jeremy Villiers	
2015	Mission: Impossible – Rogue Nation	Prime Minister of the United Kingdom	
2016	The Promise	Garin	
2016	Revolution: New Art for a New World	Kazimir Malevich	Voice; documentary film
2017	Holy Lands	Moshe	
2017	Tulip Fever	Dr Sorgh	
2017	Breathe	Bloggs and David Blacker	
2018	A Private War	Sean Ryan	
2018	Bohemian Rhapsody	Jim Beach	
2018	Bird Box	Gary	
2018	Mowgli: Legend of the Jungle	Tabaqui	Voice
2021	Extinct	Charles Darwin	Voice
2021	The King's Man	George V / Wilhelm II / Nicholas II	
2022	The Boy, the Mole, the Fox and the Horse	The Mole	Voice; short film
2026	The Uprising	Sir Robert Hales	Post-production

=== Television ===
Year	Title	Role	Notes
1981	John Diamond	William Jones	TV film
1993–1995	Harry	Jonathan	19 episodes
1994	Milner	Ben Milner	TV film
1995	The Bill	O'Leary	Episode: "Getaway"
1996	Absolutely Fabulous	Paolo Ferruzzi	2 episodes
1997	Gobble	Pipsqueak	TV film
1999	Wives and Daughters	Osborne Hamley	Miniseries (4 episodes)
2001	The Life and Adventures of Nicholas Nickleby	Mr Mantalini	TV film
2003	The Lost Prince	George V	TV film
2003	Cambridge Spies	Guy Burgess	Miniseries (4 episodes)
2004	The Hotel in Amsterdam	Laurie	TV film
2004	London	T. S. Eliot	TV film
2005	Bridezillas	Narrator	Episode: "Korliss and Noelle"
2006–2024	American Dad!	Various characters	Voice; 13 episodes
2007	The Company	Adrian Philby	Miniseries (6 episodes)
2007–2008	Freezing	Leon	3 episodes
2008	John Adams	King George III	Episode: "Reunion"
2008	Headcases	David Cameron	Various voices; 2 episodes
2008	The Meant to Be's		TV film
2009	Desperate Romantics	John Ruskin	6 episodes
2009	Gracie!	Monty Banks	TV film
2009	The Thick of It	Cal Richards	Episode #3.8
2009	Legally Mad	Steven Pearle	Unaired pilot
2010	Any Human Heart	Prince Edward, Duke of Windsor	3 episodes
2010–2014	Rev.	The Rev. Adam Smallbone	3 series, 19 episodes; also creator, writer, and executive producer
2011	Aqua Teen Hunger Force	Chuck	Voice; episode: "Vampirus"
2012, 2018–2021	Family Guy	Various characters	Voice; 4 episodes
2013	Ambassadors	Prince Mark	2 episodes
2014	A Poet in New York	Dylan Thomas	TV film
2016	The Night Manager	Lance "Corky" Corkoran	Miniseries (6 episodes)
2016	Doctor Thorne	Doctor Thorne	3 episodes
2017	Taboo	George Cholmondeley	5 episodes
2017	The Highway Rat	The Squirrel	Voice
2018	CBeebies Bedtime Story	Nico, Rebel	One-off
2019	Baptiste	Edward Stratton	6 episodes
2020	Us	Douglas Petersen	4 episodes
2020	Robot Chicken	Percival, Professor X	Voice; Episode: "Max Caenen In: Why Would He Know If His Mother's a Size Queen"
2020–present	Harley Quinn	Alfred Pennyworth, Professor Pyg, Toyman	Voice; 13 episodes
2021	A Tale Dark & Grimm	Moon	Voice; 3 episodes
2022	The Ipcress File	Major Dalby	6 episodes
2022	The White Lotus	Quentin	Main role; season 2
2024	Feud: Capote vs. The Swans	Truman Capote	Main role; 8 episodes
2025	Monster: The Ed Gein Story	Alfred Hitchcock	2 episodes
2025	The Iris Affair	Cameron Beck	Main role; 8 episodes

=== Theatre ===
Year	Title	Role	Notes
1994–95	The Threepenny Opera	Macheath	Donmar Warehouse, West End
1997	The Government Inspector	Performer	Almeida Theatre, West End
1998	The Judas Kiss	Bosie	Almeida Theatre, West End
1998	The Judas Kiss	Bosie	Broadhurst Theatre, Broadway
2003	The Hotel In Amsterdam	Laurie	Donmar Warehouse
2016	Travesties	Henry Carr	Menier Chocolate Factory, West End
2017	Travesties	Henry Carr	Apollo Theatre, West End
2018	Travesties	Henry Carr	American Airlines Theatre, Broadway
2022–23	Patriots	Boris Berezovsky	Almeida Theatre, West End

=== Audiobooks ===
Year	Audiobook title	Author	Notes
2006	In the Company of the Courtesan	Sarah Dunant	
2009	The Lieutenant	Kate Grenville	
2009	Cityboy: Beer and Loathing in the Square	Geraint Anderson	
2010	A Clockwork Orange	Anthony Burgess	
2012	The Casual Vacancy	J. K. Rowling	
2012	Conrad: The Chrestomanci Series	Diana Wynne Jones	
2016	Agatha Christie: Twelve Radio Mysteries	Agatha Christie	Hollander is one of several narrators
2017	A Legacy of Spies	John le Carré	Digital download released on 7 September 2017, CD on 5 October 2017.

=== Video games ===
Year	Title	Voice role	Notes
2007	Pirates of the Caribbean: At World's End	Cutler Beckett	

== Awards and nominations ==
Year	Award	Category	Nominated work	Result	Ref.
Film and TV
2010	BAFTA Television Awards	Best Supporting Actor	Gracie!	Nominated	
2011	BAFTA Television Awards	Best Male Comedy Performance	Rev.	Nominated	
2012	BAFTA Television Awards	Best Scripted Comedy	Rev.	Nominated	
2012	BAFTA Television Awards	Best Male Comedy Performance	Rev.	Nominated	
2015	BAFTA Television Awards	Best Male Comedy Performance	Rev.	Nominated	
2017	BAFTA Television Awards	Best Supporting Actor	The Night Manager	Won	
2005	British Independent Film Award	Best Supporting Actor	The Libertine	Nominated	
2009	British Independent Film Award	Best Supporting Actor	In the Loop	Nominated	
2005	Evening Standard British Film Awards	Peter Sellers Award for Comedy	Pride and Prejudice	Won	
2005	London Critics Circle Film Awards	British Supporting Actor	Pride and Prejudice	Won	
2001	Screen Actors Guild Awards	Outstanding Cast in a Motion Picture	Gosford Park	Won	
2018	Screen Actors Guild Awards	Outstanding Cast in a Motion Picture	Bohemian Rhapsody	Nominated	
2023	Screen Actors Guild Awards	Outstanding Ensemble in a Drama Series	The White Lotus	Won	
2024	Primetime Emmy Awards	Outstanding Lead Actor in a Limited or Anthology Series or Movie	Feud: Capote vs. The Swans	Nominated	
Theatre
2018	Tony Awards	Best Actor in a Play	Travesties	Nominated	
2018	Drama Desk Awards	Outstanding Actor in a Play	Travesties	Nominated	
2018	Drama League Awards	Distinguished Performance	Travesties	Nominated	
2018	Outer Critics Circle Awards	Outstanding Actor in a Play	Travesties	Nominated	
2017	Laurence Olivier Awards	Best Actor	Travesties	Nominated	
2023	Laurence Olivier Awards	Best Actor	Patriots	Nominated	

== See also ==
- List of Old Abingdonians
