= List of Friends episodes =

Episodes of American television sitcom

Friends logo from the opening sequence of the series

Friends is an American television sitcom created by David Crane and Marta Kauffman, and produced by Bright/Kauffman/Crane Productions in association with Warner Bros. Television Studios for NBC. The series began with the pilot episode, which was broadcast on September 22, 1994; the series finished its ten-season run with the series finale on May 6, 2004, with 236 episodes. On average, the episodes are 22–23 minutes long, for a 30-minute time slot including commercial breaks.

The series narrative follows six friends living and working in New York City: Rachel Green, Monica Geller, Phoebe Buffay, Joey Tribbiani, Chandler Bing, and Ross Geller played by Jennifer Aniston, Courteney Cox, Lisa Kudrow, Matt LeBlanc, Matthew Perry, and David Schwimmer respectively. All episodes were filmed at Warner Bros. Studios, Burbank in front of a live studio audience, except the fourth season finale, "The One with Ross's Wedding", that was filmed on location in London in front of a British studio audience.

In addition to the episodes, three specials were produced. In Friends: The Stuff You've Never Seen, broadcast following "The One with Joey's New Brain" on February 15, 2001, Conan O'Brien hosted a light-hearted discussion with the main cast on the Central Perk set – the fictional coffee house which featured prominently in the series. The special introduced outtakes from past episodes. The two-part retrospective special "The One with All the Other Ones" was broadcast before the one-hour series finale "The Last One" on May 6, 2004, and features clips from past episodes and interviews with the cast. All episodes have been released on VHS, DVD, Blu-ray, 4K Ultra HD Blu-ray, Netflix, and HBO Max.

== Series overview ==
Season	Episodes	Originally released		Rank	Rating	Viewers (millions)
Season	Episodes	First released	Last released	Rank	Rating	Viewers (millions)
1	24	September 22, 1994	May 18, 1995	8	15.6	24.8
2	24	September 21, 1995	May 16, 1996	3	18.7	31.7
3	25	September 19, 1996	May 15, 1997	4	16.8	26.1
4	24	September 25, 1997	May 7, 1998	4	16.1	24.7
5	24	September 24, 1998	May 20, 1999	2	15.7	24.7
6	25	September 23, 1999	May 18, 2000	5	14.0	22.6
7	24	October 12, 2000	May 17, 2001	5	12.6	21.7
8	24	September 27, 2001	May 16, 2002	1	15.0	26.4
9	24	September 26, 2002	May 15, 2003	2	13.5	23.9
10	18	September 25, 2003	May 6, 2004	5	13.6	25.3

== Episodes ==
=== Season 1 (1994–1995) ===
No. overall	No. in season	Title	Directed by	Written by	Original release date	Prod. code	U.S. viewers (millions)
1	1	"Pilot" (Note: Alternative titles given to the pilot episode are "The One Where Monica Gets a Roommate", "The First One" and "The One Where It All Began".) "The One Where Monica Gets a Roommate"	James Burrows	Marta Kauffman & David Crane	September 22, 1994	475085	21.5
2	2	"The One with the Sonogram at the End"	James Burrows	Marta Kauffman & David Crane	September 29, 1994	456652	20.2
3	3	"The One with the Thumb"	James Burrows	Jeffrey Astrof & Mike Sikowitz	October 6, 1994	456651	19.5
4	4	"The One with George Stephanopoulos"	James Burrows	Alexa Junge	October 13, 1994	456654	19.7
5	5	"The One with the East German Laundry Detergent"	Pamela Fryman	Jeff Greenstein & Jeff Strauss	October 20, 1994	456653	18.6
6	6	"The One with the Butt"	Arlene Sanford	Adam Chase & Ira Ungerleider	October 27, 1994	456655	18.2
7	7	"The One with the Blackout"	James Burrows	Jeffrey Astrof & Mike Sikowitz	November 3, 1994	456656	23.5
8	8	"The One Where Nana Dies Twice"	James Burrows	Marta Kauffman & David Crane	November 10, 1994	456657	21.1
9	9	"The One Where Underdog Gets Away"	James Burrows	Jeff Greenstein & Jeff Strauss	November 17, 1994	456659	23.1
10	10	"The One with the Monkey"	Peter Bonerz	Adam Chase & Ira Ungerleider	December 15, 1994	456661	19.9
11	11	"The One with Mrs. Bing"	James Burrows	Alexa Junge	January 5, 1995	456660	26.6
12	12	"The One with The Dozen Lasagnas"	Paul Lazarus	Jeffrey Astrof & Mike Sikowitz & Adam Chase & Ira Ungerleider	January 12, 1995	456658	24.0
13	13	"The One with the Boobies"	Alan Myerson	Alexa Junge	January 19, 1995	456664	25.8
14	14	"The One with the Candy Hearts"	James Burrows	Bill Lawrence	February 9, 1995	456667	23.8
15	15	"The One with the Stoned Guy"	Alan Myerson	Jeff Greenstein & Jeff Strauss	February 16, 1995	456663	24.8
16 17	16 17	"The One with Two Parts"	Michael Lembeck	Marta Kauffman & David Crane	February 23, 1995	456665 456666	26.1 30.5
18	18	"The One with All the Poker"	James Burrows	Jeffrey Astrof & Mike Sikowitz	March 2, 1995	456662	30.4
19	19	"The One Where the Monkey Gets Away"	Peter Bonerz	Jeffrey Astrof & Mike Sikowitz	March 9, 1995	456668	29.4
20	20	"The One with the Evil Orthodontist"	Peter Bonerz	Doty Abrams	April 6, 1995	456669	30.0
21	21	"The One with the Fake Monica"	Gail Mancuso	Adam Chase & Ira Ungerleider	April 27, 1995	456671	28.4
22	22	"The One with the Ick Factor"	Robby Benson	Alexa Junge	May 4, 1995	456670	29.9
23	23	"The One with the Birth"	James Burrows	Story by : David Crane & Marta Kauffman; Teleplay by : Jeff Greenstein & Jeff Strauss	May 11, 1995	456672	28.7
24	24	"The One Where Rachel Finds Out"	Kevin S. Bright	Chris Brown	May 18, 1995	456673	31.3

=== Season 2 (1995–1996) ===
No. overall	No. in season	Title	Directed by	Written by	Original release date	Prod. code	U.S. viewers (millions)	Rating (18–49)
25	1	"The One with Ross' New Girlfriend"	Michael Lembeck	Jeffrey Astrof & Mike Sikowitz	September 21, 1995	457301	32.1	N/A
26	2	"The One with the Breast Milk"	Michael Lembeck	Adam Chase & Ira Ungerleider	September 28, 1995	457302	29.8	N/A
27	3	"The One Where Heckles Dies"	Kevin S. Bright	Michael Curtis & Gregory S. Malins	October 5, 1995	457303	30.2	N/A
28	4	"The One with Phoebe's Husband"	Gail Mancuso	Alexa Junge	October 12, 1995	457305	28.1	N/A
29	5	"The One with Five Steaks and an Eggplant"	Ellen Gittelsohn	Chris Brown	October 19, 1995	457304	28.3	N/A
30	6	"The One with the Baby on the Bus"	Gail Mancuso	Betsy Borns	November 2, 1995	457306	30.2	N/A
31	7	"The One Where Ross Finds Out"	Peter Bonerz	Michael Borkow	November 9, 1995	457307	30.5	N/A
32	8	"The One with the List"	Mary Kay Place	David Crane & Marta Kauffman	November 16, 1995	457308	32.9	N/A
33	9	"The One with Phoebe's Dad"	Kevin S. Bright	Jeffrey Astrof & Mike Sikowitz	December 14, 1995	457309	27.8	N/A
34	10	"The One with Russ"	Thomas Schlamme	Ira Ungerleider	January 4, 1996	457311	32.2	N/A
35	11	"The One with the Lesbian Wedding"	Thomas Schlamme	Doty Abrams	January 18, 1996	457312	31.6	N/A
36	12	"The One After the Super Bowl"	Michael Lembeck	Jeffrey Astrof & Mike Sikowitz	January 28, 1996 (Note: These episodes originally aired as a single double-length episode but are sometimes split into two episodes for syndication, reruns and DVD presentation.)	457313	52.9	28.2
37	13	"The One After the Super Bowl"	Michael Lembeck	Michael Borkow	January 28, 1996	457314	52.9	28.2
38	14	"The One with the Prom Video"	James Burrows	Alexa Junge	February 1, 1996	457310	33.6	16.8
39	15	"The One Where Ross and Rachel...You Know"	Michael Lembeck	Michael Curtis & Gregory S. Malins	February 8, 1996	457315	32.9	16.4
40	16	"The One Where Joey Moves Out"	Michael Lembeck	Betsy Borns	February 15, 1996	457316	31.1	15.7
41	17	"The One Where Eddie Moves In"	Michael Lembeck	Adam Chase	February 22, 1996	457317	30.2	15.0
42	18	"The One Where Dr. Ramoray Dies"	Michael Lembeck	Story by : Alexa Junge; Teleplay by : Michael Borkow	March 21, 1996	457318	30.1	14.5
43	19	"The One Where Eddie Won't Go"	Michael Lembeck	Michael Curtis & Gregory S. Malins	March 28, 1996	457319	31.2	16.1
44	20	"The One Where Old Yeller Dies"	Michael Lembeck	Story by : Michael Curtis & Gregory S. Malins; Teleplay by : Adam Chase	April 4, 1996	457320	27.4	13.8
45	21	"The One with the Bullies"	Michael Lembeck	Brian Buckner & Sebastian Jones	April 25, 1996	457321	24.7	12.4
46	22	"The One with the Two Parties"	Michael Lembeck	Alexa Junge	May 2, 1996	457322	25.5	12.2
47	23	"The One with the Chicken Pox"	Michael Lembeck	Brown Mandell	May 9, 1996	457324	26.1	13.0
48	24	"The One with Barry and Mindy's Wedding"	Michael Lembeck	Story by : Ira Ungerleider; Teleplay by : Brown Mandell	May 16, 1996	457323	29.0	13.9

=== Season 3 (1996–1997) ===
No. overall	No. in season	Title	Directed by	Written by	Original release date	Prod. code	U.S. viewers (millions)	Rating/share (18–49)
49	1	"The One with the Princess Leia Fantasy"	Gail Mancuso	Michael Curtis & Gregory S. Malins	September 19, 1996	465251	26.76	13.8/42
50	2	"The One Where No One's Ready"	Gail Mancuso	Ira Ungerleider	September 26, 1996	465252	26.73	13.3/39
51	3	"The One with the Jam"	Kevin S. Bright	Wil Calhoun	October 3, 1996	465253	25.23	12.9/40
52	4	"The One with the Metaphorical Tunnel"	Steve Zuckerman	Alexa Junge	October 10, 1996	465254	26.10	13.6/40
53	5	"The One with Frank Jr."	Steve Zuckerman	Shana Goldberg-Meehan & Scott Silveri	October 17, 1996	465255	23.25	12.1/34
54	6	"The One with the Flashback"	Peter Bonerz	David Crane & Marta Kauffman	October 31, 1996	465256	23.27	12.0/36
55	7	"The One with the Race Car Bed"	Gail Mancuso	Seth Kurland	November 7, 1996	465257	27.36	13.7/38
56	8	"The One with the Giant Poking Device"	Gail Mancuso	Adam Chase	November 14, 1996	465258	28.69	14.3/38
57	9	"The One with the Football"	Kevin S. Bright	Ira Ungerleider	November 21, 1996	465259	29.28	15.2/41
58	10	"The One Where Rachel Quits"	Terry Hughes	Gregory S. Malins & Michael Curtis	December 12, 1996	465260	25.10	12.4/36
59	11	"The One Where Chandler Can't Remember Which Sister"	Terry Hughes	Alexa Junge	January 9, 1997	465261	29.80	15.3/37
60	12	"The One with All the Jealousy"	Robby Benson	Doty Abrams	January 16, 1997	465262	29.61	15.0/38
61	13	"The One Where Monica and Richard Are Just Friends"	Robby Benson	Michael Borkow	January 30, 1997	465265	28.03	14.3/38
62	14	"The One with Phoebe's Ex-Partner"	Robby Benson	Wil Calhoun	February 6, 1997	465266	28.91	15.2/40
63	15	"The One Where Ross and Rachel Take a Break"	James Burrows	Michael Borkow	February 13, 1997	465263	27.25	13.9/38
64	16	"The One with the Morning After"	James Burrows	David Crane & Marta Kauffman	February 20, 1997	465264	28.26	14.5/40
65	17	"The One Without the Ski Trip"	Sam Simon	Shana Goldberg-Meehan & Scott Silveri	March 6, 1997	465267	25.84	12.9/37
66	18	"The One with the Hypnosis Tape"	Robby Benson	Seth Kurland	March 13, 1997	465269	28.07	13.4/37
67	19	"The One with the Tiny T-Shirt"	Terry Hughes	Adam Chase	March 27, 1997	465268	23.65	11.9/38
68	20	"The One with the Dollhouse"	Terry Hughes	Wil Calhoun	April 10, 1997	465270	24.36	12.6/39
69	21	"The One with a Chick and a Duck"	Michael Lembeck	Chris Brown	April 17, 1997	465271	23.22	11.5/36
70	22	"The One with the Screamer"	Peter Bonerz	Shana Goldberg-Meehan & Scott Silveri	April 24, 1997	465272	22.63	11.9/37
71	23	"The One with Ross' Thing"	Shelley Jensen	Ted Cohen & Andrew Reich	May 1, 1997	465274	24.17	12.9/39
72	24	"The One with the Ultimate Fighting Champion"	Robby Benson	Story by : Pang-Ni Landrum & Mark Kunerth; Teleplay by : Shana Goldberg-Meehan & Scott Silveri	May 8, 1997	465273	23.07	12.2/38
73	25	"The One at the Beach"	Pamela Fryman	Story by : Pang-Ni Landrum & Mark Kunerth; Teleplay by : Adam Chase	May 15, 1997	465275	23.39	N/A

=== Season 4 (1997–1998) ===
No. overall	No. in season	Title	Directed by	Written by	Original release date	Prod. code	U.S. viewers (millions)	Rating/share (18–49)
74	1	"The One with the Jellyfish"	Shelley Jensen	Wil Calhoun	September 25, 1997	466601	29.43	15.5/44
75	2	"The One with the Cat"	Shelley Jensen	Jill Condon & Amy Toomin	October 2, 1997	466602	25.54	13.3/40
76	3	"The One with the Cuffs"	Peter Bonerz	Seth Kurland	October 9, 1997	466603	23.98	12.4/37
77	4	"The One with the Ballroom Dancing"	Gail Mancuso	Ted Cohen & Andrew Reich	October 16, 1997	466604	24.31	12.6/37
78	5	"The One with Joey's New Girlfriend"	Gail Mancuso	Gregory S. Malins & Michael Curtis	October 30, 1997	466605	24.35	12.7/35
79	6	"The One with the Dirty Girl"	Shelley Jensen	Shana Goldberg-Meehan & Scott Silveri	November 6, 1997	466606	25.68	13.5/38
80	7	"The One Where Chandler Crosses the Line"	Kevin S. Bright	Adam Chase	November 13, 1997	466607	26.35	13.9/38
81	8	"The One with Chandler in a Box"	Peter Bonerz	Michael Borkow	November 20, 1997	466608	26.76	13.7/39
82	9	"The One Where They're Going to Party!"	Peter Bonerz	Ted Cohen & Andrew Reich	December 11, 1997	466609	23.89	N/A
83	10	"The One with the Girl from Poughkeepsie"	Gary Halvorson	Scott Silveri	December 18, 1997	466612	23.22	N/A
84	11	"The One with Phoebe's Uterus"	David Steinberg	Seth Kurland	January 8, 1998	466610	23.66	N/A
85	12	"The One with the Embryos"	Kevin S. Bright	Jill Condon & Amy Toomin	January 15, 1998	466611	27.14	N/A
86	13	"The One with Rachel's Crush"	Dana DeVally Piazza	Shana Goldberg-Meehan	January 29, 1998	466613	25.27	13.0/36
87	14	"The One with Joey's Dirty Day"	Peter Bonerz	Wil Calhoun	February 5, 1998	466614	25.08	14.5/37
88	15	"The One with All the Rugby"	James Burrows	Story by : Ted Cohen & Andrew Reich; Teleplay by : Wil Calhoun	February 26, 1998	466617	24.44	12.8/35
89	16	"The One with the Fake Party"	Michael Lembeck	Story by : Alicia Sky Varinaitis; Teleplay by : Scott Silveri & Shana Goldberg-Meehan	March 19, 1998	466615	23.13	11.7/33
90	17	"The One with the Free Porn"	Michael Lembeck	Story by : Mark Kunerth; Teleplay by : Richard Goodman	March 26, 1998	466616	23.22	12.1/36
91	18	"The One with Rachel's New Dress"	Gail Mancuso	Story by : Andrew Reich & Ted Cohen; Teleplay by : Jill Condon & Amy Toomin	April 2, 1998	466620	21.72	11.5/33
92	19	"The One with All the Haste"	Kevin S. Bright	Scott Silveri & Wil Calhoun	April 9, 1998	466618	21.76	11.4/36
93	20	"The One with All the Wedding Dresses"	Gail Mancuso	Story by : Adam Chase; Teleplay by : Gregory S. Malins & Michael Curtis	April 16, 1998	466621	21.94	11.6/35
94	21	"The One with the Invitation"	Peter Bonerz	Seth Kurland	April 23, 1998	466619	21.51	11.3/37
95	22	"The One with the Worst Best Man Ever"	Peter Bonerz	Story by : Seth Kurland; Teleplay by : Gregory S. Malins & Michael Curtis	April 30, 1998	466622	23.15	11.9/38
96	23	"The One with Ross' Wedding"	Kevin S. Bright	Michael Borkow	May 7, 1998	466623	31.61	16.7/49
97	24	"The One with Ross' Wedding"	Kevin S. Bright	Story by : Jill Condon & Amy Toomin; Teleplay by : Shana Goldberg-Meehan & Scott Silveri	May 7, 1998	466624	31.61	16.7/49

=== Season 5 (1998–1999) ===
No. overall	No. in season	Title	Directed by	Written by	Original release date	Prod. code	U.S. viewers (millions)	Rating/share (18–49)
98	1	"The One After Ross Says Rachel"	Kevin S. Bright	Seth Kurland	September 24, 1998	467651	31.12	16.6/46
99	2	"The One with All the Kissing"	Gary Halvorson	Wil Calhoun	October 1, 1998	467652	25.36	13.3/40
100	3	"The One Hundredth"	Kevin S. Bright	David Crane & Marta Kauffman	October 8, 1998	467653	26.82	N/A
101	4	"The One Where Phoebe Hates PBS"	Shelley Jensen	Michael Curtis	October 15, 1998	467654	24.09	12.7/38
102	5	"The One with the Kips"	Dana DeVally Piazza	Scott Silveri	October 29, 1998	467655	25.87	13.5/38
103	6	"The One with the Yeti"	Gary Halvorson	Alexa Junge	November 5, 1998	467656	24.99	13.1/36
104	7	"The One Where Ross Moves In"	Gary Halvorson	Gigi McCreery & Perry Rein	November 12, 1998	467657	24.44	12.9/36
105	8	"The One with the Thanksgiving Flashbacks"	Kevin S. Bright	Gregory S. Malins	November 19, 1998	467658	23.92	12.4/35
106	9	"The One with Ross' Sandwich"	Gary Halvorson	Ted Cohen & Andrew Reich	December 10, 1998	467659	23.03	11.9/35
107	10	"The One with the Inappropriate Sister"	Dana DeVally Piazza	Shana Goldberg-Meehan	December 17, 1998	467660	23.67	12.0/36
108	11	"The One with All the Resolutions"	Joe Regalbuto	Story by : Brian Boyle; Teleplay by : Suzie Villandry	January 7, 1999	467661	27.02	14.2/37
109	12	"The One with Chandler's Work Laugh"	Kevin S. Bright	Alicia Sky Varinaitis	January 21, 1999	467662	24.82	13.3/35
110	13	"The One with Joey's Bag"	Gail Mancuso	Story by : Michael Curtis; Teleplay by : Seth Kurland	February 4, 1999	467663	24.92	13.2/36
111	14	"The One Where Everybody Finds Out"	Michael Lembeck	Alexa Junge	February 11, 1999	467664	27.70	15.0/41
112	15	"The One with the Girl Who Hits Joey"	Kevin S. Bright	Adam Chase	February 18, 1999	467665	29.31	15.3/40
113	16	"The One with the Cop"	Andrew Tsao	Story by : Alicia Sky Varinaitis; Teleplay by : Gigi McCreery & Perry Rein	February 25, 1999	467666	26.02	13.9/37
114	17	"The One with Rachel's Inadvertent Kiss"	Shelley Jensen	Andrew Reich & Ted Cohen	March 18, 1999	467667	24.48	12.7/35
115	18	"The One Where Rachel Smokes"	Todd Holland	Michael Curtis	April 8, 1999	467668	21.88	11.8/38
116	19	"The One Where Ross Can't Flirt"	Gail Mancuso	Doty Abrams	April 22, 1999	467669	20.85	10.9/36
117	20	"The One with the Ride-Along"	Gary Halvorson	Shana Goldberg-Meehan & Seth Kurland	April 29, 1999	467670	19.63	10.8/34
118	21	"The One with the Ball"	Gary Halvorson	Story by : Scott Silveri; Teleplay by : Gregory S. Malins	May 6, 1999	467671	20.92	11.2/36
119	22	"The One with Joey's Big Break"	Gary Halvorson	Story by : Shana Goldberg-Meehan; Teleplay by : Wil Calhoun	May 13, 1999	467672	21.28	11.2/35
120	23	"The One in Vegas"	Kevin S. Bright	Ted Cohen & Andrew Reich	May 20, 1999	467673	25.90	14.2/42
121	24	"The One in Vegas"	Kevin S. Bright	Gregory S. Malins & Scott Silveri	May 20, 1999	467674	25.90	14.2/42

=== Season 6 (1999–2000) ===
No. overall	No. in season	Title	Directed by	Written by	Original release date	Prod. code	U.S. viewers (millions)	Rating/share (18–49)
122	1	"The One After Vegas"	Kevin S. Bright	Adam Chase	September 23, 1999	225551	27.74	15.0/44
123	2	"The One Where Ross Hugs Rachel"	Gail Mancuso	Shana Goldberg-Meehan	September 30, 1999	225552	22.95	11.9/37
124	3	"The One with Ross' Denial"	Gary Halvorson	Seth Kurland	October 7, 1999	225553	21.60	11.5/34
125	4	"The One Where Joey Loses His Insurance"	Gary Halvorson	Andrew Reich & Ted Cohen	October 14, 1999	225554	21.07	11.2/34
126	5	"The One with Joey's Porsche"	Gary Halvorson	Perry Rein & Gigi McCreery	October 21, 1999	225555	22.39	11.5/34
127	6	"The One on the Last Night"	David Schwimmer	Scott Silveri	November 4, 1999	225556	23.59	12.3/34
128	7	"The One Where Phoebe Runs"	Gary Halvorson	Sherry Bilsing-Graham & Ellen Plummer	November 11, 1999	225557	22.75	11.6/31
129	8	"The One with Ross's Teeth"	Gary Halvorson	Story by : Andrew Reich & Ted Cohen; Teleplay by : Perry Rein & Gigi McCreery	November 18, 1999	225558	22.14	10.8/31
130	9	"The One Where Ross Got High"	Kevin S. Bright	Gregory S. Malins	November 25, 1999	225559	19.17	8.7/25
131	10	"The One with the Routine"	Kevin S. Bright	Brian Boyle	December 16, 1999	225560	22.43	10.8/33
132	11	"The One with the Apothecary Table"	Kevin S. Bright	Story by : Zachary Rosenblatt; Teleplay by : Brian Boyle	January 6, 2000	225561	22.26	11.0/30
133	12	"The One with the Joke"	Gary Halvorson	Story by : Shana Goldberg-Meehan; Teleplay by : Andrew Reich & Ted Cohen	January 13, 2000	225562	22.33	11.4/30
134	13	"The One with Rachel's Sister"	Gary Halvorson	Story by : Seth Kurland; Teleplay by : Sherry Bilsing-Graham & Ellen Plummer	February 3, 2000	225563	24.14	12.2/34
135	14	"The One Where Chandler Can't Cry"	Kevin S. Bright	Andrew Reich & Ted Cohen	February 10, 2000	225564	23.82	12.1/33
136	15	"The One That Could Have Been"	Michael Lembeck	Gregory S. Malins & Adam Chase	February 17, 2000	225565	25.89	13.7/35
137	16	"The One That Could Have Been"	Michael Lembeck	David Crane & Marta Kauffman	February 17, 2000	225566	25.89	13.7/35
138	17	"The One with Unagi"	Gary Halvorson	Story by : Zachary Rosenblatt; Teleplay by : Adam Chase	February 24, 2000	225567	22.21	11.3/31
139	18	"The One Where Ross Dates a Student"	Gary Halvorson	Seth Kurland	March 9, 2000	225568	20.52	10.1/29
140	19	"The One with Joey's Fridge"	Ben Weiss	Story by : Seth Kurland; Teleplay by : Gigi McCreery & Perry Rein	March 23, 2000	225569	21.46	10.4/30
141	20	"The One with Mac and C.H.E.E.S.E."	Kevin S. Bright	Doty Abrams	April 13, 2000	225570	18.81	9.6/31
142	21	"The One Where Ross Meets Elizabeth's Dad"	Michael Lembeck	Story by : David J. Lagana; Teleplay by : Scott Silveri	April 27, 2000	225571	20.63	10.8/32
143	22	"The One Where Paul's the Man"	Gary Halvorson	Story by : Brian Caldirola; Teleplay by : Sherry Bilsing-Graham & Ellen Plummer	May 4, 2000	225572	20.01	10.2/33
144	23	"The One with the Ring"	Gary Halvorson	Ted Cohen & Andrew Reich	May 11, 2000	225575	20.87	10.2/34
145	24	"The One with the Proposal"	Kevin S. Bright	Shana Goldberg-Meehan & Scott Silveri	May 18, 2000	225573	30.73	16.0/44
146	25	"The One with the Proposal"	Kevin S. Bright	Andrew Reich & Ted Cohen	May 18, 2000	225574	30.73	16.0/44

=== Season 7 (2000–2001) ===
No. overall	No. in season	Title	Directed by	Written by	Original release date	Prod. code	U.S. viewers (millions)	Rating/share (18–49)
147	1	"The One with Monica's Thunder"	Kevin S. Bright	Story by : Wil Calhoun; Teleplay by : David Crane & Marta Kauffman	October 12, 2000	226401	25.54	13.7/38
148	2	"The One with Rachel's Book"	Michael Lembeck	Andrew Reich & Ted Cohen	October 12, 2000	226402	27.93	15.4/39
149	3	"The One with Phoebe's Cookies"	Gary Halvorson	Sherry Bilsing & Ellen Plummer	October 19, 2000	226403	22.72	11.7/35
150	4	"The One with Rachel's Assistant"	David Schwimmer	Brian Boyle	October 26, 2000	226404	22.66	11.7/32
151	5	"The One with the Engagement Picture"	Gary Halvorson	Story by : Earl Davis; Teleplay by : Patty Lin	November 2, 2000	226405	24.43	12.8/34
152	6	"The One with the Nap Partners"	Gary Halvorson	Brian Buckner & Sebastian Jones	November 9, 2000	226406	22.01	11.2/30
153	7	"The One with Ross' Library Book"	David Schwimmer	Scott Silveri	November 16, 2000	226407	23.73	12.1/32
154	8	"The One Where Chandler Doesn't Like Dogs"	Kevin S. Bright	Patty Lin	November 23, 2000	226408	16.57	7.3/22
155	9	"The One with All the Candy"	David Schwimmer	Wil Calhoun	December 7, 2000	226409	21.08	11.0/30
156	10	"The One with the Holiday Armadillo"	Gary Halvorson	Gregory S. Malins	December 14, 2000	226410	23.26	11.5/32
157	11	"The One with All the Cheesecakes"	Gary Halvorson	Shana Goldberg-Meehan	January 4, 2001	226411	24.37	12.4/32
158	12	"The One Where They're Up All Night"	Kevin S. Bright	Zack Rosenblatt	January 11, 2001	226412	22.86	11.6/30
159	13	"The One Where Rosita Dies"^{†}	Stephen Prime	Story by : Ellen Plummer & Sherry Bilsing; Teleplay by : Brian Buckner & Sebastian Jones	February 1, 2001	226413	22.24	10.8/27
160	14	"The One Where They All Turn Thirty"^{†}	Ben Weiss	Story by : Vanessa McCarthy; Teleplay by : Ellen Plummer & Sherry Bilsing	February 8, 2001	226414	22.40	11.2/27
161	15	"The One with Joey's New Brain"^{†}	Kevin S. Bright	Story by : Sherry Bilsing & Ellen Plummer; Teleplay by : Andrew Reich & Ted Cohen	February 15, 2001	226415	21.75	10.6/27
162	16	"The One with the Truth About London"^{†}	David Schwimmer	Story by : Brian Buckner & Sebastian Jones; Teleplay by : Zachary Rosenblatt	February 22, 2001	226416	21.22	9.9/24
163	17	"The One with the Cheap Wedding Dress"	Kevin S. Bright	Story by : Brian Buckner & Sebastian Jones; Teleplay by : Andrew Reich & Ted Cohen	March 15, 2001	226417	20.84	10.0/29
164	18	"The One with Joey's Award"	Gary Halvorson	Story by : Sherry Bilsing & Ellen Plummer; Teleplay by : Brian Boyle	March 29, 2001	226418	17.81	8.1/21
165	19	"The One with Ross and Monica's Cousin"	Gary Halvorson	Andrew Reich & Ted Cohen	April 19, 2001	226419	16.55	7.7/22
166	20	"The One with Rachel's Big Kiss"	Gary Halvorson	Scott Silveri & Shana Goldberg-Meehan	April 26, 2001	226420	16.30	8.1/24
167	21	"The One with the Vows"	Gary Halvorson	Doty Abrams	May 3, 2001	226421	15.65	7.6/21
168	22	"The One with Chandler's Dad"	Kevin S. Bright & Gary Halvorson	Story by : Gregory S. Malins; Teleplay by : Brian Buckner & Sebastian Jones	May 10, 2001	226424	17.23	8.6/27
169	23	"The One with Monica and Chandler's Wedding"	Kevin S. Bright	Gregory S. Malins	May 17, 2001	226422	30.05	15.7/43
170	24	"The One with Monica and Chandler's Wedding"	Kevin S. Bright	Marta Kauffman & David Crane	May 17, 2001	226423	30.05	15.7/43

=== Season 8 (2001–2002) ===
No. overall	No. in season	Title	Directed by	Written by	Original release date	Prod. code	U.S. viewers (millions)	Rating/share (18–49)
171	1	"The One After 'I Do'"	Kevin S. Bright	David Crane & Marta Kauffman	September 27, 2001	227401	31.70	15.8/43
172	2	"The One with the Red Sweater"	David Schwimmer	Dana Klein Borkow	October 4, 2001	227402	30.04	14.7/41
173	3	"The One Where Rachel Tells..."	Sheldon Epps	Sherry Bilsing & Ellen Plummer	October 11, 2001	227403	29.20	15.4/34
174	4	"The One with the Videotape"	Kevin S. Bright	Scott Silveri	October 18, 2001	227406	25.58	12.2/32
175	5	"The One with Rachel's Date"	Gary Halvorson	Brian Buckner & Sebastian Jones	October 25, 2001	227404	25.64	12.5/33
176	6	"The One with the Halloween Party"	Gary Halvorson	Mark Kunerth	November 1, 2001	227405	26.96	13.5/33
177	7	"The One with the Stain"	Kevin S. Bright	R. Lee Fleming Jr.	November 8, 2001	227407	24.24	12.1/30
178	8	"The One with the Stripper"	David Schwimmer	Andrew Reich & Ted Cohen	November 15, 2001	227408	26.54	12.6/33
179	9	"The One with the Rumor"	Gary Halvorson	Shana Goldberg-Meehan	November 22, 2001	227410	24.24	11.1/31
180	10	"The One with Monica's Boots"	Kevin S. Bright	Story by : Robert Carlock; Teleplay by : Brian Buckner & Sebastian Jones	December 6, 2001	227409	22.44	10.6/29
181	11	"The One with Ross's Step Forward"	Gary Halvorson	Robert Carlock	December 13, 2001	227411	23.85	11.4/32
182	12	"The One Where Joey Dates Rachel"	David Schwimmer	Sherry Bilsing-Graham & Ellen Plummer	January 10, 2002	227412	25.53	12.8/30
183	13	"The One Where Chandler Takes a Bath"	Ben Weiss	Vanessa McCarthy	January 17, 2002	227413	29.24	14.1/35
184	14	"The One with the Secret Closet"	Kevin S. Bright	Brian Buckner & Sebastian Jones	January 31, 2002	227414	28.64	14.2/37
185	15	"The One with the Birthing Video"	Kevin S. Bright	Dana Klein Borkow	February 7, 2002	227415	28.64	14.5/37
186	16	"The One Where Joey Tells Rachel"	Ben Weiss	Andrew Reich & Ted Cohen	February 28, 2002	227416	27.52	13.2/33
187	17	"The One with the Tea Leaves"	Gary Halvorson	Story by : R. Lee Fleming Jr. Teleplay by : Steven Rosenhaus	March 7, 2002	227417	26.30	12.4/32
188	18	"The One in Massapequa"	Gary Halvorson	Story by : Peter Tibbals; Teleplay by : Mark Kunerth	March 28, 2002	227418	22.05	10.5/30
189	19	"The One with Joey's Interview"	Gary Halvorson	Doty Abrams	April 4, 2002	227424	22.59	11.3/30
190	20	"The One with the Baby Shower"	Kevin S. Bright	Sherry Bilsing-Graham & Ellen Plummer	April 25, 2002	227421	22.24	10.7/29
191	21	"The One with the Cooking Class"	Gary Halvorson	Story by : Dana Klein Borkow; Teleplay by : Brian Buckner & Sebastian Jones	May 2, 2002	227419	23.97	11.7/32
192	22	"The One Where Rachel Is Late"	Gary Halvorson	Shana Goldberg-Meehan	May 9, 2002	227420	24.32	11.7/33
193	23	"The One Where Rachel Has a Baby"	Kevin S. Bright	Scott Silveri	May 16, 2002	227422	34.91	17.0/44
194	24	"The One Where Rachel Has a Baby"	Kevin S. Bright	Marta Kauffman & David Crane	May 16, 2002	227423	34.91	17.0/44

=== Season 9 (2002–2003) ===
No. overall	No. in season	Title	Directed by	Written by	Original release date	Prod. code	U.S. viewers (millions)	Rating/share (18–49)
195	1	"The One Where No One Proposes"	Kevin S. Bright	Sherry Bilsing-Graham & Ellen Plummer	September 26, 2002	175251	34.01	16.6/42
196	2	"The One Where Emma Cries"	Sheldon Epps	Dana Klein Borkow	October 3, 2002	175252	28.93	14.7/38
197	3	"The One with the Pediatrician"	Roger Christiansen	Brian Buckner & Sebastian Jones	October 10, 2002	175254	26.63	12.7/33
198	4	"The One with the Sharks"	Ben Weiss	Andrew Reich & Ted Cohen	October 17, 2002	175253	25.81	12.7/34
199	5	"The One with Phoebe's Birthday Dinner"	David Schwimmer	Scott Silveri	October 31, 2002	175255	24.46	11.8/32
200	6	"The One with the Male Nanny"^{†}	Kevin S. Bright	David Crane & Marta Kauffman	November 7, 2002	175256	27.51	13.4/35
201	7	"The One with Ross' Inappropriate Song"	Gary Halvorson	Robert Carlock	November 14, 2002	175257	25.35	12.1/32
202	8	"The One with Rachel's Other Sister"	Kevin S. Bright	Shana Goldberg-Meehan	November 21, 2002	175258	26.76	12.5/32
203	9	"The One with Rachel's Phone Number"	Ben Weiss	Mark Kunerth	December 5, 2002	175259	25.43	12.1/30
204	10	"The One with Christmas in Tulsa"	Kevin S. Bright	Doty Abrams	December 12, 2002	175260	22.29	10.3/29
205	11	"The One Where Rachel Goes Back to Work"	Gary Halvorson	Story by : Judd Rubin; Teleplay by : Peter Tibbals	January 9, 2003	175261	23.67	11.5/30
206	12	"The One with Phoebe's Rats"	Ben Weiss	Story by : Dana Klein Borkow; Teleplay by : Brian Buckner & Sebastian Jones	January 16, 2003	175262	23.66	11.2/29
207	13	"The One Where Monica Sings"^{†}	Gary Halvorson	Story by : Sherry Bilsing-Graham & Ellen Plummer; Teleplay by : Steven Rosenhaus	January 30, 2003	175263	25.82	12.2/31
208	14	"The One with the Blind Dates"	Gary Halvorson	Sherry Bilsing-Graham & Ellen Plummer	February 6, 2003	175265	23.37	11.1/28
209	15	"The One with the Mugging"	Gary Halvorson	Peter Tibbals	February 13, 2003	175264	20.85	9.5/27
210	16	"The One with the Boob Job"	Gary Halvorson	Mark Kunerth	February 20, 2003	175266	19.52	8.8/22
211	17	"The One with the Memorial Service"	Gary Halvorson	Story by : Robert Carlock; Teleplay by : Brian Buckner & Sebastian Jones	March 13, 2003	175267	21.00	10.0/27
212	18	"The One with the Lottery"	Gary Halvorson	Story by : Brian Buckner & Sebastian Jones; Teleplay by : Sherry Bilsing-Graham & Ellen Plummer	April 3, 2003	175268	20.79	9.8/27
213	19	"The One with Rachel's Dream"	Terry Hughes	Story by : Dana Klein Borkow; Teleplay by : Mark Kunerth	April 17, 2003	175269	18.24	8.4/26
214	20	"The One with the Soap Opera Party"	Sheldon Epps	Story by : Shana Goldberg-Meehan; Teleplay by : Andrew Reich & Ted Cohen	April 24, 2003	175270	20.71	9.9/30
215	21	"The One with the Fertility Test"^{†}	Gary Halvorson	Story by : Scott Silveri; Teleplay by : Robert Carlock	May 1, 2003	175271	19.03	8.7/27
216	22	"The One with the Donor"	Ben Weiss	Andrew Reich & Ted Cohen	May 8, 2003	175272	19.55	9.3/27
217	23	"The One in Barbados"	Kevin S. Bright	Shana Goldberg-Meehan & Scott Silveri	May 15, 2003	175273	25.46	12.4/36
218	24	"The One in Barbados"	Kevin S. Bright	Marta Kauffman & David Crane	May 15, 2003	175274	25.46	12.4/36

=== Season 10 (2003–2004) ===
No. overall	No. in season	Title	Directed by	Written by	Original release date	Prod. code	U.S. viewers (millions)	Rating/share (18–49)
219	1	"The One After Joey and Rachel Kiss" (Note: Denotes a "super-sized" 40-minute episode (with advertisements; actual runtime around 28 minutes).)	Kevin S. Bright	Andrew Reich & Ted Cohen	September 25, 2003	176251	24.54	11.8/33
220	2	"The One Where Ross Is Fine"	Ben Weiss	Sherry Bilsing-Graham & Ellen Plummer	October 2, 2003	176252	22.37	10.6/30
221	3	"The One with Ross' Tan"	Gary Halvorson	Brian Buckner	October 9, 2003	176253	21.87	10.3/28
222	4	"The One with the Cake"	Gary Halvorson	Robert Carlock	October 23, 2003	176254	18.77	9.1/25
223	5	"The One Where Rachel's Sister Babysits"	Roger Christiansen	Dana Klein Borkow	October 30, 2003	176255	19.37	9.0/24
224	6	"The One with Ross's Grant"	Ben Weiss	Sebastian Jones	November 6, 2003	176256	20.38	9.2/25
225	7	"The One with the Home Study"	Kevin S. Bright	Mark Kunerth	November 13, 2003	176257	20.21	9.5/25
226	8	"The One with the Late Thanksgiving"	Gary Halvorson	Shana Goldberg-Meehan	November 20, 2003	176259	20.66	9.4/26
227	9	"The One with the Birth Mother"	David Schwimmer	Scott Silveri	January 8, 2004	176258	25.49	11.9/31
228	10	"The One Where Chandler Gets Caught"	Gary Halvorson	Doty Abrams	January 15, 2004	176268	26.68	12.9/34
229	11	"The One Where the Stripper Cries"	Kevin S. Bright	David Crane & Marta Kauffman	February 5, 2004	176260	24.91	11.4/29
230	12	"The One with Phoebe's Wedding"	Kevin S. Bright	Robert Carlock & Dana Klein Borkow	February 12, 2004	176262	25.90	11.4/29
231	13	"The One Where Joey Speaks French"	Gary Halvorson	Sherry Bilsing-Graham & Ellen Plummer	February 19, 2004	176261	24.27	11.0/29
232	14	"The One with Princess Consuela"	Gary Halvorson	Story by : Robert Carlock; Teleplay by : Tracy Reilly	February 26, 2004	176263	22.83	10.6/27
233	15	"The One Where Estelle Dies"	Gary Halvorson	Story by : Mark Kunerth; Teleplay by : David Crane & Marta Kauffman	April 22, 2004	176264	22.64	10.3/31
234	16	"The One with Rachel's Going Away Party"	Gary Halvorson	Andrew Reich & Ted Cohen	April 29, 2004	176265	24.51	11.2/32
235	17	"The Last One"	Kevin S. Bright	Marta Kauffman & David Crane	May 6, 2004	176266	52.46	24.9/54
236	18	"The Last One"	Kevin S. Bright	Marta Kauffman & David Crane	May 6, 2004	176267	52.46	24.9/54

- ^† denotes a "super-sized" 40-minute episode (with advertisements; actual runtime around 28 minutes).

== Specials ==
No.	Title	Directed by	Written by	Original release date	U.S. viewers (millions)	Rating/share (18–49)
1	"Friends: The Stuff You've Never Seen"	–	–	February 15, 2001	22.50	11.6/27
A 17-minute special hosted by Conan O'Brien.
2	"The One with All the Other Ones" "The One Before the Last One"	–	–	May 6, 2004	36.89	16.7/44
3	"The One with All the Other Ones" "The One Before the Last One"	–	–	May 6, 2004	36.89	16.7/44
A flashback about the series.
4	"Friends: The Reunion"	Ben Winston	David Crane	May 27, 2021	–	–
Nearly 18 years have passed since filming the finale of the original series. The actors reunite on the show's original soundstage for a celebration of the sitcom filled with memories, laughter, tears, and special guests.

== Ratings ==
The large spike in season 2 is for the double episode "The One After the Superbowl", which aired after Super Bowl XXX.

Friends : U.S. viewers per episode (millions)

Season	Episode number																								
Season	1	2	3	4	5	6	7	8	9	10	11	12	13	14	15	16	17	18	19	20	21	22	23	24	25
1	21.5	20.2	19.5	19.7	18.6	18.2	23.5	21.1	23.1	19.9	26.6	24.0	25.8	23.8	24.8	26.1	30.5	30.4	29.4	30.0	28.4	29.9	28.7	31.3	–
2	32.1	29.8	30.2	28.1	28.3	30.2	30.5	32.9	27.8	32.2	31.6	52.9	52.9	33.6	32.9	31.1	30.2	30.1	31.2	27.4	24.7	25.5	26.1	29.0	–
3	26.76	26.73	25.23	26.10	23.25	23.27	27.36	28.69	29.28	25.10	29.80	29.61	28.03	28.91	27.25	28.26	25.84	28.07	23.65	24.36	23.22	22.63	24.17	23.07	23.39
4	29.43	25.54	23.98	24.31	24.35	25.68	26.35	26.76	23.89	23.22	23.66	27.14	25.27	25.08	24.44	23.13	23.22	21.72	21.76	21.94	21.51	23.15	31.61	31.61	–
5	31.12	25.36	26.82	24.09	25.87	24.99	24.44	23.92	23.03	23.67	27.02	24.82	24.92	27.70	29.31	26.02	24.48	21.88	20.85	19.63	20.92	21.28	25.90	25.90	–
6	27.74	22.95	21.60	21.07	22.39	23.59	22.75	22.14	19.17	22.43	22.26	22.33	24.14	23.82	25.89	25.89	22.21	20.52	21.46	18.81	20.63	20.01	20.87	30.73	30.73
7	25.54	27.93	22.72	22.66	24.43	22.01	23.73	16.57	21.08	23.26	24.37	22.86	22.24	22.40	21.75	21.22	20.84	17.81	16.55	16.30	15.65	17.23	30.05	30.05	–
8	31.70	30.04	29.20	25.58	25.64	26.96	24.24	26.54	24.24	22.44	23.85	25.53	29.24	28.64	28.64	27.52	26.30	22.05	22.59	22.24	23.97	24.32	34.91	34.91	–
9	34.01	28.93	26.63	25.81	24.46	27.51	25.35	26.76	25.43	22.29	23.67	23.66	25.82	23.37	20.85	19.52	21.00	20.79	18.24	20.71	19.03	19.55	25.46	25.46	–
10	24.54	22.37	21.87	18.77	19.37	20.38	20.21	20.66	25.49	26.68	24.91	25.90	24.27	22.83	22.64	24.51	52.46	52.46	–						

Audience measurement performed by Nielsen Media Research (Note: The viewership statistics in the graph and table are sourced from the citations in the season-specific tables above.)
