= The One After Vegas =

- Friends episode
- Episode no.: Season 6 Episode 1
- Directed by: Kevin S. Bright
- Written by: Adam Chase
- Production code: 225551
- Original air date: September 23, 1999

Guest appearance
- Bill Stevenson as Rick

Episode chronology
← Previous "The One in Vegas"	Next → "The One Where Ross Hugs Rachel"
- Friends season 6

"The One After Vegas" is the sixth-season premiere of the American television situation comedy Friends, which was broadcast on NBC on September 23, 1999. The plot continues from the previous episode; after their drunken wedding in Las Vegas, Ross and Rachel plan a quick annulment, and Monica and Chandler discuss moving in together. A subplot has Joey and Phoebe driving back to New York from Vegas, picking up a hitchhiker on the way. The episode was directed by Kevin S. Bright, written by Adam Chase and its production was documented for a Discovery Channel program.

== Plot ==
Ross and Rachel wake up in bed together, immensely hungover and unaware that they got married the night before. Joey joins Phoebe for breakfast, telling her his movie has been canceled. Monica and Chandler arrive and separately confess to Phoebe and Joey that they were also planning to wed but now worry that the relationship is moving too fast. When Ross and Rachel arrive, the others tell them they are married. They decide to get an annulment, leading to a large number of jokes about Ross' failed marriages, much to his anger.

Joey asks Phoebe to go with him on the long drive back to New York, to stop him from being lonely. She agrees but she is annoyed when Joey spends several hours asleep while she drives, and they switch over. As Phoebe sleeps, Joey picks up a hitchhiker. Initially outraged, Phoebe soon strikes up a friendship with the man, and gives him her number when he leaves. Joey asks for her forgiveness and they play car games.

Still unsure of where their relationship is going, Monica and Chandler look for signs that they should get married. They grow increasingly alarmed when all the signs are positive, and eventually Chandler suggests he just move into Monica's apartment with her, which she agrees to. Ross tells Rachel that he does not want three failed marriages and attempts to convince her to change her mind about the annulment, but she refuses and pressures him to get the annulment. He concedes and later tells her he took care of it, but reveals to Phoebe that he lied: They are still married.

== Production ==
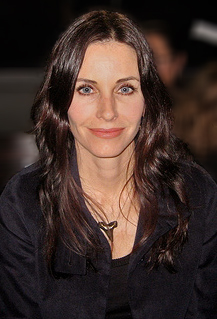
Courteney Cox had married David Arquette between seasons and Arquette was added to her name in the opening credits.

The new sets constructed for the previous episode were left standing over the summer hiatus, allowing the production team to resume filming on the Vegas sets with minimal disruption. A discussion was held during rehearsals about the ink Ross and Rachel had applied to each other's faces in the previous episode; dialogue had established that it was permanent and Marta Kauffman was keen to show it was still there in the scene where Ross and Rachel arrive at breakfast, albeit fainter than before. Others preferred that it was gone completely and this was what was shown in the scene as filmed. There was worry that people would not understand the joke that indicated Phoebe had married someone in a Vegas wedding, but a vox pop of the audience showed they did.

During editing, three minutes and 40 seconds were trimmed from the episode to bring it down to the appropriate running time of 22 minutes. Additional time was created for this and future episodes by shortening the theme tune from 45 seconds to 35. Production required 52 takes, 14 scenes and seven rewrites.

Between seasons, Cox married David Arquette, becoming Courteney Cox Arquette. An in-joke reference to this is made in the opening credits, where the rest of the cast have "Arquette" appended to their names. The dedication "For Courteney and David, who did get married" appears during the fade out to the tag scene.

Behind-the-scenes footage, along with talking heads by producers, writers and cast, was filmed for an episode of On the Inside, a Discovery Channel series. The programme was released in the United Kingdom in 2001 as part of a special "best of" VHS boxset. In 2004 it was included as an extra on the US season five DVD set, titled The One that Goes Behind the Scenes, as well as on The Best of Friends Volume Three and The Best of Friends Volume Four. It was re-released in the UK on the season ten DVD set under this same title.

== Reception ==
Entertainment Weekly rated the episode B+, praising Schwimmer and Aniston for spinning "new variations on Ross' and Rachel's twisted romantic fates" and citing the line "This is not a marriage—this is the world's worst hangover!" as the best line of the episode. The authors of Friends Like Us: The Unofficial Guide to Friends also mention this line, and praise the moments when Monica and Chandler act like newlyweds, however hard they try not to. They describe Ross's actions as "predictable" but wonder "just how far the writers will go before we all tire of Ross's self-centred, clinical logic trampling over the feelings of the very people he claims to love the most."

The episode was nominated for the Primetime Emmy Award for Outstanding Sound Mixing in a Comedy Series or Special at the 52nd Primetime Emmy Awards, but lost to an episode of Ally McBeal.
