= Friends season 5 =

Season of television series

Friends
- Season 5
- Friends season 5 DVD cover
- Showrunners: David Crane; Marta Kauffman
- Starring: Jennifer Aniston; Courteney Cox; Lisa Kudrow; Matt LeBlanc; Matthew Perry; David Schwimmer
- No. of episodes: 24

Release
- Original network: NBC
- Original release: September 24, 1998 – May 20, 1999

Season chronology
- ← Previous; Season 4 Next → Season 6

The fifth season of the American television sitcom Friends aired on NBC from September 24, 1998 to May 20, 1999.

== Cast and characters ==
=== Main cast ===
- Jennifer Aniston as Rachel Green
- Courteney Cox as Monica Geller
- Lisa Kudrow as Phoebe Buffay
- Matt LeBlanc as Joey Tribbiani
- Matthew Perry as Chandler Bing
- David Schwimmer as Ross Geller

=== Recurring cast ===
- James Michael Tyler as Gunther
- Helen Baxendale as Emily Waltham Geller
- George Newbern as Danny
- Michael Ensign as Dr. Donald Ledbetter
- Michael Rapaport as Gary
- Tom Selleck as Dr. Richard Burke

=== Guest stars ===
- Maggie Wheeler as Janice Litman
- Elliott Gould as Jack Geller
- Christina Pickles as Judy Geller
- Jane Sibbett as Carol Willick Bunch
- Jessica Hecht as Susan Bunch
- Giovanni Ribisi as Frank Buffay, Jr.
- Debra Jo Rupp as Alice Knight Buffay
- Morgan Fairchild as Nora Bing
- June Gable as Estelle Leonard
- Bob Balaban as Frank Buffay, Sr.
- Tom Conti as Steven Waltham
- Jennifer Saunders as Andrea Waltham
- Zen Gesner as Dave
- Sam Anderson as Dr. Harad
- Patrick Fabian as Dan
- T.J. Thyne as Dr. Oberman
- Gregory Sporleder as Larry
- Iqbal Theba as Joey's doctor
- Gary Collins as himself
- Sam McMurray as Doug
- Lise Simms as Kara
- Soleil Moon Frye as Katie
- Willie Garson as Steve
- Joanna Gleason as Kim Clozzi
- Kristin Dattilo as Caitlin
- Lilyan Chauvin as Grandma Tribbiani
- Megan Ward as Nancy
- Thomas Lennon as Randall
- Jeanette Miller as the elderly woman
- Samantha Smith as Jen
- Lee Arenberg as The Man

== Episodes ==
No. overall	No. in season	Title	Directed by	Written by	Original release date	Prod. code	U.S. viewers (millions)	Rating/share (18–49)
98	1	"The One After Ross Says Rachel"	Kevin S. Bright	Seth Kurland	September 24, 1998	467651	31.12	16.6/46
After Ross mistakenly says Rachel's name instead of Emily's at the altar, she runs off and goes into hiding. Monica and Chandler, desperate to hook up again, are unable to find a suitable place. Rachel debates whether she should confront Ross about her feelings. Ross goes to the airport hoping Emily will show up so they can go on their honeymoon. He runs into Rachel, who is on standby for a flight home. When it appears Emily is not coming, Ross persuades Rachel to go with him instead. Emily shows up at the airport, but seeing Rachel getting on the plane, she runs off again with Ross chasing after her. Rachel, waiting for Ross to board the plane, ends up going to Greece alone.
99	2	"The One with All the Kissing"	Gary Halvorson	Wil Calhoun	October 1, 1998	467652	25.36	13.3/40
Rachel returns from Greece, telling Ross she had a great time but is actually livid that he abandoned her on the plane. Ross attempts to reconcile with Emily, who refuses to speak to him. Rachel wants Monica to make all her romance decisions, but ultimately ignores her. Once back home, Monica and Chandler are caught kissing, so Chandler kisses all the girls to cover up their budding relationship. Phoebe feels left out when the other friends talk non-stop about their London trip. Feeling guilty over this, the gang plans a weekend trip to Atlantic City, but just as they are about to leave, Phoebe's water breaks, so instead they head to the hospital.
100	3	"The One Hundredth"	Kevin S. Bright	David Crane & Marta Kauffman	October 8, 1998	467653	26.82	N/A
In an attempt to get over Ross, Rachel asks out two male nurses for her and Monica. This causes friction between Monica and Chandler, with Chandler reacting as if he does not care. In the delivery room, Phoebe frets about her Fonzie-obsessed doctor. Joey, who they think is only experiencing sympathy pain from Phoebe's labor, is diagnosed with kidney stones and admitted to the hospital. After giving birth to Frank and Alice's triplets: Frank Jr. Jr, Leslie, and Chandler, Phoebe has difficulty giving them up.
101	4	"The One Where Phoebe Hates PBS"	Shelley Jensen	Michael Curtis	October 15, 1998	467654	24.09	12.7/38
Chandler starts behaving rather arrogantly after learning Monica thinks he is the best sex she has ever had. Phoebe does her best to find a selfless good deed. Ross finally contacts Emily to try and work things out. She agrees to come to New York, but only if Ross agrees never to see Rachel. Joey lands a job on a PBS telethon, much to Phoebe's disapproval, who believes there is no such thing as a selfless good deed.
102	5	"The One with the Kips"	Dana DeVally Piazza	Scott Silveri	October 29, 1998	467655	25.87	13.5/38
Ross tells Rachel that Emily does not want him to see her anymore. Rachel then worries she will be phased out of the group entirely, much like Chandler's old roommate, Kip, and seeks advice from Phoebe. Monica and Chandler sneak away for a weekend together and end up fighting. Joey eventually figures out the truth about their relationship, though they swear him to secrecy.
103	6	"The One with the Yeti"	Gary Halvorson	Alexa Junge	November 5, 1998	467656	24.99	13.1/36
Phoebe's mother sends her a fur coat, causing her to rethink her views. Emily's demands on Ross become more unreasonable, annoying his friends, and causing him to make a huge decision about his marriage. Monica and Rachel encounter what they think is a yeti man in the storage room leading to them fogging him with bug spray. Joey later explains that they fogged Danny, who just moved into their building. Rachel and Monica go to his apartment to apologize for fogging him, though he brushes them off.
104	7	"The One Where Ross Moves In"	Gary Halvorson	Gigi McCreery & Perry Rein	November 12, 1998	467657	24.44	12.9/36
Rachel tries acting aloof with Danny, despite liking him. Phoebe begins dating Larry, a health inspector, but the friends are annoyed when he shuts down all their favorite restaurants after eating there. When Emily's cousin evicts Ross from the apartment he sublets to him, Joey and Chandler invite him to move in with them; his personal habits soon prove annoying.
105	8	"The One with the Thanksgiving Flashbacks"	Kevin S. Bright	Gregory S. Malins	November 19, 1998	467658	23.92	12.4/35
Monica cooks Thanksgiving dinner. After, everyone shared stories of their worst-ever Thanksgivings: Chandler learned of his parents' divorce; Joey got a raw turkey stuck on his head; newly-thin, teen-aged Monica accidentally cut off the tip of Chandler's toe with a sharp knife after he called her fat the previous year.
106	9	"The One with Ross' Sandwich"	Gary Halvorson	Ted Cohen & Andrew Reich	December 10, 1998	467659	23.03	11.9/35
Phoebe takes a literature course and regrets bringing Rachel, who does not take the class seriously. Joey tires of covering up Monica and Chandler's secret relationship. After creating a big fuss when Ross discovers that someone at work ate his sandwich, he is forced to take time off from work to deal with his anger issues after his marriage ends. Monica and Chandler silently beg Joey to maintain their secret after the other friends notice strange goings-on and think Joey is a pervert. Joey agrees but only by claiming that all the odd behavior is because he and Monica slept together in London, humiliating Monica.
107	10	"The One with the Inappropriate Sister"	Dana DeVally Piazza	Shana Goldberg-Meehan	December 17, 1998	467660	23.67	12.0/36
During his sabbatical, a bored Ross encourages Joey to write his own screenplay, ultimately causing friction between Chandler and Ross. Phoebe becomes overly aggressive collecting money for the poor in the run-up to Christmas. Monica sets Rachel up on a date with Danny, but Rachel quickly loses interest after Danny and his sister act overly affectionate with one another.
108	11	"The One with All the Resolutions"	Joe Regalbuto	Story by : Brian Boyle; Teleplay by : Suzie Villandry	January 7, 1999	467661	27.02	14.2/37
The gang makes New Year resolutions: Rachel promises to stop gossiping; Monica tries to take more pictures of the group and be less fastidious; Phoebe wants to pilot a commercial aircraft; Joey wants to learn the guitar; Chandler must stop making jokes; and Ross wants to try something new each day. Phoebe's attempt to teach Joey the guitar ends badly. Ross encounters a problem when he wears a new pair of leather pants on a first date. Rachel receives a shock when she picks up the phone and overhears a conversation between Monica and Chandler.
109	12	"The One with Chandler's Work Laugh"	Kevin S. Bright	Alicia Sky Varinaitis	January 21, 1999	467662	24.82	13.3/35
Monica is dismayed by how Chandler kisses up to his boss at work. Rachel tries to get Monica to confess her secret about Chandler, but Monica is unwilling to confide anything. Ross learns Emily is engaged again, and has a one-night stand with someone the group is all too familiar with, Janice. Later, Janice breaks up with Ross, unable to stand his perpetual whining. Ross asks Chandler to forgive him for sleeping with his ex, believing it breaks a friendship rule. Chandler is amused, but realizes he can leverage that in case Ross becomes upset when he eventually finds out about him and Monica.
110	13	"The One with Joey's Bag"	Gail Mancuso	Story by : Michael Curtis; Teleplay by : Seth Kurland	February 4, 1999	467663	24.92	13.2/36
Phoebe's grandmother dies, and she is shocked when her father, Frank, comes to the funeral. Wanting to know more about him, she arranges an encounter without revealing her identity. Joey wants to look stylish for an upcoming audition, so Rachel helps out, styling him with a "man's bag" as an accessory. Joey loves the bag, but everyone else considers it a purse. Monica is upset that Chandler dislikes her massages, which he finds extremely painful.
111	14	"The One Where Everybody Finds Out"	Michael Lembeck	Alexa Junge	February 11, 1999	467664	27.70	15.0/41
Ross applies for Ugly Naked Guy's apartment when he moves out, only to find there is fierce competition. While viewing the apartment with Ross, Rachel and Phoebe happen to see Monica and Chandler through the window, having sex. Joey is relieved that everyone except Ross finally knows and he no longer has to pretend, but Rachel and Phoebe want to have some fun by forcing them into confessing. Rachel suggests Ross strike up an acquaintance with Ugly Naked Guy by finding similar interests to win his apartment, causing Ross to employ an extreme method. Chandler and Monica finally confess they love each other, but want to keep it secret from Ross a while longer...but Ross soon finds out, causing another emotional outburst in front of his boss who just cleared him to return to work.
112	15	"The One with the Girl Who Hits Joey"	Kevin S. Bright	Adam Chase	February 18, 1999	467665	29.31	15.3/40
Ross is initially furious upon learning about Chandler and Monica, but quickly comes around when he learns they are serious about each other. Joey dates a girl (Soleil Moon Frye) who likes playfully punching him. Ross gets off on the wrong foot with his new neighbors when he reasonably declines contributing a large sum towards the retiring superintendent's retirement party. Chandler and Monica have problems with their relationship after everyone jokes about marriage. Monica is upset that Chandler refuses to consider marriage, and he becomes so worried about losing her that he hastily proposes. Monica turns him down, saying she only wants him to be open to getting married one day, and that they are not ready yet.
113	16	"The One with the Cop"	Andrew Tsao	Story by : Alicia Sky Varinaitis; Teleplay by : Gigi McCreery & Perry Rein	February 25, 1999	467666	26.02	13.9/37
Phoebe finds a police badge at the coffeehouse and has fun pretending to be a cop – until she pulls it on the owner, a cop named Gary (Michael Rapaport). He later asks her out for dinner. Ross buys a new couch, but refuses to pay the huge delivery charge. Ross soon wishes he had paid the fee as he and Rachel struggle to get the couch up to his apartment. Joey is upset after having a romantic dream about Monica. However, Monica assures him it is only because he wants a serious relationship similar to Monica and Chandler's.
114	17	"The One with Rachel's Inadvertent Kiss"	Shelley Jensen	Andrew Reich & Ted Cohen	March 18, 1999	467667	24.48	12.7/35
Rachel interviews with Ralph Lauren and accidentally kisses her interviewer and prospective boss – Mr. Zelner. Monica wants to prove that she and Chandler are a hotter couple than Phoebe and her new boyfriend, Gary. Joey flirts with a girl who lives across the street in Ross' building. When he goes to meet her, he cannot find her apartment and continually ends up at Ross' door, having miscalculated the floor number. Eventually Monica helps him find the apartment only to find Ross in the girl's apartment (whom the girl met earlier and with whom she goes out).
115	18	"The One Where Rachel Smokes"	Todd Holland	Michael Curtis	April 8, 1999	467668	21.88	11.8/38
Rachel attempts smoking to feel more included at work with her boss and co-worker. Joey auditions for a soup commercial with Ben playing his son. When the director pairs Ben with another father, Joey is left in the uncomfortable position of competing with his friend's son. Monica and Phoebe plan Rachel's birthday party, but when Monica takes over, leaving Phoebe in charge of only cups and ice, Phoebe goes all out.
116	19	"The One Where Ross Can't Flirt"	Gail Mancuso	Doty Abrams	April 22, 1999	467669	20.85	10.9/36
Rachel secretly helps out Ross after he botches flirting with the pizza delivery girl. Joey invites his grandmother over to watch his role on Law & Order – but when his part has been cut, he quickly improvises his own two-minute role and sneaks in the video for everyone to watch. Monica asks Phoebe for a pair of earrings she loaned her, but Phoebe lent them to Rachel, who lost one.
117	20	"The One with the Ride-Along"	Gary Halvorson	Shana Goldberg-Meehan & Seth Kurland	April 29, 1999	467670	19.63	10.8/34
The boys go on a ride-along with Phoebe's cop boyfriend, Gary. Mistaking a car backfiring for the sound of gunshots, Joey throws himself onto Ross, attempting to protect his meatball sandwich. Chandler then thinks Joey cares more about Ross than him. Meanwhile, while borrowing margarita ingredients from Ross' apartment, Rachel overhears Emily leaving a message saying she is having doubts about going through with her wedding and wants Ross to consider them getting back together. When Rachel accidentally deletes the message, she agonizes over telling Ross.
118	21	"The One with the Ball"	Gary Halvorson	Story by : Scott Silveri; Teleplay by : Gregory S. Malins	May 6, 1999	467671	20.92	11.2/36
Phoebe freaks out after learning Gary is planning to ask her to move in with him, which she is not ready for. Phoebe reluctantly agrees to move in, however the relationship quickly ends when Gary shoots a bird tweeting outside the bedroom window. Rachel buys a hairless Sphynx cat for $1,000 but quickly regrets her purchase when everyone mocks it and the cat continually hisses at and scratches her. She eventually unloads the creature on Gunther, making a profit. Ross and Joey pass time by tossing a ball back and forth, and subsequently try to see how long they can go without dropping the ball. Monica joins in, then Chandler, who is called a 'Dropper', joins in.
119	22	"The One with Joey's Big Break"	Gary Halvorson	Story by : Shana Goldberg-Meehan; Teleplay by : Wil Calhoun	May 13, 1999	467672	21.28	11.2/35
Joey lands a role in an independent movie, then borrows Phoebe's taxicab to drive to the Las Vegas location. Chandler rides along but learns that Joey will not get paid unless the movie is successful. He remarks that he does not think the movie will be Joey's big break. Furious, Joey kicks Chandler out, stranding him on the George Washington Bridge. Chandler later phones Joey and apologizes, though Joey does not tell Chandler that he was right. Production has been canceled because of insufficient funds forcing Joey to get a job at Caesars Palace as a gladiator. Meanwhile, Rachel has an eye infection but resists using the prescribed eye drops; Phoebe is angry at Ross and refuses to make up, leaving it to Ross to figure out what he did, only to discover Phoebe dreamed it.
120	23	"The One in Vegas"	Kevin S. Bright	Ted Cohen & Andrew Reich	May 20, 1999 (Note: These episodes originally aired as a single double-length episode but are sometimes split into two episodes for syndication, reruns and DVD presentation.)	467673	25.90	14.2/42
121	24	"The One in Vegas"	Kevin S. Bright	Gregory S. Malins & Scott Silveri	May 20, 1999	467674	25.90	14.2/42
Monica has lunch with Richard but does not tell Chandler, who eventually finds out, ruining their anniversary. The gang goes to Las Vegas to visit Joey. Monica, Chandler, and Phoebe find him working at Caesars Palace while his movie is shut down. Ross sees Rachel naked through his apartment window, mistaking it as an invitation to "the physical act of love". On the plane to Vegas, Ross and Rachel needle each other; he draws a mustache on her with a marker pen while she is asleep. In Vegas, Ross and Rachel get drunk. Joey discovers his "identical hand twin" that he believes is a money-making opportunity to fund his movie. Phoebe feuds with a slots "lurker" and gets ejected from the casino, though she returns as "Regina Phalange". Chandler and Monica decide to get married. At the wedding chapel, Ross and Rachel drunkenly stumble out of the chapel ahead of them.

== Home media ==
The Complete Fifth Season
Set details			Special features
23 episodes (1 double-length episode); 4-disc set (DVD); 2 discs (Blu-ray); 1.33:1 aspect ratio; Languages: English (Dolby Digital 5.0, with subtitles); Spanish (Dolby Digital); French (Dolby Digital); 561 minutes (DVD); 532 minutes (Blu-ray)			Over 30 minutes of Never-Before-Seen footage included on every episode. (DVD Only); Producers commentary on three episodes: "The One Hundredth", "The One with All the Thanksgivings", and "The One Where Everybody Finds Out"; Hour-long Discovery Channel documentary, "The One That Goes Behind the Scenes"; "Friends: On Location in London" behind the scenes featurette; "Gunther Spills the Beans" promotional for next season; Easter eggs
Release dates			Over 30 minutes of Never-Before-Seen footage included on every episode. (DVD Only); Producers commentary on three episodes: "The One Hundredth", "The One with All the Thanksgivings", and "The One Where Everybody Finds Out"; Hour-long Discovery Channel documentary, "The One That Goes Behind the Scenes"; "Friends: On Location in London" behind the scenes featurette; "Gunther Spills the Beans" promotional for next season; Easter eggs
Region 1	Region 2	Region 4	Over 30 minutes of Never-Before-Seen footage included on every episode. (DVD Only); Producers commentary on three episodes: "The One Hundredth", "The One with All the Thanksgivings", and "The One Where Everybody Finds Out"; Hour-long Discovery Channel documentary, "The One That Goes Behind the Scenes"; "Friends: On Location in London" behind the scenes featurette; "Gunther Spills the Beans" promotional for next season; Easter eggs
November 4, 2003	May 29, 2000	October 4, 2006	Over 30 minutes of Never-Before-Seen footage included on every episode. (DVD Only); Producers commentary on three episodes: "The One Hundredth", "The One with All the Thanksgivings", and "The One Where Everybody Finds Out"; Hour-long Discovery Channel documentary, "The One That Goes Behind the Scenes"; "Friends: On Location in London" behind the scenes featurette; "Gunther Spills the Beans" promotional for next season; Easter eggs

== Reception ==
Collider ranked the season Number 2 on their ranking of all ten Friends seasons, and named "The One Where Everybody Finds Out" as its standout episode.
