= The One Hundredth =

- Friends episode
- Episode no.: Season 5 Episode 3
- Directed by: Kevin S. Bright
- Written by: David Crane & Marta Kauffman
- Production code: 467653
- Original air date: October 8, 1998

Guest appearances
- Sam Anderson as Dr. Harad; Heidi Beck as The Delivery Room Nurse; Patrick Fabian as Dan; Brenda Issacs-Booth as The Nurse; Giovanni Ribisi as Frank Jr.; Iqbal Theba as Joey's Doctor; T. J. Thyne as Dr. Oberman; Debra Jo Rupp as Alice

Episode chronology
← Previous "The One with All the Kissing"	Next → "The One Where Phoebe Hates PBS"
- Friends season 5

"The One Hundredth" (also known as "The One with the Triplets") is the third episode of Friends' fifth season and 100th episode overall. It first aired on the NBC network in the United States on October 8, 1998. Continuing from the previous episode, the group arrive at the hospital after Phoebe (Lisa Kudrow) goes into labor and gives birth to her half brother Frank's (Giovanni Ribisi) and his wife Alice's (Debra Jo Rupp) triplets. Meanwhile, Rachel (Jennifer Aniston) tries to set Monica (Courteney Cox) and herself up with two male nurses, which causes problems between Monica and Chandler (Matthew Perry), and Ross (David Schwimmer) supports Joey (Matt LeBlanc) as he experiences kidney stones.

The episode was directed by Kevin S. Bright and co-written by series creators David Crane & Marta Kauffman. The producers wanted to mark the landmark episode with a major event, choosing to bring a culmination to Phoebe's surrogacy storyline. Earlier scripts had the character insistent on keeping hold of the babies, with the writers later deciding it would be better off having a sendoff, to keep it dramatic. In its original broadcast on NBC, "The One Hundredth" acquired a 17.7 Nielsen rating, finishing the week ranked second and received good reviews since airing.

== Plot ==
Phoebe arrives at the hospital with the group, where she tells the nurse at the desk that she is in labor. In Phoebe's hospital room, Ross and Rachel enter with bad news: her doctor fell and hit her head in the shower, meaning she is unable to make it to the birth. The replacement doctor, Dr. Harad, assures Phoebe that she is in good hands, though he spontaneously declares his admiration for Fonzie from Happy Days several times. Phoebe demands that Ross find her another doctor, but when the replacement Dr. Oberman (T. J. Thyne) is too young for her liking, Dr. Harad returns. She moreover begs Rachel to talk to her brother Frank, to try and convince him to let her keep one of the triplets, after having second thoughts over the surrogate process. In the delivery room, Phoebe gives birth to a boy and two girls. Rachel breaks the news to Phoebe that she will not be able to keep one of the babies. Phoebe asks her friends to leave, in order to have a moment alone with the triplets. She tells the babies she wishes she could take them home and see them every day, but she will settle for being their favorite aunt, and the four of them cry together.

Rachel informs Monica that she has found two male nurses who are interested in going out on date with them. Monica declines the offer at first, not wanting to jeopardize her secret relationship with Chandler, but when he annoys her by categorizing their relationship as "just goofing around", Monica decides to date nurse Dan (Patrick Fabian) after all. After Phoebe gives birth, Chandler approaches Monica in a hallway to ask if she is really going to date Dan, to which Monica retorts that she is also "goofing around". Remorseful, Chandler informs Monica that the "technical" definition of the term is "two friends who care a lot about each other, and have amazing sex, and just want to spend more time together". Monica is mollified by his words and calls off her date with Dan.

Meanwhile, Joey is in a hospital room of his own after learning that he is suffering from kidney stones. As they are too close to his bladder, Joey is given two options: wait until he passes them naturally, or have a procedure, which he finds too invasive. Opting for the former, he gives "birth" to the kidney stones, concurrent with Phoebe's birth.

== Production ==
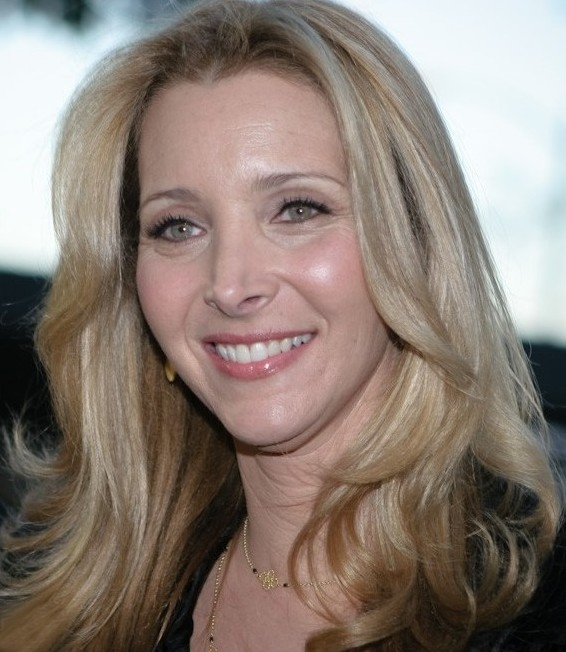
The episode brought a culmination to the surrogate plot, involving Lisa Kudrow's character Phoebe.

"The One Hundredth" was co-written by show creators David Crane and Marta Kauffman and directed by Kevin S. Bright. The episode takes place in a hospital, meaning none of the usual filming sets were used, thus surprising several members of the audience. Crane commented that the hundredth episode was a "big milestone" for the series and to mark the major event, Lisa Kudrow's character Phoebe would give birth to triplets. This brought a culmination to the surrogacy story arc, which began in the fourth season; it was developed to accommodate Lisa Kudrow's real life pregnancy. When Kudrow accepted the surrogate mother storyline, the idea of having more than one baby was "comically funny" to Kauffman, and giving birth to triplets or "their brother's children" was something never seen on television. Phoebe's pregnancy gave the writers incredible license for her to "be just outrageously mean and still have it be funny". In order to prepare for the labor and birthing scenes, Kauffman watched a video of her cousin giving birth.

In earlier drafts of the episode, the idea of Phoebe keeping one of the babies was more extreme. The writers decided instead they were better off having the character saying goodbye to keep it dramatic. The birth scenes were recorded in advance to deal with light sensitivity and noise issues. Heidi Beck, a professional nurse was retained; she acquired a stop watch for every minute the baby was under the light. Real life triplets were used and coated with grape jelly as an alternative to vernix. In the final scene, dolls were employed as it was filmed in front of the studio audience.

The main subplot involved Monica and Chandler discussing their relationship. The writers felt they needed an additional subplot, involving Joey going through a parallel experience to Phoebe's pregnancy—the difference being him "giving birth" to a kidney stone. This meant doing research on the condition, finding it "really disturbing stuff". Matt LeBlanc and Matthew Perry had a difficult time filming the prognosis scene as actor Iqbal Theba, who played Joey's doctor, pronounced 'kidney stone' in a humorous manner.

== Reception ==
In its original American broadcast, "The One Hundredth" finished second in ratings for the week of October 5–11, 1998, with a Nielsen rating of 17.7. It was the second-highest rated show on the NBC network that week after ER. In the United Kingdom the episode premiered on Sky1 on January 21, 1999, and was watched by 2.17 million viewers, making the program the most watched on the channel that week.

Entertainment Weekly rated the episode "B", in its review of the fifth season. It criticized the "Arthur Fonzarelli-obsessed obstetrician," plot, though going on to praise Phoebe's "sweet interaction" with the newborn babies. Robert Bianco of USA Today felt the episode made use of the entire ensemble, noting "Phoebe's predictably and humorously off-center response to labor" being the highlight. Colin Jacobson of DVD Movie Guide disapproved of Ribisi's performance, adding "Ultimately, "One Hundredth" had some good moments, but it wasn't a great episode."

"The One Hundredth" was Kudrow's favorite episode of the series. She liked the episode as "it was nice that Phoebe could play such a big part in something as momentous as the 100th episode".
