= The One Where Everybody Finds Out =

- Friends episode
- Episode no.: Season 5 Episode 14
- Directed by: Michael Lembeck
- Written by: Alexa Junge
- Production code: 467664
- Original air date: February 11, 1999

Guest appearances
- Michael Ensign as Dr. Ledbetter; Jon Haugen as Ugly Naked Guy (uncredited)

Episode chronology
← Previous "The One with Joey's Bag"	Next → "The One with the Girl Who Hits Joey"
- Friends season 5

"The One Where Everybody Finds Out" is the fourteenth episode of Friends' fifth season. It first aired on the NBC network in the United States on February 11, 1999. In the episode, Phoebe Buffay discovers that Monica Geller and Chandler Bing are secretly dating, and decides to "mess" with them by pretending to flirt with Chandler. Meanwhile, Ross Geller learns that "Ugly Naked Guy" is subletting his apartment and applies for it. The episode ends on a cliffhanger, with Ross witnessing Monica and Chandler having sex through a window, which would be resolved in the next episode.

At the 51st Primetime Emmy Awards, it received three nominations for Outstanding Directing for a Comedy Series, Outstanding Writing for a Comedy Series and Outstanding Supporting Actress in a Comedy Series.

== Plot ==
The gang observes that "Ugly Naked Guy", who lives across the street from them, is moving out. Ross (David Schwimmer), who has lived in Joey (Matt LeBlanc) and Chandler's (Matthew Perry) apartment since his botched wedding with Emily, wonders if he should try to get Ugly Naked Guy's apartment. He, Rachel (Jennifer Aniston) and Phoebe (Lisa Kudrow) visit it, and Ross is enthralled, but while he goes for an application, the girls see Chandler and Monica (Courteney Cox) having sex in Monica's apartment. Though initially shocked, Phoebe calms down after Joey and Rachel reveal the two have been together since hooking up at Ross' wedding. Joey, who has been keeping the secret for several months, is relieved that almost everyone knows. However, Rachel and Phoebe want revenge, and decide to mess with the duo by having Phoebe pretend to be attracted to Chandler. Chandler later informs a skeptical Monica that Phoebe was flirting with him.

Upon discovering that Ugly Naked Guy is subletting the apartment himself, Ross attempts to bribe him with a basket of mini-muffins. However, many people have already bribed him with extravagant gifts such as a pinball machine and a mountain bike. Ross meets with Ugly Naked Guy and they eat the mini-muffins whilst nude, which wins him Ugly Naked Guy's favor and the sublet. (Note: Extended scene from the original broadcast and DVD version, but not present in syndication or streaming.)

Monica overhears Phoebe flirting with Chandler, and realizes he was telling the truth. However, she also realizes that Phoebe knows about their relationship and is just trying to mess with them. They confront Joey, who inadvertently reveals Rachel knows as well. Chandler and Monica decide to turn the tables by having Chandler reciprocate Phoebe's advances; to which Rachel and Phoebe realize what the couple are doing and proceed to up the stakes. The game of chicken between the two culminates with Chandler and Phoebe going on a tense date in Chandler and Joey's apartment while Monica hides in the bathroom and Rachel and Joey eavesdrop in the hallway. After Phoebe and Chandler share an awkward kiss, Chandler finally breaks down and reveals he is in love with Monica. Monica reveals that she is also in love with Chandler, shocking Phoebe who thought they were only in a casual relationship. Joey is relieved that he no longer has to keep their relationship a secret. However, the others inform him that they still have to keep it a secret from Ross, much to his chagrin.

In the closing credits scene, Ross shows his new apartment to his boss, Dr. Ledbetter, to try convince him that he no longer suffers from anger management issues. However, he then sees Monica and Chandler kissing through the window, causing him to angrily yell "Get off my sister!"

== Production ==
What sticks out to me, was trying to write it and see how many twists we could make without getting confused.

— Marta Kauffman

Monica and Chandler's relationship was first introduced in "The One with Ross's Wedding". The audience reaction to the plot twist was unexpectedly positive, with the studio audience applauding the twist for 27 seconds. Creator Marta Kauffman stated that, "When we were shooting the scene in London where we find out that Monica and Chandler have slept together, we were in front of a live audience and the reaction was so stunning.... We didn't expect applause to last for two minutes. We kind of went, "Huh, this is such an unexpected duo, let's play with it for a little while."

For the scene in which Joey opens Phoebe's top, Lembeck commented that "As Matt talked through what he wanted to do, it became a technical exercise: Show the costumer what you want to do and see if she can rig the dress."

== Reception ==
At the 51st Primetime Emmy Awards, the episode received three nominations – Kudrow was nominated for Outstanding Supporting Actress in a Comedy Series, Lembeck for Outstanding Directing for a Comedy Series and Junge for Outstanding Writing for a Comedy Series. At the 52nd Writers Guild of America Awards, the episode was nominated for Episodic Comedy.

Entertainment Weekly gave the episode an A−, saying "although the group discovery would have been riveting enough, the ensuing rondelet of one-upmanship between Monica and Chandler and Rachel and Phoebe is pure genius". IGN described the scene in which Chandler and Phoebe kiss as a "gold star Friends moment." HuffPost praised it for being "gooey and romantic and slapstick-y all at once." They also called the line "They don't know we know they know we know", spoken by Phoebe, the best in the episode. The A.V. Club wrote that while it was "not the most natural point of entry for a first-time Friends viewer, given how much it leans on backstory", it was "as expertly crafted as anything in the show's 10-season run" and "builds to a frenzy, locking Phoebe and Chandler in a cruel game of chicken to see how far he and Monica will go to conceal their relationship."

Various websites have deemed it one of the show's best episodes. Digital Spy ranked it the third best episode of the show, praising Perry and Kudrow's performances as a "tour de force". Radio Times named it the fourth-funniest Friends episode. GamesRadar+ regarded it as the show's fifth-best episode, as they felt it delivered "huge laughs every step of the way." They called the line "What are you doing? Get off my sister!" the best of the episode. Purple Clover chose the episode as one of the 20 funniest episodes of Friends. Den of Geek ranked it the second best episode of Friends.

The episode holds a 9.7 rating on IMDb, making it the highest rated episode of the entire series, tied with "The Last One, Part 2".
