= The One with All the Thanksgivings =

- Friends episode
- Episode no.: Season 5 Episode 8
- Directed by: Kevin S. Bright
- Written by: Gregory S. Malins
- Production code: 467659
- Original air date: November 19, 1998

Guest appearances
- Elliott Gould as Jack Geller; Christina Pickles as Judy Geller; Morgan Fairchild as Nora Tyler Bing; Douglas Looper as The Paramedic; Joshua Preston as Young Chandler; Alec Mapa as The Housekeeper; Michael Winters as the Doctor

Episode chronology
← Previous "The One Where Ross Moves In"	Next → "The One with Ross's Sandwich"
- Friends season 5

"The One with All the Thanksgivings" (also known as "The One with the Thanksgiving Flashbacks") is the eighth episode of the fifth season of Friends. It first aired on the NBC network in the United States on November 19, 1998. In the episode, the main characters spend Thanksgiving at Monica's (Courteney Cox) apartment and recount their worst Thanksgivings.

The episode was directed by Kevin S. Bright and written by Gregory S. Malins. It guest-stars Elliott Gould and Christina Pickles as Jack and Judy Geller, with a cameo appearance by Morgan Fairchild as Nora Tyler Bing. The idea was conceived by the writers, who suggested short stories about the "worst Thanksgivings ever". A flashback approach was incorporated as the producers realized the audience responded well to it, despite concern the episode might be confused for a clip show.

In its original broadcast the episode reached a 16.0 Nielsen rating and finished the week ranked second. The episode earned Debra McGuire a Primetime Emmy Award nomination for Outstanding Costume Design for a Series. Since airing, it frequently ranks high in polls about the series' best episode.

== Synopsis ==
Ross (David Schwimmer) complains that his divorce and eviction means he is having the worst Thanksgiving ever. This prompts the others to compare their own "worst" Thanksgivings, starting with Chandler (Matthew Perry) reminding the rest that he learned his parents were divorcing. Phoebe (Lisa Kudrow) then claims she lost an arm on Thanksgiving as an American Civil War nurse, but Ross objects to stories from "past lives".

When Rachel (Jennifer Aniston) says she knows Monica's (Courteney Cox) worst Thanksgiving, Phoebe assumes she means Thanksgiving 1992, when Joey (Matt LeBlanc) got Monica's turkey stuck on his head in an attempt to scare Chandler. Monica counters with her actual worst Thanksgiving. In 1987, when Monica and Rachel were in high school, Ross and Chandler, newly roommates, arrive from college to spend Thanksgiving with Ross and Monica's parents. Monica develops a crush on Chandler and cooks macaroni and cheese for him after learning he does not eat Thanksgiving food; Chandler's compliments inspire her to become a chef. When Ross learns that Rachel has been dumped by her then-boyfriend, he asks Chandler to stay overnight in the hopes of getting a date with her, but Chandler refuses to be stuck with Ross's "fat sister". Monica overhears the comment, breaks down in tears and storms out.

In the present, Chandler apologizes to Monica for calling her fat, but Rachel admits that she thought Monica's worst Thanksgiving was the following year. In 1988, Ross and Chandler arrive for Thanksgiving at the Gellers once again to find that Monica has slimmed down, and Chandler now finds her attractive. Monica tells Rachel that she wants to humiliate Chandler for calling her fat, so Rachel suggests tricking him into taking off his clothes. Monica tries to seduce Chandler by awkwardly rubbing various objects against her skin, including a knife. She accidentally drops the knife, severing Chandler's toe. When the family brings him to the hospital to have it reattached, Monica discovers she accidentally grabbed a piece of carrot instead of his toe.

Chandler becomes upset after learning that he lost his toe because he called Monica fat, and angrily leaves. To make amends, Monica visits Chandler at his apartment with a turkey stuck on her head. When Chandler amicably rebuffs her, she adds a large pair of sunglasses and a fez, then dances. Chandler relents, but then accidentally admits that he loves her. As Chandler frantically attempts to retract his admission and Monica gleefully teases him about it, Joey arrives at the door and is scared by the turkey.

Over the credits, Phoebe is depicted as a nurse in a World War I field hospital, where she again loses an arm.

== Production ==
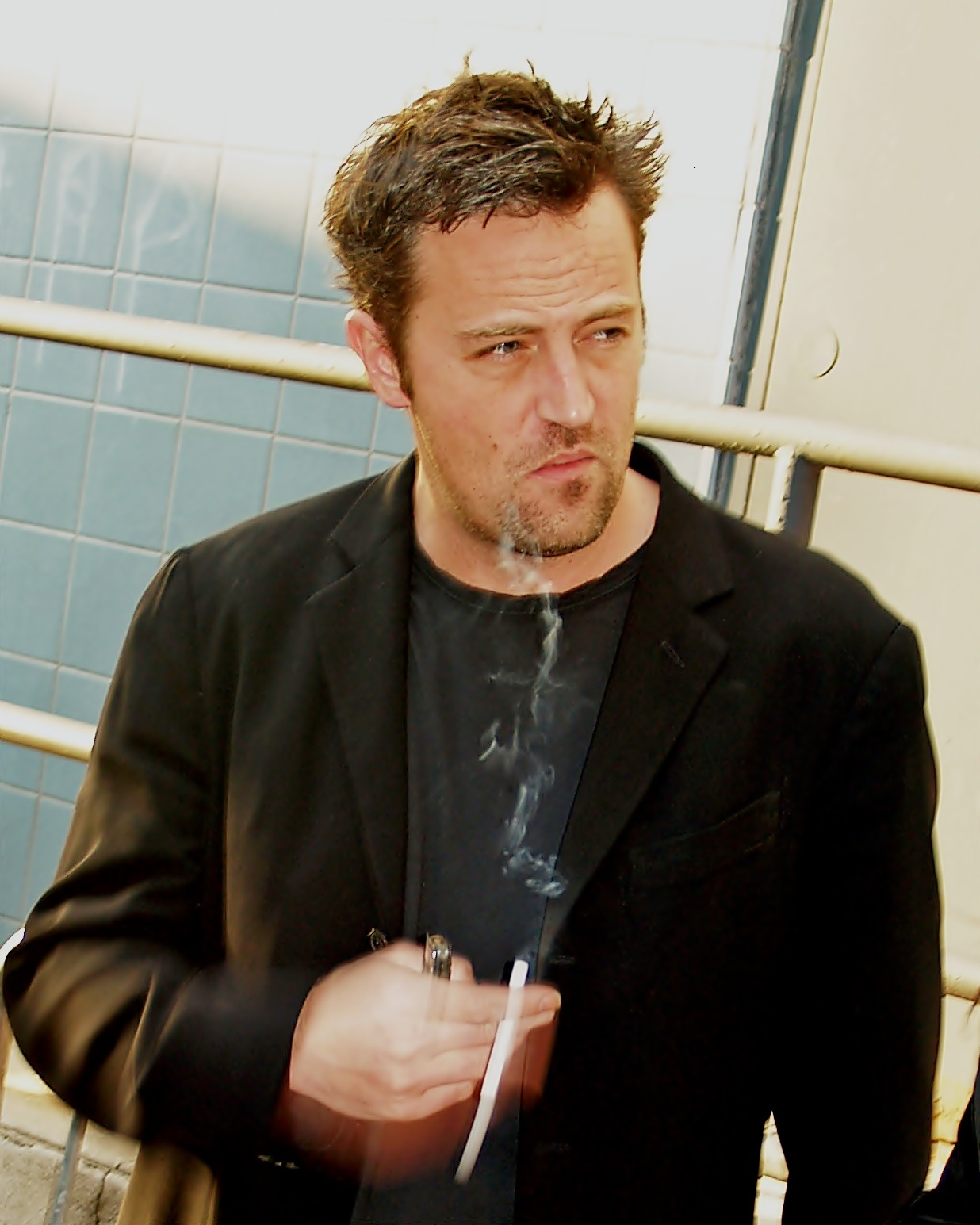
In the episode, Matthew Perry's character Chandler tells Monica for the first time that he loves her.

"The One with All the Thanksgivings" was written by Gregory S. Malins and directed by Kevin S. Bright. It is the fifth Thanksgiving special in the Friends series. The producers knew from past recordings that the audience responded well to seeing "the Friends as they were" and decided to incorporate a flashback episode into a Thanksgiving special. Show creator David Crane considered the Thanksgiving-themed episode as the "hallmark show" in each season. Marta Kauffman added dialogue centering on six characters being together in a room made the holiday special work. When discussing story ideas, the writers decided to create "a bunch of little pieces", until someone suggested "what if it's the worst Thanksgivings?", later used as the hook. Working on a flashback meant the episode needed "to have meaning" as the story continues in the present. It was difficult to keep the characters, particularly Chandler, spontaneously mad for something that happened "years ago". The comedic content was bigger than usual, because Phoebe's arm was blown off and Joey's head stuck in a turkey.

Many scenes were shot in advance. The producers disliked filming beforehand as they preferred "the audience to tell us what's good and what's bad." They also were concerned that a flashback episode would be mistaken for a clip show, but felt it would be believable because they were "flashing so far back into the past." According to Kauffman, certain scenes filmed in the apartment were shot in advance because "it was all over the place"; the cast were tired and full and their energy levels were low. Special effects and costume changes meant "three or four scenes" were also pre-shot to ensure the dialogue was happening in front of the audience. This was completed in two days.

Elliott Gould and Christina Pickles reprised their roles as Jack and Judy Geller. The set for the Geller house was used previously in "The One Where Joey Moves Out", for Jack's birthday party and in the season seven episode "The One Where Rosita Dies", when Ross and Monica visit their parent's garage. The flashback in Thanksgiving 1987 was Monica and Chandler's first meeting along with Rachel and Chandler. Bright commented that the show tries not to contradict itself; "once we establish something, we try not to undo it." In "The Pilot" it appears Rachel meets Chandler for the first time. She also meets him in a later flashback episode, "The One Where The Stripper Cries". To excuse the continuity error, Bright adds they do not remember each other meeting because they look different.

A special rubber and foam turkey was created for Joey and Monica to place on their heads for sanitary and insurance reasons. A weaving, invisible to the audience, was placed in the middle of the turkey to allow the character to see. Chandler's "flock of seagulls" hairstyle, mentioned in a previous episode, was based on the 1980s time period. For safety, the scene where Monica severed Chandler's toe was pre-shot. Originally the sound of a knife slashing through Chandler's shoe was placed, but according to Crane it "got a little too graphic". Dramatic music was dubbed over instead.

== Cultural references ==
The inspiration for Phoebe's character spurting blood was Dan Aykroyd's Julia Child sketch on Saturday Night Live. In the sketch, Aykroyd plays Julia Child who accidentally cuts her finger, causing blood to spurt everywhere. The turkey stuck on Joey's head is a reference to Act 4 in "Merry Christmas, Mr. Bean", a 1992 episode of Mr. Bean. Ross and Chandler's costumes in 1988 were inspired by Miami Vice, which was popular at the time. The music used in Chandler's accident was "The Murder" from Alfred Hitchcock's Psycho.

== Reception ==
It brought together the past of Monica being rejected by Chandler, then Chandler in a way being rejected by Monica and then coming back to their relationship in the future that we are all rooting for.

— Kevin S. Bright, The One With All The Thanksgivings, DVD commentary

In its original airing, the show finished second in ratings for the week of November 16–22, 1998, with a Nielsen rating of 16.0, equivalent to approximately 15.5 million households. It was the network's second highest-rated show that week, after ER, which aired on the same night. The episode premiered in the United Kingdom on Sky1 on February 25, 1999 and reached 1.88 million viewers which made it the most watched show that week. It aired on Channel 4 on August 27, 1999 and was watched by 4.40 million viewers making Friends the channel's third-highest rated program for the week ending August 29, 1999.

Entertainment Weekly rated the episode "B+" and called the "pre-nose job" Rachel and "Fat Monica" great sight gags. It cited Joey's line "It's not so much an underpant as it is a feat of engineering" (in reference to a thong) as the best of the episode. The authors of Friends Like Us: The Unofficial Guide to Friends wrote "This unusual episode is one of the series' best ever, with the non-stop comedy roller-coaster suddenly throwing a brilliant surprise ending at you".

Debra McGuire was nominated for a Primetime Emmy Award for Outstanding Costume Design for a Series, while the mixers were nominated for Outstanding Sound Mixing for a Comedy Series or a Special. The popularity of this episode placed it on one of the first Region 1 "best of" DVD releases. It was also released as part of Friends: The Complete Fifth Season in Regions 1, 2, and 4.

In 2004, "The One with All the Thanksgivings" was ranked fifth in a list of the top 10 Friends episodes by the Daily Herald and in 2010, was identified as one of the five best Thanksgiving-themed episodes by Contra Costa Times.

In 2021 Mr. Bean writer Richard Curtis said they had been accused of copying the turkey on the head joke from Friends, when in fact they had created the joke first in 1992 for Merry Christmas Mr. Bean and later revived it in 1997 for the film Bean. He accused the Friends writers of stealing the joke whilst Rowan Atkinson, the creator and portrayer of Bean, said that jokes are there to inspire, not to be stolen.
