= Michael Borkow =

American producer and screenwriter

- Education: Harvard University; Columbia University
- Occupations: Producer, screenwriter
- Years active: 1992–2016

Michael Borkow is an American producer and screenwriter. He was executive producer for the fourth season of the American sitcom television series Friends from 1997 to 1998.

Borkow was born to Susan, a lawyer in Hewlett Harbor, New York and Stephen Borkow, an orthopedic surgeon in Oceanside, New York and Valley Stream, New York. He attended Harvard University and Columbia University, where he earned a Juris Doctor degree. Borkow began his television career in 1992, writing for the sitcom Flying Blind. He then produced and wrote for the sitcom television series Friends.

Borkow's other television credits include Roseanne, The Bernie Mac Show, How to Be a Gentleman, Friends with Benefits, Clarissa Explains It All, Mom, Welcome to the Family and Malcolm in the Middle. In 1996 he was nominated for a Primetime Emmy Award in the category Outstanding Comedy Series for his work on the television series Friends, along with Betsy Borns, Kevin S. Bright, Adam Chase, David Crane, Alexa Junge, Marta Kauffman, Todd Stevens and Ira Ungerleider. Borkow also produced for the Friends spin-off Joey, after which he took two years out to travel and study Judaism, returning to television work in 2009.

Michael Borkow is Jewish and has expressed a strong commitment to his Jewish beliefs, emphasizing the importance of living according to the Torah and integrating his faith into his work and daily life. He actively engages in Jewish practices, such as keeping kosher and observing Shabbat, and seeks to ensure that his professional endeavors align with his values as he becomes more observant.
