= The One Where Rachel Smokes =

- Friends episode
- Rachel attempting to smoke in front of her colleagues
- Episode no.: Season 5 Episode 18
- Directed by: Todd Holland
- Written by: Michael Curtis
- Production code: 467668
- Original air date: April 8, 1999

Guest appearances
- Joanna Gleason as Kim Clozzi; Jane Sibbett as Carol; Megan Ward as Nancy; Judy Kain as The Casting Director; Jim Wise as Kyle; Jack Allen & Charlie Allen as Ben; Matt Weinberg as Raymond

Episode chronology
| ← Previous "The One with Rachel's Inadvertent Kiss" | Next → "The One Where Ross Can't Flirt" |
- Friends season 5

"The One Where Rachel Smokes" is the eighteenth episode of the fifth season of Friends and 115th overall. It first aired on NBC in the United States on April 8, 1999. In the episode, Rachel (Jennifer Aniston) starts her new job at Ralph Lauren and soon feels left out because all the decision-making takes place on smoking breaks and she does not smoke. She tries to solve the problem by taking up the habit, which proves difficult. Meanwhile, Ben auditions for a soup commercial and Joey (Matt LeBlanc) decides to come along to try for a part as well. When each is paired with a different actor, the auditions become competitive. Elsewhere, Monica (Courteney Cox) and Phoebe (Lisa Kudrow) plan a surprise party for Rachel.

The episode was directed by Todd Holland and written by Michael Curtis. Although Aniston's character Rachel was not a smoker, Aniston herself was at the time, and often said she planned to quit. In its original broadcast, "The One Where Rachel Smokes" acquired a Nielsen rating of 14.8, finishing the week ranked third.

== Plot ==
Ross (David Schwimmer) and Carol (Jane Sibbett) inform the others that their son Ben (Jack and Charlie Allen) has an audition for a soup commercial, which Joey (Matt LeBlanc) finds hard to accept. When he learns that the TV commercial also has a part for the father, he volunteers himself for the audition. Both Joey and Ben are chosen for the callback, but a lack of similarity in looks among the remaining actors makes the director cast them with different individuals, therefore ensuring only one of them can be chosen for the commercial. Joey attempts to convince Ross to pull Ben from the audition, which offends Ross and causes the two to fight. At the callback, Joey repeatedly flubs his single short line, ultimately losing him the part. Ross consoles Joey and hypothesizes that Joey subconsciously sabotaged his own audition to help Ben. Ross then admits that Ben also did not get the part.

On her first day working at Ralph Lauren, Rachel (Jennifer Aniston) tries to get along with her new colleague and boss, Nancy and Kim. The latter two are smokers and go on a cigarette break without Rachel; when they return, Rachel is angered to discover that they are making company decisions without her while smoking. Rachel fears that Nancy is more likely to be promoted as a result, and so Rachel smokes with them on their next break, but attempts to convince them to quit, unsuccessfully. At a later break, Kim, who thinks Rachel is herself trying to quit smoking, warns Rachel that she may fire her if she catches Rachel with another cigarette, as Kim does not want to "drag her down with them". As Rachel leaves, Kim invites Nancy to go on a business trip to Paris with her.

Phoebe (Lisa Kudrow) and Monica (Courteney Cox) organize a surprise party for Rachel one month ahead of her birthday, but Monica's insistence on planning everything herself leaves Phoebe with only cup and ice duties. Phoebe spitefully gets back at Monica at the party by creatively decorating the apartment with cups and serving snow cones, leaving all of Monica's food ignored. Rachel arrives home and is very surprised to find the party, given that Chandler's (Matthew Perry) birthday is before hers.

Over the credits, Chandler arrives at Ralph Lauren to take Rachel to lunch, meeting Nancy and Kim on their smoke break. Chandler, beguiled by all the smoke, quickly puffs at Kim's cigarette before leaving.

== Production ==
"The One Where Rachel Smokes" was written by Michael Curtis, making it his third writing credit of the season. It was the only episode directed by Todd Holland. Holland worked previously as a director on Tales from the Crypt, Felicity and most notably The Larry Sanders Show, where he won a Primetime Emmy Award for Outstanding Directing for a Comedy Series at the 50th Primetime Emmy Awards. Despite her character's refusal to smoke, Jennifer Aniston at the time of filming was a frequent smoker. She publicly asserted her intention to quit in the past and even turned to hypnosis, with the help from co-star Lisa Kudrow. Joanna Gleason made her first appearance as Rachel's boss Kim Clozzi. She would later appear in the sixth-season episode "The One With Ross's Teeth". "The One Where Rachel Smokes" marked the final appearance of Charlie and Jack Allen as Ben Geller-Willick-Bunch, who were replaced with Cole Sprouse.

== Cultural references ==
The songs "Never There" by Cake and "Jamming" by Bob Marley can be heard playing at Rachel's birthday party. At Ben's audition, a copy of Variety magazine is seen being read by a child, whom Carol recognises.

== Reception ==
In its original airing, "The One Where Rachel Smokes" finished third in ratings for the week of April 5 – 11, 1999, with a Nielsen rating of 14.8, equivalent to approximately 14.4 million viewing households. It was the third highest-rated show on NBC that week, after ER and Frasier. The episode premiered in the United Kingdom on Sky1 on May 6, 1999, and attained 1.76 million viewers, making it the most watched program on the network that week.

Entertainment Weekly rated the episode "C", in its review of the fifth season. It cited Chandler's line "You've got to push past this, okay? Because it's about to get sooo good" as the best of the episode. The review criticized the manner in which an employee can feel pressured into smoking, adding it is "not exactly the stuff that laughs are made of". Moreover, it argued the same over the competitive vibe between Joey and Ross. Colin Jacobson at DVD Movie Guide added in a review of the fifth season DVD: "Although I don't like the cutesy kid who plays Ben, the audition bits become funny due to Joey’s screw-ups. His inability to correctly read the line "mmm – soup!" becomes very amusing and offers the show's highlights."

The episode was released as part of Friends: The Complete Fifth Season in Regions 1, 2 and 4. There are two extra scenes included in the DVD: one with Carol at the audition and Chandler at the party attempting to sneak a cigarette.
