= The One with the Cop =

- Friends episode
- Episode no.: Season 5 Episode 16
- Directed by: Andrew Tsao
- Written by: Story by: Alicia Sky Varinaitis; Teleplay by: Gigi McCreery & Perry Rein
- Production code: 467666
- Original air date: February 25, 1999

Guest appearance
- Michael Rapaport as Gary

Episode chronology
← Previous "The One with the Girl Who Hits Joey"	Next → "The One with Rachel's Inadvertent Kiss"
- Friends season 5

"The One with the Cop" is the sixteenth episode of the fifth season of Friends and the 113th overall. It first aired on the NBC network in the United States on February 25, 1999.

== Plot ==
Chandler and Monica cuddle while cooperating on a crossword puzzle, which Joey finds cute. That night, however, he dreams that he was doing the crossword puzzle with Monica, leading him to wonder if he finds her attractive. This is exacerbated when, at Central Perk the next morning, Monica is found wearing his sweatshirt as opposed to Chandler's, and later when Monica asks him to taste her cooking, leading to him confessing about his dreams. A bit of honest discussion between the three of them reveals that Joey is not really attracted to Monica, but rather to the intimacy and friendship she shares with Chandler. The two explain that this is because they were friends first before they started dating. Equipped with this new philosophy, Joey first tries to get on Rachel's good side, on the grounds that they are already friends, but she advises him to strike up a friendship with a woman and then pursue a relationship. Joey tries to do this, but when meeting a woman to strike up a friendship, he ends up in a threesome with her and her roommate.

While digging beneath a Central Perk chair cushion for spare change, Phoebe uncovers a policeman's badge. Though she promises to return it, she entertains herself by exploiting her newfound power to force a smoking bystander to apologize to a tree on which she stubbed out a cigarette. When she begins threatening her friends with arrest, she realizes she has gone too far, but before she can return it, she tries to force a man, Gary, to move his illegally-parked car. When Gary turns out to be a policeman as well, Phoebe claims to be an undercover cop. Gary later arrives at Monica's apartment and reveals that the badge is his, but instead of arresting Phoebe, he asks her out on a date.

Rachel is helping Ross shop for a new couch. After he finds one he likes, he forgoes delivery charges by having her help him carry it the three blocks to his apartment. Getting it up a narrow stairwell proves more problematic; Rachel conscripts Chandler to help, and the three attempt to manhandle the couch up the stairs, only to get it stuck between landings. The couch ends up cut in half after Rachel accidentally pulls the fire alarm and Ross’ neighbors have to walk over the couch. Ross then attempts to return it and receives store credit in the amount of four dollars.

== Pivot scene ==
A scene in the episode where Ross, while moving his new sofa up the stairs, repeatedly screams "Pivot!" at Rachel and Chandler was called iconic by the magazine House Beautiful. It became a meme on the internet.

The Irish website Joe wrote that the mathematician Caroline Zunckel explained how the friends got the sofa upstairs, saying: "By applying Pythagoras' theorem to the estimated measurements of Ross's sofa in a vertical position and dimensions of the stairs, I was able to establish that it would have been possible to get the item upstairs. It's quite simple really!". A related mathematical problem is called the moving sofa problem.

HuffPost wrote that it was one of the "14 Best Episodes of Friends to Binge Watch Right Now".
