= 52nd Writers Guild of America Awards =

52nd WGA Awards
- Date: March 5, 2000
- Organized by: Writers Guild of America, East and the Writers Guild of America, West

The 52nd Writers Guild of America Awards, given in 2000, honored the film and television best writers of 1999.

== Film ==
=== Best Adapted Screenplay ===
Election - Alexander Payne and Jim Taylor

- The Cider House Rules - John Irving †
- The Insider - Michael Mann and Eric Roth
- October Sky - Lewis Colick
- The Talented Mr. Ripley - Anthony Minghella

=== Best Original Screenplay ===
American Beauty - Alan Ball †

- Being John Malkovich - Charlie Kaufman
- Magnolia - Paul Thomas Anderson
- The Sixth Sense - M. Night Shyamalan
- Three Kings - John Ridley and David O. Russell

== Television ==
=== Best Episodic Comedy ===
Merry Christmas, Mrs. Moskowitz - Frasier - Jay Kogen

- The Paper Hat Anniversary - Dharma & Greg - Bill Prady, Eric Zicklin and Chuck Lorre
- The One Where Everybody Finds Out - Friends - Alexa Junge
- Four Women and A Hobo - Sex and The City - Jenny Bicks
- Evolution - Sex and The City - Cindy Chupack

=== Best Episodic Drama ===
Meadowlands - The Sopranos - Jason Cahill

- The Storm, Part 1 - ER - John Wells
- DWB - Law & Order - René Balcer
- U.S. Male - Oz - Tom Fontana and Bradford Winters

=== Original Long Form ===
Dash and Lily - Jerrold L. Ludwig

- Freak City - Jane Shepard
- Aldrich Ames: Traitor Within - Michael Burton
- Purgatory - Gordon T. Dawson
