= Seeing Allred =

2018 documentary film

- Poster
- Directed by: Roberta Grossman; Sophie Sartain
- Produced by: Hannah K.S. Canter; Roberta Grossman; Marta Kauffman; Sophie Sartain; Robbie Tollin
- Starring: Gloria Allred; Lisa Bloom; Bill Cosby
- Cinematography: Alex Pollini
- Edited by: Chris Callister
- Music by: H. Scott Salinas
- Distributed by: Netflix
- Release dates: January 21, 2018 (Sundance Film Festival); February 9, 2018 (Netflix)
- Running time: 96 minutes
- Country: United States
- Language: English

Seeing Allred is a 2018 documentary film directed by Roberta Grossman and Sophie Sartain, following women's rights attorney Gloria Allred as she takes on cases of sexual assault allegations concerning some of the most famous people in politics and business. The film was released by Netflix on February 9, 2018.

== Premise ==
Seeing Allred provides a biographical portrait of one of the most public women's rights attorneys, Gloria Allred, through archival footage and interviews with both her supporters and critics.

== Cast ==
- Gloria Allred
- Lisa Bloom
- Bill Cosby
- Roy Moore
- Gloria Steinem
