= Joey Tribbiani =

Fictional character from the American sitcoms Friends and Joey

- Friends/Joey character
- Matt LeBlanc as Joey Tribbiani
- First appearance: "The Pilot"; Friends; September 22, 1994
- Last appearance: "Joey and the Wedding"; Joey; August 23, 2006
- Created by: David Crane; Marta Kauffman; Kevin S. Bright
- Portrayed by: Matt LeBlanc

In-universe information
- Full name: Joseph Francis Tribbiani Jr.
- Aliases: Ken Adams; Holden McGroin; Joseph Stalin; Chandler Bing
- Nicknames: Joe; Big Daddy; Chick; Dragon; Big Guy; Chandler (by Gunther); J-Man, J-Bird (by himself in Joey); Lenny (by Chandler); Kickie (by Chandler); Mario; Kevin; Jojo (by Jimmy); Flameboy (by Phoebe); Baby (by Rachel); Dr. Drake Ramoray (name in Days of Our Lives); Drake (by Erika); Twinkle-toes (by Rachel); VD Boy (by Ross); Cookie (by his mom)
- Occupation: Actor; Cologne sampler (seasons 1–2); Entry-level processor (season 2); Acting teacher (season 3); Christmas tree salesman (season 3); Museum tour guide (season 4); Waiter (season 4); Barista (season 6)
- Affiliation: Screen Actors Guild (SAG)
- Family: Joseph Tribbiani Sr. (father); Gloria Tribbiani (mother); Gina Tribbiani (sister); Dina Tribbiani (sister); Mary Angela Tribbiani (sister); Mary Therese Tribbiani (sister); Veronica Tribbiani (sister); Cookie Tribbiani (sister); Tina Tribbiani (sister)
- Significant others: Angela Delvecchio (ex-girlfriend); Kate (ex-girlfriend); Kathy (ex-girlfriend); Janine (ex-girlfriend); Erin (ex-girlfriend); Rachel Green (ex-girlfriend); Alex Garrett (girlfriend)
- Relatives: Michael Tribbiani (nephew); Nonna (grandmother); Nonnie (grandmother); Jimmy Costa (brother-in-law)
- Religion: Catholicism
- Nationality: Italian-American
- Birth date: January 9, 1968

Joseph Francis Tribbiani Jr. is a fictional character, serving as one of the primary characters of the NBC sitcom Friends and the protagonist of its spin-off Joey. He is portrayed by Matt LeBlanc in both series.

Joey is an Italian-American struggling actor who lives in New York City with his roommate and best friend, Chandler Bing (Matthew Perry), and hangs out in a tight-knit group of his best friends: Chandler, Ross Geller (David Schwimmer), Monica Geller (Courteney Cox), Rachel Green (Jennifer Aniston), and Phoebe Buffay (Lisa Kudrow). He lived with a few other roommates when Chandler moved out to move in with Monica.

Joey once mentioned being 13 in 1981. He is from Queens, New York and is Catholic. Joey comes from a working-class Italian-American family of eight children, of which he is the only boy. His father Joseph Tribbiani Sr. (Robert Costanzo), is a pipefitter, and his mother's name is Gloria (Brenda Vaccaro). Joey has seven sisters: Mary Therese (Mimi Lieber on Friends) a.k.a. Mary Teresa (Christina Ricci on Joey), Mary Angela (Holly Gagnier), Dina (Lisa Melilli in The One Where Chandler Can't Remember Which Sister, Marla Sokoloff in The One with Monica's Boots), Gina (K.J. Steinberg on Friends, Drea de Matteo on Joey), Tina (Lisa Maris), Veronica (Dena Miceli), and Cookie (Alex Meneses). As a child, he was extremely accident-prone. In "The One with Ross' New Girlfriend", it was implied that he was sexually abused by his tailor but did not realize it until Chandler went to the same tailor.

Joey is portrayed as promiscuous and dim-witted but good-natured, as well as very loyal, caring, and protective of his friends. The writers of Friends did not intend his character to be stupid, but Matt LeBlanc played "dim-witted" so well that it became a part of the character. He is a food-loving womanizer who has had more luck with dates than any of the other group members. In contrast to his persona as the "ladies' man", he has also a marked childish side. He enjoys playing video games and foosball, loves sandwiches and pizza, and is a big fan of Baywatch and Beavis and Butt-Head. As a struggling actor, he is constantly looking for work. He was ordained as a minister in "The One with the Truth About London" and officiated at Monica and Chandler's wedding. And also, Phoebe and Mike's wedding in Season 10.

He does not like sharing food, especially when it is pizza, and has difficulty with even simple mathematics. In sports, Joey likes the New York Yankees in baseball, New York Knicks in basketball, New York Giants in football, and the New York Rangers in hockey.

== Appearances ==
Joey Tribbiani is a member of the Screen Actors Guild, having refused to follow in his father's foot steps and become a pipefitter. He started his acting profession doing stage work, introduced in the show's pilot episode by Monica and Chandler having seen Joey in a production of Pinocchio. Sometime before the start of the series, Joey also had appeared in a porn film, as a fully clothed extra. Joey also mentioned appearing in a play with trolls before getting the leading role of Sigmund Freud in the musical play Freud!, where he was first spotted by his talent agent Estelle Leonard. She immediately got him a film role in the same episode as Al Pacino's "butt double" – a speechless role he later lost due to taking the part too seriously. By then, he said, he had been doing "nothing but crappy plays for six years". Monica and Chandler also once discussed having seen Joey in a version of Macbeth, in which he was unable to pronounce most of the words.

== Season 1 ==
Joey becomes an "actor-slash-model" when he appears on print ads for the NYC Free Clinic, as a man named "Mario" who has a venereal disease. He also did an infomercial for a device that allows milk to be poured out of milk cartons; he played "Kevin", a man who had extreme difficulty opening the cartons without the use of the device. ("Kevin" also inadvertently choked on a cookie during the show). This haunted him again when he appeared in the play The King, where he was made fun of due to choking on a cookie.

== Season 2 ==
In Season Two, Joey continued his stage work, appearing as "The King" in a poorly reviewed (and never-named) play. Published reviews of his performance claimed he was "disturbingly unskilled" and that he achieved "brilliant new levels of sucking" in a "mediocre play" with "mindless, adolescent direction". Only days after these reviews came out, Joey gets his big break when he lands his first major role as Dr. Drake Ramoray on the soap opera Days of Our Lives, a real-life television show outside of the context of Friends which featured Jennifer Aniston's father John. In-universe, Joey had initially gone in to read for a one-shot role as a cab driver; it is implied that he got the recurring role of Ramoray by sleeping with the casting director. While still playing Ramoray, he also appears in a bit role as a dead man in the film Outbreak 2: The Virus Takes Manhattan, starring Jean-Claude Van Damme. (Originally his character was only dying in the scene but due to Joey overacting, it was changed to him being already dead.)

Several episodes later, Joey costs himself the Days of Our Lives gig when during an interview with Soap Opera Digest, he radically overstates and claims he writes most of his own lines. This angers the show's writers, who out of spite, "kill off" his character by having Dr. Ramoray fall down an elevator shaft. Joey takes this hard and admits that his role on Days was the best thing that ever happened to him.

== Season 3 ==
He goes back to stage acting in season 3 appearing in a play called Boxing Day opposite love interest Kate Miller. The play seems to start out as a conventional drama but ends with Joey's character "Victor" being taken from his apartment by aliens. In Season Four, he lands a small one-scene movie role as a cop, playing his scene opposite Charlton Heston.

Some of Joey's other jobs have included selling Christmas trees, dressing as Santa Claus and as a Christmas elf, working as a tour guide at the Museum of Natural History where Ross worked, offering perfume samples to customers at a department store, and as a Roman warrior at Caesars Palace in Las Vegas.

Joey is also briefly employed at Central Perk as a waiter. Facing a dry spell in his career as an actor, Joey is persuaded by Gunther, the manager, to take a job serving coffee. At first, Joey tries to hide his new job from his friends, but they eventually figure it out. He does not like the work but, true to his nature, soon finds a way to use his position to meet and ingratiate himself to attractive women by giving them free food, although Gunther quickly puts a stop to it. Joey does not take his job seriously, and spends a lot of his working hours sitting and talking to his friends. Eventually, he is fired for closing the coffeehouse in the middle of the day to go to an audition while Gunther was running a personal errand. Rachel later persuades Gunther to give Joey back his job, but once Joey finds more steady acting jobs he eventually just stops showing up. His absence is barely noticed. In a later episode, Joey realizes he forgot to tell Gunther he quit; Gunther replies that he would have eventually fired him anyway.

== Season 5 ==
Joey has some bad luck in terms of his acting career. In Season Five, he is cast in the independent film Shutter Speed, but it is shut down before filming began in Las Vegas. He is also fired from a Burger King commercial. He films a role in a Law & Order episode that was cut from the completed episode—Joey is only "seen" as a corpse in a body bag.

== Seasons 6 and 7 ==
In seasons 6 and 7, he lands a starring role as Detective "Mac" Machiavelli in a short-lived and bad cop show called Mac and C.H.E.E.S.E., which Chandler described as "one of the worst things ever... and not just on TV." Joey has high hopes for the series; however, Mac and C.H.E.E.S.E. is canceled halfway through its first season.

In Season 7, Joey auditions for the role of Dr. Striker Ramoray, a new character on "Days of Our Lives" and Drake Ramoray's brother, but he does not get the role. Eventually, Joey's luck turns when he gets back his role as Dr. Drake Ramoray and is even nominated for an award for Best Returning Character, first as a character in a coma, then revived through a brain transplant with another character, Jessica Lockhart (played by Susan Sarandon).

In Season 7, he later replaces Lockhart as Dr. Drake "Jessica" Ramoray. Later, in the spin-off Joey, it turns out that he loses his role as Dr. Drake Ramoray and has to again hunt for a new job.

Later in season 7, Joey lands a supporting role as "Tony", a soldier, in a major film opposite an Oscar-nominated actor named Richard Crosby (Gary Oldman). The film is a World War I period film entitled Over There. Later Chandler accompanies Joey to the premiere of the film.

== Appearance in other seasons ==
Joey is also briefly a sperm donor for a medical experiment; at the end, the hospital would pay any donor $700. This is later mentioned when Monica goes to a sperm bank. Joey finds to his dismay that his sperm is not popular.

He also works at the restaurant "Alessandro's" where Monica is head chef, nicknaming himself "Dragon" while on the job. Monica hires him just so she can fire him to intimidate the other employees who pay her no respect, but he makes a lot of tips and backs out of the deal, only to realize how important his getting fired was to Monica. He then sets himself up to be fired the next day.

He spends one episode working with Chandler as an entry-level data processor. He treats the job like another acting role, in which he is "Joseph the Processing Guy" and creates a complex back-story for the character. Chandler begins to dislike the Joseph character when he starts showing up Chandler at work. Joey eventually leaves after Chandler pretends to be sleeping with Joey's "pretend wife".

Prior to Monica and Chandler's wedding, when the two admit that they were having trouble finding someone to perform the ceremony, Joey volunteers for the role, subsequently getting himself ordained over the Internet to entitle him to perform the marriage. He has apparently retained this role until Season Ten when he performed the ceremony for Phoebe's wedding.

Joey is characterized as a simple-minded but good-natured womanizer who loves food. He particularly loves meatball sub sandwiches. When asked if he would give up sex or food, he has trouble deciding and keeps blurting out sex or food, eventually yelling "I want girls on bread!". In "The One with the Ride Along", he appears to be saving Ross from a putative gunshot, when it was actually his meatball sandwich that he was trying to save; it just happened to be next to Ross. He also loves the "Joey Special" – two pizzas. His greed when it comes to food is also shown in the episode "The One with the Birth Mother" where he refuses to call Sarah the next day. When Phoebe asks why, Joey explains how Sarah broke his golden commandment on their date – not to share food. Phoebe is shocked, to say the least, but Rachel admits to her how this is who Joey is. Nonetheless, Phoebe makes Joey go out with Sarah again, making him order extra fries should the need arise. Joey does so, but Sarah really wants to dig in his seafood platter, making him drop his plate to the floor in the process. He exclaims, "Joey doesn't share food", which she seems to understand. However, things change course when Joey wants to nibble at her chocolate torte. As he wouldn't share his food with her, she reciprocates and warns him not to touch any of her desserts while she wanders off to take a call. When she arrives, her dessert is pretty much gone; Joey, with chocolate torte all over his face, is at peace with himself, and admits that he's "not even sorry!". In "The One with the Cheap Wedding Dress," Ross implies that Joey eats a date's food without her permission regularly.

Joey is something of an Idiot Savant in general, but capable of good ideas when the situation arises. This is alluded to in the episode "The One Where Ross Dates a Student", when Chandler, referring to Joey, says "A hot girl's at stake and suddenly he's Rain Man" when Joey suggests Ross work out who among his students called him the 'hottie of the paleontology department' by comparing the handwriting of the note to the handwriting in the class essays. In another example, Joey makes up an anecdote referred to as the "Europe story" or the "magic story"; apparently, anyone who hears it will immediately want to have sex with the teller. This is proven to be effective when Rachel successfully uses the story on Ross.

Being a glutton when it comes to food, Joey is shown throughout the series to have the uncanny ability to eat enormous quantities of food. As he prides the Tribbiani family for their eating prowess ("We might not be [...] world leaders, but damn it, we can eat!"), he takes on Monica's challenge to eat a whole roast turkey virtually all by himself. In season 8, episode 9, Monica is unwilling to cook a whole roast turkey for Thanksgiving dinner as Rachel is pregnant, Chandler refuses to eat Thanksgiving food due to childhood traumas, Phoebe is a vegetarian, and dinner guest Will (played by Brad Pitt) is on a diet. Joey's love for Thanksgiving traditions, however, convinces Monica to roast the turkey only under the condition that Joey can eat the entire 19-pound bird in one sitting. When Monica sees him struggle, she says she is only kidding, but Joey perseveres and with a little help from Phoebe's maternity pants, he eventually not only consumes the entire turkey but has room for dessert afterward. A similar eating stunt happens in season 9, episode 5 when Joey is left alone at the dinner table in a restaurant after Phoebe's failed birthday dinner, and he is forced to eat six meals by himself. He finishes them, only to tuck them into the birthday cake afterward.

Joey is extremely promiscuous, often relying on his catchphrase pickup line "How you doin'?". He regularly sleeps with attractive women, but can never seem to get into a committed relationship – judging from a conversation he has with Chandler at the latter's bachelor party he seems to regard marriage as depressing and restrictive. He sleeps with many of the interns and extras on shows on which he works. He has apparently been sexually active for a long time; he undid a 16-year-old girl's bra when he was nine, slept with his teacher in the seventh grade, and had a "wild spring break" when he was 13. In the episode "The One with Joey's Interview", he sleeps with the interviewer (played by Sasha Alexander) so what he said about not watching soap operas doesn't get published in Soap Opera Digest.

Despite his promiscuous nature towards many women throughout the series, he is highly protective and old-fashioned when it comes to the relationships of his own sisters. While he does not seem to have a problem with his own lifestyle, he repeatedly makes sure his sisters don't go down the same path. When he finds out in season 3, episode 11 that Chandler drunkenly made out with his sister Mary Angela, he attempts to force the two into a relationship. Later, in season 8, episode 10, Joey initially attempts to force his younger sister Dina into marriage with her hapless boyfriend upon hearing she's pregnant, but they play into his emotional nature by saying they want to raise the baby independently.

While he is not very bright, Joey is a caring and kindhearted person. He lets Rachel live with him when she is fighting with Ross, financially supports Monica and Chandler, and helps Phoebe find work when she is unemployed. He is willing to marry Phoebe and Rachel on separate occasions he finds out that each is pregnant. Joey is also the most physically powerful of the group, being able to easily push Ross over a couch with only one hand, and offering to go to the coffee house to intimidate two bullies into leaving Ross and Chandler alone.

He is a Stephen King fan, having read The Shining several times, as well as being a fan of the film adaptation of one of King's novels, Cujo. He also becomes a fan of the classic novel, Little Women after Rachel asks him to read it to see if it was better than The Shining. Joey briefly mentions to the gang that Al Pacino is his idol. Joey has the poster for the 1983 Al Pacino film Scarface in his bedroom and the same poster is seen in his house in Joey. Joey, Ross and Chandler are huge fans of Die Hard.

He moves apartments four times in the series. The first time, he moves to his own lavish apartment away from Chandler (with whom the psychotic Eddie moved in) after he gets the role as Dr. Drake Ramoray on Days of Our Lives, though he moves back soon afterward due to his loss of the role. The other times are when he and Chandler move into what is usually Monica's apartment, after winning it from her in a game in "The One with the Embryos". They are later forced back to their own apartment by the girls.

Although Joey dates several women in the series, very few of these relationships are serious, and his romantic partners rarely appear for more than one episode. However, despite his great interest in women, Joey has made it clear more than once that his friends are more important to him; when his latest relationship, Janine (Elle Macpherson), stated that she dislikes Monica and Chandler, Joey breaks it off with her despite the fact that he had been trying to win her over for the previous four episodes. He tells Janine that Monica and Chandler are like family, and he can't be with her if she doesn't like them.

Joey was originally dismissed by Chandler when he came in for a roommate interview (in favor of Eric, a fashion photographer, who apologetically informs Chandler that, due to his work, models will have to come to the apartment, and that his sister - a porn actress - has a beach house Chandler is welcome to use), and Joey thought Chandler was gay. However, when Eric comes back into the building to move in, he is confronted by Mr. Heckles, a senile building resident who claims to be Chandler's new roommate, causing Eric to leave and Chandler to go with his second choice, Joey (In "The One with the Flashback" set in 1993, Joey moved in three years before, although in "The One with All the Thanksgivings" it shows that the gang knew Joey was Chandler's roommate in 1992 and he would have been his roommate for quite some time). Joey's first couple of days involve a brief, mutual attraction to Monica. This subsides and Chandler and Joey quickly become best friends as Joey's carefree lifestyle grows on Chandler.

Later in the series, they buy a chick and a duck together, whom Chandler has named Yasmine and Dick, respectively. A long-running gag depicts Joey and Chandler occasionally fighting with each other like an old married couple. Joey moves out temporarily when he finds success playing Dr. Drake Ramoray on a soap opera, but soon moves back in after his character was dropped down an elevator shaft. At the end of the series, Chandler and Monica make it clear to Joey that their new house outside the city will have a room for him.

While Joey is best friends with Chandler, Ross is a close second (although Ross has been referred to as his best friend several times). At a time when Joey and Chandler have problems after Chandler kisses Joey's girlfriend, Joey stops acting as Chandler's best friend and replaces him with Ross, although this only lasts until Chandler spends Thanksgiving in a box in order to show his remorse and apologize to him. Joey and Chandler have remained best friends ever since.

Furthermore, Joey and Ross share a moment in an episode after watching Die Hard all night. They fall asleep on Ross' couch, which is evidently enjoyed by Joey, as he tries to coerce Ross into more nap sessions with him. Also, earlier in the series, after much persuading by Joey, Ross gives in and kisses him to help him practice kissing men. In response, Joey replies that the audition was already over, he had not gotten the part, but the kiss was very well received, and "Rachel is one lucky girl".

== Relationships ==
The major development of their relationship was when Joey fell in love with Rachel, Ross's ex-girlfriend, and Ross's love interest since the ninth grade. When Joey goes on to tell Ross about it, he cannot say it in his face and instead says that he loves his "friend's" ex-girlfriend. When asked if that "friend" (Ross) is a good guy, Joey honestly answers "Yeah...He's the best." Initially, it causes a major rift, with Joey being apologetic, but when Ross sees Joey truly in love with Rachel, he gives him the go-ahead. Ross basically says that he is not okay with it but he wants to be, and the two's friendship deepens due to Joey's refusal to date Rachel unless Ross okays the deal. However, Joey and Rachel do not date long, and later, Joey encourages Ross to pursue Rachel in the season finale.

Joey and Monica are close friends often joking around with each other. Joey allowed Monica to hire and fire him to prove to her employees that she was not a pushover. When he discovered that Monica and Chandler had developed a romantic relationship, he agreed to keep it secret until the two were ready to reveal it to the rest of their group. In an episode where he sees how close Chandler and Monica are, he dreams of himself and Monica in the same way. This later causes him to act weird around Monica. Finally, he reveals this to Chandler and Monica, it is that he wants a relationship like that, but Monica finds it nice thinking Joey thought of the two of them together. He also called Chandler moments after suspecting Monica of having an affair with a mystery male he had heard in her apartment. When Monica and Chandler needed their Engagement Picture taken, Chandler could not smile. In the newspaper announcement, it showed the photo was of Monica and Joey.

Joey always enjoyed a close relationship with Monica, Rachel, and Phoebe; LeBlanc once speculated that Joey saw the girls as sisters more than potential romantic interests. However, the tension between Monica and Joey is at times fairly obvious, and it is made clear that the two have a very close, almost intimate, relationship, though it is never consummated on the show. According to the DVD commentary of the pilot episode, Joey and Monica were initially meant to be the principal love connection of the show but were overshadowed by the Ross-Rachel relationship. In Episode 1.07 "The One with the Blackout," Phoebe blurted to Joey that Monica had a crush on him when he was moving in with Chandler. In the Season 3 episode "The One with the Flashback", an instant attraction appears to form between Joey and Monica when they first meet (to the point that Monica silently thanks Chandler for choosing him as a roommate), but after Monica invites Joey inside her apartment for some juice and Joey misinterprets it as Monica wanting sex and subsequently undressing in front of her, she is put off and they instead remain friends. This idea was revisited in Season 7 when it is revealed that Monica initially meant to hit on Joey in London, and not Chandler. She states that it was because she was looking for something meaningless, never expecting to have found Chandler and fall in love with him. The concept of what their marriage would have been like was then envisioned by Phoebe and it consisted of Monica cooking constantly for an obese Joey.

Phoebe is Joey's female best friend. They appear to understand each other. They are the only members of the group who lack a college education. Joey is Phoebe's best male friend; in The One with All the Cheesecakes, it is shown that they have dinner together once a month to talk about the rest of the group and Joey once tried to get Phoebe to call him 'Big Daddy' in that same episode. Both characters show a softness for each other, even when joking or when they are upset with the others. In "The One with the Race Car Bed", it is implied that Phoebe can hear Joey's thoughts. In "The One with the Ride Along", she explains that "when the revolution comes, I will have to destroy you all... not you, Joey". In the episode "The One in Vegas", after Joey has said that no one will live in his hand-shaped mansion, he adds "Except you, Pheebs...you can live in the thumb." When she was a surrogate mother for her brother's triplets and suddenly craved meat, Joey offered to eat no meat until the babies were born, to compensate for her consumption and, in a way, preserve her vegetarianism (no extra animals would have to be killed). When Phoebe was upset because she'd turned thirty-one without having had the perfect kiss, Joey kissed her so that she could cross that off her list (also adding that he was one-sixteenth Portuguese when she mentioned that she hadn't met any Portuguese people). Joey did not have romantic feelings for Phoebe. Joey dates briefly Phoebe's twin sister Ursula, which upsets Phoebe; he breaks it off to preserve his friendship with Phoebe, however. When Monica finds out that Joey "sees a friend in a different way", she assumes it to be Phoebe. Phoebe, overwhelmed by the news, approaches Joey, only to find that it is Rachel. Phoebe also has Joey locked in as a backup for her marriage.

When the Friends believe that the group may have to split up, Phoebe and Rachel conspire to form a separate group by themselves, but Phoebe insists that Joey be invited to their new group as well. Phoebe's loyalty is proved again when she states that she could live in Las Vegas, since it has everything she needs, "Including Joey!". He, in turn, invites her to live with him in the mansion he expected to own when he becomes rich from having a hand twin.

When Joey learned from a customer at Central Perk that Phoebe was apparently a porn star, he refused to watch the movies even when the other four decided to do so. However, he shows a new interest in them when he learned that the film actually stars Ursula.

When Joey believes Phoebe to be pregnant, he proposes, claiming the world is too scary for a single mother. This proposal is apparently made entirely without romantic intentions. Phoebe says yes and accepts his ring, but Monica tells Joey that it is Rachel who is pregnant, so Joey proposes to Rachel and must retrieve the ring from a reluctant Phoebe.

Phoebe also sets up Joey with many of her friends. On a double date, Joey sets her up with a stranger, Mike (Paul Rudd), whom she eventually marries.

In one episode, after persuasion from Rachel, he reads Little Women and she reads The Shining. She finds out that whenever he gets scared whilst reading he puts the book in the freezer. At the end of the episode, Joey is afraid that one of the characters is going to die and Rachel says, "Do you want to put it in the freezer?" Their close friendship continues and when a fire destroys Rachel and Phoebe's apartment, Rachel moves in with Joey and stays there, even after her apartment has been repaired.

Halfway through season 8, Joey and Rachel go out on a date so that Rachel can have one night of fun before it becomes too obvious that she's pregnant. They have a great time, and afterward, Joey starts developing feelings for Rachel. He does not act on his feelings out of loyalty to Ross. However, upon discovering Joey's feelings for Rachel, Ross encourages his friend to talk to her. Joey tells Rachel about his feelings, but she does not return them, and things are awkward between them for a while, but they quickly reconcile.

Towards the end of season 9, Rachel starts developing feelings for Joey, but fears he does not feel the same way anymore and has already moved on, especially when he starts dating Ross' colleague Charlie Wheeler (Aisha Tyler). When the gang goes to Barbados for a convention from Ross' work, Joey finds out about Rachel's feelings, and even though he first says nothing can happen, he changes his mind when he sees Charlie and Ross kiss, and he goes back to Rachel's room to be with her. They continue their relationship for several episodes and gain Ross' approval after he realizes that it has been six years since his relationship with Rachel ended, and he should move on from that. When Rachel and Joey prepare for their first night together, however, they realize they are too close as friends to make their relationship work, with Rachel instinctively slapping Joey away when he tries to touch her as she suddenly finds herself unable to get past the fact that it's Joey touching her. After Chandler mentions how natural it was for him and Monica to make the transition from friends to lovers, Joey and Rachel realize they are not on the same path and go back to being friends. At the end, when Chandler and Monica announce that they are moving into a house, Joey presents them with a housewarming gift of a chick and a duck, that are named Chick Jr. and Duck Jr. The pets remain in Joey's apartment but were presumably given away to a shelter when Joey moved to LA.

Soon after Chandler and Monica move out, Joey moves to LA to focus on his acting career. That was the last time the six best friends are portrayed hanging out together.

== Joey ==
After the final season of Friends, he becomes the main character of Joey, a spin-off/sequel series, where he moves to L.A. to further his acting career. His sister Gina Tribbiani (Drea de Matteo) and his nephew Michael (Paulo Costanzo) are two other central characters in the show.

Joey turns down a role in a sitcom called Nurses to star in a different series pilot. His pilot does not get picked up, while Nurses becomes a huge hit. However, his acting career has had some better moments. In Joey, it is revealed that Joey's character of Dr. Drake Ramoray dies again on Days of Our Lives where he is stabbed by a nurse ("Joey and the Wrong Name"). He wins a Daytime Soap Award for "Best Death Scene". In later Joey episodes, Joey lands a starring role on the prime time soap Deep Powder. When he gets fired from that job, he bounces back by snagging a leading role in the big-budget action film Captured. He also becomes close friends with fellow actor Zach Miller (Miguel A. Núñez Jr.), and at the premiere of Captured, he repairs his strained relationship with his father.

Throughout the series, Joey develops a complicated on-off relationship with Alex Garrett (Andrea Anders), his next-door neighbor and property manager. They become good friends upon meeting and Alex confides her problems with her marriage in Joey. At the end of season one, she and Joey become romantically involved during her separation from her husband. In season two she becomes romantically interested in Joey and has a crush on him for a long period. Gina tries to help her to get over Joey, but once Alex starts dating Joey's friend Dean, Joey soon realizes that he is also in love with Alex, and they slowly form a committed relationship. In the series finale, Joey becomes concerned over believing that Alex is planning for marriage too early in their relationship, only to become upset when she says she does not want to marry again. When the two argue about the situation, Alex compares his attitude to him not wanting a piece of broccoli until the second she denies it from him. This argument culminates in them nearly marrying out of spite until they make up when he admits to her that she is the first girl he has ever wanted to marry. At the end of the episode, Alex gives Joey back the piece of broccoli, implying that she may be changing her mind about marrying again.
