= Kevin S. Bright =

American television executive producer and director

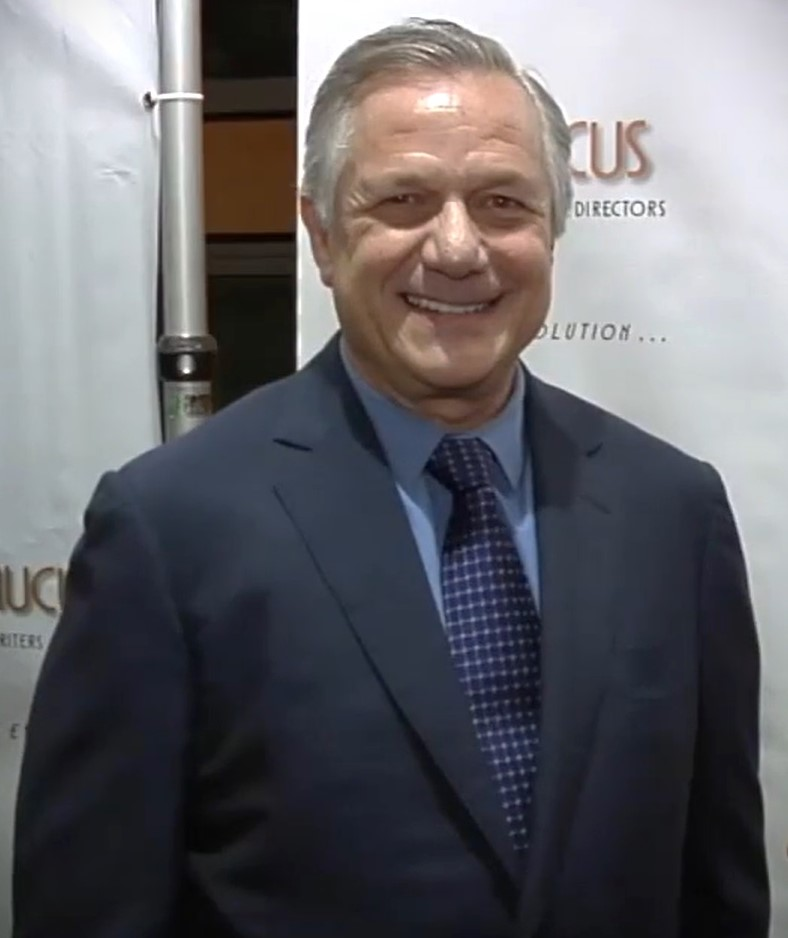
- Bright in 2016
- Born: November 15, 1954 (age 71); New York City, U.S.
- Occupations: Television producer and director
- Notable work: Dream On; Friends

Kevin S. Bright (born November 15, 1954) is an American television executive producer and director. He is best known as the showrunner of the sitcoms Dream On and Friends.

== Early life ==
Born to a Jewish-American family in New York City, Bright attended the East Side Hebrew Institute on the Lower East Side of Manhattan and graduated magna cum laude from Emerson College.

== Career ==
Bright started his professional career under the tutelage of his father, Jackie Bright. After graduation, he worked in New York with Joseph Cates, where he produced specials for George Burns, Johnny Cash, David Copperfield, and Dolly Parton. After moving to Los Angeles in 1982, he started work in comedy programming such as The History of White People in America and comedy specials starring Robin Williams, Martin Mull, Harry Shearer, Paul Shaffer, and Merrill Markoe.

In 1993, Bright entered a partnership with Marta Kauffman and David Crane to form Bright/Kauffman/Crane Productions and began a development deal with Warner Bros. Television to produce the comedy series Friends. He also directed 60 episodes of the series, including the series finale. After Friends, he went on to executive-produce the spin-off series Joey with Friends producers Shana Goldberg-Meehan and Scott Silveri. Joey starred Friends actor Matt LeBlanc as the title character and featured Jennifer Coolidge, also an Emerson College attendee. Joey was cancelled on May 15, 2006, during its second season after a major ratings slump.

After Joey, Bright moved back to Boston where he began working at his alma mater, Emerson College. Over the last four years at Emerson, he executive produced three-sketch comedy shows, Zebro: A Laugh Show and Chocolate Cake City, four original half-hour situation comedies, Browne At Midnight, Saturdays, Ground Floor, and Record Cellar, and a live multi-cam stand-up comedy special, Die Laughing. He also serves as an advisor to The EVVY Awards.

Bright then went on to teach a series of television production classes in the Visual Media Arts department, and helped develop the program for Emerson's new LA Center, which opened in 2013. Kevin ran a diversity workshop for high school students through Emerson College, and worked with Perkins School for the Blind in Watertown, Massachusetts, to develop a method of teaching television production to the blind.

Bright moved back to Los Angeles in 2013, when he was appointed as Founding Director of the Emerson Los Angeles program. There, he has focused on building new programs that take full advantage of the opportunities Emerson's expanded presence in Los Angeles provides. He directed a documentary in 2007 with Linda Feferman called Who Ordered Tax? about his father, Jackie, who was an actor and vaudevillian performer.

In 2016, Bright served as the executive producer of the documentary Best and Most Beautiful Things about Michelle Smith, a woman from Bangor, Maine who is both legally blind and autistic. Bright also directed on CBS comedy Man with a Plan in 2019 for one episode, reuniting with Friends alum Matt LeBlanc.

In 2024, Bright served as an executive producer of the documentary My Own Normal about Alexander Freeman, a filmmaker from Newton, Massachusetts who has cerebral palsy, following his journey of becoming a partner and father and confronting the pain of his parents' reaction. The documentary world premiered at Independent Film Festival Boston.

In 2026, Bright served as producer of the documentary The Bridge, which follows 10 Israeli survivors of the October 7 attacks as they attend Rock 'n Roll Fantasy Camp in Los Angeles to play music alongside members of Van Halen, Whitesnake, Ratt, and Skid Row.

== Personal life ==
Bright lives with his wife, Claudia Wilsey Bright in Saratoga Springs, New York.

== Filmography ==
=== Film ===
Year	Title	Contribution	Notes
1988	Portrait of a White Marriage	Producer	Feature film
2007	Who Ordered Tax?	Executive Producer/Director	Short film
2016	Best and Most Beautiful Things	Executive Producer	Documentary
2016	Jack Krash: Slave to Rock	Executive Producer	Short film
2017	The Lion	Executive Producer/Director	Feature film
2024	My Own Normal	Executive Producer	Documentary
2026	The Bridge	Producer	Documentary

=== Television ===
Year	Title	Contribution	Notes
1979	The Magic of David Copperfield II	Associate Producer	Television Special
1979	Johnny Cash Christmas	Associate Producer	Television Movie
1980	The Magic of David Copperfield III: Levitating Ferrari	Associate Producer	Television Special
1981	Johnny Cash and the Country Girls	Associate Producer	Television Movie
1982	Magic with the Stars	Associate Producer	Television Movie
1982	Madame's Place	Associate Producer	Associate Producer of 51 episodes
1983	Movie Blockbusters: The 15 Greatest Hits of All Time	Associate Producer	Television Documentary
1984	The Magic of David Copperfield VI: Floating Over the Grand Canyond	Producer	Television Special
1985	The Magic of David Copperfield VII: Familiares	Producer	Television Special
1985	FTV	Producer	Episode: "11.23.85"
1985	The Star Games	Producer	unknown episode
1986	George Burns' 90th Birthday Party: A Very Special Special	Associate Producer	Television Special
1986	FTV	Producer	Episode: "2.7.86"
1986	The Magic of David Copperfield: China	Producer	Television Special
1986	The Young Comedians All-Star Reunion	Producer	Television Special
1986	Viva Shaf Vegas	Producer	Television Movie
1987	This Week Indoors	Producer	Television Movie
1987	Martin Mull Live from North Ridgeville, Ohio	Producer	Television Special
1988	The Magic of David Copperfield 10: The Bermuda Triangle	Producer	Television Special
1988	Harry Shearer...The Magic of Love	Producer/Executive Producer	Television Special
1988	Merrill Markoe's Guide to Glamorous Living	Producer/Executive Producer	Television Movie
1990	The American Film Institute Presents: TV or Not TV?	Producer	Television Movie
1990	In Living Color	Supervising Producer	Supervising Producer of 11 episodes Primetime Emmy Award for Outstanding Variety, Music or Comedy Series (1990)
1990	The Late Mr. Pete Show	Executive Producer/Writer	unknown episode
1990–1991	Haywire	Co-Executive Producer	Co-Executive Producer of 2 episodes
1990–1992	Totally Hidden Video	Co-Executive Producer	Co-Executive Producer of 9 episodes
1990–1996	Dream On	Executive Producer/Director	Executive Producer of 105 episodes Writer of 3 episodes CableACE Award for Comedy Series (1992); Nominated - CableACE Award for Comedy Series (1991, 1993–1995)
1991	The Ron Reagan Show	Executive Producer	Executive Producer of 2 episodes
1993	Family Album	Executive Producer/Writer	Executive Producer of 6 episodes Writer of 6 episodes
1994	Couples	Executive Producer	Television Movie
1994	The Adventures of Brisco Country Jr.	Writer	Episode: "And Baby Makes Three"
1994–2004	Friends	Executive Producer/Director	Executive Producer of 236 episodes Director of 54 episodes Primetime Emmy Award for Outstanding Comedy Series (2002); Nominated - Gold Derby Award for Episode of the Year for episode "The Last One (Part 1 & 2)" (2004); Nominated - Online Film & Television Association Award for Best Direction in a Comedy Series (2002); Nominated - Primetime Emmy Award for Outstanding Comedy Series (1995, 1996, 1999, 2000, 2003)
1995	The News Hole	Executive Producer	unknown episode
1997–2000	Veronica's Closet	Executive Producer/Director	Executive Producer of 66 episodes Writer of 2 episodes
1998–2000	Jesse	Executive Producer/Director	Executive Producer of 34 episodes Writer of 5 episodes
2001	DAG	Director	Episode: "The Triangle Report"
2002	Romeo Fire	Executive Producer	Television Movie
2003	The Tracy Morgan Show	Director	Episode: "Haircut Night"
2004–2006	Joey	Executive Producer/Director	Executive Producer of 46 episodes Writer of 19 episodes
2006	Chabad Telethon	Consulting Producer	Television Movie
2006	Love, Inc.	Director	Episode: "Fired Up"
2007	Chabad Telethon	Consulting Producer	Television Movie
2017	Independent Lens	Executive Producer	Episode: "Best and Most Beautiful Things"
2017	Long Day's Journey Into Night: Live	Executive Producer	Television Movie
2019	Man with a Plan	Director	Episode: "Adam Acts His Age"
2021	Friends: The Reunion	Producer	Television special
