= Marta Kauffman =

American television producer (b. 1956)

- Born: Marta Fran Kauffman; September 21, 1956 (age 69); Philadelphia, Pennsylvania, U.S.
- Education: Brandeis University
- Occupations: TV producer, writer
- Known for: Co-creator of Friends
- Spouse: Michael Skloff (m. 1984)
- Children: 3

Marta Fran Kauffman (born September 21, 1956) is an American television writer and producer. She is best known for co-creating the NBC sitcom Friends with her longtime friend, David Crane; Crane and Kauffman similarly were in a friend group with four other people. Crane and Kauffman were also executive producers of the show, along with Kevin S. Bright; and produced Veronica's Closet and Jesse. From 2005 to 2006 she was an executive producer on Related. Both writers were the creators of the HBO series Dream On. Without Crane, she co-created the Netflix series Grace and Frankie.

== Early life and education ==
Born in the Philadelphia suburbs, Kauffman was raised in a conservative Jewish household. Kauffman attended Marple Newtown High School, located in the Marple Newtown School District near Philadelphia, where she was a thespian and student director of the school play "Our Town" in 1974. Kauffman attended Brandeis University and received a BA in theater in 1978. During her time there, she was a sister of Sigma Delta Tau sorority. Kauffman also studied acting at The Neighborhood Playhouse School of the Theater in New York City. She then moved to Sherman Oaks, a suburb of Los Angeles.

== Career ==
Okay Goodnight production company was headed by partners Kauffman, Robbie Rowe Tollin, and Hannah KS Canter. Fox 21 Television Studios signed Okay Goodnight to a multi-year first-look agreement deal in January 2020, starting with The Dreamers novel adaptation; The Littlefield Company is also in the deal.

== Filmography ==
Year	Title	Role	Notes
1987	Everything's Relative	Writer	1 episode
1990–1996	Dream On	Creator, writer (1990–1996), producer (1990 14 episodes), co-executive producer (1991–1992 – 40 episodes), creative consultant	TV series
1991	Sunday Dinner	Writer	1 episode
1992–1993	The Powers That Be	Creator, writer	TV series
1993	Family Album	Co-creator, writer, executive producer (6 episodes)	TV series
1994	Couples	Writer, associate producer	TV movie
1994–2004	Friends	Creator, writer, executive producer, extra	Casting director – uncredited
1997–2000	Veronica's Closet	Creator, writer, executive producer (66 episodes)	TV series
1998–2000	Jesse	Executive producer (34 episodes)	TV series
2005–2006	Related	Executive producer, writer	TV series
2007	Gifted	Executive producer	TV movie special
2008	Blessed Is the Match: The Life and Death of Hannah Senesh	Executive producer	Documentary
2010–2015	Independent Lenses	Executive producer	TV series documentary
2011	Five	Creator, executive producer	TV movie
2012	Hava Nagila: The Movie	Producer	Documentary
2012	Georgia	Writer, director (3 episodes)	TV series
2013	Call Me Crazy: A Five Film	Creator, executive producer	
2014	Mimi and Dona	Executive producer	Documentary
2015–2022	Grace and Frankie	Co-creator, writer, executive producer, director	TV series; alongside Howard J. Morris
2018	Seeing Allred	Producer	Documentary
2018	Beetlejuice The Musical. The Musical. The Musical.	Producer	Musical
2021	Friends: The Reunion	Producer	TV movie special

== Awards and nominations ==
Year	Award	Category	Standing
2002	Primetime Emmy Award	Outstanding Comedy Series – Friends (TV Series)	Winner
2003, 2000, 1999, 1996, 1995	Primetime Emmy Award	Outstanding Comedy Series – Friends (TV Series)	Nominee
1993	Primetime Emmy Award	Outstanding Individual Achievement in Writing in a Comedy Series – Dream On (TV Series)	Nominee
1994, 1993, 1991	CableACE Award	Comedy Series	Nominee
1993	CableACE Award	Writing a Comedy Series – Dream On (TV Series)	Winner
1992	CableACE Award	Comedy Series – Dream On (TV Series)	Winner
2004	Gold Derby Awards – TV Award	Episode of the Year – Friends (TV Series)	Nominee
2002	Online Film & Television Association – Television Award	Best Writing in a Comedy Series – Friends (TV Series)	Winner
2020	PGA Awards	Lifetime Achievement Award in Television	Winner
2004	TV Quick Awards, UK	Best Comedy Show – Friends (TV Series)	Winner
2012	Women's Image Network Awards	Outstanding Show Produced by a Women – Five (Movie)	Winner
