= Top-rated United States television programs of 1997–98 =

This table displays the top-rated primetime television series of the 1997–98 season as measured by Nielsen Media Research.

Rank	Program	Network	Rating
1	Seinfeld	NBC	21.7
2	ER	NBC	20.4
3	Veronica's Closet	NBC	16.6
4	Friends	NBC	16.1
5	Monday Night Football	ABC	15.0
6	Touched by an Angel	CBS	14.2
7	60 Minutes	CBS	13.8
8	Union Square	NBC	13.6
9	CBS Sunday Movie	CBS	13.1
10	Home Improvement	ABC	12.0
10	Frasier	NBC	12.0
12	Just Shoot Me!	NBC	11.9
13	Dateline NBC — Tuesday	NBC	11.5
14	Dateline NBC — Monday	NBC	11.4
15	The Drew Carey Show	ABC	11.1
16	20/20 — Friday	ABC	10.9
17	Primetime Live	ABC	10.8
17	NYPD Blue	ABC	10.8
19	The X-Files	FOX	10.6
20	Law & Order	NBC	10.2
21	20/20 — Monday	ABC	10.0
22	Diagnosis: Murder	CBS	9.8
23	Mad About You	NBC	9.7
23	King of the Hill	FOX	9.7
25	Cosby	CBS	9.5
25	Dharma & Greg	ABC	9.5
27	NBC Sunday Night Movie	NBC	9.4
28	Walker, Texas Ranger	CBS	9.3
28	Hiller and Diller	ABC	9.3
30	The Simpsons	FOX	9.2
30	Everybody Loves Raymond	CBS	9.2
