= Top-rated United States television programs of 1988–89 =

This table displays the top-rated primetime television series of the 1988–89 season as measured by Nielsen Media Research.

Rank	Program	Network	Rating
1	The Cosby Show	NBC	25.6
2	Roseanne	ABC	23.8
3	A Different World	NBC	23.0
4	Cheers	NBC	22.3
5	60 Minutes	CBS	21.7
6	The Golden Girls	NBC	21.4
7	Who's the Boss?	ABC	20.8
8	Murder, She Wrote	CBS	19.9
9	Empty Nest	NBC	19.2
10	Anything but Love	ABC	19.0
11	Dear John	NBC	18.5
12	Matlock	NBC	17.7
13	L.A. Law	NBC	17.6
13	Growing Pains	ABC	17.6
15	ALF	NBC	17.5
15	Monday Night Football	ABC	17.5
17	Unsolved Mysteries	NBC	17.4
18	In the Heat of the Night	NBC	17.3
19	Hunter	NBC	17.2
20	Head of the Class	ABC	17.1
21	Night Court	NBC	16.9
22	The Hogan Family	NBC	16.3
22	NBC Sunday Night Movie	NBC	16.3
22	The Wonder Years	ABC	16.3
25	Amen	NBC	16.2
25	NBC Monday Night Movie	NBC	16.2
27	Knots Landing	CBS	16.1
27	CBS Sunday Movie	CBS	16.1
29	ABC Mystery Movie	ABC	15.4
29	Dallas	CBS	15.4
