= Top-rated United States television programs of 1995–96 =

This table displays the top-rated primetime television series of the 1995–96 season as measured by Nielsen Media Research.

| Rank | Program | Network | Rating |
|---|---|---|---|
| 1 | ER | NBC | 22.0 |
| 2 | Seinfeld | NBC | 21.2 |
| 3 | Friends | NBC | 18.7 |
| 4 | Caroline in the City | NBC | 18.0 |
| 5 | Monday Night Football | ABC | 17.1 |
| 6 | The Single Guy | NBC | 16.7 |
| 7 | Home Improvement | ABC | 16.1 |
| 8 | Boston Common | NBC | 15.6 |
| 9 | 60 Minutes | CBS | 14.2 |
| 10 | NYPD Blue | ABC | 14.1 |
| 11 | 20/20 | ABC | 13.6 |
| 11 | Frasier | NBC | 13.6 |
| 13 | Grace Under Fire | ABC | 13.2 |
| 14 | NBC Monday Movie | NBC | 12.9 |
| 14 | Coach | ABC | 12.9 |
| 16 | The Nanny | CBS | 12.5 |
| 16 | Roseanne | ABC | 12.5 |
| 18 | Walker, Texas Ranger | CBS | 12.3 |
| 18 | Primetime Live | ABC | 12.3 |
| 18 | Murphy Brown | CBS | 12.3 |
| 21 | NBC Sunday Movie | NBC | 12.2 |
| 22 | 3rd Rock from the Sun | NBC | 12.1 |
| 23 | Chicago Hope | CBS | 11.9 |
| 24 | Law & Order | NBC | 11.4 |
| 24 | CBS Sunday Movie | CBS | 11.4 |
| 24 | The Naked Truth | ABC | 11.4 |
| 24 | Can't Hurry Love | CBS | 11.4 |
| 28 | Dateline NBC — Tuesday | NBC | 11.3 |
| 28 | Dateline NBC — Wednesday | NBC | 11.3 |
| 30 | The Dana Carvey Show | ABC | 11.2 |
