= Top-rated United States television programs of 1985–86 =

This table displays the top-rated primetime television series of the 1985–86 season as measured by Nielsen Media Research.

Rank	Program	Network	Rating
1	The Cosby Show	NBC	33.7
2	Family Ties	NBC	30.0
3	Murder, She Wrote	CBS	25.3
4	60 Minutes	CBS	23.9
5	Cheers	NBC	23.7
6	Dallas	CBS	21.9
7	Dynasty	ABC	21.8
7	The Golden Girls	NBC	21.8
9	Miami Vice	NBC	21.3
10	Who's the Boss?	ABC	21.1
11	Night Court	NBC	20.9
12	CBS Sunday Night Movie	CBS	20.5
13	Highway to Heaven	NBC	20.1
14	Kate & Allie	CBS	20.0
15	Monday Night Football	ABC	19.8
16	Newhart	CBS	19.6
17	Knots Landing	CBS	19.5
17	Growing Pains	ABC	19.5
19	You Again?	NBC	19.2
20	227	NBC	18.8
21	NBC Sunday Night Movie	NBC	18.5
22	Hotel	ABC	18.3
22	NBC Monday Night Movie	NBC	18.3
24	Moonlighting	ABC	18.1
24	Falcon Crest	CBS	18.1
24	Valerie	NBC	18.1
27	The Facts of Life	NBC	17.7
28	Scarecrow & Mrs. King	CBS	17.4
29	Simon & Simon	CBS	17.2
30	The A-Team	NBC	16.9

== Primetime specials ==
Rank	Program	Network	Rating
1	Super Bowl XX	NBC	48.3
2	Super Bowl XX - Postgame Show	NBC	35.4
3	You Again?	NBC	34.7
4	1985 World Series Game 7	ABC	32.6
5	NFL Football Runover (1-12-1986)	NBC	31.8
6	Family Ties (2-13-1986)	NBC	30.0
7	North and South (finale - Episode 6)	ABC	29.1
8	North and South (Episode 3)	ABC	29.0
9	The Cosby Show (2-2-1986)	NBC	27.6
10	58th Academy Awards	ABC	27.3

== See also ==
The Final Ratings (All 82 tracked series for the year, listed)
