= Top-rated United States television programs of 1987–88 =

This table displays the top-rated primetime television series of the 1987–88 season as measured by Nielsen Media Research.

Rank	Program	Network	Rating
1	The Cosby Show	NBC	27.8
2	A Different World	NBC	25.0
3	Cheers	NBC	23.4
4	The Golden Girls	NBC	21.8
5	Growing Pains	ABC	21.3
6	Who's the Boss?	ABC	21.2
7	Night Court	NBC	20.8
8	60 Minutes	CBS	20.6
9	Murder, She Wrote	CBS	20.2
10	ALF	NBC	18.8
10	The Wonder Years	ABC	18.8
12	Moonlighting	ABC	18.3
12	L.A. Law	NBC	18.3
14	Matlock	NBC	17.8
15	Amen	NBC	17.5
16	Monday Night Football	ABC	17.4
17	Family Ties	NBC	17.3
18	CBS Sunday Night Movie	CBS	17.2
19	In the Heat of the Night	NBC	17.0
20	My Two Dads	NBC	16.9
20	Valerie's Family	NBC	16.9
22	Dallas	CBS	16.8
23	NBC Sunday Night Movie	NBC	16.7
23	Head of the Class	ABC	16.7
25	Newhart	CBS	16.5
26	NBC Monday Night Movie	NBC	16.4
27	227	NBC	16.3
28	Day by Day	NBC	16.2
29	Hunter	NBC	16.1
30	Aaron's Way	NBC	16.0

== Primetime specials ==
Rank	Program	Network	Rating
1	Super Bowl XXII	ABC	41.9
2	The Cosby Show (11-12-1987)	NBC	33.9
3	AFC Championship Game Runover	NBC	32.9
4	1987 World Series Game 7	ABC	32.6
5	Magnum, P.I. Finale	CBS	32.0
6	60th Academy Awards	ABC	29.4
7	AFC Playoff Runover: Seattle Seahawks at Houston Oilers	NBC	29.1
8	Family Ties (Season 6 opener)	NBC	29.0
9	Day by Day (episode 2)	NBC	28.1
10	1988 Winter Olympics (final Saturday)	ABC	26.4

== Miniseries ==
Rank	Program	Network	Rating
1	Elvis and Me	ABC	24.4
2	Billionaire Boys Club	NBC	21.4
3	Echoes in the Darkness	CBS	21.2
4	The Murder of Mary Phagan	NBC	19.9
5	Poor Little Rich Girl: The Barbara Hutton Story	NBC	19.6
6	Something Is Out There	NBC	19.2
6	Kenny Rogers as The Gambler, Part III: The Legend Continues	CBS	19.2
8	The Bourne Identity	ABC	18.5
9	Sidney Sheldon's Windmills of the Gods	CBS	18.2
10	Bluegrass	CBS	18.0
