= Top-rated United States television programs of 1994–95 =

This table displays the top-rated primetime television series of the 1994–95 season as measured by Nielsen Media Research.

Rank	Program	Network	Rating
1	Seinfeld	NBC	20.6
2	ER	NBC	20.0
3	Home Improvement	ABC	19.5
4	Grace Under Fire	ABC	18.6
5	Monday Night Football	ABC	17.7
6	60 Minutes	CBS	17.2
7	NYPD Blue	ABC	16.5
8	Murder, She Wrote	CBS	15.6
8	Friends	NBC	15.6
10	Roseanne	ABC	15.5
11	Mad About You	NBC	15.2
12	Madman of the People	NBC	14.9
13	Ellen	ABC	14.8
14	Hope and Gloria	NBC	14.6
15	Frasier	NBC	14.5
16	Murphy Brown	CBS	14.1
17	20/20	ABC	14.0
18	CBS Sunday Movie	CBS	13.7
19	NBC Monday Movie	NBC	13.6
20	Me and the Boys	ABC	13.1
21	Dave's World	CBS	12.9
22	Cybill	CBS	12.8
23	ABC Sunday Movie	ABC	12.7
24	The Nanny	CBS	12.5
25	Full House	ABC	12.4
26	Wings	NBC	12.3
27	Law & Order	NBC	12.2
28	NBC Sunday Night Movie	NBC	12.0
29	Chicago Hope	CBS	11.7
29	ABC Monday Night Movie	ABC	11.7
29	The Martin Short Show	NBC	11.7
29	Primetime Live	ABC	11.7
