= Top-rated United States television programs of 1996–97 =

This table displays the top-rated primetime television series of the 1996–97 season as measured by Nielsen Media Research.

Rank	Program	Network	Rating
1	ER	NBC	21.2
2	Seinfeld	NBC	20.5
3	Suddenly Susan	NBC	17.0
4	Friends	NBC	16.8
4	The Naked Truth	NBC	16.8
6	Fired Up	NBC	16.5
7	Monday Night Football	ABC	16.0
8	The Single Guy	NBC	14.1
9	Home Improvement	ABC	14.0
10	Touched by an Angel	CBS	13.6
11	60 Minutes	CBS	13.3
12	20/20	ABC	12.8
13	NYPD Blue	ABC	12.5
14	CBS Sunday Movie	CBS	12.1
15	Primetime Live	ABC	11.9
16	Frasier	NBC	11.8
17	Spin City	ABC	11.7
18	NBC Sunday Movie	NBC	11.5
18	The Drew Carey Show	ABC	11.5
20	Dateline NBC — Tuesday	NBC	11.4
21	Cosby	CBS	11.2
21	The X-Files	FOX	11.2
23	Walker, Texas Ranger	CBS	11.0
23	Mad About You	NBC	11.0
23	Caroline in the City	NBC	11.0
23	NBC Monday Movie	NBC	11.0
27	Law & Order	NBC	10.8
27	3rd Rock from the Sun	NBC	10.8
29	Ellen	ABC	10.6
30	Chicago Hope	CBS	10.5
30	Dateline NBC — Friday	NBC	10.5
30	Cybill	CBS	10.5
