= Top-rated United States television programs of 1998–99 =

This table displays the top-rated primetime television series of the 1998–99 season as measured by Nielsen Media Research.

Rank	Program	Network	Rating
1	ER	NBC	17.8
2	Friends	NBC	15.7
3	Frasier	NBC	15.6
4	Monday Night Football	ABC	14.9
5	Veronica's Closet	NBC	13.7
5	Jesse	NBC	13.7
7	60 Minutes	CBS	13.2
8	Touched by an Angel	CBS	13.1
9	CBS Sunday Movie	CBS	12.0
10	Home Improvement	ABC	11.0
11	Everybody Loves Raymond	CBS	10.6
12	NYPD Blue	ABC	10.5
13	Law & Order	NBC	10.1
14	The Drew Carey Show	ABC	9.9
14	20/20 — Friday	ABC	9.9
16	Providence	NBC	9.8
16	20/20 — Wednesday	ABC	9.8
16	JAG	CBS	9.8
19	Dateline NBC — Tuesday	NBC	9.7
19	Dateline NBC — Monday	NBC	9.7
19	Becker	CBS	9.7
19	CBS Tuesday Movie	CBS	9.7
23	Ally McBeal	FOX	9.6
24	Dharma & Greg	ABC	9.3
25	Spin City	ABC	9.2
25	Walker, Texas Ranger	CBS	9.2
25	Dateline NBC — Friday	NBC	9.2
28	The X-Files	FOX	9.1
28	NBC Sunday Night Movie	NBC	9.1
30	60 Minutes II	CBS	9.0
30	Diagnosis: Murder	CBS	9.0
