= Friends =

American television sitcom (1994–2004)

- Genre: Sitcom
- Created by: David Crane; Marta Kauffman
- Showrunners: David Crane; Marta Kauffman
- Starring: Jennifer Aniston; Courteney Cox; Lisa Kudrow; Matt LeBlanc; Matthew Perry; David Schwimmer
- Theme music composer: Michael Skloff
- Opening theme: "I'll Be There for You" by The Rembrandts
- Composers: Michael Skloff; Ian Christian Nickus (season 2)
- Country of origin: United States
- Original language: English
- No. of seasons: 10
- No. of episodes: 236 (+ 1 special) (list of episodes)

Production
- Executive producers: David Crane; Marta Kauffman; Kevin S. Bright; Michael Borkow (season 4); Michael Curtis (season 5); Adam Chase (seasons 5–6); Greg Malins (seasons 5–7); Wil Calhoun (season 7); Scott Silveri (seasons 8–10); Shana Goldberg-Meehan (seasons 8–10); Andrew Reich (seasons 8–10); Ted Cohen (seasons 8–10)
- Production locations: Warner Bros. Studios, Burbank, California
- Camera setup: Multi-camera
- Running time: 20–22 minutes (per episode); 22–65 minutes (extended international TV & DVD episodes)
- Production companies: Bright/Kauffman/Crane Productions; Warner Bros. Television

Original release
- Network: NBC
- Release: September 22, 1994 – May 6, 2004

Related
- Joey (2004–2006); Friends: The Reunion (2021)

Friends is an American television sitcom created by David Crane and Marta Kauffman, which aired on NBC from September 22, 1994, to May 6, 2004, lasting ten seasons. With an ensemble cast starring Jennifer Aniston, Courteney Cox, Lisa Kudrow, Matt LeBlanc, Matthew Perry, and David Schwimmer, the show revolves around six friends in their 20s and early 30s who live in Manhattan, New York City. The original executive producers were Kevin S. Bright, Kauffman, and Crane.

Kauffman and Crane began developing Friends under the working title Insomnia Cafe between November and December 1993. They presented the idea to Bright, and together they pitched a seven-page treatment of the show to NBC. After several script rewrites and changes, including title changes to Six of One and Friends Like Us, the series was finally named Friends. Filming took place at Warner Bros. Studios in Burbank, California.

All ten seasons of Friends ranked within the top ten of the final television season ratings; ultimately reaching the number 1 spot in its eighth season. The series finale aired on May 6, 2004, and was watched by around 52.5 million American viewers, making it the fifth-most-watched series finale in American television history and the most-watched television episode of the 2000s. Friends received acclaim throughout its run, becoming one of the most popular and highest-grossing television shows of all time. The show's success led to a spin-off series, Joey, and a 2021 reunion special, Friends: The Reunion.

== Cast and characters ==
Main cast

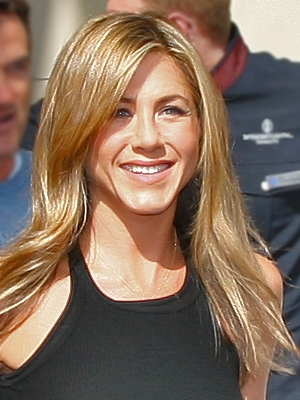
Jennifer Aniston as
Rachel Green

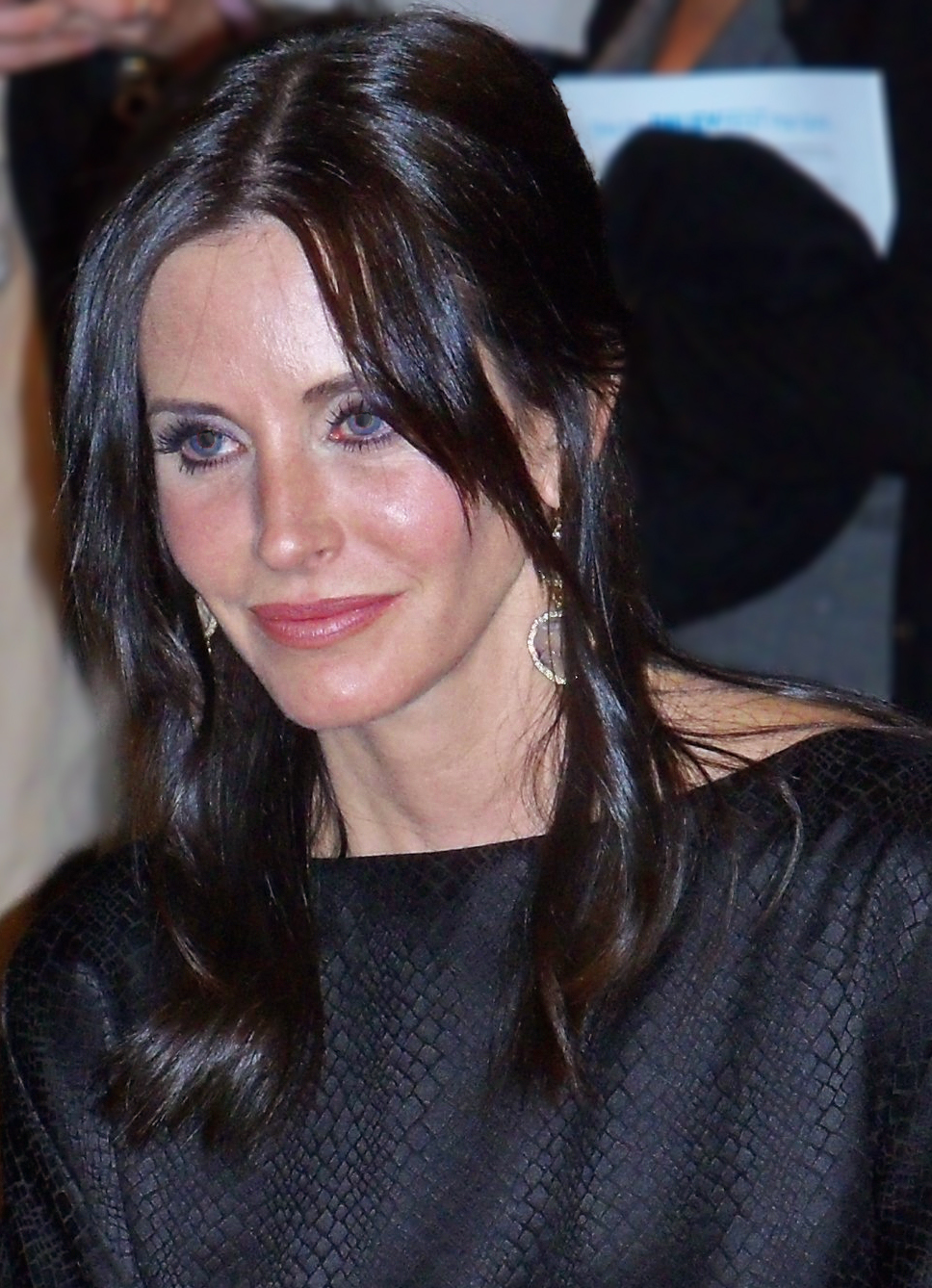
Courteney Cox as
Monica Geller

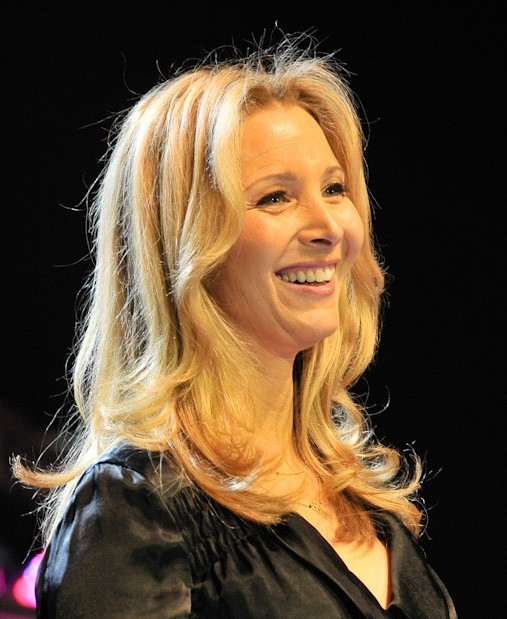
Lisa Kudrow as
Phoebe Buffay

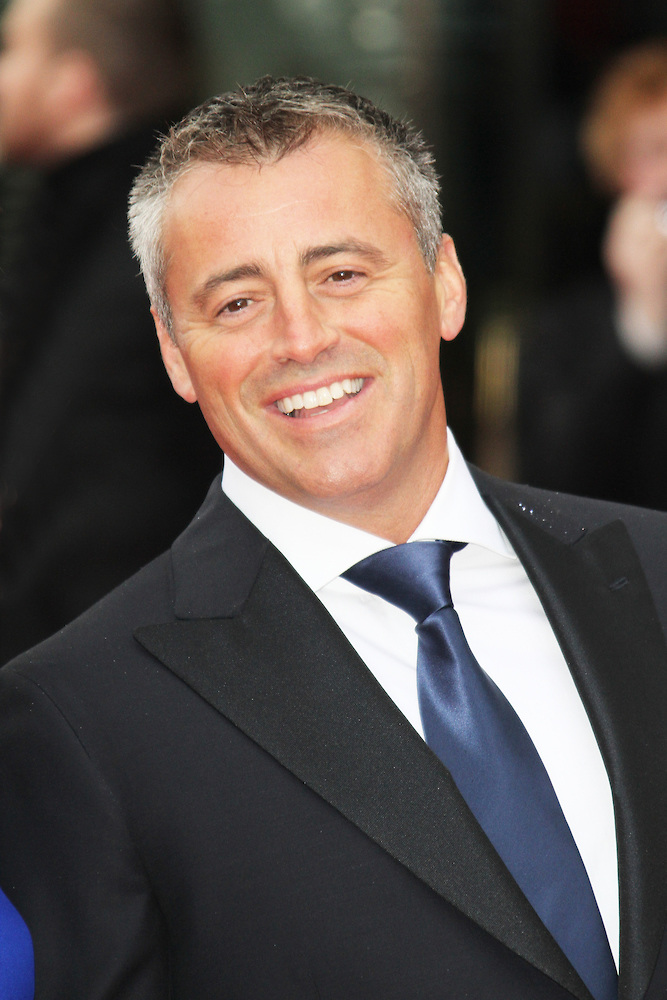
Matt LeBlanc as
Joey Tribbiani

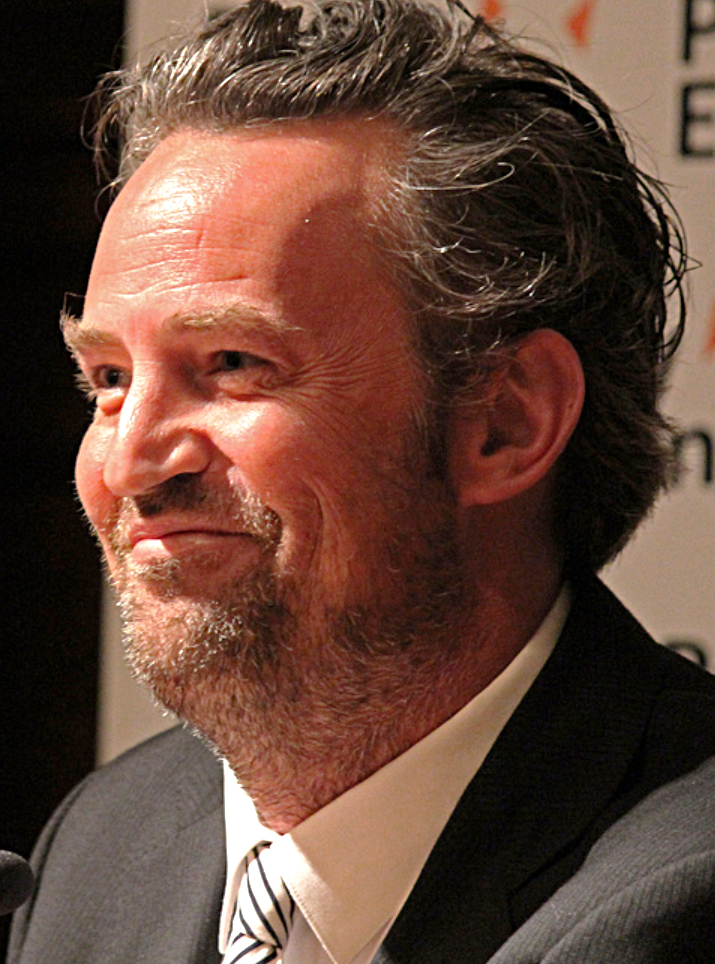
Matthew Perry as
Chandler Bing

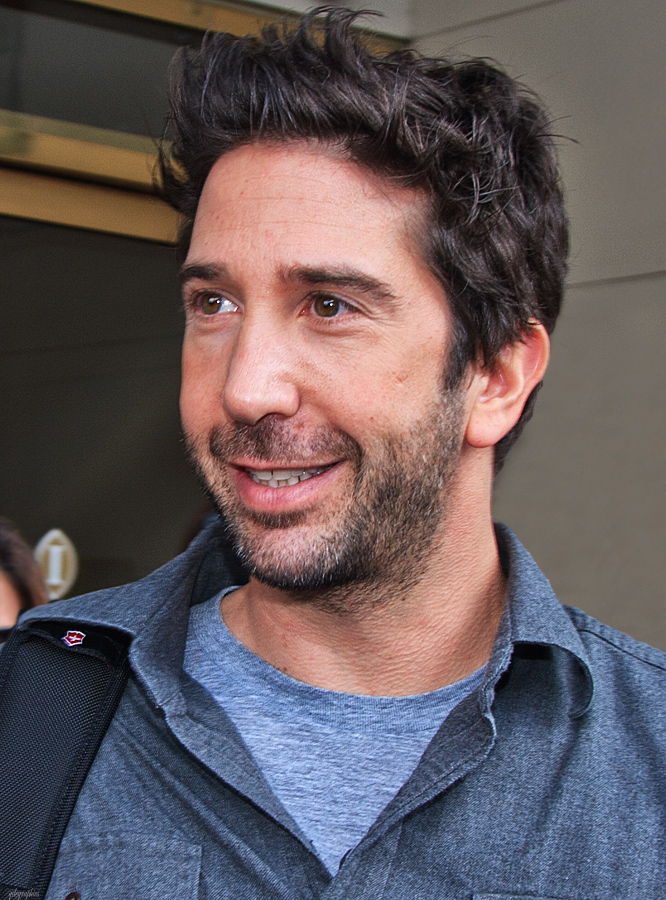
David Schwimmer as
Ross Geller
- Jennifer Aniston as Rachel Green:
  A fashion enthusiast and Monica Geller's best friend from childhood. Rachel first moves in with Monica in season one after nearly marrying Barry Farber. Rachel and Ross Geller are later involved in an on-again, off-again relationship throughout the series. Rachel dates other men during the series, such as Italian neighbor, Paolo, in season one; Joshua Bergin, a client from Bloomingdale's, in season four; Tag Jones, her assistant, in season seven; and Joey Tribbiani, one of her close friends, in season ten. Rachel's first job is as a waitress at the coffee house Central Perk, but she later becomes an assistant buyer at Bloomingdale's in season three, and a buyer at Ralph Lauren in season five. Rachel and Ross have a daughter named Emma Geller-Green in "The One Where Rachel Has a Baby, Part Two" at the end of season eight. In the final episode of the series, Ross and Rachel confess their love for each other, and Rachel gives up a dream fashion job at Louis Vuitton in Paris to be with him.
- Courteney Cox as Monica Geller:
  The "mother hen" of the group and a chef, known for her perfectionist, bossy, competitive, and obsessive-compulsive nature. Monica was overweight as a child. She had a bat mitzvah as a teenager. She works as a chef in various restaurants throughout the show. Monica's first serious relationship is with a long-time family friend Richard Burke, who is 21 years her senior. The two maintain a strong relationship for some time until Richard expresses that he does not want to have children. Monica and Chandler Bing, one of her best friends, later start a relationship after spending a night with each other in London in the season four finale, leading to their marriage in season seven and the adoption of twins Jack and Erica Bing at the end of the series. A running gag in the show is Chandler's easy-going and humorous nature conflicting with Monica's high-maintenance and compulsive behavior.
- Lisa Kudrow as Phoebe Buffay:
  A masseuse, vegetarian and self-taught musician. As a child, Phoebe lived in upstate New York with her mother Lily Buffay, until her mother committed suicide and Phoebe took to the streets. She writes and sings her own strange songs, accompanying herself on the guitar. She has an identical twin named Ursula Buffay, who shares few of Phoebe's traits. Phoebe has three serious relationships over the show's run: David, a scientist, in season one, with whom she breaks up when he moves to Minsk on a research grant; Gary, a police officer whose badge she finds, in season five; and an on-and-off relationship with Mike Hannigan in seasons nine and ten. In season nine, Phoebe and Mike break up due to his desire not to marry. David returns from Minsk, leading to the two getting back together, but she eventually rejects him for Mike when both of them propose to her. Phoebe and Mike marry in season ten.
- Matt LeBlanc as Joey Tribbiani:
  A struggling actor and food lover who becomes famous for his role on soap opera Days of Our Lives as Dr. Drake Ramoray. Joey has many short-term girlfriends. Despite his womanizing, Joey is innocent, caring, and well-intentioned. Joey often uses the catchphrase pick-up line "How you doin'?" in his attempts to win over most of the women he meets. Joey rooms with his best friend Chandler for years, and later with Rachel. He falls in love with Rachel in season eight, but Rachel politely tells Joey that she does not share his feelings. They eventually date briefly in season ten, but after realizing it will not work due to their friendship and Rachel's complicated relationship with Ross, they return to being friends. At the end of the series, he is the only remaining single member of the group, and becomes the main protagonist of the sequel series Joey.
- Matthew Perry as Chandler Bing:
  An executive in statistical analysis and data reconfiguration for a large multinational corporation. Chandler hates this job, although it pays well. He attempts to quit during season one but is lured back with a new office and a pay raise. He eventually quits this job in season nine due to a transfer to Tulsa, Oklahoma. He becomes a junior copywriter at an advertising agency later that season. Chandler has a peculiar family history, being the son of an erotic novelist mother Nora Tyler Bing and a gay, cross-dressing Las Vegas star father Charles Bing. Chandler is known for his sarcastic sense of humor, bad luck in relationships, and tendency to be the butt of all jokes. Despite this, he is still kind and usually serves as the voice of reason in contrast to his more arrogant and selfish friends. Chandler marries Monica, one of his best friends, in season seven, and they adopt twins at the end of the series. Before his relationship with Monica, Chandler dated Janice Hosenstein in season one and subsequently broke up with her many times.
- David Schwimmer as Ross Geller:
  Monica's "geeky" older brother, a PhD palaeontologist working at the American Museum of Natural History, and later a tenured professor of palaeontology at New York University. Ross is involved in an on-again, off-again relationship with Rachel throughout the series. He has three failed marriages during the series: Carol Willick, a lesbian who is also the mother of his son, Ben Geller; Emily Waltham, who divorces him after he accidentally says Rachel's name instead of hers during their wedding vows; and Rachel, as the two drunkenly marry in Las Vegas. His divorces become a running joke within the series. Following a one-night stand, he and Rachel have a daughter, Emma, by the end of season eight. They finally confess that they are still in love with each other in the Season 10 series finale.

James Michael Tyler appears as Gunther, a barista at Central Perk, in every season of the show, but is only ever credited as a guest star. Gunther has a mostly secret profound love for Rachel throughout the entire series. At one point he becomes the manager of the coffee house. It is revealed that Gunther speaks Dutch in addition to English, as well as being a former soap opera actor.

In their original contracts for the first season, cast members were paid $22,500 per episode. The cast members received different salaries in the second season, beginning from the $20,000 range to $40,000 per episode. Before their salary negotiations for the third season, the cast decided to enter collective negotiations, despite Warner Bros.' preference for individual deals. The stars were each paid $75,000 per episode in season three, $85,000 in season four, $100,000 in season five, $125,000 in season six, $750,000 in seasons seven and eight, and $1 million in seasons nine and ten, making Aniston, Cox, and Kudrow the highest-paid TV actresses of all time. The cast also received syndication royalties beginning in 2000 after renegotiations. At the time, that financial benefit of a piece of the show's lucrative back-end profits had only been given out to stars who had ownership rights in a show, like Jerry Seinfeld and Bill Cosby.

Series creator David Crane wanted all six actors to be equally prominent, and the series was lauded as being "the first true 'ensemble' show." The cast members made efforts to keep the ensemble format and not allow one member to dominate; they entered themselves in the same acting categories for awards, opted for collective salary negotiations, and asked to appear together on magazine cover photos in the first season. The cast members also became best friends off-screen, so much so that recurring guest star Tom Selleck reported that he sometimes felt left out.

The cast remained good friends after the series run, most notably Cox and Aniston, with Aniston being godmother to Cox and David Arquette's daughter, Coco. In the official farewell commemorative book Friends 'Til the End, each separately acknowledged in interviews that the cast had become their family.

== Episodes ==
Season	Episodes	Originally released		Rank	Rating	Viewers (millions)
Season	Episodes	First released	Last released	Rank	Rating	Viewers (millions)
1	24	September 22, 1994	May 18, 1995	8	15.6	24.8
2	24	September 21, 1995	May 16, 1996	3	18.7	31.7
3	25	September 19, 1996	May 15, 1997	4	16.8	26.1
4	24	September 25, 1997	May 7, 1998	4	16.1	24.7
5	24	September 24, 1998	May 20, 1999	2	15.7	24.7
6	25	September 23, 1999	May 18, 2000	5	14.0	22.6
7	24	October 12, 2000	May 17, 2001	5	12.6	21.7
8	24	September 27, 2001	May 16, 2002	1	15.0	26.4
9	24	September 26, 2002	May 15, 2003	2	13.5	23.9
10	18	September 25, 2003	May 6, 2004	5	13.6	25.3

=== Season 1 ===
Friends in first season. Front: Cox, Aniston. Back: LeBlanc, Kudrow, Schwimmer, Perry.

The first season introduces the six main characters who live in New York City: Rachel Green, a waitress; professional chef Monica Geller; her paleontologist brother, Ross Geller; free-spirited masseuse Phoebe Buffay; struggling actor Joey Tribbiani; and Ross's college friend, Chandler Bing, whose precise occupation at a corporation is unknown. Rachel arrives at Central Perk, wearing her wedding dress, after leaving her fiancé, Barry Farber (Mitchell Whitfield), an orthodontist, at the altar. She moves into her high school friend Monica's apartment, and gets a waitress job at Central Perk.

Ross, who has had a crush on Rachel since high school, often attempts to declare his feelings for her. However many obstacles stand in his way, including his insecurities, Rachel dating an Italian neighbor named Paolo, and the fact that he is expecting a baby with his lesbian ex-wife, Carol Willick (played first by Anita Barone and then Jane Sibbett), who gives birth to Ben Geller (Cole Sprouse) later in the season. Joey never has a steady girlfriend and constantly sleeps with a variety of women. Phoebe is rather odd and complex, mostly due to her mother Lily Buffay's suicide when she was a child and having lived on the streets for a time. However, the gang loves her regardless.

Chandler breaks up with his girlfriend, Janice Hosenstein (Maggie Wheeler), only to find himself reconnecting with her throughout the series. Near the end of the season, while Ross is at a paleontology dig in China, Chandler accidentally lets slip that Ross loves Rachel, who then realizes that she also cares for him. The season ends with Rachel waiting at the airport for Ross, who is returning from China.

=== Season 2 ===
Rachel greets Ross at the airport only to discover that he has returned with Julie (Lauren Tom), someone he knew from graduate school. Rachel's attempts to tell Ross that she loves him initially mirror his failed attempts in the first season. After he breaks up with Julie for Rachel, friction between them develops when Rachel discovers Ross's list of the cons of dating her. They eventually begin a relationship after Rachel sees an old home video from her and Monica's prom night and realizes Ross was going to stand in for her prom date Chip Matthews (Dan Gauthier) who nearly stood her up.

Monica is promoted to head chef at the Iridium restaurant, then gets fired for accepting gifts from a supplier, which is against company policy. Needing money, she is forced to take an embarrassing job as a waitress at a 1950s-style diner. She begins dating Richard Burke (Tom Selleck), a recently divorced family friend who is 21 years her senior. They eventually break up when Monica realizes that Richard, already a father, does not want more children. Joey is cast in a fictional version of the soap opera, Days of Our Lives as neurosurgeon Dr. Drake Ramoray. He moves out of his and Chandler's apartment, forcing Chandler to get a new roommate, Eddie Menuek (Adam Goldberg).

However, Eddie is annoying and somewhat deranged. When Joey claims in a soap opera magazine interview that he writes many of his own lines, offending the show's writer (James E. Reilly), his character is killed off. No longer able to afford his expensive new apartment, Joey moves back in with Chandler, kicking Eddie out in the process. In the season finale, Chandler talks to an anonymous woman in an online chat room. When they agree to meet in person, the woman turns out to be Janice.

=== Season 3 ===
Season 3 takes on a significantly more serialized format. Chandler and Janice date for several episodes until Joey catches Janice kissing her soon-to-be ex-husband Gary Litman (Mark Cohen). Not wanting to destroy her family, Chandler urges Janice to go back to Gary, then becomes depressed over the breakup for several episodes. Rachel quits her job at Central Perk and begins working at Bloomingdale's, an upscale department store chain. Ross soon becomes jealous of her colleague Mark Robinson (Steven Eckholdt) and frustrated by Rachel's long work hours. She is tired of his constant jealousy and insecurity, and decides they need a relationship break.

Ross, hurt and somewhat drunk, immediately sleeps with Chloe (Angela Featherstone), "the hot girl from the Xerox place," causing Rachel to break up with him completely. Although Phoebe initially believes she has no family except her twin sister Ursula Buffay (Lisa Kudrow), she learns she has a half-brother, Frank Buffay Jr. (Giovanni Ribisi) and discovers her birth mother, Phoebe Abbott (Teri Garr) over the course of the season. Joey falls in love with his acting partner Kate Miller (Dina Meyer), but is jealous of her dating Marshall Townend (Reg Rogers) the director of their play. They begin a brief relationship that ends when she takes an acting job in Los Angeles.

Monica dates millionaire Pete Becker (Jon Favreau), despite her initially not being attracted to him. However, she breaks up with Pete after he is seriously hurt trying to become the Ultimate Fighting Champion and refuses to quit. Phoebe sets Ross up on a date with her friend, Bonnie (Christine Taylor), inciting Rachel's jealousy. She tries sabotaging the relationship by coercing Bonnie to shave her head bald, and eventually admits to Ross that she still has feelings for him. The season closes with Ross having to choose between Rachel and Bonnie.

=== Season 4 ===
In the season 4 premiere, after Ross breaks up with Bonnie, he and Rachel briefly reconcile after Ross pretends to read a long letter that Rachel wrote for him. However, Ross continues to insist that the two were on a break when he slept with Chloe, so they break up again. Joey dates Kathy (Paget Brewster), a girl that Chandler has a crush on. Kathy and Chandler later kiss, which causes drama between Chandler and Joey. Joey only forgives Chandler and allows him to date Kathy after Chandler spends Thanksgiving in a box as punishment.

Chandler's relationship with Kathy ends after he discovers that she cheated on him due to an argument. Phoebe loses her job as a masseuse after making out with one of her clients Rick Sanoven (Jason Brooks) and she accompanies Monica, who has become a caterer for hire. They soon start a catering business together but Monica, after negatively reviewing a restaurant, Allesandro's, is offered the position of head chef. Despite initially being pressured by the wrath of her co-workers, Monica eventually asserts her dominance in the kitchen. Phoebe becomes a surrogate for her brother and his fiancée, Alice Knight (Debra Jo Rupp).

Monica and Rachel are forced to switch apartments with Joey and Chandler after losing a bet during a quiz game, but manage to switch back by bribing them with Knicks season tickets and a one-minute kiss (off-screen) between each other. After her boss Joanna (Alison La Placa) dies, Rachel is demoted to personal shopping and meets and later dates a customer named Joshua Burgin (Tate Donovan). Ross begins dating an English woman named Emily Waltham (Helen Baxendale), and they quickly get engaged. Rachel struggles to cope and hastily suggests to Joshua that they marry, after which he rejects her. In the season finale, the group, apart from Rachel and a heavily pregnant Phoebe, travel to Ross and Emily's wedding in London. Chandler and Monica sleep together, and Rachel, realizing that she is still in love with Ross, rushes to London to stop Ross and Emily's wedding, but changes her mind when she sees them happy together. While saying his vows, Ross accidentally says Rachel's name at the altar, shocking his bride Emily and the guests.

=== Season 5 ===
Ross and Emily marry, but an angry and humiliated Emily flees the reception. Rachel soon admits her love for Ross, but realizing how ridiculous this is, advises him to work on his marriage to Emily. She develops a crush on her neighbor Danny (George Newbern) and they date briefly, until she realizes that he is too close with his sister Krista (Julie Lauren). Monica and Chandler try to keep their new relationship a secret from their friends. Phoebe gives birth to triplets in the show's 100th episode. She gives birth to a boy, Frank Buffay Jr. Jr., and two girls, Leslie and Chandler Buffay, the latter of whom was supposed to be a boy, but was later revealed to be a girl.

After weeks of trying to contact her, Emily agrees to reconcile with Ross and move to New York if he breaks off all communication with Rachel. Ross agrees, but later attends a dinner with all his friends, Rachel included. Emily phones Ross, discovers Rachel is there, realizes she does not trust him and ends their marriage. Ross takes out his anger at work, resulting in him being indefinitely suspended from the museum, and he moves in with Chandler and Joey until eventually getting a new apartment across the street from them.

Rachel gets a new job at Ralph Lauren. Phoebe has a brief relationship with a police officer, Gary (Michael Rapaport), after finding his badge and using it as her own. Monica and Chandler go public with their relationship, to the surprise and delight of their friends. They decide to get married on a trip to Las Vegas, but change their plans after witnessing Ross and Rachel drunkenly stumbling out of the wedding chapel.

=== Season 6 ===
In the season 6 premiere, Ross and Rachel's marriage turns out to be a drunken mistake that neither remembers until the other friends mention it. Ross promises Rachel he will get them an annulment, then secretly does nothing because he cannot face having three failed marriages. By the time Rachel discovers they are still married, an annulment is impossible due to their history; they are forced to get a divorce. After ignoring the numerous signs that they should get married, Monica and Chandler decide to live together, forcing Rachel to move in with Phoebe. Joey gets a new roommate, Janine LaCroix (Elle Macpherson).

Joey and Janine develop feelings for each other and date briefly until Janine criticizes Monica and Chandler, ending the relationship. After Janine moves out, Joey struggles with paying his bills so he takes a job at Central Perk. He soon lands a role on a cable TV series called Mac and C.H.E.E.S.E., starring alongside a crime-fighting robot. Ross gets a teaching job at New York University. He dates Elizabeth Stevens (Alexandra Holden), a student, despite it being against university policy. Elizabeth's father, Paul Stevens (Bruce Willis), disapproves of Ross but falls for Rachel, and they start dating.

Both relationships soon end: Elizabeth is too immature for Ross, and previously reserved Paul opens up emotionally and is more than Rachel can handle. Phoebe and Rachel's apartment catches fire, and Rachel moves in with Joey, while Phoebe stays with Chandler and Monica, though they later switch. While at a museum that has a two-year wait for weddings, Monica puts her name on the reservation list as a joke. When Chandler intercepts the museum's phone call about a cancellation, he panics; however, Chandler has been planning to propose while pretending he may never want to marry.

While dining at a fancy restaurant, Chandler's planned proposal is subverted by Monica's ex-boyfriend Richard Burke, who unexpectedly shows up. Richard later tells Monica he wants to marry her and have children. Monica becomes upset at Chandler, believing his ruse about not wanting to marry. Chandler believes Monica has left him until he comes home to find their apartment decorated with candles and her waiting to propose to him. When she becomes too emotional to continue, Chandler proposes and she accepts.

=== Season 7 ===
The seventh season mainly follows Monica and Chandler as they plan their wedding amid various problems. Joey's television series, Mac and C.H.E.E.S.E is canceled, but he is offered his old role on Days of Our Lives; the show is retconned with the revelation that Dr. Drake Ramoray has been in a four-year coma and is revived with a brain transplant from Cecilia Monroe (Susan Sarandon)'s character Jessica Lockhart. Phoebe's repaired apartment now has one large bedroom instead of the original two, so Rachel permanently stays at Joey's. Rachel is promoted at Ralph Lauren and impulsively hires a young assistant, Tag Jones (Eddie Cahill), based on his looks, passing over a more qualified woman Hilda (Jean St. James). Tag discovers her feelings about him at Thanksgiving dinner, and they begin dating, hiding it from co-workers. However, on her 30th birthday, Rachel ends their relationship, realizing Tag is too young and immature, particularly if she intends to follow her marriage schedule.

Hours before Monica and Chandler's wedding ceremony, Chandler panics and goes into hiding just as Phoebe and Rachel find a positive pregnancy test in Monica and Chandler's bathroom. They assume Monica is pregnant. Ross and Phoebe find Chandler and convince him to return for the ceremony, though he briefly bolts again after overhearing Phoebe and Rachel discussing the pregnancy test. He quickly returns, embracing the idea of fatherhood. After the ceremony, Monica denies she is pregnant; unbeknown to everyone, the positive pregnancy test is Rachel's.

=== Season 8 ===
Season 8 begins at Monica and Chandler's wedding reception. Phoebe and Monica discover Rachel's pregnancy and persuade her to take another test to confirm it. Phoebe initially claims the test is negative, badly disappointing Rachel, then reveals it is positive, saying Rachel now knows how she really feels about having a baby. Ross is eventually revealed to be the father, and the season revolves around Rachel's pregnancy. Rachel and Ross agree to be co-parents without resuming their romantic relationship; Ross begins dating Mona (Bonnie Somerville), who is Monica's co-worker from Allesandro's.

Joey takes Rachel out to quell her fears about motherhood, and realizes he has romantic feelings for her. While suppressing his feelings, he encourages Rachel to stay at Ross's apartment so he can be involved in the pregnancy. The arrangement is too much for Mona, and she breaks up with Ross. Joey tells Ross about his feelings for Rachel. Ross initially is angry, then gives his blessing. Joey tells Rachel that he loves her, but she realizes she does not feel the same way, and they remain friends. When Rachel goes into labor, Ross's mother Judy Geller (Christina Pickles) gives him a family heirloom ring and encourages him to propose to Rachel. Ross hesitates, and puts the ring in his jacket, which he later leaves in Rachel's room.

After Monica jokes about having kids, she and Chandler decide to have a baby, starting while they are still at the hospital. After a prolonged labor, during which numerous other expectant mothers, including Janice, are taken to the delivery room, Rachel gives birth to baby Emma Geller-Green. She is left saddened and afraid after Janice later says that Ross may not always be there for her and the baby. When Joey comforts Rachel, the ring falls from Ross's jacket to the floor. Joey kneels to pick it up, and Rachel, believing he is proposing, impulsively says yes. Meanwhile, Ross intends to ask Rachel if she wants to resume their relationship.

=== Season 9 ===
Season nine begins with Ross and Rachel cohabitating with their daughter Emma, after Joey and Rachel clear up the proposal misunderstanding. Monica and Chandler run into obstacles as they try for a baby: Chandler unknowingly agrees to a work transfer to Tulsa just as Monica is offered a head chef job at a new restaurant, Javu, resulting in Chandler commuting back and forth. After being apart from Monica during Christmas, Chandler quits to pursue a new career in advertising, starting as an unpaid intern at an ad agency, and eventually being hired as a junior copywriter. Monica and Chandler discover they are physically incompatible to conceive and after considering multiple options, decide to adopt.

Phoebe begins dating Mike Hannigan (Paul Rudd) for most of the season until Mike says that he never wants to marry again. Phoebe dates her ex-boyfriend from season 1, David (Hank Azaria) who plans on proposing to her, but Mike proposes first. Phoebe rejects both proposals but gets back together with Mike, only needing the reassurance that they have a future together. Rachel, believing that her co-worker Gavin Mitchell (Dermot Mulroney) is trying to steal her job while she is on maternity leave, returns to Ralph Lauren early. She discovers at her birthday party that Gavin has feelings for her. They kiss but do not pursue a relationship due to her history with Ross.

Meanwhile, Ross, having seen the kiss, retaliates by dating other women. After realizing that her and Ross's living situation is too weird, Rachel and Emma move in with Joey. Rachel develops a crush on him, only to be disheartened when he starts dating Charlie Wheeler (Aisha Tyler), a new palaeontology professor to whom Ross is attracted. In the finale, the group travels to Barbados for Ross's keynote speech at a conference. Joey and Charlie break up upon realizing they have nothing in common. Joey then learns about Rachel's feelings for him, but says they cannot pursue this because of Ross. However, upon seeing Ross and Charlie kiss each other, he goes to Rachel's hotel room, and the finale ends with them kissing.

=== Season 10 ===
The tenth season brings several long-running story lines to a close. Joey and Rachel try to contend with Ross's feelings about their relationship, and after disastrous attempts to consummate, decide it is best they remain friends. Charlie breaks up with Ross to get back together with her ex-boyfriend Dr. Benjamin Hobart (Greg Kinnear). Mid-season, Joey officiates Phoebe and Mike's wedding outside the Central Perk coffee house after a snow storm paralyzes the city, preventing them and guests getting to the wedding venue. Monica and Chandler are chosen by a pregnant woman named Erica (Anna Faris) to adopt her baby.

Following this, Monica and Chandler prepare to move to a house in the suburbs to raise their family, saddening everyone, particularly Joey, who is coping with all the changes in his life. In the series finale, Erica gives birth to fraternal twins Jack and Erica Bing, much to Monica and Chandler's surprise. Rachel is fired from Ralph Lauren after her boss Mr. Zelner (Steve Ireland) overhears her interviewing for a job at Gucci. She encounters her former Bloomingdale co-worker Mark, who offers her a new job at Louis Vuitton in Paris. Ross, believing Rachel wants to stay, tries bribing Mr. Zelner to rehire her until he realizes Rachel wants to go to Paris. When Rachel says a tearful personal goodbye to everyone except Ross at her going away party, a hurt and angry Ross confronts Rachel, and they end up sleeping together.

Rachel leaves, and Ross – realizing how much he loves Rachel – chases her to the airport. When he reaches her, Rachel says she has to go to Paris. Before the plane takes off, Rachel calls Ross's home phone and leaves a voice mail, apologizing for the way it ended. While speaking, she realizes that she loves him too, and gets off the plane at the last minute. The series ends with all the friends, plus Monica and Chandler's new babies, leaving the empty apartment together for a final cup of coffee at Central Perk. The show ends first with a shot of everyone's keys to Monica and Chandler's apartment left on the counter top, and then pans to a shot of the apartment's purple door.

== Production ==
=== Conception ===
It's about sex, love, relationships, careers, a time in your life when everything's possible. And it's about friendship because when you're single and in the city, your friends are your family.

— The original treatment used by David Crane, Marta Kauffman and Kevin Bright to pitch the series to NBC.

David Crane and Marta Kauffman began developing three new television pilots that would premiere in 1994 after their sitcom Family Album was cancelled by CBS in 1993. Kauffman and Crane decided to pitch the series about "six people in their 20s making their way in Manhattan" to NBC since they thought it would fit best there. (Film director and screenwriter Cameron Crowe has asserted that the concept originated with Warner Bros. Television wanting him to make his 1992 movie Singles into a television show. Crowe alleges that when he refused permission, the idea was then taken over by Crane and Kaufman, who changed some details from the premise of the movie while developing the show.)

Crane and Kauffman presented the idea to their production partner Kevin Bright, who had served as executive producer on their HBO series Dream On. The idea for the series was conceived when Crane and Kauffman began thinking about the time when they had finished college and started living by themselves in New York; Kauffman believed they were looking at a time when the future was "more of a question mark." They found the concept to be interesting, as they believed "everybody knows that feeling", and because it was also how they felt about their own lives at the time. The team titled the series Insomnia Cafe and pitched the idea as a seven-page treatment to NBC in December 1993.

At the same time, Warren Littlefield, the then-president of NBC Entertainment, was seeking a comedy involving young people living together and sharing expenses after he regretted passing on the Black sitcom Living Single. Littlefield wanted the group to share memorable periods of their lives with friends, who had become "new, surrogate family members." However, Littlefield found difficulty in bringing the concept to life and found the scripts developed by NBC to be terrible. When Kauffman, Crane and Bright pitched Insomnia Cafe, Littlefield was impressed that they knew who their characters were. NBC bought the idea as a put pilot, meaning they risked financial penalties if the pilot was not filmed.

Kauffman and Crane took three days to write the pilot script for a show they titled Friends Like Us. Littlefield wanted the series to "represent Generation X and explore a new kind of tribal bonding", but the rest disagreed. Crane argued that it was not a series for one generation, and wanted to produce a series that everyone would enjoy watching. NBC liked the script and ordered the series. They changed the title to Six of One, mainly because they felt Friends Like Us was too similar to the ABC sitcom These Friends of Mine.

=== Casting ===
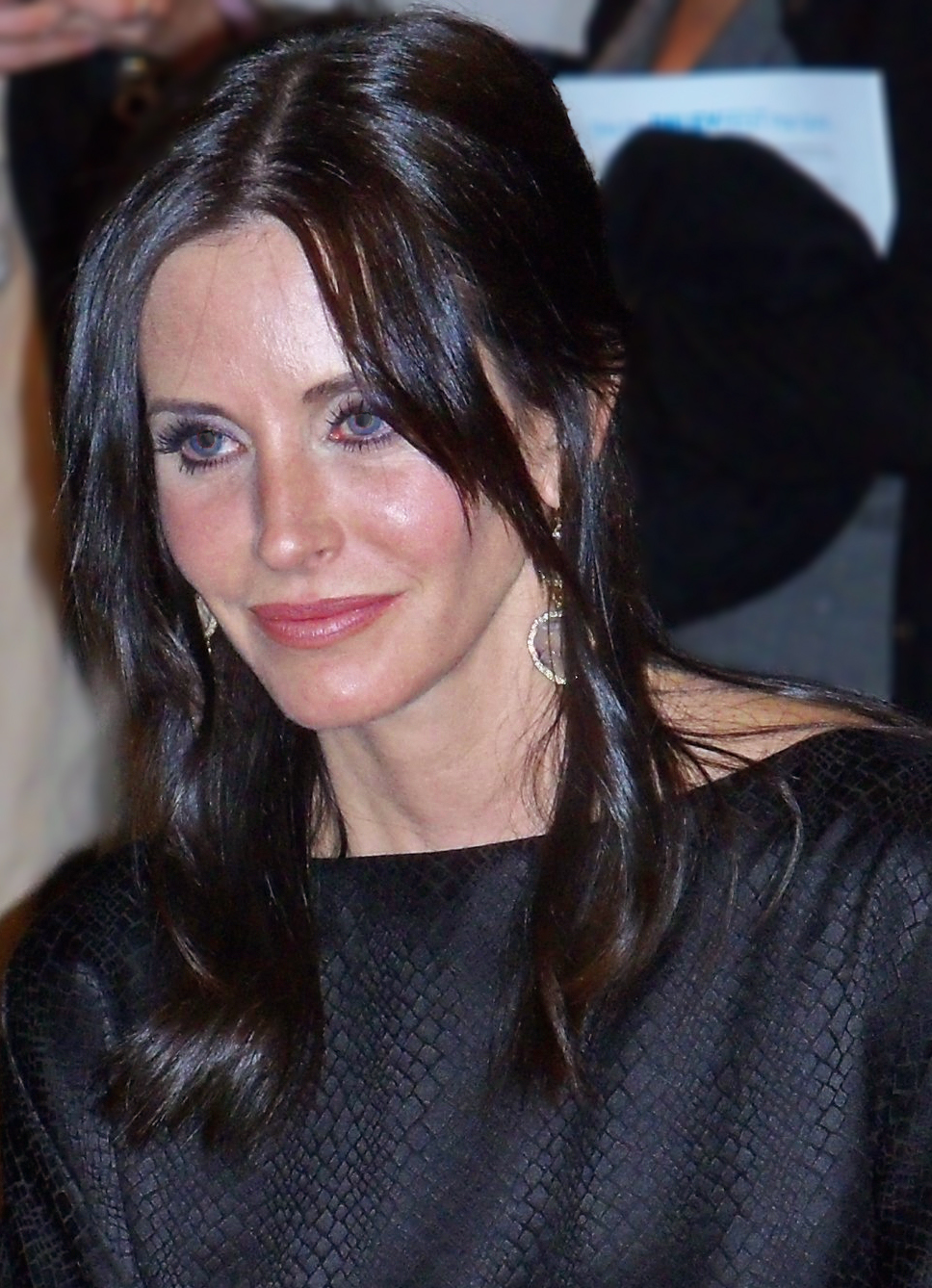
The producers wanted Courteney Cox (pictured) to portray Rachel; however, Cox wanted to play Monica and co-creator Marta Kauffman agreed after watching the audition.

Once it became apparent that the series was a favored project at NBC, Littlefield reported that he was getting calls from every agent in town, wanting their client to be a part of the series. Auditions for the lead roles took place in New York and Los Angeles. The casting director shortlisted 1,000 actors who had applied for each role down to 75. Those who received a callback read in front of Crane, Kauffman and Bright. At the end of March, the number of potential actors had been reduced to three or four for each part, and these actors were asked to read for Les Moonves, then president of Warner Bros. Television.

Having worked with David Schwimmer in the past, the series creators wrote the character of Ross Geller with him in mind, and he was the first actor cast. Courteney Cox wanted to play the role of Monica Geller because she liked the "strong" character, but the producers had her in mind to play Rachel Green because of her "cheery, upbeat energy", which was not how they envisioned Monica; after Cox's audition, though, Kauffman agreed with Cox, and she got the role. When Matt LeBlanc auditioned for Joey Tribbiani, he put a "different spin" on the character. He played Joey more simple-minded than intended and gave the character heart. Although Crane and Kauffman did not want LeBlanc for the role at the time, they were told by the network to cast him. Jennifer Aniston, Matthew Perry and Lisa Kudrow were cast as Rachel, Chandler Bing and Phoebe Buffay based on their auditions. Perry and Aniston, both still under contract to other shows that year, LAX 2194 and Muddling Through, were cast days before shooting of the pilot began.

More changes occurred to the series's storylines during the casting process. The writers found that they had to adjust the characters they had written to suit the actors, and the discovery process of the characters occurred throughout the first season. Kauffman acknowledged that Joey's character became "this whole new being", and that "it wasn't until we did the first Thanksgiving episode that we realized how much fun Monica's neuroses are."

=== Writing ===
In the weeks after NBC's pick up of Friends, Crane, Kauffman and Bright reviewed sent-in scripts that writers had originally prepared for other series, mainly unproduced Seinfeld episodes. Kauffman and Crane hired a team of seven young writers because "When you're 40, you can't do it anymore. The networks and studios are looking for young people coming in out of college." The creators felt that using six equal characters, rather than emphasizing one or two, would allow for "myriad storylines and give the show legs." The majority of the storyline ideas came from the writers, although the actors added ideas. Although the writers originally planned the big love story to be between Joey and Monica, the idea of a romantic interest between Ross and Rachel emerged during the period when Kauffman and Crane wrote the pilot script.

During the production of the pilot, NBC requested that the script be changed to feature one dominant storyline and several minor ones, but the writers refused, wanting to keep three storylines of equal weight. NBC also wanted the writers to include an older character to balance out the young ones. Crane and Kauffman were forced to comply and wrote a draft of an early episode that featured "Pat the Cop" who would be used to provide advice to the other characters. Crane found the storyline to be terrible, and Kauffman joked, "You know the kids [sic] book, Pat the Bunny? We had Pat the Cop." NBC eventually relented and dropped the idea.

Each summer, the producers would outline the storylines for the subsequent season. Before an episode went into production, Kauffman and Crane would revise the script written by another writer, mainly if something concerning either the series or a character felt foreign. The hardest episodes to write were always "the first one and the last one of each season." Unlike other storylines, the idea for a relationship between Joey and Rachel was decided on halfway through the eighth season. The creators did not want Ross and Rachel to get back together so soon, and while looking for a romantic impediment, a writer suggested Joey's romantic interest in Rachel.

The storyline was incorporated into the season; however, when the actors feared that the storyline would make their characters unlikable, the storyline was wrapped up, until it again resurfaced in the season's finale. For the ninth season, the writers were unsure about the amount of storyline to give to Rachel's baby Emma Geller-Green, as they wanted the show neither to revolve around a baby nor pretend there to be none. Crane said that it took them a while to accept the idea of a tenth season, which they decided to do because they had enough stories left to tell to justify the season. Kauffman and Crane would not have signed on for an eleventh season, even if all the cast members had wanted to continue.

The episode title format—"The One ..."—was created when the producers realized that the episode titles would not be featured in the opening credits, and therefore would be unknown to most of the audience. Episode titles officially begin with "The One ..." except the title of the pilot episode and the series finale "The Last One". The season 5 episode "The One Hundredth" has the alternative title of "The One with the Triplet".

While the creators of the show didn't consciously consider religion in their original character breakdowns, Crane said especially storylines connected to Ross originated from the fact that the creators and about half the writers were Jewish. He also stated that "in our minds I guess [Rachel Green] was Jewish. You can't create a character with the name 'Rachel Green' and not from the get-go make some character choices."

=== Filming ===
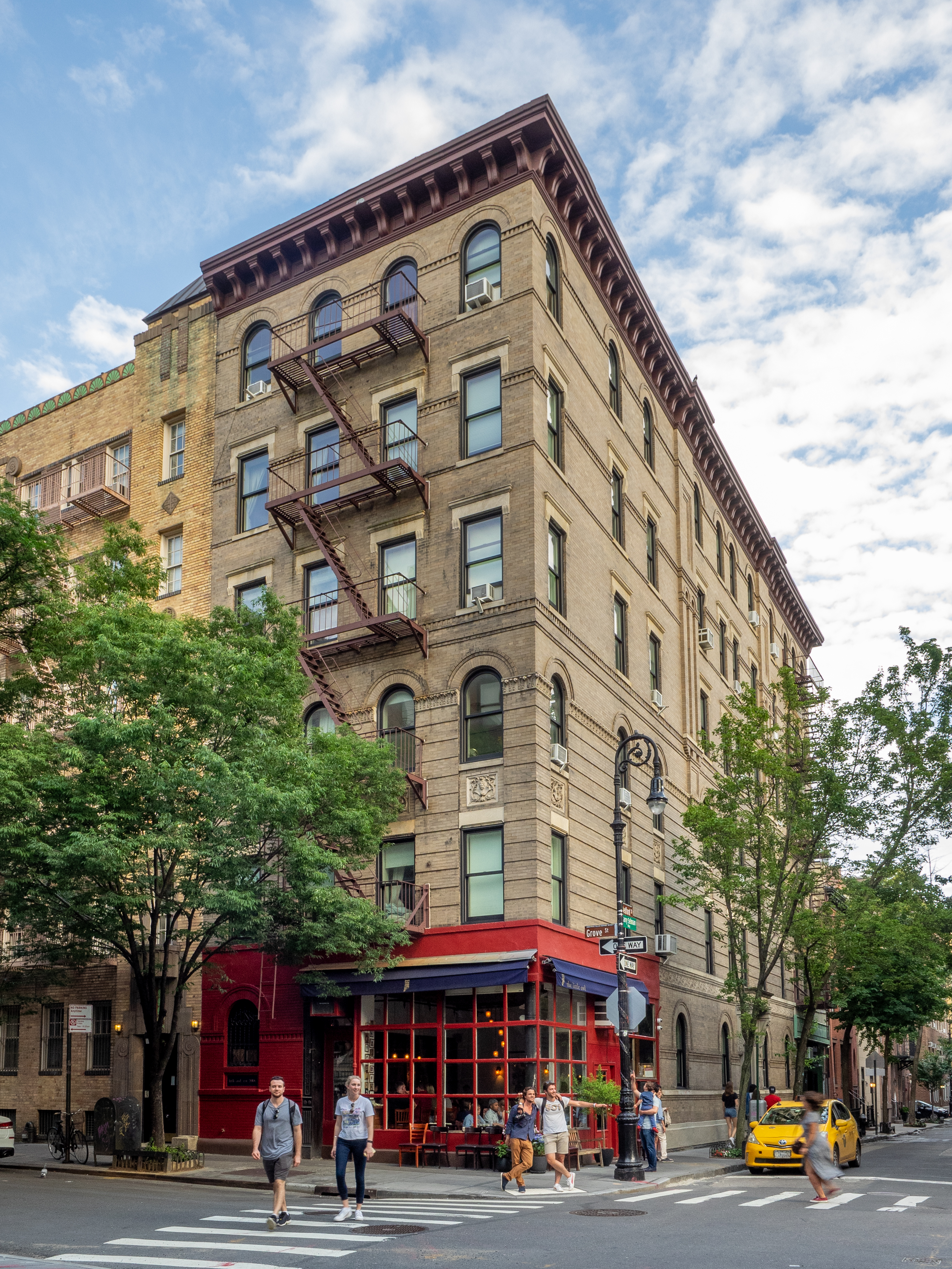
The Greenwich Village building, 90 Bedford Street, used as the friends' apartment block in establishing shots

The first season was shot on Stage 5 at Warner Bros. Studios in Burbank, California. NBC executives had worried that the coffee house setting was too hip and asked for the series to be set in a diner, but eventually consented to the coffee house concept. The opening title sequence was filmed in a fountain at the Warner Bros. Ranch at 4:00 am, while it was particularly cold for a Burbank morning. At the beginning of the second season, production moved to the larger Stage 24, which was renamed The Friends Stage after the series finale.

Filming for the series began during the summer of 1994 in front of a live audience, who were given a summary of the series to familiarize themselves with the six main characters. A hired comedian entertained the studio audience of 300 people between takes. Each 22-minute episode took six hours to film—twice the length of most sitcom tapings—mainly due to the several retakes and rewrites of the script.

Although the producers always wanted to find the right stories to take advantage of being on location, Friends was never shot in New York. Bright felt that filming outside the studio made episodes less funny, even when shooting on the lot outside, and that the live audience was an integral part of the series. When the series was criticized for incorrectly depicting New York, with the financially struggling group of friends being able to afford huge apartments, Bright noted that the set had to be big enough for the cameras, lighting, and "for the audience to be able to see what's going on". The apartments also needed to provide a place for the actors to execute the actions in the scripts.

The fourth-season finale was shot on location in London because the producers were aware of the series' popularity in the UK. The scenes were shot in a studio with three audiences each made up of 500 people. These were the show's largest audiences throughout its run. The fifth-season finale, set in Las Vegas, was filmed at Warner Bros. Studios, although Bright met people who thought it was filmed on location.

== Series finale ==
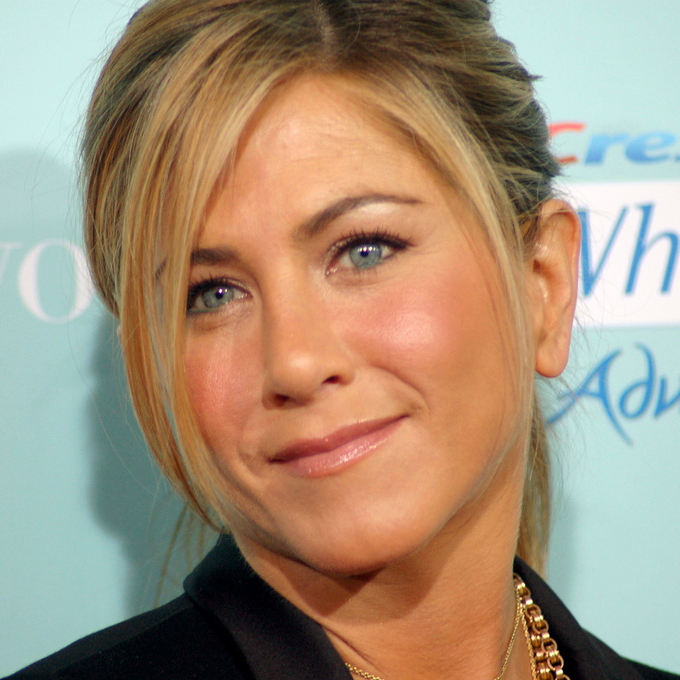
The cast was emotional while filming the final episode. Jennifer Aniston explained, "We're like very delicate china right now, and we're speeding toward a brick wall."

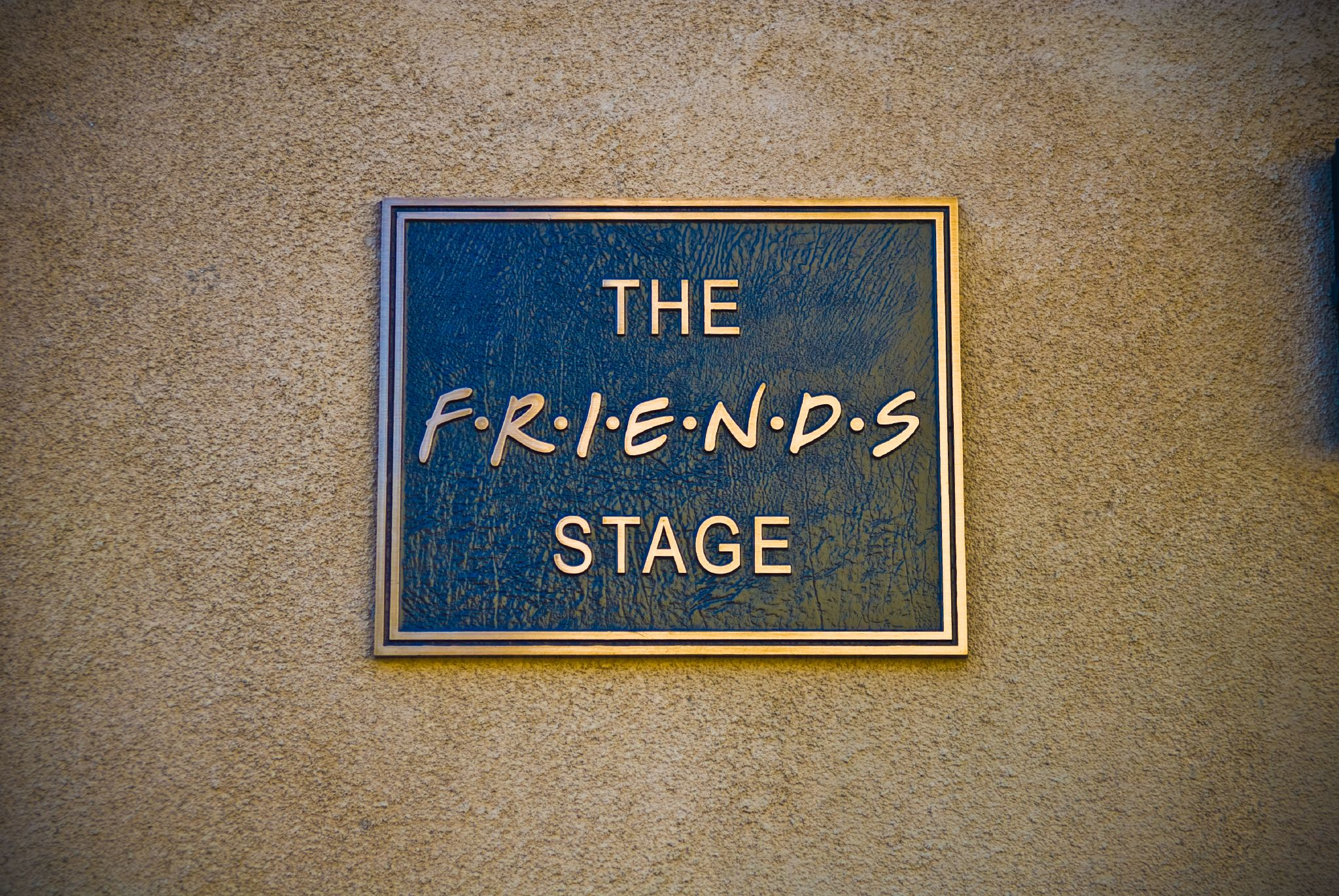
After filming on the finale concluded, Stage 24 at Warner Bros. Studios, where Friends had been filmed since season 2, was renamed "The Friends Stage".

The series's creators completed the first draft of the hour-long finale in January 2004, four months before its original airing. Crane, Kauffman and Bright watched the finales of other sitcoms to prepare the episode's outline, paying attention to what worked and what did not. They liked the ones that stayed true to the series, deeming "The Last Show", the finale of The Mary Tyler Moore Show to be the gold standard. Crane, Kauffman, and Bright had difficulty writing the finale. They did not want to do "something high concept, or take the show out of the show." The most critical parts of the finale were shot without an audience and with a minimum number of crew members. The main cast enjoyed the finale and were confident that the fans would react similarly:

It's exactly what I had hoped. We all end up with a sense of a new beginning and the audience has a sense that it's a new chapter in the lives of all these characters.

— David Schwimmer on the series finale.

NBC heavily promoted the series finale, which was preceded by weeks of media hype. Local NBC affiliates organized viewing parties around the U.S., including an event at Universal CityWalk featuring a special broadcast of the finale on an outdoor Astrovision screen. The finale was the subject of two episodes of Dateline NBC, one of which ran for two hours. A one-hour retrospective of clips from previous episodes was shown before the airing of the episode. Following the finale, The Tonight Show with Jay Leno was filmed on the set of the Friends' Central Perk coffee house, which featured the cast as guests. The advertising rates for the finale averaged $2 million for 30 seconds of commercial time, breaking the record held by the Seinfeld finale at $1.7 million.

In the U.S., 52.5 million viewers watched the finale on May 6, 2004, making it the most-watched entertainment telecast since the Seinfeld finale in 1998. The finale was the fifth most-watched series finale in television history, only behind the finales of M*A*S*H ("Goodbye, Farewell and Amen"), Cheers ("One for the Road"), The Fugitive ("The Judgment"), and Seinfeld, which were respectively watched by 105, 80.4, 78.0 and 76.3 million viewers. The retrospective episode was watched by fewer than 36 million viewers, and the finale was the second most-watched television broadcast of the year in the United States, only behind the Super Bowl. Following the finales of Friends and Frasier, media critics speculated about the fate of the sitcom genre. Opinions varied between a signalling of the end of the sitcom genre, a small decline in the large history of the genre, and a general reduction of scripted television in favor of reality shows.

== Reunion special ==
On November 12, 2019, The Hollywood Reporter announced that Warner Bros TV was developing a Friends reunion for HBO Max that would feature the whole cast and creators returning. On February 21, 2020, HBO confirmed that the unscripted reunion special, tentatively named "The One Where They Got Back Together", was set to be released in May the same year, along with the 236 original episodes of the series. On March 18, 2020, it was announced that the special, which was set to film on the Friends Stage on March 23 and 24, had been postponed indefinitely, due to the COVID-19 pandemic. In November 2020, Matthew Perry tweeted that the reunion is set to start filming in March 2021. On May 13, 2021, a teaser trailer was released officially announcing Friends: The Reunion also known as "The One Where They Get Back Together". The reunion special was released on HBO Max on May 27, 2021.

== Reception ==
=== Critical reception ===
Critical response of Friends
Season	Rotten Tomatoes	Metacritic
1	70% (43 reviews)	65% (24 reviews)
5	100% (6 reviews)	—N/a
6	100% (6 reviews)	—N/a
8	100% (7 reviews)	—N/a
9	20% (5 reviews)	—N/a
10	80% (25 reviews)	—N/a

Early reviews of the series were mixed; the first season holds a Metacritic score of 65 out of 100, based on 24 sampled reviews, indicating "generally favourable reviews". Tom Feran of The Plain Dealer wrote that the series traded "vaguely and less successfully on the hanging-out style of Seinfeld", while Ann Hodges of the Houston Chronicle called it "the new Seinfeld wannabe, but it will never be as funny as Seinfeld." In the Los Angeles Daily News, Ray Richmond named the series as "one of the brighter comedies of the new season", and the Los Angeles Times called it "flat-out the best comedy series of the new season."

The Chicago Sun-Times' Ginny Holbert found Joey and Rachel's characters to be underdeveloped, while Richmond commended the cast as a "likeable youth ensemble" with "good chemistry." Robert Bianco of USA Today was complimentary of Schwimmer, calling him "terrific." He also praised the female leads, but was concerned that Perry's role as Chandler was "undefined" and that LeBlanc was "relying too much on the same brain-dead stud routine that was already tired the last two times he tried it." The authors of Friends Like Us: The Unofficial Guide to Friends thought that the cast was "trying just a little too hard"; in particular, Perry and Schwimmer.

As the series progressed, reviews became more positive, and Friends became one of the most popular sitcoms of its time. It is now often ranked among the all-time best TV shows. Critics commended the series for having consistently sharp writing and for the chemistry between the main actors. Noel Holston of Newsday, who had dismissed the pilot as a "so-so Seinfeld wannabe" in 1994, repudiated his earlier review after re-watching the episode and felt like writing an apology to the writers. Heather Havrilesky of Salon.com thought that the series "hit its stride" in the second season. Havrilesky found the character-specific jokes and situations "could reliably make you laugh out loud a few times each episode", and the quality of writing allowed the stories to be "original and innovative."

Bill Carter of The New York Times called the eighth season a "truly stunning comeback." Carter found that by "generating new hot storylines and high-decibel laughs", the series made its way "back into the hearts of its fans." However, Liane Bonin of Entertainment Weekly felt that the direction of the ninth season was a "disappointing buzzkill", criticizing it for the non-stop celebrity guest spots and going into jump the shark territory. Although disappointed with the season, Bonin noted that "the writing [was] still sharp." Havrilesky thought that the tenth season was "alarmingly awful, far worse than you would ever imagine a show that was once so good could be." Friends was featured on Time's list of "The 100 Best TV Shows of All-Time", saying, "the well-hidden secret of this show was that it called itself Friends, and was really about family."

Reviews of the series finale were mostly positive. USA Today's Robert Bianco described the finale as entertaining and satisfying and praised it for deftly mixing emotion and humor while highlighting each of the stars. Sarah Rodman of the Boston Herald praised Aniston and Schwimmer for their acting, but felt that their characters' reunion was "a bit too neat, even if it was what most of the show's legions of fans wanted." Roger Catlin of the Hartford Courant felt that newcomers to the series would be "surprised at how laughless the affair could be, and how nearly every strained gag depends on the sheer stupidity of its characters." Ken Parish Perkins, writing for Fort Worth Star-Telegram, pointed out that the finale was "more touching than comical, more satisfying in terms of closure than knee-slappingly funny."

It may have been impossible for any one episode to live up to the hype and expectations built up around the Friends finale, but this hour probably came as close as fans could have reasonably hoped. Ultimately, the two-hour package did exactly what it was supposed to do. It wrapped up the story while reminding us why we liked the show and will miss it.

— Robert Bianco of USA Today on the series finale.

In a 2021 program on ITV, Mr. Bean writer Richard Curtis accused the Friends writers of stealing the joke which involved Joey getting a turkey stuck on his head in "The One with All the Thanksgivings" from the 1992 episode "Merry Christmas, Mr. Bean". In that episode, Mr. Bean (Rowan Atkinson) got a turkey stuck on his head after losing his watch while stuffing the turkey and put his head in to try to retrieve it. Rowan Atkinson, however, argued that jokes are meant to be stolen, or to inspire.

=== Awards ===
To maintain the series' ensemble format, the main cast members decided to enter themselves in the same acting categories for awards. Beginning with the eighth season, the actors decided to submit themselves in the lead actor balloting, rather than in the supporting actor fields. The series was nominated for 62 Primetime Emmy Awards, winning six.

Aniston and Kudrow are the only main cast members to win an Emmy, while Cox is the only actor not to be nominated. The series won the Primetime Emmy Award for Outstanding Comedy Series at the 54th Primetime Emmy Awards in 2002, receiving nominations in 1995, 1996, 1999, 2000, and 2003. The series also won an American Comedy Award, one GLAAD Media Award, one Golden Globe Award, three Logie Awards, six People's Choice Awards, one Satellite Award, and one Screen Actors Guild Award.

=== Ratings ===
The table below shows the ratings of Friends in the United States, where it consistently ranked within the top ten of the final television season ratings. "Rank" refers to how well Friends rated compared to other television series that aired during primetime hours of the corresponding television season. It is shown in relation to the total number of series airing on the then-six major English-language networks in a given season. "Viewers" refers to the average number of viewers for all original episodes, broadcast during the television season in the series' regular timeslot. The "season premiere" is the date that the first episode of the season aired, and the "season finale" is the date that the final episode of the season aired. Following the September 11 attacks, ratings increased 17% over the previous season.

Ratings table
Season	Timeslot	Season premiere	Season finale	TV season	Rank	Viewers (in millions)	Most-watched episode	
Season	Timeslot	Season premiere	Season finale	TV season	Rank	Viewers (in millions)	Title	Viewers (in millions)
1	Thursday 8:30 pm (1–16); Thursday 9:30 pm (17–24)	September 22, 1994	May 18, 1995	1994–95	8	24.3	"The One Where Rachel Finds Out"	31.3
2	Thursday 8:00 pm	September 21, 1995	May 16, 1996	1995–96	3	30	"The One After the Superbowl"	52.9
3	Thursday 8:00 pm	September 19, 1996	May 15, 1997	1996–97	4	24.9	"The One Where Chandler Can't Remember Which Sister"	29.80
4	Thursday 8:00 pm	September 25, 1997	May 7, 1998	1997–98	4	24.0	"The One with Ross's Wedding"	31.61
5	Thursday 8:00 pm	September 24, 1998	May 20, 1999	1998–99	2	23.5	"The One After Ross Says Rachel"	31.12
6	Thursday 8:00 pm	September 23, 1999	May 18, 2000	1999–2000	5	20.7	"The One with the Proposal"	30.73
7	Thursday 8:00 pm	October 12, 2000	May 17, 2001	2000–01	5	20.2	"The One with Monica and Chandler's Wedding"	30.05
8	Thursday 8:00 pm	September 27, 2001	May 16, 2002	2001–02	1	24.5	"The One Where Rachel Has a Baby"	34.91
9	Thursday 8:00 pm	September 26, 2002	May 15, 2003	2002–03	2	21.8	"The One Where No One Proposes"	34.01
10	Thursday 8:00 pm	September 25, 2003	May 6, 2004	2003–04	4	22.8	"The Last One"	52.46

=== Syndication ===
Because of syndication revenue, Friends continued to generate approximately $1 billion each year for Warner Bros as of 2015. It has been reported that Jennifer Aniston, Courteney Cox, Lisa Kudrow, Matt LeBlanc, Matthew Perry and David Schwimmer each receive about $20 million in annual residuals of syndication income for Friends, however that amount has been disputed.

All episodes became available on Netflix on January 1, 2015, introducing a new generation to the show. UK Friends reruns' ratings in 2015 increased by more than 10% annually. The 2016 reruns' US weekly audience, not including streaming, of 16 million would make it a hit on network television were the show still being produced. In the United States, the series has a syndication deal through multiple networks, including Nick at Nite, TBS, and Paramount Network. In July 2019, it was announced that from the beginning of 2020, Friends would not be available on Netflix in the United States and instead would be shown on Warner Bros. Discovery's video-streaming service HBO Max, which launched in May 2020.

== Legacy and cultural impact ==
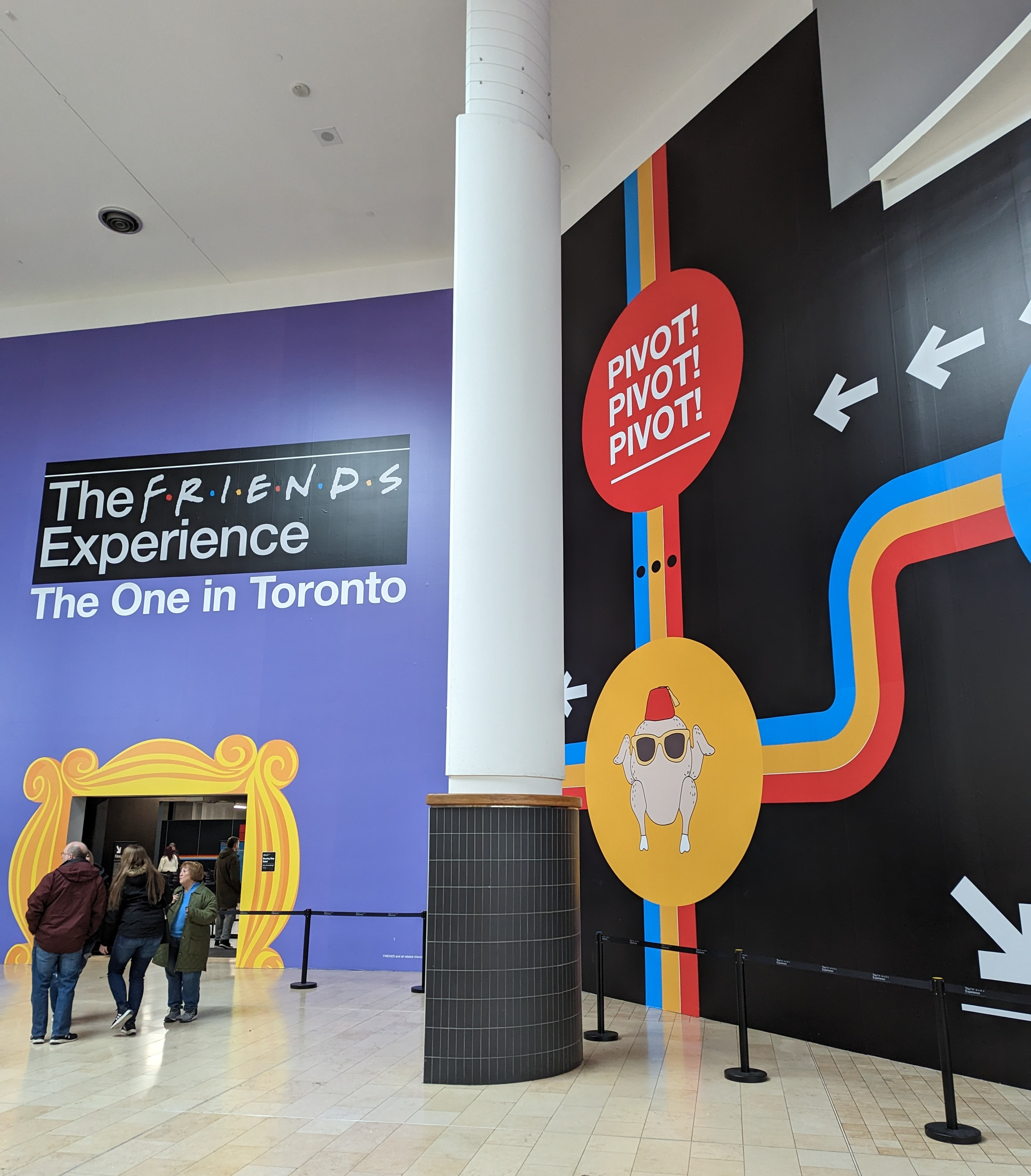
The Friends Experience exhibit at Yorkdale Shopping Centre in Toronto in 2022

Although the producers thought of Friends as "only a TV show", psychologists investigated the cultural impact of Friends during the series' run. Aniston's hairstyle was nicknamed "The Rachel" and copied around the world. Joey's catchphrase, "How you doin'?", became a popular part of Western English slang, often used as a pick-up line or when greeting friends. The series also influenced the English language, according to a study by the University of Toronto that found that the characters used the emphasized word "so" to modify adjectives more often than any other intensifier. Although the preference had already made its way into the American vernacular, usage on the series may have accelerated the change. Chandler's habit of ending a sentence unfinished for sarcasm also influenced viewers' speech. The show's availability on streaming television—it accounted for 4% of all Netflix views in 2018—gave it a large new Gen Z audience. Kauffman reported that her high school daughter's friends thought that Friends was a new period piece about the 1990s. One young fan described the show as "aspirational ... [kids hope] that when they're that age ... they'll have those friends".

Friends has been credited in helping non-English speaking students to learn the language. A 2012 poll by Kaplan International English Colleges found that more than a quarter (26%) of its students cited the sitcom as the best show for helping them improve their English. Notable individuals who have also said that the sitcom helped them learn English include Liverpool Football Club manager Jürgen Klopp, South Korean band BTS member RM, and Belgian professional golfer Thomas Pieters.

Friends developed an alternative family lifestyle by representing young people who live unconventional domestic lives. It presented the idea that "all you need are good friends" and that you can construct families through choice. The audience was able to identify with the program through the troubles seen on weekly episodes. It portrayed a new way of living life and developing relationships which were not normally seen in conventional society. According to a pop-culture expert at the University at Buffalo, Friends is "one of those rare shows that marked a change in American culture." The images of youth and the roles they portray are better defined and represent a lifestyle that centers around creating and sustaining relationships between friends running their own lives and seeking help from each other.

Vox stated that Friends had an impact on the creation of other conflictless "hangout sitcoms", with groups of adult friends who are funny and have similar character traits. One example of this is How I Met Your Mother, which The Guardian's TV and radio blog noted also shares its setting (Manhattan) with Friends. Other examples include The Big Bang Theory, New Girl, and Happy Endings.

Readers of TV Guide voted the cast of Friends their Best Comedy cast of all time, ranking at 29% of the votes, beating Seinfeld, which registered 18%. A poll undertaken by 60 Minutes and Vanity Fair named Friends the third-greatest sitcom of all time. In 2014, the series was ranked by Mundo Estranho the Best TV Series of All Time. A 2015 survey by The Hollywood Reporter of 2,800 actors, producers, directors, and other industry people named Friends as their No. 1 favorite show.

The episode "The One with the Holiday Armadillo" has been cited as a notable representation of Hanukkah and Jewish interfaith celebration on television.

Friends was parodied in the twelfth season Murder, She Wrote episode "Murder Among Friends". In the episode, amateur sleuth Jessica Fletcher (Angela Lansbury) investigates the murder of Ricki Vardian (Cindy Katz) a producer for Buds, a fictional television series about the daily lives of a group of city friends. The episode was devised after CBS moved Murder, She Wrote from its regular Sunday night timeslot to a Thursday night timeslot directly opposite Friends on NBC; Angela Lansbury was quoted by Bruce Lansbury, her brother, and Murder, She Wrote's supervising producer, as having "a bit of an attitude" about the move to Thursday, but he saw the plot as "a friendly setup, no mean-spiritedness." Jerry Ludwig, the writer of the episode, researched the "flavor" of Buds by watching episodes of Friends.

Producers of Married... with Children attempted to create a spinoff series called Enemies, which was intended to act as an antithesis to Friends the same way Married... with Children had been an antithesis to family sitcoms such as The Cosby Show. However, the Fox network declined to pick up the series.

=== Coffee house ===
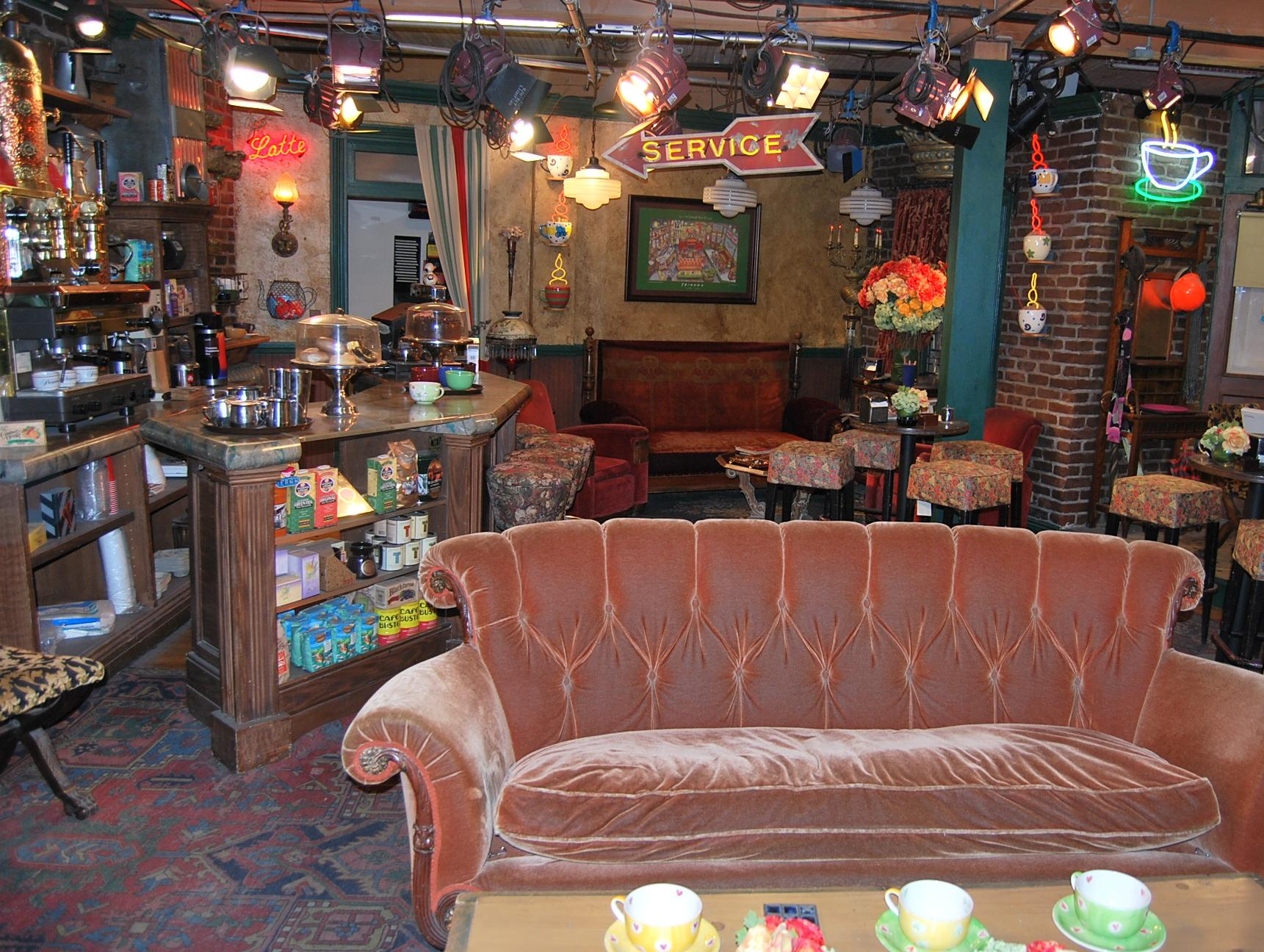
The set of Central Perk at Warner Bros. Studios

The Central Perk coffee house, one of the principal settings of the series, is part of the Warner Bros. Studio Tour Hollywood. People sometimes propose marriage on the couch, and many tourists cry when they sit on it. The coffee house has inspired various imitations worldwide. In 2006, Iranian businessman Mojtaba Asadian started a Central Perk franchise, registering the name in 32 countries. The decor of the coffee houses is inspired by Friends, featuring replica couches, counters, neon signage and bricks. The coffee houses contain paintings of the various characters from the series, and televisions playing Friends episodes. James Michael Tyler, who played Gunther, the Central Perk manager in the series, attended the grand opening of the Dubai café, where he worked as a waiter.

Central Perk was rebuilt as part of a museum exhibit at Warner Bros. Studios and was shown on The Ellen DeGeneres Show in October 2008 when Jennifer Aniston visited the set for the first time since the series finale in 2004. From September 24 to October 7, 2009, a Central Perk replica was on Broadwick Street, Soho, London. The coffee house sold coffee to customers and featured a display of Friends memorabilia and props, such as the Geller Cup from the season three episode "The One with the Football". In Beijing, business owner Du Xin opened a coffee shop named Central Perk in March 2010.

In India, there are six Friends-themed cafes which feature many icons from the original TV series, including Chandler and Joey's ugly dog statue, the orange sofa, the purple door of Monica and Rachel's apartment, and Phoebe's pink bicycle. One named Central Perk is in Chandigarh, Kolkata; one named F.R.I.E.N.D.S. Cafe in West Bengal, and the others are in Delhi, Gurgaon; Bhubaneswar, Odisha; and Pune, Maharashtra.

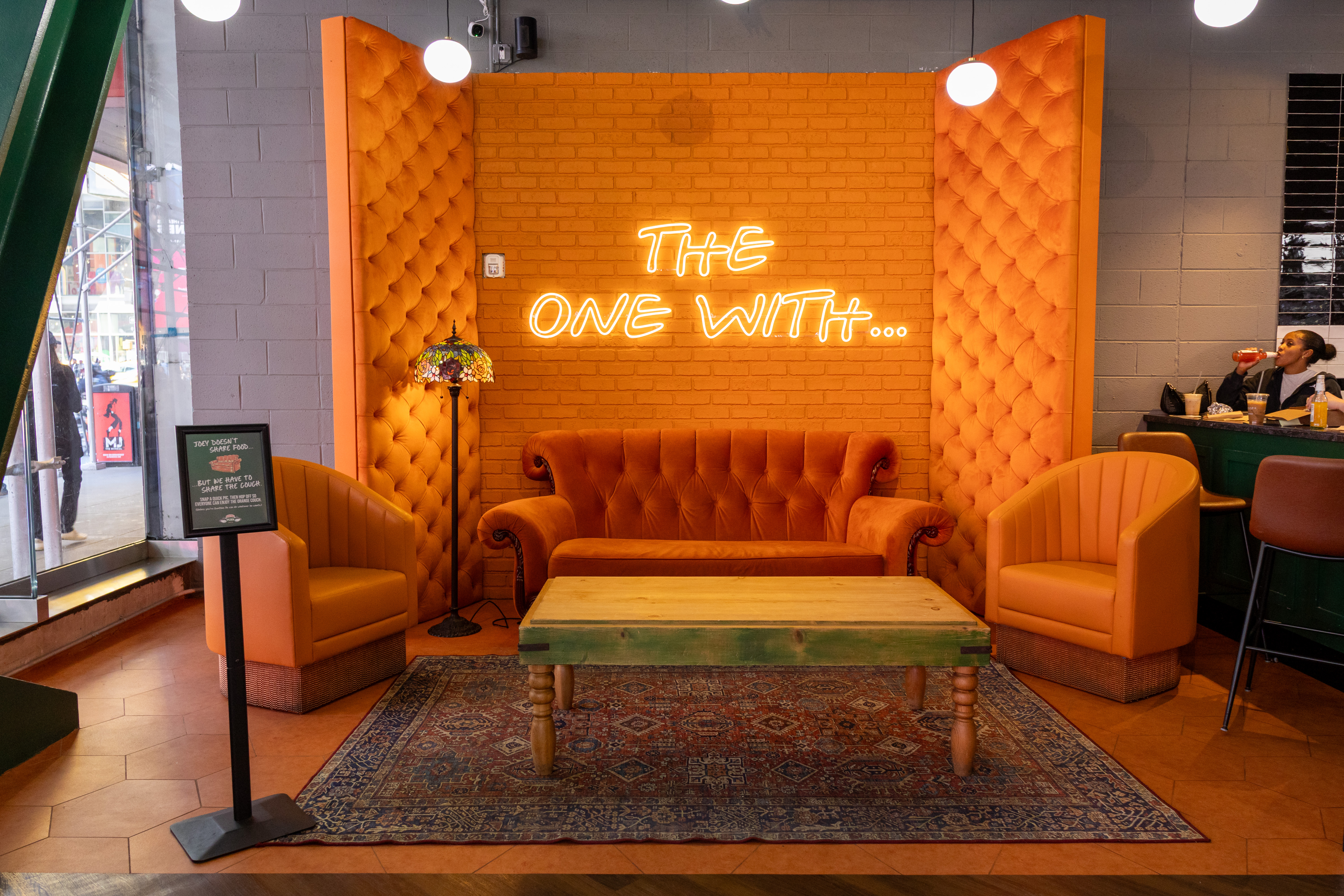
A replica of the famed orange sofa from Central Perk at the Times Square Central Perk coffee shop in May 2026.

In 2016, a Central Perk replica was opened in Outram, Singapore. It is the only Central Perk replica outside of the United States that has been given intellectual property rights by Warner Bros. The café includes feature walls, replicating the walls of the main characters' apartments and memorabilia and props used on the show.

In August 2019, Lego launched a Central Perk Lego set to mark the show's 25th anniversary. In September 2025, Central Perk Coffeehouse and Warner Bros. Discovery announced that a Central Perk coffee shop will be open in Time Square in late fall 2025, with the opening taking place on December 12.

== Distribution ==
=== Broadcast ===
After the produced pilot lived up to NBC's hopes, the series premiered with the name Friends on September 22, 1994, in the coveted Thursday 8:30 p.m. time slot. The pilot aired between Mad About You and Seinfeld, and was watched by almost 22 million American viewers. The series was a huge success throughout its run and was a staple of NBC's Thursday night line-up, dubbed by the network as Must See TV.

Having already made huge success in the United States, Friends producers decided to air the show in Europe. It premiered in the United Kingdom on April 28, 1995. Season 1 was broadcast until September 1995 on Channel 4 at 9:30 pm on Friday nights, and immediately was a success. The popularity of the show led its theme song, "I'll Be There for You" by the Rembrandts, to hit number 3 on the UK Singles Charts in September 1995.

When Crane told reporters in 2001 that the ninth season was a possibility, critics believed that he was posturing and that at least two of the cast members would not sign on for another season. When it was confirmed that Friends would return for a ninth season, the news was mainly about the amount of money—$7 million per episode—that it took to bring the series back for another season. After year-long expectations that the ninth season would be the series' last, NBC signed a deal in late December 2002 to bring the series back for a final tenth season. The series' creative team did not want to extend negotiations into the next year and wanted to start writing the rest of the ninth-season episodes and a potential series finale. NBC agreed to pay $10 million to Warner Bros. for the production of each tenth-season episode, the highest price in television history for a 30-minute series. Although NBC was unable to bring in enough advertising revenue from commercials to cover the costs, the series was integral to the Thursday night schedule, which brought high ratings and profits to the other television series. The cast demanded that the tenth season be reduced from the usual 24 episodes to 18 episodes to allow them to work on outside projects.

In the 1990s, while Friends was still running on NBC, many free local broadcast networks throughout the US bought the syndication rights to broadcast rerun episodes lasting well into the 2000s even after the series officially ended on NBC, however by the 2010s this was discontinued. Since then, rerun episodes of the series have been exclusively available only on paid entertainment services such as American cable TV or paid streaming services. Reruns of the series currently are not available on any FAST streaming platforms or free broadcast networks.

In fall 2001, Warner Bros. Domestic Cable made a deal with sister network TBS (both were owned by Time Warner) to air the series in rerun syndication. Warner Bros. Domestic Cable announced that it had sold additional cable rights to Friends to Nick at Nite which began airing in the fall of 2011 (unlike the TBS and broadcast syndication airings, Nick at Nite broadcasts of the series, which began airing as part of a seven-night launch marathon on September 5, 2011, replace the end credit tag scenes with marginalized credits featuring promotions for the series and other Nick at Nite programs). Warner Bros. was expected to make $200 million in license fees and advertising from the deal. Nick at Nite paid $500,000 per episode to air the episodes after 6 pm. ET for six years through fall 2017. In syndication until 2005, Friends had earned $4 million per episode in cash license fees for a total of $944 million.

=== Remaster ===
Beginning in March 2012, high-definition versions of all 236 Friends episodes were made available to local broadcast stations, starting with the pilot episode. For the remastered episodes, Warner Bros. restored previously cropped images on the left and right sides of the screen, using the original 35 mm film source, to use the entire 16:9 widescreen frame. Because the show was not originally filmed for widescreen, but rather filmed in 4-perf format and protected for 4:3, some cropping problems arise in some shots where information from the top and bottom of the frame is removed, and some expanded shots reveal unintentional artifacts, including set edges, boom mics and body doubles replacing some of the main cast.

In early versions of the HD remasters, there were also a few shots, including chroma effects shots, which were sourced from standard-definition videotape sources, as not all of the footage had been located in time for the remaster. The original film sources for these shots were later rescanned for later broadcast and release. These masters had been airing in New Zealand on TV2 since January 2011, and the earlier HD prints continue to air on Comedy Central in the United Kingdom as of 2020. Netflix added all ten seasons of Friends in high definition to its streaming service in the United States in January 2015 before the platform discontinued the series in late 2019.

=== Home media ===
All ten seasons have been released on DVD individually and as a box set. Each Region 1 season release contains special features and are presented in their aforementioned original international broadcast versions, although Region 2 releases are as originally aired domestically. For the first season, each episode is updated with color correction and sound enhancement. A wide range of Friends merchandise has been produced by various companies. In September 1995, WEA Records released the first album of music from Friends, the Friends Original TV Soundtrack, containing music featured in previous and future episodes. The soundtrack debuted on the Billboard 200 at number 46, and sold 500,000 copies in November 1995.

In 1999, a second soundtrack album entitled Friends Again was released. Other merchandise includes a Friends version of the DVD game Scene It?, and a quiz video game for PlayStation 2 and PC entitled Friends: The One with All the Trivia. On September 28, 2009, a box set was released in the UK celebrating the show's 15th anniversary. The box set contained extended episodes, an episode guide, and original special features.

Warner Home Video released a complete series collection on Blu-ray on November 13, 2012. In September 2024, the entire series was released on Ultra HD Blu-ray in celebration of the 30th anniversary of the show.

== Spin-off ==
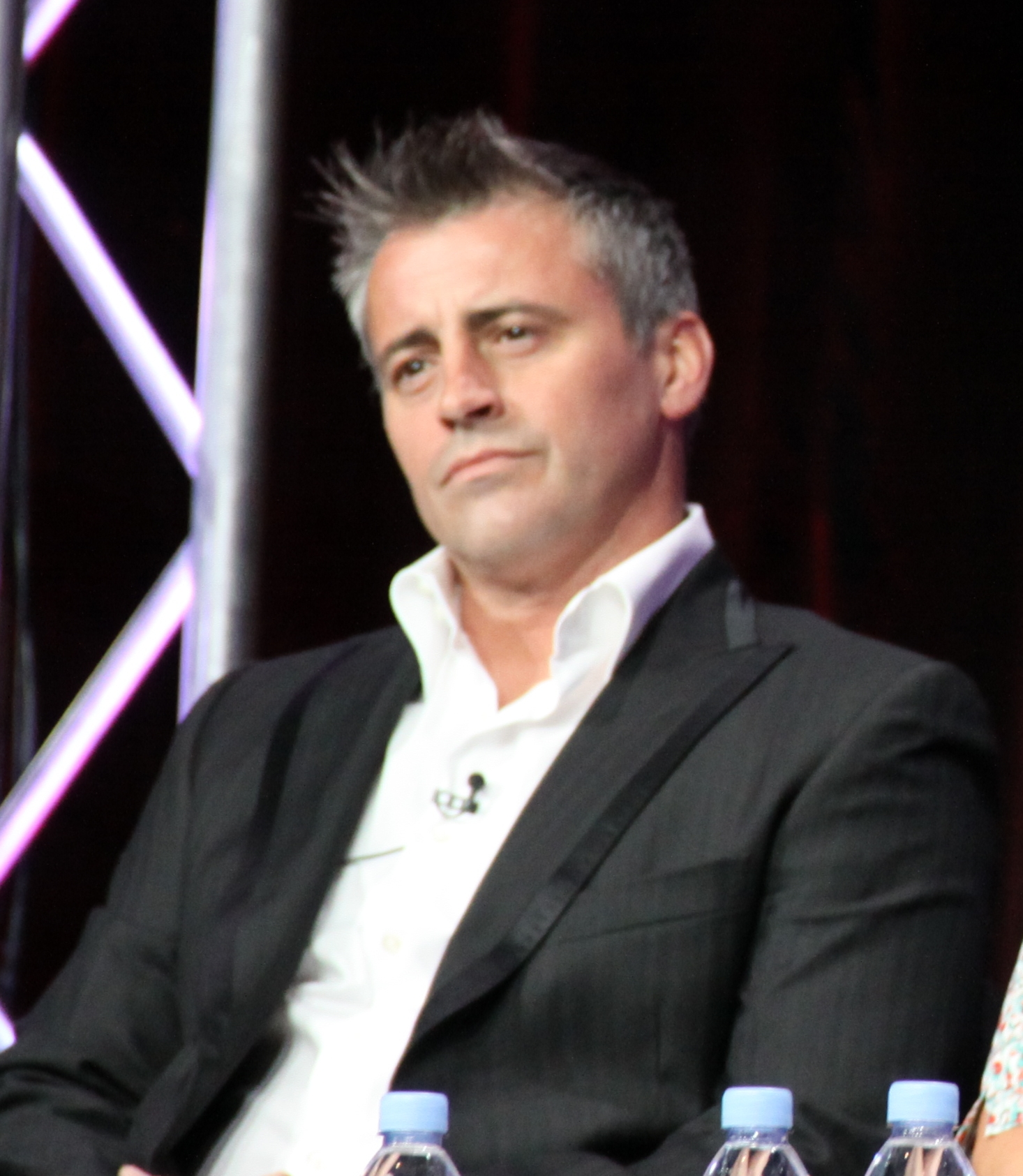
LeBlanc hoped that by having his own show, Joey, "probably the least evolved character" on Friends would become more developed.

After the series finale in 2004, LeBlanc signed on for the spin-off series, Joey, following Joey's move to Los Angeles to pursue his acting career. Kauffman and Crane were not interested in the spin-off, although Bright agreed to executive produce the series with Scott Silveri and Shana Goldberg-Meehan. NBC heavily promoted Joey and gave it Friends' Thursday 8:00 pm timeslot.

The pilot was watched by 18.6 million American viewers, but ratings continually decreased throughout the series's two seasons, averaging 10.2 million viewers in the first season and 7.1 million in the second. The final broadcast episode on March 7, 2006, was watched by 7.09 million viewers; NBC cancelled the series on May 15, 2006, after two seasons, leaving eight episodes unaired. Bright blamed the collaboration between NBC executives, the studio and other producers for quickly ruining the series:

On Friends, Joey was a womanizer, but we enjoyed his exploits. He was a solid friend, a guy you knew you could count on. Joey was deconstructed to be a guy who couldn't get a job, couldn't ask a girl out. He became a pathetic, mopey character. I felt he was moving in the wrong direction, but I was not heard.

— Kevin S. Bright on the reason for Joey's cancellation.

== See also ==
- Hello Friends (TV series)
- The Friends Experience
- Music of Friends
