= Top-rated United States television programs of 2000–01 =

This table displays the top-rated primetime television series of the 2000–01 season as measured by Nielsen Media Research.

| Rank | Program | Network | Rating |
|---|---|---|---|
| 1 | Survivor | CBS | 17.4 |
| 2 | ER | NBC | 15.0 |
| 3 | Who Wants to Be a Millionaire — Wednesday | ABC | 13.7 |
| 4 | Who Wants to Be a Millionaire — Tuesday | ABC | 13.0 |
| 5 | Friends | NBC | 12.6 |
| 5 | Monday Night Football | ABC | 12.6 |
| 5 | Everybody Loves Raymond | CBS | 12.6 |
| 8 | Who Wants to Be a Millionaire — Sunday | ABC | 12.4 |
| 9 | Law & Order | NBC | 12.3 |
| 10 | The Practice | ABC | 11.7 |
| 11 | Who Wants to Be a Millionaire — Thursday | ABC | 11.6 |
| 11 | CSI: Crime Scene Investigation | CBS | 11.6 |
| 11 | The West Wing | NBC | 11.6 |
| 14 | Will & Grace | NBC | 11.3 |
| 15 | 60 Minutes | CBS | 11.1 |
| 16 | Becker | CBS | 10.9 |
| 17 | Temptation Island | FOX | 10.7 |
| 17 | Frasier | NBC | 10.7 |
| 19 | Who Wants to Be a Millionaire — Friday | ABC | 10.5 |
| 20 | Just Shoot Me! | NBC | 10.4 |
| 21 | Judging Amy | CBS | 9.9 |
| 22 | Cursed/The Weber Show | NBC | 9.7 |
| 22 | NYPD Blue | ABC | 9.7 |
| 22 | Touched by an Angel | CBS | 9.7 |
| 25 | Law & Order: Special Victims Unit | NBC | 9.6 |
| 26 | JAG | CBS | 9.2 |
| 27 | The King of Queens | CBS | 8.9 |
| 28 | Yes, Dear | CBS | 8.7 |
| 29 | Family Law | CBS | 8.6 |
| 29 | The District | CBS | 8.6 |
| 29 | CBS Sunday Movie | CBS | 8.6 |
