= Top-rated United States television programs of 1999–2000 =

This table displays the top-rated primetime television series of the 1999–2000 season as measured by Nielsen Media Research.

Rank	Program	Network	Rating
1	Who Wants to Be a Millionaire — Tuesday	ABC	18.6
2	Who Wants to Be a Millionaire — Thursday	ABC	17.5
3	Who Wants to Be a Millionaire — Sunday	ABC	17.1
4	ER	NBC	16.9
5	Friends	NBC	14.0
6	Frasier	NBC	13.6
7	Monday Night Football	ABC	13.5
8	60 Minutes	CBS	12.0
9	The Practice	ABC	11.8
10	Touched by an Angel	CBS	11.6
11	Law & Order	NBC	11.5
12	Everybody Loves Raymond	CBS	11.4
13	Jesse	NBC	11.3
14	CBS Sunday Movie	CBS	10.9
15	Stark Raving Mad	NBC	10.7
15	NYPD Blue	ABC	10.7
17	Dharma & Greg	ABC	10.5
18	Becker	CBS	10.4
19	Judging Amy	CBS	10.2
20	JAG	CBS	9.7
21	The Drew Carey Show	ABC	9.5
22	Providence	NBC	9.4
23	60 Minutes II	CBS	9.3
24	The West Wing	NBC	9.1
24	ABC Monday Movie	ABC	9.1
24	Spin City	ABC	9.1
27	Family Law	CBS	9.0
28	Dateline NBC — Friday	NBC	8.9
28	Malcolm in the Middle	FOX	8.9
30	Law & Order: Special Victims Unit	NBC	8.8
30	CBS Wednesday Movie	CBS	8.8
