= Top-rated United States television programs of 2003–04 =

This table displays the top-rated primetime television series of the 2003–04 season as measured by Nielsen Media Research.

| Rank | Program | Network | Rating |
|---|---|---|---|
| 1 | CSI: Crime Scene Investigation | CBS | 15.9 |
| 2 | American Idol — Tuesday | FOX | 14.9 |
| 3 | American Idol — Wednesday | FOX | 14.1 |
| 4 | Friends | NBC | 13.6 |
| 5 | The Apprentice | NBC | 13.0 |
| 6 | ER | NBC | 12.9 |
| 7 | Survivor | CBS | 12.3 |
| 8 | CSI: Miami | CBS | 11.9 |
| 9 | Monday Night Football | ABC | 11.2 |
| 9 | Everybody Loves Raymond | CBS | 11.2 |
| 11 | Without a Trace | CBS | 11.1 |
| 12 | Law & Order | NBC | 10.8 |
| 13 | Will & Grace | NBC | 10.4 |
| 14 | My Big Fat Obnoxious Fiance | FOX | 9.9 |
| 14 | Two and a Half Men | CBS | 9.9 |
| 16 | 60 Minutes | CBS | 9.4 |
| 17 | Cold Case | CBS | 9.3 |
| 18 | Law & Order: Special Victims Unit | NBC | 8.7 |
| 19 | Crossing Jordan | NBC | 8.6 |
| 19 | Law & Order: Criminal Intent | NBC | 8.6 |
| 21 | The Bachelor/The Bachelorette | ABC | 8.3 |
| 22 | Fear Factor | NBC | 7.9 |
| 23 | The West Wing | NBC | 7.8 |
| 23 | CBS Sunday Movie | CBS | 7.8 |
| 23 | Navy: NCIS | CBS | 7.8 |
| 26 | Judging Amy | CBS | 7.7 |
| 26 | Still Standing | CBS | 7.7 |
| 28 | Las Vegas | NBC | 7.6 |
| 29 | Average Joe | NBC | 7.4 |
| 30 | Frasier | NBC | 7.3 |
| 30 | The King of Queens | CBS | 7.3 |
