= Top-rated United States television programs of 2004–05 =

This table displays the top-rated primetime television series of the 2004–05 season as measured by Nielsen Media Research.

Rank	Program	Network	Rating
1	CSI: Crime Scene Investigation	CBS	16.5
2	American Idol — Tuesday	FOX	15.7
3	American Idol — Wednesday	FOX	15.3
4	Desperate Housewives	ABC	14.5
5	CSI: Miami	CBS	12.4
6	Without a Trace	CBS	12.3
7	Survivor	CBS	12.0
8	Grey's Anatomy	ABC	11.6
9	Everybody Loves Raymond	CBS	11.2
10	Monday Night Football	ABC	10.8
11	Two and a Half Men	CBS	10.6
12	ER	NBC	10.4
13	Lost	ABC	9.8
14	Cold Case	CBS	9.7
14	The Apprentice	NBC	9.7
16	Law & Order: Special Victims Unit	NBC	9.2
16	60 Minutes	CBS	9.2
18	Extreme Makeover: Home Edition	ABC	9.1
18	Medium	NBC	9.1
20	Law & Order	NBC	8.9
20	CSI: NY	CBS	8.9
22	NCIS	CBS	8.8
23	House	FOX	8.3
24	Boston Legal	ABC	8.1
25	Law & Order: Criminal Intent	NBC	7.9
26	Crossing Jordan	NBC	7.7
27	CBS Sunday Movie	CBS	7.6
27	The Amazing Race	CBS	7.6
29	Judging Amy	CBS	7.4
29	The West Wing	NBC	7.4
