= Top-rated United States television programs of 2001–02 =

This table displays the top-rated primetime television series of the 2001–02 season as measured by Nielsen Media Research.

Rank	Program	Network	Rating
1	Friends	NBC	15.0
2	CSI: Crime Scene Investigation	CBS	14.5
3	ER	NBC	14.2
4	Everybody Loves Raymond	CBS	12.8
5	Law & Order	NBC	12.6
6	Survivor	CBS	11.8
7	Monday Night Football	ABC	11.5
8	The West Wing	NBC	11.4
9	Will & Grace	NBC	11.0
9	Leap of Faith	NBC	11.0
11	Becker	CBS	10.7
12	Law & Order: Special Victims Unit	NBC	10.4
13	60 Minutes	CBS	10.1
14	Frasier	NBC	9.9
14	JAG	CBS	9.9
16	Inside Schwartz	NBC	9.8
16	Judging Amy	CBS	9.8
18	Just Shoot Me!	NBC	9.3
19	The King of Queens	CBS	8.9
20	Yes, Dear	CBS	8.8
20	Crossing Jordan	NBC	8.8
22	The Guardian	CBS	8.4
23	The Practice	ABC	8.3
23	NYPD Blue	ABC	8.3
25	Baby Bob	CBS	8.1
25	Dateline NBC — Friday	NBC	8.1
27	Fear Factor	NBC	7.9
27	Law & Order: Criminal Intent	NBC	7.9
27	Providence	NBC	7.9
30	60 Minutes II	CBS	7.7
30	Family Law	CBS	7.7
