= Top-rated United States television programs of 2002–03 =

This table displays the top-rated primetime television series of the 2002–03 season as measured by Nielsen Media Research.

Rank	Program	Network	Rating
1	CSI: Crime Scene Investigation	CBS	16.3
2	Friends	NBC	13.9
3	Joe Millionaire	FOX	13.3
4	ER	NBC	13.1
5	American Idol — Tuesday	FOX	12.6
6	American Idol — Wednesday	FOX	12.5
7	Survivor (Thailand & Amazon)	CBS	11.9
7	Everybody Loves Raymond	CBS	11.9
9	Law & Order	NBC	11.7
10	Monday Night Football	ABC	11.4
11	CSI: Miami	CBS	11.0
11	Will & Grace	NBC	11.0
13	Scrubs	NBC	10.3
14	Law & Order: Special Victims Unit	NBC	10.1
15	Without a Trace	CBS	10.0
16	The Bachelor/The Bachelorette	ABC	9.9
17	60 Minutes	CBS	9.6
18	Judging Amy	CBS	9.5
19	Law & Order: Criminal Intent	NBC	9.4
19	Still Standing	CBS	9.4
21	The West Wing	NBC	9.0
22	JAG	CBS	8.9
23	Good Morning, Miami	NBC	8.7
24	Yes, Dear	CBS	8.6
25	The King of Queens	CBS	8.5
26	Frasier	NBC	8.4
27	The Guardian	CBS	8.3
28	My Big Fat Greek Life	CBS	8.0
29	NYPD Blue	ABC	7.8
30	Fear Factor	NBC	7.7
