= The Friends Experience =

Exhibit about the American television series Friends

New York City
- Opening date: March 17, 2021

Las Vegas
- Opening date: July 23, 2025

The Friends Experience is an exhibit about the American television series Friends.

== Description and history ==
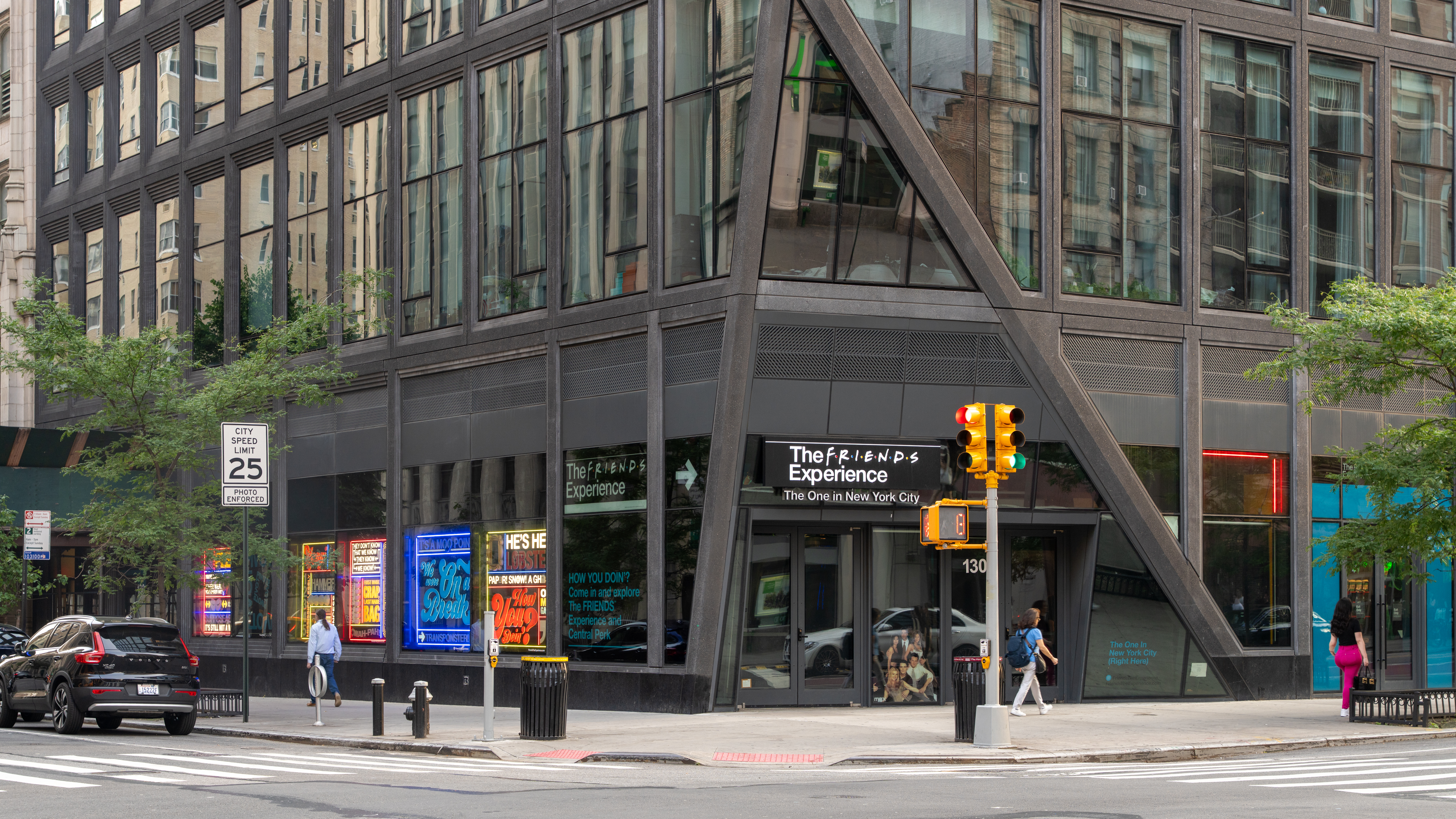
In NYC (2025)

Described as "immersive" and "interactive", the exhibit by Original X Productions features costumes, props, and sets from the show. It began as a pop-up in New York City, before finding a permanent location and being replicated as a touring exhibit. The Friends Experience has been described as a pop-up museum. The exhibit also has a gift shop with souvenirs.

=== Locations ===
The Friends Experience has both permanent locations and temporary pop-up locations. Locations names follow the same naming convention as Friends episodes.

==== The One in New York City ====
Warner Bros. Entertainment and Superfly opened a pop-up location in New York City in 2019 to celebrate the 25th anniversary of the premier of Friends. The pop-up location operated from September 7 to October 6, 2019.

Following the pop-up location, a new, permanent location was opened on March 17, 2021. In addition to replicas of sets from the show, this new location included a working Central Perk Cafe.

==== The One in Vegas ====
A permanent location was opened in Las Vegas on July 23, 2025, at the MGM Grand Las Vegas.

==== Pop-up Locations ====
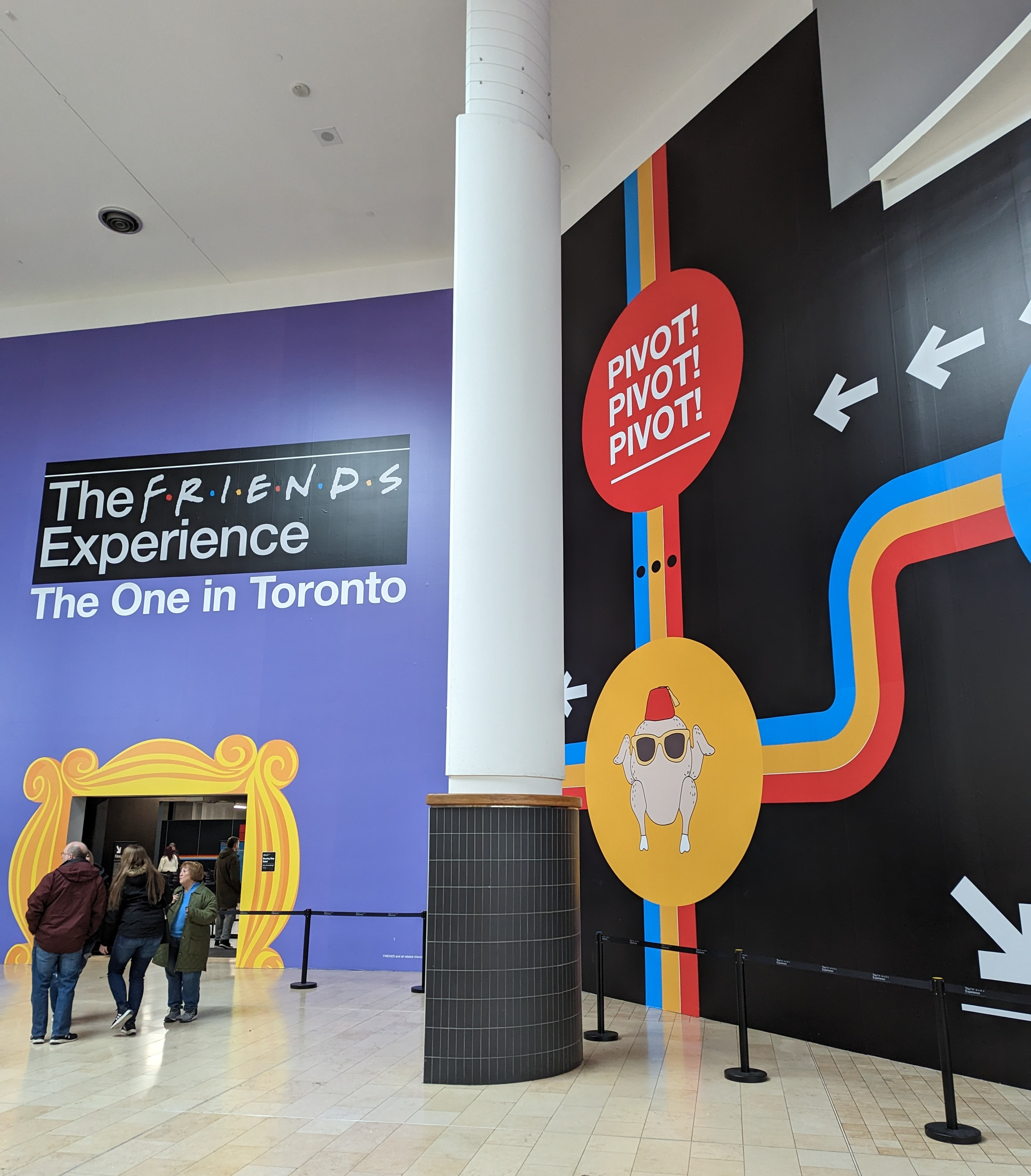
The Friends Experience in Toronto, Canada (2022)

List of Pop-up Locations
Name	Location	Operating Dates
	The Shops at Willow Bend in Plano, Texas	November 4, 2021 to January 15, 2022
The One in Toronto	Toronto	2022
	San Francisco	October 13, 2022 to December 4, 2022.
The One in Seattle	Pacific Place (Seattle)	December 9, 2022 to April 30, 2023.
The One Near Philadelphia	King of Prussia	2023. Closed May 29, 2023.
The One in London	London	August 2024 to January 4, 2025
The One in Manila	Manila	October 8, 2025 to November 30, 2025
