= Liane Bonin =

American journalist

Liane Bonin is an American journalist, author, radio producer, and produced screenwriter. She has written articles that appeared in Entertainment Weekly, The Los Angeles Times, Mademoiselle, Daily Variety, People, Teen People, The Hollywood Reporter, Maxim and others.

Bonin graduated with a degree in filmic writing. Her young adult novel series Fame Unlimited was bought by NAL/Jam, a division of Penguin, for publication in 2007. The first Fame Unlimited book, Celebrity Skin, was due for publication on February 7. The sequels, Pretty on the Outside and Idol Talk, were released later in the year.

Bonin was a senior reporter at SW Networks, an entertainment news feed to Los Angeles and as a producer for public radio, her work has been broadcast on "Weekend America," KCRW, BBC Radio, Seattle's KUOW-FM, and transom.org. Her script Dante's View was the first-place winner of the Writer's Digest Screenplay Contest, and was later independently produced starring Guinevere Turner, Sheryl Lee and Brett Harrelson. She co-wrote the feature screenplay Plastic Jesus, which was a finalist in the Los Angeles Film Collaborative grant program.

She lives with her husband and three dogs in the Los Angeles area.
