= NBC Sunday Night Movie =

- Country of origin: United States
- Original language: English

Production
- Running time: 120–240 mins. (approx.)

Original release
- Network: NBC
- Release: 1981 – 2009

The NBC Sunday Night Movie was a weekly film block which ran on NBC on Sunday nights from 9 to 11 pm or 8:30 pm until 11 pm. Often for miniseries programming, it would air the first night of the series, with the second night as part of the NBC Monday Night Movie.

The last film to air was Friday Night Lights on September 6, 2009 with 2.6 million viewers. During the mid-1980s the Sunday Night Movie was aired consistently enough to be ranked in the top 30 highest-rated programs for 1985–1988.

== "The Big Event" ==
On September 20, 1976, NBC re-purposed the Sunday Night Movie as an umbrella program called The Big Event. Although much of the Big Event's run featured film premieres, made-for-TV movies and installments of miniseries, some were specials and sporting events. The New York Times, however, panned the opening telecast: "Sunday evening's live presentation of “The Big Event,” a new weekly series of what the network hopes will be “superspecial” attractions, was structured around three New York parties, and parts of the festivities were scheduled to be performed outdoors. The elaborate plans, however, ran into frequent periods of rain, and the generally soggy gloom permeated most of the indoor routines, turning an already awkward format into an excruciatingly embarrassing, almost pathetic occasion."

In the initial 1976–77 season, the show finished with a 24.4 rating, good enough for sixth in the ratings—making it one of only four NBC programs to place in the Top 30. However, interest waned in subsequent seasons, and the network finally dropped the Big Event branding in 1981.
