= CBS Sunday Movie =

Film broadcast series by CBS

The CBS Sunday Movie (also known at various times as the CBS Sunday Night Movie) is the umbrella title for a made-for-TV and feature film showcase series originally airing from 1941 on CBS until the end of the 2005–2006 television season, when it was replaced with a drama series. It was the last of the weekly Sunday night movie showcases aired by the Big Three television networks to be canceled, outside of special event premieres and the network's previous run of the Hallmark Hall of Fame film anthology.

On April 7, 2020, as part of schedule changes associated with the impact of the COVID-19 pandemic on television in the United States, CBS announced that it would air feature films under the CBS Sunday Night Movies banner for a five-week event in May 2020, featuring films from corporate sister Paramount Pictures (as well as other studios for example Sony Pictures, Warner Bros. Pictures, Walt Disney Studios, Lionsgate, Metro-Goldwyn-Mayer, Samuel Goldwyn Films and Universal Pictures. A sixth week was added to the event to fill the timeslot of the postponed 74th Tony Awards, featuring a sing-along version of Grease.

In September 2020, CBS announced that the block would return for six additional weeks beginning in October, filling the network's Sunday-night schedule to allow time for its Sunday-night dramas (The Equalizer, NCIS: Los Angeles, and NCIS: New Orleans) to resume production.

== Titles ==
This is a listing of topics pertaining to CBS movies broadcast on television under various umbrella titles.

- Film Theatre of the Air (1941–42, & 1949, Saturday; 1951 and 1953, Tuesday)
- Premiere Playhouse (March–July 1949, Friday; 1949–50, Saturday)
- Budweiser Summer Theatre (1951, Saturday)
- Schlitz Film Firsts (1951, Friday)
- Summer Cinema (1952, Saturday)
- The CBS Thursday Night Movies (1965–75)
- The CBS Friday Night Movies (1966–77)
- The New CBS Tuesday Night Movies (1972–74)
- The CBS Wednesday Night Movies (1977–81)
- The CBS Tuesday Night Movies (1978–86)
- The CBS Saturday Night Movies (1981–86)
- CBS Sunday Movie (1986–2006)
- CBS Tuesday Movie (1986–2000)
- CBS Wednesday Movie (1986–2000)
- The CBS Late Movie (1972–89)
- A CBS Special Movie Presentation (1974–2006)
- CBS Sunday Night Movies (2020–present)

== Schedules ==
This list may be incomplete

=== 1971 ===
| Date | Movie |
|---|---|
| June 13 | Cutter's Trail |
| June 20 | The Wrong Box |
| June 27 | Once a Thief |
| July 4 | A Step Out Of Line |
| July 11 | Judith |
| July 18 | Jack of Diamonds |
| July 25 | Tarzan and the Great River |
| September 19 | Guess Who's Coming to Dinner |
| September 26 | Bandolero! |
| October 3 | To Sir, with Love |
| October 10 | The Sand Pebbles Part 1 |
| October 17 | The Sand Pebbles Part 2 |
| October 24 | Battle of the Bulge Part 1 |
| October 31 | Battle of the Bulge Part 2 |
| November 7 | Marriage on the Rocks |
| November 14 | Anzio |
| November 21 | Born Free |
| November 28 | The Great Race Part 1 |
| December 5 | The Great Race Part 2 |
| December 12 | Will Penny |
| December 19 | The Homecoming: A Christmas Story |
| December 26 | D-Day the Sixth of June |

=== 1972 ===
| Date | Movie |
|---|---|
| January 2 | Up the Down Staircase |
| January 9 | Stay Away, Joe |
| January 16 | The Bridge on the River Kwai Part 1 |
| January 23 | The Bridge on the River Kwai Part 2 |
| January 30 | Welcome Home, Johnny Bristol |
| February 6 | The Brotherhood of the Bell |
| February 13 | Ben-Hur Part 1 |
| February 20 | Ben-Hur Part 2 |
| February 27 | Anzio |
| March 5 | A Fine Madness |
| March 12 | Five Million Years to Earth |
| March 19 | Easy Come, Easy Go |
| April 2 | The Shoes of the Fisherman |
| April 9 | Don't Raise the Bridge, Lower the River |
| April 16 | Tarzan and the Jungle Boy |
| April 23 | Funeral in Berlin |
| April 30 | Up the Down Staircase |
| May 7 | Enter Laughing |
| May 14 | The Firechasers |
| May 21 | Gentle Giant |
| May 28 | A Dandy in Aspic |
| June 4 | D-Day the Sixth of June |
| June 11 | Killer by Night |
| June 18 | Welcome Home, Johnny Bristol |
| July 2 | A Fine Madness |
| July 9 | Five Million Years to Earth |
| July 16 | Don't Raise the Bridge, Lower the River |
| July 23 | Tarzan and the Jungle Boy |
| July 30 | Funeral in Berlin |
| August 6 | Gentle Giant |
| August 20 | A Dandy in Aspic |
| August 27 | Assignment K |
| September 3 | Enter Laughing |
| October 29 | Yellow Submarine |

=== 1981 ===
| Date | Movie |
|---|---|
| March 22 | Gone with the Wind |

=== 1986 ===
| Date | Movie |
|---|---|
| January 12 | Rockabye |
| January 19 | |
| January 26 | |
| February 2 | |
| February 9 | |
| February 16 | |
| February 23 | |
| March 2 | |
| March 9 | |
| March 16 | |
| March 23 | |
| March 30 | |
| April 6 | |
| April 13 | |
| April 20 | |
| April 27 | |
| May 4 | |
| May 11 | |
| May 18 | |
| May 25 | |
| June 1 | |
| June 8 | |
| June 15 | |
| June 22 | |
| June 29 | |
| July 6 | |
| July 13 | |
| July 20 | |
| July 27 | |

=== 1988 ===
| Date | Movie |
|---|---|
| March 20 | Hot Paint |

=== 1989 ===
| Date | Movie |
|---|---|
| May 7 | Witness |
| October 8 | Mystic Pizza |
| October 15 | The Big Easy |

=== 1990 ===
| Date | Movie |
|---|---|
| March 18 | Gunsmoke: The Last Apache |
| May 6 | The Untouchables |
| October 1 | Night Walk |
| November 11 | Fatal Attraction |
| November 18 | Moonstruck |
| December 2 | The Fatal Image |
| December 9 | Donor |

=== 1992 ===
| Date | Movie |
|---|---|
| March 29 | Highway Heartbreaker |
| April 12 | Stompin' At The Savoy |
| April 29 | Batman |
| May 12 | With Murder in Mind |
| September 20 | Terror on Track 9 |
| September 27 | A House of Secrets and Lies |
| December 6 | A Man Upstairs |

=== 1993 ===
| Date | Movie |
|---|---|
| March 14 | Men Don't Tell |
| March 21 | Without a Kiss Goodbye |
| April 11 | Steel Magnolias |
| August 22 | Highway Heartbreaker |
| November 7 | Ghost |

=== 1994 ===
| Date | Movie |
|---|---|
| May 8 | Robin Hood: Prince of Thieves |
| July 3 | Glory |

=== 1995 ===
| Date | Movie |
|---|---|
| January 15 | Presumed Innocent |
| July 2 | Nuts |
| September 10 | Only the Lonely |

=== 1996 ===
| Date | Movie |
|---|---|
| March 17 | A Husband, A Wife, And A Lover |
| March 24 | A Stranger to Love |
| June 30 | For the Boys |
| July 21 | The Godfather Part III |
| August 11 | Dying Young |

=== 1997 ===
| Date | Movie |
|---|---|
| February 16 | Dave |
| March 16 | Stolen Women: Captured Hearts |
| March 23 | 20,000 Leagues Under the Sea |
| August 24 | The Man Without a Face |
| July 13 | The Godfather, Part III |

=== 1998 ===
| Date | Movie |
|---|---|
| March 15 | A Father for Brittany |
| March 22 | It Could Happen to You |
| August 9 | Philadelphia |
| September 13 | Goodfellas |
| September 20 | The Marriage Fool |

=== 1999 ===
| Date | Movie |
|---|---|
| January 3 | Sabrina |
| January 17 | Dead Man Walking |
| March 14 | Replacing Dad |
| March 21 | Grumpy Old Men |
| May 2 | The First Wives Club |
| July 4 | Blue Sky |
| August 22 | To Sir, with Love II |

=== 2000 ===
| Date | Movie |
|---|---|
| January 16 | Murder at 1600 |
| January 23 | Fire Down Below |
| March 19 | The Color of Love: Jacey's Story |
| March 26 | Passenger 57 |
| April 23 | Michael |
| September 24 | L.A. Confidential |
| October 1 | City of Angels |

=== 2001 ===
| Date | Movie |
|---|---|
| January 14 | Tomorrow Never Dies |
| January 21 | Absolute Power |
| February 25 | The Mask of Zorro |
| March 4 | Eraser |
| March 18 | For Love of Olivia |
| March 25 | Executive Decision |
| April 15 | Deep Impact |
| June 10 | Something to Talk About |
| June 17 | Chance of a Lifetime |
| June 24 | Grace and Glorie |
| July 1 | Bella Mafia |
| July 8 | A Father for Brittany |
| July 15 | To Live Again |
| July 22 | Going Home |
| July 29 | The Staircase |
| August 19 | Tin Cup |
| November 25 | You've Got Mail |
| December 30 | Eraser |

=== 2002 ===
| Date | Movie |
|---|---|
| January 6 | Entrapment |
| February 17 | The Fugitive |
| March 17 | Beyond the Prairie: The True Story of Laura Ingalls Wilder |
| March 24 | Executive Decision |
| March 31 | Analyze This |
| April 7 | The Deep End of the Ocean |
| April 14 | The Pilot’s Wife |
| May 12 | Double Jeopardy |
| June 16 | The Negotiator |
| July 7 | A Time to Kill |
| August 4 | Missing Pieces |
| September 15 | Message in a Bottle |
| October 6 | Hell on Heels: The Battle of Mary Kay |
| November 3 | The World Is Not Enough |

=== 2003 ===
| Date | Movie |
|---|---|
| March 23 | Shanghai Noon |
| April 6 | The Whole Nine Yards |
| July 6 | Wild Wild West |
| August 3 | Instinct |
| August 17 | True Crime |
| September 14 | Out of Sight |
| October 26 | What Women Want |
| December 28 | One True Thing |

=== 2004 ===
| Date | Movie |
|---|---|
| January 18 | Double Jeopardy |
| February 29 | Rules of Engagement |
| March 21 | Proof of Life |
| March 28 | Jesus |
| April 11 | The Patriot |
| April 18 | Along Came a Spider |
| June 20 | The Cider House Rules |
| August 22 | Pay it Forward |
| December 26 | Ocean's Eleven |

=== 2005 ===
| Date | Movie |
|---|---|
| January 2 | Behind Enemy Lines |
| February 20 | Stone Cold |
| February 27 | Collateral Damage |
| March 27 | James Patterson's Suzanne's Diary for Nicholas |
| April 3 | John Q. |
| April 10 | High Crimes |
| April 17 | Don't Say a Word |
| June 26 | Changing Lanes |
| July 31 | I Am Sam |
| October 23 | Enough |

=== 2006 ===
| Date | Movie |
|---|---|
| January 1 | Surrender, Dorothy |
| January 15 | Jesse Stone: Night Passage |
| February 12 | The Sum of All Fears |
| February 19 | Terminator 3: Rise of the Machines |
| March 12 | How to Lose a Guy in 10 Days |
| March 19 | Time Bomb |
| April 9 | Robert Ludlum's Covert One: The Hades Factor |
| April 30 | Jesse Stone: Death in Paradise |
| May 28 | We Were Soldiers |
| June 4 | Ocean's Eleven |
| June 18 | What Women Want |

=== 2007 ===
| Date | Movie |
|---|---|
| May 20 | Million Dollar Baby |

=== 2015 ===
| Date | Movie |
|---|---|
| February 22 | Act of Valor |

=== 2020 ===
| Date | Movie |
|---|---|
| May 3 | Raiders of the Lost Ark |
| May 10 | Forrest Gump |
| May 17 | Mission: Impossible |
| May 24 | Titanic |
| May 31 | Indiana Jones and the Last Crusade |
| June 7 | Grease Sing-Along |
| October 4 | Old School |
| October 11 | Clueless |
| October 18 | Ferris Bueller's Day Off |
| October 25 | Scream |
| November 1 | Star Trek Beyond |
| November 29 | Coming to America |

=== 2021 ===
| Date | Movie |
|---|---|
| May 30 | Gladiator |
| June 20 | Selma |
| September 5 | School of Rock |
| October 3 | Star Trek |

=== 2022 ===
| Date | Movie |
|---|---|
| May 14 | Top Gun |
| December 4 | Fit For Christmas |
| December 11 | Must Love Christmas |
| December 18 | When Christmas Was Young |

=== 2023 ===
| Date | Movie |
|---|---|
| May 26 | Star Trek Into Darkness |
| June 5 | Mission: Impossible – Rogue Nation |

=== 2024 ===
None

=== 2025 ===
None

=== 2026 ===
| Date | Movie |
|---|---|
| July 1 | Top Gun: Maverick |
