= List of awards and nominations received by Friends =

Awards and nominations received by Friends
Awards and nominations
Award	Wins	Nominations
American Comedy Awards	1	14
Art Directors Guild Awards	0	1
Artios Awards	0	5
ASCAP Film and Television Music Awards	11	11
Banff Rockie Awards	0	2
BMI Film & TV Awards	9	9
British Academy Television Awards	1	1
British Comedy Awards	0	1
Critics' Choice Television Awards	0	1
Directors Guild of America Awards	0	1
GLAAD Media Awards	1	3
Golden Globe Awards	1	10
Hollywood Critics Association TV Awards	0	1
ICG Publicists Awards	1	1
Logie Awards	3	4
Make-Up Artists and Hair Stylists Guild Awards	0	2
National Television Awards	0	8
Nickelodeon Kids' Choice Awards	0	14
People's Choice Awards	11	17
Primetime Emmy Awards	6	67
Producers Guild of America Awards	0	2
Satellite Awards	1	9
Screen Actors Guild Awards	2	14
Teen Choice Awards	12	19
Television Critics Association Awards	1	7
TV Guide Awards	1	11
TV Land Awards	0	8
TV Quick Awards	3	5
Viewers for Quality Television Awards	0	5
Writers Guild of America Awards	0	2
Young Artist Awards	0	1

Totals (Note: Certain award groups do not simply award one winner. They acknowledge several different recipients, have runners-up, and have third place. Since this is a specific recognition and is different from losing an award, runner-up mentions are considered wins in this award tally. For simplification and to avoid errors, each award in this list has been presumed to have had a prior nomination.)
- Wins: 65
- Nominations: 256

Friends is an American television sitcom created by David Crane and Marta Kauffman for NBC. Starring Jennifer Aniston as Rachel Green, Courteney Cox as Monica Geller, Lisa Kudrow as Phoebe Buffay, Matt LeBlanc as Joey Tribbiani, Matthew Perry as Chandler Bing, and David Schwimmer as Ross Geller, it premiered on September 22, 1994, as part of NBC's Must See TV lineup. Its finale aired on May 6, 2004, after ten seasons and 236 episodes. The show follows the characters' personal and professional lives in New York City; according to Crane and Kauffman's original pitch, the show "is about friendship because when you're single and in the city, your friends are your family". Friends became a massive success both during and after its run, and it has frequently been named one of the greatest television shows of all time.

The series has been recognized with numerous accolades, including six Primetime Emmy Awards from sixty-two nominations. (Note: This total is based on the official count from the Academy of Television Arts & Sciences. It does not include the specials Friends: The One Before The Last One or Friends: The Reunion, which were nominated for one and four Emmys, respectively. Both specials have been included in the list below.) At the 54th Primetime Emmy Awards in 2002, Friends won the Emmy for Outstanding Comedy Series for its eighth season, which coincided with the year the show was the most-watched program in the United States; it received five additional nominations for Outstanding Comedy Series during its run. The main cast members all submitted themselves for supporting acting nominations at the Emmys until 2002, when they submitted themselves for lead acting. Kudrow won the award for Outstanding Supporting Actress in a Comedy Series at the 50th Primetime Emmy Awards in 1998, while Aniston won for Outstanding Lead Actress in a Comedy Series in 2002; LeBlanc, Perry, and Schwimmer also received Emmy nominations for their performances. Michael Lembeck won an Emmy for directing "The One After the Superbowl", and Bruce Willis and Christina Applegate won Emmys for their guest performances.

Friends was also recognized by many guilds and critics' associations. It won two Screen Actors Guild Awards – one for its ensemble and one for Kudrow – from fourteen nominations. Additionally, it received nominations for a Directors Guild of America Award, two Producers Guild of America Awards, and two Writers Guild of America Awards. The show was nominated for ten Golden Globe Awards and nine Satellite Awards, winning one of each for Aniston's and Kudrow's performances, respectively. It was nominated for six Television Critics Association Awards before receiving the TCA Heritage Award in 2018. The show also saw large success from awards selected by the public, winning eleven People's Choice Awards and twelve Teen Choice Awards. Internationally, the series won a British Academy Television Award and three Logie Awards and earned nominations for two Banff Rockie Awards, a British Comedy Award, and eight National Television Awards.

== Awards and nominations ==
Awards and nominations received by Friends
Awards	Year (Note: The listed year refers to the date of the ceremony, not necessarily the year in which the corresponding season or episode aired.)	Category	Nominee(s)	Result	Ref.
American Comedy Awards	1996	Funniest Supporting Female Performer in a Television Series	Jennifer Aniston	Nominated	
American Comedy Awards	1996	Funniest Supporting Female Performer in a Television Series	Lisa Kudrow	Nominated	
American Comedy Awards	1996	Funniest Supporting Male Performer in a Television Series	Matthew Perry	Nominated	
American Comedy Awards	1996	Funniest Supporting Male Performer in a Television Series	David Schwimmer	Nominated	
American Comedy Awards	1997	Funniest Supporting Female Performer in a Television Series	Lisa Kudrow	Nominated	
American Comedy Awards	1997	Funniest Female Guest Performer in a Television Series	Brooke Shields	Nominated	
American Comedy Awards	1999	Funniest Supporting Female Performer in a Television Series	Jennifer Aniston	Nominated	
American Comedy Awards	1999	Funniest Supporting Female Performer in a Television Series	Courteney Cox	Nominated	
American Comedy Awards	1999	Funniest Supporting Female Performer in a Television Series	Lisa Kudrow	Nominated	
American Comedy Awards	2000	Funniest Supporting Female Performer in a Television Series	Lisa Kudrow	Won	
American Comedy Awards	2001	Funniest Supporting Female Performer in a Television Series	Jennifer Aniston	Nominated	
American Comedy Awards	2001	Funniest Supporting Female Performer in a Television Series	Lisa Kudrow	Nominated	
American Comedy Awards	2001	Funniest Female Guest Appearance in a Television Series	Reese Witherspoon	Nominated	
American Comedy Awards	2001	Funniest Male Guest Appearance in a Television Series	Bruce Willis	Nominated	
Art Directors Guild Awards	2003	Episode of a Multi-Camera Television Series	John Shaffner and Joe Stewart (for "The One Where Rachel Has a Baby, Parts 1 & 2")	Nominated	
Artios Awards	1995	Outstanding Achievement in Pilot Casting	Ellie Kanner	Nominated	
Artios Awards	1996	Outstanding Achievement in Comedy Episodic Casting	Leslie Litt	Nominated	
Artios Awards	1999	Outstanding Achievement in Comedy Episodic Casting	Leslie Litt and Barbara Miller	Nominated	
Artios Awards	2001	Outstanding Achievement in Comedy Episodic Casting	Leslie Litt and Barbara Miller	Nominated	
Artios Awards	2002	Outstanding Achievement in Comedy Episodic Casting	Leslie Litt and Barbara Miller	Nominated	
ASCAP Film and Television Music Awards	1995	Top Television Series	Michael Skloff	Won (Note: The award recognizes multiple composers each year.)	
ASCAP Film and Television Music Awards	1996	Top Television Series	Michael Skloff	Won	
ASCAP Film and Television Music Awards	1997	Top Television Series	Michael Skloff	Won	
ASCAP Film and Television Music Awards	1998	Top Television Series	Michael Skloff	Won	
ASCAP Film and Television Music Awards	1999	Top Television Series	Michael Skloff	Won	
ASCAP Film and Television Music Awards	2000	Top Television Series	Michael Skloff	Won	
ASCAP Film and Television Music Awards	2001	Top Television Series	Michael Skloff	Won	
ASCAP Film and Television Music Awards	2002	Top Television Series	Michael Skloff	Won	
ASCAP Film and Television Music Awards	2003	Top Television Series	Michael Skloff	Won	
ASCAP Film and Television Music Awards	2004	Top Television Series	Michael Skloff	Won	
ASCAP Film and Television Music Awards	2005	Top Television Series	Michael Skloff	Won	
Banff Rockie Awards	1996	Best Comedy	Friends (for "The One with the Prom Video")	Nominated	
Banff Rockie Awards	2001	Best Comedy	Friends (for "The One Where They All Turn Thirty")	Nominated	
BMI Film & TV Awards	1996	BMI TV Music Award	Danny Wilde and Allee Willis	Won	
BMI Film & TV Awards	1997	BMI TV Music Award	Allee Willis	Won	
BMI Film & TV Awards	1998	BMI TV Music Award	Allee Willis	Won	
BMI Film & TV Awards	1999	BMI TV Music Award	Allee Willis	Won	
BMI Film & TV Awards	2000	BMI TV Music Award	Allee Willis	Won	
BMI Film & TV Awards	2001	BMI TV Music Award	Allee Willis	Won	
BMI Film & TV Awards	2002	BMI TV Music Award	Allee Willis	Won	
BMI Film & TV Awards	2003	BMI TV Music Award	Allee Willis	Won	
BMI Film & TV Awards	2004	BMI TV Music Award	Allee Willis	Won	
British Academy Television Awards	1998	Best International Programme	Friends	Won	
British Comedy Awards	2003	Best International Comedy Show	Friends	Nominated	
Critics' Choice Television Awards	2016	Most Bingeworthy Show (Note: Award voted on by fans)	Friends	Nominated	
Directors Guild of America Awards	1996	Outstanding Directorial Achievement in Comedy Series	James Burrows (for "The One with the Birth") (Note: Additional nominees: Steven Pomeroy (unit production manager/first assistant director); Joel M. Wang (second assistant director); Jeffrey A. Wheat (technical coordinator))	Nominated	
GLAAD Media Awards	1995	Outstanding Comedy Series	Friends	Won (Note: Tied with Roseanne)	
GLAAD Media Awards	1996	Outstanding Television Series	Friends	Nominated	
GLAAD Media Awards	1997	Outstanding Comedy Series	Friends	Nominated	
Golden Globe Awards	1996	Best Television Series – Musical or Comedy	Friends	Nominated	
Golden Globe Awards	1996	Best Supporting Actress – Series, Miniseries or Movie Made for Television	Lisa Kudrow	Nominated	
Golden Globe Awards	1997	Best Television Series – Musical or Comedy	Friends	Nominated	
Golden Globe Awards	1998	Best Television Series – Musical or Comedy	Friends	Nominated	
Golden Globe Awards	2002	Best Television Series – Musical or Comedy	Friends	Nominated	
Golden Globe Awards	2002	Best Supporting Actress – Series, Miniseries or Television Movie	Jennifer Aniston	Nominated	
Golden Globe Awards	2003	Best Television Series – Musical or Comedy	Friends	Nominated	
Golden Globe Awards	2003	Best Actress in a Television Series – Musical or Comedy	Jennifer Aniston	Won	
Golden Globe Awards	2003	Best Actor in a Television Series – Musical or Comedy	Matt LeBlanc	Nominated	
Golden Globe Awards	2004	Best Actor in a Television Series – Musical or Comedy	Matt LeBlanc	Nominated	
Hollywood Critics Association TV Awards	2021	Best Streaming Sketch Series, Variety Series, Talk Show, or Comedy/Variety Special	Friends: The Reunion	Nominated	
ICG Publicists Awards	1996	Maxwell Weinberg Publicists Showmanship Award – Television	NBC and Warner Bros. Publicity Departments	Won	
Logie Awards	2003	Most Popular Overseas Program	Friends	Won	
Logie Awards	2004	Most Popular Overseas Comedy	Friends	Won	
Logie Awards	2004	Most Popular Overseas TV Star	Jennifer Aniston	Won	
Logie Awards	2005	Most Popular Overseas Program	Friends	Nominated	
Make-Up Artists and Hair Stylists Guild Awards	2001	Best Contemporary Makeup – TV Series Episode	Robin Siegel, Beth Katz, Anne Sweeting, and Kevin Haney (for "The One That Could Have Been")	Nominated	
Make-Up Artists and Hair Stylists Guild Awards	2002	Best Contemporary Makeup for a Television Series	Robin Siegel, Beth Katz, and Sheree Morgan (for "The One with the Halloween Party")	Nominated	
National Television Awards	1997	Most Popular Comedy Programme	Friends	Nominated	
National Television Awards	1998	Most Popular Comedy Programme	Friends	Nominated	
National Television Awards	1999	Most Popular Comedy Programme	Friends	Nominated	
National Television Awards	2000	Most Popular Comedy Programme	Friends	Nominated	
National Television Awards	2001	Most Popular Comedy Programme	Friends	Nominated	
National Television Awards	2002	Most Popular Comedy Programme	Friends	Nominated	
National Television Awards	2003	Most Popular Comedy Programme	Friends	Nominated	
National Television Awards	2004	Most Popular Comedy Programme	Friends	Nominated	
Nickelodeon Kids' Choice Awards	1996	Favorite Animal Star	Marcel the monkey	Nominated	
Nickelodeon Kids' Choice Awards	1997	Favorite TV Actress	Jennifer Aniston	Nominated	
Nickelodeon Kids' Choice Awards	1997	Favorite TV Actress	Courteney Cox	Nominated	
Nickelodeon Kids' Choice Awards	1999	Favorite TV Actress	Jennifer Aniston	Nominated	
Nickelodeon Kids' Choice Awards	2000	Favorite TV Friends	Jennifer Aniston, Courteney Cox, and Lisa Kudrow	Nominated	
Nickelodeon Kids' Choice Awards	2001	Favorite TV Show	Friends	Nominated	
Nickelodeon Kids' Choice Awards	2002	Favorite TV Show	Friends	Nominated	
Nickelodeon Kids' Choice Awards	2002	Favorite TV Actress	Jennifer Aniston	Nominated	
Nickelodeon Kids' Choice Awards	2002	Favorite TV Actor	Matt LeBlanc	Nominated	
Nickelodeon Kids' Choice Awards	2002	Favorite TV Actor	Matthew Perry	Nominated	
Nickelodeon Kids' Choice Awards	2003	Favorite TV Show	Friends	Nominated	
Nickelodeon Kids' Choice Awards	2003	Favorite TV Actress	Jennifer Aniston	Nominated	
Nickelodeon Kids' Choice Awards	2004	Favorite TV Show	Friends	Nominated	
Nickelodeon Kids' Choice Awards	2004	Favorite TV Actress	Jennifer Aniston	Nominated	
People's Choice Awards	1995	Favorite New Television Comedy Series	Friends	Won (Note: Tied with Ellen)	
People's Choice Awards	1995	Favorite Female Television Performer in a New Series	Courteney Cox	Nominated	
People's Choice Awards	1996	Favorite Television Comedy Series	Friends	Nominated	
People's Choice Awards	1997	Favorite Television Comedy Series	Friends	Nominated	
People's Choice Awards	1999	Favorite Television Comedy Series	Friends	Nominated	
People's Choice Awards	2000	Favorite Television Comedy Series	Friends	Won	
People's Choice Awards	2000	Favorite Female Television Performer	Jennifer Aniston	Nominated	
People's Choice Awards	2001	Favorite Television Comedy Series	Friends	Won	
People's Choice Awards	2001	Favorite Female Television Performer	Jennifer Aniston	Won	
People's Choice Awards	2002	Favorite Television Comedy Series	Friends	Won	
People's Choice Awards	2002	Favorite Female Television Performer	Jennifer Aniston	Won	
People's Choice Awards	2003	Favorite Television Comedy Series	Friends	Won	
People's Choice Awards	2003	Favorite Female Television Performer	Jennifer Aniston	Won	
People's Choice Awards	2003	Favorite Male Television Performer	Matt LeBlanc	Nominated	
People's Choice Awards	2004	Favorite Television Comedy Series	Friends	Won	
People's Choice Awards	2004	Favorite Female Television Performer	Jennifer Aniston	Won	
People's Choice Awards	2021	The Pop Special of 2021	Friends: The Reunion	Won	
Primetime Emmy Awards	1995	Outstanding Comedy Series	Friends (Note: Nominees: Kevin S. Bright, Marta Kauffman, and David Crane (executive producers); Jeff Greenstein and Jeff Strauss (supervising producers); Todd Stevens (producer))	Nominated	
Primetime Emmy Awards	1995	Outstanding Supporting Actress in a Comedy Series	Lisa Kudrow	Nominated	
Primetime Emmy Awards	1995	Outstanding Supporting Actor in a Comedy Series	David Schwimmer	Nominated	
Primetime Emmy Awards	1995	Outstanding Directing in a Comedy Series	James Burrows (for "The One with the Blackout")	Nominated	
Primetime Emmy Awards	1995	Outstanding Writing in a Comedy Series	Jeff Greenstein and Jeff Strauss (for "The One Where Underdog Gets Away")	Nominated	
Primetime Emmy Awards	1996	Outstanding Comedy Series	Friends (Note: Nominees: Kevin S. Bright, Marta Kauffman, and David Crane (executive producers); Michael Borkow (supervising producer); Todd Stevens and Betsy Borns (producers))	Nominated	
Primetime Emmy Awards	1996	Outstanding Directing in a Comedy Series	Michael Lembeck (for "The One After the Superbowl, Part 1 & 2")	Won	
Primetime Emmy Awards	1997	Outstanding Supporting Actress in a Comedy Series	Lisa Kudrow	Nominated	
Primetime Emmy Awards	1998	Outstanding Supporting Actress in a Comedy Series	Lisa Kudrow	Won	
Primetime Emmy Awards	1999	Outstanding Comedy Series	Friends (Note: Nominees: Kevin S. Bright, Marta Kauffman, David Crane, Adam Chase, Michael Curtis, and Greg Malins (executive producers); Alexa Junge (co-executive producer); Todd Stevens, Wil Calhoun, and Seth Kurland (supervising producers); Scott Silveri, Shana Goldberg-Meehan, Andrew Reich, Ted Cohen, and Wendy Knoller (producers); Richard Allen (coordinating producer))	Nominated	
Primetime Emmy Awards	1999	Outstanding Supporting Actress in a Comedy Series	Lisa Kudrow	Nominated	
Primetime Emmy Awards	1999	Outstanding Directing for a Comedy Series	Michael Lembeck (for "The One Where Everybody Finds Out")	Nominated	
Primetime Emmy Awards	1999	Outstanding Writing for a Comedy Series	Alexa Junge (for "The One Where Everybody Finds Out")	Nominated	
Primetime Emmy Awards	2000	Outstanding Comedy Series	Friends (Note: Nominees: Kevin S. Bright, Marta Kauffman, David Crane, Adam Chase, and Greg Malins (executive producers); Seth Kurland, Shana Goldberg-Meehan, and Scott Silveri (co-executive producers); Todd Stevens, Andrew Reich, and Ted Cohen (supervising producers); Wendy Knoller (producer))	Nominated	
Primetime Emmy Awards	2000	Outstanding Supporting Actress in a Comedy Series	Jennifer Aniston	Nominated	
Primetime Emmy Awards	2000	Outstanding Supporting Actress in a Comedy Series	Lisa Kudrow	Nominated	
Primetime Emmy Awards	2000	Outstanding Directing for a Comedy Series	Michael Lembeck (for "The One That Could Have Been, Parts 1 & 2")	Nominated	
Primetime Emmy Awards	2001	Outstanding Supporting Actress in a Comedy Series	Jennifer Aniston	Nominated	
Primetime Emmy Awards	2001	Outstanding Supporting Actress in a Comedy Series	Lisa Kudrow	Nominated	
Primetime Emmy Awards	2002	Outstanding Comedy Series	Friends (Note: Nominees: Kevin S. Bright, Marta Kauffman, David Crane, Scott Silveri, Shana Goldberg-Meehan, Andrew Reich, and Ted Cohen (executive producers); Todd Stevens (co-executive producer); Sherry Bilsing, Ellen Plummer, Brian Buckner, and Sebastian Jones (supervising producers); Wendy Knoller (producer))	Won	
Primetime Emmy Awards	2002	Outstanding Lead Actress in a Comedy Series	Jennifer Aniston	Won	
Primetime Emmy Awards	2002	Outstanding Lead Actor in a Comedy Series	Matt LeBlanc	Nominated	
Primetime Emmy Awards	2002	Outstanding Lead Actor in a Comedy Series	Matthew Perry	Nominated	
Primetime Emmy Awards	2003	Outstanding Comedy Series	Friends (Note: Nominees: Kevin S. Bright, Marta Kauffman, David Crane, Scott Silveri, Shana Goldberg-Meehan, Andrew Reich, and Ted Cohen (executive producers); Todd Stevens, Sherry Bilsing, Ellen Plummer, Brian Buckner, and Sebastian Jones (co-executive producers); Wendy Knoller, Mark Kunerth, and Dana Klein (producers))	Nominated	
Primetime Emmy Awards	2003	Outstanding Lead Actress in a Comedy Series	Jennifer Aniston	Nominated	
Primetime Emmy Awards	2003	Outstanding Lead Actor in a Comedy Series	Matt LeBlanc	Nominated	
Primetime Emmy Awards	2004	Outstanding Lead Actress in a Comedy Series	Jennifer Aniston	Nominated	
Primetime Emmy Awards	2004	Outstanding Lead Actor in a Comedy Series	Matt LeBlanc	Nominated	
Primetime Emmy Awards	2021	Outstanding Variety Special (Pre-Recorded)	Friends: The Reunion (Note: Nominees: Ben Winston, Kevin S. Bright, Marta Kauffman, David Crane, Jennifer Aniston, Courteney Cox, Lisa Kudrow, Matt LeBlanc, Matthew Perry, and David Schwimmer (executive producers); Emma Conway, James Longman, and Stacey Thomas-Muir (co-executive producers); Brett Blakeney (supervising producer); Dave Piendak, Carly Robyn Segal, Guy Harding, Paul Monaghan, Tracie Fiss, Mike Darnell, and Brooke Karzen (producers); James Corden (producer/host))	Nominated	
Primetime Creative Arts Emmy Awards	1995	Outstanding Art Direction for a Series	John Shaffner and Greg Grande (for "The One Where Rachel Finds Out")	Nominated	
Primetime Creative Arts Emmy Awards	1995	Outstanding Editing for a Series – Multi-Camera Production	Andy Zall (for "The One with Two Parts, Part 2")	Nominated	
Primetime Creative Arts Emmy Awards	1995	Outstanding Guest Actress in a Comedy Series	Christina Pickles (for "The One Where Nana Dies Twice")	Nominated	
Primetime Creative Arts Emmy Awards	1995	Outstanding Main Title Theme Music	Michael Skloff and Allee Willis	Nominated	
Primetime Creative Arts Emmy Awards	1996	Outstanding Guest Actress in a Comedy Series	Marlo Thomas (for "The One with the Lesbian Wedding")	Nominated	
Primetime Creative Arts Emmy Awards	1999	Outstanding Costume Design for a Series	Debra McGuire (for "The One with All the Thanksgivings")	Nominated	
Primetime Creative Arts Emmy Awards	1999	Outstanding Sound Mixing for a Comedy Series or a Special	Dana Mark McClure, Charlie McDaniel III, Kathy Oldham, and John Bickelhaupt (for "The One with All the Thanksgivings")	Nominated	
Primetime Creative Arts Emmy Awards	2000	Outstanding Guest Actor in a Comedy Series	Tom Selleck	Nominated	
Primetime Creative Arts Emmy Awards	2000	Outstanding Guest Actor in a Comedy Series	Bruce Willis	Won	
Primetime Creative Arts Emmy Awards	2000	Outstanding Multi-Camera Picture Editing for a Series	Stephen Prime (for "The One with the Proposal, Parts 1 & 2")	Nominated	
Primetime Creative Arts Emmy Awards	2000	Outstanding Sound Mixing for a Comedy Series or a Special	Dana Mark McClure, Charlie McDaniel III, John Bickelhaupt, and Kathy Oldham (for "The One After Vegas")	Nominated	
Primetime Creative Arts Emmy Awards	2001	Outstanding Art Direction for a Multi-Camera Series	John Shaffner, Joe Stewart, and Greg Grande (for "The One with Monica and Chandler's Wedding")	Nominated	
Primetime Creative Arts Emmy Awards	2001	Outstanding Guest Actress in a Comedy Series	Susan Sarandon	Nominated	
Primetime Creative Arts Emmy Awards	2001	Outstanding Guest Actor in a Comedy Series	Gary Oldman	Nominated	
Primetime Creative Arts Emmy Awards	2002	Outstanding Art Direction for a Multi-Camera Series	John Shaffner, Joe Stewart, and Greg Grande (for "The One Where Rachel Has a Baby, Parts 1 & 2")	Nominated	
Primetime Creative Arts Emmy Awards	2002	Outstanding Casting for a Comedy Series	Leslie Litt and Barbara Miller	Nominated	
Primetime Creative Arts Emmy Awards	2002	Outstanding Cinematography for a Multi-Camera Series	Nick McLean (for "The One with the Rumor")	Nominated	
Primetime Creative Arts Emmy Awards	2002	Outstanding Guest Actor in a Comedy Series	Brad Pitt	Nominated	
Primetime Creative Arts Emmy Awards	2002	Outstanding Multi-Camera Picture Editing for a Series	Stephen Prime (for "The One with the Rumor")	Nominated	
Primetime Creative Arts Emmy Awards	2002	Outstanding Multi-Camera Picture Editing for a Series	Kenny Tintorri (for "The One with the Halloween Party")	Nominated	
Primetime Creative Arts Emmy Awards	2002	Outstanding Multi-Camera Sound Mixing for a Series or Special	Dana Mark McClure, Charlie McDaniel III, Kathy Oldham, and John Bickelhaupt (for "The One Where Rachel Has a Baby, Parts 1 & 2")	Nominated	
Primetime Creative Arts Emmy Awards	2003	Outstanding Art Direction for a Multi-Camera Series	John Shaffner, Joe Stewart, and Greg Grande (for "The One in Barbados, Parts 1 & 2")	Nominated	
Primetime Creative Arts Emmy Awards	2003	Outstanding Casting for a Comedy Series	Leslie Litt and Barbara Miller	Nominated	
Primetime Creative Arts Emmy Awards	2003	Outstanding Cinematography for a Multi-Camera Series	Nick McLean (for "The One in Barbados")	Nominated	
Primetime Creative Arts Emmy Awards	2003	Outstanding Guest Actress in a Comedy Series	Christina Applegate	Won	
Primetime Creative Arts Emmy Awards	2003	Outstanding Guest Actor in a Comedy Series	Hank Azaria	Nominated	
Primetime Creative Arts Emmy Awards	2003	Outstanding Multi-Camera Picture Editing for a Series	Stephen Prime (for "The One in Barbados")	Nominated	
Primetime Creative Arts Emmy Awards	2003	Outstanding Multi-Camera Picture Editing for a Series	Kenny Tintorri (for "The One with Ross's Inappropriate Song")	Nominated	
Primetime Creative Arts Emmy Awards	2003	Outstanding Multi-Camera Sound Mixing for a Series or Special	Charlie McDaniel III, Dana Mark McClure, and John Bickelhaupt (for "The One in Barbados, Parts 1 & 2")	Nominated	
Primetime Creative Arts Emmy Awards	2004	Outstanding Cinematography for a Multi-Camera Series	Nick McLean (for "The One with Phoebe's Wedding")	Nominated	
Primetime Creative Arts Emmy Awards	2004	Outstanding Guest Actress in a Comedy Series	Christina Applegate	Nominated	
Primetime Creative Arts Emmy Awards	2004	Outstanding Guest Actor in a Comedy Series	Danny DeVito	Nominated	
Primetime Creative Arts Emmy Awards	2004	Outstanding Multi-Camera Picture Editing for a Miniseries, Movie or a Special	Sven Nilsson, Stephen Prime, Todd Felker, and Kenny Tintorri (for Friends: The One Before the Last One – 10 Years of Friends)	Nominated	
Primetime Creative Arts Emmy Awards	2004	Outstanding Multi-Camera Picture Editing for a Series	Stephen Prime (for "The Last One")	Nominated	
Primetime Creative Arts Emmy Awards	2004	Outstanding Sound Mixing for a Comedy Series or a Special	Charlie McDaniel III, John Bickelhaupt, and Dana Mark McClure (for "The Last One, Part 1 & 2")	Nominated	
Primetime Creative Arts Emmy Awards	2021	Outstanding Directing for a Variety Special	Ben Winston (for Friends: The Reunion)	Nominated	
Primetime Creative Arts Emmy Awards	2021	Outstanding Lighting Design / Lighting Direction for a Variety Special	Noah Mitz, Madigan Stehly, Russell Fine, Lynn Costa, and Patrick Boozer (for Friends: The Reunion)	Nominated	
Primetime Creative Arts Emmy Awards	2021	Outstanding Production Design for a Variety Special	John Shaffner, Greg Grande, and Daren Janes (for Friends: The Reunion)	Nominated	
Producers Guild of America Awards	2001	Danny Thomas Producer of the Year Award in Episodic Television, Comedy	Friends (Note: Nominees: Kevin S. Bright, Marta Kauffman, David Crane, Wil Calhoun, and Todd Stevens)	Nominated	
Producers Guild of America Awards	2002	Danny Thomas Producer of the Year Award in Episodic Television, Comedy	Friends (Note: Nominees: Kevin S. Bright, Marta Kauffman, David Crane, Shana Goldberg-Meehan, Scott Silveri, Andrew Reich, Ted Cohen, and Todd Stevens)	Nominated	
Satellite Awards	2000	Best Actress in a Series, Comedy or Musical	Jennifer Aniston	Nominated	
Satellite Awards	2001	Best Television Series, Comedy or Musical	Friends	Nominated	
Satellite Awards	2001	Best Actress in a Series, Comedy or Musical	Lisa Kudrow	Won	
Satellite Awards	2002	Best Television Series, Comedy or Musical	Friends	Nominated	
Satellite Awards	2002	Best Actress in a Series, Comedy or Musical	Lisa Kudrow	Nominated	
Satellite Awards	2003	Best Television Series, Comedy or Musical	Friends	Nominated	
Satellite Awards	2003	Best Actress in a Series, Comedy or Musical	Jennifer Aniston	Nominated	
Satellite Awards	2003	Best Actor in a Series, Comedy or Musical	Matt LeBlanc	Nominated	
Satellite Awards	2004	Best Actor in a Supporting Role in a Series, Comedy or Musical	Matt LeBlanc	Nominated	
Screen Actors Guild Awards	1996	Outstanding Performance by an Ensemble in a Comedy Series	Friends (Note: Nominees: Jennifer Aniston, Courteney Cox, Lisa Kudrow, Matt LeBlanc, Matthew Perry, and David Schwimmer)	Won	
Screen Actors Guild Awards	1996	Outstanding Performance by a Female Actor in a Comedy Series	Lisa Kudrow	Nominated	
Screen Actors Guild Awards	1999	Outstanding Performance by an Ensemble in a Comedy Series	Friends	Nominated	
Screen Actors Guild Awards	1999	Outstanding Performance by a Female Actor in a Comedy Series	Lisa Kudrow	Nominated	
Screen Actors Guild Awards	2000	Outstanding Performance by an Ensemble in a Comedy Series	Friends	Nominated	
Screen Actors Guild Awards	2000	Outstanding Performance by a Female Actor in a Comedy Series	Lisa Kudrow	Won	
Screen Actors Guild Awards	2001	Outstanding Performance by an Ensemble in a Comedy Series	Friends	Nominated	
Screen Actors Guild Awards	2002	Outstanding Performance by an Ensemble in a Comedy Series	Friends	Nominated	
Screen Actors Guild Awards	2002	Outstanding Performance by a Female Actor in a Comedy Series	Jennifer Aniston	Nominated	
Screen Actors Guild Awards	2003	Outstanding Performance by an Ensemble in a Comedy Series	Friends	Nominated	
Screen Actors Guild Awards	2003	Outstanding Performance by a Female Actor in a Comedy Series	Jennifer Aniston	Nominated	
Screen Actors Guild Awards	2003	Outstanding Performance by a Male Actor in a Comedy Series	Matt LeBlanc	Nominated	
Screen Actors Guild Awards	2004	Outstanding Performance by an Ensemble in a Comedy Series	Friends	Nominated	
Screen Actors Guild Awards	2004	Outstanding Performance by a Female Actor in a Comedy Series	Lisa Kudrow	Nominated	
Teen Choice Awards	1999	Choice Comedy – TV	Friends	Won	
Teen Choice Awards	2000	Choice Comedy – TV	Friends	Won	
Teen Choice Awards	2001	Choice Comedy – TV	Friends	Won	
Teen Choice Awards	2002	Choice TV Show – Comedy	Friends	Won	
Teen Choice Awards	2002	Choice TV Actress – Comedy	Jennifer Aniston	Won	
Teen Choice Awards	2002	Choice TV Actress – Comedy	Courteney Cox	Nominated	
Teen Choice Awards	2002	Choice TV Actress – Comedy	Lisa Kudrow	Nominated	
Teen Choice Awards	2002	Choice TV Actor – Comedy	Matt LeBlanc	Won	
Teen Choice Awards	2003	Choice TV Show – Comedy	Friends	Won	
Teen Choice Awards	2003	Choice TV Actress – Comedy	Jennifer Aniston	Won	
Teen Choice Awards	2003	Choice TV Actress – Comedy	Courteney Cox	Nominated	
Teen Choice Awards	2003	Choice TV Actor – Comedy	Matt LeBlanc	Nominated	
Teen Choice Awards	2003	Choice Breakout TV Star – Female	Aisha Tyler	Nominated	
Teen Choice Awards	2004	Choice TV Show – Comedy	Friends	Won	
Teen Choice Awards	2004	Choice TV Actress – Comedy	Jennifer Aniston	Won	
Teen Choice Awards	2004	Choice TV Actor – Comedy	Matt LeBlanc	Nominated	
Teen Choice Awards	2004	Choice TV Actor – Comedy	Matthew Perry	Nominated	
Teen Choice Awards	2018	Choice Throwback TV Show	Friends	Won	
Teen Choice Awards	2019	Choice Throwback TV Show	Friends	Won	
Television Critics Association Awards	1995	Outstanding Achievement in Comedy	Friends	Nominated	
Television Critics Association Awards	1999	Outstanding Achievement in Comedy	Friends	Nominated	
Television Critics Association Awards	2002	Outstanding Achievement in Comedy	Friends	Nominated	
Television Critics Association Awards	2002	Individual Achievement in Comedy	Matt LeBlanc	Nominated	
Television Critics Association Awards	2004	Heritage Award	Friends	Nominated	
Television Critics Association Awards	2015	Heritage Award	Friends	Nominated	
Television Critics Association Awards	2018	Heritage Award	Friends	Won	
TV Guide Awards	1999	Favorite Comedy Series	Friends	Nominated	
TV Guide Awards	2000	Favorite Comedy Series	Friends	Nominated	
TV Guide Awards	2000	Favorite Actress in a Comedy	Lisa Kudrow	Nominated	
TV Guide Awards	2000	Editor's Award	Cast of Friends	Won	
TV Guide Awards	2001	Comedy Series of the Year	Friends	Nominated	(Note: For the 2001 ceremony, a first round of nominees was selected by television executives and announced in late December. These nominees were then voted on by the public to determine finalists, which were announced in late January, and the winners were announced at the ceremony in February. For the purposes of this list, "shortlisted" refers to a nomination that reached the first round but was not selected as a finalist.)
TV Guide Awards	2001	Actress of the Year in a Comedy Series	Jennifer Aniston	Shortlisted	(Note: For the 2001 ceremony, a first round of nominees was selected by television executives and announced in late December. These nominees were then voted on by the public to determine finalists, which were announced in late January, and the winners were announced at the ceremony in February. For the purposes of this list, "shortlisted" refers to a nomination that reached the first round but was not selected as a finalist.)
TV Guide Awards	2001	Actress of the Year in a Comedy Series	Courteney Cox	Shortlisted	(Note: For the 2001 ceremony, a first round of nominees was selected by television executives and announced in late December. These nominees were then voted on by the public to determine finalists, which were announced in late January, and the winners were announced at the ceremony in February. For the purposes of this list, "shortlisted" refers to a nomination that reached the first round but was not selected as a finalist.)
TV Guide Awards	2001	Actress of the Year in a Comedy Series	Lisa Kudrow	Shortlisted	(Note: For the 2001 ceremony, a first round of nominees was selected by television executives and announced in late December. These nominees were then voted on by the public to determine finalists, which were announced in late January, and the winners were announced at the ceremony in February. For the purposes of this list, "shortlisted" refers to a nomination that reached the first round but was not selected as a finalist.)
TV Guide Awards	2001	Actor of the Year in a Comedy Series	Matt LeBlanc	Shortlisted	(Note: For the 2001 ceremony, a first round of nominees was selected by television executives and announced in late December. These nominees were then voted on by the public to determine finalists, which were announced in late January, and the winners were announced at the ceremony in February. For the purposes of this list, "shortlisted" refers to a nomination that reached the first round but was not selected as a finalist.)
TV Guide Awards	2001	Actor of the Year in a Comedy Series	Matthew Perry	Shortlisted	(Note: For the 2001 ceremony, a first round of nominees was selected by television executives and announced in late December. These nominees were then voted on by the public to determine finalists, which were announced in late January, and the winners were announced at the ceremony in February. For the purposes of this list, "shortlisted" refers to a nomination that reached the first round but was not selected as a finalist.)
TV Guide Awards	2001	Actor of the Year in a Comedy Series	David Schwimmer	Shortlisted	(Note: For the 2001 ceremony, a first round of nominees was selected by television executives and announced in late December. These nominees were then voted on by the public to determine finalists, which were announced in late January, and the winners were announced at the ceremony in February. For the purposes of this list, "shortlisted" refers to a nomination that reached the first round but was not selected as a finalist.)
TV Land Awards	2005	The Most Happenin' Greasy Spoon or Hangout	Central Perk	Nominated	
TV Land Awards	2006	Most Memorable Kiss	Ross Geller (David Schwimmer) and Rachel Green (Jennifer Aniston)	Nominated	
TV Land Awards	2006	Most Wonderful Wedding	Monica Geller (Courteney Cox) and Chandler Bing (Matthew Perry)	Nominated	
TV Land Awards	2007	Break Up That Was So Bad It Was Good	Ross Geller (David Schwimmer) and Rachel Green (Jennifer Aniston)	Nominated	
TV Land Awards	2007	Fake Product You Want to Buy	The Man Bag	Nominated	
TV Land Awards	2007	Series Finale You Had a Party to Watch	Friends	Nominated	
TV Land Awards	2008	Best Hang Out	Central Perk	Nominated	
TV Land Awards	2008	Neighbor You Try to Avoid	Ugly Naked Guy	Nominated	
TV Quick Awards	1999	Best Television Import	Friends	Won	
TV Quick Awards	2000	Best Television Import	Friends	Won	
TV Quick Awards	2001	Best Comedy Show	Friends	Nominated	
TV Quick Awards	2002	Best Comedy Show	Friends	Nominated	
TV Quick Awards	2004	Best Comedy Show	Friends	Won	
Viewers for Quality Television Awards	1995	Best Quality Comedy	Friends	Nominated	
Viewers for Quality Television Awards	1995	Best Supporting Actor, Comedy	David Schwimmer	Nominated	
Viewers for Quality Television Awards	1996	Best Quality Comedy	Friends	Nominated	
Viewers for Quality Television Awards	1996	Best Supporting Actress, Comedy	Lisa Kudrow	Nominated	
Viewers for Quality Television Awards	2000	Best Quality Comedy	Friends	Nominated	
Writers Guild of America Awards	1996	Television: Episodic Comedy	Jeff Greenstein and Jeff Strauss (for "The One Where Underdog Gets Away")	Nominated	
Writers Guild of America Awards	2000	Television: Episodic Comedy	Alexa Junge (for "The One Where Everybody Finds Out")	Nominated	
Young Artist Awards	2000	Best Performance in a TV Comedy Series – Guest Starring Young Performer	Matt Weinberg	Nominated	

== Total nominations and awards for the cast ==
Awards and nominations received by cast members for Friends
Actor	Character	Nominations (Note: Awards for individual actors are counted here; group awards are omitted.)	Wins
Jennifer Aniston	Rachel Green	29	10
Lisa Kudrow	Phoebe Buffay	22	4
Matt LeBlanc	Joey Tribbiani	15	1
Courteney Cox	Monica Geller	6	0
Matthew Perry	Chandler Bing	5	0
David Schwimmer	Ross Geller	4	0
Christina Applegate	Amy Green	2	1
Bruce Willis	Paul Stevens	2	1
Hank Azaria	David	1	0
Danny DeVito	Roy	1	0
Gary Oldman	Richard Crosby	1	0
Christina Pickles	Judy Geller	1	0
Brad Pitt	Will Colbert	1	0
Susan Sarandon	Cecilia Monroe	1	0
Tom Selleck	Richard Burke	1	0
Brooke Shields	Erika Ford	1	0
Marlo Thomas	Sandra Green	1	0
Aisha Tyler	Charlie Wheeler	1	0
Reese Witherspoon	Jill Green	1	0
