= Friends season 8 =

Season of television series

Friends
- Season 8
- Friends season 8 DVD cover
- Showrunners: David Crane; Marta Kauffman
- Starring: Jennifer Aniston; Courteney Cox; Lisa Kudrow; Matt LeBlanc; Matthew Perry; David Schwimmer
- No. of episodes: 24

Release
- Original network: NBC
- Original release: September 27, 2001 – May 16, 2002

Season chronology
- ← Previous; Season 7 Next → Season 9

The eighth season of the American television sitcom Friends aired on NBC from September 27, 2001 to May 16, 2002.

== Cast and characters ==
=== Main cast ===
- Jennifer Aniston as Rachel Green
- Courteney Cox as Monica Geller Bing
- Lisa Kudrow as Phoebe Buffay
- Matt LeBlanc as Joey Tribbiani
- Matthew Perry as Chandler Bing
- David Schwimmer as Ross Geller

=== Recurring cast ===
- Elliott Gould as Jack Geller
- Christina Pickles as Judy Geller
- Bonnie Somerville as Mona
- Sean Penn as Eric
- James Michael Tyler as Gunther

=== Guest stars ===
- Maggie Wheeler as Janice Litman-Goralnik
- Morgan Fairchild as Nora Bing
- Eddie Cahill as Tag Jones
- Marlo Thomas as Sandra Green
- Ron Leibman as Dr. Leonard Green
- June Gable as Estelle Leonard
- Brad Pitt as Will Colbert
- Trudie Styler as herself
- Johnny Messner as Kash
- Rena Sofer as Katie
- Maurice Godin as Sid
- Eddie McClintock as Clifford 'Cliff' Burnett
- Sam McMurray as Doug
- Geoff Pierson as Mr. Franklin
- Arden Myrin as Brenda
- Fred Stoller as Stu
- Harry Van Gorkum as Don
- James LeGros as Jim
- Cole Sprouse as Ben
- Emily Osment as Lelani Mayolanofavich
- Steve Ireland as Mr. Zelner
- Tim DeKay as Marc
- Rachael Harris as Julie
- Debi Mazar as Evil Bitch

== Episodes ==
No. overall	No. in season	Title	Directed by	Written by	Original release date	Prod. code	U.S. viewers (millions)	Rating/share (18–49)
171	1	"The One After 'I Do'"	Kevin S. Bright	David Crane & Marta Kauffman	September 27, 2001	227401	31.70	15.8/43
Everybody thinks Monica is pregnant, but her denial quickly shifts the focus to Phoebe, who claims she is pregnant to cover for Rachel, the one who is expecting. When Monica realizes it is Rachel, she and Phoebe have her take an additional test to confirm it. Phoebe initially says the new test is "negative" causing Rachel to be sad and disappointed by the different result. Phoebe then says it is positive and that Rachel now knows how she truly feels about having a baby. Chandler surprises Monica by having taken dance lessons for their wedding reception, but his slippery shoes leave him with two left feet. Joey tries to impress Mrs. Bing's date, a Broadway director. Ross meets a beautiful woman named Mona at the reception. He switches his seating number to her table, but mixing up the number, he ends up at the children's, then has to dance with the little girls, which impresses Mona. Special appearance: Elliott Gould as Jack Geller Note: This episode is dedicated to "The people of New York City" in remembrance of the September 11 attacks which happened just 16 days before.
172	2	"The One with the Red Sweater"	David Schwimmer	Dana Klein Borkow	October 4, 2001	227402	30.04	14.7/41
Rachel refuses to reveal who the baby's father is until after she tells him. Joey tells Monica and Phoebe about an unknown guy who slept with Rachel a few weeks earlier and who left a red sweater behind. Phoebe thinks it is Tag Jones' sweater and arranges a meeting between him and Rachel. Ross and Chandler attempt to recreate the wedding reception pictures, after Chandler loses the disposable cameras. Monica opens all the wedding presents without waiting for Chandler. Monica, Joey, and Phoebe learn that Tag is not the father of Rachel's baby. As they are still pondering the mystery, Ross arrives and retrieves his "lost" red sweater, unaware of its significance.
173	3	"The One Where Rachel Tells..."	Sheldon Epps	Sherry Bilsing & Ellen Plummer	October 11, 2001	227403	29.20	15.4/34
Chandler and Monica are about to leave for their honeymoon as Rachel prepares to tell Ross they are having a baby. Phoebe and Joey try to get into Monica and Chandler's apartment by telling Mr. Treeger there is a gas leak. However, Treeger, who could not find the spare key, instead calls firefighters who break down the door. Note: There was a subplot of Chandler and Monica's honeymoon that was filmed but ultimately never aired. It involved Chandler joking about bombs while about to board the plane, leading Airport security to take it as a real threat and interrogating him and Monica. They are eventually determined not to be a threat, but shortly after being released, Joey calls Monica and pretends there is a gas leak in their apartment to cover for the already broken door. When Joey asked about being charged for the damaged door, she sarcastically replied, "No, I want you to stand there and wait for the entire place to blow up!", causing the authorities to re-interrogate the couple. Following the September 11 attacks, the writers felt the humor of this subplot was off color and quickly replaced it with another story about Chandler and Monica becoming jealous over another newlywed couple who got free perks by arriving just before they did. The cut scenes from this episode were later shown as a special feature on the 2004 UK version of the DVDs.
174	4	"The One with the Videotape"	Kevin S. Bright	Scott Silveri	October 18, 2001	227406	25.58	12.2/32
Ross and Rachel argue over who initiated their sexual encounter that led to Rachel's pregnancy. Everyone is positive Ross was the instigator, but Ross claims it was Rachel. To prove it, he reveals how he accidentally videotaped their encounter; while he was videotaping himself practicing giving a speech, Rachel arrived. Everyone watches the tape that shows Rachel used Joey's contrived "Backpacking in western Europe that leads to having sex" story as a come-on to Ross. Monica and Chandler look forward to socializing with another newlywed couple they met on their honeymoon, only to discover the couple has blown them off with a fake phone number.
175	5	"The One with Rachel's Date"	Gary Halvorson	Brian Buckner & Sebastian Jones	October 25, 2001	227404	25.64	12.5/33
Phoebe dates a guy who works for Monica, causing a problem when Phoebe wants to dump him on the same day Monica plans to fire him. Chandler's co-worker thinks his name is Toby. Rachel goes on a date with Joey's costar, Kash (Johnny Messner) despite being pregnant, and much to Ross' annoyance. Ross meets Mona again while at the coffee shop. Note: This episode is dedicated to the memory of Richard Cox Sr., father of Courteney Cox.
176	6	"The One with the Halloween Party"	Gary Halvorson	Mark Kunerth	November 1, 2001	227405	26.96	13.5/33
At Monica and Chandler's Halloween party, Phoebe runs into her sister's fiance, Eric (Sean Penn). Phoebe becomes attracted to him as they bond over Ursula's lies and bad behavior. Ross and Chandler arm wrestle ineffectually. Ross laments that his goofy "Spudnik" outfit makes him look like feces. Rachel, feeling maternal, asks to hand out the candy to trick-or-treaters, only to realize she is less maternal as she thought. Special Guest: Sean Penn as Eric
177	7	"The One with the Stain"	Kevin S. Bright	R. Lee Fleming Jr.	November 8, 2001	227407	24.24	12.1/30
Chandler hires a maid to help Monica, but she soon suspects the maid is stealing her clothes. After getting Chandler to inspect a pair of jeans she is wearing that she thinks are hers, Rachel returns Monica's borrowed clothes. The maid quits, believing Chandler is a pervert. Eric wants to date Phoebe, but he is too reminded of Ursula. Ross attempts to secure the apartment of a dying Dutch woman for Rachel, while Joey wants Rachel to continue living with him. Special Guest: Sean Penn as Eric Note: This episode is dedicated to the memory of Pearl Harmon, great-grandmother of Matt LeBlanc.
178	8	"The One with the Stripper"	David Schwimmer	Andrew Reich & Ted Cohen	November 15, 2001	227408	26.54	12.6/33
Rachel has dinner with her dad to tell him she is pregnant, but intimidated by him, she lies and says Ross is un-supportive. Dr. Green then threatens Ross which nearly ruins his budding romance with Mona. Meanwhile, Monica hires a stripper for Chandler who never got to have a bachelor party, unaware the woman is actually a hooker.
179	9	"The One with the Rumor"	Gary Halvorson	Shana Goldberg-Meehan	November 22, 2001	227410	24.24	11.1/31
Monica invites a high school friend, Will (Brad Pitt) to her Thanksgiving dinner. Rachel finds out that Ross and Will (who was fat and is now slim and gorgeous) started a rumor during their senior year about Rachel having both male and female "reproductive parts". Joey tries protecting the Tribbiani "family legacy" by eating an entire turkey. Chandler and Phoebe sit on the couch, watching a game to avoid helping Monica with the dinner clean up. Special Guest: Brad Pitt as Will. Pitt was Jennifer's husband at the time.
180	10	"The One with Monica's Boots"	Kevin S. Bright	Story by : Robert Carlock; Teleplay by : Brian Buckner & Sebastian Jones	December 6, 2001	227409	22.44	10.6/29
Chandler disapproves when Monica buys expensive boots but she promises to wear them all the time. She is then afraid to tell him how much they hurt her feet. Joey's youngest sister, Deena (Marla Sokoloff) seeks Rachel's advice after becoming pregnant. When Phoebe learns that Sting's son is in Ben's class, she pretends to be Ben's mother to meet Sting's wife (real wife, Trudie Styler) and get tickets to Sting's concert.
181	11	"The One with Ross's Step Forward"	Gary Halvorson	Robert Carlock	December 13, 2001	227411	23.85	11.4/32
Ross is uncomfortable when Mona wants to send out joint Christmas cards and wants to have "the talk". Chandler tries to get out of spending time with his boss. Rachel's pregnancy hormones leave her "erotically charged", or as Phoebe calls it, the "Evander Holyfield" phase.
182	12	"The One Where Joey Dates Rachel"	David Schwimmer	Sherry Bilsing-Graham & Ellen Plummer	January 10, 2002	227412	25.53	12.8/30
Rachel is sad she can no longer date due to her pregnancy. Joey takes her out to cheer her up, but he develops a crush on her, something that scares him. Monica and Chandler get a Ms. Pac-Man arcade game from Phoebe as a late wedding present. After Phoebe hogs the game, Chandler becomes a pro by repeatedly playing and putting swear words as his initials. Monica wants them removed as Ben will be coming over to play on it. After Ross gets to teach an advanced class, he struggles to get there on time. Note: This episode marks the final appearance of Ben (Cole Sprouse).
183	13	"The One Where Chandler Takes a Bath"	Ben Weiss	Vanessa McCarthy	January 17, 2002	227413	29.24	14.1/35
Chandler's dislikes bubble baths but Monica sways him and he soon becomes addicted. Phoebe, who thinks Joey has a crush on her, is shocked that he actually likes Rachel; Ross and Rachel debate over potential baby names and learn the baby's sex.
184	14	"The One with the Secret Closet"	Kevin S. Bright	Brian Buckner & Sebastian Jones	January 31, 2002	227414	28.64	14.2/37
Chandler becomes obsessed with finding out what is inside Monica's locked closet. Phoebe feels betrayed when she discovers Monica has been using a different massage therapist. Ross feels left out after missing their baby's first kick especially when Joey is mistaken for the father. Joey, feeling bad about the situation, suggests that Rachel should move in with Ross even though he wants Rachel to live with him.
185	15	"The One with the Birthing Video"	Kevin S. Bright	Dana Klein Borkow	February 7, 2002	227415	28.64	14.5/37
Phoebe gives a birthing video to Rachel. Chandler, mistaking the tape for porn, watches it and is horrified after watching it with Monica, which kills the mood for Valentine's Day. Ross struggles to tell Mona that Rachel is now living with him; she breaks up with him over his dishonesty. Joey is depressed so Phoebe lends him a dog to cheer him up. However, Joey ends up affecting the dog with his depression. In the end, he tells Ross about his feelings for Rachel.
186	16	"The One Where Joey Tells Rachel"	Ben Weiss	Andrew Reich & Ted Cohen	February 28, 2002	227416	27.52	13.2/33
Ross, shocked at Joey's declaration, avoids him, but eventually convinces him to tell Rachel. Joey confesses his love for Rachel, but Rachel politely and lovingly turns him down. Phoebe is convinced that a British man called Don is Monica's soulmate.
187	17	"The One with the Tea Leaves"	Gary Halvorson	Story by : R. Lee Fleming Jr. Teleplay by : Steven Rosenhaus	March 7, 2002	227417	26.30	12.4/32
Phoebe determines through tea leaves that she will soon meet the man of her dreams. This leads to a disastrous date with a disturbing man, then a pleasant meeting with a charming one at the dry cleaners. Rachel invents a crazy work problem to reduce the awkwardness of hanging out with Joey since his confession about his feelings for her. Ross tries to retrieve his 'faded salmon' shirt from Mona's apartment. Monica and Chandler sort CDs. Special Guest: Alec Baldwin as Parker Note: In spite of the 9/11 attacks having occurred the prior September, a brief shot of the Twin Towers is visible approximately six minutes into the episode.
188	18	"The One in Massapequa"	Gary Halvorson	Story by : Peter Tibbals; Teleplay by : Mark Kunerth	March 28, 2002	227418	22.05	10.5/30
Monica botches an attempt at giving a heartfelt speech for her parents' 35th anniversary party. Phoebe dates Parker (Alec Baldwin), who is overly-enthusiastic about everything which ultimately annoys the entire group, including herself. Ross and Rachel have to pretend they are married while at the Geller's anniversary party; Ross' "wedding toast" stirs feelings in Rachel. Special Guest: Alec Baldwin as Parker
189	19	"The One with Joey's Interview"	Gary Halvorson	Doty Abrams	April 4, 2002	227424	22.59	11.3/30
Joey prepares for an interview with Soap Opera Digest, although he's afraid of saying something stupid that may jeopardize his career. (In a previous episode, in an interview, he said he writes a lot of his own lines, which led to his firing from Days of Our Lives.) Joey enlists his friends to make sure things go well. This is the fourth of Friends' six clip shows.
190	20	"The One with the Baby Shower"	Kevin S. Bright	Sherry Bilsing-Graham & Ellen Plummer	April 25, 2002	227421	22.24	10.7/29
Phoebe and Monica prepare for Rachel's baby shower and forget to invite Rachel's mother. During the shower, Monica tries desperately to seek forgiveness from Sandra, but to no avail. Rachel realizes she has no idea how to look after the baby after the birth, so her mother insists on staying with her for eight weeks, much to her and Ross' annoyance. Ross eventually gives Rachel the confidence to be a mom and Monica lets Sandra know she's furious at her spitefulness. Joey auditions for a job as a host for a new game show called Bamboozled that makes absolutely no sense, and Chandler and Ross help him practice. Special Guest: Marlo Thomas as Sandra Green
191	21	"The One with the Cooking Class"	Gary Halvorson	Story by : Dana Klein Borkow; Teleplay by : Brian Buckner & Sebastian Jones	May 2, 2002	227419	23.97	11.7/32
Monica's cooking skills get a bad review in The Post. After confronting the critic who wrote it, she decides to join a cooking class, with Joey in tow. Rachel gets jealous when Ross meets a girl who flirts with him at the baby department store. Phoebe helps Chandler prepare for an interview by stopping his natural instinct to make immature jokes.
192	22	"The One Where Rachel Is Late"	Gary Halvorson	Shana Goldberg-Meehan	May 9, 2002	227420	24.32	11.7/33
Joey invites Chandler to his movie's premiere but Chandler falls asleep during it. Rachel is very frustrated with the fact that she's eight days late and will try anything to induce labor (including having sex with Ross), which leads to a bet between Monica and Phoebe. Rachel goes into labor at the end of the episode.
193	23	"The One Where Rachel Has a Baby"	Kevin S. Bright	Scott Silveri	May 16, 2002 (Note: These episodes originally aired as a single double-length episode but are sometimes split into two episodes for syndication, reruns and DVD presentation.)	227422	34.91	17.0/44
194	24	"The One Where Rachel Has a Baby"	Kevin S. Bright	Marta Kauffman & David Crane	May 16, 2002	227423	34.91	17.0/44
Ross and Rachel arrive frantically at the hospital and are taken into a semi-private labor room. Ross's mother gives him a family heirloom ring and encourages him to propose to Rachel. Ross hesitates, and puts the ring in his jacket, which he later leaves in Rachel's room. After Monica jokes about having kids, she and Chandler decide to have a baby, starting while they are still at the hospital. They end up having sex in a closet. After a prolonged labor (of 21 hours), during which numerous other expectant mothers, including Janice, are taken to the delivery room, Rachel gives birth to baby Emma. She is left saddened and afraid after Janice later says that Ross may not always be there for her and the baby. When Joey comforts Rachel, the ring falls from Ross's jacket to the floor. Joey kneels to pick it up, and Rachel, believing he is proposing, impulsively says yes. Meanwhile, Ross intends to ask Rachel if she wants to resume their relationship.

== United States ratings ==
Season 8 averaged 24.5 million viewers and finished, for the first time, as the most watched show of the 2001–02 television season.

== Home media ==
The eighth season was officially released on DVD in region 1 on November 9, 2004, as a 4-disc DVD Box Set. The release includes the extended versions of every episode, 3 audio commentaries, a video guide to season eight's guest stars, a gag reel, a trivia challenge, and easter eggs about the next season.

The 2004 region 2 DVD version of the season, include the deleted scenes from the episode "The One Where Rachel Tells Ross" as part of the special features, those scenes were cut from the episode following the September 11 attacks and where not shown to the public until the release of this DVD. The Blu-ray releases of the Complete Series include the "Original Producer's Cut" version of the episode presented on Standard Definition as part of the Exclusive Bonus Features of the set; the original script for the episode was also included.

Friends: The Complete Eight Season
Set Details		Special Features
23 episodes (1 double-length episode); 4-disc set; English (Dolby 5.0 Surround); English, French & Spanish subtitles; Audio Commentaries; 563 minutes (DVD); 527 minutes (Blu-ray)		Over 40 minutes of Never-Before-Seen footage included on every episode (DVD Only); Producers Commentary on 3 episodes: "The One where Rachel Tells Ross", "The One with the Videotape" and "The One Where Rachel Has a Baby"; Friends of Friends: Video Guestbook; Gag Reel; Joey's Game Show Challenge (DVD Only) (Note: Not available on the 2019 re-release of the DVD's); Gunther Spills the Beans About Next Season: Season 9 Easter Eggs; The Original Producer's Cut for "The One Where Rachel Tells Ross" (Blu-ray Only); The Original Script for "The One Where Rachel Tells Ross" (Blu-ray Only)
Release Dates
Region 1	Region 2	Region 4
November 9, 2004	October 25, 2004	October 4, 2006

== Reception ==
Collider ranked the season Number 1 on their ranking of all ten Friends seasons, and named "The One with the Rumor" as its standout episode.
