= Friends season 9 =

Season of television series

Friends
- Season 9
- Friends season 9 DVD cover
- Showrunners: David Crane; Marta Kauffman
- Starring: Jennifer Aniston; Courteney Cox; Lisa Kudrow; Matt LeBlanc; Matthew Perry; David Schwimmer
- No. of episodes: 24

Release
- Original network: NBC
- Original release: September 26, 2002 – May 15, 2003

Season chronology
- ← Previous; Season 8 Next → Season 10

The ninth season of the American television sitcom Friends aired on NBC from September 26, 2002, to May 15, 2003.

== Cast and characters ==
=== Main cast ===
- Jennifer Aniston as Rachel Green
- Courteney Cox Arquette as Monica Geller
- Lisa Kudrow as Phoebe Buffay
- Matt LeBlanc as Joey Tribbiani
- Matthew Perry as Chandler Bing
- David Schwimmer as Ross Geller

=== Recurring cast ===
- Paul Rudd as Mike Hannigan
- Hank Azaria as David
- Aisha Tyler as Charlie Wheeler
- Dermot Mulroney as Gavin Mitchell
- Phill Lewis as Steve
- Melissa George as Molly
- James Michael Tyler as Gunther

=== Guest stars ===
- Maggie Wheeler as Janice Litman-Goralnik
- Elliott Gould as Jack Geller
- Christina Pickles as Judy Geller
- Christina Applegate as Amy Green
- Freddie Prinze Jr. as Sandy
- Selma Blair as Wendy
- John Stamos as Zack
- Jeff Goldblum as Leonard Hayes
- Cleo King as Nurse Kitty
- Janet Hubert as Ms. McKenna
- Kyle Gass as Lowell the Mugger
- Dedee Pfeiffer as Mary Ellen
- Elaine Hendrix as Sally
- Gregory Itzin as Theodore Hannigan
- Cristine Rose as Bitsy Hannigan

== Episodes ==
No. overall	No. in season	Title	Directed by	Written by	Original release date	Prod. code	U.S. viewers (millions)	Rating/share (18–49)
195	1	"The One Where No One Proposes"	Kevin S. Bright	Sherry Bilsing-Graham & Ellen Plummer	September 26, 2002	175251	34.01	16.6/42
After Rachel mistakenly thinks Joey proposed, he tries to explain that it was a misunderstanding, but has difficulty finding an opportune moment. Meanwhile, Monica and Chandler continue trying for a baby, while Ross, unaware that Joey has proposed to Rachel, plans to ask her if she wants to resume their relationship.
196	2	"The One Where Emma Cries"	Sheldon Epps	Dana Klein Borkow	October 3, 2002	175252	28.93	14.7/38
Rachel is unable to get Emma to stop crying after waking her. Chandler falls asleep at a staff meeting and upon waking, accidentally agrees to relocate to Tulsa. Meanwhile, Joey and Ross end up in the hospital after Ross, still angry at Joey for proposing to Rachel, attempted to slug Joey, missing him and hitting the coffeehouse pole instead.
197	3	"The One with the Pediatrician"	Roger Christiansen	Brian Buckner & Sebastian Jones	October 10, 2002	175254	26.63	12.7/33
Monica is offered a great job in New York City and Chandler, unable to get out of moving to Tulsa, is forced to commute back and forth between the two cities. Phoebe and Joey set each other up on blind dates. Joey finds a complete stranger named Mike (Paul Rudd) for Phoebe's date. Rachel's pediatrician, Dr. Weiner, drops her due to her obsessive phone calls. She then takes Emma to Dr. Gettleman, Ross and Monica's pediatrician as children, but learns that Ross is still his patient. Note: This is Paul Rudd's first appearance as Mike Hannigan.
198	4	"The One with the Sharks"	Ben Weiss	Andrew Reich & Ted Cohen	October 17, 2002	175253	25.81	12.7/34
Monica visits Chandler in Tulsa, surprising him while he is watching porn in his hotel room. In a panic, he switches on a shark documentary, leading Monica to believe that sea creatures turn him on. Joey thinks he has already slept with the girl he is dating. Phoebe fears losing Mike, after Ross tells him she has never had a long-term relationship. To make amends, Ross talks to Mike, but makes up a story that Phoebe had a six-year long relationship with an East Indian man named Vikram.
199	5	"The One with Phoebe's Birthday Dinner"	David Schwimmer	Scott Silveri	October 31, 2002	175255	24.46	11.8/32
The gang is celebrating Phoebe's birthday at a fancy restaurant, but only she and Joey are on time: Monica finds out Chandler smoked with his colleagues in Tulsa and gets into a fight with him, which later ends up with her tricking him into having sex with her since she is ovulating; Ross and Rachel get locked outside their apartment with Emma inside and frantically try to get back in. When everyone finally makes it to dinner, Phoebe then leaves to meet Mike when he finishes work early. Then, Ross and Rachel take Emma back home after their "babysitter", Ross' mother Judy who accompanied them after Rachel got separation anxiety, pays more attention to the drinks at the bar than their daughter. Chandler and Monica leave to have sex since she is still ovulating. Only Joey stays to eat everyone's dinners.
200	6	"The One with the Male Nanny"^{†}	Kevin S. Bright	David Crane & Marta Kauffman	November 7, 2002	175256	27.51	13.4/35
Ross and Rachel hire Sandy (Freddie Prinze Jr.), a male nanny. Even though Sandy says he is straight, Ross finds him a bit feminine and does not like the influence he has on, not only Rachel, but Joey as well. After finding out that Sandy plays the recorder, can bake and does puppet shows, Ross fires him. Sandy does not take it badly, and instead comforts Ross about his childhood which involved bad memories of his father Jack. Chandler, while in Tulsa, freaks out when Monica tells him that a man in her restaurant called Jeffrey is the funniest man she has ever met. Shocked, he returns to Manhattan and desperately tries to make Monica laugh but to no avail. After confiding in Joey about this, Chandler did not expect that Joey would go and tell Monica and Ross. The three try to make him feel better and Monica even lies by saying that Jeffrey made a really sexist joke when, in fact, Jeffrey made everybody laugh really hard. Meanwhile, Phoebe and Mike exchange keys, advancing their relationship further. Phoebe's ex-boyfriend David (Hank Azaria) returns to New York for a meeting and comes to her apartment. A talk between the two of them enters into a romantic area when Phoebe hesitates to say that she is currently in a relationship. Then, after a talk with Monica, Phoebe admits to David that she is dating Mike and he agrees not to restart their relationship, but they end up kissing before Mike enters her apartment. Shocked at first, Mike forgives Phoebe once she tells him the entire story and David leaves. Note: This is the longest episode of Friends (apart from the two-part ones), running 31:56. This is also the 200th episode. Special Guest: Hank Azaria as David & Paul Rudd as Mike
201	7	"The One with Ross' Inappropriate Song"	Gary Halvorson	Robert Carlock	November 14, 2002	175257	25.35	12.1/32
Rachel is jealous that Ross can make Emma laugh by singing "Baby Got Back". Phoebe meets Mike's affluent parents and tries impressing them with a snobbish accent. Chandler and Joey find a videotape in Richard's apartment with Monica's name on it. Special Guest: Paul Rudd as Mike
202	8	"The One with Rachel's Other Sister"	Kevin S. Bright	Shana Goldberg-Meehan	November 21, 2002	175258	26.76	12.5/32
Rachel's sister Amy (Christina Applegate) unexpectedly shows up at Thanksgiving, so Rachel invites her to join the gang for dinner. Meeting Emma prompts Amy to bizarrely raise the question of Emma's custody if, hypothetically, Rachel and Ross were both to die. Rachel and Ross's answer upsets both Amy and Chandler. Meanwhile, Monica is acutely anxious about their expensive china plates they are using for the first time, and Phoebe tries to coach Joey how to lie convincingly, after Joey forgets to go to the Thanksgiving parade for Days of Our Lives. Special Guest: Christina Applegate as Amy
203	9	"The One with Rachel's Phone Number"	Ben Weiss	Mark Kunerth	December 5, 2002	175259	25.43	12.1/30
On a girls' night out with Phoebe, Rachel gives a guy her phone number, but instantly regrets it after realizing she would need to move on from Ross. Joey thinks Monica is having an affair when Chandler claims he needs to work, as he does not want to lie to Joey about wanting to spend time with Monica rather than going to a game with him. While Phoebe and Rachel are out, Ross invites Mike to hang out, but they struggle to find something to talk about. Special Guest: Paul Rudd as Mike
204	10	"The One with Christmas in Tulsa"	Kevin S. Bright	Doty Abrams	December 12, 2002	175260	22.29	10.3/29
Chandler, stuck in Tulsa on Christmas Eve, notices the low morale in the meeting he is in and sends all his colleagues back to their homes. However, a female co-worker Wendy (Selma Blair) stays back with him after angering the insurance workers. While talking to Monica, he notices that she is becoming paranoid of Wendy and thinks that he is cheating on her. After convincing her that there is nothing going on between him and Wendy, Chandler ends the call, only for Wendy to make a pass at him. Having had enough, he quits his job and makes it home to Monica and his friends in time for Christmas. [This story serves as a framing device for the fifth of Friends' six clip shows.] Special Guest: Selma Blair as Wendy
205	11	"The One Where Rachel Goes Back to Work"	Gary Halvorson	Story by : Judd Rubin; Teleplay by : Peter Tibbals	January 9, 2003	175261	23.67	11.5/30
Rachel returns from maternity leave early when she fears the temp Ralph Lauren hired as her replacement might be given her job permanently. Meanwhile, Joey helps Phoebe out by convincing the Days of Our Lives director to hire her as an extra on the show, but it ends up being a disaster. Special Guest: Dermot Mulroney as Gavin
206	12	"The One with Phoebe's Rats"	Ben Weiss	Story by : Dana Klein Borkow; Teleplay by : Brian Buckner & Sebastian Jones	January 16, 2003	175262	23.66	11.2/29
Phoebe adopts an orphaned rat family. Ross and Rachel hire a new nanny – Molly (Melissa George), but Ross becomes concerned when Joey starts hitting on her. He is relieved to discover Molly is a lesbian, but Joey is more encouraged. Rachel continues quarreling with Gavin, but when he arrives with a gift for her at her birthday party, they kiss on Monica and Chandler's balcony; unbeknownst to her, Ross, caring for Emma, sees them. Guest stars: Paul Rudd as Mike & Dermot Mulroney as Gavin
207	13	"The One Where Monica Sings"^{†}	Gary Halvorson	Story by : Sherry Bilsing-Graham & Ellen Plummer; Teleplay by : Steven Rosenhaus	January 30, 2003	175263	25.82	12.2/31
Phoebe urges Monica to sing at Mike's piano bar. The audience loves her but this may be because the spotlight reveals she is not wearing a bra under her see-through blouse. Meanwhile, an angry Ross is thinking Rachel is moving on without telling him, so her tries to find a date, eventually taking home a woman who just broke up with her boyfriend. Rachel arrives, wanting to talk with Ross, and after a big argument, she takes Emma and moves back in with Joey. Special Guest: Paul Rudd as Mike & Dermot Mulroney as Gavin Note: This episode lasts for 30 minutes rather than the usual 22-23 minutes.
208	14	"The One with the Blind Dates"	Gary Halvorson	Sherry Bilsing-Graham & Ellen Plummer	February 6, 2003	175265	23.37	11.1/28
To get Ross and Rachel to realize they are perfect for each other, Phoebe and Joey set them up on bad blind dates: Phoebe sets Rachel up with a unpaid shirt-maker who criticises himself and tries to make others feel pity for him while Joey, accidentally finding Ross "his perfect woman", tells the date that it is off, making Ross think that the date stood him up. At the end of the episode, Ross and Rachel come to the conclusion that Phoebe and Joey intentionally set them up on bad blind dates and the episode ends with Ross and Rachel chasing Joey and Phoebe out of Central Perk. Meanwhile, Monica and Chandler babysit Emma, but when Monica realises she miscounted the dates she is ovulating, the couple hurriedly run off to the next room to have sex, oblivious to baby Emma. Joey hears them having sex and, shocked, takes Emma out of the apartment. Special appearance by Jon Lovitz as Steve
209	15	"The One with the Mugging"	Gary Halvorson	Peter Tibbals	February 13, 2003	175264	20.85	9.5/27
Phoebe and Ross get mugged by one of Phoebe's old friends from the street (Kyle Gass), but when her friend recognises her, he lets them go. Ross then finds out that Phoebe was the person who mugged him when he was a teenager and stole his original comic book "Science Boy". Meanwhile, Chandler lands an unpaid advertising internship, but feels out of place due to his age after seeing that the other interns are teenagers. Joey auditions for a Broadway play starring Leonard Hayes (Jeff Goldblum), but must go to painful extremes (including holding his pee inside for hours at a stretch) to get the part after Hayes says that he is not acting urgently. Special guest: Jeff Goldblum as Leonard Hayes & Phill Lewis as Steve
210	16	"The One with the Boob Job"	Gary Halvorson	Mark Kunerth	February 20, 2003	175266	19.52	8.8/22
Chandler and Monica separately ask Joey for a loan. When Chandler discovers Monica asked Joey for money, saying Bings never ask for money, Joey claims Monica needed the cash for a boob job. Rachel tries to baby-proof the apartment by herself but realizes she cannot, so she hires a handyman. This results in Joey desperately trying to open the refrigerator and, once he does, taking all the food out so that he does not have to try and open it again. Mike tells Phoebe that he never wants to marry again, which leads Phoebe to question if they should live together. After a heartbreaking decision, Phoebe ends things with Mike after realizing that she does want to get married. Special Guest: Paul Rudd as Mike
211	17	"The One with the Memorial Service"	Gary Halvorson	Story by : Robert Carlock; Teleplay by : Brian Buckner & Sebastian Jones	March 13, 2003	175267	21.00	10.0/27
Ross and Chandler post false information about each other on their college's alumni website, namely that Chandler is gay and Ross is dead. Meanwhile, Joey and Emma fight over Joey's "bedtime penguin pal" Hugsy. Joey desperately tries to get his original Hugsy back, including getting Emma a new one. Phoebe asks Monica to help her get over Mike using any means necessary. Special Guest:' Paul Rudd as Mike
212	18	"The One with the Lottery"	Gary Halvorson	Story by : Brian Buckner & Sebastian Jones; Teleplay by : Sherry Bilsing-Graham & Ellen Plummer	April 3, 2003	175268	20.79	9.8/27
The gang buys lottery tickets and fight over how to divide them up. Chandler waits for a job offer at the advertising agency, while Rachel and Ross anticipate Emma's first word, which ends up being "Gleba". Special guest: Phill Lewis as Steve
213	19	"The One with Rachel's Dream"	Terry Hughes	Story by : Dana Klein Borkow; Teleplay by : Mark Kunerth	April 17, 2003	175269	18.24	8.4/26
After seeing him practice and then film a scene from Days of Our Lives, Rachel develops feelings for Joey. In a dream, she kisses Joey. Phoebe performs street music at Monica's restaurant, much to Monica's dismay. Chandler plans a weekend away in Vermont with Monica, but has to take Ross instead after Monica becomes unavailable. There, Ross becomes high on sugar and suggests they steal all the non-important hotel items after the hotel takes $600 from Chandler. When they do so and attempt to leave, their suitcase becomes loose and everything spills out.
214	20	"The One with the Soap Opera Party"	Sheldon Epps	Story by : Shana Goldberg-Meehan; Teleplay by : Andrew Reich & Ted Cohen	April 24, 2003	175270	20.71	9.9/30
Rachel struggles with her feelings for an oblivious Joey, who holds a Days of Our Lives cast party, but does not want any of his friends to attend. Ross develops a crush on another professor, Charlie (Aisha Tyler), who has only ever dated Nobel Prize winners. He and Rachel catch her and Joey kissing at the party. Guest star: Alex Borstein as the Bitter woman on stage
215	21	"The One with the Fertility Test"^{†}	Gary Halvorson	Story by : Scott Silveri; Teleplay by : Robert Carlock	May 1, 2003	175271	19.03	8.7/27
Chandler and Monica undergo fertility testing and are surprised to encounter Janice. Chandler is afraid of ejaculating in a cup. Once they return, they find out that they can't get pregnant. Meanwhile, Rachel makes an appointment at a massage place. Phoebe tells her the place is horrible and rips up Rachel's certificate. Rachel tapes the certificate back together and goes to the massage place against Phoebe's wishes, but she doesn't know that Phoebe actually works there. In multiple attempts, Phoebe tries to act Swedish and Scottish but Rachel eventually finds out and convinces her to be true to herself. But Phoebe's greed for money gets the best of her and she doesn't quit. Joey needs help advancing in his relationship with Charlie, and turns to Ross for advice. Guest star: Maggie Wheeler as Janice Litman-Goralnik
216	22	"The One with the Donor"	Ben Weiss	Andrew Reich & Ted Cohen	May 8, 2003	175272	19.55	9.3/27
After learning they are reproductively incompatible, Chandler and Monica search for a sperm donor. After interviewing a suitable potential candidate (John Stamos), they decide to adopt instead. Phoebe realizes Rachel's feelings for Joey when she and Rachel take Charlie shopping, and Rachel fears Charlie heard that she likes Joey. Instead, Charlie believes that Phoebe likes Joey and thanks Rachel for convincing her not to make a move. While getting ready to go to Mike's sister's party, Phoebe meets David, the scientist guy, again and does not go to the party, instead going with him for dinner. Ross has an interview for a conference in Barbados. Guest stars: Hank Azaria as David & John Stamos as Zack
217	23	"The One in Barbados"	Kevin S. Bright	Shana Goldberg-Meehan & Scott Silveri	May 15, 2003 (Note: These episodes originally aired as a single double-length episode but are sometimes split into two episodes for syndication, reruns and DVD presentation.)	175273	25.46	12.4/36
218	24	"The One in Barbados"	Kevin S. Bright	Marta Kauffman & David Crane	May 15, 2003	175274	25.46	12.4/36
The gang goes to Barbados for Ross' conference, where Monica's hair becomes frizzy due to the humidity. David (Hank Azaria), Phoebe's "scientist guy", almost proposes – but her ex-boyfriend Mike proposes first. Phoebe rejects both proposals, but ends up choosing Mike. Monica and Mike play a very competitive game of ping-pong, which displeases Chandler and turns Phoebe on. Mike and Monica trash-talk each other and tie at 41-41 when Monica injures her hand. Chandler agrees to play in her place, but Monica complains that he is bad at the game. However, Chandler surprises her by showing his secretly adept skills and beats Mike in the sudden death round. Ross and Charlie find they have a lot in common, while Rachel and Joey grow closer. Joey and Charlie realize they have little in common and decide to break up. Rachel admits to Joey that she likes him romantically. Despite finally getting a chance to be with Rachel, Joey refuses out of respect for Ross. When he sees Charlie and Ross kissing, though, he heads back to Rachel's room and kisses her.

^† denotes a "super-sized" episode, with a running time of 31:56 (excluding advertisement breaks).

== United States ratings ==
Season 9 averaged 21.6 million viewers and finished as the second most watched show in the 2002–03 television season.

== Home media ==
The ninth season was officially released on DVD in region 1 on March 8, 2005, as a 4-disc DVD Box Set. The release includes the extended versions of every episode, 3 audio commentaries, a closer look at the style of the series, a gag reel, a music video, a trivia challenge and Easter Eggs about the final season.

Season 9 was released on Blu-ray altogether with the rest of the series on the Complete Series releases; and as part of the special features the set include the original "super-sized" broadcast versions of several episodes from seasons 7, 9 & 10 apart from the original broadcast versions of every episode; the episodes from seasons 9 & 10 are presented in High Definition, while the ones from season 7 are presented in Standard Definition.

Friends: The Complete Ninth Season
Set Details		Special Features
23 episodes (1 double-length episode); 4-disc set (DVD)/2 Discs (Blu-ray); English (Dolby 5.0 Surround) (DVD)/English (Dolby Digital 5.1) (Blu-ray); English, French & Spanish subtitles; Audio Commentaries; 620 minutes		Over 44 minutes of Never-Before-Seen footage included on every episode (DVD Only); Producers Commentary on 3 episodes: "The One with the Male Nanny", "The One with Rachel's Other Sister" and "The One in Barbados"; Behind the Style: The Look of Friends; Gag Reel; Flaming Lips Phoebe Battles the Pink Robots - Music Video; Who's Your Best Friend: Trivia Challenge (DVD Only) (Note: Not available on the 2019 re-release of the DVD's); Gunther Spills the Beans About the Final Season: Season 10 Easter Eggs; Extended Full-Length Cut of "The One in Barbados" (Blu-ray Only); Original "Super-Sized" broadcast of several episodes in High-Definition (Blu-ray Only)
Release Dates
Region 1	Region 2	Region 4
March 8, 2005	October 25, 2004	October 4, 2006

== Reception ==
Collider ranked the season Number 10 on their ranking of all ten Friends seasons, and named "The One with Rachel's Other Sister" as its standout episode.
