= Friends season 6 =

Season of television series

Friends
- Season 6
- Friends season 6 DVD cover
- Showrunners: David Crane; Marta Kauffman
- Starring: Jennifer Aniston; Courteney Cox Arquette; Lisa Kudrow; Matt LeBlanc; Matthew Perry; David Schwimmer
- No. of episodes: 25

Release
- Original network: NBC
- Original release: September 23, 1999 – May 18, 2000

Season chronology
- ← Previous; Season 5 Next → Season 7

The sixth season of the American television sitcom Friends aired on NBC from September 23, 1999 to May 18, 2000.

== Cast and characters ==
=== Main cast ===
- Jennifer Aniston as Rachel Green
- Courteney Cox Arquette as Monica Geller
- Lisa Kudrow as Phoebe Buffay
- Matt LeBlanc as Joey Tribbiani
- Matthew Perry as Chandler Bing
- David Schwimmer as Ross Geller

=== Recurring cast ===
- Elle Macpherson as Janine LaCroix
- Alexandra Holden as Elizabeth Stevens
- Bruce Willis as Paul Stevens
- Reese Witherspoon as Jill Green
- Tom Selleck as Richard Burke
- James Michael Tyler as Gunther
- Ron Glass as Russell, the divorce lawyer

=== Guest stars ===
- Elliott Gould as Jack Geller
- Christina Pickles as Judy Geller
- June Gable as Estelle Leonard
- Jane Sibbett as Carol Willick Bunch
- Jessica Hecht as Susan Bunch
- Conchata Ferrell as the judge
- Ralph Lauren as himself
- Joanna Gleason as Kim
- Missi Pyle as Hillary
- Kristian Alfonso as Hope Brady
- Mitchell Whitfield as Barry
- Paul Gleason as Jack
- Pat Finn as Dr. Roger
- Louis Mandylor as Carl
- Oliver Muirhead as the jeweller
- Brian Dunkleman as the customer
- Cheryl Hines as Woman #2

== Episodes ==
No. overall	No. in season	Title	Directed by	Written by	Original release date	Prod. code	U.S. viewers (millions)	Rating/share (18–49)
122	1	"The One After Vegas"	Kevin S. Bright	Adam Chase	September 23, 1999	225551	27.74	15.0/44
In Vegas, Ross and Rachel initially have no memory of getting married the previous night, then must deal with the aftermath of their drunken escapade. Phoebe and Joey drive back to New York in Phoebe's cab. She becomes angry when Joey sleeps most of the way rather than playing his promised fun road trip games; he further unnerves Phoebe by picking up a hitchhiker while she was napping. Back at home, Monica and Chandler ponder the idea of marriage and decide to take their relationship forward a step by living together. Opening Credit Gag: Courteney Cox married David Arquette between seasons 5 and 6 and she changed her last name to Cox-Arquette. As a tribute to them, Courteney Cox Arquette was given top billing for the episode, and "Arquette" was added to every cast member's last name in the opening credits.
123	2	"The One Where Ross Hugs Rachel"	Gail Mancuso	Shana Goldberg-Meehan	September 30, 1999	225552	22.95	11.9/37
Ross promises Rachel to get their Vegas marriage annulled, only to shock Phoebe by confessing he cannot go through with it, unable to handle another failed marriage. Whilst he and Phoebe consult other women to see whether they would date him after three divorces, one of the women hypothesises that Ross is still in love with Rachel, to which Phoebe agrees. Ross adamantly denies this and unsuccessfully attempts to secretly annul the marriage himself. Monica and Chandler announce they are moving in together. Joey reacts badly to the news, though Chandler reassures him their friendship will remain the same. Rachel mistakenly believes all three will be living together until Monica explains Rachel has to move out. Rachel then upsets Monica by her blasé reaction, convinced Monica and Chandler will never go through with it. When Monica assures her they will, Rachel becomes distraught and seeks comfort from Ross, just as he is about to tell her the truth about their marriage.
124	3	"The One with Ross' Denial"	Gary Halvorson	Seth Kurland	October 7, 1999	225553	21.60	11.5/34
Ross denies to Phoebe that he loves Rachel, yet invites her to move in with him, all while Rachel is unaware they are still legally married. Monica flatly dismisses Chandler's idea to turn the spare bedroom into a game room. Chandler claims Monica still considers it only her apartment, resulting in a fight and Ross being the mediator. Meanwhile, Joey has trouble finding a new roommate.
125	4	"The One Where Joey Loses His Insurance"	Gary Halvorson	Andrew Reich & Ted Cohen	October 14, 1999	225554	21.07	11.2/34
Joey's health benefits lapse just as he develops a hernia. Unable to afford treatment and unwilling to borrow the money from Chandler, he takes on an acting role to renew his insurance, during which the hernia helps out with an uncooperative child star. Ross is given a guest professorship at New York University and, eager to impress his students, inexplicably lapses into a fake English accent. While he tries to tone down the accent and pleads with his students to help him get a permanent teaching job at the university, Rachel discovers she and Ross are still married, and charges into his class yelling at him.
126	5	"The One with Joey's Porsche"	Gary Halvorson	Perry Rein & Gigi McCreery	October 21, 1999	225555	22.39	11.5/34
Rachel forces Ross to get the annulment, and as retribution for him lying to her, she fills out the annulment paperwork saying Ross is gay, mentally unstable, and addicted to intravenous drugs. When Ross contests the false information and reveals their previous relationship, the judge (Conchata Ferrell) then disallows an annulment and rules they must obtain a divorce. Ross is miserable, but cheers up when Rachel confesses that getting married was her idea. They share a brief moment of thought, confessing they believed that if they ever got married together it would last. Joey tries to impress girls by pretending to own a Porsche, whose owner left its keys in Central Perk. Phoebe recruits Monica and Chandler to help her babysit the triplets, but Monica takes Chandler to the emergency room when he swallows a toy gun, leaving Phoebe alone.
127	6	"The One on the Last Night"	David Schwimmer	Scott Silveri	November 4, 1999	225556	23.59	12.3/34
On the night before Chandler moves in with Monica, Chandler tries to give Joey money to make sure he has enough for his expenses. When Joey refuses, Chandler invents a game called "Cups" and "loses" the money to Joey, only for Joey to later lose it all to Ross in the same game and then for Chandler to win it back during the credits. Discovering Rachel has not packed, Monica and Phoebe offer to help. When the two girls get emotional, Phoebe suggests they think of the things they will not miss about each other, leading to a massive argument and Rachel refusing to leave.
128	7	"The One Where Phoebe Runs"	Gary Halvorson	Sherry Bilsing-Graham & Ellen Plummer	November 11, 1999	225557	22.75	11.6/31
Rachel moves in with Phoebe. However, Rachel is embarrassed by Phoebe's odd running style and attempts to avoid her during their morning jogs through Central Park. Joey takes in a new roommate: dancer Janine (Elle Macpherson). Chandler wants to impress Monica by cleaning the apartment but panics when he forgets where everything is supposed to go.
129	8	"The One with Ross's Teeth"	Gary Halvorson	Story by : Andrew Reich & Ted Cohen; Teleplay by : Perry Rein & Gigi McCreery	November 18, 1999	225558	22.14	10.8/31
Ross wants to impress an impending date by whitening his teeth but overdoes it. Phoebe may or may not have made out with Ralph Lauren, which gets Rachel into trouble with her boss. Joey picks up some feminine tastes from his new roommate Janine, worrying Chandler.
130	9	"The One Where Ross Got High"	Kevin S. Bright	Gregory S. Malins	November 25, 1999	225559	19.17	8.7/25
Ross is forced to tell Chandler why Jack and Judy dislike him. While in college, Ross experimented with pot and was found out by his parents but he claimed it was Chandler's pot. Rachel makes dessert, but when the recipe book's pages get stuck together, she combines an English trifle with beef sauteed with peas and onions. Phoebe has a sensual dream about Jack Geller, Monica and Ross' father. Joey and Ross want to skip Monica's Thanksgiving dinner after Janine invites them to hang out with her and her dancer friends.
131	10	"The One with the Routine"	Kevin S. Bright	Brian Boyle	December 16, 1999	225560	22.43	10.8/33
Janine is appearing in the pre-recorded Dick Clark's New Year's Rockin' Eve, and invites Joey, Ross, and Monica to participate in the dancing. While there, Joey wants to ensure a kiss with Janine at midnight, while Monica and Ross wrangle their way onto camera by doing "The Routine", their old high school dance. Meanwhile, Phoebe, Chandler, and Rachel search for Monica's Christmas presents so they can buy her something suitable in return.
132	11	"The One with the Apothecary Table"	Kevin S. Bright	Story by : Zachary Rosenblatt; Teleplay by : Brian Boyle	January 6, 2000	225561	22.26	11.0/30
Janine and Joey are finally dating, only for Janine to tell Joey she does not like Monica and Chandler, forcing him to choose. Meanwhile, Rachel buys an apothecary table from Pottery Barn, a store that Phoebe hates, then pretends she bought it at a flea market. Her story is blown when Phoebe sees the same table at Ross' apartment.
133	12	"The One with the Joke"	Gary Halvorson	Story by : Shana Goldberg-Meehan; Teleplay by : Andrew Reich & Ted Cohen	January 13, 2000	225562	22.33	11.4/30
Chandler is upset when Playboy prints Ross' joke; both claim they originated the joke. Meanwhile, Joey reluctantly takes a waiter job at Central Perk. When Gunther fires him when he closes the shop to go to an audition, Rachel defends him. Phoebe says she would choose Rachel over Monica as a girlfriend because Monica is high-maintenance, but also says that Rachel is a pushover, causing tension between the girls.
134	13	"The One with Rachel's Sister"	Gary Halvorson	Story by : Seth Kurland; Teleplay by : Sherry Bilsing-Graham & Ellen Plummer	February 3, 2000	225563	24.14	12.2/34
Joey uses his position as waiter to give all the pretty female customers free things at the coffee house, but quickly gets in trouble with Gunther. Monica refuses to admit she is sick when she catches a cold. Rachel's sister Jill (Reese Witherspoon) shows up after their father financially cuts her off, and she now has to make it on her own.
135	14	"The One Where Chandler Can't Cry"	Kevin S. Bright	Andrew Reich & Ted Cohen	February 10, 2000	225564	23.82	12.1/33
Chandler claims there is little that makes him cry, resulting in the friends trying everything to break him down. A man asks for Phoebe's autograph and then tells Joey that she is a porn star. Phoebe discovers that Ursula is making pornographic movies under Phoebe's name. Phoebe gets her back by having Ursula's paychecks sent to her own address. Ross and Jill begin dating, although it soon becomes clear that Jill's motive is only to spite Rachel.
136	15	"The One That Could Have Been"	Michael Lembeck	Gregory S. Malins & Adam Chase	February 17, 2000 (Note: These episodes originally aired as a single double-length episode but are sometimes split into two episodes for syndication, reruns and DVD presentation.)	225565	25.89	13.7/35
137	16	"The One That Could Have Been"	Michael Lembeck	David Crane & Marta Kauffman	February 17, 2000	225566	25.89	13.7/35
The gang ponders what their lives might have been like if Ross and Carol had stayed married, Monica had never lost weight, Chandler had pursued being a writer, Joey still worked on Days of our Lives, Rachel had married Barry, and Phoebe had become a stockbroker. The story then takes place in an alternate reality. Chandler, struggling to get his writing published, becomes Joey's assistant with mixed results. Monica plans to lose her virginity to her boyfriend, Roger, but Roger's busy schedule interferes; when Chandler attempts to comfort her, they end up in bed together. Ross attempts to spice up his marriage with Carol by suggesting a threesome, leading to his realization that Carol is a lesbian when he is left out of the action. Rachel instantly falls for Joey after seeing him for the first time in Central Perk, and the two nearly have an affair before Rachel discovers Barry is cheating on her. Phoebe loses her firm millions of dollars, lands in the hospital with a stress-induced heart attack and is subsequently fired (which causes her to have a second heart attack); she begins to take musical inspiration from her near-death experiences.
138	17	"The One with Unagi"	Gary Halvorson	Story by : Zachary Rosenblatt; Teleplay by : Adam Chase	February 24, 2000	225567	22.21	11.3/31
Rachel and Phoebe take self-defense classes. Ross, who previously practiced karate, stages a surprise mock attack to convince them they lack unagi, supposedly a state of "total awareness", though unagi is Japanese for eel. Chandler and Monica celebrate Valentine's Day several days late, but when they forget to make each other homemade gifts, Monica gives Chandler one of Phoebe's "sock bunnies". Chandler finds a mixtape in the closet and gives it to Monica, unaware it was a present from Janice, complete with her recorded voice. When Joey applies for an identical twin research project that pays $2,000, he recruits someone to play his "twin".
139	18	"The One Where Ross Dates a Student"	Gary Halvorson	Seth Kurland	March 9, 2000	225568	20.52	10.1/29
Ross dates a student from his paleontology class, fearing it could jeopardize his career, but amusing the friends. Rachel's and Phoebe's apartment catches fire, causing them to move in with Monica and Joey while it is repaired. Rachel initially stays in Monica's plush new guestroom and Phoebe is with Joey. When it is determined that Phoebe's candles did not cause the fire but was actually Rachel's fault, the two switch so that Phoebe gets the nicer room. Rachel finds herself preferring Joey's easygoing nature while Phoebe chafes over Monica's neat-freak ways. Chandler helps Joey get an audition in an upcoming Al Pacino movie.
140	19	"The One with Joey's Fridge"	Ben Weiss	Story by : Seth Kurland; Teleplay by : Gigi McCreery & Perry Rein	March 23, 2000	225569	21.46	10.4/30
Joey's refrigerator breaks, but unable to afford a new one, he tries to con the friends into paying for it. Ross' student girlfriend, Elizabeth, is heading to Miami for spring break, unleashing Ross' paranoia over what she might do there. Meanwhile, Rachel asks Phoebe, Chandler, and Monica to find her a date for the Ralph Lauren Ball, sparking a competition so fierce that when Rachel finds her own date, the three scare him off.
141	20	"The One with Mac and C.H.E.E.S.E."	Kevin S. Bright	Doty Abrams	April 13, 2000	225570	18.81	9.6/31
Joey is up for a role on a low-budget cable TV series, playing the science fiction hero, "Mac" Machiavelli, the crime-fighting partner of a cool robot, C.H.E.E.S.E., which stands for Computerised Humanoid Electronically Enhanced Secret Enforcer. Monica bursts into the apartment, interrupting Chandler as he is writing Joey a note that his second audition has been changed, causing Joey to miss it. The friends reminisce about other instances when they have messed up. Joey gets another audition chance, which Chandler writes down correctly. One of six clip show episodes over the course of 10 seasons.
142	21	"The One Where Ross Meets Elizabeth's Dad"	Michael Lembeck	Story by : David J. Lagana; Teleplay by : Scott Silveri	April 27, 2000	225571	20.63	10.8/32
Ross is nervous meeting Elizabeth's father, Paul (Bruce Willis); Paul dislikes Ross but is interested in Rachel. Joey begins working on Mac and C.H.E.E.S.E. but is openly unimpressed with C.H.E.E.S.E. his robot sidekick, a clumsy, slow-moving machine speaking with a distorted voice piped through a mike. This angers the robot's operator, who has the clout to get Joey fired. Phoebe writes a novel based on Monica and Chandler.
143	22	"The One Where Paul's the Man"	Gary Halvorson	Story by : Brian Caldirola; Teleplay by : Sherry Bilsing-Graham & Ellen Plummer	May 4, 2000	225572	20.01	10.2/33
Paul disapproves of Ross' relationship with Elizabeth and threatens to have him fired unless they break up. Meanwhile, Paul and Rachel begin dating. Ignoring Paul's threats, Ross and Elizabeth sneak away to her family's cabin, unaware Paul and Rachel have the same plan. As a lark, the girls put their names down on a popular wedding venue's long waiting list. When the venue happens to get back to Chandler about a cancellation, he panics and promptly bolts. Monica finds him and assures him it was not a serious reservation, little realizing that Chandler is actually planning to propose.
144	23	"The One with the Ring"	Gary Halvorson	Ted Cohen & Andrew Reich	May 11, 2000	225575	20.87	10.2/34
Phoebe helps Chandler look for an engagement ring. Chandler finds the perfect one but does not have the money with him to purchase it. He leaves Phoebe at the store to hold the ring for him. He returns and finds that Phoebe became distracted and allowed the ring to be sold. He then tries to track down the person who bought it. Meanwhile, Rachel urges Paul to open up emotionally but once started, is unable to stop. So, Rachel breaks up with him. Joey and Ross are upset that it appears Chandler prefers spending time with Phoebe, so they snub him.
145	24	"The One with the Proposal"	Kevin S. Bright	Shana Goldberg-Meehan & Scott Silveri	May 18, 2000	225573	30.73	16.0/44
146	25	"The One with the Proposal"	Kevin S. Bright	Andrew Reich & Ted Cohen	May 18, 2000	225574	30.73	16.0/44
Chandler is about to propose to Monica at a fancy restaurant when Richard suddenly appears with a date and joins them. Wanting his proposal to be a surprise at just the right time, Chandler then pretends he has no interest in marriage. Meanwhile, Ross breaks up with Elizabeth, feeling she is too immature for him. He almost reconsiders until she starts throwing water balloons at him. Joey accidentally buys a sailboat at a silent auction, thinking he won it in a contest. He decides to keep the boat, even though Rachel tries to stop him. Richard, appearing at Monica's workplace, tells her he wants to marry her and have children with her. Chandler has made Monica believe he is uninterested in marriage so she reconsiders their relationship. It appears Monica has left him but she surprises him with her own proposal. She starts but becomes emotional so Chandler finishes finally asking her to marry him. Monica tearfully accepts. The season ends with Chandler and Monica dancing to "Wonderful Tonight" by Eric Clapton and the screen fades to black. Note: This is Tom Selleck's last appearance as Richard.

== Home media ==
Friends: The Complete Sixth Season
Set Details		Special Features
23 episodes (2 double-length episode); 4-disc set (DVD)/2 discs (Blu-ray); English (Dolby 5.0 Surround) (DVD); English (Dolby Digital 5.1) (Blu-ray); English, French & Spanish subtitles; Audio Commentaries; 573 minutes (DVD); 549 minutes (Blu-ray)		Over 25 minutes of Never-Before-Seen footage included on every episode (DVD Only); Producers Commentary on 3 episodes: "The One Where Ross Got High", "The One That Could Have Been" and "The One with the Proposal"; Friends of Friends: Video Guestbook; Gag Reel; Casino Challenge Trivia Quiz (DVD Only) (Note: Not available on the 2019 re-release of the DVD's); Gunther Spills the Beans About Next Season: Season 7 Easter Eggs
Release Dates
Region 1	Region 2	Region 4
January 27, 2004	July 17, 2000	October 4, 2006

== Reception ==
Collider ranked the season Number 5 on their ranking of all ten Friends seasons, and named "The One Where Ross Got High" as its standout episode.
