= Friends: The Reunion =

2021 reunion special of Friends

- Promotional poster
- Based on: Friends by: David Crane; Marta Kauffman
- Directed by: Ben Winston
- Presented by: James Corden
- Starring: Jennifer Aniston; Courteney Cox; Lisa Kudrow; Matt LeBlanc; Matthew Perry; David Schwimmer
- Country of origin: United States
- Original language: English

Production
- Executive producers: Kevin S. Bright; Marta Kauffman; David Crane; Jennifer Aniston; Courteney Cox; Lisa Kudrow; Matt LeBlanc; Matthew Perry; David Schwimmer; Ben Winston
- Running time: 104 minutes
- Production companies: Warner Bros. Unscripted Television; Bright/Kauffman/Crane Productions; Fulwell 73; HBO Max Originals

Original release
- Network: HBO Max
- Release: May 27, 2021

Related
- Friends (1994–2004)

Friends: The Reunion is a 2021 reunion special of the American television sitcom Friends, and the sitcom's first feature-length film. The special was hosted by James Corden and executive produced by the show's cocreators, Marta Kauffman and David Crane, Kevin S. Bright, the show's main cast, and Ben Winston (who also directed the special). The special premiered on HBO Max on May 27, 2021. The special sees the main cast revisit the sets of the original show (such as the Friends' apartments, the Central Perk coffee shop, and the signature water fountain), meet with guests who appeared on the show as well as celebrity guests, do table reads and re-enactments of Friends episodes, and share behind-the-scenes footage. It marked the final on-screen appearances of both James Michael Tyler, who died five months after its release, and Matthew Perry, who died in 2023.

== Production ==
=== Development ===
In November 2019, Warner Bros. Television was developing a Friends reunion special for their new streaming service, HBO Max. The special would feature the whole cast and co-stars. In February 2020, an unscripted Friends was commissioned with all original cast and co-creators returning.

The special was executive produced by the show's co-creators, Kevin S. Bright, Marta Kauffman and David Crane, and the show's main cast, Jennifer Aniston, Courteney Cox, Lisa Kudrow, Matt LeBlanc, Matthew Perry and David Schwimmer. Ben Winston directed and executive produced through Fulwell 73. Warner Bros. Unscripted & Alternative Television (later Warner Horizon Unscripted Television) was also involved in the production of the special.

=== Filming ===
The special was filmed in Burbank, California, at Stage 24, also known as "The Friends Stage" at Warner Bros. Studios, where Friends had been filmed since its second season. The filming of the reunion began in April 2021. Filming of the special was delayed twice, first in March 2020, and second in August 2020.

== Cast ==
=== Main cast ===
- Jennifer Aniston
- Courteney Cox
- Lisa Kudrow
- Matt LeBlanc
- Matthew Perry
- David Schwimmer

=== Original show producers ===
- Kevin S. Bright
- David Crane
- Marta Kauffman

=== Host ===
- James Corden

=== Guest stars ===
- David Beckham
- Justin Bieber (wearing Ross' Spud-nik costume)
- BTS
- Cindy Crawford (wearing Ross' leather pants and buttoned shirt)
- Cara Delevingne (wearing Rachel's maid of honor dress and Ross's Holiday Armadillo costume)
- Soleil Moon Frye (audience guest, who played Katie in "The One with the Girl Who Hits Joey")
- Elliott Gould (audience guest, who played Jack Geller)
- Kit Harington
- Lady Gaga (performing "Smelly Cat" with Kudrow, dressed as Phoebe, and referencing her role in A Star Is Born)
- Larry Hankin (trivia game guest, who played Mr. Heckles)
- Mindy Kaling
- Thomas Lennon (trivia game guest, who played Joey's identical hand twin)
- Christina Pickles (audience guest, who played Judy Geller)
- Tom Selleck (trivia game guest, who played Richard Burke)
- James Michael Tyler (cast interview guest on Zoom, who played Gunther)
- Maggie Wheeler (cast interview guest, who played Janice Litman-Goralnik)
- Reese Witherspoon (who played Jill Green)

The four actors who portrayed the barbershop quartet in "The One With All the Jealousy" appeared in the trivia game segment. Show guest stars Danny DeVito, Ben Stiller, Julia Roberts, Brad Pitt and Sean Penn were mentioned and shown via archive footage. Actor Paul Rudd briefly appeared in the series finale curtain call. Appearances by director James Burrows and comedian Bob Newhart were cut from the special and used as bonus clips in the HBO Max release.

== Release ==
The reunion special was originally set to be released with the launch of HBO Max on May 27, 2020, along with the 236 episodes of the original series that were available at launch; this was delayed a year later due to the COVID-19 pandemic. In May 2021, a teaser trailer was released announcing that the reunion special was scheduled to be released on May 27, 2021, on HBO Max. The HBO Max release includes five bonus clips that were cut from the special as extras.

The special was also released internationally simultaneously with the U.S. release on Crave in Canada, Sky One and NOW in the United Kingdom, Ireland and Italy, Foxtel Now and Binge in Australia, TVNZ 2 and TVNZ OnDemand in New Zealand, ZEE5 in India and Pakistan, OSN in the United Arab Emirates, HBO Go and HBO Asia in Singapore, Malaysia, Indonesia, Vietnam, Thailand, the Philippines, Taiwan and Hong Kong, HBO Nordic in Sweden, Denmark, Norway and Finland, HBO España in Spain and HBO Portugal in Portugal.

In China, the special was streamed on iQIYI, Youku and Tencent Video, although the scenes featuring Lady Gaga, Justin Bieber, and BTS have been removed. LGBTQ references and references to urine in the special were also removed. In Japan, the special was exclusively released on U-NEXT on May 31, 2021.

In Vietnam, the special was streamed on FPT Play and VieOn with Vietnamese subtitles being hardcoded. In South Africa, the special was aired on MNET(DStv) on May 30, 2021, and was released for streaming on Showmax on May 31, 2021.

== Reception ==
=== Critical response ===
On the review aggregator website Rotten Tomatoes, 67% of 57 critics' reviews are positive, with an average rating of 6.4/10. The website's consensus reads: "It may work best for die-hards, but when it cuts out the noise and focuses on the connections, Friends: The Reunion is as warm and comforting as a night in the café." Metacritic, which uses a weighted average, assigned the special a score of 65 out of 100, based on 31 critics, indicating "generally favorable reviews".

=== Ratings and viewership ===
According to a TV analytics provider TVision, Friends: The Reunion was watched by an estimated 29% of U.S. streaming households on May 27. It also revealed that a significant part of its audience were people between the ages of 35 and 54 (50%) and female (55.4%). According to the analytics company Antenna, the special also drove more subscription to HBO Max in its opening weekend in the U.S. than any of Warner Bros.' new movies in 2021. In the United Kingdom, Friends: The Reunion aired on Sky One and became the channel's most watched programme in its history, with 5.3 million viewers tuning in.

=== Accolades ===
Award	Date of ceremony	Category	Recipient(s)	Result	Ref
Hollywood Critics Association	August 29, 2021	Best Streaming Sketch Series, Variety Series, Talk Show or Comedy/Variety Special	Friends: The Reunion	Nominated	
Primetime Emmy Awards	September 19, 2021	Outstanding Variety Special (Pre-Recorded)	Ben Winston, Kevin S. Bright, Marta Kauffman, David Crane, Jennifer Aniston, Courteney Cox, Lisa Kudrow, Matt LeBlanc, Matthew Perry, David Schwimmer, Emma Conway, James Longman, Stacey Thomas-Muir, Brett Blakeney, Dave Piendak, Carly Robyn Segal, Guy Harding, Paul Monaghan, Tracie Fiss, Mike Darnell, Brooke Karzen and James Corden	Nominated	
Primetime Emmy Awards	September 11 and 12, 2021	Outstanding Directing for a Variety Special	Ben Winston	Nominated	
Primetime Emmy Awards	September 11 and 12, 2021	Outstanding Lighting Design/Lighting Direction for a Variety Special	Patrick Boozer, Lynn Costa, Russell Fine, Noah Mitz and Madigan Stehly	Nominated	
Primetime Emmy Awards	September 11 and 12, 2021	Outstanding Production Design for a Variety Special	Greg Grande, Daren Janes and John Shaffner	Nominated	
People's Choice Awards	December 7, 2021	The Pop Special of 2021	Friends: The Reunion	Won	
