= The One Where Ross Got High =

- Friends episode
- Episode no.: Season 6 Episode 9
- Directed by: Kevin S. Bright
- Written by: Gregory S. Malins
- Production code: 225559
- Original air date: November 25, 1999

Episode chronology
← Previous "The One with Ross's Teeth"	Next → "The One with the Routine"
- Friends season 6

"The One Where Ross Got High" is the ninth episode of Friends' sixth season. It first aired on the NBC network in the United States on November 25, 1999.

== Plot ==
Monica, preparing the group's Thanksgiving Day dinner, receives a phone call from her and Ross's parents Jack and Judy, who are planning to join them. Chandler is astonished to discover that she has not told them yet that he has moved in with her: she has avoided it because they do not like him. Chandler promises to win them over as best he can. Joey's new roommate, Janine, invites him and Ross to celebrate Thanksgiving with her friends, most of whom are attractive female dancers like her. Monica refuses to let them go, as they had earlier promised to spend Thanksgiving in her apartment, and Joey mopes around the apartment for the rest of the evening.

When Jack and Judy arrive, Phoebe is disturbed to discover she has a crush on Jack after a dream she had about him several days ago. Chandler's attempts to charm Jack and Judy fall flat until Ross deduces the source of their animosity: they had once walked in on Ross smoking marijuana during college, and Ross had claimed the marijuana was Chandler's. Chandler and Monica demand Ross reveal the truth to his parents, but Ross stubbornly avoids the subject.

Rachel, tasked with making dessert despite her inexperience, has chosen to make a traditional English trifle. She describes the dish to Ross and Joey, which includes a layer of beef sauteed with peas and onions. Despite Rachel's confidence that this is correct, Ross and Joey discover that two of the pages in Monica's cookbook are stuck together, resulting in a trifle that is half shepherd's pie. To preserve Rachel's pride and not delay dinner, Ross distracts Rachel while Joey privately convinces everyone to pretend the beef-filled dessert is delicious. Phoebe uses her vegetarianism as an excuse not to eat it, and heads to Rachel's old bedroom to take a nap. The others all make excuses to eat their portions in locations that will allow them to discreetly dispose of the food; when Rachel becomes suspicious, Ross rapidly devours his portion before she can taste it. Unexpectedly, Joey enjoys the dessert. Phoebe returns from her nap with her crush on Jack dispelled after a dream in which he cheated on her before Jacques Cousteau appeared and defended her.

After Ross again avoids telling Jack and Judy the truth about the marijuana incident, Monica abruptly tells them herself. This sparks a shouting match between the two siblings as they each tattle about the other's secrets, including Ross and Rachel's recent short-lived marriage and Chandler and Monica's status as roommates; in the chaos, Rachel also discovers her cooking mistake. Initially bewildered by the influx of information, Jack and Judy express their disappointment in Monica and Ross for keeping secrets from them, but apologize to Chandler and thank him for not only making Monica happy, but for supporting Ross as well.

During the closing credits, Rachel is incredulous that everyone ate the dessert she made just so she would not feel bad. The group confesses that none of them fully ate the dessert, until Joey reveals that he has eaten everyone else's abandoned portions.

== Reception ==
- Purple Clover placed the episode on their list of "20 Funniest Episodes of Friends".
- The website Digital Spy ranked it the twelfth best Friends episode.
- GamesRadar+ ranked "The One Where Ross Got High" the sixteenth best Friends episode.
- Radio Times ranked it the eleventh funniest Friends episode.
