= The One Where Rachel Has a Baby =

- Friends episodes
- Episode nos.: Season 8 Episodes 23 and 24
- Directed by: Kevin S. Bright
- Written by: Scott Silveri (part 1); Marta Kauffman (part 2); David Crane (part 2)
- Production codes: 227422 (part 1); 227423 (part 2)
- Original air date: May 16, 2002
- Running time: Part 1: 22 min Part 2: 22 min

Guest appearances
- Christina Pickles as Judy Geller; Maggie Wheeler as Janice Litman-Goralnik; Amanda Carlin as Dr. Long; Rachael Harris as Julie; Tim DeKay as Marc; Debi Mazar as Evil Bitch; Eddie McClintock as Clifford Burnette; Maurice Godin as Sid; JoNell Kennedy as Nurse #1; Henriette Mantel as Nurse #2; Mark Daniel Cade as Doctor; Laura Margolis as Woman Giving Birth; Karin Co as Woman with Mild Contractions; Jimmy Palumbo as Sick Bastard; Sarah Rush as Nurse #3; Bryce and Preston Green as Emma

Episode chronology
← Previous "The One Where Rachel Is Late"	Next → "The One Where No One Proposes"
- Friends season 8

"The One Where Rachel Has a Baby" is the double-length finale of the eighth season of Friends. It first aired on NBC on May 16, 2002. In the episode, Rachel spends 21 hours in labor, and watches many of her roommates, including Janice, giving birth before her. Monica and Chandler decided to have a baby, Judy wants Ross to propose to Rachel, Phoebe flirts with a patient at the hospital, and Rachel accidentally thinks Joey proposed to her.

Part 1 was written by Scott Silveri, and Part 2 was written by Marta Kauffman and David Crane. Both episodes were directed by Kevin S. Bright. The two part finale was the most watched episode of the season with 34.91 million viewers. Jennifer Aniston won an Emmy Award for her work in the episode.

== Plot ==
=== Part I ===
Ross and Rachel frantically arrive at the hospital, where they are greeted by Chandler, Monica, Phoebe, and Joey. Even though they requested a private room, the only room available is a semi-private one. Many couples come and go as Rachel waits hours to give birth. Judy comes into the room, asking to talk to Ross privately outside in the hallway. She gives Ross his grandmother's engagement ring and wants him to propose to Rachel with it. Ross is unsure about it but takes the ring anyway, putting it in his jacket.

Meanwhile, in the waiting room, Monica jokes to Chandler about wanting to have a baby just to freak him out. He agrees that he has been thinking about having a baby too which in return freaks Monica out. The two of them decide to start a family and start trying for one right away while at the hospital. At the vending machine, Phoebe flirts with a patient named Cliff and goes looking for his room. Chandler and Monica try to find somewhere in the hospital to have sex in, and when they find an empty room they are interrupted by a nurse. Rachel watches impatiently as women who arrived at the hospital after her go into labor before her. Ross and Rachel are shocked when one of the women is Janice.

=== Part II ===
Next door, Chandler and Monica discover another empty private room. As they are getting it on, they stop when they hear Janice's laugh, and go next door to find Janice there. With help from Joey, Phoebe finds Cliff's room but wants him to pose as "Dr. Drake Ramoray" to ask Cliff personal questions before she goes in. When Phoebe gets to know Cliff better, Days of Our Lives is playing on the TV, and Cliff recognizes Joey. Phoebe tries to deny it, but Joey bursts into the room to tell her Rachel is having her baby. They end up telling him the truth, and Cliff agrees to give Phoebe another chance.

Finally, after 21 hours of labor, Rachel gives birth to her baby girl. Ross and Rachel share an intimate moment in the delivery room. The rest of the gang comes by the room to see Rachel and the baby, and they ask what her name is. Ross introduces her as Isabella, which makes Rachel cry, feeling that Isabella is not the right name. He then says their backup name, Delilah, which disgusts Rachel, who compares the name to a biblical whore. Monica gladly gives Rachel the girl name she has picked out to use for herself, Emma, since Rachel liked it so much.

Later on Rachel, who is now all alone in her room, gets a visit from Janice, who introduces her new baby, Aaron, which leaves Rachel aghast after looking at him. Janice tells her that Ross may not always be there for her and the baby, and he might even start a new family with another woman. She leaves Rachel saddened and afraid, especially when Ross walks in and tells her he got distracted talking to a nurse while on his way to get some sodas.

Looking at Emma through the nursery window, Phoebe asks Ross why he and Rachel are not together. He tells her the reasons why, but she tells him he could finally have everything he has dreamed of since he was 15. Back in the room, Joey walks in and Rachel confesses her fears of having to raise Emma alone. Joey comforts her, telling her that he will always be there for her. Joey goes to get Rachel some tissues, and when he does, the ring falls from Ross' jacket. Joey kneels to pick it up, and Rachel, believing he is proposing, impulsively says yes. Meanwhile, Ross, with a bouquet in his hand, makes his way back to the room, intending to ask Rachel if she wants to start things up again.

== Production ==
Kevin S. Bright directed the two part finale with Scott Silveri writing Part 1, and Marta Kauffman and David Crane writing Part 2.

== Reception ==
=== Accolades ===
At the 54th Annual Primetime Emmy Awards, Jennifer Aniston won Outstanding Lead Actress in a Comedy Series for her work in the episode. At the 54th Primetime Creative Arts Emmy Awards, the episode was nominated for Outstanding Art Direction for a Single-Camera Series, and Outstanding Sound Mixing for a Comedy or Drama Series (Half-Hour) and Animation,.
