= The One with the Apothecary Table =

- Friends episode
- Episode no.: Season 6 Episode 11
- Directed by: Kevin S. Bright
- Story by: Zachary Rosenblatt
- Teleplay by: Brian Boyle
- Production code: 225560
- Original air date: January 6, 2000

Guest appearance
- Elle Macpherson as Janine

Episode chronology
← Previous "The One with the Routine"	Next → "The One with the Joke"
- Friends season 6

"The One with the Apothecary Table" is the eleventh episode of the sixth season of the American television situation comedy Friends, which was broadcast on NBC on January 6, 2000. The plot concerns Rachel (Jennifer Aniston) buying an apothecary table from Pottery Barn and trying to keep roommate Phoebe (Lisa Kudrow) from finding out that she bought it from a chain store.

The episode was directed by Kevin S. Bright, written by Brian Boyle (from a story by Zachary Rosenblatt) and guest-stars Elle Macpherson in her final appearance as recurring character Janine Lecroix. The episode and producers attracted criticism for the blatant product placement present in the story.

== Plot ==
After Rachel buys an apothecary table from Pottery Barn for her and Phoebe's apartment, she learns from Monica that Phoebe hates Pottery Barn and its mass-produced products, because she believes there is no symbolical history behind them. In order to keep the table, Rachel tells her that she purchased it from the flea market at a surprising discount, making it antique in Phoebe's eyes. The plan is eventually ruined when, at Ross's place, Phoebe notices an exactly identical apothecary table, and Ross, having at first decided not to tell Phoebe, gets angry when she spills wine on a new sheet, also from Pottery Barn, and tells the truth. To cover for this, Rachel claims that Pottery Barn ripped off their table's design; and later ends up buying a collection of items from Pottery Barn, claiming they are antiques. Ross, fed up with her lying, makes Rachel take Phoebe to the flea market to get some antique furniture. They do not find any there, but on the way home, Phoebe glances at a window display from Pottery Barn, realizes that Rachel had bought all the items from there, and becomes angry with her. However, she falls into liking a lamp from Pottery Barn, which is the only piece of furniture that Rachel has not bought from there. She intentionally coerces Rachel into threatening to move out unless she buys her that lamp.

Meanwhile, Joey convinces his roommate and new girlfriend, Janine, to go double dating with Chandler and Monica; but without Monica and Chandler's knowledge, Janine criticizes the whole experience to Joey, disliking Chandler's funny quotes and Monica's loud behavior. He is forced to admit this to them after she dodges another double date; they become angry at her but Joey manages to convince them to give her another chance. After the second double date, Chandler and Monica overhear Janine's true feelings about them and the situation escalates into an argument between them. Joey, torn between his feelings for Janine and respect for his best friends, demands that Janine try to get along with them, threatening to break up with her if she does not. Janine agrees and apologizes to Monica. However, she then quietly insults her, which culminates in an off-screen fight between the two. Joey, angry and upset, breaks up with Janine, and she moves out.

== Reception ==
Entertainment Weekly rates the episode B+, describing Janine's criticism of Monica and Chandler as inspired, and enjoying the mockery of the "omnipresent" Pottery Barn. The authors of Friends Like Us: The Unofficial Guide to Friends point out that viewers are aware that new characters will not remain on the series for long, citing Paolo, Julie, Richard Burke and Emily Waltham as examples. They further describe Janine's character as lacking personality, suggesting it is either bad writing or bad acting by MacPherson.

In a 2004 feature to mark the end of the series, EW compiled a "best product placement" list, placing this episode at number one. When questioned in 2000 about why there was product placement in the episode, Peter Roth of Warner Bros. played down the criticism by stating that the deal struck with Pottery Barn "offset the high cost of production", and while Pottery Barn donated pieces for the episode they denied paying for any product placement. The episode had lasting effects for Pottery Barn; in a 2004 interview Patrick Connolly of Williams Sonoma said the "phones light up with catalog requests every time it airs" in syndication.

This episode is cited in a study of product placement in television.
