= The One with Rachel's Other Sister =

- Friends episode
- Episode no.: Season 9 Episode 8
- Directed by: Kevin S. Bright
- Written by: Shana Goldberg-Meehan
- Production code: 175258
- Original air date: November 21, 2002

Guest appearance
- Christina Applegate as Amy

Episode chronology
← Previous "The One with Ross's Inappropriate Song"	Next → "The One with Rachel's Phone Number"
- Friends season 9

"The One With Rachel's Other Sister" is the eighth episode of Friends' ninth season. It first aired on the NBC network in the United States on November 21, 2002. The episode received renewed attention in October 2023 after the death of Matthew Perry, particularly in the scene where his character Chandler jokes "I guess I'll be the one who dies first" as he became the first of the main cast to die.

== Plot ==
Rachel's other sister Amy unexpectedly turns up at Ross and Rachel's apartment for Thanksgiving. Initially, Amy turned up to borrow a hair straightener but ends up spending Thanksgiving with the gang after her married boyfriend cancels dinner on her. Things do not go well with Amy following numerous rude comments and misunderstandings, such as referring to Emma as "Emmet", mistaking Phoebe's name as a "funny noise" and her comments that the makers of Days of Our Lives must "put a lot of make-up" on Joey. Once things have seemingly calmed down, Amy brings up the issue of who gets custody of Emma in the event of Ross and Rachel's death. Amy thinks that she should get custody, however she is surprised to find out that custody would go to Chandler and Monica.

This conversation of who would get custody of Emma escalates further once Chandler finds out that he would have to give Emma up in the event of Monica's death but Monica would not have to give up Emma in the event of Chandler's death. This leads Chandler to believe that he would be an unfit single parent. After dinner, Amy is still angry at Ross and Rachel's decision and a fight breaks out between Amy and Rachel. Surprisingly, Chandler swoops in to calm things down between the two sisters. Ross becomes impressed with Chandler's abilities and he decides that Chandler would indeed be fit enough to raise Emma alone if Monica died.

== Reception ==
In its original broadcast, the episode was viewed by 26.76 million people and had a rating of 12.5/32. For her performance in this episode, Christina Applegate won an Emmy for "Outstanding Guest Actress in a Comedy Series" in 2003. In 2019, Collider picked this episode as the best of its season.
