= The One with the Proposal =

- Friends episodes
- Episode nos.: Season 6 Episodes 24/25
- Directed by: Kevin S. Bright
- Written by: Scott Silveri & Shana Goldberg-Meehan (Part 1); Andrew Reich & Ted Cohen (Part 2)
- Production codes: 225573 (Part 1); 225574 (Part 2)
- Original air date: May 18, 2000

Guest appearances
- Tom Selleck as Richard; Alexandra Holden as Elizabeth

Episode chronology
| ← Previous "The One with the Ring" | Next → "The One with Monica's Thunder" |
- Friends season 6

"The One with the Proposal" is a double length episode of the television situation comedy Friends. It first aired on May 18, 2000, as the finale to the sixth season. It is normally transmitted as a whole episode in a one-hour slot, but when it is split for a half-hour slot the episodes are differentiated by having the title suffixed with Part One and Part Two. The episode was selected for Volume 4 of the "Best of Friends" DVD series, and when the series left the air in 2004, several articles and viewer polls included this episode as one of the 10 best of the series' 236 episodes.

== Plot ==
=== Part One ===
Ross is questioned by his friends about the future of his relationship with Elizabeth, his former student. Ross initially claims he and Elizabeth are great together, but after walking in on her and her friends having a water balloon fight, he decides she is too young after all and breaks off the relationship. Ross questions his choice for a moment afterwards, but Elizabeth drops water balloons on his head from her window as he leaves, solidifying his decision.

Rachel takes Phoebe and Joey to a charity event helping children, featuring a silent auction. Joey accidentally bids $20,000 on a yacht, thinking the point of the auction was to guess the value of the items, and wins. Rachel and Joey try to convince the next highest bidder to buy the boat, but when Rachel sells the image of piloting the boat to him, Joey changes his mind and keeps it.

After weeks of preparation, Chandler is ready to propose to Monica. He takes Monica to her favorite restaurant, but just as he starts to propose, Monica's ex-boyfriend Richard enters with a date and joins them, ruining it. After the date, the others visit Chandler and Monica at home to see the ring; Chandler barely stops them. With Chandler worried that Monica will figure out that he intends to propose, Joey suggests that Chandler pretend he does not care about marriage. Meanwhile, Richard approaches Monica at work and declares he still loves her.

=== Part Two ===
Richard tells Monica that he is willing to have children with her, as his refusal to do so caused their previous breakup. Later, Chandler tells her he hates marriage and cannot see why anyone should get married, leaving her confused and upset. When Monica complains to Joey and Joey confirms Chandler's supposed disinterest, Monica tells Joey that Richard agreed to marry her, leaving Joey in a panic and unable to convince her of Chandler's true intentions. Monica meets Richard at his apartment. After talking over the situation with him, she leaves by herself to think things over.

Feeling envious of Chandler and Monica, Rachel decides to find a "backup": a friend who will agree to marry her if they are both still single at 40. Phoebe reveals that she already has one: Joey. Rachel approaches Ross about being her backup, but Ross claims that Phoebe agreed to be his backup. Ross and Joey confront Phoebe about doubling up, so Phoebe and Rachel pick between the two boys at random. Phoebe gets Ross and Rachel gets Joey; after a moment, they switch with each other.

Joey tells Chandler that Monica is convinced Chandler will never marry her, so Chandler leaves to find her and propose. He arrives at Richard's apartment after she has left and stands up for himself, saying Richard lost his chance and that he intends to marry her. Richard advises Chandler to go to Monica, win her back, and never let her go like he did.

After searching for Monica all day, Chandler hurries back to his apartment. Joey meets him in the hall and claims Monica has left for her parents' house, despite Joey trying to convince her otherwise. Chandler enters their apartment and finds Monica is still there surrounded by dozens of lit candles; Joey was pretending. Monica kneels to propose to Chandler, but is so overcome with emotion that Chandler kneels as well and proposes instead. Monica accepts. Joey, Rachel, and Phoebe enter from eavesdropping outside to celebrate. Phoebe hesitates as Ross is not present, but Rachel declares "he's done this three times, he knows what it's about." The end credits play while Monica and Chandler slow dance to Eric Clapton's "Wonderful Tonight".

== Production ==
According to the producers' DVD commentary for this episode, the original plot for Ross was to have Elizabeth announce that she was pregnant, ultimately resolving at the end of the following season when it would be revealed that Ross was not the father of the baby. This idea was ultimately rejected by the producers since it would be investing a lot of time in a secondary character without a payoff. It would have also been difficult to use the cliffhanger for Rachel's pregnancy.

Sources suggest that David Schwimmer was actually out of the country filming Band of Brothers when the final scenes of the episode were filmed, hence why Ross is not there when the friends hug Monica and Chandler on hearing their announcement.

The producers decided to end the episode on a romantic moment rather than the usual joke. They also took care over the script before approaching Selleck to return as Richard, as the actor would only return if it seemed feasible.

The episode very nearly served as the series finale, given that NBC and Warner Bros. were in negotiations over the show's future up until four days before the episode aired. The series' stars demanded $750,000 salary for each actor per episode and agreed to a contract for two additional seasons, an agreement that later stretched into a further two seasons at $1 million salary for each of the stars.

== Reception ==
Entertainment Weekly listed Chandler and Monica's proposal scene in their "26 Great 'I Love You's".

=== Awards and nominations ===
- Primetime Emmy Award for Outstanding Multi-Camera Picture Editing for a Series (nominated)
