= James Michael Tyler =

American actor (1962–2021)

- James Michael Tyler as Gunther in Friends
- Born: May 28, 1962; Mississippi, U.S. (Note: Birthplace has been cited as either Greenwood, Mississippi or Winona, Mississippi)
- Died: October 24, 2021 (aged 59); Los Angeles, California, U.S.
- Occupation: Actor
- Years active: 1992–2021
- Notable credit: Friends (1994–2004)
- Spouses: Barbara Chadsey (m. 1995, divorced); Jennifer Carno (m. 2017)

James Michael Tyler (May 28, 1962 – October 24, 2021) was an American actor best known for portraying Gunther on the NBC sitcom Friends. Prior to acting, he was an assistant film editor and production assistant. His early works included being the production assistant for Fat Man and Little Boy. He also portrayed Oscar Bevins in the 1997 thriller film Motel Blue.

== Early life ==
James Michael Tyler was born on May 28, 1962, the youngest of five children, in either Greenwood, Mississippi or Winona, Mississippi.

When Tyler was ten years old, his father, a former USAF captain, died. Just one year later, when Tyler was age eleven, his mother died. Afterwards, Tyler moved to Anderson, South Carolina to live with his sister. Tyler graduated from T. L. Hanna High School in 1980.

He graduated from Anderson College (now Anderson University) in 1982 with a two-year Associate's degree and subsequently graduated from Clemson University with a degree in geology in 1984. During his time at Clemson, he was a member of a student theatre group, the Clemson Players. This experience sparked his interest in becoming an actor. He received his Master of Fine Arts degree from the University of Georgia in 1987.

== Career ==
In 1988, he moved to Los Angeles and became an assistant film editor and production assistant. The same year, he was a production assistant on the film Fat Man and Little Boy. In L.A., he also worked at Guitar Center and a coffee shop called the Bourgeois Pig. It was here that he met his first wife, Barbara Chadsey, whom he married in 1995.

From 1994 to 2004, James Michael Tyler played Gunther on the sitcom Friends. Gunther was a coffee shop worker at Central Perk who had unrequited love for Rachel Green, played by Jennifer Aniston. His real-life experience as a barista gave an assistant director on Friends the idea to put him behind the counter of Central Perk to make the set seem more "authentic". This led to a ten-year career with appearances in 148 of Friends' 236 episodes; he is the show's most-frequently-appearing recurring character actor.

The night before his first appearance on Friends, a hair-stylist friend asked if he could practice bleaching on Tyler's hair. Tyler agreed, and the makers of Friends loved it so much that what should have been a one-off look ended up becoming part of his character. He ended up having to bleach his hair every week for ten years.

In honor of Friends' 15th anniversary in 2009, Tyler officially opened the temporary Central Perk pop-up replica in London. It was open for two weeks from September to October and fans could apply for tickets to receive a free coffee and see memorabilia from the show. He appeared in the unaired pilot satire sitcom Nobody's Watching, playing himself on the set of Central Perk.

In honor of Friends' 20th anniversary in 2014, Tyler made appearances at a Central Perk replica in SoHo.

Tyler appeared in the BBC/Showtime sitcom Episodes (Series 2, Episode 6) as himself playing an ice hockey coach, when Matt LeBlanc tries unsuccessfully to get the other main stars from Friends to appear in the promotional video for the fictional television show Pucks.

He supported the Lili Claire Foundation and AIDS Project Los Angeles charities.

== Personal life ==
In 1995, Tyler married Barbara Chadsey. The couple separated in 2003, and in 2014, he filed for divorce, citing irreconcilable differences. He married Jennifer Carno in 2017.

== Death ==
Tyler was diagnosed with prostate cancer in 2018, but did not publicly disclose his illness until June 2021, shortly after the release of Friends: The Reunion. The cancer metastasized to his spine, leading him to use a wheelchair. He died of complications from the disease at his home in Los Angeles, California, on October 24, 2021, at age 59.

== Filmography ==
=== Film ===
Year	Film	Role	Notes
1992	The Roommate	Bar Patron	First credited role, short film
1997	Motel Blue	Oscar Bevins	
1997	The Disturbance at Dinner	Wilson Pomade	
1999	Foreign Correspondents	Randy	
2010	Jason's Big Problem	Blane	
2020	Processing	Frank Brandt	Short film
2020	The Gesture and The Word	Gilbert (the postman)	Short film - The Gesture and the Word

=== Television ===
Year	Title	Role	Notes
1994–2004	Friends	Gunther	Recurring role, 148 episodes
2000	Just Shoot Me!	Doctor	Episode: "Donnie Returns"
2001	Sabrina, the Teenage Witch	Ethan	Episode: "My Best Shot"
2004	Iron Chef America: Battle of the Masters	Judge	Episode: Morimoto/Flay VS. Sakai/Batali
2005	Scrubs	Therapist	Episode: "My Faith in Humanity"
2006	Nobody's Watching	Himself	Unaired pilot
2010	Keeping up with the Downs	Chase	Made for TV short film
2012	Episodes	Himself	Episode Six, Season Two
2013	Modern Music	Chad Levitz	Main role, 5 episodes (Web series)
2021	Friends: The Reunion	Himself	HBO Max Special

=== Video games ===
Year	Title	Role	Notes
2005	Friends: The One with All the Trivia	Narrator and host	
2005	Friends: Scene It?	Narrator	DVD board game

=== Music video ===
Year	Title	Artist
2007	"Come Tomorrow"	Chicane

== If You Knew spoken word performance ==
In July 2021, producers Al Gomes and Connie Watrous of Big Noise, along with two-time Emmy Award nominee Tim Labonte and Grammy Award winner Alan Boyd, conceptualized and created a short film for Tyler's spoken word performance entitled If You Knew.

Tyler's recording had been featured on a 2016 tribute album to The Beach Boys' lyricist Stephen Kalinich called Be Still that Gomes, Watrous, and Boyd had also produced. The Recording Academy placed the collection on the Official Ballot for the 59th Annual Grammy Awards for Best Spoken Word Album. Tyler also composed the music for the recording.

The new short film for If You Knew was produced to honor Tyler and also create a fundraiser for the organization that was working closely with him, the Prostate Cancer Foundation. All the streaming proceeds of the video, and Tyler's original recording, are being donated to the Prostate Cancer Foundation.
