= Brian Buckner =

American television writer

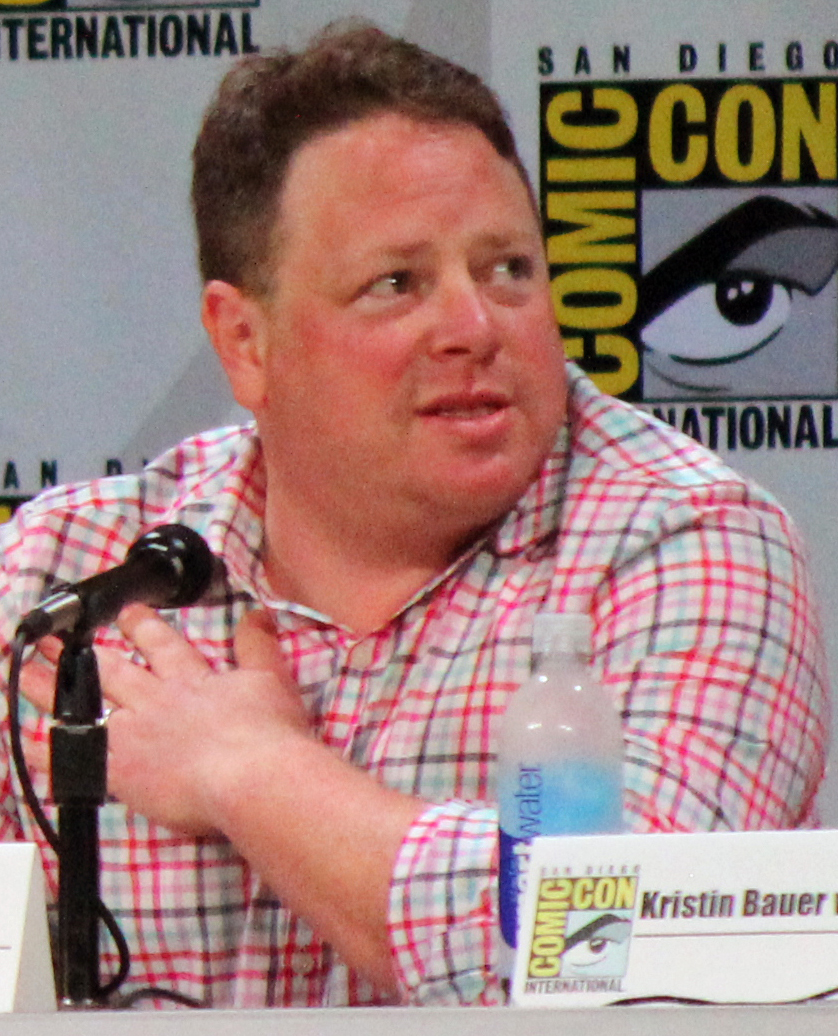
Bucker at the True Blood panel at San Diego Comic-Con in July 2014

Brian Buckner is an American television writer, mostly known for his work on sit-coms such as Spin City and Friends. He also served as co-executive producer of the HBO vampire series True Blood. Prior to 2005, he frequently worked with writing partner Sebastian Jones.

== Television career ==
=== Spin City ===
- 1.4 Pride and Prejudice
- 1.12 Criss Cross
- 1.18 Snowbound
- 1.24 Mayor Over Miami
- 2.9 Family Affair: Part 1
- 2.21 Bye, Bye, Birdies
- 3.4 The Deer Hunter
- 3.14 The Nutty Deputy Mayor

=== Friends ===
- 2.21 The One with the Bullies
- 7.6 The One with the Nap Partners
- 7.13 The One Where Rosita Dies
- 7.16 The One with the Truth About London
- 7.17 The One with the Cheap Wedding Dress
- 7.22 The One with Chandler's Dad
- 8.5 The One with Rachel's Date
- 8.10 The One with Monica's Boots
- 8.14 The One with the Secret Closet
- 8.21 The One with the Cooking Class
- 9.3 The One with the Pediatrician
- 9.12 The One with Phoebe's Rats
- 9.17 The One with the Memorial Service
- 9.18 The One with the Lottery
- 10.3 The One with Ross's Tan

=== True Blood ===
- 1.04 Escape from Dragon House
- 1.09 Plaisir d'Amour
- 2.04 Keep This Party Going
- 2.06 Hard-Hearted Hannah
- 3.01 Bad Blood
- 3.07 Hitting the Ground
- 4.02 You Smell Like Dinner
- 4.09 Let's Get Out of Here
- 5.01 Turn! Turn! Turn!
- 5.07 In the Beginning
- 6.09 Life Matters
- 7.03 Fire in the Hole
- 7.09 Love Is to Die
- 7.10 Thank You

=== Fear the Walking Dead ===
- 2.06 Sicut Cervus
- 2.13 Date of Death
