= Gunther (Friends) =

Fictional character from the American sitcom Friends

- Friends character
- James Michael Tyler as Gunther
- First appearance: "The One with the Sonogram at the End" (1994)
- Last appearance: "The Last One" (2004)
- Created by: David Crane; Marta Kauffman
- Portrayed by: James Michael Tyler

In-universe information
- Occupation: Manager at Central Perk coffee shop

Gunther is a fictional character in the sitcom Friends, played by James Michael Tyler. He is the manager of the Central Perk coffee house, who first appears as a background character in "The One with the Sonogram at the End"; the second episode of the series. He is a former actor who once played Bryce on All My Children before that character was "killed in an avalanche."

== Character biography ==
Gunther develops an unrequited crush on Rachel in the third season, which he keeps to himself until "The Last One". Apart from Ross, whom he dislikes, he is on reasonably good terms with the rest of the gang despite occasionally being annoyed by wacky antics or comments from them. His motivation for disliking Ross is jealousy (as he is aware of Ross's relationship with Rachel), which is made clear numerous times, most notably in "The One with the Morning After" when he reveals to Rachel that Ross slept with another woman while Rachel was on a break from their relationship. Gunther appears in a majority of the episodes, but only occasionally calls attention to himself and almost never has a large role in the plot of an episode. In "The One with The Stain", Gunther is shown to be fluent in Dutch (although with a strong American accent), calling Ross an "ezel" as he converses with him.

== Casting ==
James Michael Tyler was cast as Gunther because he was the only extra who could competently work the cappuccino machine on the Central Perk set. Tyler appears as Gunther in a co-host voice-over in the Friends trivia game for PS2, PC and Xbox, and in the board game Friends: Scene It?. The Seattle Times ranked Gunther as the eighth best guest character of the series in 2004. When asked in 2009 by Heatworld.com what Gunther would be doing "now", Tyler joked, "He'd probably have a very traditional marriage, with lots of white-haired babies running around with hair brighter than the sun." Aside from the main cast, he appears in the most episodes.

== Reception ==
The BBC praised the character of Gunther.
