= The One with the Morning After =

- Friends episode
- Episode no.: Season 3 Episode 16
- Directed by: James Burrows
- Written by: David Crane & Marta Kauffman
- Production code: 465264
- Original air date: February 20, 1997

Episode chronology
← Previous "The One Where Ross and Rachel Take a Break"	Next → "The One Without the Ski Trip"

"The One with the Morning After" is the sixteenth episode of the third season of the American television situation comedy Friends and 64th overall, which aired on NBC on February 20, 1997. The plot centers on Ross (David Schwimmer) dealing with the repercussions of sleeping with another woman hours after he and Rachel (Jennifer Aniston) took a break.

The episode was written by the show's creators, David Crane and Marta Kauffman, directed by James Burrows, and guest-stars James Michael Tyler as Gunther, and Angela Featherstone as Chloe, the girl from the Xerox shop whom Ross ends up sleeping with after looking for comfort when he and Rachel made the decision to take a break from their relationship in the previous episode.

== Plot ==
The morning after Ross and Rachel decide to take a break from their relationship, Ross wakes up in his apartment with Chloe (Angela Featherstone) after a one-night stand. Rachel has left a message on Ross's answering machine, saying that she loves him and will stop by his apartment that morning. Unable to get rid of Chloe in time, Ross hides her behind his front door as Rachel arrives; the two reconcile and agree to resume their relationship.

Ross visits Joey (Matt LeBlanc) and Chandler (Matthew Perry) at their apartment to confess what he did. Joey and Chandler convince Ross not to admit his tryst with Chloe to Rachel, then help him work out "the trail": the list of people from the girl he slept with to the girl who can't find out. Chandler traces the trail from Chloe to her coworker Isaac, whose sister Jasmine works with Phoebe (Lisa Kudrow). Ross goes down the trail to prevent the news from getting to Rachel, but discovers that it has already reached Jasmine. Jasmine agrees not to tell Phoebe, but mentions that she has already told her roommate: Gunther (James Michael Tyler). Ross rushes to Central Perk to secure Gunther's silence, but finds Rachel already there, moments after Gunther told her.

Meanwhile, Monica (Courteney Cox) and Phoebe are in Monica's bedroom trying a new organic waxing product, which is unexpectedly extremely painful. Joey and Chandler rush in after hearing their screams, but before they can leave again, Rachel, followed by Ross, angrily storms into the apartment, trapping the other four in the bedroom without their knowledge. Ross and Rachel fight at length, with Ross haplessly attempting to make amends and Rachel furious over being kept in the dark. Chandler and Joey attempt to leave, but when Ross tells Rachel that it was their idea to prevent the news from reaching her, they decide against it. As the fight drags on for hours, the four friends, eavesdropping from the bedroom, eventually resort to eating the organic wax to stave off their hunger, unsuccessfully.

By 3:00 a.m., Ross and Rachel are exhausted and miserable, as are the other friends still trapped in the bedroom. Ross attempts to initiate intimacy with Rachel, but she flatly rebuffs him. Both the couple and the other four friends start to cry as Ross kneels and begs for forgiveness. Rachel tells Ross that she cannot forgive him because she cannot stop picturing him with Chloe, stating it has changed everything between them forever. Ross is left devastated, and their relationship officially ends.

Over the credits, the other four friends finally leave the bedroom and find Rachel asleep on the couch, with Ross nowhere to be seen. Monica drapes a blanket over Rachel as the other three quietly exit the apartment.

== Cast and crew ==
=== Main cast ===
- Jennifer Aniston as Rachel Green
- Courteney Cox as Monica Geller
- Lisa Kudrow as Phoebe Buffay
- Matt LeBlanc as Joey Tribbiani
- Matthew Perry as Chandler Bing
- David Schwimmer as Ross Geller

=== Guest stars ===
- Angela Featherstone as Chloe: the girl from the copy place that Ross sleeps with after him and Rachel took a break from their relationship in the previous episode.
- James Michael Tyler as Gunther: the manager of the Central Perk coffee house where the gang spends their free time, who also happens to be in love with Rachel.
- Maury Ginsberg as Isaac: Chloe's coworker at the copy place.
- Cynthia Mann as Jasmine: Isaac's sister, who also happens to be Phoebe's coworker and Gunther's roommate.

=== Crew ===
- James Burrows (director)
- Marta Kauffman and David Crane (writers)

== Reception ==
In an interview, Aniston mentions the infamous breakup stating, "The breakup. Well, that was sort of the beginning of the end for them. Or, the beginning of the beginnings of endings and beginnings." It was the episode in which the show's dynamic had completely changed, and had left audiences more anxious for the next episode because more was at stake in terms of character and plot development. In the show's Blu-ray and DVD commentary track, the show's co-creators Marta Kauffman and David Crane, along with producing partner Kevin S. Bright, discussed the difficulties of trying to make this episode both dramatic and comedic. Part of this was due to Aniston's performance as Rachel being a little too realistic, and the situation of the breakup being too excruciatingly familiar. According to Kauffman, "Nearly every adult watching this episode would've had some kind of personal memory of a similarly awful split". This is also the episode where someone utters for the first time the classic saying, "we were on a break", which is later said as an ongoing gag throughout the rest of the series.
