= Friends season 10 =

Season of television series

Friends
- Season 10
- Friends season 10 DVD cover
- Showrunners: David Crane; Marta Kauffman
- Starring: Jennifer Aniston; Courteney Cox; Lisa Kudrow; Matt LeBlanc; Matthew Perry; David Schwimmer
- No. of episodes: 18

Release
- Original network: NBC
- Original release: September 25, 2003 – May 6, 2004

Season chronology
- ← Previous; Season 9

The tenth and final season of the American television sitcom Friends aired on NBC from September 25, 2003 to May 6, 2004.

== Season synopsis ==
The season premiere opens in Barbados, where the ninth season finale ended: Joey sees Ross, his best friend, and Charlie, his ex-girlfriend, kissing in the hotel lobby, then goes to Rachel's room, where the two of them also kiss. However, before going further, they decide to seek Ross' approval, but Ross finds them kissing, back in Manhattan, before they can approach him. Ross tries to hide his hurt, to no avail. Joey eventually talks to Ross about the situation and Ross seems to give his blessings. After several obstacles prevent Joey and Rachel from consummating their relationship (including Joey being unable to untie Rachel's bra and Rachel accidentally kneeing Joey in the crotch), they decide to remain friends. By the sixth episode, Ross is single again when Charlie reunites with her ex-boyfriend.

Mike proposes to Phoebe and they marry mid-season. Monica and Chandler decide to adopt a child, after discovering they are infertile. They are eventually paired with a young, expecting mother named Erica (Anna Faris) and buy a house in Westchester county. Rachel is scouted for a fashion buyer job with Gucci, but her current boss (Mr. Zelner) is seated at the next table, in the restaurant where she is being interviewed. She is fired by Ralph Lauren and rejected by Gucci, which leaves her unemployed. While cleaning out her office at Ralph Lauren, she runs into Mark, her former Bloomingdale's colleague (from Season 3), who offers her a job with Louis Vuitton in Paris. Ross, unaware and still in love with her, secures her job at Ralph Lauren, even convincing her former boss to increase her salary. However, Rachel chooses Louis Vuitton and Paris. Saying her goodbyes to everyone, Rachel goes to Ross' apartment last, where they spend the night together. Expecting Rachel to now cancel her plans for Paris, he is devastated when she does not.

In the season's (and series') final episode, Joey and Phoebe help pack up Monica and Chandler's belongings, while Erica delivers; to their surprise, she has twins, a boy (Jack) and a girl (Erica). Rachel leaves Ross' apartment. Gunther declares his love for Rachel (at Central Perk). Rachel has to leave for the airport, immediately after meeting the twins.

While Joey, Monica and Chandler finish packing, Phoebe and Ross leave in her cab to catch Rachel at the airport, but they end up at JFK, the wrong airport. Meanwhile, Joey, Chandler and Monica disassemble the foosball table to remove a baby chick and duckling.

Phoebe's cell phone call to Rachel results in a chaotically absurd "phalange" panic and delay in the departure. They catch Rachel at the gate before she boards, but despite Ross' pleas, Rachel still boards. Ross returns home only to find an answering-machine message from Rachel declaring her love, but she is prevented by a flight attendant from leaving the plane, and her call is disconnected partway through. Ross is frantic until Rachel enters his apartment, saying "I got off the plane". They kiss and declare their love for each other. The last scene of the series is everyone putting their keys on the counter in Monica's apartment. When Rachel asks if they have time for one last coffee, Chandler jokingly replies, "Where?" Jefferson Airplane's “Embryonic Journey” plays as the camera pans across the empty apartment, before landing on the purple front door. The show then fades to black. The tag scene pans around New York.

== Cast and characters ==
=== Main cast ===
- Jennifer Aniston as Rachel Green
- Courteney Cox Arquette as Monica Geller - Bing
- Lisa Kudrow as Phoebe Buffay-Hannigan
- Matt LeBlanc as Joey Tribbiani
- Matthew Perry as Chandler Bing
- David Schwimmer as Ross Geller

=== Recurring cast ===
- Paul Rudd as Mike Hannigan
- Aisha Tyler as Charlie Wheeler
- Anna Faris as Erica
- James Michael Tyler as Gunther

=== Guest stars ===
- Anne Dudek as Precious
- Maggie Wheeler as Janice Litman-Goralnik
- Elliott Gould as Jack Geller
- Christina Pickles as Judy Geller
- Giovanni Ribisi as Frank Buffay, Jr.
- Christina Applegate as Amy Green
- Greg Kinnear as Benjamin Hobart
- Ron Leibman as Leonard Green
- Ellen Pompeo as Missy Goldberg
- Donny Osmond as himself
- Danny DeVito as Officer Roy Goodbody
- Dakota Fanning as Mackenzie
- Jane Lynch as Ellen
- Jennifer Coolidge as Amanda Buffamonteezi
- Maria Pitillo as Laura
- Jim Meskimen as Bill
- Kellie Waymire as Colleen
- Daryl Sabara as Owen
- Annie Parisse as Sarah
- Jim O'Heir as Adoption Agency Worker
- Gregory Jbara as Gene Lester
- Gregory Itzin as Theodore Hannigan
- Cristine Rose as Bitsy Hannigan
- Brent Spiner as James Campbell
- Craig Robinson as Clerk

== Episodes ==
No. overall	No. in season	Title	Directed by	Written by	Original release date	Prod. code	U.S. viewers (millions)	Rating/share (18–49)
219	1	"The One After Joey and Rachel Kiss" (Note: Denotes a "super-sized" 40-minute episode (with advertisements; actual runtime around 28 minutes).)	Kevin S. Bright	Andrew Reich & Ted Cohen	September 25, 2003	176251	24.54	11.8/33
Rachel and Joey decide to talk to Ross about their relationship, while Ross tries to talk to Joey about his relationship with Charlie. Ross confesses his relationship to Joey but Joey chickens out. Ross later walks in on Rachel and Joey kissing. Monica has her hair done in cornrows to get rid of her frizzy hair but Chandler hates it. Monica finally comes around to Chandler's way of thinking when she gets her hair caught on the shower curtain. Phoebe finds out that Mike has been seeing a woman named Precious (Anne Dudek) for the past few months and now needs to break up with her. Phoebe waits for Mike to return from his break-up but finds herself breaking up for him when Precious shows up at Mike's apartment. Note: Originally aired as a 48-minute episode.
220	2	"The One Where Ross Is Fine"	Ben Weiss	Sherry Bilsing-Graham & Ellen Plummer	October 2, 2003	176252	22.37	10.6/30
Monica and Chandler are having a lot of trouble figuring out the adoption process so Phoebe sends them to a couple who have adopted. Monica and Chandler meet them and Monica instantly gets along with the woman (Kellie Waymire); however, later Chandler casually mentions to their son (Daryl Sabara) that he was adopted only to find out that he did not know about it. Chandler also tells him that Santa is not real. The couple then kick out Monica and Chandler after finding out about both this and Chandler trying to bribe him. Rachel and Joey think Ross might have problems with their new relationship but he assures them he is fine. Ross invites Rachel and Joey on a double-date with him and Charlie. They agree but Ross gets drunk at the awkward date. Joey stays with Ross overnight to make sure he is okay and they talk. Ross realizes that he has been apart from Rachel for so long that he should not stop Joey and Rachel's relationship. He does give Joey his blessing even though it still hurts him because they should see where the relationship is going. Phoebe hangs out with Frank Jr. (Giovanni Ribisi) and the triplets. The kids are driving Frank Jr. crazy and he offers Phoebe one of them. He comes to the realization that he could not possibly give up any of the children so Phoebe offers to babysit so Frank Jr. and Alice will have more time to relax. The episode ends with Chandler accidentally revealing to the triplets that Phoebe gave birth to them. He then jokes by saying "I now have to go tell Emma that she was an accident."
221	3	"The One with Ross' Tan"	Gary Halvorson	Brian Buckner	October 9, 2003	176253	21.87	10.3/28
After Ross sees Monica's tan, he decides to get a spray-on tan. After hearing seemingly straightforward instructions, he gets confused and accidentally gets a double dose on the front of his body and nothing on his back. Through a series of mishaps he gets more spray tan on his front until he is incredibly dark. Rachel and Joey attempt to take their relationship to the next level but Rachel keeps accidentally slapping Joey when he tries to rub her thigh, while Joey cannot get Rachel out of her bra. When Rachel accidentally knees Joey's crotch while trying to have rough sex, the pair ultimately decide to stay friends. Monica and Phoebe try to "cut out" an obnoxious old friend from the building when she visits from England (Jennifer Coolidge). This brings up memories of the time when Phoebe tried to "cut out" Monica many years before.
222	4	"The One with the Cake"	Gary Halvorson	Robert Carlock	October 23, 2003	176254	18.77	9.1/25
Ross and Rachel throw a birthday party for Emma and desperately want everyone to be there for it. Everyone has prior commitments: Chandler and Monica have a romantic weekend planned, Phoebe has a client, and Joey has an audition. Ross' parents show up and the group begins celebrating. Rachel soon realizes the cake is not a bunny, as planned, but an erotic cake with her daughter's picture on it. She goes off to get it fixed but Ross needs to go get her. Phoebe, Joey, Chandler and Monica battle to see who can leave with Monica and Chandler being left behind. Luckily everyone gets back before Rachel and Ross and Emma's birthday is celebrated just as Rachel envisioned.
223	5	"The One Where Rachel's Sister Babysits"	Roger Christiansen	Dana Klein Borkow	October 30, 2003	176255	19.37	9.0/24
Rachel's sister Amy (Christina Applegate) shows up at Ross' looking for Rachel and Rachel quickly learns she plans to marry her ex-boyfriend's father. Rachel takes her in, much to Joey's chagrin, and tries to help her get her life together. Amy offers to baby-sit Emma, who she calls Ella, but messes up by getting Emma's ears pierced. Rachel is incredibly upset but eventually she and Amy come to an understanding when Rachel finds out her other sister, Jill, is now fat. Mike attempts to propose to Phoebe on the big screen but Phoebe tells him how lame that is when another couple gets engaged that way. Phoebe tries to fix it by proposing to him on the big screen but Mike gets laughed at. Mike finally proposes at a restaurant and Phoebe accepts. Monica and Chandler ask Rachel to write a letter of recommendation for them to their adoption agency but Joey feels left out. They ask Joey but he tries to write the letter using big words, only for Joey to use a thesaurus to a ridiculous degree (to the point that he refers to himself as a baby kangaroo). He finally re-drafts the letter but gives the handwritten letter to the agency before Monica and Chandler can approve it. The agency thinks a child has written the letter and loves it. Note: Originally aired as a 43-minute episode.
224	6	"The One with Ross's Grant"	Ben Weiss	Sebastian Jones	November 6, 2003	176256	20.38	9.2/25
Ross applies for a paleontology grant – and finds out Charlie's ex-boyfriend – Benjamin Hobart (Greg Kinnear) reviews the applications. Ross and Charlie have dinner with him and it becomes obvious that Benjamin still has feelings for her. During the interview, Benjamin sabotages Ross' application by not asking him any paleontological questions. Ross is upset so he informs Charlie. Benjamin confesses his feelings to Charlie and his ploy to get her back. Charlie reveals she still has feelings for Benjamin and gets back together with him, ending her and Ross' relationship. Phoebe is getting rid of things so Mike can move in but is sad to part with her disturbing artwork, Gladys. Monica pretends to like it but secretly hates it. Phoebe gives it to her but Monica and Rachel fight over who should have it since Phoebe thinks they both want it. She makes another even more disturbing artwork Glynnis which Monica keeps while Rachel keeps Gladys. Joey wants Chandler to get him a job in a commercial Chandler is working on but Chandler does not think he is right for the part. Chandler lies to Joey, but Joey realises when Chandler does not comment on the bizarre Japanese male lipstick commercial from his audition tape. Chandler makes it up to Joey by wearing the lipstick from the commercial.
225	7	"The One with the Home Study"	Kevin S. Bright	Mark Kunerth	November 13, 2003	176257	20.21	9.5/25
Monica and Chandler are worried about the adoption agency interviewer when they learn Joey slept with her and never called her back. They keep assuring her they are not friends with Joey. Joey climbs up the fire escape to check on Chandler and Monica when they will not open the door. Joey pretends he was heartbroken since the interviewer never called him and successfully convinces her of that idea. Phoebe and Mike are hesitant to spend such a large amount of money on their wedding and agree to marry at City Hall with the money donated to charity. They have a change of heart and take the money back but then are guilt-ridden. Eventually the charity rejects their donation and tells them to have a good wedding. Ross tries to help Rachel get over her fear of swings while she helps him get over his fear of spiders.
226	8	"The One with the Late Thanksgiving"	Gary Halvorson	Shana Goldberg-Meehan	November 20, 2003	176259	20.66	9.4/26
Monica and Chandler decide not to host Thanksgiving but Phoebe convinces them to by appealing to Monica's competitive nature. Chandler helps out for the first time by making cranberry sauce and surprisingly, Monica lets him. Rachel and Phoebe enter Emma in a beauty pageant and win while Ross and Joey go to a Rangers game and as a result all four are nearly an hour late. Angry that nobody turned up on time when they did not want to host the meal to begin with, Monica and Chandler lock the door and refuse to let anyone in. Everyone manages to get their heads in the door but no further due to the chain being bolted, and eventually Joey gets stuck and is sent flying into the food when the door breaks. However, the argument is forgotten when Monica and Chandler get a call telling them a girl from Ohio has picked them to adopt her baby and everyone sits down for a belated Thanksgiving.
227	9	"The One with the Birth Mother"	David Schwimmer	Scott Silveri	January 8, 2004	176258	25.49	11.9/31
Monica and Chandler fly to Ohio to meet the birth mother, Erica, of their prospective child. It becomes clear very quickly their files have been mixed up since Erica thinks Chandler is a doctor and Monica is a minister. They go along with the lie, but Chandler feels guilty. He soon convinces Monica to come clean, which causes Erica to reject them. Chandler catches up to Erica and convinces her to still consider them. He tells her about their jobs, how much Monica wants this child, and that feels horrible that he cannot give his wife this one thing. Erica decides they are the right couple and that they can adopt her baby. Meanwhile, Joey is set up with one of Phoebe's friends but has problems on the date when she keeps eating off of his plate. Rachel and Phoebe take Ross shopping for clothes but Rachel's and Ross' bags get switched. Ross does not realize he is wearing a woman's sweater and is incredibly comfortable in it, only to go on a date with a woman which comes to a quick end when she wears the same garment.
228	10	"The One Where Chandler Gets Caught"	Gary Halvorson	Doty Abrams	January 15, 2004	176268	26.68	12.9/34
Rachel and Phoebe see Chandler getting into a car with another woman. He dodges their questions by pretending to be at work but they follow him to the suburbs and find them entering a house. They believe he is cheating on Monica and tell Ross and Joey. The four of them tell Monica but Monica does not react the way they thought she would. It soon comes out they are looking to buy a house in the suburbs to raise their family (the woman having been their realtor). The group tries to convince them to stay in the city while reminiscing about the past few years. In the end Monica and Chandler get the house and tell everyone they are moving right after giving them gifts.
229	11	"The One Where the Stripper Cries"	Kevin S. Bright	David Crane & Marta Kauffman	February 5, 2004	176260	24.91	11.4/29
Monica and Rachel throw Phoebe a bachelorette party but Phoebe is disappointed there is no stripper. Rachel and Monica hire a male stripper (Danny DeVito) at the last minute; but when he gets there, Phoebe insults him. He begins to cry. Ross and Chandler attend their college reunion and remember the girl they made a pact not to date. Ross makes his move but discovers Chandler used to make out with her all the time. Chandler informs Ross that he broke the pact as well but with a different girl (Kimberley Davies) at a party. At the same party, Monica and Rachel were visiting and Chandler made-out with Rachel to get back at Ross. Ross is upset because this is also the night of the first kiss between him and Rachel but later finds out he actually kissed Monica. Joey is a guest star on the television game show Pyramid and does horribly. Joey nearly redeems himself in the final round but messes up on the final question, which costs him the game. Note: Originally aired as a 42-minute episode. Guest stars Ellen Pompeo as Missy Goldberg, Gregory Jbara as Gene Lester, and Donny Osmond
230	12	"The One with Phoebe's Wedding"	Kevin S. Bright	Robert Carlock & Dana Klein Borkow	February 12, 2004	176262	25.90	11.4/29
Phoebe's wedding to Mike is nearly upon the gang, and wedding planner Monica is going overboard, much to everyone's irritation. Eventually it gets too much for Phoebe who fires her intending to do the job herself. Meanwhile, Phoebe has also asked Joey to give her away, causing him to give Mike more than a few warnings about Phoebe's welfare. Ross and Chandler also find they're not part of the wedding party but compete when one of Mike's groomsmen drops out and he offers to let one of them fill the position. A freak blizzard hits New York and it becomes obvious the wedding will have to be postponed, but Phoebe and Mike decide to get married outside with a still-ordained Joey acting as minister and Phoebe rehires Monica knowing she can pull it all off in time. Mike tells Ross and Chandler that he has decided to allow his family dog to fill in the vacant groomsman position but still needs one of them to walk the dog down the aisle and Chandler's fear of dogs allows Ross to fill the role only while Chandler fills in for Joey giving Phoebe away. In the end, everything works out and Phoebe has the wedding of her dreams in the snow-filled street outside Central Perk. Note: Originally aired as a 42-minute episode.
231	13	"The One Where Joey Speaks French"	Gary Halvorson	Sherry Bilsing-Graham & Ellen Plummer	February 19, 2004	176261	24.27	11.0/29
Phoebe tries to teach Joey how to speak French for a play. Rachel's dad has a heart attack, so she goes to Long Island, accompanied by Ross, to visit him, which leads Rachel to want sympathy sex with Ross, but he turns her down since he thinks it is not a good idea. Rachel, the next morning, becomes mad at Ross because of this, so he says they should never have sex again, saying it is "off the table". Back in the city, Rachel again thanks Ross for coming with her and addresses the comment about their history of sleeping together. Rachel says for her and Ross, it is "never off the table", confusing him and he leaves. Meanwhile, Monica and Chandler's birth mother, Erica, comes for a visit and reveals that the father of her baby may be a father killer, as he killed his father with a shovel; the father turns out to be another guy she slept with.
232	14	"The One with Princess Consuela"	Gary Halvorson	Story by : Robert Carlock; Teleplay by : Tracy Reilly	February 26, 2004	176263	22.83	10.6/27
Rachel has an interview in a restaurant for Gucci however her boss from Ralph Lauren catches her when he ends up at the next table and she ends up fired, with her erratic behaviour in front of the Gucci representative (Brent Spiner) causing her to not get that job either. By a twist of fate she bumps into her old colleague Mark from Bloomingdale's who arranges for her an interview which she passes, only for the job offer to be from Louis Vuitton in Paris. Newly married Phoebe tries to change her name to Phoebe Hannigan, but after learning from a government worker (Craig Robinson) that she can change her name to whatever she wants, she changes it to "Princess Consuela Bananahammock", but insists that her friends call her Valerie. Mike is unimpressed by this, and decides to make a point by changing his name to "Crap Bag". Eventually Princess Consuela gets it and changes her name again to Phoebe Buffay-Hannigan, though she originally wanted to keep Bananahammock until Mike told her that it is a speedo. Meanwhile, Monica and Chandler plead with a depressed Joey to see their new prospective house, and he meets an eight-year-old girl (Dakota Fanning) who makes him realize he needs to let them go.
233	15	"The One Where Estelle Dies"	Gary Halvorson	Story by : Mark Kunerth; Teleplay by : David Crane & Marta Kauffman	April 22, 2004	176264	22.64	10.3/31
Joey's agent Estelle dies, but the group does not want to tell him as it could push him over the edge after all the recent changes he's witnessed. Phoebe impersonates Estelle's voice and pretends to still be alive to try to get Joey to fire her, but Joey ends up terrified when he gets a phone call from 'Estelle' after learning about her death. While being shown their new home by their realtor (Jane Lynch), Monica and Chandler are horrified to find that Janice (Maggie Wheeler) is considering buying the house next door to them, leading Chandler to take drastic measures to ensure she does not move in. Ross tries to get Rachel her old job back so she will not have to move to Paris. However, when he succeeds, Rachel becomes upset that, although she will not have to leave her friends, she will not be able to visit the 'Fashion Capital of the World'. In the end, Ross persuades her to do what she wants to do. Note: This is Maggie Wheeler's last appearance as Janice.
234	16	"The One with Rachel's Going Away Party"	Gary Halvorson	Andrew Reich & Ted Cohen	April 29, 2004	176265	24.51	11.2/32
As Erica arrives in New York to prepare for the baby's birth, the gang holds Rachel's going away party, during which she gives each of her friends an individual goodbye, moving them all to tears, except for Ross, leaving him hurt and wondering why she does not say goodbye to him. Rachel later reveals to Ross that with their history, it would be too difficult for her to say goodbye to him, and the emotional argument that follows leads to them sleeping together. Monica and Chandler start packing up their apartment and Chandler finds a pair of handcuffs and tries to find out who they belong to. Erica goes into labor, leading Chandler and Monica to rush her to the hospital.
235	17	"The Last One"	Kevin S. Bright	Marta Kauffman & David Crane	May 6, 2004 (Note: These episodes originally aired as a single double-length episode but are sometimes split into two episodes for syndication, reruns and DVD presentation.)	176266	52.46	24.9/54
236	18	"The Last One"	Kevin S. Bright	Marta Kauffman & David Crane	May 6, 2004	176267	52.46	24.9/54
After having sex with Ross, Rachel says it was "the perfect way to say goodbye", and he realizes he is still in love with her. Phoebe and Joey pack Monica and Chandler's belongings as the couple accompany Erica to the hospital. Ross and Phoebe race to the airport and he tells Rachel of his feelings – but she gets on the plane anyway. Resigned, Ross heads to his apartment where he hears a voicemail from Rachel professing her love for him but the call disconnects as Rachel asks to be let off the plane. Ross wonders if she managed to get off but she shows up at his doorstep. After years of separation, the two finally get back together for good, saying "This is it", hinting they will marry after the series (which is further hinted at in the spin-off, Joey). Meanwhile, Erica gives birth to twins whom Chandler and Monica name Jack and Erica. Back at Monica's apartment, the six friends turn in their keys and go out for a cup of coffee together before Monica and Chandler leave for their new house. Finally, the series ends with the friends leaving and a camera panning the apartment and the city.

== Home media ==
An exclusive limited DVD edition of the finale was released in region 1 on May 11, 2004, only five days after the series finale premiere on NBC. The disc includes the broadcast and extended version of the two-part episode, the series' pilot and several other bonus features. For region 4, the limited DVD was also released in Latin America on September 14, 2004.

The complete tenth season was officially released on DVD in region 1 on March 8, 2005, as a four-disc DVD box set. The release includes the extended versions of every episode, three audio commentaries, an exclusive interview with the cast and producers about the final days at the set, multiple gag reels, a music video, and a video guide to season ten's guest stars. The bonus features included in the limited DVD version of the finale were not included into the official season set, except for the extended finale, which was the only feature included in both sets.

Season 10 was released on Blu-ray altogether with the rest of the series on the Complete Series releases. Special features included in the set were the original "super-sized" broadcast versions of several episodes from seasons 7, 9, and 10, apart from the original broadcast versions of every episode. The episodes from seasons 9 and 10 are presented in high definition, while the ones from season 7 are presented in standard definition.

Friends: The Series Finale - Exclusive Limited Edition
Set details		Special features
Extended and broadcast versions of the two-part series finale; 1 disc; English (Dolby 5.0 surround); English, Spanish and Portuguese subtitles (Latin-American region 4 version only); 94 minutes		"The Last One", both the broadcast and extended DVD versions; The 1994 pilot; 10 Years of Beginnings: the main-title segments of all 10 seasons; "I'll Be There for You" - music Video by The Rembrandts
Release dates
Region 1	Region 2	Region 4
May 11, 2004	N/A	September 14, 2004

Friends: The Complete Tenth Season
Set details		Special features
17 episodes (double-length finale); 4-disc set (DVD)/2 discs (Blu-ray); English (Dolby 5.0 surround) (DVD / English (Dolby Digital 5.1) (Blu-ray); English, French & Spanish subtitles (episodes only); Audio commentaries; 467 minutes (DVD); 444 minutes (Blu-ray)		Over 24 minutes of never-before-seen footage included on every episode (DVD Only); Friends Final Thoughts: The cast and producers reflect during their final days at work and after series production ends.; Producers' commentary on three episodes: "The One with the Late Thanksgiving", "The One Where the Stripper Cries" and "The Last One"; Multiple seasons' gag reels; All-new Matt LeBlanc "Joey Joey" music video; Friends of Friends: video guestbook; Original "super-sized" broadcast of several episodes in high-definition (Blu-ray only)
Release dates
Region 1	Region 2	Region 4
November 15, 2005	October 25, 2004	October 4, 2006

== Reception ==
Collider ranked the season Number 6 on their ranking of all ten Friends seasons, and named "The Last One" as its standout episode.
