= The One with the Princess Leia Fantasy =

- Friends episode
- Episode no.: Season 3 Episode 1
- Directed by: Gail Mancuso
- Written by: Michael Curtis & Gregory S. Malins
- Original air date: September 19, 1996

Guest appearances
- Elliott Gould as Jack Geller; Christina Pickles as Judy Geller; Maggie Wheeler as Janice

Episode chronology
← Previous "The One with Barry and Mindy's Wedding"	Next → "The One Where No One's Ready"

"The One with the Princess Leia Fantasy" is the season premiere of the third season and the 49th episode overall of the American television situation comedy Friends, which was broadcast on NBC on September 19, 1996. The plot has Ross (David Schwimmer) tell girlfriend Rachel (Jennifer Aniston) the titular fantasy. In subplots, Monica (Courteney Cox) tries to get over her break-up with Richard with the help of Phoebe (Lisa Kudrow), while Joey (Matt LeBlanc) has to cope with Chandler's (Matthew Perry) annoying girlfriend Janice being around.

The episode was directed by Gail Mancuso, written by Michael Curtis and Gregory S. Malins and guest stars Maggie Wheeler as Janice and Elliott Gould and Christina Pickles in cameos as Jack and Judy Geller.

== Plot ==
At Rachel's request, Ross tells her one of his sexual fantasies: the scene from Return of the Jedi, where Princess Leia is in the gold bikini. He then gets upset when he finds out Rachel told Phoebe about the fantasy. Rachel tells Ross that girls tell each other everything, and she is surprised that guys do not do the same. He and Chandler later decide to try it, but Chandler overshares when he reveals that sometimes he sees his mother's face when he is with a woman. Ross gets back at Chandler by sharing this news to Joey, who reveals to Chandler that he always pictures Chandler's mom when he is having sex, much to his embarrassment. Rachel borrows a gold bikini outfit much like Princess Leia's to fulfill Ross's fantasy but, thanks to Chandler, Ross cannot stop picturing his own mother.

Joey is annoyed to learn that Chandler has resumed his relationship with Janice and has no intention of breaking up with her this time. When Chandler buys tickets to the Rangers for the three of them, he confiscates the tickets because Joey cannot stand Janice, which is now a problem for Chandler as he is now crazy about her. Janice decides what Joey needs to get over his intense dislike of her is some bonding time and the two spend the day together. At the end of the day, Joey still cannot stand Janice but he tells Chandler he can now tolerate being in the same room as her, much to his relief.

Monica tries to get over her breakup with Richard but she has not slept for three days and keeps finding things and going to places that remind her of their relationship. Phoebe tries to help her relax, but with minimal success. After she breaks down in tears at the post office her father comes to comfort her. He reveals that Richard is also suffering as a result of the breakup, worse than his divorce. The fact that Richard misses her too is enough for Monica to finally fall asleep.

== Reception ==
Entertainment Weekly rated the episode B+, positively reacting to the scenes in which Joey plays along with Wheel of Fortune and Ross learns women tell each other everything, calling the latter "a relatable, comedically rich concept". The Monica subplot is not so well received, with EW calling it "a drag". The authors of Friends Like Us: The Unofficial Guide to Friends describe it as "a pretty low-key opening to the season ... compared to season two's opener" and see the episode as the starting point for the season's "descent into soap opera". The producers received a letter of appraisal from George Lucas, creator of Star Wars, who congratulated them on the "great" Princess Leia fantasy.
