= The One with the Football =

- Friends episode
- Episode no.: Season 3 Episode 9
- Directed by: Kevin S. Bright
- Written by: Ira Ungerleider
- Production code: 465259
- Original air date: November 21, 1996

Guest appearance
- Susanna Voltaire as Margha

Episode chronology
← Previous "The One with the Giant Poking Device"	Next → "The One Where Rachel Quits"
- Friends season 3

"The One with the Football" is the ninth episode of Friends' third season. It first aired on the NBC network in the United States on November 21, 1996. The episode was written by Ira Ungerleider and directed by Kevin S. Bright.

== Plot ==
The girls are cooking Thanksgiving dinner, while the guys watch football. When the girls complain that the guys are not helping, they start discussing the game. Joey suggests the gang play a game of football in the park. Rachel and Phoebe think this is a great idea – even though neither of them have ever played football before. Chandler refuses at first, since he is still distraught over his breakup with Janice. Joey points out that Chandler has not wanted to do anything since the breakup, and this will be an excellent way to start getting over her. Monica and Ross initially refuse too – they had been banned from playing football by their parents. Every year, they used to have a touch football game called the "Geller Bowl". During Geller Bowl VI, Monica broke Ross's nose – thus spurring the banishment, and their father throwing the "trophy" in a lake. They finally decide one game could not hurt, and go to the park to play.

Monica and Ross name themselves team captains – Monica picks Joey and Phoebe; Ross picks Chandler and Rachel, who was upset that she was picked last. Then, she gets upset because Ross keeps telling her to "go long." It does not take long for the Geller siblings' rivalry to come out, and they spend the game at war with each other. Monica reveals that she fished the "Geller Cup" – a Troll doll nailed to a 2x4 – out of the lake while Ross was taken to the emergency room. They decide to play for the "Cup", and Rachel gets even more upset when Ross "trades" her to Monica's team for Joey.

Joey and Chandler meet a pretty Dutch girl named Margha, who is in the park because her roommate is having sex with a businessman. They spend the game competing for her affections. Ross, sick of their fighting, asks her to pick one. She picks Chandler, after it is revealed that Joey does not know where Dutch people come from, but rescinds her choice when Chandler starts gloating.

During the last play of the game, Monica throws it to Rachel – who almost scores a touchdown. Once the gang realizes the ball is still in play, Monica and Ross dive for the ball and refuse to let go. They end up staying there most of the night, while the rest of the gang goes back to the apartment to enjoy dinner. Rachel and Phoebe had so much fun playing football, they wonder if there is a league they can join in their free time away from work. Meanwhile, Ross and Monica briefly stop their fight to admire the snowfall but eventually, continue on their fight again.

== Production ==
The football scenes were challenging to film on the Warner Bros. Studios lot in Burbank due to their setting in a New York City park. The initial plan was to actually shoot the scenes outdoors, but lighting and sound issues made this unworkable. Production designer John Shaffner was forced to set up a second indoor stage in a short time period, placing apartment buildings on both sides of the park and using upside-down carpet padding as the "ground" to maintain the outdoor illusion. Shaffner took the unusual step of creating a full color model of the set to show producers how it could be shot. Director Kevin S. Bright, who considers the episode to be one of his favorites, notes that the live studio audience was actually moved from one stage to the other during filming.

== Reception ==
- Purple Clover placed the episode on their list of "20 Funniest Episodes of Friends".
- GamesRadar+ ranked "The One with the Football" the 24th best Friends episode.
- Telegraph & Argus ranked it #103 on their ranking of the 236 Friends episodes.
- Sam Ashurst from Digital Spy ranked it #104 on their ranking of the 236 Friends episodes.
