= List of Friends and Joey characters =

Various characters appeared in the sitcom Friends and its spin-off series Joey, which respectively aired for ten seasons and two seasons on NBC from 1994 to 2006. Friends featured six main cast members: Rachel Green (Jennifer Aniston), Monica Geller (Courteney Cox), Phoebe Buffay-Hannigan (Lisa Kudrow), Joey Tribbiani (Matt LeBlanc), Chandler Bing (Matthew Perry), and Ross Geller (David Schwimmer), while Joey featured LeBlanc in the title role reprising his role as Tribbiani alongside Gina Tribbiani (Drea de Matteo), Alex Garrett (Andrea Anders), Michael Tribbiani (Paulo Costanzo), Bobbie Morganstern (Jennifer Coolidge), Zach Miller (Miguel A. Núñez Jr.), and Howard (Ben Falcone). Many well-known actors guest-starred on both series throughout their combined 12-year run.

== Ensemble cast ==
The main cast members of Friends were familiar to U.S. television viewers before their roles on the series, but were not considered to be stars. Series creator David Crane wanted all six characters to be equally prominent, and the series was lauded as being "the first true 'ensemble' show".

The cast members made efforts to keep the ensemble format and not allow one member to dominate; they entered themselves in the same acting categories for awards, opted for collective instead of individual salary negotiations, and asked to appear together on magazine cover photos in the first season. The cast members became best friends off screen, and one guest star, Tom Selleck, reported sometimes feeling left out. The cast remained good friends after the series' run, notably Cox and Aniston, with Aniston being godmother to Cox and David Arquette's daughter, Coco. In the official farewell commemorative book Friends 'Til the End, each separately acknowledged in their respective interview that the cast had become their family.

=== Salaries ===
In their original contracts for the first season, the main cast were paid $22,500 per episode. The cast members received different salaries in the second season, ranging from $25,000 to $40,000 per episode, with Jennifer Aniston and David Schwimmer being the highest paid. Prior to their salary negotiations for the third season, the cast decided to enter collective negotiations, despite Warner Bros.' preference for individual deals. The main cast were paid $75,000 per episode for the third season, $85,000 for the fourth, $100,000 for the fifth, and $125,000 for the sixth. They received $750,000 per episode for the seventh and eighth seasons, and $1 million per episode for the ninth and tenth seasons. The cast also receive syndication royalties beginning with the fifth season.

=== Overview ===
Character	Portrayed by	Friends										Joey	
Character	Portrayed by	1	2	3	4	5	6	7	8	9	10	1	2
Rachel Green	Jennifer Aniston	Main	Main	Main	Main	Main	Main	Main	Main	Main	Main		
Monica Geller	Courteney Cox	Main	Main	Main	Main	Main	Main	Main	Main	Main	Main		
Phoebe Buffay	Lisa Kudrow	Main	Main	Main	Main	Main	Main	Main	Main	Main	Main		
Ursula Buffay	Lisa Kudrow	(Note: Kudrow only appears as Ursula Buffay in two episodes of the first season and a single episode each season from the third through eighth. However, Kudrow as Phoebe is credited as a main cast member.)											
Joey Tribbiani	Matt LeBlanc	Main	Main	Main	Main	Main	Main	Main	Main	Main	Main	Main	Main
Chandler Bing	Matthew Perry	Main	Main	Main	Main	Main	Main	Main	Main	Main	Main		
Ross Geller	David Schwimmer	Main	Main	Main	Main	Main	Main	Main	Main	Main	Main		
Russ	David Schwimmer		Guest (Note: Schwimmer only appears as Russ in a single episode in Season 2, credited as "Snaro".)										
Gunther	James Michael Tyler	Recurring	Recurring	Recurring	Recurring	Recurring	Recurring	Recurring	Recurring	Recurring	Recurring		
Gina Tribbiani	Drea de Matteo			Guest (Note: Gina is initially played by K.J. Steinberg in a guest role on Friends.)								Main	Main
Alex Garrett	Andrea Anders											Main	Main
Michael Tribbiani	Paulo Costanzo											Main	Main
Bobbie Morganstern	Jennifer Coolidge										Guest (Note: Coolidge initially appears in a guest role on Friends as Amanda Buffamonteezi.)	Main	Main
Howard	Ben Falcone											Main	Main
Zach Miller	Miguel A. Núñez Jr.												Main

=== Family trees ===
Geller–Bing-Green family tree

Nora Bing	Charles Bing (Note: Chandler's gay drag queen father, Charles Bing, is revealed to go by the Las Vegas stage name "Helena Handbasket" in "The One with Chandler's Dad".)	Jack Geller	Judy Geller	Sandra Green	Leonard Green
Erica (Note: In "The One with the Birth Mother", Erica agrees to let Monica and Chandler Bing adopt her babies, giving birth in "The One with Rachel's Going Away Party" and "The Last One".)	Chandler Bing	Monica Geller–Bing	Carol Willick	Ross Geller (Note: Both of Ross's children, Ben and Emma, were respectively born sometime after his divorces with their mothers, Carol Willick and Rachel Green (before remarrying the latter).) (Note: Ross was additionally briefly married to Emily Waltham, from "The One with Ross's Wedding" until "The One with the Yeti".)	Rachel Green	Amy Green
Erica Bing	Jack Bing	Ben Geller	Emma Geller	Jill Green

Notes:

Buffay family tree

Frances
Mrs. Buffay (Note: In "The One With the Bullies", Mrs Buffay (played by Laraine Newman) is seen as Frank Jr's mother.)	Frank Buffay Sr. (Note: In "The One at the Beach", it is revealed that Phoebe's Biological Mother Phoebe Abbott, Birth Father Frank Buffay Sr., and Adoptive Mother Lily Buffay were in a three-way relationship, with Lily and Frank Buffay Sr. raising her.)	Phoebe Abbott	Lily Buffay	Bitsy Hannigan	Theodore Hannigan
Alice Knight	Frank Buffay Jr.	Ursula Buffay	Duncan Sullivan	Phoebe Buffay (Note: In "The One with Phoebe's Uterus", Frank and Alice ask Phoebe to be a surrogate mother for their child, and she later gives birth to their triplets, whom she then says goodbye to in an emotional scene in "The One Hundredth".)	Michael "Mike" Hannigan
Frank Buffay Jr. Jr.	Leslie Buffay	Chandler Buffay

Notes:

Tribbiani family tree

Nonna	Nonnie
Gloria Tribbiani	Joseph Tribbiani Sr.
Jimmy Costa	Gina Tribbiani	Alex Garrett	Joey Tribbiani	Zach Miller	Cookie Tribbiani	Mary-Therese "Mary Teresa" Tribbiani	Dina Tribbiani	Bobby Corso
Michael Tribbiani	Tina Tribbiani	Mary-Angela Tribbiani	Veronika Tribbiani	Baby Corso

== Main characters ==
=== Friends ===
All six main actors in Friends had prior experience in situation comedy, and, in some cases, improvisational comedy as well. All six actors appear in every episode.

==== Rachel Green ====
Rachel Karen Green (Jennifer Aniston) is the spoiled but warm-hearted and likable daughter of Dr. Leonard Green (Ron Leibman), a rich, Long Island vascular surgeon, and Sandra Green (Marlo Thomas). She has two sisters, Jill (Reese Witherspoon) and Amy (Christina Applegate). Rachel is introduced into the series in the first episode after she leaves her fiancé, Barry Farber, at the altar, and attempts to live independently without financial support from her parents. She flees from her almost-wedding to New York City to find Monica Geller, her friend from high school. Rachel moves into Monica's apartment and meets Phoebe Buffay and Joey Tribbiani. Rachel already knows Ross Geller, Monica's brother, as all three attended Lincoln High School. In the first episode, she is also reacquainted with Chandler Bing, Ross's college roommate; however, later episodes retcon this, and she is shown to have met Chandler on Thanksgiving, whilst Ross was at college. Rachel's first job is as a waitress at Central Perk coffee house. She later begins to work in fashion, becoming an assistant buyer, and later a personal shopper, at Bloomingdale's. She eventually becomes a buyer at Polo Ralph Lauren.

A great deal of Rachel's life throughout the series revolves around her relationship with Ross Geller. At the end of season seven, during Monica's and Chandler's wedding, it is revealed that Rachel is pregnant from a one-night stand with Ross. Initially, Rachel is determined to raise the baby on her own, but later she realizes she needs Ross's help. She decides to move in with Ross, even though the two are not involved in an intimate relationship. Their daughter is born during the eighth-season finale. Her aunt Monica, 'gives' an indecisive Rachel the name Emma, which she had chosen for her own daughter, at age 14.

During the tenth season, Rachel is offered a job with Louis Vuitton in Paris. She accepts and prepares to move herself and Emma to France. However, in the series finale, she declines the job offer and famously "gets off the plane". Rachel and Ross get back together in the final episode of the series.

==== Monica Geller ====
Monica Elizabeth Geller (Courteney Cox) is the younger sister of Ross and best friend of Rachel, the latter of whom she allows to live with her after Rachel forsakes her own wedding. She works primarily as a chef at a variety of restaurants. She is described as the mother hen of the group, and is known for her obsessive-compulsive and competitive nature. Monica is often jokingly teased by the others, especially Ross, for having been overweight as a teen.

In the second season, Monica falls for her father Jack's (Elliott Gould) friend, Richard Burke (Tom Selleck). Despite the twenty-one year age difference, Monica and Richard are happy, and her parents accept their relationship. However, as a result of Monica yearning for a family but Richard having already had one, they break up at the end of the second season. Monica then pursues a chain of various men until she unexpectedly begins a relationship with her longtime friend, Chandler Bing, at the end of the fourth season, during her brother Ross' wedding to Emily Waltham in London. Monica and Chandler try to hide their relationship from the rest of the group for much of the fifth season, but eventually everyone finds out. After celebrating their first anniversary in Las Vegas, they move in together and get engaged by the sixth-season finale. After their marriage, Monica and Chandler try to conceive children, only to discover that they are unable to do so. In the final season of the series, they adopt new-born twins, whom they name Erica and Jack.

==== Phoebe Buffay ====
Phoebe Buffay-Hannigan (Lisa Kudrow) is an odd, ditzy albeit sweet-natured masseuse who grew up homeless, sometimes telling her friends outlandish tales of life on the street. She is an aspiring musician who plays the guitar and sings songs with somewhat unusual lyrics at the coffee shop. She has an identical twin sister, Ursula Pamela Buffay (also played by Kudrow), who is just as odd as Phoebe and appeared as a recurring character on Mad About You. After a series of dates and relationships with a number of men, Phoebe meets Mike Hannigan (Paul Rudd) in season nine, whom she eventually marries in season ten. She also became a surrogate mother for her half-brother Frank Jr. (Giovanni Ribisi), giving birth to his triplets Frank Jr. Jr., Leslie & Chandler in the fifth season.

==== Joey Tribbiani ====
Joseph Francis "Joey" Tribbiani Jr. (Matt LeBlanc) is a good-natured but not-so-bright struggling actor and food lover, who becomes mildly famous for his role as Dr. Drake Ramoray on a fictionalized version of Days of Our Lives. Joey is a womanizer, with many girlfriends throughout the series, often using his catchphrase pick-up line "How you doin'?" He develops a crush on Rachel in season eight.

Prior to his role on Friends, LeBlanc appeared as a regular on the short-lived TV 101, a minor character in the sitcom Married... with Children, and as a main character in its spin-offs, Top of the Heap and Vinnie & Bobby. After Friends ended, LeBlanc portrayed Joey in a short-lived spin-off, Joey.

==== Chandler Bing ====
Chandler Muriel Bing (Matthew Perry) is an executive in statistical analysis and data reconfiguration for a large multi-national corporation. He later quits his job and becomes a junior copywriter at an advertising agency.

Chandler is known for his sarcastic sense of humor, and is often the wittiest member of the group. He often teases his best friend Joey for the latter's stupidity, and has been Ross's best friend since their freshman year in college. Chandler is often depicted as being somewhat of a hapless individual, suffering a lot of bad luck while struggling through life and occasionally struggling with an on-and-off smoking addiction. However, he eventually falls in deep mutual love with Monica and proposes to her at the close of season six, with the two of them marrying at the close of season seven. At the end of series, he and Monica adopt twins, whom they name Jack and Erica.

Like Aniston and LeBlanc, Perry had already appeared in several unsuccessful sitcom pilots before being cast. He had also starred in the television series Second Chance and Sydney.

==== Ross Geller ====
Ross Eustace Geller, PhD (David Schwimmer) is a paleontologist at a museum of prehistory, and later a professor of paleontology at New York University. Considered by some to be the most intelligent of the six main characters, but at the same time a clumsy, quirky man, Ross is known for being a smart, know-it-all who prides himself on his rationality, despite his clear hopeless romanticism. He is shown to be the most caring of all six members in various instances on the show, but also shown to be the most neurotic and his insecurities often get him into trouble.

Ross is Monica's older brother, Chandler's college roommate, and Rachel's on-again, off-again boyfriend. His first marriage has already failed by the time the show begins, with his second lasting mere weeks. The second divorce seemed to greatly depress him and make him quick-tempered near the start of season five, such as when he screams at his colleague for taking his sandwich and throwing it away. After he gets Ugly Naked Guy's apartment, he is offered to return to work, but he loses his temper again when he sees Chandler and Monica having sex through his window, becoming the last one to find out about their relationship. He also drunkenly married Rachel in Las Vegas, after which they unsuccessfully tried to annul it and had to settle for a divorce, which became Ross' third one. Ross's relationship with Rachel is a major storyline throughout the series. He is also the father of his ex-wife Carol's son, Ben, and Rachel's daughter, Emma. In the series finale, Ross and Rachel finally reconcile, deciding to be together once and for all.

The character of Ross was developed with David Schwimmer in the minds of writers and Schwimmer was also the first actor to be cast on the show.

Before being cast in Friends, Schwimmer played minor characters in The Wonder Years and NYPD Blue; his first regular series role was in the sitcom Monty. Schwimmer is the only cast member native to New York City.

Ross Geller was also voted as the best character on Friends in a poll conducted by Comedy Central UK.

=== Joey ===
==== Gina Tribbiani ====
Gina Tribbiani (Drea de Matteo) is Joey's attractive older sister, whom Joey comes to live with in Los Angeles during Joey. Temperamental, promiscuous and not particularly bright but very street-wise, Gina is a caring but over-protective and domineering mother. For years she convinced her genius son Michael that he was born when she was 22 instead of 16 years old, and always says he is the one thing she has done well. She and Joey are friends in addition to being siblings, both having the gift of being extremely appealing to the opposite sex, with numerous lovers. Initially working as a hairdresser, by season two she works as a secretary for Joey's agent Bobbie, having impressed Bobbie with her brash manner. Gina is shown to be jealous of her youngest sister, Mary-Therese, claiming that she always has got everything she wanted because she is the baby, but in the same episode proved she still cares for her sister.

In season two Michael's father Jimmy comes back, and he and Gina begin dating again. At the end of season two, they get married. In the season 2 episode "Joey and the Holding Hands", it is implied that Gina may be bisexual.

==== Alex Garrett ====
Alexis "Alex" Garrett (Andrea Anders) is Joey's next-door neighbor, landlady and friend in Joey. She is an educated, but slightly ditzy, blonde lawyer who graduated from Northwestern University and Pepperdine University School of Law. Initially intimidated, but also intrigued by Joey's tough street-wise older sister Gina, the two women eventually become friends and she becomes more bold in the way she dresses and acts, thanks to Gina's influence. She is puzzled but impressed by Joey's intuitive gift at being able to know when she is wearing thong panties and spends most of her time hanging out at Joey and Michael's apartment. She and Joey bond and become close friends. Her husband is a professional orchestra musician and is away from home most of the time and she confides her problems with her marriage in Joey. At the end of season one, she and Joey become romantically involved during her separation from her husband.

In season two, Alex becomes romantically interested in Joey and has a crush on him for a long period. Gina tries to help her to get over Joey, but once Alex starts dating Joey's friend Dean, Joey soon realizes that he is also in love with Alex. Alex and Joey start dating in season 2 and shortly before the final episode they become engaged.

Matt LeBlanc and Andrea Anders dated in real life for several years after the cancellation of Joey.

==== Michael Tribbiani ====
Michael Tribbiani (Paulo Costanzo) is Joey's nephew who idolizes his Uncle Joey's ability to date many women, and who himself is sheltered and nervous around girls. He is self-conscious that he has been so sheltered and that his mother Gina breast fed him until he was seven. He is a huge Star Trek: The Next Generation and Star Wars fan. He is extremely intelligent, an aerospace engineer, attends Caltech and specialises in applied thermodynamics, works with his rival Seth frequently on engineering projects, and is an obvious direct opposite from his more street-wise mother and uncle. He turns to Joey as a big brother and substitute father figure, even after his biological father Jimmy re-enters mother Gina's love life.

==== Bobbie Morganstern ====
Roberta "Bobbie" Morganstern (Jennifer Coolidge) is Joey's oversexed agent whom he hires after Estelle Leonard's death, and reportedly the twelfth most powerful woman in Hollywood. She has an enormous crush on Joey's nephew Michael. She often entertains herself by making her office assistant do funny tricks, or shocking herself with a stun-gun. She is brash, forward, aggressive, highly entertaining and slightly ditzy, laughing at everything and at anyone's expense, including her client Joey's. She was once sued by Phil Collins.

==== Howard Peckerman ====
Howard Peckerman (Ben Falcone) is Joey's friend and neighbor in Joey. He is quite odd and quirky.

==== Zach Miller ====
Zach Miller (Miguel A. Núñez Jr.) is an actor who joins the cast and becomes one of Joey's best friends in the second season of Joey. Zach has an interesting career, going from playing extras on TV, to directing amateur plays. Zach does not appear to have a home; he was seen at one time living in Joey's trailer while working on a major blockbuster movie. In one episode, Zach and Joey, both drunk, get married in Tijuana, in a parody of Ross and Rachel marrying each other in the season-five finale of Friends. Zach's final appearance was in "Joey and the Big Move". Núñez was absent from the last five episodes, including the finale of the series, because he found another job. Zach's absence within the show was not mentioned, nor was the character at all.

== Characters recurring throughout series ==
Character	Actor	Season									
Character	Actor	1	2	3	4	5	6	7	8	9	10
Recurring characters
Gunther	James Michael Tyler	Recurring	Recurring	Recurring	Recurring	Recurring	Recurring	Recurring	Recurring	Recurring	Recurring
Janice Litman-Goralnik	Maggie Wheeler	Recurring	Recurring	Recurring	Guest	Guest	Guest	Guest	Recurring	Guest	Guest
Carol Willick	Jane Sibbett (Note: Carol was portrayed by Anita Barone in the show's second episode. Subsequent episodes featured Sibbett in the role.)	Recurring	Recurring	Recurring	Guest	Recurring	Recurring	Guest			
Judy Geller	Christina Pickles	Recurring	Recurring	Guest	Recurring	Recurring	Guest	Recurring	Recurring	Guest	Guest
Jack Geller	Elliott Gould	Recurring	Recurring	Guest	Guest	Recurring	Guest	Recurring	Recurring	Guest	Guest
Susan Bunch	Jessica Hecht	Recurring	Recurring	Guest	Guest		Guest				
Marcel	Katie	Recurring	Recurring								
Barry Farber	Mitchell Whitfield	Recurring	Guest				Recurring				
Mr. Heckles	Larry Hankin	Recurring	Guest	Guest							
Paolo	Cosimo Fusco	Recurring	Guest								
Ben Geller	Cole Sprouse	Guest	Recurring	Recurring	Recurring	Recurring	Guest	Recurring	Recurring		
Estelle Leonard	June Gable	Guest	Recurring	Guest		Guest	Recurring	Guest	Guest		Guest
Julie	Lauren Tom	Guest	Recurring								
Mindy Hunter	Jennifer Grey; Jana Marie Hupp	Guest	Guest								
Fun Bobby	Vincent Ventresca	Guest	Guest								
Terry	Max Wright	Guest	Guest								
Mr. Douglas	Dorien Wilson	Guest	Guest								
Jasmine	Cynthia Mann	Guest		Recurring	Guest						
Kiki	Michele Maika	Guest		Guest							
Nora Tyler Bing	Morgan Fairchild	Guest				Guest		Recurring	Guest		
David	Hank Azaria	Guest						Guest		Recurring	
Steve	Jon Lovitz	Guest								Guest	
Frank Buffay Jr.	Giovanni Ribisi		Recurring	Recurring	Recurring	Guest					Guest
Richard Burke	Tom Selleck		Recurring	Guest			Recurring				
Mr. Treeger	Mike Hagerty		Recurring		Recurring				Guest		
Sandra Green	Marlo Thomas		Recurring						Guest		
Eddie Menuek	Adam Goldberg		Recurring								
Dr. Mike Horton	Roark Critchlow		Recurring								
Joanna	Alison La Placa		Guest	Recurring							
Dr. Leonard Green	Ron Leibman		Guest	Guest					Guest		Guest
The Duck	N/A			Recurring	Recurring	Recurring	Recurring	Guest			
The Chick	N/A			Recurring	Recurring	Recurring	Recurring				
Sophie	Laura Dean			Recurring	Recurring						
Bonnie	Christine Taylor			Recurring	Guest						
Mark Robinson	Steven Eckholdt			Recurring							Guest
Pete Becker	Jon Favreau			Recurring							
Kate Miller	Dina Meyer			Recurring							
Marshall Townend	Reg Rogers			Recurring							
Lauren	Jennifer Milmore			Recurring							
Mr. Kaplan Jr.	Shelley Berman			Recurring							
Chloe	Angela Featherstone			Recurring							
Isaac	Maury Ginsberg			Recurring							
Alice Knight Buffay	Debra Jo Rupp			Guest	Recurring	Guest					
Phoebe Abbot Sr.	Teri Garr			Guest	Recurring						
Doug	Sam McMurray			Guest		Guest			Guest		
Ugly Naked Guy	Jon Haugen			Guest		Guest					
Dina Tribbiani	Lisa Melilli; Marla Sokoloff			Guest					Guest		
Emily Waltham	Helen Baxendale				Recurring	Recurring					
Kathy	Paget Brewster				Recurring						
Joshua Burgin	Tate Donovan				Recurring						
Mr. Waltham	Paxton Whitehead				Recurring						
Stephen Waltham	Tom Conti				Guest	Guest					
Andrea Waltham	Jennifer Saunders				Guest	Guest					
Stu	Fred Stoller				Guest				Guest		
The Croupier	Rick Pasqualone					Recurring	Guest				
Gary	Michael Rapaport					Recurring					
Danny	George Newbern					Recurring					
Dr. Ledbetter	Michael Ensign					Recurring					
Randall	Thomas Lennon					Recurring					
The Triplets (Frank Jr Jr, Leslie, & Chandler)	Dante Pastula, Allisyn Arm, & Sierra Marcoux					Guest	Guest				Guest
Kim Clozzi	Joanna Gleason					Guest	Guest				
Helena Handbasket (formerly Charles Bing)	Kathleen Turner					Guest		Recurring	Guest		
Mr. Zelner	Steve Ireland					Guest		Guest	Guest	Guest	Recurring
Janine Lecroix	Elle Macpherson						Recurring				
Jill Green	Reese Witherspoon						Recurring				
Elizabeth Stevens	Alexandra Holden						Recurring				
Paul Stevens	Bruce Willis						Recurring				
Russell	Ron Glass						Recurring				
Dr. Roger	Pat Finn						Recurring				
Tag Jones	Eddie Cahill							Recurring	Guest		
Jake	Troy Norton							Recurring			
Richard Crosby	Gary Oldman							Recurring			
Mona	Bonnie Somerville								Recurring		
Dr. Long	Amanda Carlin								Recurring		
Eric	Sean Penn								Recurring		
Parker	Alec Baldwin								Recurring		
Emma Geller-Green	Cali & Noelle Sheldon								Guest	Recurring	Recurring
Mike Hannigan	Paul Rudd									Recurring	Recurring
Charlie Wheeler	Aisha Tyler									Recurring	Recurring
Gavin Mitchell	Dermot Mulroney									Recurring	
Steve	Phill Lewis									Recurring	
Molly	Melissa George									Recurring	
Claudia	Monique Edwards									Recurring	
Ken	Brian Chenowith									Recurring	
Amy Green	Christina Applegate									Guest	Guest
Clifford Burnett	Eddie McClintock									Guest	Guest
Bitsy Hannigan	Cristine Rose									Guest	Guest
Theodore Hannigan	Gregory Itzin									Guest	Guest
The Waiter	Sam Pancake									Guest	Guest
Erica	Anna Faris										Recurring
Jack and Erica Bing	unknown										Recurring

Each of the following characters of Friends may or may not be particularly significant to the story of the series; each was introduced in one season and would usually appear in subsequent seasons.

=== Introduced in Season 1 ===
==== Gunther ====
Gunther (James Michael Tyler): The manager of the Central Perk coffee house, who first appears as a background character in "The One with the Sonogram at the End". He is a former actor who once played Bryce on All My Children before that character was "killed in an avalanche." Gunther develops an unrequited crush on Rachel in the third season, which he keeps to himself until "The Last One". Apart from Ross, whom he dislikes, he is on reasonably good terms with the rest of the gang despite occasionally being annoyed by wacky antics or comments from them. His motivation for disliking Ross is jealousy (as he is aware of Ross's relationship with Rachel), which is made clear numerous times, most notably in "The One with the Morning After" when he reveals to Rachel that Ross slept with another woman while Rachel was on a break from their relationship. Gunther appears in a majority of the episodes, but only occasionally calls attention to himself and almost never has a large role in the plot of an episode. In "The One with The Stain", Gunther is shown to be fluent in Dutch (although with a strong American accent), calling Ross an "ezel" as he converses with him.

James Michael Tyler was cast as Gunther because he was the only extra who could competently work the cappuccino machine on the Central Perk set. Tyler appears as Gunther in a co-host voice-over in the Friends trivia game for PS2, PC and Xbox, and in the board game Friends: Scene It?. The Seattle Times ranked Gunther as the eighth best guest character of the series in 2004. When asked in 2009 by Heatworld.com what Gunther would be doing "now", Tyler joked, "He'd probably have a very traditional marriage, with lots of white-haired babies running around with hair brighter than the sun." Aside from the main cast, he appears in the most episodes.

==== Jack and Judy Geller ====
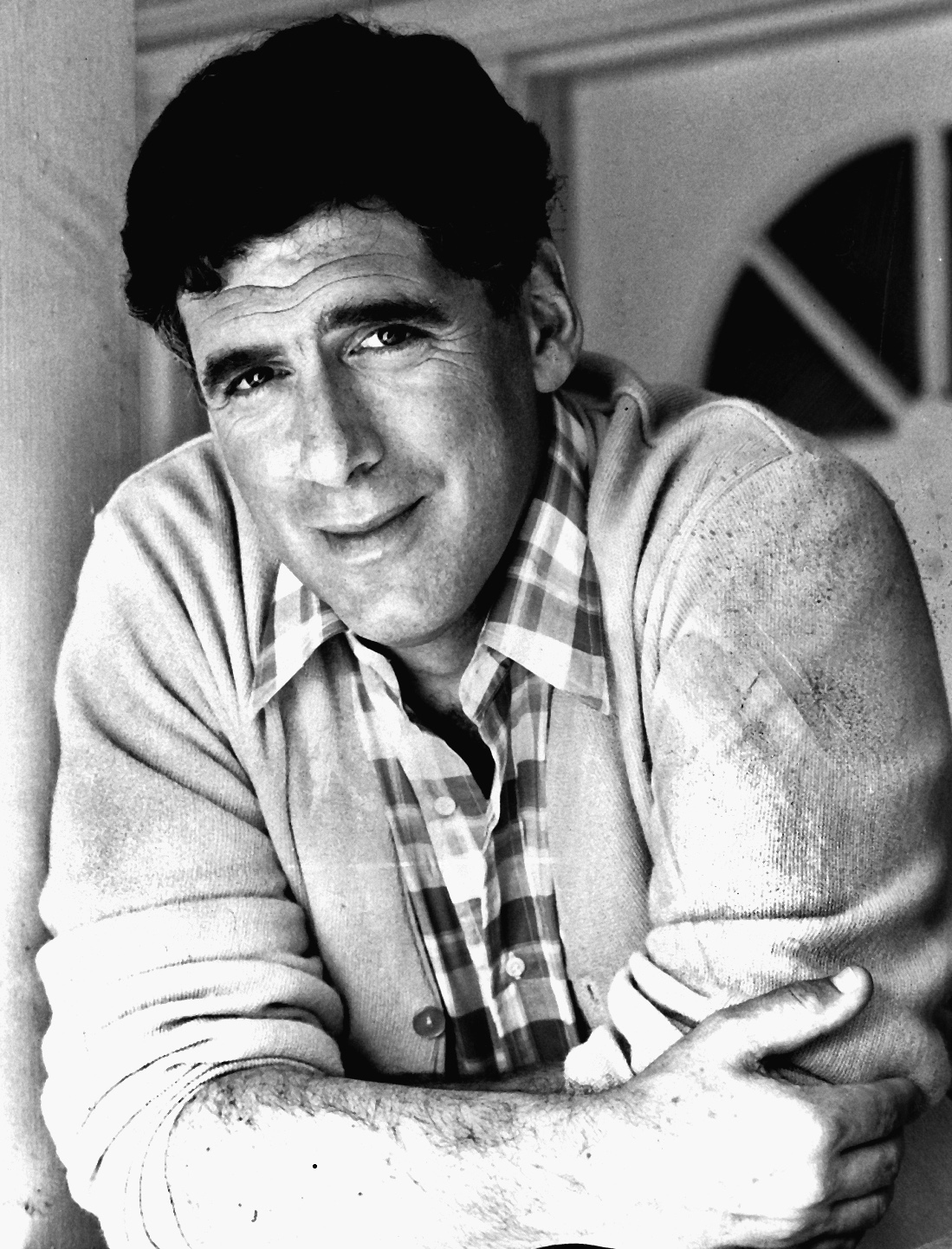
Elliott Gould portrayed Jack Geller, Ross and Monica's father, in 20 episodes, spanning from 1994 to 2003.

Jack (Elliott Gould) and Judy Geller (Christina Pickles): Ross and Monica's parents. In early appearances, Jack frequently makes inappropriate comments, which he punctuates by exclaiming "I'm just saying...!", while Judy makes condescending remarks about Monica's lack of a love life and sometimes forgets her daughter even exists, while overtly favoring Ross. Jack is more balanced in his attention and care towards both Ross and Monica, though after the Gellers sell their house in season 7, it is revealed that Jack used boxes of Monica's old stuff to block rainwater from getting to his Porsche. As penance, Jack decides to gift Monica the Porsche.

Despite each of them having their own quirks, they are occasionally dumbfounded by the crazy antics of their son and daughter, such as Ross' disastrous wedding to Emily and Monica's ridiculous speech at their 35th anniversary party. They are also sometimes bemused by the antics of the other four friends, such as idiotic or crazy comments from Phoebe and Joey, a revolting trifle cooked by Rachel, and Chandler entering a coed whirlpool alongside Jack without wearing anything underneath the towel wrapped around his waist. In the season 10 episode The One with The Cake, the couple record a message for their granddaughter's 18th birthday in which they state they might not be around by then.

Pickles was nominated for the Primetime Emmy Award for Outstanding Guest Actress in a Comedy Series for her appearance in "The One Where Nana Dies Twice" in 1995. In 2004, The Seattle Times ranked Jack and Judy jointly as the second best guest characters of the series.

==== Carol Willick and Susan Bunch ====
Carol Willick (Anita Barone for the character's debut episode, Jane Sibbett thereafter) and Susan Bunch (Jessica Hecht): Carol is Ross’s lesbian ex-wife, who came out before the pilot, and Susan is her partner. Carol divorced Ross to be with Susan. In the second episode of the series, Carol tells Ross that she is pregnant with his child, and is having the baby with her partner Susan, though she wishes Ross to be part of the baby's life. Carol and Susan are often bemused by Ross' behavior throughout his onscreen appearances with them. Though Ross and Carol are on good terms after their divorce, Ross resents Susan for losing Carol to her. Although Susan and Ross are initially, naturally enough, often at odds, they briefly put aside their differences when Carol gives birth to a boy, whom they all agree, after weeks of argument, to name Ben. Carol and Susan announce their plans to get married in "The One with the Lesbian Wedding", but Carol's parents refuse to attend the wedding, leading Carol to doubt her decision. Ross, initially hesitant to see his ex-wife remarry, finds himself in the position of being the one to encourage her to go ahead with the ceremony despite her parents' opposition. At the reception, Susan thanks Ross for his part in saving the wedding, and offers to dance with him; he agrees, apparently resolving their strained relationship. Carol and Susan make irregular appearances until "The One That Could Have Been" (Susan), and "The One with the Truth About London" (Carol).

Carol and Susan were based on creators Marta Kauffman and David Crane's best friends in New York: "We didn't create them for any particular political reason or because of lesbian chic. It was just an opportunity to tell a really interesting story." The characters were called a positive example of a gay couple on television by GLAAD. Jessica Hecht originally auditioned to play Monica.

==== Janice Litman-Goralnik ====
Janice Litman-Goralnik (née Hosenstein) (Maggie Wheeler): Chandler's on-again, off-again girlfriend for the first four seasons. Janice is one of the few supporting characters who appears in all of the Friends seasons (along with Gunther and Ross and Monica's parents). She has a distinctive nasal voice, a machine gun laugh, and a thick New York accent, all of which annoy the friends, especially Joey. She first appears in "The One with the East German Laundry Detergent", when Chandler breaks up with her (through Phoebe); he then invites her to New Year's in a moment of weakness, only to dump her again before midnight. She then shows up as Chandler's blind date the night before Valentine's Day where they sleep together; Chandler breaks up with her the next day but she is fine with it, telling him she knows they will meet again. In season two, in the wake of Mr. Heckles' death, Chandler resolves not to die alone and calls Janice, but is disappointed to discover that she is married and pregnant. In "The One with Barry and Mindy's Wedding", Chandler arranges a meeting with a mystery woman over the Internet, who turns out to be Janice, who reveals that her husband is having an affair with his secretary and that they are divorcing. To the surprise of the others, and to Joey's indignance, Chandler stays with Janice through the beginning of the third season, having fallen in love with her and no longer finding her annoying. Joey later sees Janice kissing her husband Gary while in the midst of their divorce and tells Chandler. Chandler confronts Janice, who admits that she loves both men. However, Joey implies to Chandler that were he in his position, he would not try to interfere with Janice being happy with the father of her child. This, combined with Chandler's lingering trauma from his own parents' divorce, leads to the end of their relationship in "The One with the Giant Poking Device" when Chandler urges Janice to go back to her husband, not wanting to destroy her family.

Following this, Janice becomes a running gag on the show, appearing in some form in one episode per season (two in season 8 when counting "The One Where Rachel Has a Baby" as two separate episodes) from season 4 onwards. When Janice returns to Chandler's life, having finally gotten divorced after her reconciliation fell through, Chandler finds her insufferable again, and pretends to move to Yemen to get away from her. In season five, Janice has a brief fling with Ross shortly after he has broken up with Emily, where he spends the entire date complaining about everything, causing her to find him insufferable and leave him, with the irony of the situation quickly dawning on him and persuading him to get his act together; she then implies to Joey that she will date him next. She later makes a voice cameo on a mix tape that Chandler plays for Monica, having passed it off as his own and not knowing Janice had made it for him. When Chandler and Monica become engaged, Janice re-enters their lives and, now mostly over Chandler, attempts to forcibly invite herself to the wedding; she only leaves when Monica states that Chandler still has feelings for her. When Ross and Rachel await the birth of their daughter Emma in season 8, Janice and her new, partially-deaf husband Sid are placed in the same labor room as Rachel; she gives birth to a son, Aaron, who she jokes will be Emma's future husband. She also strongly advises Rachel that Ross will not stay around to raise the baby if they are not married, citing how her own ex-husband is largely estranged from their daughter. In season 9, as Monica and Chandler make plans to have children, they go to a fertility clinic where Janice and Sid are coincidentally visiting; when Chandler worries about his sperm, she offers Chandler advice and support. In season 10, Janice and her family come close to buying a house next door to the one Monica and Chandler are buying; to get rid of her, Chandler once again pretends he still loves her, causing her to become fearful that they will end up ruining their marriages if she lives next door to him, so she decides not to buy the house after all. She leaves, seemingly for good, but does kiss him one last time before she goes.

Throughout the series, Janice enjoys spending time with the six friends, which is ironic and very inconvenient for them, since none of them can stand to be around her. She utters her catchphrase, "Ohhh—myyy—Gawd!", almost every time she re-enters the show, and Chandler sometimes imitates her with it. Janice's distinctive laugh was born out of a slip-up Wheeler made during the rehearsal of "The One with the East German Laundry Detergent"; after Chandler and Janice's "More latte?"/"No, I'm still working on mine" lines, Wheeler laughed. The Seattle Times ranked Janice as the best guest character of the series in 2004.

==== David ====
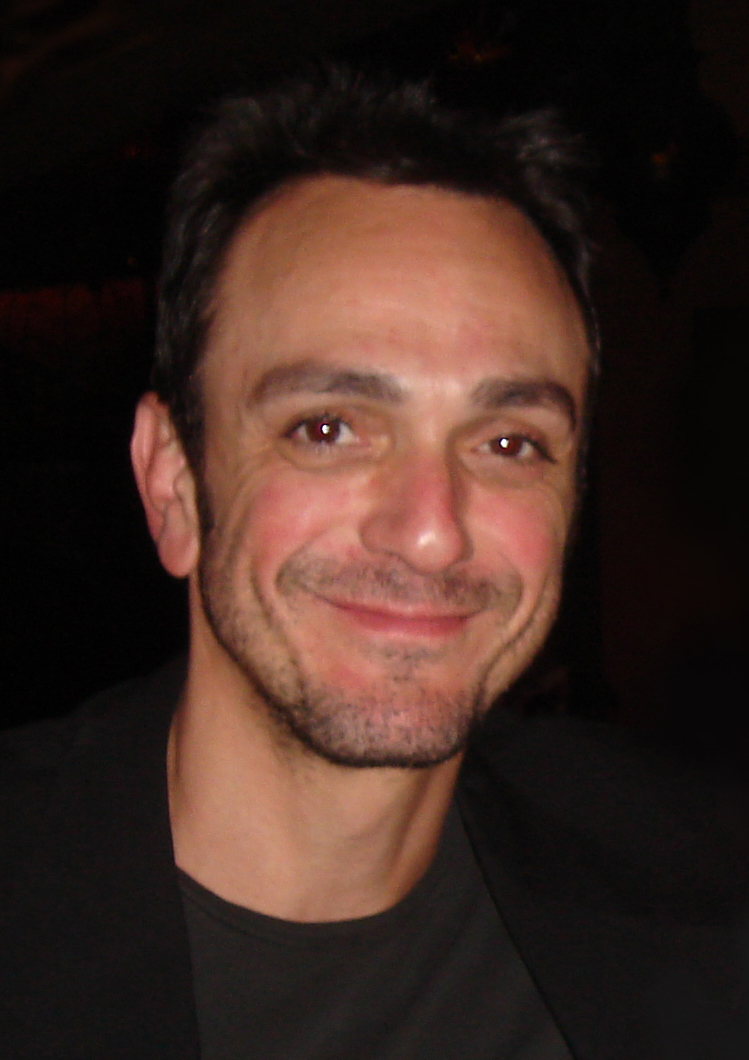
Hank Azaria played David, Phoebe's recurring love interest, in 1994, 2001 and 2003.

David, "the Scientist Guy" (Hank Azaria): a physicist with whom Phoebe falls in love in "The One with the Monkey", when he receives an academic grant for a three-year research trip to Minsk (incorrectly—and consistently—described in the scripts as being in Russia, rather than Belarus). After a quarrel with his research partner Max (Wayne Péré), Phoebe urges him to take the trip, even though it breaks her heart. Seven years later, he returns to New York for a brief visit and shares an evening with Phoebe, at the end of which he wants to say he loves her, but chooses not to as it will make it harder for him to leave. Two years later, he returns for another visit in "The One with the Male Nanny", where he kisses Phoebe before she admits she is seeing Mike Hannigan, who catches them together. He returns permanently in "The One with the Donor", having failed in his research, and when he finds out that Phoebe and Mike have broken up, he and Phoebe begin dating again. In "The One in Barbados—Part 1", David proposes to Phoebe but is turned down in favor of Mike.

In 2003, Azaria was nominated for the Primetime Emmy Award for Outstanding Guest Actor in a Comedy Series for his performance. Azaria originally auditioned for the role of Joey.

==== Nora Tyler Bing ====
Nora Tyler Bing (Morgan Fairchild): Chandler's mother, a best-selling erotic novelist whose works include Euphoria Unbound, Euphoria At Midnight and Mistress Bitch. She first appears in "The One with Mrs. Bing", where she meets the gang while on a book tour in New York. She divorced Chandler's father after discovering his affair with the family's pool boy, and the news explained Chandler's intense dislike for Thanksgiving. According to the shows creators, Nora was inspired by outspoken female characters from 1980s television dramas, and her strained yet humorous relationship with Chandler is used to explore themes of embarrassment, identity, and parental boundaries. After dinner, she kisses Ross. She makes a cameo appearance in the flashback scenes of "The One with All the Thanksgivings" and later appears in "The One with Monica and Chandler's Wedding" (with Kathleen Turner as Chandler's dad) and "The One After 'I Do'". The Seattle Times ranked Nora and her ex-husband jointly as the fifth best guest characters in 2004.

==== Ugly Naked Guy ====
Ugly Naked Guy (Jon Haugen): A tenant in the apartment in the building across from Monica's apartment who frequently, perhaps invariably, is naked with the drapes open—so the gang is frequently commenting on his activities—playing cello, wearing "gravity boots", etc. He is first mentioned in the second episode of the series, but only appears twice: first, his belly and an arm are shown in "The One with the Giant Poking Device"—in which he is being poked from across the street by the gang (who think he is dead) with a long device made from chopsticks; second, a rear view of him from head to waist is shown in "The One Where Everybody Finds Out" (his final show)—in which he is moving out of his apartment and Ross tries to get the apartment by ingratiating himself with Ugly Naked Guy by cavorting with him in the nude. (In "The One with the Flashback", it is learned that he used to be "Cute Naked Guy", but then, in 1993, started putting on weight).

For many years, the identity of the actor that played him in his extremely limited appearances was a mystery. It was speculated that Mike Hagerty, the actor who played Mr. Treeger, was Ugly Naked Guy. However, Hagerty denied this theory. On May 31, 2016, an article was published by Todd Van Luling in The Huffington Post, detailing his search for the identity of Ugly Naked Guy. His article revealed that an actor named Jon Haugen played the role.

=== Introduced in season 2 ===
==== Estelle Leonard ====
Estelle Leonard (June Gable): Joey's talent agent. She is usually seen wearing colorful clothes, heavy make-up, and a bouffant. She chain smokes and has a strong New York accent. Gable's first appearance as Estelle, in "The One with the Butt", was cut for time, though the character appears off-screen when she signs Joey and lands him his first film role, playing Al Pacino's butt-double. The cut scene is included in the episode's DVD release. Her first on-screen appearance comes in season 2's "The One with Russ", where she gets Joey a recurring part in Days of Our Lives. Although she is shown to be supportive of Joey's career throughout the show, in "The One Where Joey Loses His Health Insurance" it is suggested she has instead been bad-mouthing him after mistakenly assuming he has found another agent. She dies in the final season, and Joey speaks at her memorial service, where it is revealed that by that point she represented only two clients — Joey and a man whose act is eating paper.

When Gable auditioned for the role, she played Estelle quite plainly and was encouraged to "go away and do something with her". She returned to the audition room wearing a "fat suit" and eating a sandwich from a delicatessen, which she stubbed out a cigarette on. The performance was used in the deleted scene of "The One with the Butt". Her age is never given but Gable believed that she was in her 80s. In 2004, The Seattle Times ranked Estelle as the sixth-best guest character of the series. Gable also plays the nurse who delivers Ben in "The One with the Birth".

==== Richard Burke ====
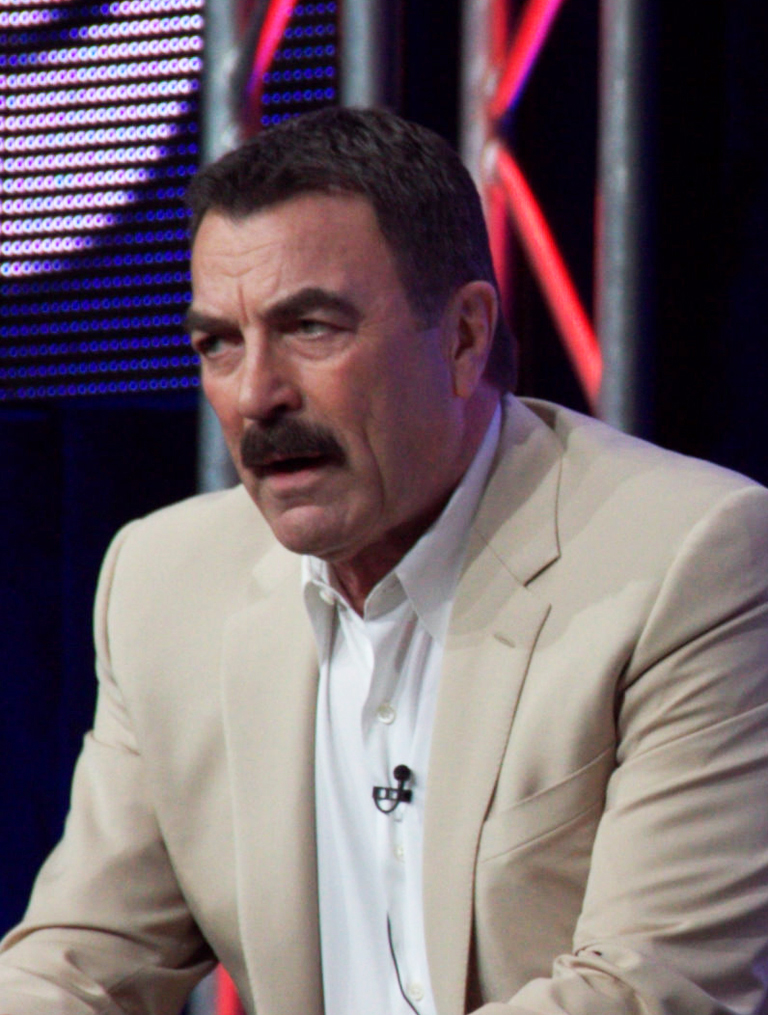
Tom Selleck played Monica's boyfriend Dr. Richard Burke in several episodes between 1995 and 2000.

Dr. Richard Burke (Tom Selleck): an ophthalmologist and close friend of Jack Geller. Richard is introduced when Monica caters an event for him in "The One Where Ross and Rachel … You Know"., and they begin dating despite their 21-year age difference. Ross is initially upset, but becomes supportive of their relationship, especially when Monica decides to tell their parents. This does not go well at first, but even Monica's parents have to admit that they've never seen Richard happier and that he's not just "fooling around" with a younger woman. He and Monica break up in "The One with Barry and Mindy's Wedding" when he tells her he does not want more children, his own having already grown up (and had children of their own). Despite the two still being in love, they cannot reconcile this difference, and are both devastated for months. He makes a brief voice cameo in "The One Where No One's Ready", and later they briefly attempt to rekindle their romance as "friends" before accepting that the reasons they broke up remain valid. In "The One in Vegas", Monica and Richard bump into each other off-screen and have lunch together. Monica does not feel anything for Richard but refrains from telling Chandler because of their upcoming anniversary. When he learns the truth, they fight for most of the episode until Monica assures Chandler that she will never see Richard again. In "The One with the Proposal", he runs into Monica and Chandler at dinner. While Chandler is planning to propose but pretends to be against marriage because he "wants it to be a surprise", Richard stuns Monica by telling her that he still loves her, and wants to marry her and have kids with her. Monica rejects him but later arrives at his apartment, frustrated with her own situation. She complains to him for a bit about how bad things are going in her love life before leaving to think things over. Eventually, Chandler comes to his apartment searching for Monica and tells Richard of his own proposal plan. Richard seems to lack sympathy for Chandler at first, responding to Chandler explaining away his plan to make her initially think he was against marriage by stating it had "worked very well" but when Chandler angrily tells him he has no right to ruin another man's relationship with her because he's already ruined his own, he realizes Chandler is right and tells him, "You go get her, Chandler. And can I give you a bit of advice? If you get her, don't let her go. Trust me" — noting that he hates the fact that he is a nice guy when Chandler thanks him. His apartment is put up for sale in season 9, in "The One with Ross's Inappropriate Song", but Richard is not seen. While there, Chandler finds out that Richard made a sex tape with Monica which he steals and watches, but he and Monica later discover that Richard taped over her, relieving Chandler but leaving Monica feeling insulted.

All of Selleck's entrances in season 2 had to be refilmed after the audience left because "it was like The Beatles with the screaming and the applause". Selleck was nominated for the Primetime Emmy Award for Outstanding Guest Actor in a Comedy Series in 2000 for his appearance in "The One with the Proposal". In 2004, The Seattle Times ranked Richard as the third-best guest character of the series.

==== Sandra Green ====
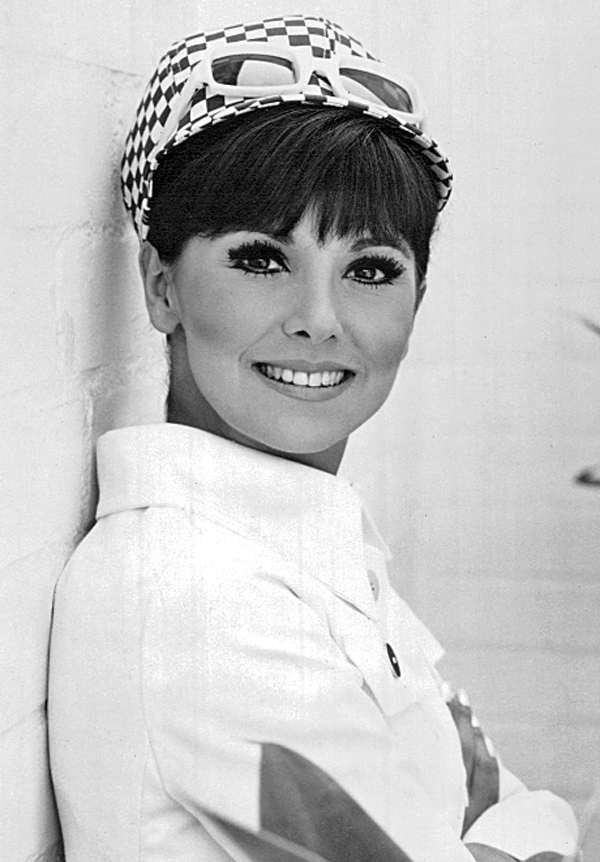
Marlo Thomas played Sandra Green, Rachel, Jill and Amy's mother, who divorced Rachel's father in season 2, and appears in various episodes from then on.

Sandra Green (Marlo Thomas): Rachel's overprotective mother. In "The One with the Lesbian Wedding", she announces to Rachel that she never loved Rachel's father and is divorcing him. ("You didn't marry your Barry, honey—but I married mine.") She later accompanies everyone to Carol and Susan's wedding. In "The One with the Two Parties", she arrives at Rachel's birthday party and is unaware for the whole night that her ex-husband is also there, as the six friends successfully prevent them from finding out each other are there by setting up two different parties, bemusing them both with their strange, wacky behavior in the process; Joey even ends up kissing Sandra to distract her from her ex-husband's departure. In "The One with the Baby Shower", she is invited at the last minute to attend Rachel's baby shower, where she offers to move in with Ross and Rachel to help with the baby's first months; Rachel first accepts, then Ross makes her change her mind. When Rachel was planning to move to Paris, Sandra would fly out with Emma a few days later. However this never happens as Rachel chooses to remain in New York with Ross.

For her appearance in "The One with the Lesbian Wedding", Thomas was nominated for the Primetime Emmy Award for Outstanding Guest Actress in a Comedy Series in 1996.

==== Frank Buffay Jr. ====
Frank Buffay Jr. (Giovanni Ribisi): Phoebe and Ursula's half-brother by their father. In "The One with the Bullies", Phoebe meets him after finding the courage to knock on her father's suburban door, but learns from Frank Jr.'s mother (played by Laraine Newman) that her father walked out several years ago. Despite not finding her father, she connects with Frank Jr. who later visits the city where he hits on Jasmine, one of Phoebe's coworkers, and mistakes her massage parlor for a whorehouse. He eventually falls in love with and becomes engaged to Alice Knight (Debra Jo Rupp), his former home-economics teacher who is 26 years his senior. In "The One with Phoebe's Uterus", Frank and Alice ask Phoebe to be a surrogate mother for their child, and she later gives birth to their triplets, whom she then says goodbye to in an emotional scene in "The One Hundredth". Frank makes a final appearance in "The One Where Ross is Fine", when he and the triplets meet Phoebe at Central Perk. In the episode, he claims he "hasn't slept in four years" and is so exhausted with raising the triplets he even proposed that Phoebe take one for her own. However, he soon realizes he loves his children too much to give any of them up; Phoebe proposes to start babysitting them so that Frank and Alice can enjoy some more time off.

Previously, Ribisi appeared in "The One with the Baby on the Bus" as a stranger who leaves a condom rather than money in Phoebe's guitar case when she is singing on the street, then comes back to retrieve it. It was never addressed if this was intended to be the same character as Frank, who had not yet been introduced by name.

In 2004, The Seattle Times ranked Frank as the fourth-best guest character of the series. Alice was only scheduled to appear in the one episode but was brought back for a recurring role after the surrogacy storyline—which was created when actor Lisa Kudrow became pregnant.

=== Introduced in season 4 ===
==== Emily Waltham ====
Emily Waltham (Helen Baxendale): The English niece of Rachel's boss Mr. Waltham, who arrives for a two-week visit to New York in "The One with Joey's Dirty Day". She has a whirlwind romance with Ross and they decide to get married. Her friendly relationship with Rachel soon changes during the wedding. The friends fly to London for their wedding in "The One with Ross's Wedding" (airdate May 7, 1998; Season 4, No. 23 & 24), and Ross accidentally says Rachel's name at the altar, humiliating Emily in front of her friends and family. She aims to reconcile with him at the airport in "The One After Ross Says Rachel" (airdate September 24, 1998; Season 5, No. 1) but sees Rachel with him about to go on their honeymoon and storms out again. Ross tries to convince her to move to New York. She agrees but makes him promise to get rid of everything Rachel has ever come into physical contact with in the friends' apartments (which would be virtually impossible) and she demands that he never see Rachel again. When she learns that he's having dinner with the old gang—including Rachel—she tells him she cannot trust him and she decides to end the marriage. She makes a final voice cameo in "The One with the Ride Along", when she leaves a message on Ross's answering machine the night before her new wedding, telling him she is having second thoughts about it and is worried that they made a mistake splitting up. Rachel accidentally deletes the message, but tells Ross about it and convinces him not to respond to it. In a later episode Ross reveals Emily is getting married again. Emily's surname is that of the city where both creators of the show attended college.

Patsy Kensit was originally approached to play the role but she was removed from the role after early rehearsals. Emily and Ross's marriage was intended to last much longer in the series, but Helen Baxendale became pregnant prior to season 5 and was unable to travel for the show; hence, her limited appearances after season 4. Helen Baxendale was asked to reprise the role in season 10, but turned it down to star in the West End play After Miss Julie, and because she did not want the same level of tabloid attention she received in 1998.

=== Introduced in season 7 ===
==== Tag Jones ====
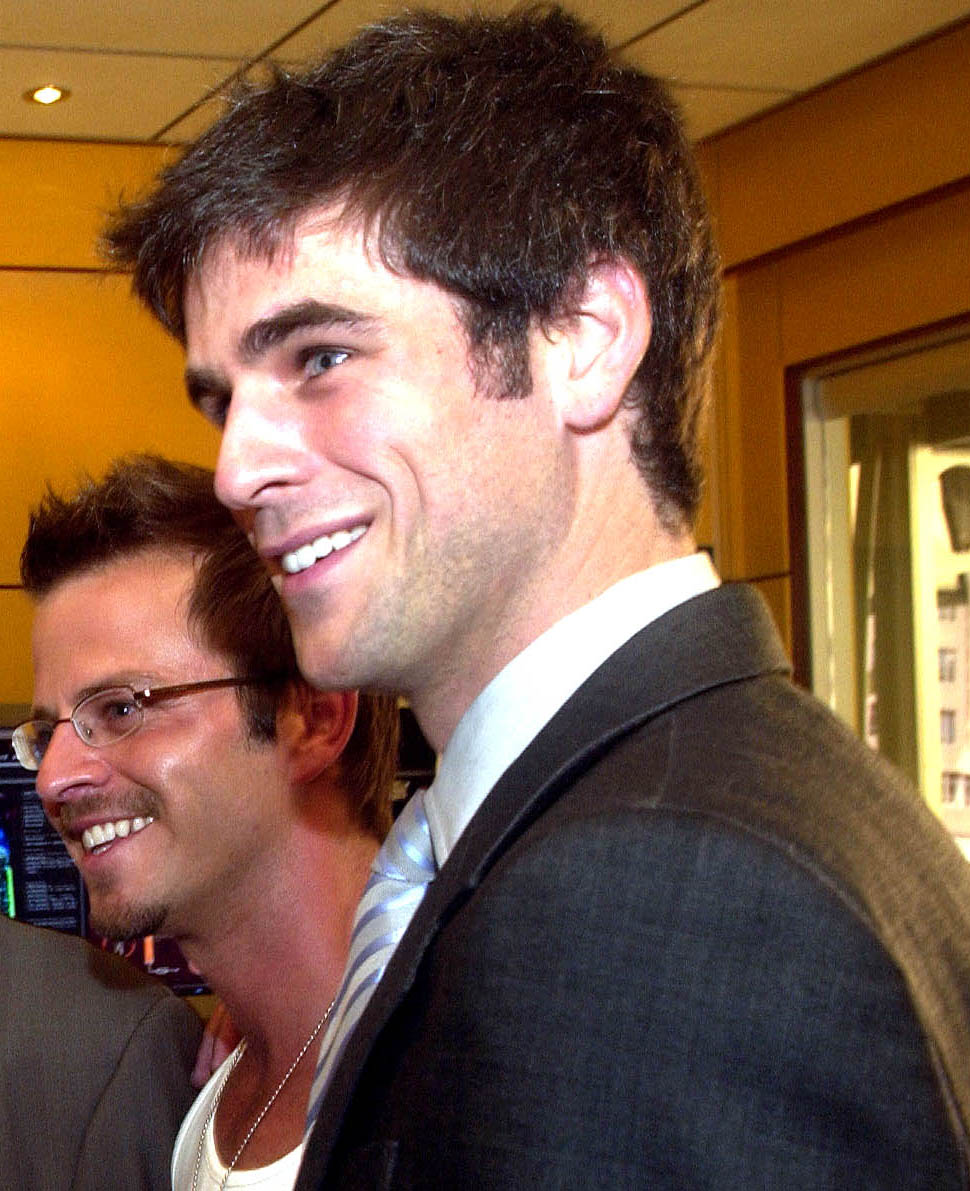
Eddie Cahill recurred as Tag Jones in six episodes of season 7 and one episode of season 8.

Tag Jones (Eddie Cahill): Rachel's inexperienced but attractive new assistant at Polo Ralph Lauren. She hires him after being promoted, not because he is the best choice for the job but because she is smitten with him. After he also becomes interested in her they try to keep their relationship a secret from her boss Zelner; otherwise Tag's employment would be a conflict of interest. In "The One Where They All Turn Thirty" Rachel breaks up with Tag when she realizes that their six-year age difference makes him too young and immature for her to be dating if she intends to follow her marriage schedule. He reappears in "The One with the Red Sweater" in season eight when Phoebe thinks he is the father of Rachel's unborn baby. He tells Rachel that he has matured a lot since their break-up and wants to resume their relationship, but backs off when he finds out she is pregnant by someone else. He later meets up with Ross—who is the real father and is wearing the same kind of red sweater.

==== Charles Bing/Helena Handbasket ====
Charles Bing/Helena Handbasket (Kathleen Turner): Chandler's father and Nora's ex-husband, regularly referred to as an unseen character in previous seasons. The character's gender identity is ambiguous within the series, but a later interview confirmed Charles was intended as a transgender woman. Determined to invite them to their wedding in "The One with Chandler's Dad", Monica drags Chandler to Helena's burlesque show in Las Vegas, where they are seen for the first time, performing under the name "Helena Handbasket". Chandler invites them to the wedding, and they and Nora walk Chandler down the aisle in "The One with Monica and Chandler's Wedding, Part 1". They do not appear at the reception in "The One After 'I Do'", though a deleted scene reveals they are upstairs crying after Joey accidentally ruined their dress.

=== Introduced in season 9 ===
==== Mike Hannigan ====
Mike Hannigan (Paul Rudd): a former lawyer who, after his divorce, decides to change his lifestyle and pursue his dreams of being a pianist. In "The One with the Pediatrician", Joey and Phoebe agreed to set each other up on a blind double date, but Joey forgets and shouts out the name Mike in Central Perk, to which Mike responds and agrees to go on the date. Despite Joey's lies being exposed, Phoebe and Mike end up connecting and dating. Phoebe meets his parents in "The One with Ross' Inappropriate Song" and discovers they are very wealthy; they disapprove of Phoebe, but Mike declares his love for her. They move in together during "The One with the Boob Job" but break up after Mike admits he does not want to get married again. However, after Monica discovers that David wants to propose to Phoebe, she convinces Mike to fly out to Barbados in "The One in Barbados" as she knows they still love each other. Mike and David both propose to Phoebe, and she chooses Mike but rejects the proposal, stating they are not ready and she just wants to assurance that they will be married one day.

Mike and Phoebe officially get back together and move in again. In "The One where Rachel's Sister Babysits", he attempts to propose on the big screen during a game, but panics after Phoebe mentions she hates when people propose this way; Phoebe attempts to fix this by proposing on the screen herself, but it again fails. The pair later get engaged at a restaurant and get married during "The One with Phoebe's Wedding", where a freak snowstorm leaves the venue in chaos and prevents guests from arriving, forcing them to be married by Joey in the street. Mike and Phoebe remain happily married for the rest of the series, with it being implied they will try for children in the show's final episode.

==== Charlie Wheeler ====
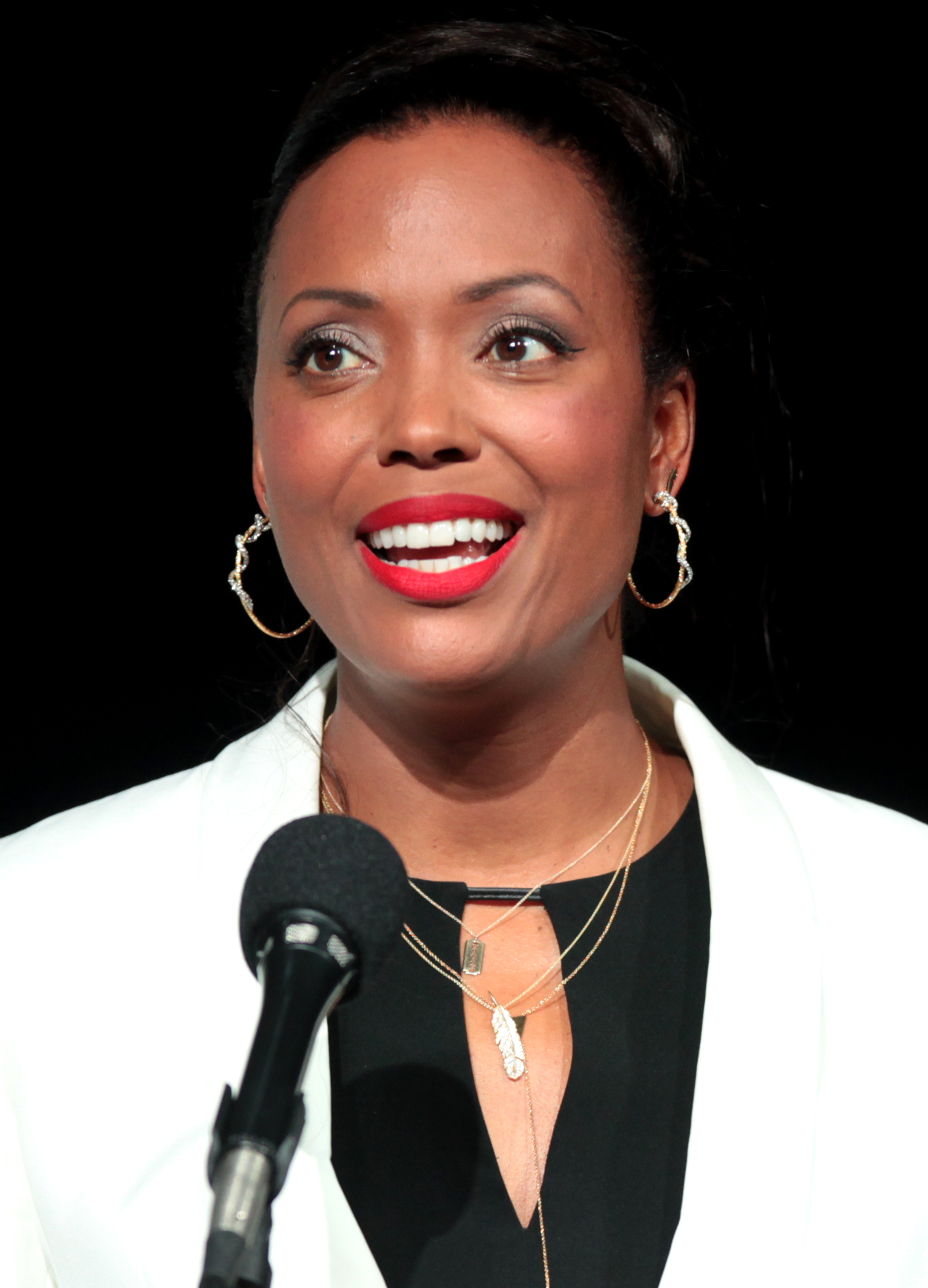
Comedian Aisha Tyler played Joey's, then Ross', paleontologist girlfriend in seasons 9 and 10.

Charlie Wheeler (Aisha Tyler): an attractive paleontology professor (goes to Woodroffe school) whom Ross falls for in "The One with the Soap Opera Party" (airdate April 24, 2003; season 9, No. 20). He plans to ask her out, but is too late when she gets together with Joey instead. Initially angry, he eventually accepts Joey and Charlie's relationship and helps Joey come up with intelligent places to take her on dates in "The One with the Fertility Test". At Ross's conference in "The One in Barbados", Charlie tells Joey that they have nothing in common and breaks up with him. She and Ross then get together. In "The One with Ross's Grant" (airdate November 6, 2003; season 10, No. 6), she breaks up with Ross and gets back together with her old flame, Dr. Benjamin Hobart (Greg Kinnear).

The character of Charlie was created in part to counter criticism the Friends production staff had received for featuring too few characters played by ethnic minority actors. Aisha Tyler was only the second major supporting character to be portrayed by a black actress, following Gabrielle Union's appearance as Kristen Lang in "The One with the Cheap Wedding Dress" (airdate March 15, 2001; season 7, No. 17). The role was not specifically written for a black actor. Tyler told the St Petersburg Times, "I hope [people's] frustration over [the lack of diversity] is tempered by the fact that when they wrote this role, they didn't wimp out. They wrote her so smart and sexy and elevated, she wasn't just the black girl on Friends."

== Characters appearing in only one season ==
Each of the following characters of Friends, portrayed by a celebrity, may or may not be particularly significant to the story

=== Only in season 2 ===
==== Russ ====
Russ (David Schwimmer; credited as "Snaro") is the first man Rachel dates after Ross. A slightly-taller doppelgänger of Ross, Russ is a dentist. While both Ross and Rachel are initially oblivious to Russ' resemblance to Ross, Rachel finally notices after the duo get into an argument over what defines a "doctor". In the final scene of the episode, "The One with Russ", Russ reveals to Phoebe and Chandler that Rachel had broken up with him. As Russ wonders what he will do with his life, Ross' own ex-girlfriend Julie enters and meets eyes with Russ, the two instantly falling in love, and leaving Central Perk together. In 2019, Lauren Tom described the couple as still being together by that year.

=== Only in season 3 ===
==== Pete Becker ====
Pete Becker (Jon Favreau): a computer software genius and multi-millionaire, Pete is introduced when he tips Monica $20,000 at the Moondance diner in "The One with the Hypnosis Tape", which she assumes is a joke. He asks her out for a pizza, and takes her to Rome. Monica worries about the fact that she is not attracted to him and cannot figure out why. When Pete offers her a job in his restaurant, she turns him down, not wanting to hurt his feelings, but a goodbye kiss from Pete finally awakens her feelings. Monica thinks he is going to propose in "The One with Ross's Thing"; instead, he tells her he wants to become an Ultimate Fighting Champion. He gets badly beaten by Tank Abbott, and every other fighter he encounters, and Monica reluctantly ends their relationship after he refuses to quit despite his increasingly debilitating injuries.

The character of Pete was conceived as "a Bill Gates billionaire genius scientist-type" to whom Monica was not attracted. The producers and casting director had difficulty finding an actor to play Pete as they wanted, "someone who was appealing enough that we liked him, so we could root for him, but on the other hand, wasn't so drop-dead male model gorgeous that we would go, 'What's your problem?' to Monica when she didn't fall for him."

=== Only in season 4 ===
==== Joshua Burgin ====
Joshua Burgin (Tate Donovan): a recently divorced customer and millionaire business investor who regularly uses Rachel as a personal shopper at Bloomingdale's. Joshua first appears in "The One with Rachel's Crush" (airdate January 29, 1998; season 4, No. 13). They start dating, but break up in "The One with All the Wedding Dresses" (airdate April 16, 1998; season 4, No. 20) when Rachel, reeling from Ross' recent engagement to Emily, proposes to Joshua after just four dates. Joshua Burgin's parents, referred to as Mr. and Mrs. Burgin, are played by John Bennett Perry (Matthew Perry's real life father) and Pat Crowley. Joshua appeared after the time that Jennifer Aniston and Tate Donovan were dating each other in real life.

=== Only in season 6 ===
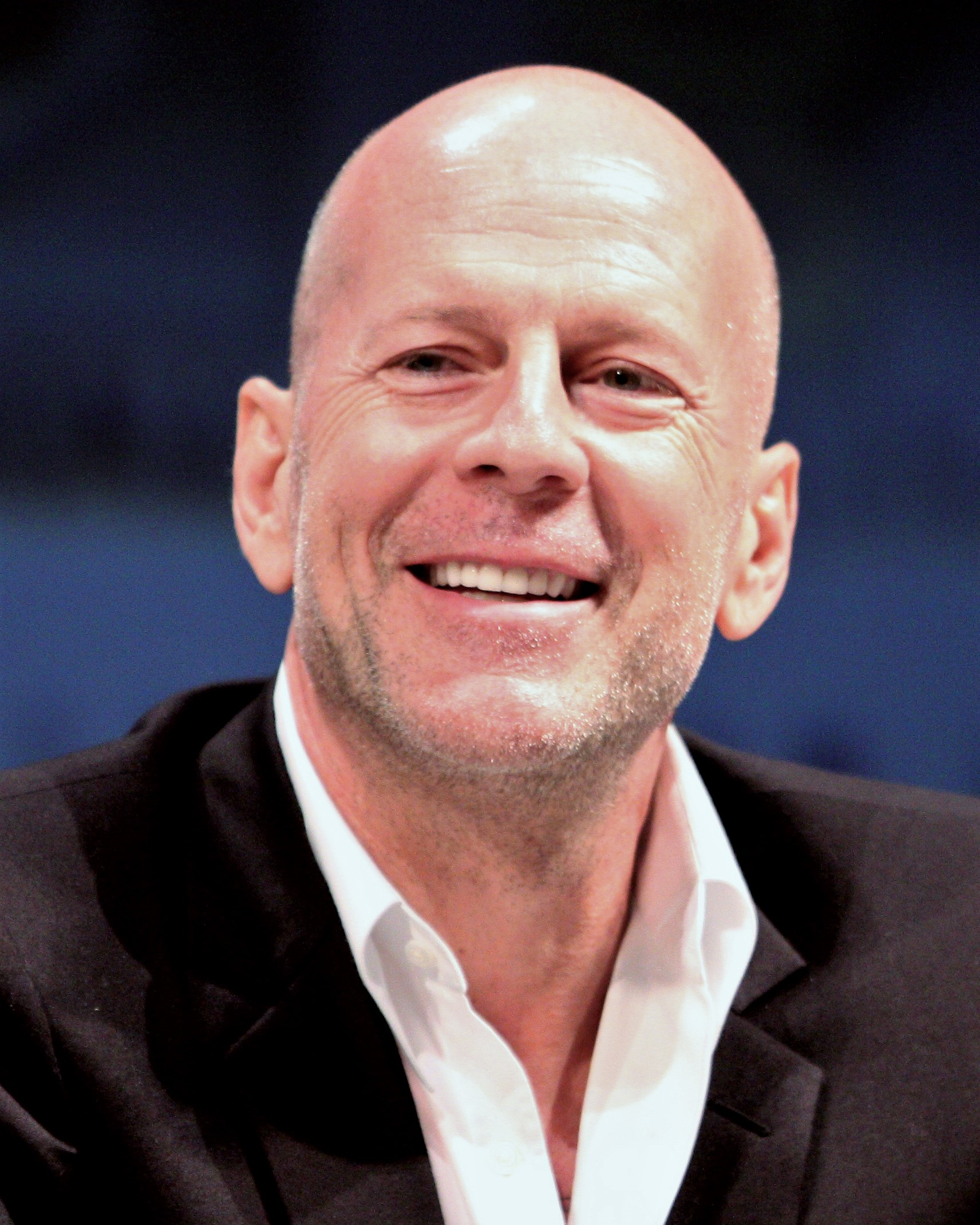
Bruce Willis appeared in three episodes of season 6 and donated his fee to five charities.

==== Paul Stevens ====
Paul Stevens (Bruce Willis), Elizabeth's father, who takes an instant dislike to Ross; he threatens to have Ross fired from the university unless he ends his relationship with Elizabeth. After Rachel joins the three of them for dinner, Paul and Rachel start dating. The two couples end up at Paul's country cabin in "The One Where Paul's the Man", unbeknownst to each other. Ross hears Paul psyching himself up in the mirror and singing "Love Machine", and uses this knowledge to blackmail Paul into not revealing his relationship with Elizabeth to the university. After Ross and Elizabeth break up, Rachel continues to date Paul, but feels that he is too closed-off and attempts to get him to open up emotionally; she regrets this when he does open up, breaking down in tears and talking about his past for hours, and she breaks up with him.

Bruce Willis donated his appearance fee to five charities after losing a bet with his The Whole Nine Yards co-star Matthew Perry. He won the Primetime Emmy Award for Outstanding Guest Actor in a Comedy Series for his role.

=== Only in season 8 ===
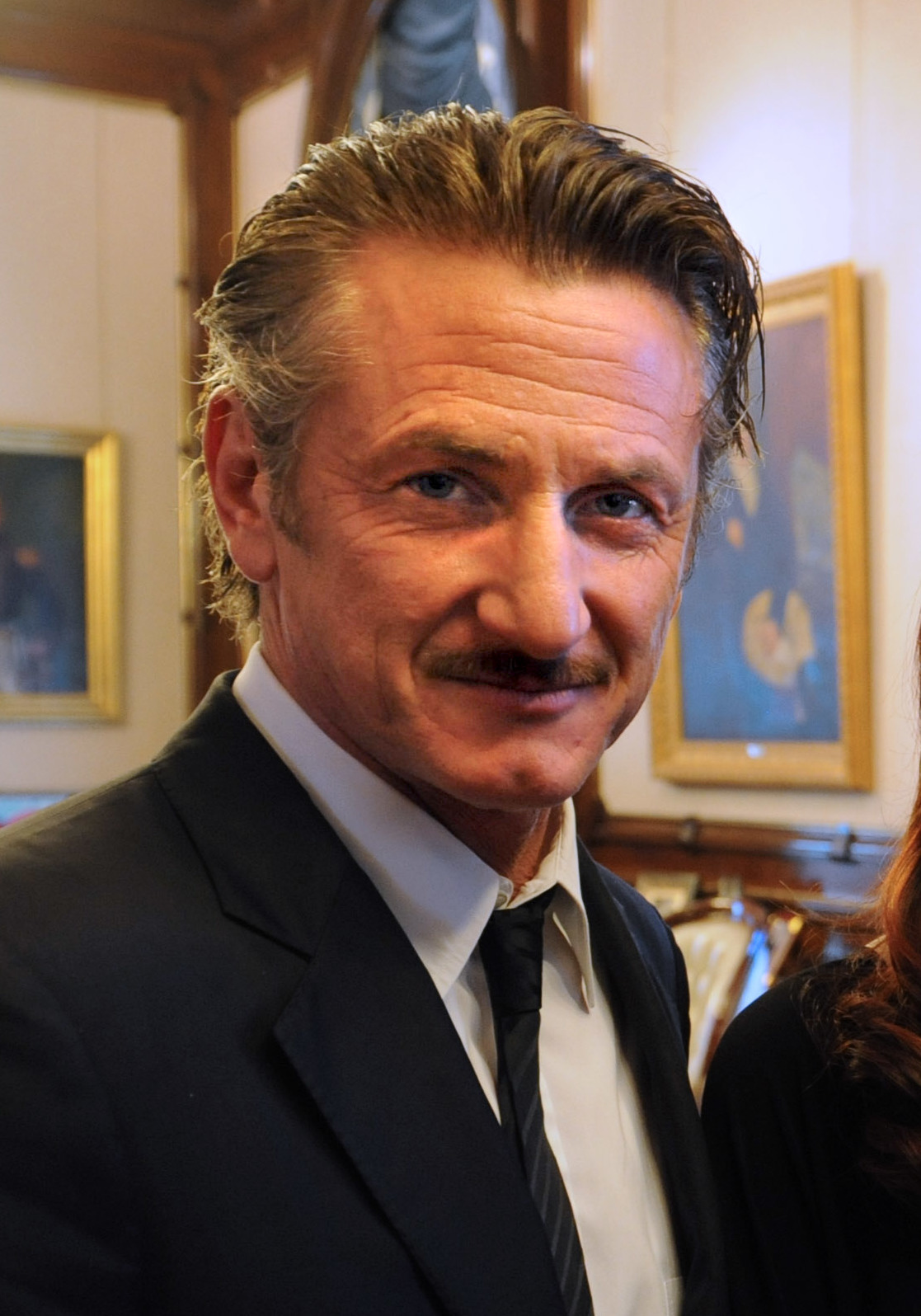
Sean Penn portrayed Eric, Phoebe's date and former date of her twin sister Ursula, in two episodes.

==== Eric ====
Eric (Sean Penn): Ursula Buffay's boyfriend, whom she brings to Monica's Halloween party in "The One with the Halloween Party" (airdate November 1, 2001; season 8, No. 6). Phoebe is attracted to him but learns that Ursula has lied about herself in order to marry him, and so promptly warns him about Ursula's lies. He dumps her and in "The One with the Stain" he tries to get together with Phoebe, but cannot stand to look at her as she reminds him of her sister. Phoebe is able to convince him to see past that, and after she leaves for a massage client after their make-out session, she comes back only to find that Eric had sex with Ursula thinking she was Phoebe. They awkwardly decide that it is too weird to pursue things any further. Penn got the role after he made several visits to the Friends set with his children, who were fans of the show.
