= The One Where No One's Ready =

- Friends episode
- Episode no.: Season 3 Episode 2
- Directed by: Gail Mancuso
- Written by: Ira Ungerleider
- Production code: 465252
- Original air date: September 26, 1996

Guest appearances
- Tom Selleck as Richard Burke (voice only); Peter Dennis as Sherman Whitfield

Episode chronology
← Previous "The One with the Princess Leia Fantasy"	Next → "The One with the Jam"

"The One Where No One's Ready" is the second episode of the third season of the American television sitcom Friends and 50th overall, which aired on NBC on September 26, 1996. The plot centers on Ross's (David Schwimmer) anxiety as his friends take too long getting ready for a function that evening.

The episode was written by Ira Ungerleider and directed by Gail Mancuso. It is a bottle episode, featuring only three speaking roles other than the central cast; occurs in real time; and takes place almost entirely in the living room of Monica's and Rachel's apartment.

== Plot ==
Chandler tricks Joey into drinking chicken fat from a glass in Monica's fridge; he admits after Joey drinks it that he fell for the same thing and drank the chicken fat earlier. Ross arrives to gather everyone together for an important function at his museum. Even though only 22 minutes remain for them to don their formal attire, no one else is ready, apart from Phoebe who arrives fully dressed and ready to go.

When Monica returns, she checks her answering-machine messages and hears a message from her ex-boyfriend Richard. She is unable to determine whether the message was left before or after they broke up. After Chandler comes back from the bathroom, he is dismayed to find that Joey took his chair while he was up. They argue over the chair until Joey accidentally flings hummus onto Phoebe's dress. She tries to ask Monica what removes hummus stains, but Monica is too distracted with her own problems. Rachel then tries to find something else for Phoebe to wear, but is unsuccessful.

In a fit of insecurity, Monica breaks into Richard's voicemail, and hears a message left by another woman, leading her to believe that Richard has already begun seeing someone else. Chandler suggests the woman might be Richard's daughter Michelle, and Monica confirms this by prank-calling her. Michelle calls her back, and Monica admits her indiscretions. She is unable to secure Michelle's silence on the matter, so Chandler and Phoebe are left yanking her off the second phone in her bedroom.

Ross orders Chandler to get dressed. When he does, Joey surrenders the chair but takes its cushions with him. Phoebe eventually finds a Christmas ribbon meant to garnish a present in Rachel's room and wears that on her dress to cover the stain. Rachel is the only one almost ready to go, but she cannot decide on what to wear; this tries Ross's patience. Eventually he snaps and yells at her in front of everyone, demanding that she pick out any outfit at all so that they can go. In response, Rachel emerges in sweatpants, having lost interest in attending the function.

Unbeknownst to Joey, Chandler has already taken his revenge by hiding all of Joey's underwear, forcing him to go commando in a rented tuxedo. Joey promises to do the "opposite" of Chandler hiding his underwear, and emerges wearing everything Chandler owns (still without underwear). Ross, who has had enough of their bickering, finally steps in and bans them from the function. When he then apologetically asks Rachel what he can do to make amends, Joey suggests Ross should drink the glass of chicken fat, which Rachel accepts. Ross agrees to do so, but Rachel, touched by the gesture, stops him and quickly dresses.

While Ross sorts out Joey's and Chandler's argument, Monica remotely accesses Richard's answering machine, intending to delete her previous messages and record a new one. However, she accidentally sets her new message as his outgoing message, humiliating herself. With five seconds to spare, the friends leave the apartment, with Rachel and Ross in the rear. As they leave, Rachel informs Ross that she is also going commando.

Over the credits, Professor Sherman Whitfield joins Ross's table to congratulate him. Chandler returns and declares that Whitfield is in his seat; when Whitfield refuses to move, Chandler demands his underwear.

== Production ==
Executive producer Kevin S. Bright conceived a bottle episode format for the series as a way of saving money for other episodes by using a single set and no guest stars. The success of this episode led to the format being used at least once per season thereafter, with episodes including "The One with Monica's Thunder" and "The One on the Last Night" being based solely around the core cast of six. Bright believes these episodes were some of the best of the series. This is also the only episode of Friends to take place in "real time".

Matt LeBlanc dislocated his shoulder during one take of the stunt where Joey and Chandler race towards the chair, landing upside down as a result, with the audience assuming it was part of the act. The injury was not edited into the episode, but for the following two episodes, LeBlanc's injury was written into the show as Joey dislocating his shoulder while jumping on his bed. Production on the episode was temporarily halted, and completed once LeBlanc recovered.

== Reception ==
Entertainment Weekly notes that the episode "owes a large stylistic debt to Seinfeld", specifically citing the 1991 episode "The Chinese Restaurant" (which likewise plays out in real time). It rates the episode C and calls the answering machine gag "derivative of George Costanza". The authors of Friends Like Us: The Unofficial Guide to Friends call it "forgettable"; "The script is dull and the performers seem to know it, with none of them trying particularly hard to make it work". AllMovie says it "stands out for the way it realistically portrays how group inertia can slow you down".

Popular reaction is more positive; the episode appeared on one of the first region 1 "best of" DVD releases and it was voted the third most popular episode in an NBC poll in 2004. Joey's use of the phrase "going commando," which originated in the U.S. on college campuses in the early 1970s, became a popular catchphrase, especially with sports-related media.

== Parody ==
Part of this episode was recreated, line for line, in the video for "Moonlight", a song from 4:44 by Jay-Z, featuring an all-black cast. The recreation is detailed - the setting, the shots and the costumes are the same - but the theme song is "Friends" by Whodini instead of "I'll Be There for You" by The Rembrandts. Jerrod Carmichael is Ross, Issa Rae is Rachel, Tiffany Haddish is Phoebe, Lakeith Stanfield is Chandler, Lil Rel Howery is Joey, and Tessa Thompson is Monica.
