= Friends season 3 =

Season of television series

Friends
- Season 3
- Friends season 3 DVD cover
- Showrunners: David Crane; Marta Kauffman
- Starring: Jennifer Aniston; Courteney Cox; Lisa Kudrow; Matt LeBlanc; Matthew Perry; David Schwimmer
- No. of episodes: 25

Release
- Original network: NBC
- Original release: September 19, 1996 – May 15, 1997

Season chronology
- ← Previous; Season 2 Next → Season 4

The third season of the American television sitcom Friends aired on NBC from September 19, 1996, to May 15, 1997.

== Cast and characters ==
=== Main cast ===
- Jennifer Aniston as Rachel Green
- Courteney Cox as Monica Geller
- Lisa Kudrow as Phoebe Buffay
- Matt LeBlanc as Joey Tribbiani
- Matthew Perry as Chandler Bing
- David Schwimmer as Ross Geller

=== Recurring cast ===
- Maggie Wheeler as Janice Litman
- Jon Favreau as Pete Becker
- Steven Eckholdt as Mark Robinson
- Angela Featherstone as Chloe
- Giovanni Ribisi as Frank Buffay, Jr.
- Dina Meyer as Kate Miller
- James Michael Tyler as Gunther
- Teri Garr as Phoebe Abbott
- Jennifer Milmore as Lauren

=== Guest stars ===
- Tom Selleck as Richard Burke
- June Gable as Estelle Leonard
- David Arquette as Malcolm
- Christine Taylor as Bonnie
- Larry Hankin as Mr. Heckles
- Isabella Rossellini as herself
- E.G. Daily as Leslie
- Sherilyn Fenn as Ginger
- Robin Williams as Tomas
- Billy Crystal as Tim
- Ben Stiller as Tommy
- Matt Battaglia as Vince
- Richard Gant as Dr. Rhodes
- Robert Gant as Jason
- Suzanna Voltaire as Margha
- Sam McMurray as Doug
- Kevin McDonald as Guru Saj
- Debra Jo Rupp as Alice
- James Hong as Hochi
- Steve Park as Phil

== Episodes ==
No. overall	No. in season	Title	Directed by	Written by	Original release date	Prod. code	U.S. viewers (millions)	Rating/share (18–49)
49	1	"The One with the Princess Leia Fantasy"	Gail Mancuso	Michael Curtis & Gregory S. Malins	September 19, 1996	465251	26.76	13.8/42
Ross reveals a sexual fantasy to Rachel, which involves Princess Leia's gold bikini from Return of the Jedi. Monica suffers from insomnia after breaking up with Richard. Chandler, back together with Janice, wants Joey to bond with her, a seemingly impossible request. To remedy the situation, Janice insists she and Joey spend a fun day together so they can finally bond. Joey later admits to Chandler that he still cannot stand Janice, but says that they both survived the day without incident, which is enough to satisfy Chandler.
50	2	"The One Where No One's Ready"	Gail Mancuso	Ira Ungerleider	September 26, 1996	465252	26.73	13.3/39
Ross is in a hurry to get everyone ready in time for an important banquet at the museum but they keep delaying. Monica freaks out after hearing a voicemail from Richard, unsure if it is an old message or a new one. Joey and Chandler fight over who can sit in Monica's chair. Phoebe arrives on time but gets in the way of Joey and Chandler throwing hummus, which lands on her dress. Joey takes the chair cushions, then puts on all of Chandler's clothes. Rachel refuses to go after Ross yells at her for not being dressed.
51	3	"The One with the Jam"	Kevin S. Bright	Wil Calhoun	October 3, 1996	465253	25.23	12.9/40
Phoebe is stalked by a man named Malcolm who mistakes her for her identical twin, Ursula. Phoebe then tries to help Malcolm to get over Ursula. Ross and Rachel give Chandler "boyfriend" lessons, one of which ultimately backfires on Ross. Monica copes with her break-up with Richard by making jam, and then considers having a baby by artificial insemination through a sperm bank. Joey's arm is in a sling after hurting his shoulder jumping on the bed. (Matt LeBlanc dislocated his shoulder in the previous episode, which was written into the plot). Guest star: David Arquette (who would later go on to marry Monica's actress, Courteney Cox)
52	4	"The One with the Metaphorical Tunnel"	Steve Zuckerman	Alexa Junge	October 10, 1996	465254	26.10	13.6/40
Phoebe pretends to be Joey's agent and has some success in getting him auditions, but the initial rush soon wears off when she is forced to tell him why he is always being turned down. Ben brings a Barbie doll that he has personally picked for himself on his weekend visit with Ross. This bothers Ross, who then tries to get him to give up Barbie in favor of G.I. Joe. Chandler is advancing in his relationship with Janice and, realizing his fear of commitments, seeks the girls' advice.
53	5	"The One with Frank Jr."	Steve Zuckerman	Shana Goldberg-Meehan & Scott Silveri	October 17, 1996	465255	23.25	12.1/34
Phoebe's half-brother, Frank Jr., comes to town but his quirky behavior makes bonding difficult. This is made even more awkward when Frank Jr. initially misunderstands that Phoebe works as a hooker, and sexually hits on her masseuse friend during a massage session. Joey builds an entertainment unit that is too big for the apartment and annoys Chandler. When Joey bets five bucks that he can fit inside the entertainment unit, Chandler purposely loses the bet in order to lock him in as payback. Ross is challenged to make a list of five celebrities that he would most likely sleep with. When Isabella Rossellini comes into the coffee shop, Ross tries flirting with her by claiming she was on his list at first, but bumped her off (for Winona Ryder) upon hearing Chandler's explanation that she is "international". Guest star: Isabella Rossellini.
54	6	"The One with the Flashback"	Peter Bonerz	David Crane & Marta Kauffman	October 31, 1996	465256	23.27	12.0/36
When Janice playfully asks the gang if any two of them (other than current couple Ross and Rachel, as well as siblings Ross and Monica) have ever slept together, the gang flashes back to 1993 (one year before the pilot episode), the time when the coffee shop was a bar. The gang's secrets are revealed: Ross and Phoebe nearly had sex on a pool table when the former was depressed after finding out his then-wife, Carol, is a lesbian; Joey mistook Monica's lemonade offer as an advancement and hit on her by getting naked; Chandler tried to hit on Rachel at the bar when he overheard her lamenting to her girlfriends that she might not have anymore casual flings after getting married with Barry. She brushed Chandler off initially, though fantasized about having sex with him while driving later on.
55	7	"The One with the Race Car Bed"	Gail Mancuso	Seth Kurland	November 7, 1996	465257	27.36	13.7/38
Rachel tries to get her father and Ross to bond during a dinner out together, only for Ross to criticize her father for under-tipping. Hoping for one last chance for the men to get along, Rachel sets up a brunch the morning after, only for it to backfire on her when she realizes that criticizing her is the only common interest that both men have. Joey teaches a soap opera acting class. When he finds out that one of his students are up against him for the same role (a boxer) in a soap opera, Joey tries sabotaging the student's chances by suggesting that the latter should audition with the idea that the boxer is gay. The gang lambaste Joey for betraying the student's trust, though it ultimately backfires on Joey when the student wins the part instead of him. Monica tries returning a bed after receiving the wrong one from Janice's ex-husband's store. While trying to help Monica return the bed to the store, Joey catches Janice kissing her ex.
56	8	"The One with the Giant Poking Device"	Gail Mancuso	Adam Chase	November 14, 1996	465258	28.69	14.3/38
When Chandler wants to buy Janice an expensive gift for her birthday, Joey reveals that he saw her kissing her ex-husband. Upon confronting her about the kiss and heeding Joey's advice, Chandler reluctantly breaks up with her, not wanting her to destroy her family. While babysitting Ben, Monica accidentally bumps his head on a post. Both Monica and Rachel try to hide the bump from Ross, though Ross manages to guilt trip his sister and ultimately bumps his head afterwards, also on a post and seemingly on the same spot as his son. Phoebe has a bad toothache but fears going to the dentist because it always leads to somebody that she knows dying. She finally visits the dentist after Rachel urges her to, and upon returning, is relieved to find out that everybody she knows is still alive, thereby "breaking the curse". However, her happiness is short-lived when the gang notices shortly afterwards that Ugly Naked Guy has been lying motionless in his apartment in the adjacent building for the entire day. The gang then fashions a long and giant poking device using only chopsticks to determine if he is alive and is relieved when he swats it away.
57	9	"The One with the Football"	Kevin S. Bright	Ira Ungerleider	November 21, 1996	465259	29.28	15.2/41
Emotions become the feast of the day when the gang plays touch football on Thanksgiving, unleashing Ross's and Monica's competitive streaks. Joey and Chandler argue over who gets to date a Dutch model watching the game. Rachel, feeling continually sidelined, makes a play that seems to win the game, but when it falls short, Ross and Monica simultaneously dive for the ball, with neither one refusing to yield it.
58	10	"The One Where Rachel Quits"	Terry Hughes	Gregory S. Malins & Michael Curtis	December 12, 1996	465260	25.10	12.4/36
When Gunther tells Rachel that she has to undergo retraining despite having worked at the coffee shop for two and a half years, she becomes fed up and ultimately quits upon heeding Chandler's and Joey's advice on taking the fear from being unemployed in order to pursue her passion in fashion. Both men then lend out a helping hand in her job search - Chandler helps her in preparing her resumés, while Joey gets her a job lead at Fortunata Fashions with the help of his father. She eventually gets hired at Fortunata Fashions, but her happiness is short-lived when she finds out the job still requires her to do waitressing. Phoebe helps Joey with selling Christmas trees, but becomes disconcerted after learning that the old and unused trees get thrown into a chipper. Monica and Joey then decide to buy all those trees in order to appease Phoebe. Ross accidentally breaks a little girl's leg, and then attempts to make it up to her by helping her sell Brown Bird cookies to people (including Monica who gets addicted to "Mint Treasures" cookies all over again) in order to help her win a trip to space camp. When he does not win the trip in the end, he decides to give the girl an unprecedented private Space Camp experience with the help of Chandler and Joey.
59	11	"The One Where Chandler Can't Remember Which Sister"	Terry Hughes	Alexa Junge	January 9, 1997	465261	29.80	15.3/37
Monica and Rachel's noisy upstairs neighbor is excessively charming. Phoebe confronts him about the noise and ends up dating him, making Monica and Rachel uncomfortable when they later hear all of Phoebe's intimate upstairs activities. Rachel is frustrated with her new job of making coffee all day and sorting hangers. When Rachel vents her frustration to Monica at the diner, a customer named Mark mentions a vacancy in his department at Bloomingdale's and arranges an interview. Rachel gets the job, but Ross suspects Mark has ulterior motives for recommending her. A drunken Chandler fools around with one of Joey's sisters, but later cannot remember which one, angering Joey.
60	12	"The One with All the Jealousy"	Robby Benson	Doty Abrams	January 16, 1997	465262	29.61	15.0/38
Convinced Mark wants to steal Rachel, a jealous Ross showers her with romantic gifts at the workplace. Rachel assures Ross he can trust her with Mark, then becomes jealous when he and Ben have a play date with the stripper from a bachelor party he attended who has a son Ben's age. Joey's numerous lies on his padded résumé catch up with him when he is forced to teach a dance to an entire Broadway cast, unsuccessfully. Monica dates Julio, a busboy from the diner who writes her a poem called "The Empty Vase". Touched, Monica sleeps with him, but Phoebe explains that the poem means he thinks she is "empty" inside. When Julio reveals that the poem is about all American women, Monica later gets revenge.
61	13	"The One Where Monica and Richard Are Just Friends"	Robby Benson	Michael Borkow	January 30, 1997	465265	28.03	14.3/38
Monica's willpower is tested after running into Richard at the video store. The two decide to just be "friends", but soon are more than that. Joey agrees to read Little Women while Rachel reads The Shining. Phoebe's athletic new boyfriend accidentally keeps exposing himself through his loose-fitting shorts.
62	14	"The One with Phoebe's Ex-Partner"	Robby Benson	Wil Calhoun	February 6, 1997	465266	28.91	15.2/40
Phoebe is reunited with her former singing partner Leslie (E.G. Daily), but is offended when Leslie thinks "Smelly Cat" has potential as cat food ad jingle. Chandler dates a woman with a prosthetic leg (Sherilyn Fenn), only to learn she once dated Joey, who accidentally threw her artificial limb into a fireplace. Ross, fed up with Rachel's long work hours, is ecstatic when Mark leaves Bloomingdale's for another job, only to discover he and Rachel are attending a fashion seminar together. To prevent Rachel going with Mark, Ross accompanies her instead, but he quickly falls asleep, causing a fresh argument leaving their relationship on rocky ground.
63	15	"The One Where Ross and Rachel Take a Break"	James Burrows	Michael Borkow	February 13, 1997	465263	27.25	13.9/38
Chandler and Joey are both attracted to Chloe (Angela Featherstone), the girl who works at the copy center. Phoebe dates an East European diplomat whose interpreter accompanies them everywhere to translate. To gain some privacy, Phoebe fixes up Monica with the interpreter. She soon regrets it after the interpreter wants to spend all his time talking to Monica. Ross and Rachel's relationship is further strained when she has to work late on their one-year anniversary. Ross surprises her with a basket lunch, but she insists she is too busy. They later have a bitter fight with Rachel saying they need a break. Upset, Ross goes drinking with Joey and Chandler and ends up sleeping with Chloe.
64	16	"The One with the Morning After"	James Burrows	David Crane & Marta Kauffman	February 20, 1997	465264	28.26	14.5/40
Rachel calls Ross the next morning saying she wants to get back together. Ross rushes Chloe out of his apartment before Rachel arrives, then frantically runs around trying to cover up the trail leading to his and Chloe's tryst. Rachel discovers the truth from Gunther, and she and Ross have a huge fight as the other four friends listen in from Monica's bedroom. Ross is desperate for forgiveness, but Rachel refuses and ends the relationship, leaving both devastated.
65	17	"The One Without the Ski Trip"	Sam Simon	Shana Goldberg-Meehan & Scott Silveri	March 6, 1997	465267	25.84	12.9/37
The aftermath of Ross and Rachel's breakup leaves the group in a state of stress, as the other friends are trying to keep them all intact without alienating the former couple. Rachel understandably does not invite Ross on a weekend ski trip with the rest of the group, but less rationally refuses to contact him even after Phoebe’s cab breaks down and they have no other way to get out of the snowy back-country road they are stuck on. Phoebe contacts Ross covertly to come help them, which he reluctantly agrees to, and Rachel is angry that he was called and insults him when he shows up, leading to Ross in turn getting angry at her and declaring that Monica and Joey agreed with his "we were on a break!" defense. Things get so bad that Chandler nearly has a breakdown, but Phoebe bluntly tells Ross and Rachel that enough is enough and they have only two options: be polite to each other and function in the group, or be this way and see the friends break apart for good. They agree to be civil, and Rachel invites Ross to join them on the trip, leading Ross in turn to politely decline and wish them a good time.
66	18	"The One with the Hypnosis Tape"	Robby Benson	Seth Kurland	March 13, 1997	465269	28.07	13.4/37
One of Monica's customers, Pete Becker (Jon Favreau), who wants to date Monica, leaves her a $20,000 tip that she considers to be a joke, but he turns out to be a billionaire. Monica reluctantly agrees to a date with Pete, who takes her out for pizza--in Italy. Phoebe is shocked when her 18-year-old brother becomes engaged to his former teacher, Alice (Debra Jo Rupp), a woman more than twice his age. Phoebe convinces Alice to come to her apartment and tell Frank why the relationship cannot work, only for this to backfire when the couple become passionate upon seeing each other. Chandler uses a hypnosis audio tape while sleeping to quit smoking, but it is meant for women, which brings out his feminine side.
67	19	"The One with the Tiny T-Shirt"	Terry Hughes	Adam Chase	March 27, 1997	465268	23.65	11.9/38
Rachel has a date with Mark, her first since splitting with Ross, but soon finds she is unready for a new relationship. This leaves Ross devastated, and he plans to break them apart but Chandler convinces him to accept the fact that Rachel has "moved on". Joey develops a crush on Kate (Dina Meyer), his costar in his new play. Monica continues dating Pete, even though she is still not attracted to him.
68	20	"The One with the Dollhouse"	Terry Hughes	Wil Calhoun	April 10, 1997	465270	24.36	12.6/39
Rachel regrets arranging a date for Chandler and her boss, Joanna. Joey's interest in Kate intensifies after they sleep together, but her relationship with the play's director complicates matters. Monica's aunt dies, leaving her a beautiful antique dollhouse. Monica invites Phoebe, who never had a dollhouse, to help her set it up, but gets upset with Phoebe's creative embellishments. Phoebe gets angry and brings over her homemade dollhouse, which meets a sad end.
69	21	"The One with a Chick and a Duck"	Michael Lembeck	Chris Brown	April 17, 1997	465271	23.22	11.5/36
Pete offers Monica the head chef job at a new restaurant he just bought, but she suspects he is using it to woo her. When he insists he is over her and has met someone else, Phoebe correctly surmises he is lying. While Pete and Monica inspect the restaurant, Monica realizes Pete's true motive, then surprisingly discovers she has genuine feelings for him. Joey and Chandler adopt a chick and a duck. When Rachel struggles to get ready for a work event due to a broken rib, Ross tries to assist her, then ultimately skips being on a panel for the Discovery Channel to take her to a hospital when he realizes she is in too much pain to attend the event. This leaves her touched by what he gave up to help her, and she is left feeling positive about him for the first time in a long time.
70	22	"The One with the Screamer"	Peter Bonerz	Shana Goldberg-Meehan & Scott Silveri	April 24, 1997	465272	22.63	11.9/37
Rachel dates Tommy (Ben Stiller), an aggressive bully who terrorizes anyone crossing him. When only Ross observes his bad behavior, everyone else claims he is just jealous over Rachel, but Tommy eventually cannot hide his true self and the group finally sees Tommy's true character when he screams at the chick and the duck. Joey and Kate part when she gets an acting job in Los Angeles. Using Monica's phone, Phoebe is on hold for days waiting to speak to a company before her warranty expires, unaware it is not a toll-free "800" number.
71	23	"The One with Ross' Thing"	Shelley Jensen	Ted Cohen & Andrew Reich	May 1, 1997	465274	24.17	12.9/39
Afflicted with a mysterious skin condition on his back, Ross seeks advice from Phoebe's herbalist (Kevin McDonald). Unable to choose between dating a hunky fireman or a smart kindergarten teacher, Phoebe attempts to date both, though neither is entirely what she believes them to be. Monica thinks Pete wants to break up after he says they "need to talk" when he returns from Atlanta. Monica thinks Pete is going to propose when she finds a receipt from a ring designer. To her initial relief and then shock, Pete had a professional athletic ring built to pursue his dream of being an Ultimate Fighting champion.
72	24	"The One with the Ultimate Fighting Champion"	Robby Benson	Story by : Pang-Ni Landrum & Mark Kunerth; Teleplay by : Shana Goldberg-Meehan & Scott Silveri	May 8, 1997	465273	23.07	12.2/38
Monica tries to support Pete's UFC dreams, but after his brutal losses, she says she cannot stay if he continues, then breaks up with him after he refuses to quit. Chandler has a problem when his new boss keeps slapping his butt in a friendly but inappropriate manner but at the end he lets his new boss slap his butt after feeling left out. Phoebe sets Ross up on a date with Bonnie (Christine Taylor), a pretty girl who used to shave her head. Rachel is not happy to see that Bonnie is now a very hot blonde, nor that Ross likes her a lot. This episode's cold open features a joint cameo appearance from Billy Crystal and Robin Williams.
73	25	"The One at the Beach"	Pamela Fryman	Story by : Pang-Ni Landrum & Mark Kunerth; Teleplay by : Adam Chase	May 15, 1997	465275	23.39	N/A
Chandler tries proving to Monica that he is "boyfriend material". The gang goes to Montauk for the weekend, but their borrowed beach house is filled with sand after a storm. Phoebe meets the woman, also named Phoebe, who knew her parents. She suspects the elder Phoebe knows more than she is telling, so she breaks into her house looking for information about her father. Elder Phoebe catches her, then confesses that she is Phoebe's birth mother. The gang plays strip Happy Days game, with Joey losing more than his shirt. Rachel and Ross flirt until Bonnie unexpectedly shows up and has loud sex with Ross, making Rachel even more jealous to the point where she convinces Bonnie to shave her head bald again. Ross discovers that Rachel still loves him and may want to reconcile; meaning he must choose between her and Bonnie.

== Home media ==
The third season was officially released on DVD in region 1 on April 1, 2003, by Warner Home Video, as a 4-disc DVD Box Set. The release includes the extended versions of every episode with footage not seen on their original NBC broadcast. Special Features include 3 audio commentaries with executive producers Kevin S. Bright, Marta Kaufmann and David Crane, a video guide to season three's guest stars, an interactive map of Joey and Chandler's apartment with inside stories from the crew, a trivia quiz and video character bios. For region 2, the release included the original NBC broadcast version of the episodes, and not the extended versions unlike the region 1 release.

Unlike the previous two seasons, Warner Home Video didn't release Season 3 on Blu-ray individually, although it was released altogether with the rest of the series on the Complete Series Blu-ray releases; in this releases, season 3 episodes are presented in their original NBC broadcast versions and does not include the extra deleted scenes and jokes that were included in the DVD version. Additional audio and subtitle tracks are also included with this releases.

Friends: The Complete Third Season
Set Details		Special Features
25 episodes; 4-disc set (DVD); 2-discs (Blu-ray); English (Dolby 5.0 Surround) (DVD); English (Dolby Digital 5.1) (Blu-ray); English, French & Spanish subtitles; Audio Commentaries; 587 minutes (DVD); 569 minutes (Blu-ray)		Over 20 minutes of Never-Before-Seen footage included on every episode (DVD Only); Producers Commentary on 3 episodes: "The One Where No One's Ready", "The One with the Football" and "The One with the Morning After"; Tour of Joey and Chandler's Bachelor Pad: Interactive Map (DVD Only) (Note: Not available on the 2019 re-release of the DVDs); Friends of Friends: Video Guestbook; Trivia Quiz: "Ross and Rachel: On a Break?" (DVD Only); What's Up with Your Friends: Video Character Bios
Release Dates
Region 1	Region 2	Region 4
April 1, 2003	May 29, 2000	October 4, 2006

== Reception ==
Collider ranked the season Number 3 on their ranking of all ten Friends seasons, and named "The One with the Morning After" as its standout episode.
