= List of Episodes episodes =

British-American television sitcom parts

Episodes is a sitcom created and written by David Crane and Jeffrey Klarik, which premiered on Showtime on January 9, 2011, and on BBC Two on January 10, 2011. The show follows Sean and Beverly Lincoln, a British writing couple who travel to Hollywood to remake their successful show, Lyman's Boys, as an American series. During the course of the series, 41 episodes of Episodes aired over five seasons, between January 9, 2011, and October 8, 2017.

== Series overview ==
Season	Episodes	Originally released	
Season	Episodes	First released	Last released
1	7	January 9, 2011	February 20, 2011
2	9	May 11, 2012	July 6, 2012
3	9	January 12, 2014	March 16, 2014
4	9	January 11, 2015	March 15, 2015
5	7	August 20, 2017	October 8, 2017

== Episodes ==
=== Season 1 (2011) ===
No. overall	No. in series	Title	Directed by	Written by	UK viewers (millions)	US viewers (millions)	Original release date
1	1	"Episode One"	James Griffiths	David Crane & Jeffrey Klarik	1.86	0.768	January 9, 2011 (US); January 10, 2011 (UK)
After winning another BAFTA for their hit sitcom, Lyman's Boys, Sean and Beverly Lincoln are approached by American television executive Merc Lapidus who woos them into re-creating their sitcom for an American audience. After initial hesitation, they decide to accept his offer and make the journey from London to Los Angeles. On their first day in pre-production Sean and Beverly are told that Julian Bullard (played by Richard Griffiths), who stars in the British television programme Lyman's Boys, will need to re-audition for the American adaptation. They also learn that Merc has lied to them and has never even seen an episode of their show. Bullard is not given the job and Matt LeBlanc is given the role instead.
2	2	"Episode Two"	James Griffiths	David Crane & Jeffrey Klarik	1.53	0.442	January 16, 2011 (US); January 17, 2011 (UK)
Merc invites Sean and Beverly to an elegant dinner party at his house. At the party, Matt flatters Sean and flirts with Beverly. Matt convinces Merc to change his character from an aged headmaster to a hockey coach, and the name of the show to "Pucks!"
3	3	"Episode Three"	James Griffiths	David Crane & Jeffrey Klarik	1.16	0.332	January 23, 2011 (US); January 24, 2011 (UK)
The first reading of Pucks! is disrupted by Merc's crass etiquette. Sean and Matt travel to Las Vegas while Beverly is left at home, bitterly disappointed with the changes that Matt has suggested to the show. Matt convinces Sean about the changes. Sean develops a man-crush on Matt in the face of his charm, wealth, and celebrity. Beverly is also surprised to learn that Morning Randolph, who plays their central female part, is apparently much older than she looks.
4	4	"Episode Four"	James Griffiths	David Crane & Jeffrey Klarik	1.09	0.558	January 30, 2011 (US); January 31, 2011 (UK)
Filming for the Pucks! pilot begins. Matt hits the drink after he loses his court case over custody of his children. With a photographer waiting to capture Matt driving after drinking alcohol, Sean and Beverly go to pick him up. Beverly and Matt appear to make amends. The morning after, however, Matt's attitude towards Beverly returns.
5	5	"Episode Five"	James Griffiths	David Crane & Jeffrey Klarik	1.33	0.379	February 6, 2011 (US); February 7, 2011 (UK)
Matt invites Sean to a 'Rape Prevention Task Force' gala, where more of Morning's secrets are revealed. Beverly and Carol get stoned and bond over stories of their love lives. Beverly becomes paranoid that Sean is falling for Morning. Sean finds Morning's sex tape on the internet, and watches it while masturbating, unaware that Beverly is watching him.
6	6	"Episode Six"	James Griffiths	David Crane & Jeffrey Klarik	1.12	0.489	February 13, 2011 (US); February 14, 2011 (UK)
Beverly decides to leave Los Angeles for good, but is involved with a head-on collision with Matt's car after she confronts Sean about his relationship with Morning. Sean has lunch with Merc in an attempt to salvage the Pucks! pilot when Carol reveals that he has become bored with the show. Beverly and Matt have sex when he takes her back to his house following the crash, after finally getting their differences out into the open.
7	7	"Episode Seven"	James Griffiths	David Crane & Jeffrey Klarik	1.06	0.589	February 20, 2011 (US); February 21, 2011 (UK)
With the pilot episode of Pucks! wrapped up, Sean and Beverly plan on returning to the UK. Merc thinks the pilot is terrible and states that it will not result in a full season. Sean visits Matt and discovers the truth about what happened between him and Beverly, leading to a fist fight between Sean and Matt. All three end up back at Sean and Beverly's house and while arguing about the whole situation they receive an unexpected call from Merc to say that the pilot was a hit with the test audience and that they have a hit show to write.

=== Season 2 (2012) ===
No. overall	No. in series	Title	Directed by	Written by	UK viewers (millions)	US viewers (millions)	Original release date
8	1	"Episode One"	Jim Field Smith	David Crane & Jeffrey Klarik	1.24	0.486	July 1, 2012 (US); May 11, 2012 (UK)
Sean and Beverly's marriage is in tatters and they are living apart, after Beverly's fling with Matt just before their new U.S. sitcom Pucks! opens to appalling reviews yet unexpectedly high ratings. Matt's attempts to be friendly with Sean again are rebuffed. After Sean's birthday celebration, Morning kisses him several times and indicates she wants to develop a closer relationship.
9	2	"Episode Two"	Jim Field Smith	David Crane & Jeffrey Klarik	1.03	0.373	July 8, 2012 (US); May 18, 2012 (UK)
Sean and Morning have slept together the night before the second week's dreadful viewing figures are released, with Pucks! being bested by the talking dog show. Merc's wife Jamie has sex with Matt in his dressing room. Merc and his creative team try to brainstorm a replacement project for Pucks!. After a concerted effort Matt finally schmoozes his way back to being friends with Sean and Beverly with gifts of two cars.
10	3	"Episode Three"	Jim Field Smith	David Crane & Jeffrey Klarik	1.03	0.417	July 15, 2012 (US); May 25, 2012 (UK)
Matt and Jamie's affair continues. Merc's father dies leaving Sean, Beverly, and Matt struggling to decide what condolence gift they should buy to stay in Merc' good books. Morning accidentally reveals to Beverly that she has been in Sean's bedroom. Merc interrupts his father's funeral service to talk business on a cell phone. Beverly cries about the loss of their marriage while standing at the grave-side.
11	4	"Episode Four"	Jim Field Smith	David Crane & Jeffrey Klarik	0.77	0.381	July 22, 2012 (US); June 1, 2012 (UK)
Pucks! numbers continue to tumble. Beverly is surprised Sean now has a Facebook page. He mentions to Matt that someone named "Labia" has added him and Matt warns him that Labia is his stalker and advises him to unfriend her. Beverly and Sean are pressured by the network to shift the show's focus more towards the students, which leads to Matt having a temper tantrum. After a difficult dinner meeting with Merc, Matt gets drunk and threatens to both leave the show and tell Merc about his affair with Jamie; Beverly pleads with him not to and Matt eventually agrees.
12	5	"Episode Five"	Jim Field Smith	David Crane & Jeffrey Klarik	0.97	0.239	July 29, 2012 (US); June 8, 2012 (UK)
Labia, Matt's persistent stalker, violates a restraining order by showing up at a restaurant where Matt and Sean are dining. Sean's social media status inadvertently tips her off. Matt reveals Labia has been stalking him for 15 years since he took her to Disneyland as a child. Carol urges Merc to celebrate their 5th 'anniversary' with a weekend getaway. Jamie tries to plan a trip with Matt, leading to potential exposure of their affairs. Morning's botched plastic surgery causes filming issues.
13	6	"Episode Six"	Jim Field Smith	David Crane & Jeffrey Klarik	0.87	0.332	August 5, 2012 (US); June 15, 2012 (UK)
Matt discovers stalker Labia topless in the kitchen of his rental home and throws her out. Merc asks Matt to get a Friends co-star to appear in Pucks!. Four of the five other main cast members all angrily decline due to past grudges they hold against him. The only one he manages to get is Gunther (James Michael Tyler) after nobody would give him Jennifer Aniston's latest cell number. Techies fix Morning's face with bluescreen tape and $40,000 worth of CGI and Beverly is introduced to Morning's younger (though he appears far older than her) brother, Rob, whom she flirts with slightly. Matt asks Sean and Beverly to write a speech for him, but they struggle with the task late into the night, get drunk and start making love on a desk; it ends badly, with Sean finding it too hard to forgive her for her fling with Matt, walking out and leaving a bereft Beverly.
14	7	"Episode Seven"	Jim Field Smith	David Crane & Jeffrey Klarik	0.68	0.343	August 12, 2012 (US); June 22, 2012 (UK)
Merc and Carol ask Sean and Beverly to persuade Matt to address his recent weight gain. Diane is enraged when Labia shows up at their sons' school. Matt is offended by the weight gain suggestion, but later, it's revealed his trouser bulge is just loose candy. Jamie tries to comfort him, but they argue, leading to a tense moment between them. Beverly reluctantly goes on a date with Morning's brother, Rob, while Sean interrupts them with a distraught phone call. Matt drowns his sorrows in cheesecake and drunkenly invites Labia over.
15	8	"Episode Eight"	Jim Field Smith	David Crane & Jeffrey Klarik	0.95	0.412	August 19, 2012 (US); June 29, 2012 (UK)
Labia spends the night with Matt, much to his regret, and they spend the day together at the studio, causing Sean and Beverly's dismay. Merc feels pressure from the network and seeks new program ideas from his struggling team. Sean struggles to cope with Beverly's date. Matt tries to convince Labia to move on, but she refuses. Labia's presence unnerves Diane when she calls Matt. Carol learns she's slated to replace Merc after his award ceremony. Beverly contemplates canceling her date with Rob for Sean, but he encourages her to go. Beverly and Rob share a kiss after their second dinner date.
16	9	"Episode Nine"	Jim Field Smith	David Crane & Jeffrey Klarik	1.04	0.414	August 26, 2012 (US); July 6, 2012 (UK)
Carol, convinced Merc would never leave Jamie, pressures Beverly to disclose Jamie's affair with Matt. Merc, enraged upon learning the truth, confronts Matt at his 'Man of the Year' celebration, resulting in chaos. As the network prepares to dismiss Merc, he becomes violent, shocking everyone, including Carol. Despite her initial attempt to comfort him, Merc's outburst leads Carol to end their relationship. Matt ends up in the hospital, Sean and Beverly reconcile amidst the brawl's aftermath.

=== Season 3 (2014) ===
No. overall	No. in series	Title	Directed by	Written by	UK viewers (millions)	US viewers (millions)	Original release date
17	1	"Episode One"	Iain B. MacDonald	David Crane & Jeffrey Klarik	0.94	0.543	January 12, 2014 (US); May 14, 2014 (UK)
The morning after Merc's "Man of the Year" ceremony, Merc goes to Matt's house to win Jamie back, but does not prevail. At the network, Carol is emotional to begin work replacing Merc, but when she gets excited about it, learns that Merc is actually going to be replaced by Castor Sotto. Meanwhile, Matt gets a DUI with his sons in the car, and Sean and Beverly are back together but Beverly is worried to tell him that she slept with Rob that Wednesday.
18	2	"Episode Two"	Iain B. MacDonald	David Crane & Jeffrey Klarik	0.84	0.443	January 19, 2014 (US); May 21, 2014 (UK)
Beverly wants to start off her relationship with Sean with a clean slate, but Sean cannot get over the fact that she slept with Rob. Carol finally meets Castor Sotto, the man who is stated to replace Merc, and tries to get on his good side. Matt deals with the aftermath of his DUI by learning about Diane's new boyfriend.
19	3	"Episode Three"	Iain B. MacDonald	David Crane & Jeffrey Klarik	0.79	0.400	January 26, 2014 (US); May 28, 2014 (UK)
Matt tries to get off of Pucks! when he is offered a part on a brilliant show on NBC. The only issue is that the writer is Sean and Beverly's nemesis Andrew. Meanwhile, Carol is able to talk Castor out of cancelling Pucks! and gets him to move the show to a new timeslot, promising higher ratings.
20	4	"Episode Four"	Iain B. MacDonald	David Crane & Jeffrey Klarik	0.79	0.429	February 2, 2014 (US); June 4, 2014 (UK)
Matt is scheduled to appear on The Tonight Show with Jay Leno where he is offended to be the second guest. Meanwhile, when Merc comes into the office to pitch some show ideas he is offended by Castor's absence.
21	5	"Episode Five"	Iain B. MacDonald	David Crane & Jeffrey Klarik	0.83	0.475	February 9, 2014 (US); June 11, 2014 (UK)
Sean and Beverly seek help for their marriage, but accidentally find themselves with a sex therapist. Merc steals all of Jamie's paintings and Matt goes to save the day. Meanwhile, the network press event starts and Pucks! is pulled from the schedule.
22	6	"Episode Six"	Iain B. MacDonald	David Crane & Jeffrey Klarik	0.68	0.506	February 16, 2014 (US); June 18, 2014 (UK)
After hearing that Pucks! has been pulled from the schedule, Sean and Beverly begin to prepare to go home, but that can be complicated when Sean lets a fan submit one of their old scripts to FOX. Elsewhere, Matt is angry to find out that they have already cast the NBC pilot, and Morning's sister comes to visit.
23	7	"Episode Seven"	Iain B. MacDonald	David Crane & Jeffrey Klarik	0.70	0.460	February 23, 2014 (US); June 25, 2014 (UK)
Sean is intrigued when Eileen tries to get him to do a pilot she believes has potential, but cannot get Beverly on board, who is already planning on their return to London. Meanwhile, Matt is unhappy to discover that Labia has moved on from him, and Carol thinks it is time to take her relationship with Castor to the next level, but is not aware of his true intentions.
24	8	"Episode Eight"	Iain B. MacDonald	David Crane & Jeffrey Klarik	0.83	0.437	March 9, 2014 (US); July 2, 2014 (UK)
It is the final day of shooting Pucks! and Beverly gives Carol an ultimatum when she reads the script and wants to turn it into a TV show. Meanwhile, NBC wants Matt to audition for the role in Andrew's pilot, especially when they hear a rumor that he is going into rehab that Matt thinks was started by his father.
25	9	"Episode Nine"	Iain B. MacDonald	David Crane & Jeffrey Klarik	0.49	0.482	March 16, 2014 (US); July 9, 2014 (UK)
Sean and Beverly are the subject of a bidding war between Eileen, Carol, and CBS, with Beverly urging Sean to ignore them and go home to London; Matt gets angry when NBC, once again, tells them that he has to audition. But when things start to go their way, the network pulls a wild card that could affect Matt at NBC and the Lincolns in London.

=== Season 4 (2015) ===
On December 11, 2013, Episodes was renewed for a nine-episode fourth series which was filmed in 2014 and began airing on January 11, 2015.

No. overall	No. in series	Title	Directed by	Written by	UK viewers (millions)	US viewers (millions)	Original release date
26	1	"Episode One"	Iain B. MacDonald	David Crane & Jeffrey Klarik	0.95	0.365	January 11, 2015 (US); May 11, 2015 (UK)
Sean and Beverly return to the U.S. to film six additional episodes of Pucks; Matt discovers that the man who he kept his money with has been scamming him for years; Carol is not happy to hear who her new boss is.
27	2	"Episode Two"	Iain B. MacDonald	David Crane & Jeffrey Klarik	0.91	0.366	January 18, 2015 (US); May 18, 2015 (UK)
Matt meets with his advisor to see how dire his financial state is; Sean and Beverly agree to let The Opposite of Us be made and meet with several networks; Carol meets her new boss, Helen.
28	3	"Episode Three"	Iain B. MacDonald	David Crane & Jeffrey Klarik	0.76	0.314	January 25, 2015 (US); May 25, 2015 (UK)
The Opposite of Us could be in jeopardy as Sean's former writing partner returns; Beverly is taken to a Golden Globe gift party; Matt bonds with his ex-wife; Carol and Helen connect.
29	4	"Episode Four"	Iain B. MacDonald	David Crane & Jeffrey Klarik	0.72	0.319	February 1, 2015 (US); June 1, 2015 (UK)
Matt considers remarrying his ex-wife; Sean and Beverly discover that getting Tim to leave the project could be harder than they thought; Carol reveals to Beverly that she had sex with Helen.
30	5	"Episode Five"	Iain B. MacDonald	David Crane & Jeffrey Klarik	0.84	0.343	February 8, 2015 (US); June 8, 2015 (UK)
Sean and Beverly are pinned into a corner by Tim; Matt is offered half a million dollars to attend a brutal dictator's birthday party; Morning tries to convince Matt they had sex before he became famous.
31	6	"Episode Six"	Iain B. MacDonald	David Crane & Jeffrey Klarik	0.92	0.255	February 15, 2015 (US); June 15, 2015 (UK)
Matt's father is admitted to the hospital for heart surgery where Matt must decide whether or not to sell his father's condo, as Sean and Beverly accompany him to the hospital; Carol tries to think of a 'pet name' for Helen.
32	7	"Episode Seven"	Iain B. MacDonald	David Crane & Jeffrey Klarik	0.85	0.301	March 1, 2015 (US); June 22, 2015 (UK)
Sean and Beverly are put in an awkward position when Matt wants the lead role in their new show; Helen thinks that Beverly has a crush on Carol.
33	8	"Episode Eight"	Iain B. MacDonald	David Crane & Jeffrey Klarik	0.77	0.413	March 8, 2015 (US); June 29, 2015 (UK)
Matt begins repossessing every gift he gave Sean and Beverly as his financial situation worsens, and is being forced to take a project with Merc; Carol begins hiding her friendship with Beverly.
34	9	"Episode Nine"	Iain B. MacDonald	David Crane & Jeffrey Klarik	1.10	0.466	March 15, 2015 (US); July 6, 2015 (UK)
Days before filming their new game show, Matt and Merc try their best to put the past behind them; Beverly puts The Opposite of Us at risk as Helen's assumptions escalate; Carol is given an 'insane' job offer.

=== Season 5 (2017) ===
On June 10, 2015, Episodes was renewed for a fifth season to begin filming in 2016 and to begin airing in 2017. Andrew Paul has confirmed that he will be a guest star. On April 11, 2016, it was announced that the fifth season would be the last and contain seven episodes.

No. overall	No. in series	Title	Directed by	Written by	UK viewers (millions)	US viewers (millions)	Original release date
35	1	"Episode One"	Jeffrey Klarik	David Crane & Jeffrey Klarik	N/A	0.239	August 7, 2017 (Online); August 20, 2017 (US)March 30, 2018 (UK)
Matt is presenting a game show called 'The Box', which is a hit. However, Matt is not satisfied with the direction his career is going, whereas Sean and Beverly work to save The Opposite of Us from being ruined by Tim, the new showrunner assigned by Helen. After a day of shooting an episode of 'The Box', Matt forgets that the cameras are always on the contestants from the show even when it is not being shown live, and drunkenly flirts and masturbates outside the container of an attractive female contestant, which Merc intentionally records in the live feed. Meanwhile, Carol reacts badly to having no job and has become a shut-in.
36	2	"Episode Two"	Jeffrey Klarik	David Crane & Jeffrey Klarik	N/A	0.239	August 27, 2017 (US); April 6, 2018 (UK)
Matt has to deal with the consequences of his masturbation in front of a female contestant, in which Merc recorded in the live feed. Merc's sabotage backfires when the ratings for 'The Box' go through the roof, leading the network to keep Matt as the host by catering to his demands. Meanwhile, Sean and Beverly start auditioning actors for The Opposite of Us, which includes a recently paralyzed Anthony Powner Smith cast by Tim, and Carol continues to lament the demise of her career by smoking pot.
37	3	"Episode Three"	Jeffrey Klarik	David Crane & Jeffrey Klarik	N/A	0.264	September 10, 2017 (US); April 13, 2018 (UK)
Matt leverages his reinvigorated celebrity popularity to get a new series guarantee from the network. Convinced that his best chance for success lies with Sean and Beverly, he attempts to woo the reluctant couple away from Tim. Meanwhile, Carol rejects Beverly's idea to sue Helen for blacklisting her and hits rock bottom after accidentally seeing the latter, but later finds solace in Merc.
38	4	"Episode Four"	Jeffrey Klarik	David Crane & Jeffrey Klarik	N/A	0.264	September 17, 2017 (US); April 20, 2018 (UK)
Matt takes Sean and Beverly to his ranch for a working weekend to come up with a new series, where Sean would later accidentally shoot and mortally wound a wild boar. Meanwhile, Carol confesses to Beverly her newfound happiness with Merc, only for Matt, Sean and Beverly to run into Morning, who reveals to them that she is engaged to Merc. At the end of the episode, Carol discovers that she is pregnant with Merc's baby.
39	5	"Episode Five"	Jeffrey Klarik	David Crane & Jeffrey Klarik	1.05	0.350	September 24, 2017 (US); April 27, 2018 (UK)
Matt's father dies suddenly while shopping at a Target store with his partner Linda. He had the car and house keys on him when he died and has been taken away by ambulance. Matt, Sean and Beverly order her an Uber and a locksmith. Matt has to organise the funeral amidst arguing between Linda and Matt's mother via the phone. Matt gives Linda and his mother an urn each, filled with ashes from steaks he cooks. He drives to the ocean to disperse his father's ashes there, but the wind blows them over himself. Meanwhile, Carol and Morning confront Merc over his infidelity.
40	6	"Episode Six"	Jeffrey Klarik	David Crane & Jeffrey Klarik	1.03	0.335	October 1, 2017 (US); May 4, 2018 (UK)
Sean and Beverly become frustrated with Matt when he stakes his claim as a co-producer of their new show, leading Sean to embarrass Matt during his appearance on a shopping channel to promote his vests. Carol advises Beverly to let Matt add his name as a co-producer to make it more appealing to the audience, and Sean wears Matt's last remaining vest as an act of penance, only for Matt to back out of the show. Meanwhile, Carol finally decides to heed Beverly's advice to sue Helen, plans to keep the baby despite breaking things off with Merc (again) and to move back to her home state of Michigan.
41	7	"Episode Seven"	Jeffrey Klarik	David Crane & Jeffrey Klarik	1.00	0.263	October 8, 2017 (US); May 11, 2018 (UK)
Matt explains that he found the script for Sean and Beverly's new show contrived, and they confront him on the set of 'The Box'. Then they develop a completely new show that is based on their own life. Meanwhile, Beverly helps a nervous Carol prepare for her lawsuit against Helen.

== Ratings ==
Episodes : U.S. viewers per episode (thousands)

Season	Episode number									Average
Season	1	2	3	4	5	6	7	8	9	Average
1	768	442	332	558	379	489	589	–		508
2	486	373	417	381	239	332	343	412	414	416
3	543	443	400	429	475	506	460	437	482	464
4	365	366	314	319	343	255	301	413	466	349
5	239	239	264	264	350	335	263	–		279

Audience measurement performed by Nielsen Media Research
