= Family Album (1993 TV series) =

American sitcom television series

- Series premiere print advertisement
- Genre: Sitcom
- Created by: David Crane; Marta Kauffman
- Starring: Peter Scolari; Pamela Reed; Ashlee Levitch; Doris Belack; Christopher Miranda; Phillip Van Dyke
- Composer: Michael Skloff
- Country of origin: United States
- Original language: English
- No. of seasons: 1
- No. of episodes: 8 (2 unaired)

Production
- Executive producers: David Crane; Marta Kauffman; Kevin S. Bright
- Camera setup: Multi-camera
- Running time: 30 minutes
- Production companies: Bright/Kauffman/Crane Productions; Warner Bros. Television

Original release
- Network: CBS
- Release: September 24 – November 12, 1993

Family Album is an American sitcom television series created by David Crane and Marta Kauffman, that aired on CBS from September 24 until November 12, 1993.

== Premise ==
Jonathan and Denise Lerner and their three children move from California to Philadelphia to be closer to their relatives.

== Cast ==
- Peter Scolari as Dr. Jonathan Lerner
- Pamela Reed as Denise Lerner
- Ashlee Levitch as Nikki Lerner
- Doris Belack as Lillian Lerner
- Christopher Miranda as Jeffrey Lerner
- Phillip Van Dyke as Max Lerner
- Alan North as Dr. Sid Lerner
- Rhoda Gemignani as Ruby DeMattis
- Nancy Cassaro as Sheila DeMattis
- Giovanni Ribisi as Elvis DeMattis

== Episodes ==
No.	Title	Directed by	Written by	Original release date	Prod. code	Viewers (millions)
1	"Pilot"	Will Mackenzie	David Crane and Marta Kauffman	September 24, 1993	475072	11.0
Friction in the Lerner family causes sparks.
2	"Sibling Revelry"	Peter Baldwin	David Crane and Marta Kauffman	October 1, 1993	455701	8.7
Sheila is preparing for a class reunion.
3	"Guardian Angel"	Robby Benson	Stephen Engel	October 15, 1993	455704	7.9
Denise finds out that she is not in Ruby's will.
4	"Winter, Spring, Summer or Fall, All You Gotta Do Is Call..."	Robby Benson	Stephen Engel	October 29, 1993	455707	9.5
Jonathan and Denise finds out that another couple doesn't want to see them anymore.
5	"Salon, Farewell, Auf Wiedersehn, Goodbye"	Robby Benson	Jeffrey Klarik	November 5, 1993	455703	6.8
Denise helps her mother give her salon a makeover.
6	"Will You Still Feed Me?"	Robby Benson	Tom Maxwell and Don Woodard	November 12, 1993	455705	8.0
Jonathan's parents are in denial about his mother needing a surgery.
7	"You Always Hit the One You Love"	Peter Baldwin	Ron Burla	Unaired	455702	N/A
8	"Rebel Without a Cousin"	Robby Benson	Jane Harnick and Aaron Harnick	Unaired	455706	N/A
