= John Pankow =

American actor

- Born: April 28, 1954 (age 72); St. Louis, Missouri, U.S.
- Occupation: Actor
- Years active: 1980–present
- Spouse: Kristine Sutherland (m. 1986)
- Children: 1
- Relatives: James Pankow (brother)

John Pankow (born April 28, 1954) is an American actor. He began his career on-stage in New York, in numerous Off-Broadway and Broadway plays including Peter Shaffer's Amadeus, John Patrick Shanley's Italian American Reconciliation, and Brian Friel's Aristocrats. After a starring role in William Friedkin's To Live and Die in L.A. (1985), he began appearing regularly in film and on television, playing Ira Buchman for all eight seasons of Mad About You and later Merc Lapidus on Episodes.

== Early life and education ==
Pankow was born in St. Louis, Missouri, to a Catholic family of German and Irish descent, the sixth of nine siblings. His elder brother is trombonist/composer James Pankow, a founding member of the rock group Chicago. Pankow grew up in Park Ridge, Illinois, and attended Maine South High School and Northeastern Illinois University.

He left the university in his junior year after he attended a performance of David Mamet's American Buffalo at the St. Nicholas Theater. Inspired by the play, he enrolled in the theater's two-year theatrical training program in order to concentrate solely on acting.

== Career ==
While visiting a friend in New York City, Pankow auditioned for, and won, a role in an episode of PBS' Great Performances entitled "Life on the Mississippi". He went on to perform in several Off-Broadway productions including Aristocrats, Italian American Reconciliation, and the New York Shakespeare Festival's The Tempest, Two Gentlemen of Verona and Henry VIII. He subsequently made it to Broadway with Serious Money, The Iceman Cometh, and as Wolfgang Amadeus Mozart in Amadeus, replacing Tim Curry in the role and subsequently replacing him for a touring production.

After minor roles in The Hunger (1983) and Rambo: First Blood Part II (1985), Pankow had his first large role on-screen in To Live and Die in L.A. (1985) as rookie Secret Service agent John Vukovich, starring opposite William Petersen and Willem Dafoe. Pankow - who had previously appeared alongside Dafoe in The Hunger - was cast after director William Friedkin deliberately sought out young, relatively-unknown stage actors for the project. After casting fellow Chicagoan Petersen, the old friend reached out to Pankow, who brought him to Friedkin who cast him on the spot. Pankow landed another major supporting role in The Secret of My Success (1987) opposite Michael J. Fox, and played Demi Moore's husband in Mortal Thoughts (1991). Pankow also appeared in films directed by Matthew Robbins (Batteries Not Included, 1987), George A. Romero (Monkey Shines, 1988), Oliver Stone (Talk Radio, 1988), and John Frankenheimer (Year of the Gun, 1991).

Pankow subsequently appeared for eight seasons as Ira Buchman on the NBC sitcom Mad About You, where he was nominated for four Screen Actors Guild Awards for Outstanding Performance by an Ensemble in a Comedy Series. He was a series regular on the Showtime/BBC series Episodes, playing American television executive Merc Lapidus. He has since appeared in numerous films and television series.

== Personal life ==
Pankow has been married to actress Kristine Sutherland since 1986 and they have one daughter together. He resides in New York City.

== Stage credits ==
Year	Title	Role	Theatre	Notes
1980	Merton of the Movies			
1982-83	Amadeus	Wolfgang Amadeus Mozart	Broadhurst Theatre	Replaced Tim Curry
1981	The Slab Boys	Hector	Hudson Guild Theatre	
1981	Forty-Deuce		Perry Street Theatre	
1981	Hunting Scenes From Lower Bavaria	Abram	Stage 73	
1982	Cloud Nine			
1982	Jazz Poets at the Grotto			
1983	Thornhill			
1984	Henry V			
1985	The Iceman Cometh	Rocky Pioggi	Lunt-Fontanne Theatre	Drama-Logue Award for Outstanding Performance
1987	Two Gentlemen of Verona	Speed	Delacorte Theater	
1987	North Shore Fish			
1988	Serious Money	Zac Zackerman	Bernard B. Jacobs Theatre	
1988	Italian American Reconciliation	Hugh Maximillian Bonfigliano	Manhattan Theatre Club	
1989	Aristocrats	Eamon	Theater Four	Clarence Derwent Award for Most Promising Male Newcomer
1990	Ice Cream with Hot Fudge	Colin/Man in Devon/Shrink/Colleague/Fellow Guest/Hitcher/Professor		
1992	Scheherazade			
1995	The Tempest	Stephano	Delacorte Theater	
1997	Baby Anger	Larry Paterson	Playwrights Horizons Wilder Theater	
2001-02	Barbra's Wedding	Jerry Schiff	Plays and Players Theatre	
2001	Measure for Measure	Lucio	Delacorte Theater	
2003	Barbra's Wedding	Jerry Schiff	Westside Theatre	
2004	Good Canary		Susan Stein Shiva Theater	Workshop
2004-05	Twelve Angry Men	Juror No. 7	American Airlines Theatre	
2006	The Prime of Miss Jean Brodie	Gordon Lowther	Acorn Theatre	
2007-08	Cymbeline	Pisanio	Vivian Beaumont Theater	
2009	Why Torture is Wrong, and the People Who Love Them	Reverend Mike	The Public Theater	
2009	Keep Your Pantheon	Pelargon	Linda Gross Theater	
2010	Equivocation	William Shagspeare	New York City Center	
2012	The Taming of the Shrew	Grumio	New 42nd Street	
2012	Medieval Play		Pershing Square Signature Center	
2013	Natural Affection	Vince Brinkman	Samuel Beckett Theatre	
2014	Much Ado About Nothing	Dogberry	Delacorte Theater	
2015-16	Dada Woof Papa Hot	Michael	Vivian Beaumont Theater	
2017	Assisted Living		Eugene O'Neill Theater Center	Staged reading
2018	Turning Off The Morning News	Jimmy	McCarter Theatre	
2018	The True	Charlie Ryan	Pershing Square Signature Center	
2019	Kiss Me, Kate	Gangster	Studio 54	

== Filmography ==
=== Film ===
Year	Title	Role	Notes
1981	The Chosen	Bully	
1983	The Hunger	1st Phone Booth Youth	
1985	Rambo: First Blood Part II	POW #6	Uncredited
1985	To Live and Die in L.A.	Secret Service Agent John Vukovich	
1987	The Secret of My Success	Fred Melrose	
1987	*batteries not included	Kovacs	
1988	Johnny Be Good	Lou Landers	Uncredited
1988	Monkey Shines	Geoffrey Fisher	
1988	Talk Radio	Deitz	
1991	Mortal Thoughts	Arthur Kellogg	
1991	Year of the Gun	Italo Bianchi	
1992	A Stranger Among Us	Levine	
1998	The Object of My Affection	Vince McBride	
2001	Life as a House	Bryan Burke	
2002	Advice and Dissent	Jeffrey Goldman	Short film
2009	Bride Wars	John	
2010	The Extra Man	George	
2010	Morning Glory	Lenny Bergman	
2012	Putzel	Sid	
2020	Before/During/After	Jim Lonergan	Winner: Best Ensemble Cast; San Diego International Film Festival
TBA	Married Young †	Dr. Levovitz	Post-production

=== Television ===
Year	Title	Role	Notes
1980	Great Performances	George Richie	Episode: "Life on the Mississippi"
1982	The Doctors	Danny Martin	Contract role. 1981-1982
1984	Miami Vice	Floyd Higgins	Episode: "Glades"
1985	First Steps	Fred	Television film
1986	Search for Tomorrow	Father O'Hanlan	Episode: "Finale"
1987	Spenser: For Hire	Billy Hanratty	Episode: "The Song of Orpheus"
1987	Leg Work	Chuck Savin	Episode: "Pilot"
1990–1991	The Days and Nights of Molly Dodd	Ron Luchesse	Series regular (8 episodes)
1992	Law & Order	Charles Meadow	Episode: "Wedded Bliss"
1993–2019	Mad About You	Ira Buchman	Series regular (143 episodes) Nominated—SAG Award for Outstanding Performance by an Ensemble in a Comedy Series (1995–98)
1995	Duckman	Additional Characters (voices)	Episode: "Research and Destroy"
1996	Aaahh!!! Real Monsters	Blook The Granfaloon (voice)	Episode: "The Master Monster/Slumber Scare"
2002	Ally McBeal	Barry Dekumbis	2 episodes
2004	Without a Trace	Brian Owen	Episode: "Exposure"
2006	Law & Order: Criminal Intent	Phil Lambier	Episode: "Cruise to Nowhere"
2006	The Book of Daniel	Charlie Conlin	2 episodes
2008	Law & Order	Assistant District Attorney Josh Lethem	Episode: "Illegal"
2009	The Electric Company	Stan Flea	Episode: "Mighty Bright Fight"
2011	Law & Order: LA	Attorney Byron	Episode: "East Pasadena"
2011	The Good Wife	Judge Cyril Handley	Episode: "Getting Off"
2011–2017	Episodes	Merc Lapidus	Series regular (40 episodes)
2012	Elementary	Edgar Knowles	Episode: "The Long Fuse"
2013	The Arrangement	Herman Mackey	Television film
2013	Doubt	Mr. Syd Newman	Television film
2014–2019	Madam Secretary	NASA Administrator Glenn	Recurring role (4 episodes)
2015	Law & Order: Special Victims Unit	Lenny Simmons	Episode: "Agent Provocateur"
2015–2016; 2021	Lucifer	Jimmy Barnes	3 episodes
2017–2018	Chicago P.D.	Tommy Wells	3 episodes
2018	Unorganized Crime	Father Anthony Corso	Television film
2018	Blue Bloods	John Romano	Episode: "The Devil You Know"
