= The Great Defender (TV series) =

American drama television series

- Genre: Drama
- Created by: Frank Renzulli
- Starring: Michael Rispoli; Peter Krause; Kelly Rutherford; Rhoda Gemignani; Richard Kiley
- Theme music composer: Jay Gruska
- Country of origin: United States
- Original language: English
- No. of seasons: 1
- No. of episodes: 8 (3 unaired)

Production
- Executive producers: Frank Cardea; George Schenck
- Producers: Sascha Schneider; Cathryn Michon
- Running time: 22 minutes
- Production company: Schenck/Cardea Productions

Original release
- Network: Fox
- Release: March 5 – July 31, 1995

The Great Defender is an American drama television series created by Frank Renzulli. The series stars Michael Rispoli, Peter Krause, Kelly Rutherford, Rhoda Gemignani and Richard Kiley. The series aired on Fox from March 5, 1995, to July 31, 1995.

== Cast ==
- Michael Rispoli as Lou Frischetti
- Peter Krause as Crosby Caufield III
- Kelly Rutherford as Frankie Collett
- Rhoda Gemignani as Pearl Frischetti
- Richard Kiley as Jason DeWitt

== Episodes ==
No.	Title	Directed by	Written by	Original release date
1	"Pilot"	Rick Wallace	Frank Cardea, Frank Renzulli & George Schenck	March 5, 1995
2	"I Wuz Robbed"	Win Phelps	Roger Lowenstein	July 10, 1995
3	"Naked Truth"	Kevin Inch	Cathryn Michon	July 17, 1995
4	"Def Poets Society"	Arlene Sanford	Terence Winter	July 24, 1995
5	"Camille"	Anita W. Addison	Rick Kellard & R.J. Stewart	July 31, 1995
6	"Holiday on Ice"	Dan Attias	Frank Cardea & George Schenck	Unaired
7	"Do You Need a Lawyer?"	Sandy Smolan	R.J. Stewart	Unaired
8	"Twelve Angry Men"	Félix Enríquez Alcalá	Frank Renzulli	Unaired
