= Rhoda Gemignani =

American actress (born 1939)

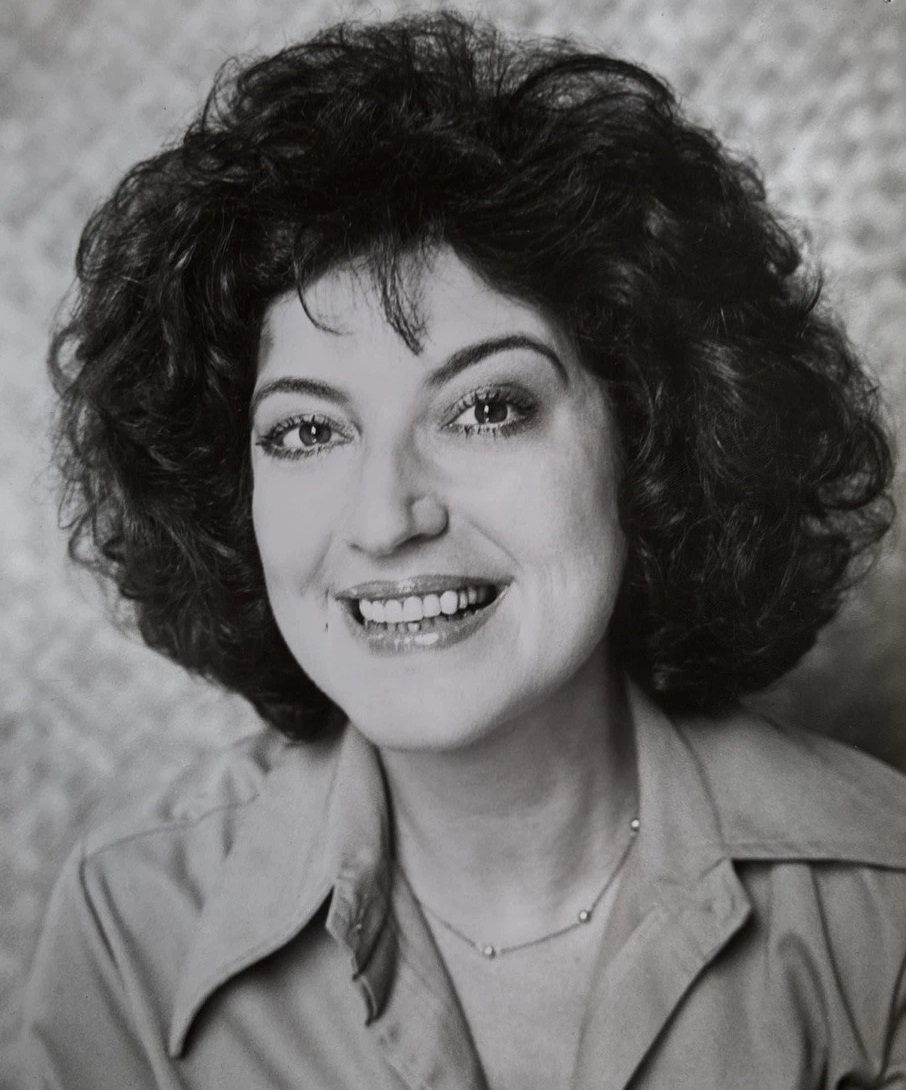
- Born: Rhoda Barbara Cohan; October 21, 1939 (age 86); Philadelphia, Pennsylvania
- Occupation: Actress
- Years active: 1970−present
- Spouse: Paul Gemignani (divorced)
- Relatives: Martin Cohan (brother)

Rhoda Gemignani (née Rhoda Barbara Cohan; born October 21, 1939) is an American actress, best known for her recurring role as Mrs. Carmela Rossini in the American television sitcom Who's the Boss?.

She appeared frequently on television between the 1970s to 2000s, primarily acting in comedic shows. In addition to portraying Mrs. Rossini on Who's The Boss?, Gemignani had recurring roles on The Bob Newhart Show and Just Shoot Me! Outside of comedy, she made guest appearances in Police Woman, Kojak, The Twilight Zone, Hill Street Blues, Walker, Texas Ranger and many others. She appeared in the films Ghostbusters (1984), Three Fugitives (1989), and The Man Who Wasn't There (2001).

== Career ==
Starting in the 1970s, Gemignani began appearing on several sitcoms, typically in small roles. Her work in this genre includes Diff'rent Strokes, The Jeffersons, Friends, Seinfeld and The Mary Tyler Moore Show. On Full House, she originated the role of Jesse Katsopolis' mother, Irene, before being replaced by Yvonne Wilder. She had a recurring role as Mrs. Rossini in long running sitcom Who's the Boss? (1984−92), appearing across all eight of the show's seasons.

In film, Gemignani appeared as a real estate agent in Ghostbusters (1984) and played the role of Costanza in The Man Who Wasn't There (2001). As a theater actress, Gemignani portrayed Cleopatra in play Caesar and Cleopatra, Titania in William Shakespeare's comedy A Midsummer Night's Dream, and Golde in a production of musical Fiddler on the Roof.

During the 1990s, she played major roles in two short-lived television shows: beautician Ruby DeMattis in sitcom Family Album and Pearl Frischetti on legal drama, The Great Defender. At the turn of the millennium, she appeared as the mother of Elliot DiMauro on Just Shoot Me! (1999−2003). Gemignani provided the voice of Gladys Fairfax and two other characters in the video game SWAT 4, released in 2005. Her only acting role during the 2010s was as Mrs. LeBlanc in the sitcom Episodes.

== Personal life ==
Gemignani was born as Rhoda Barbara Cohan on October 21, 1939, in Philadelphia, Pennsylvania, the daughter of Leo and Lillian Cohan. Her older brother, Martin Cohan, was a comedy writer who co-created Who's the Boss? Gemignani attended San Francisco State College. She married theater composer Paul Gemignani in 1961; they later divorced. She is Jewish.

== Filmography ==
=== Film ===
Year	Title	Role	Notes
1970	Sticky My Fingers... Fleet My Feet	Mother	Short
1980	Die Laughing	Russian ticket taker	
1984	Young Lust	Bernice Borsalino	
1984	Ghostbusters	Real Estate Woman	
1989	Three Fugitives	Radio Operator	
1999	Carlo's Wake	Aunt Betty	
2001	The Man Who Wasn't There	Costanza	

=== Television ===
Year	Title	Role	Notes
1963	General Hospital	Grace	
1973	The Mary Tyler Moore Show	Alice (uncredited)	Season 3 Episode 16: "Lou's Place"
1973–1974	The Bob Newhart Show	Joan Rossi	3 episodes
1975	The Jeffersons	Emily Bates	Season 2 Episode 12: "George and the Manager"
1976	Kojak	Katrina Patropolous	Season 3 Episode 15: "The Forgotten Room"
1976	NBC Special Treat	Aunt Olga	Season 1 Episode 5: "Papa and Me"
1976	Roxy Page	Anna Hagopian	TV Movie
1976	Doc	Mrs. Gerber	Season 2 Episode 1: "Carry on Nurse, Please"
1976	Police Woman	Francine	Season 3 Episode 4: "Sara Who?"
1977	Panic in Echo Park		TV Movie
1979	The Triangle Factory Fire Scandal	Mary Grasso	TV Movie
1981	Nero Wolfe	Mrs. Drossos	Season 1 Episode 1: "The Golden Spiders"
1981–1983	Diff'rent Strokes	Doctor / Mrs. Craig / Mrs. Valenti	3 episodes
1982	Farrell for the People	Mrs. Theodakis	TV Movie
1982	The Quest		Season 1 Episode 3: "He Stole-A My Art"
1983	The Facts of Life	Evelyn	Season 4 Episode 21: "Help from Home"
1984	Concrete Beat	Sylvie	TV Movie
1984	Mike Hammer	Mama Zinetta	Season 2 Episode 9: "A Death in the Family"
1984–1992	Who's the Boss?	Carmella Rossini	21 episodes (Recurring role)
1985	Hill Street Blues	Mrs. Biomonte	Season 5 Episode 22: "You're in Alice's"
1985	Goldie and the Bears	Dorothy	TV Movie
1986	The Twilight Zone	Angelina	Season 1 Episode 23: "Shadow Play/Grace Note" segment: "Grace Note"
1986	St. Elsewhere	Andrea Novino	Season 5 Episode 10: "Once Upon a Mattress"
1987	Moonlighting	Emily	Season 3 Episode 10: "Poltergeist III - Dipesto Nothing"
1987	Blood Vows: The Story of a Mafia Wife	Mama	TV Movie
1987	Hunter	Mrs. Palovsky	Season 3 Episode 18: "A Child Is Born"
1987	Full House	Irene Cochran	Season 1 Episode 4: "The Return of Grandma"
1988	Still the Beaver	Madame Rosa	Season 4 Episode 5: "Cursed Again"
1989	Paradise	Rusty Rolleri	Season 1 Episode 12: "The Traveler"
1989	Wiseguy	Marie (Present Day)	Season 3 Episode 6: "How Will They Remember Me?"
1989	Snoops	Madame Eleanor	Season 1 Episode 7: "The Sagittarian Candidate"
1990	Rock Hudson	TV Producer	TV Movie
1990	Babes	Aunt Marion	Season 1 Episode 9: "The Thanksgiving Show"
1990–1991	Jake and the Fatman	Carla Styles	2 episodes
1991	Eddie Dodd	Judge Taylor	Season 1 Episode 3: "Pound of Flesh"
1992	Seinfeld	Woman With Elaine	Season 3 Episode 13: "The Subway"
1992	Brooklyn Bridge	Mrs. Kaminsky	Season 2 Episode 6: "The Last Immigrant"
1993	Baywatch	Mama Torzini	Season 3 Episode 18: "Stakeout at Surfrider Beach"
1993	FBI: The Untold Stories	Arlyne	Season 2 Episode 14: "Mob Lady"
1993	Walker, Texas Ranger	Yelena	Season 1 Episode 1: "One Riot, One Ranger"
1993	Family Album	Rudy DeMattis	Series regular
1995	Charlie Grace	Miss Jacobs	Season 1 Episode 1: "Take Me to the Pilot"
1995	The Great Defender	Pearl Frischetti	Series regular
1996	Local Heroes	Mrs. Trakacs	Season 1 Episode 1: "Hometown Heroes"
1996	Life with Roger	Mrs. Costello	Season 1 Episode 7: "Love Thy Neighbor"
1997	Friends	Mrs. Potter	Season 4 Episode 4: "The One with the Ballroom Dancing"
1998	Caroline in the City	Gail	Season 3 Episode 20: "Caroline and the Little White Lies"
1998	The Closer	Laraine Verna	Season 1 Episode 7: "Honor Thy Jack"
1999	Netforce	Momma	TV Movie
1999	Rocky Marciano	Pasquelina Marchegiano	TV Movie
1999–2003	Just Shoot Me!	Rhoda DiMauro	8 episodes
2000	The What a Cartoon Show	Mamma Mia (voice)	Season 2 Episode 8: "Foe Paws"
2005	Related	Housing Services Secretary	Season 1 Episode 3: "Cry Me a Sister"
2015–2017	Episodes	Mrs. LeBlanc	2 episodes

=== Video games ===
Year	Title	Role	Notes
2005	SWAT 4	Gladys Fairfax / Sharon Conway / Female Hostage #4 (voice)	
