= The Class (TV series) =

2006 American TV series

- Genre: Sitcom
- Created by: David Crane; Jeffrey Klarik
- Directed by: James Burrows
- Starring: Jason Ritter; Lizzy Caplan; Heather Goldenhersh; Jesse Tyler Ferguson; Jon Bernthal; Andrea Anders; Sean Maguire; Lucy Punch
- Composer: Chad Fischer
- Country of origin: United States
- Original language: English
- No. of seasons: 1
- No. of episodes: 19

Production
- Executive producers: David Crane; Jeffery Klarik; James Burrows
- Producers: Lisa Helfrich Jackson; Tim Kaiser; Peter Chakos
- Production locations: Stage 24; Warner Bros. Studios; Studio City; Burbank, California
- Editor: Peter Chakos
- Camera setup: Multi-camera
- Running time: 30 minutes
- Production companies: CraneKlarik; Warner Bros. Television

Original release
- Network: CBS
- Release: September 18, 2006 – March 5, 2007

The Class is an American sitcom that originally ran on CBS from September 18, 2006, to March 5, 2007. The series followed the lives of eight very different alumni of the fictional Woodman Elementary School. The show was created by David Crane and Jeffrey Klarik's production company CraneKlarik in association with Warner Bros. Television.

On May 16, 2007, CBS cancelled the series after one season.

== Premise ==
The Class revolves around a core group of eight 28-year-olds who were all in the same third-grade class 20 years ago. A former classmate brings them all together for a party to celebrate his engagement to a girl he met in the class. However, she ends up dumping him at the party as the reunited classmates get to know each other. "They have separate lives and there are few connections that exist beforehand," Klarik said. "But through the course of the series, connections are made between the characters. It's about following their individual lives – there's no one living room where they gather."

== Cast and characters ==
=== Starring cast ===
- Jason Ritter as Ethan Haas
- Lizzy Caplan as Kat Warbler
- Heather Goldenhersh as Lina Warbler
- Jesse Tyler Ferguson as Richie Velch
- Jon Bernthal as Duncan Carmello
- Andrea Anders as Nicole Allen (née Campbell)
- Sean Maguire as Kyle Lendo
- Lucy Punch as Holly Ellenbogen

=== Recurring cast ===
- Julie Halston as Tina Carmello
- David Keith as Yonk Allen
- Sam Harris as Perry Pearl
- Jaime King as Palmer Wyland
- Sara Gilbert as Fern Velch
- Cristián de la Fuente as Aaron
- Karley Scott Collins as Oprah Pearl
- Trent Ford as Benjamin Chow

=== Characters ===
The main characters of The Class From top-left clockwise: Lina Warbler, Duncan Carmello, Nicole Allen, Kyle Lendo, Holly Ellenbogen, Richie Velch, Ethan Haas, and Kat Warbler

- Ethan L. Haas planned the ultimate surprise party for his beloved fiancée, Joanne Richman (Kasey Wilson): a reunion with their third-grade classmates to celebrate the 20th anniversary of the day they met. But Joanne felt he was smothering her and left. He is a pediatrician with a Golden Retriever, like his ex-fiancée. He met a woman named Sue who mistook him for a guy named Dan with whom she was supposed to have a blind date. When Ethan told Sue that he had lied about his identity at Oprah's birthday party (after many people, including Holly Ellenbogen, Perry Pearl, and Kyle Lendo, called him by his real name), she dumped him. He has developed a strong friendship with Kat and they have spent much time together. Ethan was the one who found out about Kat's boyfriend, Benjamin Chow, cheating on her with a girl named Susan, from Benjamin's son Jonah (who is one of Ethan's patients). By the end of the series, Ethan discovered he has romantic feelings for Kat and the storyline ended with him trying to pursue them.
- Kat Warbler is Lina's cynical fraternal twin sister whose sarcastic tongue hides her kind heart. She is a freelance photographer. She helps Ethan cope after he is dumped; behind her cynicism, she seems attracted to him. The two share a strong friendship. Her birthday is adjacent to Son of Sam's. She dated a world-famous violinist named Benjamin Chow, whom she had stalked for months, until she found that he had another girlfriend named Susan. She broke up with him when she asked him about it. Her storyline ended with her appearing to have a one-night stand with Duncan Carmello after she visits his house looking for her sister Lina, who was at the hospital.
- Lina Warbler, Kat's fraternal twin sister, wears her heart on her sleeve and remains optimistic about love. She received the telephone call about Ethan's party just as she found her boyfriend Adam, in her bed with another woman. She hit it off with Richie at the party, but their budding relationship has encountered significant obstacles – particularly, the revelation that Richie is married; although, it seems that she has forgiven him. After their first date, Richie accidentally ran over Lina's feet with his car, breaking 52 bones and causing her to wear casts until "The Class Has to Go to a Stupid Museum". She also got lost in a hurricane and was sent flying into a hybrid car holding her umbrella, which she said made her feel like Mary Poppins. Lina, a vegetarian, hosts a dinner party where she serves Moroccan chicken that Richie calls "The Hitler of Chickens". Lina and Richie became informally engaged at the end of the series.
- Duncan Carmello was a well-liked boy in school and is now a contractor who still lives with his mother, Tina Carmello. He had a relationship with Nicole Allen in high school but dumped her, a decision he now regrets. In "The Class Has a Snowday", it was revealed that he dumped her because she was "being a bitch" the night of Valentine's Day. After they spent the night of the party together, he got a job renovating her house while trying to win her back. In "The Class Springs a Leak", he had finished the renovations, prompting Nicole to decide whether she wants to stay with Yonk or leave him for Duncan. She chose Duncan, but she second-guessed it when Yonk landed in the hospital. Duncan refused to leave the relationship in limbo; his storyline ended with him appearing to have a one-night stand with Kat Warbler.
- Kyle Lendo was a popular boy in school; all the girls were in love with him. He took Holly Ellenbogen to their senior prom, but at the afterparty he was caught in bed with Michael from his Spanish class. He is now a first-grade teacher at Pembridge Academy, an elite private school, and lives with his boyfriend, Aaron. He goes to the reunion party hoping to make amends. He enjoys watching television, especially when Holly is reporting on the news. He has become good friends with Ethan since the party for Holly's daughter Oprah, where Ethan pretended to be someone named Dan Slutski. He also plays racquetball with Ethan. He appeared to lose contact with Holly after "The Class Runs into a Convenience Store".
- Richard (a.k.a. Richie) Brittany Velch was a quiet kid whose life had gone downhill since third grade; Ethan's party invitation interrupted nothing less than his suicide attempt. He and Lina hit it off at the party, but he accidentally ran over her feet with his car afterwards. At the hospital, an angry Kat told him to stay away and he went back to finish his suicide. He was just swallowing the pills when Kat called to tell him that Lina's first words were a request to see him again. Prior to the reunion, Richie had been a researcher at a pharmaceutical company; but after blowing the whistle on his employer, he lost that job and had to take another one trucking toxic waste to a landfill in New Jersey. He later reunited with Duncan Carmello, who was installing wheelchair ramps in Lina's apartment. Duncan invited him to help renovate Nicole and Yonk Allen's house and even offered him a permanent position upon completion of that job. Though (unhappily) married when he met Lina, he left his wife soon afterwards – something he'd been trying to work up the courage to do for years. At the series' end, he proposed to Lina and she accepted. In high school, he worked at the local RadioShack and had a crush on Melanie Deacon.
- Nicole Allen (formerly Nicole Campbell) is a pretty woman who was popular in high school. She was in love with Duncan, but he dumped her on Valentine's Day. She is now the unfulfilled, but loving, trophy wife of former pro-football player Yonk Allen. After the party, she spent the night with Duncan but went back to her husband. When Duncan visited her house, he realized he'd been on the construction crew for it. He pointed out how badly it had been built, and Nicole got Yonk to agree to hire Duncan to fix it up. Yonk knew so little about his wife's likes and dislikes that he gifted her a stripping pole for their anniversary. In "The Class Springs a Leak", Nicole decided to leave Yonk for Duncan – but in the final episode, she expresses doubt after Yonk suffers a heart attack. Her final decision is unknown.
- Holly Ellenbogen was Kyle Lendo's senior prom date, but she was heartbroken when she discovered him cheating on her with a guy at the afterparty. She is now a successful television news reporter. She is married to Perry Pearl, an interior decorator; they have a daughter, Oprah Pearl. Holly attended the reunion party mainly to rub her happiness in Kyle's face. Oprah is eventually admitted to Pembridge Academy and enrolled in Kyle's first-grade class. Holly seems oblivious to her husband's embodiment of a flamboyantly gay stereotype, a running joke among the other classmates. She apparently gets this trait from her mother, who is also married to an effeminate man. The character's final appearance was somewhat of a cliffhanger in "The Class Visits a Bad Neighborhood", in which Fern Velch vows over the phone to "get her" after Richie, at gunpoint, tells her he is dating "Holly Ellenbogen" – blurting out what he thought sounded like a made-up name – to protect Lina. Actress Lucy Punch left the show due to creative changes implemented by the executive producers. But Perry makes an appearance in both "The Class Has a Snow Day" and the finale, confirming that Holly is okay.

=== Recurring characters ===
- Tina Carmello is Duncan's mother, who means well but can sometimes be a bit overbearing. She did show understanding when Nicole came by her house to be with Duncan, and she left them alone. She frequently appears at unexpected times – particularly when she is revealed to be eavesdropping on Duncan's telephone conversations. According to Duncan, she also steals.
- Yonk Allen is a legendary University of Tennessee and Philadelphia Eagles football player and spokesman for a line of barbecue grills (of which it turns out that one in every fifty blow up). He seems to put his personal achievements – including playing in the Super Bowl, earning money from his barbecue grill endorsements, and having dinner at the White House – ahead of Nicole and her feelings. He is aware of his wife's and Duncan's former relationship; while uncomfortable with it, he uses Duncan to get insight into his wife's psyche. Nicole is his third wife. His first wife's name is unknown. His second is named Eileen; he is still in contact with her. He's also mistaken Nicole for her at least once. He has at least two daughters from previous marriages: one who is attractive, and one who inherited his build and her mother's personality; an unrefined character named Penny. He is good friends with Jerry Rice. At the end of "The Class Rides a Bull", he has a heart attack. He undergoes a quintuple bypass surgery; his fate is unknown.
- Perry Pearl is Holly's husband, a highly effeminate man. Kyle and Aaron find him to be an amusing stereotype of a "gay" personality: he is very excitable, acts as the family gourmand, regularly instructs his wife on how to dress, and purposely failed to hire puppeteers for his daughter's birthday party so that he would have an excuse to put on his own sock-puppet musical revue. But despite all this, he is, according to himself, heterosexual. He appears to have a platonic boy-crush on Aaron. Perry is an interior decorator, and was hired by Nicole Allen to redecorate her home.
- Palmer Wyland is Ethan's ex-girlfriend. She went to art school with Kat, who strongly dislikes her. Palmer used to have a crush on Kat. She is also a photographer, and usually takes pictures of fruit in costumes, which annoys Kat. She is known not to be particularly bright. Her relationship with Ethan is more sexual than serious. They recently broke up.
- Fern Velch, Richie's ex-wife, works as a cleaning lady in Lina's office. She was his first (and only) girlfriend in college. Richie has recently left her after years of unhappiness. She responded with a death threat to Holly Ellenbogen (the woman whom she thought stole Richie away). It was revealed in the episode "The Class Hits It" that Richie had only ever slept with Fern, and that she'd literally booed him during intercourse. She also complained that it was like a damp, old man was dying on top of her.
- Aaron is Kyle's live-in boyfriend. Holly has difficulty understanding him, supposedly due to his heavy Hispanic accent, though in reality it is not very strong. He is not fond of Holly, but tolerates her for Kyle's sake. He is a software engineer for an internet security company. Sometime after "The Class Hits It", he travels to Chile and returns at the end of "The Class Goes Back to the Hospital".
- Oprah Liza Pearl is the name of Holly and Perry's daughter, whom Perry named after Oprah Winfrey and Liza Minnelli. Her babysitter's name is Samantha. She has a birthday in the episode "The Class Celebrates a Birthday". She attends Pembridge Academy, where Kyle Lendo is her teacher.
- Benjamin Chow is an internationally known English violinist, and Kat's ex-boyfriend. Kat used to stalk him before they dated (and he did forgive her after he found out). Kat was actually his mistress; he has a girlfriend named Susan. He has a son, Jonah, who is one of Ethan's patients.
- Penny Allen is Yonk's daughter, and Nicole's stepdaughter. Her biological mother is Yonk's first wife. She has been described as having Yonk's build and her mother's (presumably unpleasant) personality. Yonk nicknames her "Shrek" and Duncan nicknames her "The Creature". She doesn't appreciate waiting for food.

== Production history ==
=== Conception ===
The idea for The Class and the ...teacher came about when show creators David Crane and Jeffrey Klarik were cleaning their basement and they found a box of David Crane's school photographs of him with his third grade class. The pair wondered what the third graders were like now and if they were happy with their lives or not.

Due to the overwhelming reputation of the creators, CBS, Fox, and NBC made bids for a full 13-episode season, the latter network was also reported to have offered a 22 episode commitment, prior to seeing a pilot. Ultimately, CBS won the bidding war with an undisclosed amount.

==== Casting ====
In December 2005, English actress Lucy Punch was the first lead to be cast for the show.

Next to be cast, in January 2006, were Jason Ritter and Jesse Tyler Ferguson as Ethan Haas and Richie Velch, respectively.

In February 2006 Jon Bernthal, Heather Goldenhersh, and Andrea Anders (who at the time was still part of the cast of Friends spin off Joey, which was on hiatus) were cast as Duncan Carmello, Lina Warbler, and Nicole Allen. Legendary sitcom director James Burrows was also announced to be directing the pilot.

In March 2006 Eve star Sean Maguire was cast as Kyle Lendo.

Last to be cast was Lizzy Caplan as the cynical Kat Warbler. Caplan was still part of The WB drama Related at the time. Related was cancelled due to the merger of UPN and The WB to create The CW.

Also, during the middle of 2006, it was announced that Julie Halston, Sam Harris, and David Keith had been cast in co-starring roles.

It was later announced that Roseanne's Sara Gilbert had been cast in the recurring role of Fern Velch, Richie Velch's wife.

Aaron Paul, who later would secure a breakout role as Jesse Pinkman on AMC's Breaking Bad, says that he was a finalist for two of The Class's lead roles, but passed over each time by the network. Afterward, he experienced depression, but says he was serendipitously only available to audition for Breaking Bad because he wasn't committed to The Class.

=== Broadcast history ===
The Class premiered at 8:00 p.m. on September 18, 2006, on CBS, after being picked up by CBS before they had even seen the pilot episode, The Class Reunites, possibly due to the reputation of its creators, one of which created Friends, the other, a producer of Mad About You.

Everybody Loves Raymond showrunner Phil Rosenthal stated that a proposed spin-off of his long-running series (focusing on Brad Garrett as Ray's brother) was passed over by CBS so that The Class could make it to series.

As of October 9, 2006, CBS shifted the show to the 8:30 p.m. time slot, because its disappointing ratings were affecting the success of How I Met Your Mother in its second year. The ratings then began to steadily improve, and, on Monday October 23, 2006, CBS ordered six more episodes of The Class, bringing the episode order for the first season to 19. The pickup was conditional on the cost to CBS per episode being reduced compared to the initial episode order – this was the catalyst to Lucy Punch being fired from the show as there wasn't enough money to continue the show with eight main cast members, and also saw the total staff numbers halved.

The Class was the first sitcom to show a live table read session and a live rehearsal. They were shown on Monday January 15, 2007 at 11am PST and Wednesday January 17, 2007 at 1pm PST, respectively. The webcasts were available after the live feed as well.

The Class ended its first season on March 5, 2007.

=== Cancellation ===
On May 11, 2007, Zap2It reported that The Class had been canceled, with rumors it was to be replaced by The New Adventures of Old Christine. On May 15, 2007, Variety reported that The Class would not return for a second season. On May 16, 2007, The Class was officially canceled at the CBS Upfront presentation, and replaced with The Big Bang Theory. On May 17, 2007, Jesse Tyler Ferguson posted a message on his MySpace page relating to the cancellation, as did Sam Harris, explaining that the fate of The Class was undecided until the last minute.

Shortly after the cancellation, fans of the show launched a campaign to try to save The Class. The campaign proved to be unsuccessful. The campaign consisted of sending erasers, because of their connection to a school and education, and sending in printed off Moroccan Chicken recipes because of a memorable episode of The Class which saw Lina cooking Moroccan Chicken for Kat, Ethan, Benjamin, Palmer, Richie, Kyle, Duncan, and Nicole.

== Episodes ==
Every episode of the series was directed by James Burrows.

| No. | Title | Written by | Original release date | Prod. code |
|---|---|---|---|---|
| 1 | "Pilot" | David Crane & Jeffrey Klarik | September 18, 2006 | 276004 |
Ethan plans a class reunion for his third grade class.
| 2 | "The Class Visits a Hospital" | David Crane & Jeffrey Klarik | September 25, 2006 | 3T5151 |
Ethan and Kat visit Lina in hospital, after she gets run over by Richie.
| 3 | "The Class Learns About Hurricanes" | Mike Sikowitz | October 2, 2006 | 3T5152 |
Holly reports on the approach of Hurricane Fernanda.
| 4 | "The Class Blows the Whistle" | Brian Buckner | October 9, 2006 | 3T5153 |
Richie and Lina go on their first date.
| 5 | "The Class Gets Frozen Yogurt" | Steven Molaro | October 16, 2006 | 3T5154 |
Ethan and Kat sample a lot of frozen yogurt.
| 6 | "The Class Goes Trick-or-Treating" | Amanda Lasher | October 23, 2006 | 3T5155 |
Holly reports about the Upper Derby Autumn Festival.
| 7 | "The Class Goes to a Bar" | Corey Nickerson | November 6, 2006 | 3T5156 |
Nicole, Richie, and Lina go to see Duncan's band, Carfire, perform at a bar.
| 8 | "The Class Celebrates a Birthday" | David Crane & Jeffrey Klarik | November 13, 2006 | 3T5157 |
Ethan joins his girlfriend and her son at her son's friend's birthday party, only to discover that the party is for Holly's daughter, Oprah Pearl.
| 9 | "The Class Gives Thanks" | Jonathan Green & Gabe Miller | November 20, 2006 | 3T5158 |
Richie and Lina break up. Meanwhile, everyone else holds their own Thanksgiving festivities.
| 10 | "The Class Runs Into a Convenience Store" | David Crane & Jeffrey Klarik | November 27, 2006 | 3T5159 |
Richie crashes his car into the local convenience store.
| 11 | "The Class Celebrates an Anniversary" | Teleplay: Mike Sikowitz; Story: David Crane & Jeffrey Klarik | December 11, 2006 | 3T5160 |
Yonk and Nicole celebrate their one-year wedding anniversary. Richie and Lina get back together.
| 12 | "The Class Visits a Bad Neighborhood" | Sue Murphy | January 8, 2007 | 3T5161 |
Richie, Nicole and Duncan run into Fern, who's brandishing a gun.
| 13 | "The Class Hits It" | Doty Abrams | January 15, 2007 | 3T5162 |
Richie and Lina spend their first night together.
| 14 | "The Class Has to Go to a Stupid Museum" | Teleplay: Jonathan Green & Gabe Miller; Story: Corey Nickerson | January 22, 2007 | 3T5163 |
Ethan and Kyle listen in on a conversation between Kat and Benjamin. Lina gets out of her wheelchair.
| 15 | "The Class Eats Moroccan Chicken" | Teleplay: Steven Molaro; Story: David Crane & Jeffrey Klarik | February 5, 2007 | 3T5164 |
Lina and Richie host their first event as a couple; Lina serves some disgusting Moroccan chicken.
| 16 | "The Class Has a Snow Day" | Teleplay: David Crane & Jeffrey Klarik; Story: Mike Sikowitz | February 12, 2007 | 3T5165 |
Everyone gets snowed in at each other's houses on Valentine's Day.
| 17 | "The Class Springs a Leak" | David Crane and Jeffrey Klarik | February 19, 2007 | 3T5166 |
Nicole floods her house trying to create a reason to keep Duncan around.
| 18 | "The Class Rides a Bull" | Teleplay: Mike Sikowitz; Story: David Crane & Jeffrey Klarik | February 26, 2007 | 3T5167 |
Nicole finally decides to leave Yonk for Duncan. To give herself time to pack, she has Duncan and Richie keep Yonk occupied with dinner at a steakhouse.
| 19 | "The Class Goes Back to the Hospital" | David Crane and Jeffrey Klarik | March 5, 2007 | 3T5168 |
The class returns to the hospital after Yonk has a heart attack.

== American television ratings ==
=== Standard ratings ===
| Episode # | Title | Air date | Rating | Share | 18–49 | Viewers | Rank |
|---|---|---|---|---|---|---|---|
| 1 | "The Class Reunites" | September 18, 2006 | 6.9 | 11 | 3.7 | 10.60 | #42 |
| 2 | "The Class Visits a Hospital" | September 25, 2006 | 5.7 | 9 | 2.8 | 8.51 | #48 |
| 3 | "The Class Learns About Hurricanes" | October 2, 2006 | 5.5 | 9 | 2.8 | 8.00 | #55 |
| 4 | "The Class Blows the Whistle" | October 9, 2006 | 6.5 | 10 | 3.7 | 10.05 | #44 |
| 5 | "The Class Gets Frozen Yogurt" | October 16, 2006 | 5.6 | 8 | 3.1 | 8.70 | #51 |
| 6 | "The Class Goes Trick-or-Treating" | October 23, 2006 | 5.5 | 8 | 2.9 | 8.12 | #55 |
| 7 | "The Class Goes to a Bar" | November 6, 2006 | 4.9 | 7 | 2.9 | 7.70 | #58 |
| 8 | "The Class Celebrates a Birthday" | November 13, 2006 | 5.5 | 8 | 3.0 | 8.52 | #51 |
| 9 | "The Class Gives Thanks" | November 20, 2006 | 5.4 | 8 | 2.9 | 8.32 | #50 |
| 10 | "The Class Runs Into a Convenience Store" | November 27, 2006 | 5.5 | 8 | 3.1 | 8.71 | #47 |
| 11 | "The Class Celebrates an Anniversary" | December 11, 2006 | 5.5 | 8 | 3.1 | 8.74 | |
| 12 | "The Class Visits a Bad Neighbourhood" | January 8, 2007 | 5.1 | 7 | 2.9 | 7.76 | #53 |
| 13 | "The Class Hits It" | January 15, 2007 | 4.5 | 6 | 2.7 | 7.07 | #52 |
| 14 | "The Class Has to Go to a Stupid Museum" | January 22, 2007 | 5.7 | 8 | 3.2 | 8.99 | #29 |
| 15 | "The Class Eats Moroccan Chicken" | February 5, 2007 | 6.2 | 9 | 3.6 | 9.72 | #40 |
| 16 | "The Class Has a Snow Day" | February 12, 2007 | 5.9 | 9 | 3.3 | 8.97 | #45 |
| 17 | "The Class Springs a Leak" | February 19, 2007 | 5.5 | 8 | 3.3 | 8.80 | #39 |
| 18 | "The Class Rides a Bull" | February 26, 2007 | 5.7 | 9 | 3.5 | 8.90 | #44 |
| 19 | "The Class Goes Back to the Hospital" | March 5, 2007 | 5.8 | 9 | 3.2 | 8.77 | #34 |

Key: "Rating" is the estimated percentage of all TVs tuned to the show, "share" is the percentage of all TVs in use that are tuned in. "18–49" is the percentage of all 18- to 49-year olds watching the program. "Viewers" is the estimated number of actual people watching, in millions. "Rank" is the place in which the episode ranked up against all of the shows broadcast during the week that the episode was aired.

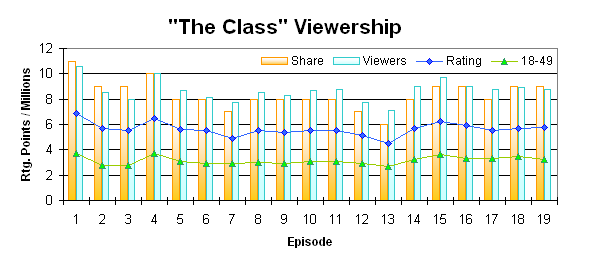
Chart Showing Ratings, 18–49 Ratings, and Viewers for each episode

=== Seasonal ratings ===
Seasonal rankings (based on average total viewers per episode) of The Class on CBS:

Note: Each U.S. network television season starts in late September and ends in late May, or occasionally early June, which coincides with the completion of May sweeps.

| Season | Timeslot (EDT) | Series premiere | Series finale | TV season | Rank | Viewers (in millions) | 18–49 Rating/Share (rank) |
|---|---|---|---|---|---|---|---|
| 1 | Monday 8:00 P.M. (September 18, 2006 – October 2, 2006) Monday 8:30 P.M.(October 9, 2006 – March 5, 2007) | September 18, 2006 | March 5, 2007 | 2006–2007 | #65 | 8.4 | 3.0/8 (#61) |

=== Ratings competition ===
The Class aired against Prison Break on Fox, Deal or No Deal on NBC, Wife Swap on ABC, and All of Us on The CW. During the first few episodes The Class was up against 7th Heaven and then Everybody Hates Chris. The Class consistently surpassed Wife Swap, All of Us, 7th Heaven, and Everybody Hates Chris in the ratings.

== Reception ==
=== Critical reaction ===
The Class received mostly mixed reviews. On Rotten Tomatoes, 44% of 9 critics gave it a positive review, with an average rating of 7.4/10. Metacritic gave it a rating of 59 out of 100 based on reviews from 27 critic, indicating mixed or average reviews.

The most positive reviews came from The Philadelphia Inquirer and The Hollywood Reporter.

=== Awards ===
The Class won the Favorite New TV Comedy Award at the 33rd People's Choice Awards. It was up against 30 Rock and 'Til Death. 30 Rock and 'Til Death were both renewed for second seasons while The Class was not.

The Class was also nominated by the Art Director's Guild for Excellence in Production Design for a Multi Camera Television Series, this was for the Pilot episode, The Class Reunites. Mad TV won the award.

In July 2007, The Class was nominated for the 59th Primetime Emmy Award in the category of Outstanding Art Direction for a Multi-Camera Series, the show lost to How I Met Your Mother.

==== Won ====
- People's Choice Award — Favorite New TV Comedy: Also Nominated: 30 Rock, 'Til Death

==== Nominated ====
- Art Directors Guild — Excellence in Production Design for a Multi Camera Television Series: for the episode "The Class Reunites"
- Emmy Award — Outstanding Art Direction for a Multi-Camera Series: for the episode "The Class Reunites"
