= David Crane (producer) =

American writer and producer

- Born: August 13, 1957 (age 69); West New York, New Jersey, U.S.
- Education: Brandeis University
- Occupations: Writer; producer
- Years active: 1987–present
- Notable work: Friends; Episodes
- Spouse: Jeffrey Klarik
- Relatives: Milton Rackmil (stepfather)

David Crane (born August 13, 1957) is an American writer and producer. He is best known as one of the co-creators of the television sitcoms Friends and Episodes.

== Early life ==
Crane was born in West New York, New Jersey, the son of Joan Crane and veteran Philadelphia television personality Gene Crane in a traditional Jewish household. He attended Harriton High School in Pennsylvania and graduated from there in 1975. He is a 1979 graduate of Brandeis University.

== Career ==
He and his husband, Jeffrey Klarik (creator of Half & Half, co-producer Mad About You), created the 2006 ensemble sitcom The Class.

In 2011, Crane and Klarik created a sitcom called Episodes for the UK-based BBC. Airing first in the US on Showtime on Sunday January 9, 2011 and then on BBC Two on Monday January 10, 2011, it features Friends star Matt LeBlanc and Green Wing's Stephen Mangan and Tamsin Greig.

== Filmography ==
=== Television ===
Year	Title	Creator	Executive producer	Producer	Writer	Notes
1987	Everything's Relative	No	No	No	Yes	Episode: "It Had to Be You and You"
1990–1993	Dream On	Yes	Yes	Yes	Yes	Creator of 119 episodes Writer of 17 episodes Producer of 14 episodes Co-Executive Producer of 40 episodes Creative Consultant of 24 episodes CableACE Award for Comedy Series (1992); CableACE Award for Writing a Comedy Series for episode "For Peter's Sake" (1993); Nominated – CableACE Award for Comedy Series (1991, 1993, 1994); Nominated – Primetime Emmy Award for Outstanding Writing in a Comedy Series for episode "For Peter's Sake" (1993)
1991	Sunday Dinner	No	No	No	Yes	Episode: "In Sickness and in Health"
1992–1993	The Powers That Be	Yes	No	No	Yes	21 episodes; Writer 2 episodes (teleplay); Episode: "The Love Child (Part 1 & 2)" (1992)
1993	Family Album	Yes	Yes	No	Yes	Creator of 6 episodes Writer of 2 episodes Executive Producer of 6 episodes
1994	Couples	No	No	No	No	Television Movie; Associate Producer
1994–2004	Friends	Yes	Yes	No	Yes	Creator/Executive Producer of 236 episodes Writer of 18 episodes Online Film & Television Association Award for Best Writing in a Comedy Series (2002); Primetime Emmy Award for Outstanding Comedy Series (2002); TV Quick Award for Best Comedy Show (2004); Nominated – Gold Derby Award for Episode of the Year for episode "The Last One (Part 1 & 2)" (2004); Nominated – Primetime Emmy Award for Outstanding Comedy Series (1995, 1996, 1999, 2000, 2003)
1996	Crashendo	No	No	No	Yes	Short film; Story by
1997–2000	Veronica's Closet	Yes	Yes	No	Yes	Creator of 67 episodes Writer of 3 episodes (including "Unaired Pilot"); Executive Producer of 67 episodes (including "Unaired Pilot")
1998–2000	Jesse	No	Yes	No	No	Executive Producer of 34 episodes
2004–2006	Joey	No	No	No	No	46 episodes; character developer: Joey Tribbiani
2006–2007	The Class	Yes	Yes	No	Yes	Creator of 19 episodes Writer of 6 episodes Executive Producer of 19 episodes
2011–2017	Episodes	Yes	Yes	No	Yes	Creator/Writer/Executive Producer for 41 episodes Nantucket Film Festival Award for Creative Impact in Television Writing Award (2017); Nominated – Primetime Emmy Award for Outstanding Writing for a Comedy Series for episode "Episode Seven" (2011); Nominated – Writers Guild Award for New Series (2012); Nominated – British Academy Television Award for Best Situation Comedy (2013); Nominated – Primetime Emmy Award for Outstanding Writing for a Comedy Series for episode "209" (2013); Nominated – Writers Guild Award for Episodic Comedy for episode "Episode Nine" (2013); Nominated – Primetime Emmy Award for Outstanding Writing for a Comedy Series for episode "Episode 305" (2014); Nominated – Primetime Emmy Award for Outstanding Writing for a Comedy Series for episode "Episode 409" (2015)
2021	Friends: The Reunion	No	Yes	Yes	No	
