= Paul Gemignani =

American musical director

Paul Gemignani (born November 8, 1938) is an American musical director with a career on Broadway and West End theatre spanning over forty years.

== Career ==
Gemignani began his career in 1971 as a replacement musical director for Stephen Sondheim's Follies, eventually leading the cast on the subsequent tour. Since then, he has been the musical director for over 38 Broadway and West End musicals, including the following Tony Award-winning productions: A Little Night Music (1973), Sweeney Todd (1979), Evita (1979), Jerome Robbins' Broadway (1989), Crazy for You (1992), Passion (1994), Kiss Me, Kate (1999), Into the Woods (2002), and Assassins (2004). Other well-known Broadway productions have included Candide (1974), Grind (1975), Pacific Overtures (1976), Side By Side By Sondheim (1977), On the Twentieth Century (1978), Merrily We Roll Along (1981), A Doll's Life (1982), Zorba (1983), The Rink (1984), Pulitzer Prize winner Sunday in the Park with George (1984), Big: the musical (1996), High Society (1998), The Frogs (2004), and 110 in the Shade (2007).

Gemignani has been the musical director for three separate productions of Sweeney Todd, including the original Broadway and London productions (1979–1982), the Royal Opera House production in London (2003–2004) and the 2007 film version with Johnny Depp (music conductor and supervisor). He has been involved in most of the other presentations of Sweeney in the last twenty years.

Gemignani has recorded numerous cast albums and albums featuring musical theatre and opera singers with American Theatre Orchestra and other orchestras. He has been a guest conductor with the Boston Symphony Orchestra, the San Francisco Symphony, the Buffalo Philharmonic, the Philadelphia Orchestra, the Baltimore Symphony, the Royal Philharmonic Orchestra, the London Symphony Orchestra, New York City Opera, Lyric Opera of Chicago, Royal Opera, and New York City Ballet. He has conducted such films as Kramer vs. Kramer (1979), Reds (1981), and Sweeney Todd (2007), as well as many television specials, including several installments of Great Performances.

=== Awards ===
He was the recipient of a 1989 Drama Desk Special Award and a 2001 Tony Award for Special Lifetime Achievement. In 2006, he received an Emmy Award for "best musical direction" for the PBS/Great Performances presentation of Rodgers and Hammerstein's South Pacific in concert from Carnegie Hall. Gemignani was honored in an all-star concert, "Another Op'nin, Another Show: A Musical Tribute To Paul Gemignani" on March 30, 2008. In 2008, Gemignani conducted Camelot at Lincoln Center and was the music director for the Broadway revival of Pal Joey which opened in December 2008.

In 2010, he was inducted into the American Theatre Hall of Fame.

Gemignani served as one of two music supervisors (Michael Higham) for Disney's 2018 musical film "Mary Poppins Returns." His contribution earned him a Guild of Music Supervisors Awards nomination for Best Music Supervision for Films Budgeted Over $25 Million. The film starred Emily Blunt as the titular character and Lin-Manuel Miranda as Jack.

== Personal life ==
He is married to actress Derin Altay. He has a son, Alexander Gemignani, from his previous marriage to Carolann Page as well as a stepson, August, from his marriage to Derin Altay. Paul Gemignani was also formerly married to Rhoda Cohan. A biography of Gemignani, GEMIGNANI: Life and Lessons from Broadway and Beyond by Margaret Hall was published in May 2022 by Applause Theatre and Cinema Books.
