= Mortal Thoughts =

1991 film by Alan Rudolph

- Theatrical release poster
- Directed by: Alan Rudolph
- Written by: William Reilly; Claude Kerven
- Produced by: John Fiedler; Mark Tarlov; Demi Moore
- Starring: Demi Moore; Glenne Headly; Bruce Willis; John Pankow; Harvey Keitel
- Cinematography: Elliot Davis
- Edited by: Tom Walls
- Music by: Mark Isham
- Production companies: New Vision Pictures; Polar Entertainment Corporation; Rufglen Films
- Distributed by: Columbia Pictures
- Release date: April 19, 1991
- Running time: 103 minutes
- Country: United States
- Language: English
- Budget: $7 million
- Box office: $18.8 million

Mortal Thoughts is a 1991 American neo-noir psychological thriller film directed by Alan Rudolph and starring Demi Moore, Glenne Headly, Bruce Willis, John Pankow, and Harvey Keitel. Told in narrative flashbacks set in a police interrogation, the film centers on a woman implicated in the violent murder of her friend's abusive, drug-addicted husband. Its title is derived from a quote in William Shakespeare's The Tragedy of Macbeth.

In addition to starring in the film, Moore also served as a co-producer, and offered to pay the cast and crew overtime when the film's original director, Claude Kerven, was fired and replaced by Rudolph.

== Plot ==
Cynthia Kellogg is interrogated by Detective John Woods and Detective Linda Nealon at a police station regarding the murder of her husband, Artie. Cynthia provides a deposition, relayed in detailed flashbacks. Cynthia recounts her employment as a hairdresser at her friend Joyce's hair salon in Bayonne, New Jersey. Joyce's husband, Jimmy, is a violently abusive drug addict, and Joyce expresses a desire to kill him several times. One night, Cynthia accompanies Joyce and Jimmy to a Feast of Saint Rocco festival. After Jimmy becomes drunk and picks a fight with Joyce, he heads back to their van. Cynthia follows him and takes the keys, leaving him to sleep in the back of the vehicle.

According to Cynthia's account of events, the two women returned to the van later on to find Jimmy dead inside, his throat slashed; Cynthia claims Joyce admitted to cutting his neck after she went to check on him, during which he attacked her. Cynthia states that, at Joyce's insistence, the women disposed of Jimmy's body by dumping it in a ravine. After the murder, Cynthia returns home covered in blood and admits to her husband, Artie, what happened. Several days later, after Jimmy's body is found, Joyce's paranoia about being caught causes her to act increasingly erratically. At one point, she instructs Cynthia to kill one of the hairdressers at the salon out of fear she will tarnish the women's alibis. Joyce subsequently discovers that Artie knows about the murder, and she threatens Cynthia that she will kill him to silence him. Cynthia does not believe Joyce can actually carry out her threats; however, after Artie is found shot dead at his home on Christmas Eve, Cynthia accuses Joyce.

Throughout Cynthia's interrogation, Detective Woods is skeptical of her descriptions of events and challenges her on them, but ultimately allows her to leave. Cynthia exits the police station, but pauses and recalls the details of what actually happened at the festival: Upon bringing Jimmy to the van, he attempted to rape Cynthia and began beating her. In self-defense, she slashed his throat with a box cutter. Cynthia and Joyce left the festival and began driving toward a hospital; however, when Joyce realized he had tried to rape Cynthia, she turned the van around and began driving in another direction, biding time while Jimmy bled to death in the back of the van. After he died, the women disposed of his body and made a pact not to tell anyone.

As Cynthia stands outside the police station recalling the truth of what occurred, Joyce is brought inside for her own interrogation. Cynthia decides to re-enter the station, now prepared to tell the truth of her guilt in Jimmy's death. She sits before Detective Woods' camera to record her taped confession.

== Cast ==
- Demi Moore as Cynthia Kellogg
- Glenne Headly as Joyce Urbanski
- Bruce Willis as James "Jimmy" Urbanski
- Harvey Keitel as Detective John Woods
- Billie Neal as Detective Linda Nealon
- John Pankow as Arthur "Artie" Kellogg
- Frank Vincent as Dominic, Joyce's father

== Production ==
=== Development ===
The film's title is derived from a quote in William Shakespeare's The Tragedy of Macbeth by Lady Macbeth, in which she says: "Come, you spirits / That tend on mortal thoughts, unsex me here, / And fill me from the crown to the toe top-full / Of direst cruelty."

The script was written by William Reilly and Claude Kerven. Kerven, who had won an Oscar for Best Short, was the original director. The project was set up at New Visions, the company of Taylor Hackford. Hackford attracted the interest of Demi Moore, who agreed to come on as star and co-producer. New Visions sold the film to Columbia prior to filming.

=== Casting ===
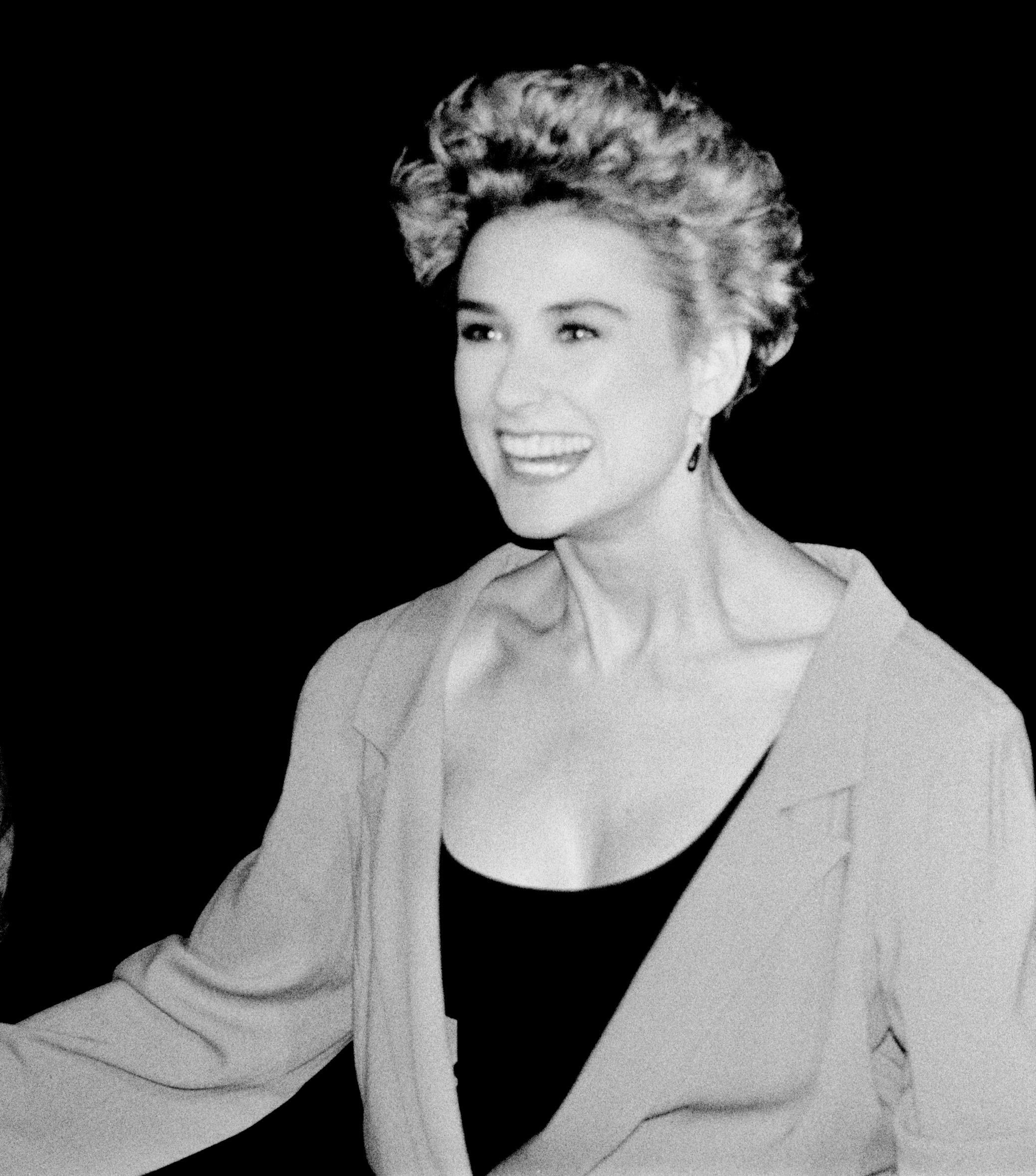
Demi Moore (pictured in 1990) both starred in and co-produced the film

Demi Moore, who had recently starred in Ghost (1990), was drawn to the project as she felt playing a character with a New Jersey dialect was a challenge. "I’d never done a dialect before, like theater actresses such as Meryl Streep and Glenn Close, and the child in me was excited to try it. Another appeal was the intense loyalty between the two women, the love and trust that made it OK to live in marriages that didn’t work. Like a lot of us, they accept the familiar, even if it’s not good... and find other outlets that are workable." Bruce Willis, Moore's then-husband, was cast in the role of Jimmy, the abusive husband of Glenne Headly's character. Moore stated that both she and Willis had a mutual interest in the film as it partly dealt with substance abuse issues, which both had experienced in their own lives.

=== Filming ===
Principal photography of Mortal Thoughts occurred in February 1990 and lasted 32 days. Filming took place entirely in New Jersey, in Bayonne, Jersey City, Little Ferry, and Scotch Plains. The film's carnival sequences were shot on location at Scotch Plains's Bowcraft Amusement Park. Claude Kerven, who co-wrote the screenplay, was originally hired to direct the project, but was fired after completing only one week of shooting. The producers also fired the cinematographer and co-star, Peter Gallagher. "It was just a difference of opinion," said Moore. "I was pushed into being part of a very difficult painful decision."

=== Alan Rudolph ===
The job of directing was offered to Alan Rudolph who said "I was hired at the last minute because there was a movie in trouble, and nobody would touch it... I wasn’t offered a lot of things, so it was movies that couldn’t get a director or a director dropped out. I just tried to make them work and get some of the people I’d been working with paid."

Rudolph recalled he came on board "The day before shooting. I loved it. I hate preparation. They were all in trouble so I knew they wouldn’t bother me for awhile. I knew I’d get a couple of weeks before anybody got the nerve to even say, “Excuse me, what if we did this,” because they were so afraid the thing was going to collapse."

The film shoot was partly improvisational, and the conclusion of the film was undetermined until it came time to shoot it. According to Rudolph when he came on board the film "didn’t even have the last twenty pages. I said, “Where’s the end?” They said, “Well, we haven’t gotten around to that”." Rudolph recalled: "No one really knew what the ending would be. A half-day before we shot it, we got together and decided what the ending should be." Rudolph elaborated "I didn’t want to shoot the Polanski ending, which is the one I think everybody wanted, where the person you’ve been investing your time with, you hate her after all this, because I spent a lot of time trying to like her! I got nailed for the ending, but it wasn’t 100% on me because they didn’t have anything."

Star Demi Moore served as a co-producer on the film; according to Rudolph, Moore was aware of the film's budgetary constraints, and took it upon herself to mitigate "the problems we were having." After Kerven was fired and the financiers of the production threatened to cancel it during the first week of shooting, Moore offered to pay overtime for the production herself.

According to Moore, her dual role as actress and co-producer led her to frequently working 16-hour days throughout the shoot. "I was dealing with scheduling and cost-efficiency—and there was no one to keep me from making too many mistakes," she recalled. "The role of ‘co-producer’ is much more hands-on, less creative than that of ‘executive producer.’ It's a credit I think I deserved."

Rudolph called the movie:

Basically an anti–love story. Mortal Thoughts is very violent on one level because it’s about what our society has really done to married couples. We have this attitude of “I love you, I love you, I love you, so let’s get married and then we won’t have to deal with it anymore.” So the movie is a love story about people who hate each other, and it’s disguised as a kind of thriller.

During the shoot, Ghost and Die Hard 2 came out starring Moore and Willis respectively. According to Rudolph, "so instead of a little six million dollar movie, which we were making, suddenly it was Hollywood’s hottest couple."" He said the head of the studio wanted to reshoot most of the movie to make it a romance between the pair. Rudolph refused and said "Demi stood by it."

== Release ==
Mortal Thoughts was originally scheduled to be released in North America in December 1990, but the release was put on hold. At the time, the production company, Polar Entertainment, had filed a lawsuit against New Visions Pictures for a breach of contract regarding Kerven's replacement, though it is unknown if this was the cause of the release delay. The film opened in the spring, on April 19, 1991.

=== Box office ===
The film opened at number 2 at the U.S. box office behind Out for Justice, and earned over $6 million during its opening weekend playing in 963 theaters. Its release expanded the following weekend to 1,196 theaters. It went on to gross a total of $18,784,957 in the United States alone.

=== Critical response ===
The film holds a 56% rating on Rotten Tomatoes, based on 16 reviews. Audiences polled by CinemaScore gave the film an average grade of "C" on an A+ to F scale.

Critic Jonathan Rosenbaum of the Chicago Reader wrote that the film's plot "depends on various delayed revelations and surprises, the last of which, while it violates our faith in the narrative as a whole, doesn’t substantially alter our overall sense of the characters," adding that composer Mark Isham's score "makes the possibility of loving these characters or feeling morally committed to them not only impractical but unthinkable." Roger Ebert of the Chicago Sun-Times praised the film, writing: "Like many crimes, the ones in this movie seem simple at first and only grow complicated the more you look at them. The screenplay, by William Reilly and Claude Kerven, is meticulously constructed so that the flashbacks during the testimony never reveal too much, and yet never seem to conceal anything. Nor is the screenplay simply ingenious; it is also very funny, in a mordant and blood-soaked way, as these two women scheme and figure and lie to the cops, to each other and to themselves. There is a banality to their language and images that sets the correct tone." Sherry Crawford of the Evansville Courier and Press noted Rudolph's "stylized" direction, and deemed the film "a sometimes shocking, sometimes frighteningly honest look at some of our innermost feelings."

Gary Thompson of the Philadelphia Daily News gave the film an unfavorable review, writing that nothing "is enough to make Mortal Thoughts something special. In the end, you sense that the artsy Rudolph never develops a rapport with these shopping-mall women. It's as though they're being punished not for murder, but for bad taste." Marc Horton of the Edmonton Journal gave the film a middling review but praised Moore and Headley's lead performances, writing that "it is the work of these two which gives the movie whatever punch it possesses, even though they have to overcome the director's penchant for pointless eccentricity." Janet Maslin of The New York Times similarly praised the cast, but felt the screenplay lacked momentum, writing: "Although this has all the ingredients of a dark and enjoyably sordid story, and indeed starts out as one, Mr. Rudolph's version of film noir turns out to be more like film gris. Much of it takes place in a gray area between wit and malice, and in the realm of endless, sometimes improvised small talk that winds up seeming genuinely small."

=== Accolades ===
Award	Category	Nominee	Result	Ref.
Chicago Film Critics Association Awards	Best Supporting Actress	Glenne Headly	Nominated	
National Society of Film Critics Awards	Best Supporting Actor	Harvey Keitel	Won	

=== Home media ===
RCA/Columbia Home Video released Mortal Thoughts on VHS and LaserDisc in November 1991. Columbia TriStar Home Video later released it on DVD on August 25, 1998, in a standard full frame presentation.

The Australian company Imprint Films released the film for the first time on Blu-ray in May 2022 as part of their limited edition After Dark: Neo Noir Cinema Collection, which also includes After Dark, My Sweet (1990), Rush (1991), One False Move (1992), Flesh and Bone (1993), and Twilight (1998).
