= Year of the Gun (film) =

1991 film by John Frankenheimer

- Directed by: John Frankenheimer
- Written by: David Ambrose
- Produced by: Edward R. Pressman
- Starring: Andrew McCarthy; Valeria Golino; Sharon Stone; John Pankow
- Cinematography: Blasco Giurato
- Edited by: Lee Percy
- Music by: Bill Conti; Robert J. Walsh
- Distributed by: Triumph Releasing Corporation
- Release date: November 1, 1991
- Running time: 111 minutes
- Country: United States
- Language: English
- Budget: $15 million
- Box office: $1.1 million

Year of the Gun is a 1991 American spy action thriller film directed by John Frankenheimer and starring Andrew McCarthy, Sharon Stone and Valeria Golino.

== Plot ==
In 1978, David Raybourne is an American novelist who lives in Rome and works as a journalist in a small English-language newspaper. He is romantically involved with Lia, the estranged wife of an Italian Industrialist, and befriended by Italo Bianchi, a politically left-leaning lecturer at a Rome university.

The story happens against the backdrop of politically charged atmosphere and student unrest, in which the infamous Red Brigades commit their spate of violent attacks which rocked northern Italy in the 1970s, culminating in the kidnapping and later murder of Aldo Moro, former Italian Prime Minister.

As part of a plan to write a commercial novel and raise money to marry and support Lia in the style to which she is accustomed, Raybourne researches the activities and organization of the Red Brigades. He writes the draft of a novel, realistic but fictitious, with the plot centered on the kidnapping of a central political figure by the Red Brigades. During this time Raybourne meets a beautiful and sexually provocative young photojournalist, Alison King. She is eager for a news story and is introduced by Raybourne to Bianchi. Alison becomes convinced that Raybourne knows something about the Red Brigades and is hiding a potential scoop from her, so after a sexual dalliance she searches his apartment and finds Raybourne's novel draft. She brings this to the attention of Bianchi who, despite his mild manner and seemingly moderate politics, is actually collaborating with the Red Brigades. He delivers the draft to a Red Brigades contact and the similarity of his fictitious plot to their actual kidnap plans causes them to conclude that their plans have been leaked. Raybourne realizes he is being hunted when the Brigades shoot his boss Pierre Bernier dead at the newspaper office, moments before Raybourne himself arrives. He then attempts to escape with Alison with the aid of Lia.

It turns out that Lia is even more deeply involved with the Red Brigades than Bianchi, and after a chase, Raybourne and Alison are captured. They are held while the kidnapping of Aldo Moro takes place. After this is achieved, the Brigades leadership accuses Lia of the leak and shoots her for her apparent betrayal right before Raybourne's and Alison's eyes. They force Alison to photograph the body and instruct Raybourne to publicize the story as a warning to any future traitors.

Raybourne is interviewed on American television regarding the successful publication of a now non-fiction book about the Red Brigades and his contact with them, with a postscript saying that Moro was found shot to death in the trunk of a car nearly two months after his kidnapping.

== Cast ==
- Andrew McCarthy as David Raybourne
- Sharon Stone as Alison King
- Valeria Golino as Lia
- John Pankow as Italo Bianchi
- George Murcell as Pierre Bernier
- Mattia Sbragia as Giovanni
- Roberto Posse as Lucio
- Thomas Elliot as Marco
- Lou Castel as Lou
- Francesca Prandi as Adriana Faranda

== Production ==
Giacomo Pezzali purchased the rights to Michael Mewshaw's novel Year of the Gun in 1983 and hired Carlo Lizzani to direct. However, the next year Edward R. Pressman optioned the novel and hired screenwriter Barrie Keeffe and director Jean-Jacques Beineix in what was to be Beineix's English-language debut. He formed a partnership with Eric Fellner to produce the film at the 1988 Cannes Film Festival. Keeffe and Beineix were replaced with David Ambrose and John Frankenheimer in 1990.

Production was scheduled to begin on April 17, 1990, but was delayed to the summer after the film's Japanese investors only provided a fraction of the costs promised. Production was delayed again to October 8 after the United States dollar lost value in its exchange rate with the Italian lira, the currency the producers intended to finance two-thirds of the project with, and led to a budget deficit. As a result, Frankenheimer had to time the scenes carefully and take careful to shoot as little extra footage as possible in order to cut costs. As a result, the film completed principal photography eight days ahead of schedule. It was mostly shot in Rome and Cinecittà Studios. Frankenheimer wanted to shoot the film in black-and-white but was overruled in order to attract younger audiences and raise home video sales.

== Reception ==
The film received mixed reviews. The New York Times film critic Janet Maslin, criticized the transition from book to film by saying, "But the plot, from a screenplay by David Ambrose based on Michael Mewshaw's book, turns out to be dizzyingly overcomplicated, and far too much of it hinges on the American journalist's supposed power to make trouble with his novel, which he says will be a "Day of the Jackal"-like mixture of real and fictitious characters. It is this journalist's advance knowledge of the plot to kidnap Aldo Moro, a former Italian Prime Minister, that makes so many waves."

Siskel and Ebert were divided, Siskel giving the film a thumbs-down, Ebert a thumbs-up. In his review for the Chicago Sun-Times Ebert gave it 3 out of 4 and wrote: "Frankenheimer's palette is perfectly suited to this material. The grays and browns of his autumn Rome, and the wet skies above it, cast a kind of weary le Carreian gloom over the landscape."

On Rotten Tomatoes the film has an approval rating of 29% based on reviews from 7 critics.
