= Episodes (TV series) =

British-American television sitcom

- Genre: Sitcom
- Created by: David Crane; Jeffrey Klarik
- Written by: David Crane; Jeffrey Klarik
- Directed by: James Griffiths; Jim Field Smith; Iain B. MacDonald; Jeffrey Klarik
- Starring: Matt LeBlanc; Stephen Mangan; Tamsin Greig; John Pankow; Kathleen Rose Perkins; Mircea Monroe
- Music by: Mark Thomas
- Countries of origin: United Kingdom; United States
- Original language: English
- No. of seasons: 5
- No. of episodes: 41 (list of episodes)

Production
- Executive producers: David Crane; Jeffrey Klarik; Jimmy Mulville
- Production locations: Hollywood; Windlesham
- Cinematography: Rob Kitzmann
- Editor: Nigel Williams
- Camera setup: Single-camera
- Running time: 27 minutes
- Production companies: Hat Trick Productions; Crane/Klarik Productions; Showtime Networks

Original release
- Network: BBC Two (UK); Showtime (US)
- Release: 9 January 2011 – 8 October 2017

Episodes is a television sitcom created by David Crane and Jeffrey Klarik and produced by Hat Trick Productions. It premiered on Showtime in the United States on 9 January 2011 and on BBC Two in the United Kingdom on 10 January 2011. The show is about a British husband-and-wife comedy writing team who travel to Hollywood to remake their successful British TV series, with unexpected results. It stars Matt LeBlanc portraying a satirical version of himself. LeBlanc made his regular return to television for the first time since he was on NBC's Joey.

On 10 June 2015, it was announced that Showtime had renewed Episodes for a fifth season, which was due to begin filming in London in 2016. On 11 April 2016, the fifth season was confirmed to be the series' last; it consists of seven episodes and premiered on 20 August 2017. The series finale, "Episode Seven", aired on 8 October 2017.

Episodes has received positive reviews from critics, with specific praise being given to the performances of stars Stephen Mangan, Tamsin Greig, and LeBlanc. For his performance in the series, LeBlanc won a Golden Globe Award for Best Actor – Television Series Musical or Comedy and has been nominated for four Primetime Emmy Awards.

== Episodes ==
Season	Episodes	Originally released	
Season	Episodes	First released	Last released
1	7	January 9, 2011	February 20, 2011
2	9	May 11, 2012	July 6, 2012
3	9	January 12, 2014	March 16, 2014
4	9	January 11, 2015	March 15, 2015
5	7	August 20, 2017	October 8, 2017

Sean (Stephen Mangan) and Beverly (Tamsin Greig) Lincoln win yet another BAFTA Award for their successful British sitcom, Lyman's Boys. Network president Merc Lapidus (John Pankow) and his second-in-command/paramour Carol Rance (Kathleen Rose Perkins) convince the couple to move to Los Angeles to remake their series for an American audience. The network immediately pressures the Lincolns into casting Matt LeBlanc for the lead role; Matt charms the Lincolns but they still insist he's wrong for the part. The network also changes the premise of the show to an unrecognizable degree, going from a sophisticated comedy about a headmaster at a boarding school to a slapstick comedy about a hockey coach called Pucks!. Hollywood veteran Morning Randolph (Mircea Monroe) is also cast in a main role.

During production of the pilot, Sean becomes good friends with Matt. However, tensions flare between Matt and Beverly when he suggests that Morning's character be straight rather than a lesbian—a move Sean ultimately supports in order for the story to have room to grow. Beverly begins suspecting that Sean has feelings for Morning although he denies this. During a gala, Matt tries to set Sean up with Morning but this ultimately fails. Beverly catches Sean masturbating to Morning's sex tape and becomes incensed when she misinterprets a hug between him and Morning. Beverly begins packing to go home and leaves Sean but accidentally gets into a car accident, smashing into Matt's car. After recuperating at his house, Matt and Beverly have sex. Afterwards, Matt reveals that nothing ever happened between Sean and Morning. Horrified, Beverly returns home to Sean and apologizes for freaking out. Production on the Pucks! pilot ends and Sean and Beverly prepare to return home to London. At Matt's house, Sean finds out about his sex with Beverly and the two fight. Sean tells Beverly that he's going to divorce her when they return home. However, test audiences loved Pucks! and a full season has been ordered.

Months later, Sean and Beverly are still working together on the show, with their relationship remaining purely professional. Matt and Sean are able to work through their differences. Meanwhile, Pucks! premieres and is panned by critics, but the first episode earns strong ratings. During the airing of the episode, Matt receives a handjob from Merc's blind wife Jamie (Genevieve O'Reilly) and begins an affair with her. The ratings for Pucks! decline sharply after its second episode. Citing audience surveys, the network suggests that Sean and Beverly rework the scripts to focus less on Matt and more on his teenage co-stars. Matt is furious and threatens to quit but relents when Beverly tells him that the show is the only thing giving her a chance at reuniting with Sean. When Sean insists that he has no interest in doing so, Beverly begins dating Morning's brother Rob (James Purefoy). Meanwhile, Carol is told by network chairman Elliot Salad (Michael Brandon) that Merc will soon be fired. Carol wants to preserve her romantic relationship with Merc so she tells him that his blind wife is having an affair with Matt, leading to fisticuffs between the two men. Afterward, Carol tells Merc that he's out of his job. She breaks up with him after he tells her he can't leave his wife now. Beverly, who was injured in the fight, shares a moment with Sean and the two finally reunite.

The unstable Castor Sotto (Chris Diamantopoulos) is chosen to replace Merc and insists on cancelling Pucks!. Carol defends the show and suggests moving it to a new night. Meanwhile, Matt falls in love with a script for an NBC drama pilot. He begs Sean and Beverly to kill him off the show, but they refuse once they discover that the script is penned by their obnoxious former assistant Andrew Lesley (Oliver Kieran-Jones). After the ratings plummet in their new timeslot, Pucks! is pulled from the schedule and production on the show begins to wind down. As Matt negotiates for a role in the NBC pilot, Sean and Beverly begin preparing to return home when an agent, Eileen Jaffee (Andrea Rosen), remembers an old script of theirs titled The Opposite of Us. Eileen convinces a tepid Sean to let her shop the script at several networks, but Beverly is dead-set on returning home. With her job on the line, Carol shows the script to Castor and he wants to adapt it. Although Sean is unsure as to what to do, Beverly convinces him to ignore their offers as she insists it would be the same experience they had with Pucks!. The Lincolns return home to London and Matt is cast in the NBC pilot. Meanwhile, after Merc informs Elliot about Matt's NBC deal, Pucks! is picked up for an additional six episodes, ending Matt's stint on the pilot and forcing the Lincolns to return to California.

As production on Pucks! is forced to continue, Castor Sotto is fired and replaced by Helen Basch (Andrea Savage). The new charismatic network president is able to convince Sean and Beverly to let them make The Opposite of Us. Sean receives a visit from his old writing partner Tim Whittick (Bruce Mackinnon) who suggests that he was a co-author of the original script. Tim wants to be involved in production of the new show, but Sean and Beverly strongly oppose this. After legal problems present themselves, Sean gives the network an ultimatum that he and Beverly will walk if Tim is involved and the network relents to their demands. Meanwhile, Matt incurs tremendous financial losses after his accountant is exposed for embezzling his clients. In an act of desperation, he and Merc collaborate on a game show called The Box. At the network, Carol gets along well with Helen and the two begin a relationship. However, Helen believes that Beverly is attracted to Carol. After suspecting that she's being cheated on, Helen fires Carol and forces Sean and Beverly to work on The Opposite of Us with Tim serving as showrunner.

The Box is an enormous success. However, Matt is accidentally caught on tape masturbating on set and he is subsequently fired. Ratings for the show tank without him and Matt only agrees to return if the network agrees to his stipulations, including a guarantee series order for a script he chooses. He asks Sean and Beverly to pen the new script; with the production on Opposite of Us becoming increasingly unbearable, they gleefully quit and agree to work with Matt on a new show. After throwing around several ideas, the passing of Matt's father (Alex Rocco) inspires them to write a drama about a conflicted father-son relationship. Meanwhile, Carol threatens the network with a sexual harassment lawsuit. After briefly rekindling her relationship with Merc, she discovers she's pregnant, although she leaves him when she learns he's also involved with Morning. Helen and Carol ultimately get back together. Sean, Beverly, and Matt pitch their show to the network and it is green-lit. However, Matt ultimately passes when he reads the script, incensing the Lincolns. Sean and Beverly begin developing a new script. Matt apologizes and begs to be cast in the show, as he insists the main role was made for him. Months later, the ensemble gather to watch the premiere of their new show: Episodes.

== Cast and characters ==
=== Main ===
- Matt LeBlanc as a fictionalized version of himself. Matt is a wealthy, charming, but arrogant actor, who was persuaded by the high salary to take the starring role of Coach Lyman in Pucks. He has a short attention span and need for immediate gratification. He has two sons, who spend most of their time with their mother Diane (Fiona Glascott), with whom Matt has an antagonistic yet ultimately protective relationship.
- Stephen Mangan as Sean Lincoln – co-creator of Pucks. Sean moves from London to Hollywood with his wife and co-creator Beverly to adapt their award-winning show Lyman's Boys for American audiences. Sean initially adapts to Hollywood better than Beverly, finding it easier to bond with Matt on some level than she does. Although he grows to loathe Hollywood and professes to want to return home, Sean stays because the paychecks are much bigger.
- Tamsin Greig as Beverly Lincoln – co-creator of Pucks. When Beverly and Sean move to Hollywood, she is quickly overwhelmed by the new lifestyle. Unlike Sean, Beverly struggles to adjust to life in Los Angeles, and the only person she feels close to is network executive Carol Rance (Kathleen Rose Perkins), with whom she often goes hiking in Griffith Park and smokes pot.
- John Pankow as Merc Lapidus – the president of the network. He purchases the American rights to Lyman's Boys without watching it, based on the acclaim it has received, but immediately insists on major changes which ultimately have a significant impact on the quality of the show. He is boorish and arrogant, lies to everybody to avoid responsibility and has a very short attention span. He is cheating on his blind wife with his network subordinate, Carol.
- Kathleen Rose Perkins as Carol Rance – the network's head of programming. She is Merc's second-in-command. Carol is very good at her job, but she often undermines herself professionally because she has a fetish for people who have authority over her, leading her to engage in a series of affairs with her bosses. She becomes good friends with Beverly.
- Mircea Monroe as Morning Randolph – the leading actress employed by the network to play librarian Nicola McCutcheon opposite Matt's character on Pucks. A running gag throughout the show is that Morning's age, while never explicitly revealed, is significantly older than her appearance suggests. She has frequent plastic surgery to maintain the appearance of youth which she feels Hollywood insists on from actresses. Morning perceives herself as a household name equal to Matt because she was "Kelly" on the show Kelly Girl many years before. She has a 19-year-old daughter, Dawn, who she pretends is her younger sister.

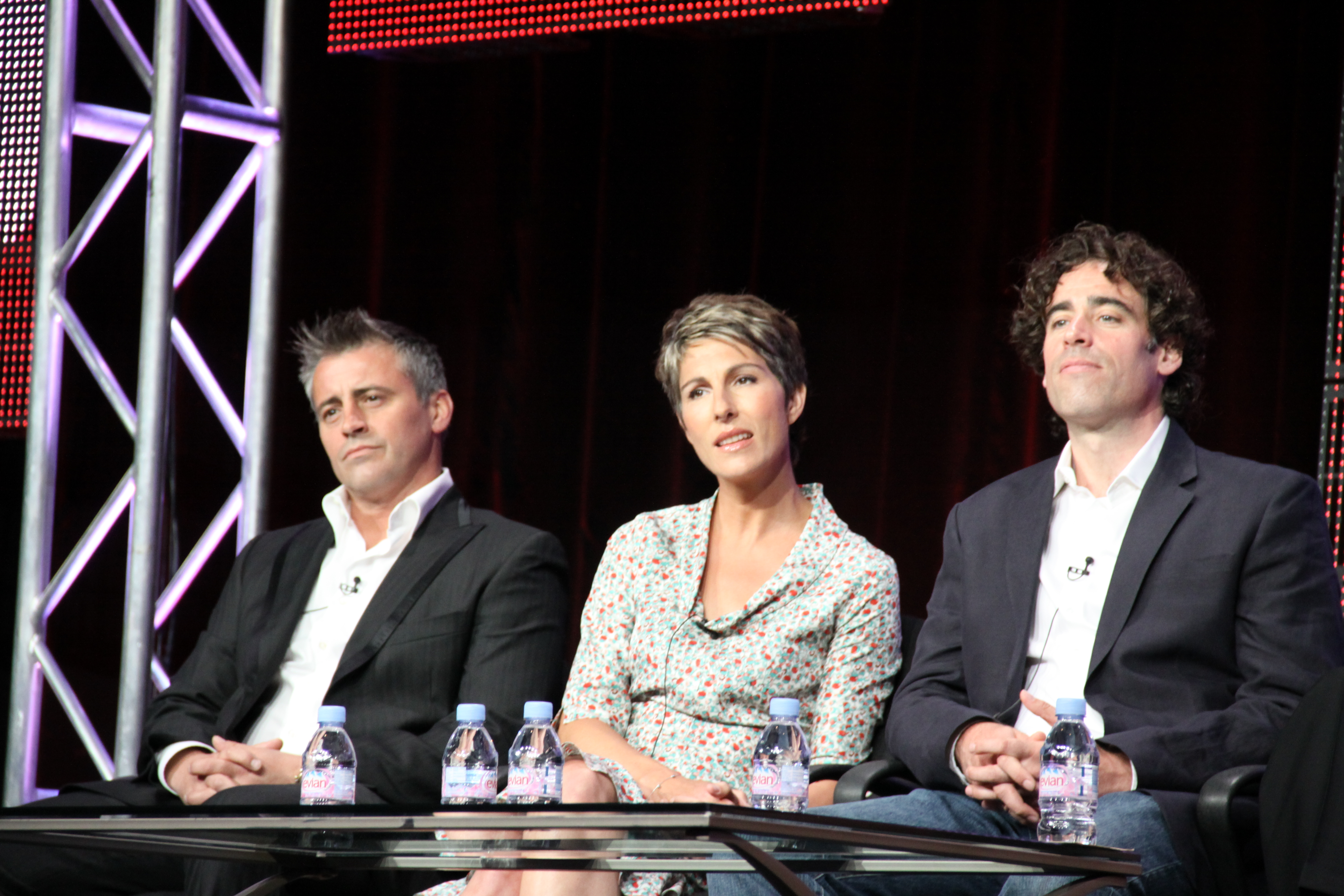
Episodes cast TCA 2010

=== Recurring ===
- Joseph May as Andy Button (seasons 1–5) – the head of casting of the network. By the end of the first season, he is fired by Merc because he likes the talking dog show Merc hates. In the second season, he is re-hired when he threatens a lawsuit against the network.
- Daisy Haggard as Myra Licht (seasons 1–5) – the head of comedy of the network. She constantly makes negative facial expressions and utters disapproving noises. In the fourth season, she obliviously becomes pregnant and ultimately gives birth.
- Genevieve O'Reilly as Jamie Lapidus (seasons 1–3) – Merc's third wife who is blind, but can surprisingly get around. She is aware of Merc's affair with Carol and eventually leaves him for Matt.
- Sophie Rundle as Labia (seasons 2–3) – Matt's stalker who has been stalking Matt for 15 years. She was a Make-A-Wish child whose wish had Matt take her to Disneyland, but she survives cancer and starts stalking him, leading to him getting a restraining order against her. Nevertheless, he has slept with her more than once. She subsequently outgrows Matt in the third season.
- Fiona Glascott as Diane (seasons 1–5) – Matt's ex-wife who is often angry at Matt, but still feels some affection for him. She is understandably protective of their two sons due to Matt's poor life choices.
- Michael Brandon as Elliot Salad (seasons 2–5) – the chairman of the network.
- Chris Diamantopoulos as Castor Sotto (seasons 3–4) – Merc's replacement as network executive. Castor has significant psychological issues and bold ideas for changes at the network.
- Andrea Savage as Helen Basch (seasons 4–5) – Castor's replacement as network executive. Helen is a lesbian who demonstrates good instincts about creative ideas, but is prone to jealousy.
- Alex Rocco as Dick LeBlanc (seasons 3–4) – Matt's father from whom he is estranged, although he supports him financially.
- Caroline Aaron as Linda (seasons 3–5) – Dick's crotchety girlfriend who takes care of and lives with him. She keeps Matt in the loop about his father, although she and Matt don't really get along well.
- Rhoda Gemignani as Mrs. LeBlanc (seasons 4–5) – Matt's almost-deaf mother who requires hearing aids in order to hear better.
- Oliver Kieran-Jones as Andrew Lesley (seasons 1–4) – Sean and Beverly's former personal assistant who becomes smug towards them due to his rapid rise in show business.
- Bruce Mackinnon as Tim Whittick (seasons 4–5) – Sean's former writing partner, with whom he stopped writing after beginning a creative and romantic relationship with Beverly. According to Beverly, Tim refers to her as Yoko Ono by somehow adding the phrase "oh no" into their conversations.
- Nigel Planer as Sanford Shamiro (seasons 2–4) – Matt's lawyer. He always handles the ramifications of Matt's actions and tends to be very frustrated with Matt as a result.
- Roger Bart as Roger Riskin (seasons 3–5) – Matt's agent, who generally pitches him ideas that are high-paying but humiliating. [NOTE: William Hope was Matt's agent in Seasons 1.]
- Andrea Rosen as Eileen Jaffee (seasons 3–5) – an agent at William Morris Endeavor who takes in Sean and Beverly as her clients. She always goes out of her way to act on Sean and Beverly's projects without their consent.
- Ella Kenion as Beth (seasons 3–5) – Matt's publicist. She handles Matt's public statements whenever news of Matt's controversial actions break out.
- Geoff McGivern as Bob (season 4) – Matt's finance manager. He gives Matt woes whenever he calls him, with Matt knowing that it usually involves his money, yielding the two words the latter dreads the most, "It's Bob."
- James Purefoy as Rob (season 2) – Morning's younger brother, who briefly dates Beverly.
- Scarlett Rose Patterson as Wendy (seasons 2–4) – Sean and Beverly's monotonous personal assistant. She never concentrates on her work and often tries to leave early.
- Sam Palladio as Stoke Stamon (seasons 2–4) – a 31-year old actor who plays the ice hockey team player Howie in Pucks! He does well in Hollywood because he is the one "with the hair".
- Harry McEntire as Jason Julius (seasons 2–3) – a 27-year old actor who plays the ice hockey team player Max in Pucks! In the second season, he reveals to Sean and Beverly that he, Stoke and Kevin are much older than they look and that he has married and divorced multiple times.
- Jacob Anderson as Kevin Garillo (season 2) – a 29-year old actor who plays the ice hockey team player Kyle in Pucks! His character in the show has two gay fathers. [NOTE: Eros Vlahos' character in Season 1, "Pucks! Boy", also has two gay fathers like Kevin, making it unclear whether or not both actors played the same character in Pucks!.]
- Rufus Jones as Anthony Powner Smith (seasons 3 & 5) – a British actor who initially replaces Matt in Andrew's NBC pilot but gets temporarily paralysed after a kickboxing accident.
- Lou Hirsch as Wallace (season 1) – the security guard at the gates of the Beverly Hills estates where Sean and Beverly live in the first season. He never remembers the two and often gives them trouble in letting them inside the gates. Fed up with his memory loss for a third time, Beverly succeeds in making a profanity-laced demand for him to open the gate.

== Development and production ==
In May 2010, the BBC announced that seven episodes had been ordered and that filming had begun, with James Griffiths directing. Sean and Beverly Lincoln were played by Stephen Mangan and Tamsin Greig, who previously co-starred in the British sitcom Green Wing (2004–2007).

Beverly was originally to be portrayed by Claire Forlani, but she left the cast in April 2010 when the series was in pre-production. LeBlanc was to play a "larger than life version of himself" as character Matt LeBlanc. Thomas Haden Church was also to have a role in the series as Merc Lapidus, the American television executive who commissions the remake, but he left due to scheduling conflicts, and was replaced by John Pankow.

Although the majority of the show was set in Los Angeles, the first season was mainly filmed in the UK, including the 103-room mansion Updown Court that Sean and Beverly Lincoln briefly stayed in. Inserts were shot on location in LA. LeBlanc's Malibu mansion was also UK-based. Seasons 2–5 were shot primarily in Los Angeles.

== Reception ==
The response of American critics was positive. Robert Bianco of USA Today called the show "easily the best new sitcom of the season" and The Boston Globe's Matthew Gilbert said that "Each of the season's seven half-hours is a little sliver of pleasure." A Boston Herald review by Mark A. Perigard was lukewarm; he said he feared that the show would never achieve a broad audience, and David Wiegand from the San Francisco Chronicle praised the performances of the actors but felt that the series simply was not funny. Alan Sepinwall of HitFix went further declaring the show to be one of the worst TV moments of 2011. The UK critics' response to the first episode was broadly lukewarm while remaining optimistic. More screentime for Matt LeBlanc was eagerly anticipated by some, with The Independent's Brian Viner believing that this might improve the series.

The second season received positive reviews from critics. Henry Goldblatt of Entertainment Weekly called the second season "a terrific second season of this industry-set sitcom." USA Today said of the show: "As smartly written as it is played, Episodes offers the comic pleasures, not just of clashing cultures, but of contrasting comic styles. On one side you have LeBlanc, who handles the big laughs and the broader humor, and does it so well, it serves as a reminder that he was under-appreciated during his years on Friends." Ed Bark of Uncle Barky praised the season saying it was "a thoroughly entertaining romp, with the television industry as a combination Tilt-A-Whirl/merry-go-round." On the Firewall & Iceberg podcast Alan Sepinwall and Dan Fienberg commented on the second season, saying that the "self-congratulatory, obvious" show that is "oddly tone-deaf about the business that it was trying to satirize" is "not about anything" and "as a result is better for it," but is still "groaningly unfunny".

The third season received mixed reviews from critics. Emily Nussbaum of The New Yorker gave the season a positive review, saying "It seemed doubtful that the show's creators could keep those plates spinning for another round, but the third season introduces a fantastic new contrivance: a psychotic new network head, played by Chris Diamantopoulos." Brian Lowry of Variety gave the season a lukewarm review, praising Matt LeBlanc's performance, writing: "Episodes remains distinguished, mostly, by Matt LeBlanc's gameness in playing a jaundiced, utterly self-absorbed version of himself, the classic stereotype of a sitcom star with an oversized ego.". Phil Dyess-Nugent of The A.V. Club gave the season a "C+" grade and a mixed review, writing: "It's turned out to be a fairly tired satire of Hollywood, one that's stayed yoked to its dubious premise."

In the UK, episode one of the series premiered with an audience of 1.86 million, an audience share of 8.5%. Episode Two received 1.53 million viewers (7.4%) – and by Episode Four, viewing numbers were down to 1.09 million (5.3%). Episode Five saw a slight rise in viewers to 1.33 million (6.6%), but numbers once again fell for Episode Six to 1.12 million (5.5%) and the season ended with the lowest number of viewers, 1.06 million (5.1%), tuning in for the final episode. The second series in the UK began with 1.34 million, audience share of 6.8%, but by episode seven had steadily declined to 0.68 million viewers and an audience share of 3.3%. As in the US, the UK's reception to the second series was positive with The Arts Desk saying "There were some very funny industry-related gags, not least network boss Merc (John Pankow) and his PA-cum-mistress Carol (Kathleen Rose Perkins) having sex on his desk while roaring the ratings figures back at one another. The cast are excellent value but at the moment only Greig seems to be playing for genuine emotional stakes. Portraying an exaggerated version of his on-screen persona, LeBlanc's sweet, sex-obsessed shallowness is all that's required, but Mangan – a terrific comic actor – seems constantly to be toying with a smirk, devaluing some of the emotional currency you sense Episodes is striving for. Together, they've proved they can make us laugh."

== Broadcast ==
The series premiered in Australia on Nine on 3 July 2012, with the second season returning on 4 September 2012. The first two seasons were replayed by subscription television network BBC UKTV (as opposed to Nine which is a free-to-air network), premiering 28 January 2014. Unlike the first two seasons which premiered in Australia on Nine, the third season premiered on pay TV. Although originally set to air on BBC UKTV, the series premiered on BBC First on 12 September 2014, and returned for season four on 7 September 2015. On 14 November 2016, it was reported that the fifth and final season would have its premiere on streaming provider Stan in 2017. This move is believed to be the result of BBC no longer being a co-producer of the series and that Stan has an output agreement with Showtime.

== Awards and nominations ==
Awards and nominations for Episodes
Year	Association	Category	Recipients	Result
2011	Primetime Emmy Award	Outstanding Lead Actor in a Comedy Series	Matt LeBlanc (Episode: "The Fight")	Nominated
2011	Primetime Emmy Award	Outstanding Writing for a Comedy Series	David Crane & Jeffrey Klarik (Episode: "The Fight")	Nominated
2011	Primetime Emmy Award	Outstanding Main Title Theme Music	Mark Thomas	Nominated
2011	Satellite Award	Best Actor – Television Series Musical or Comedy	Matt LeBlanc	Nominated
2011	Satellite Award	Best Television Series – Musical or Comedy		Nominated
2012	Golden Globe Award	Best Actor – Television Series Musical or Comedy	Matt LeBlanc	Won
2012	Golden Globe Award	Best Television Series – Musical or Comedy		Nominated
2012	Writers Guild of America Award	Television: New Series	David Crane & Jeffrey Klarik	Nominated
2013	BAFTA Award	Best Situation Comedy	David Crane, Jeffrey Klarik & Jimmy Mulville	Nominated
2013	Golden Globe Award	Best Actor – Television Series Musical or Comedy	Matt LeBlanc	Nominated
2013	Golden Globe Award	Best Television Series – Musical or Comedy		Nominated
2013	Primetime Emmy Award	Outstanding Lead Actor in a Comedy Series	Matt LeBlanc (Episode: "The Affair")	Nominated
2013	Primetime Emmy Award	Outstanding Writing for a Comedy Series	David Crane & Jeffrey Klarik (Episode: "The Award")	Nominated
2013	Writers Guild of America Award	Television: Episodic Comedy	David Crane & Jeffrey Klarik (For "The Award")	Nominated
2014	Primetime Emmy Award	Outstanding Lead Actor in a Comedy Series	Matt LeBlanc (Episode: "Episode Six")	Nominated
2014	Primetime Emmy Award	Outstanding Writing for a Comedy Series	David Crane & Jeffrey Klarik (Episode: "Episode Five")	Nominated
2014	Primetime Emmy Award	Outstanding Directing for a Comedy Series	Iain B. MacDonald (Episode: "Episode Nine")	Nominated
2015	Primetime Emmy Award	Outstanding Lead Actor in a Comedy Series	Matt LeBlanc (Episode: "Episode Five")	Nominated
2015	Primetime Emmy Award	Outstanding Writing for a Comedy Series	David Crane & Jeffrey Klarik (Episode: "Episode Nine")	Nominated
2015	BAFTA Award	Best Female Comedy Performance	Tamsin Greig	Nominated

== Home media ==
The series was released gradually over time onto DVD Region 1 as follows:

DVD name	Ep #	Release date
Episodes: The First Season	7	12 June 2012
Episodes: The First and Second Season	16	8 January 2013
Episodes: The Third Season	9	13 January 2015
Episodes: The Fourth Season	9	5 April 2016
Episodes: The Fifth and Final Season	9	1 November 2018

The entire series has also been made available on DVD Region 2. To date, only Season 1 has additionally been released to Blu-ray.
