= Michael Mewshaw =

American novelist

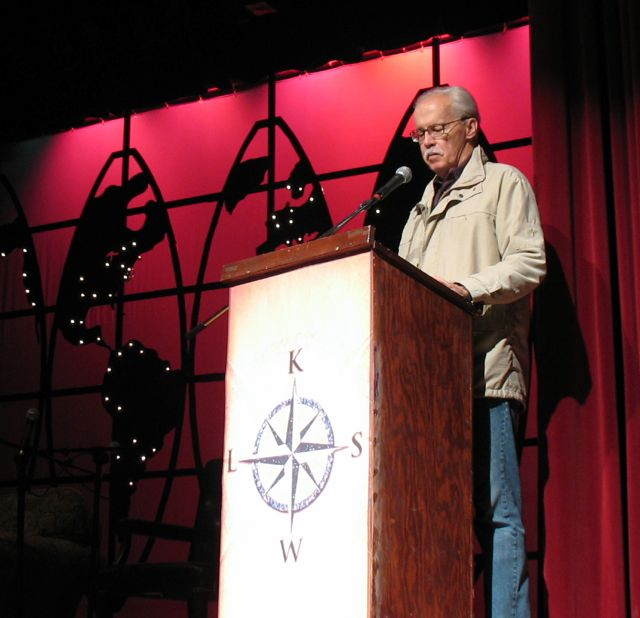
- Reading at the 2006 Key West Literary Seminar
- Born: February 19, 1943 (age 83); Washington, D.C., U.S.
- Education: University of Maryland, College Park; University of Virginia
- Occupations: Novelist; nonfiction writer; journalist
- Writing career
- Genre: Literary fiction Nonfiction
- Notable work: Year of the Gun Short Circuit: Six Months on the Men’s Professional Tennis Tour Ladies of the Court: Grace And Disgrace On The Women's Tennis Tour

Michael Mewshaw (born February 19, 1943) is an American author of 11 novels and 11 books of nonfiction, and works frequently as a travel writer, investigative reporter, book reviewer, and tennis reporter. His novel Year of the Gun was made into a film of the same name by John Frankenheimer in 1991. He is married with two sons.

Alan Cheuse, National Public Radio's longtime "voice of books," called him "the best novelist in America that nobody knows."

== Background ==
=== Early life and education ===
Born in Washington, DC, and raised in the suburb of Prince George's County, Maryland, Mewshaw graduated Phi Beta Kappa from the University of Maryland, College Park (1965), then was granted a four-year fellowship to attend the graduate writing program at the University of Virginia, where he attained his Masters (1966) and Doctorate (1970) degrees under the tutelage of George Garrett. While studying at UVA, Mewshaw completed two unpublished novels, then embarked on a road trip across Mexico with his wife (at the urging of William Styron, who was the subject of his masters thesis and doctoral dissertation); a journey which would form the basis of his first novel Man in Motion (1970), which he completed while on a Fulbright Fellowship in France.

=== Early career ===
Mewshaw taught creative writing at the University of Massachusetts at Amherst, and subsequently was named Director of Creative writing at the University of Texas at Austin. Taking leaves of absence every other year from this post, Mewshaw based himself in Rome, Italy, and continued traveling throughout Europe and North Africa. While Mewshaw researched his third novel The Toll (1974) in Marrakesh, Morocco, his wife Linda was hired as Lindsay Wagner's stand-in on the set of Robert Wise's film Two People. Mewshaw's experience of that shoot was the jumping-off point for his fifth novel Land Without Shadow (1979).

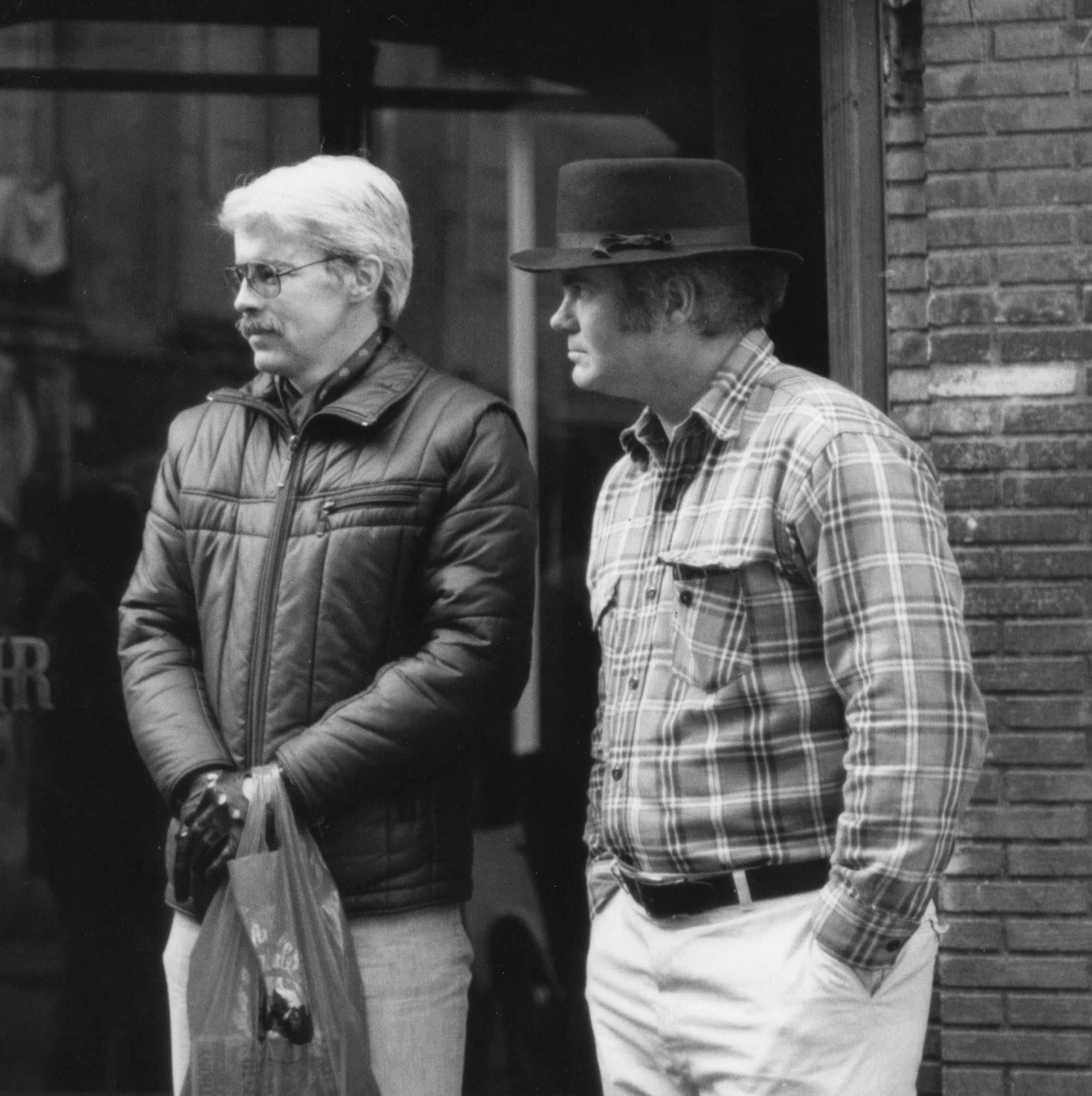
Authors Michael Mewshaw and Pat Conroy, Rome, Italy, circa 1982

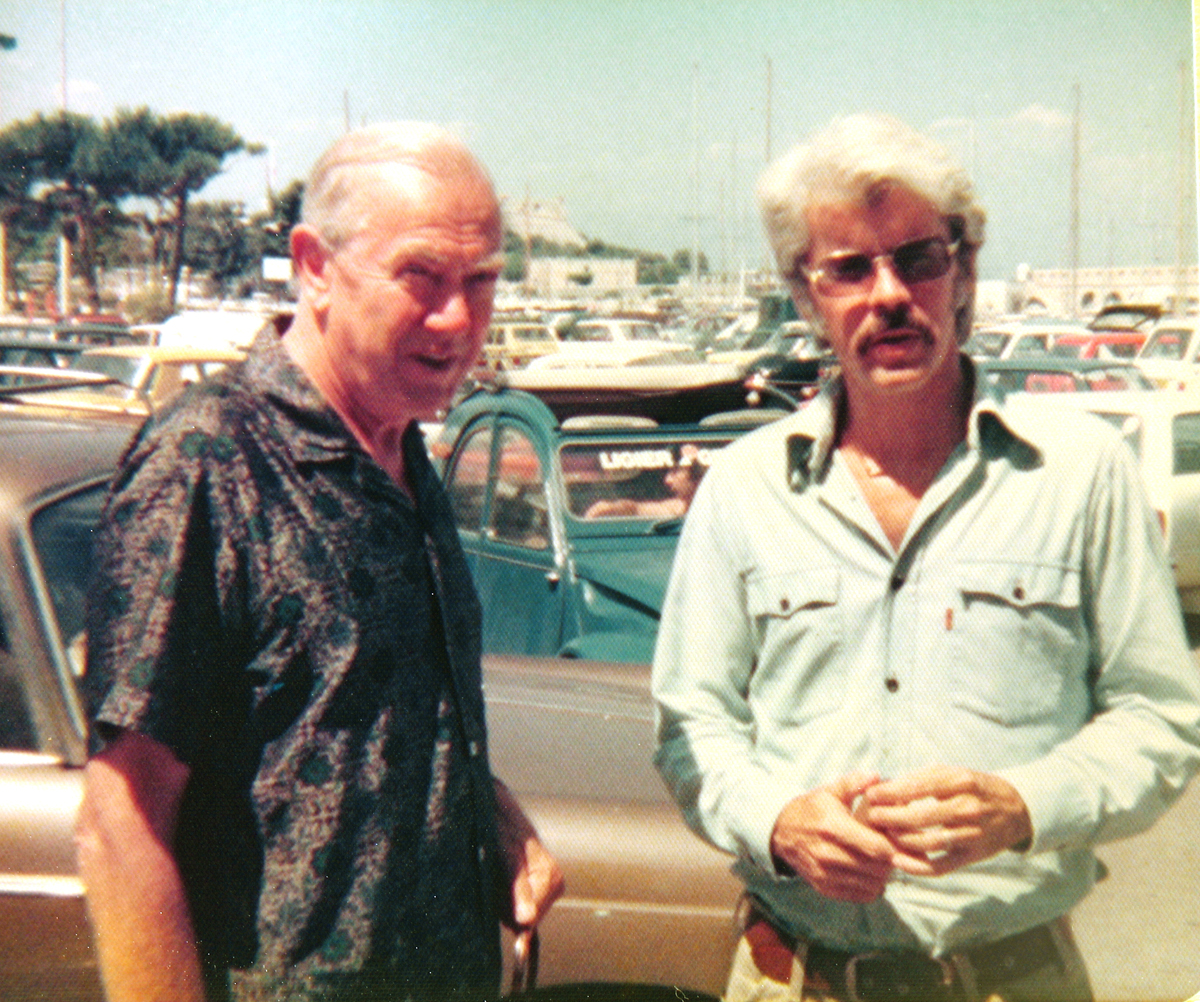
Authors Graham Greene and Michael Mewshaw, outside Chez Felix Restaurant, Antibes, France, Summer 1976

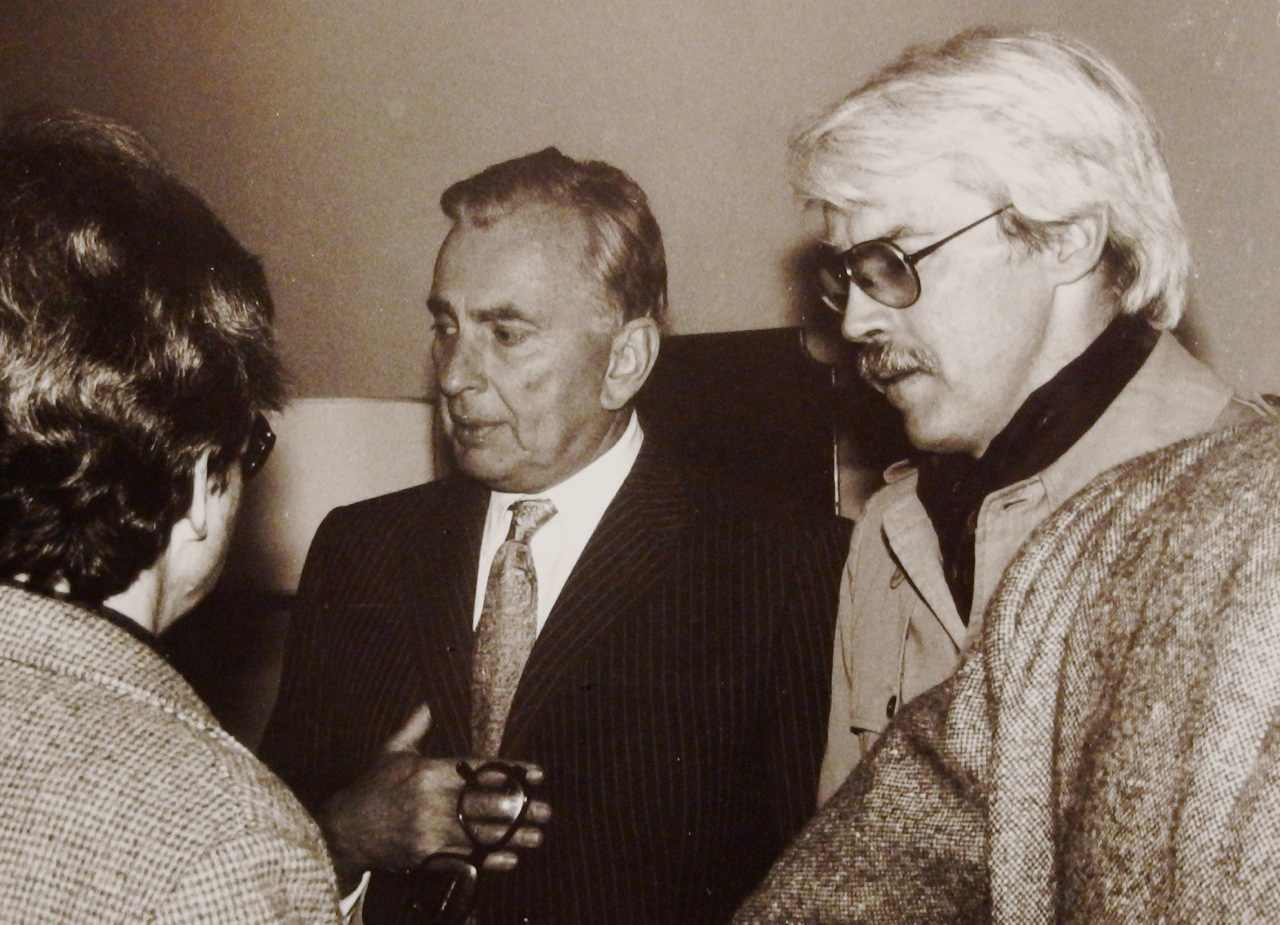
Authors Gore Vidal and Michael Mewshaw, American Academy in Rome, Italy, 1983

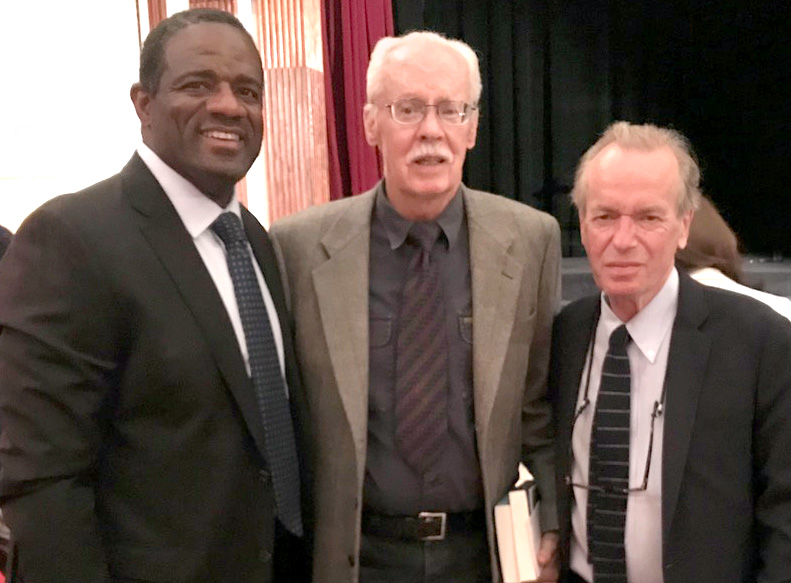
Damon Austin, Michael Mewshaw, and Martin Amis, at the American Library in Paris Gala, 2019

== Bibliography ==
=== Novels ===
- Man in Motion (1970)
- Waking Slow (1972)
- The Toll (1974)
- Earthly Bread (1976)
- Land Without Shadow (1979)
- Year of the Gun (1984)
- Blackballed (1986)
- True Crime (1991)
- Shelter from the Storm (2003)
- Island Tempest (2005)
- Lying with the Dead (2009)

=== Nonfiction ===
- Life for Death (1980)
- Short Circuit: Six Months on the Men's Professional Tennis Tour (1983)
- Money to Burn (1987)
- Playing Away (1988)
- Ladies of the Court: Grace And Disgrace On The Women's Tennis Tour (1993)
- Do I Owe You Something?: A Memoir of the Literary Life (2003)
- If You Could See Me Now: A Chronicle of Identity and Adoption (2006)
- Between Terror and Tourism: An Overland Trip Across North Africa (2010)
- Sympathy for the Devil: Four Decades of Friendship with Gore Vidal (2014)
- Ad In Ad Out: Collected Tennis Articles (2016)
- The Lost Prince: A Search for Pat Conroy (2019)
- My Man in Antibes: Getting to Know Graham Greene (2023)

== Honors ==
- Fulbright Fellow in Creative Writing to France, 1968–69
- William Rainey Prize at Bread Loaf Writers' Conference, 1970
- Wallace Stegner Fellowship, 1971
- National Endowment for the Arts Grant, 1974
- Visiting Artist at American Academy in Rome, 1975–76
- Carr Collins Award for Best Non-Fiction Book of 1980
- Guggenheim Grant, 1981–82
- Visiting Artist, American Academy in Rome, 1980–83
- Carr Collins Award for Best Non-Fiction Book of 1983
- Book of the Year, Tennis Week, 1993
- Runner-up, William Hill Award, Best Sports Book of the Year in England, 1993
- Investigative Journalist of the Year, Tennis Week, 1997
- Independent Bookseller's Award Best Novel of the Year, 2009 - Lying With The Dead
- Longlist, PEN/Jacqueline Bograd Weld Award for Biography, 2020 - The Lost Prince
