= Italian American Reconciliation =

Play written by John Patrick Shanley

Italian American Reconciliation is a play by John Patrick Shanley. It premiered Off-Broadway at the Manhattan Theatre Club in 1988.

== Productions ==
Italian American Reconciliation was first performed at the Eugene O'Neill Theater Center in Waterford, Connecticut, in a staged reading in 1986. It had its New York premiere on October 18, 1988, at the Manhattan Theatre Club starring John Turturro, Andrea Bianchi, Helen Hanft, John Pankow, and Laura San Giacomo and directed by Shanley.

The play, by the author of the critically acclaimed film Moonstruck, is part tall tale and part a slice of New York Americana, Italian style. Frank Rich, reviewing for The New York Times said, "Mr. Shanley's writing recalls Paddy Chayefsky's Marty gone loopily punchdrunk."

In reviewing a production at the Ruskin Group Theatre, Los Angeles, California, in 2009, the reviewer compared the play to Moonstruck, writing: "[it] explores similar themes: gender wars, joys and pains of a tight-knit ethnic community, fear of loneliness. Twenty years on, the play feels like a period piece — cornball, sure, but with a big-heartedness and linguistic vitality that today’s emerging writers could learn from."

The play ran at the Long Wharf Theater, New Haven, Connecticut, in 2011. The New York Times reviewer noted that the story, an "operatic comic romance" is "as emotionally heightened as an expensive, microplanned family celebration and as sad as the morning after."
