= Jeffrey Klarik =

American writer and producer

- Education: Carnegie Mellon University
- Occupations: Director, writer, producer
- Known for: Mad About You; Episodes
- Spouse: David Crane

Jeffrey Klarik is an American television writer and producer. He created the series Half & Half and co-produced the sitcom Mad About You. With his partner David Crane, Klarik co-created the award-winning comedy Episodes and the ensemble sitcom The Class.

== Early life and education ==
Klarik was raised in Connecticut in a Jewish family of Russian descent. His father was a comedy fan and took him to see performers including Schecky Greene, Jackie Mason and Woody Allen in comedy clubs. He graduated from the Carnegie Mellon University College of Fine Arts in 1969.

== Career ==
In the 1990s, Klarik and his partner David Crane both wrote for the HBO series Dream On. Crane went on to serve as the executive producer on Friends, and Klarik has described himself as an "unofficial writer" on that show.

After working on the CBS sitcom Ink, Klarik created the series Half & Half for UPN. Starring Rachel True and Essence Atkins as estranged half-sisters, the show's pilot premiered in 1999, and the series ran from 2002 to 2006. He served as a writer and co-producer on the NBC sitcom Mad About You starring Paul Reiser and Helen Hunt.

Klarik and Crane co-created The Class, which debuted in 2006. Though it was inspired by the popular series Lost and marketed as "the next Friends," the show was cancelled after just 19 episodes. The duo also collaborated on the BBC/Showtime sitcom Episodes, which aired from 2011 to 2017 and featured Friends star Matt LeBlanc as a fictional version of himself working on a series with Stephen Mangan and Tamsin Greig playing the showrunners. The series was nominated 4 times for Outstanding Writing for a Comedy Series at the Primetime Emmy Awards.

In 2017, Klarik and Crane were recognized for their contributions to television at the Nantucket Film Festival.

== Personal life ==
On New Year's Eve 2016, Klarik and Crane eloped after over 30 years of dating; the couple met through mutual friends. They told The Advocate how their experiences as gay men informed their work in a joint 2017 interview.

== Filmography ==
| Year | Title | Notes |
|---|---|---|
| 1990-1996 | Dream On | Writer |
| 1992-1999 | Mad About You | Writer, co-producer |
| 1995-1998 | The Naked Truth | Producer, writer |
| 1996-1997 | Ink | Producer, writer |
| 2001 | Carly (pilot) | Creator, executive producer |
| 2002 | B.S (pilot) | Creator, executive producer |
| 2002-2006 | Half & Half | Creator, consulting producer |
| 2006-2007 | The Class | Creator, writer, executive producer |
| 2011-2017 | Episodes | Creator, writer, executive producer |

== Awards and nominations ==
| Year | Award | Category | Nominated work | Result | Ref |
|---|---|---|---|---|---|
| 1995 | Primetime Emmy Awards | Outstanding Comedy Series | Mad About You | Nominated (Note: Shared with Bruce Chevillat, Liz Coe, Eileen Conn, Victor Fresco, Andrew Gordon, Billy Grundfest, Danny Jacobson, Craig Knizek, Jeffrey Lane, Paul Reiser, and Marjorie Weitzman.) | |
| 2011 | Primetime Emmy Awards | Outstanding Writing for a Comedy Series | Episodes | Nominated (Note: Shared with David Crane.) | |
| 2012 | Writers Guild of America Awards | Television: New Series | Episodes | Nominated | |
| 2013 | Writers Guild of America Awards | Television: Episodic Comedy | Episodes | Nominated | |
| 2013 | British Academy Television Awards | Best Situation Comedy | Episodes | Nominated (Note: Shared with David Crane and Jimmy Mulville.) | |
| 2013 | Primetime Emmy Awards | Outstanding Writing for a Comedy Series | Episodes | Nominated | |
| 2014 | Primetime Emmy Awards | Outstanding Writing for a Comedy Series | Episodes | Nominated | |
| 2015 | Primetime Emmy Awards | Outstanding Writing for a Comedy Series | Episodes | Nominated | |
| 2017 | Nantucket Film Festival | Excellence in Television Writing | Episodes / Friends / The Class | Won | |
