= Music of Friends =

This is a discography of music related to the American sitcom Friends.

== Albums ==
=== Friends (Music from the TV Series) ===
Friends (Music from the TV Series)

Soundtrack album by Various artists
- Released: October 1995
- Genres: Pop rock, alternative rock
- Length: 49:35
- Label: WEA

Friends (Music from the TV Series) was an album released by WEA in 1995 featuring songs from the TV sitcom Friends. The songs were not originals written for the series, but were tracks either used directly in the show or "inspired by" the show. The album also featured small samples of spoken dialogue from the show's first season.

Friends (Music from the TV Series)
| No. | Title | Artist | Length |
|---|---|---|---|
| 1. | "I'll Be There for You" (TV version) | The Rembrandts | 1:32 |
| 2. | "I Go Blind" | Hootie & the Blowfish | 3:08 |
| 3. | "Good Intentions" | Toad the Wet Sprocket | 4:27 |
| 4. | "You'll Know You Were Loved" | Lou Reed | 2:28 |
| 5. | "Sexuality" | k.d. lang | 4:13 |
| 6. | "Shoe Box" | Barenaked Ladies | 2:57 |
| 7. | "It's a Free World Baby" | R.E.M. | 6:02 |
| 8. | "Sunshine" | Paul Westerberg | 2:23 |
| 9. | "Angel of the Morning" | Pretenders | 5:15 |
| 10. | "In My Room" | Grant Lee Buffalo | 2:41 |
| 11. | "Big Yellow Taxi" (Traffic Jam mix) | Joni Mitchell | 4:49 |
| 12. | "Stain Yer Blood" | Paul Westerberg | 4:02 |
| 13. | "I'll Be There for You" (Long version) | The Rembrandts | 5:36 |

- Chart position: #41 (U.S.)
- Worldwide sales: 1 million +
- Singles: "I'll Be There for You", "I Go Blind"

=== Friends Again ===
Friends Again

Soundtrack album by Various artists
- Released: November 23, 1999
- Recorded: Various
- Genre: Soundtrack
- Label: Reprise/WEA

Friends Again is a 1999 soundtrack album. It is the second Friends soundtrack album.

Friends Again
| No. | Title | Artist | Length |
|---|---|---|---|
| 1. | "Introduction" | | 1:38 |
| 2. | "Every Word Means No" | Smash Mouth | 2:45 |
| 3. | "Delicious" | Semisonic | 5:13 |
| 4. | "Trouble with Boys" | Loreta | 3:32 |
| 5. | "I Wouldn't Normally Do This Kind of Thing" | Robbie Williams | 4:01 |
| 6. | "Summer" | Lisa Loeb | 2:11 |
| 7. | "What Reason" | Deckard | 4:45 |
| 8. | "Angel and the Jerk" | Penelope Houston | 1:49 |
| 9. | "Question Everything" | 8stops7 | 5:29 |
| 10. | "Smelly Cat Medley" | Phoebe Buffay and The Hairballs | 2:27 |
| 11. | "View from the Other Side" | Duncan Sheik | 6:02 |
| 12. | "Beats the Hell Out of Me" | Waltons | 4:33 |
| 13. | "Friends 'Til the End (I'll Be There for You)" (Remix) | Thor-El | 4:10 |
| 14. | "Friends 'Til the End (I'll Be There for You)" | Thor-El | 4:00 |

- Worldwide sales: 0.5 million
- Singles: "Question Everything"

=== Friends: The One with All the Party Music ===
Friends: The One with All the Party Music

Soundtrack album by Various artists
- Released: 2004
- Recorded: Various
- Genre: Soundtrack
- Label: Reprise/WEA

Friends: The One with All the Party Music is a 2004 soundtrack EP and was marketed as a 6-track CD sampler. It is the third Friends soundtrack, following Friends Again (1999).

| No. | Artist | Title | Episode and scene in which the song appears |
|---|---|---|---|
| 1 | The Mighty Mighty Bosstones | "The Impression That I Get" | "The One with the Fake Party" (season 4, episode 16). Phoebe Buffay (Lisa Kudrow) hungrily watches Joey Tribbiani (Matt LeBlanc) make a sandwich. |
| 2 | The Miracles | "Love Machine" | "The One Where Paul's the Man" (season 6, episode 22). Paul Stevens (Bruce Willis) croons, looking at himself in the mirror. |
| 3 | Peaches & Herb | "Shake Your Groove Thing" | "Friends: The Stuff You've Never Seen" (season 7, special episode). Fat Monica Gellar (Courteney Cox) dances. |
| 4 | Barenaked Ladies | "Shoe Box" | "The One with the Two Parties" (season 2, episode 22). Ross Gellar (David Schwimmer) tries to engage Rachel Green (Jennifer Aniston)'s father Leonard Green (Rob Leibman) in conversation while she's at the second party. |
| 5 | The Lemonheads | "Into Your Arms" | "The One with the Monkey" (season 1, episode 10). At the party, Chandler Bing (Matthew Perry) takes pictures with Janice Hosenstein (Maggie Wheeler), and Phoebe says goodbye to the scientist David (Hank Azaria). |
| 6 | The Rembrandts | "I'll Be There for You" | The opening theme throughout the series. |

=== Friends: The Ultimate Soundtrack ===
Friends: The Ultimate Soundtrack

Soundtrack album by Various artists
- Released: 2005
- Recorded: Various
- Genre: Soundtrack
- Label: Reprise/WEA

Friends: The Ultimate Soundtrack is a 2005 soundtrack album containing hits and some new unreleased tracks from the show.

CD 1:

| No. | Artist | Title | The episode of the series "Friends" |
|---|---|---|---|
| 1 | The Rembrandts | "I'll Be There for You" | The original theme in the series. |
| 2 | Cake | "Never There" | "The One Where Rachel Smokes" (season 5, episode 18). Playing at Rachel's birthday party. |
| 3 | Semisonic | "Closing Time" | "The One with Rachel's Date" (season 8, episode 5). The song plays at the end of the episode when Rachel walks into Central Perk. |
| 4 | Loreta | "Trouble with Boys" | "The One with the Routine" (season 6, episode 10). Monica and Ross do their dance routine. |
| 5 | Soft Cell | "Tainted Love" | "The One Where the Stripper Cries" (season 10, episode 11). The first song plays as stripper Officer Roy Goodbody (Danny DeVito) dances at Phoebe's bachelorette party. |
| 6 | Santana & Matchbox Twenty | "Smooth" | "The One Before the Last One" (season 10, special episode). Montage of Joey's moments. |
| 7 | Eric Clapton | "Wonderful Tonight" | "The One with the Proposal" (season 6, episode 25). Monica and Chandler dance after getting engaged. |
| 8 | Toad the Wet Sprocket | "Good Intentions" | "The One with the Two Parties". Playing at a party with Joey and Chandler, when Rachel realizes that both her parents Leonard and Sandra Green (Marlo Thomas) are present at her party. |
| 9 | The Police | "Don't Stand So Close to Me" | "The One Where Underdog Gets Away" (season 1, episode 9). The song plays as Joey's VD poster is displayed throughout New York City. |
| 10 | America | "A Horse with No Name" | "The One with Joey's Big Break" (season 5, episode 22). Joey goes to a Nevada film set. |
| 11 | Paul Westerberg | "Stain Yer Blood" | "The One with the Two Parties". Joey appears with a volleyball. |
| 12 | Cyndi Lauper | "Girls Just Wanna Have Fun" | "The One Before the Last One". Montage of Rachel, Monica and Phoebe's moments. |
| 13 | k.d. Lang | "Sexuality" | "The One with the Two Parties". Chandler discusses at the party that a girl stuck her tongue in his mouth. |
| 14 | Hoobastank | "The Reason" | "The One Before the Last One". Played during a montage of moments from the series. |
| 15 | Nelly featuring City Spud | "Ride wit Me" | "The One with Chandler's Dad" (season 7, episode 22). Rachel gets pulled over by Officer Hanson (Mark Consuelos). |
| 16 | Sylvester | "You Make Me Feel (Mighty Real)" | "The One Where the Stripper Cries". Officer Goodbody continues his stripper routine. |
| 17 | Chris Isaak | "Wicked Game" | "The One Where Ross and Rachel...You Know" (season 2, episode 15). Ross and Rachel make out in a planetarium. |

CD 2:

| No. | Artist | Title | The episode of the series "Friends" |
|---|---|---|---|
| 1 | R.E.M. | "Shiny Happy People" | "The One with the Monkey". The song that plays at the beginning of the New Year's Eve party. |
| 2 | Barenaked Ladies | "Shoe Box" | "The One with the Two Parties" |
| 3 | Lipps Inc. | "Funky Town" | "The One Where the Stripper Cries". Monica and Rachel dance at Ross' college party. |
| 4 | Interpol | "Untitled" | "The One in Barbados" (season 9, episode 24). Joey kisses Rachel. |
| 5 | Eric Carmen | "All By Myself" | "The One Where Eddie Moves In" (season 2, episode 17). Joey and Chandler in their apartments missing each other. |
| 6 | After the Fire | "Der Kommissar" | "The One Where the Stripper Cries". The song plays during a college party flashback 16 years prior. |
| 7 | 8stops7 | "Question Everything" | Featured on the soundtrack but not in any episodes of the series. |
| 8 | Madonna | "Take a Bow" | "The One Where Rachel Finds Out" (season 1, episode 24). When Rachel is waiting for Ross at the airport |
| 9 | Cornershop | "Brimful of Asha" | "The One with the Fake Party". Played at a going away party for Emily Waltham (Helen Baxendale). |
| 10 | Eve & Gwen Stefani | "Let Me Blow Ya Mind" | "The One with the Stripper" (season 8, episode 8). Monica performs a striptease. |
| 11 | Barry Manilow | "Looks Like We Made It" | "The One After the Superbowl" (season 2, episode 13). Ross is walks with Marcel in New York. |
| 12 | The Zombies | "Time of the Season" | "The One with the Flashback" (season 3, episode 6). Rachel plays the song on a jukebox. |
| 13 | Big Bad Voodoo Daddy | "Big Time Operator" | "The One Where They All Turn Thirty" (season 7, episode 14). The song plays during Monica's surprise party. |
| 14 | The Clash | "London Calling" | "The One with Ross's Wedding" (season 4, episode 23). Joey and Chandler walk around London. |
| 15 | Alicia Keys | "Fallin'" | "The One with the Birthing Video" (season 8, episode 15). Chandler comes into the apartment and discovers the birthing videotape. |
| 16 | U2 | "With or Without You" | "The One with the List" (season 2, episode 8). Ross dedicates this song on the radio to Rachel. "The One Where Ross and Rachel Take a Break" (season 3, episode 15). Ross dances with and kisses Chloe (Angela Featherstone) at a party. |
| 17 | Phoebe Buffay & The Hairballs | "Smelly Cat Medley" | |

=== Friends 25th Anniversary ===
Friends 25th Anniversary

Soundtrack album by Various artists
- Released: 2019
- Recorded: Various
- Genre: Soundtrack
- Label: WaterTower Music

Friends 25th Anniversary is a soundtrack album released in 2019, containing 171 tracks with "сast performances and dialogue".

== Singles ==
| Year | Song | Artist | Chart positions | | | | | Album |
| Year | Song | Artist | US Hot 100 | US Mainstream Rock | US Adult Contemporary | US Adult Recurrents | UK Singles Chart | Album |
|---|---|---|---|---|---|---|---|---|
| (originally 1970) | "Big Yellow Taxi" | Joni Mitchell | 67 | - | - | - | 11 | Friends |
| 1995 | "I'll Be There for You" | The Rembrandts | 17 | 1 | 1 | - | 3 | Friends |
| 1995 | "Good Intentions" | Toad the Wet Sprocket | - | 19 | 19 | - | - | Friends |
| 1996 | "I Go Blind" | Hootie & the Blowfish | - | 17 | 22 | 3 | - | Friends |
| 1997 | "I'll Be There for You" (re-release) | The Rembrandts | - | - | - | - | 5 | Friends |
| 1999 | "Smelly Cat" (promo only) | Phoebe Buffay | - | - | - | - | - | Friends Again |
