= The One Where Dr. Ramoray Dies =

- Friends episode
- Episode no.: Season 2 Episode 18
- Directed by: Michael Lembeck
- Story by: Alexa Junge
- Teleplay by: Michael Borkow
- Production code: 457318
- Original air date: March 21, 1996

Guest appearances
- Tom Selleck as Richard Burke; Adam Goldberg as Eddie Menuek; Brian Posehn as Messenger; James E. Reilly as Writer; Roark Critchlow as Dr. Horton

Episode chronology
← Previous "The One Where Eddie Moves In"	Next → "The One Where Eddie Won't Go"
- Friends season 2

"The One Where Dr. Ramoray Dies" is the eighteenth episode of the second season of the television situation comedy Friends and the 42nd episode overall.

== Plot ==
Joey does an interview with Soap Opera Digest in which he claims that he makes up most of his lines on Days of Our Lives. When the show's writers read the interview, they kill off Joey's character, Dr. Drake Ramoray, by having him fall down an elevator shaft. Joey is devastated, and his friends rush to his apartment to comfort him as he mulls over losing the greatest opportunity he ever had.

Chandler is having trouble bonding with his new roommate Eddie, as he spends most of his time in his room. Phoebe tricks them into spending time drinking beers and talking to each other about their ex-girlfriends. Later, Eddie's ex-girlfriend Tilly stops by the apartment to drop off Eddie's fish tank and meets Chandler briefly before Eddie walks out to greet her. After she leaves, Eddie immediately accuses Chandler of sleeping with Tilly and killing his goldfish, then steals Chandler's insoles in retaliation. After Chandler returns home from comforting Joey, he finds Eddie has replaced his goldfish with a goldfish cracker and baked what Eddie dubiously claims are "raisin cookies".

After playing at Central Perk while Monica and Richard are on a double date with Rachel and Ross, Phoebe claims that Monica has had sex with many boyfriends, leaving Richard curious about the number. They take the argument back to Monica and Rachel's apartment while Ross and Rachel retreat to Rachel's bedroom. Monica is stunned when Richard says he has only been with two women – her and his ex-wife Barbara – and those two women he has been in love with. Touched, Monica admits she loves him, too. Meanwhile, Ross asks Rachel to list her own sexual conquests, but when she describes her relationship with Paolo as "meaningless animal sex", Ross gets upset at her. Rachel manages to assuage him by telling him that she prefers the tenderness and intimacy of their own relationship. When Rachel claims he is the best sex she has ever had, Ross promptly offers to give her "animal sex" of his own.

Monica and Rachel head to the bathroom to celebrate but argue with each other when they find out they have only one condom, while Ross and Richard awkwardly talk to each other in the living room. Rachel gets the condom after she wins a game of rock, paper, scissors against Monica, forcing Monica and Richard to delay their plans.

On another night, Ross, wearing Rachel's bathrobe, sneaks toward the bathroom to retrieve a condom. Richard then appears from Monica's room with the same objective, while wearing her robe. They have a brief, awkward exchange before agreeing never to speak of it.

== Reception ==
This episode forms the basis of a study published in Pediatrics on "the impact of condom-efficacy messages in an episode of Friends on teens". During a discussion about v-chips, Connecticut senator Joseph Lieberman told series co-creator Marta Kauffman that he was appalled by the scene where Monica and Rachel fight over the last condom and turned off his television. Kauffman dismissed Lieberman's comments because he misunderstood the scene; the characters were advocating safe sex by agreeing that whoever did not have the condom could not have sex.
