= Smelly Cat =

Song by Phoebe Buffay and the Hairballs

from the album Friends Again
- Released: November 23, 1999
- Recorded: 1995–1999
- Genre: Pop; folk
- Length: 2:27
- Label: Reprise; WEA
- Songwriters: Adam Chase; Betsy Borns; Chrissie Hynde; Lisa Kudrow

"Smelly Cat" is a comedy song from the American sitcom Friends (1994–2004), performed by American actress Lisa Kudrow. Friends writers Adam Chase and Betsy Borns wrote it with musician Chrissie Hynde and Kudrow for the latter's character, Phoebe Buffay. It first appears in the sixth episode of the show's second season, "The One with the Baby on the Bus" (1995). Hynde guest stars in the episode as Stephanie Schiffer, a singer hired to replace Phoebe as Central Perk's in-house musician, to whom Phoebe eventually teaches "Smelly Cat".

Borns had intended to write the song about a dog, basing it on her own pet dog Gouda, but ultimately decided that a song about a pungent cat would be funnier. Chase and other Friends writers, including series creator David Crane, developed the song out of lyrics that had originated as dialogue. Following its debut, Kudrow would continue to perform "Smelly Cat" frequently throughout Friends' ten-year run, most prominently during the show's second season, with the song evolving into a running gag and integral component of Phoebe's role. The song's popularity grew among fans to the point where they asked for it to be officially released as an album track. Kudrow and Hynde's band the Pretenders, credited as Phoebe Buffay and the Hairballs, recorded an updated version entitled "Smelly Cat Medley" for the soundtrack album Friends Again (1999). Musically, "Smelly Cat" is an acoustic pop and folk novelty song about an odorous cat who is mistreated and neglected by its owners due to its stench.

Established as a fan favorite, "Smelly Cat" has become closely associated with Phoebe, Kudrow, and the series, and is often ranked highly by media publications among Friends' most memorable moments and featured songs, even rivaling the show's theme song "I'll Be There for You" by the Rembrandts in terms of popularity. "Smelly Cat" has been covered by several artists, including Friends guest stars E. G. Daily, Chris Isaak, and James Michael Tyler, co-star Courteney Cox, and singer Colbie Caillat. Kudrow also performed "Smelly Cat" with Taylor Swift live during the singer's 1989 World Tour in 2015, with footage of the duet garnering widespread media attention and becoming a viral sensation. During Friends' 2021 reunion television special, Kudrow performed a special rendition of the song with Lady Gaga. The session vocalist that dubbed "Smelly Cat" vocals was voice of Gypsy Queen’s Paula Mattioli.

== Background and writing ==
On the American sitcom Friends (1994–2004), actress Lisa Kudrow plays Phoebe Buffay, an eccentric masseuse and amateur singer-songwriter with little musical talent. The character often performs some of her original, unusual songs at Central Perk, a New York coffeehouse where she and her five friends socialize with each other. "Smelly Cat" was written for the character by Kudrow with Adam Chase, Betsy Borns, and Chrissie Hynde. The song was conceived in 1995 by Borns, a Friends writer who had intended for it to be about a dog. Tending to incorporate her personal life into Friends storylines, Borns initially based the song on a malodorous dog she had owned as a child named Gouda (after the cheese), at first describing the concept "as an ode to her childhood pet". She ultimately decided a song about a foul-smelling cat would be funnier.

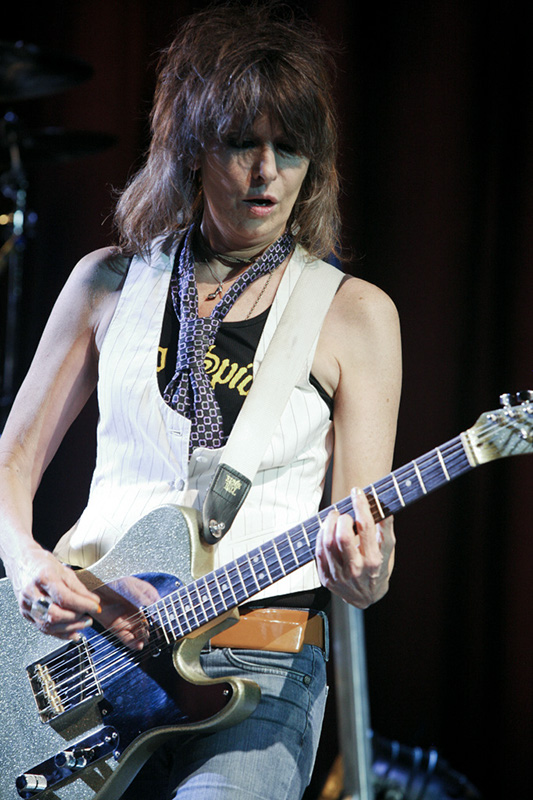
In addition to guest starring in "The One with the Baby on the Bus", musician Chrissie Hynde co-wrote "Smelly Cat" with Lisa Kudrow and performs it in the episode.

"Smelly Cat" first appears in the sixth episode of the second season, "The One with the Baby on the Bus" (1995), which Borns also wrote. Chase, another writer for Friends, also contributed lyrics, which originated as dialogue for the episode. He suggested that Phoebe sing a song called "Smelly Cat", a title he had pitched because the show "just needed a funny song title". Once the writers decided when the character would sing in the episode, they collaborated on evolving the dialogue into lyrics. According to Chase, much of "Smelly Cat" was improvised during late-night sessions in the Friends writer's room, with "two or three people around the table adding lines on the spot". Series creator David Crane and writer Jeff Astrof also took turns suggesting different lines that and phrases that were ultimately included in the final song, such as Astrof's "What are they feeding you?". Kudrow composed the melody herself, as she had done for all of her character's original songs. She recalled, "The words to the song were penned down by some very intelligent scriptwriters. But it was me who came up with the tune underneath the words".

During the episode's live taping, Chase suggested to Crane that the song would be funnier if Kudrow emphasized the word "smelly" instead of the expected word "cat". Typically, writers do not offer notes once filming began, unless a scene did not work completely. With some hesitation, Crane suggested the note to Kudrow, and the revision ultimately resulted in a louder laugh from the studio audience. Hynde, lead singer of rock band The Pretenders, guest stars in the episode as Stephanie Schiffer, a professional singer hired to replace Phoebe as Central Perk's resident musician. Phoebe initially protests being fired from her gig, but eventually teaches her "Smelly Cat" by the end of the episode. Hynde co-wrote the song's music with Kudrow, who described writing with Hynde as "amazing". The musician had agreed to guest star on Friends with little knowledge about how popular the relatively new sitcom had already become in the United States, having not heard about the show prior to being cast. In the episode, Hynde performs a somber version of "Smelly Cat" on acoustic guitar to a full Central Perk audience. Hynde also performs The Pretenders' cover of "Angel of the Morning" in the same episode. In later years, Hynde has said she has always regretted her appearance on the show for ruining her anonymity once the episode aired.

"Smelly Cat" grew increasingly popular among fans of the show, who sent letters to producers asking that they release the song on an album. Upon realizing the song's popularity, Reprise Records' Howie Klein expressed interest in developing a concept album based around "Smelly Cat" as a follow-up to the previous years' Friends album, but Kudrow's participation in the project was undecided. An updated version of the song entitled "Smelly Cat Medley" was eventually released on the soundtrack album Friends Again (1999), credited to Phoebe Buffay and the Hairballs. The track is a combination of "Smelly Cat" excerpts from various episodes, featuring vocals from Kudrow and The Pretenders. Although the album's cover features all six of the show's main cast members – Kudrow, Jennifer Aniston, Courteney Cox, Matt LeBlanc, Matthew Perry and David Schwimmer – Kudrow was the only main cast member to contribute a song.

== Use in Friends ==
"Smelly Cat" is one of several songs Phoebe writes and performs on Friends. Debuting in "The One with the Baby on the Bus", which aired on November 2, 1995, Phoebe first mentions the song to Rachel Green (Aniston) in conversation. The song is initially established as Phoebe's least popular among audiences. In the episode, Stephanie struggles to play "Smelly Cat" to Phoebe's liking, with Phoebe advising the character to work on feeling the song's lyrics. "Smelly Cat" proved popular and would continue to make several appearances throughout Friends' ten seasons, primarily via various performances and renditions by Phoebe. Although intended to be a one-time joke, the writers continued to conceive ways of incorporating the song into the series, creating various storylines that revolve around "Smelly Cat". I'll Be There for You: The One About Friends author Kelsey Miller confirmed that the composition was used most frequently during the show's second season, with Phoebe singing it at Central Perk regularly. The song would become one of the show's most used running gags.

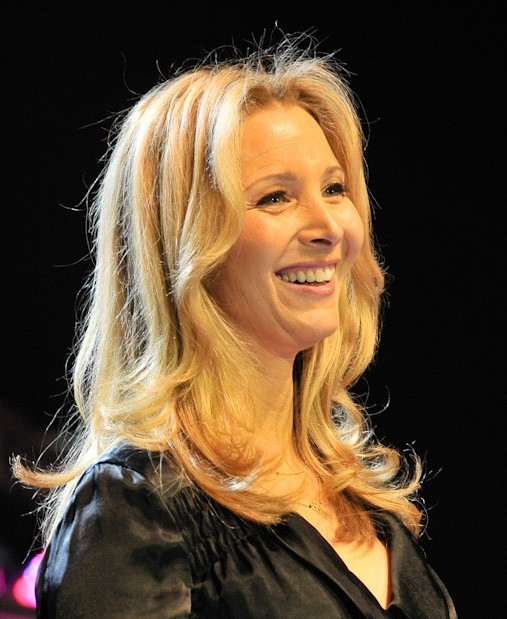
In addition to portraying Phoebe, actress Lisa Kudrow co-wrote the music to "Smelly Cat", which she would perform consistently throughout the show's ten seasons.

The song appears in season two's "The One Where Eddie Moves In", in which Phoebe attempts to record a professional rendition of the song in a recording studio. She struggles to record with background singers. Phoebe eventually films a music video for the song, for which her voice is ultimately dubbed by a professional singer, voiced by E. G. Daily. Phoebe initially believes she is hearing herself sing and thinks she sounds good. Upon learning the truth, Phoebe ultimately feels sorry for the anonymous singer instead of pitying herself. The song is then heard in season three's "The One with Phoebe's Ex-Partner", in which Leslie (again portrayed by Daily), a singer with whom Phoebe used to perform, suggests that "Smelly Cat" be adapted into a jingle for a cat litter commercial. Phoebe ultimately refuses the offer, but Leslie sells the song without Phoebe's permission, prompting her to write "Jingle Bitch" about Leslie. The product is named "Smelly Cat" Kitty Litter, after the song. In "The One After the Superbowl", Phoebe performs the song as a duet with Rob, portrayed by musician Chris Isaak, although Phoebe criticizes his rendition, suggesting that the singer refrain from incorporating his signature high-pitched yodeling in favor of "a more masculine note". In reality, Isaak recalled that Kudrow was very friendly, offering to run lines and rehearse "Smelly Cat" with him. Phoebe also leads her friends in a sing-along version of "Smelly Cat" at Central Perk, each of whom contribute a solo, except Ross Geller (Schwimmer) because there are no more lines.

In season five's "The One with Joey's Bag", Phoebe's estranged father Frank Buffay (Bob Balaban) reveals that he used to sing her a lullaby called "Sleepy Girl", which shares "Smelly Cat"'s melody, as a baby, further establishing "Smelly Cat" as a fundamental aspect of Phoebe's life story. However, Sam Ashurst of Digital Spy identified this as a plot hole, since Phoebe had previously confirmed that her father abandons her before she was born, therefore he could not have been present to sing to her. Ashurst theorized that Phoebe could have been so determined to retain the copyright to her most famous song that she lied about its composer. According to Rachel Steinberg of Radio Times, "Smelly Cat" is heard nine times throughout the course of the series in various capacities. VH1 writer Stacy Lambe believes "Smelly Cat" once signified "a point in Phoebe's career when it seemed like her music was going to take off." The New Zealand Herald described the song as "Phoebe's acoustic anthem [which] echoed throughout the whole series." Following filming of the Friends series finale "The Last One" in January 2004, a wrap party was hosted for the cast and crew at Los Angeles' Park Plaza Hotel, at which a cocktail named after the song was served. A full version of the music video has been included on DVD releases of Friends.

== Composition ==
"Smelly cat, smel-ly cat, what are they feeding you?
Smelly cat, smel-ly cat, it's not your fault."

— lyrics of the song's first chorus.

Kudrow's original rendition of "Smelly Cat" has been described as a "folky, acoustic" track. The Toronto Star called it a "unique guitar ballad". According to HelloGiggles' Rachel Paige, the music video version is treated to a "90s remix" with heavy production. Amazon identified the updated "Smelly Cat Medley" as a pop song lasting two minutes and twenty-seven seconds (2:27) in duration. "Smelly Cat" alternates between three chords – E, A and D – although Phoebe never refers to chords by their traditional names. The song consists of a simple melody and humorous lyrics, with Comedy Central describing Kudrow's vocals as "strained".

A novelty song, MTV's Lindsay Soll wrote that "Smelly Cat" is about a "feline with a pungent odor", but Phoebe reassures the cat that its scent is not its own fault. Rachel Simon, writing for Bustle, summarized the track as a song about "a poor-smelling cat treated badly by society for its odor". The song's lyrics begin "Smelly cat, smelly cat, what are they feeding you?", followed by "Smelly cat, smelly cat it's not your fault." "Smelly Cat" continues, "It may not be a bed of roses/ but you're no friend to those with noses". NME critic Beth Cherry believes that the song "educate[s] the world about the plight of olfactorily-challenged felines everywhere." Ciara Knight of Joe considers the song's opening lyrics to be its most iconic.

Simon believes "Smelly Cat" explores an inspiring message beyond the odor of a cat about remaining unbothered while being bullied and shunned. Classic FM's Sofia Rizzi agreed that the song "has a deep and meaningful message at its core". Referring to the line "what are they feeding you?", Bustle's Mallory Schlossberg suggested that fans "may never know the answer to that deeply philosophical musical question". The song never reveals how or why the cat smells bad, or what its owners are feeding it. Kudrow confirmed that she never learned what the cat was being fed, although the general consensus is that the cat's diet contributed to its smell. The cat's gender is also never confirmed.

== Reception and popularity ==
Reviews for "Smelly Cat" have been generally positive. Cosmopolitan writer Jo Sayer reviewed "The One with the Baby on the Bus" as "an awesome episode because it's ... where Smelly Cat is first introduced." Newsweek called the song "legendary". A Medium contributor wrote that the song "has become an undetachable part of Phoebe's persona and her anthem". The Toronto Star's Melody L. Goh hailed "Smelly Cat" as "the best song to ever be played on Friends", while RTÉ declared it one of the series' greatest moments. Greg Gilman of TheWrap described "Smelly Cat" as "delightfully silly". Laura McClellan of Taste of Country deemed "Smelly Cat" "one of Phoebe's greatest quirky coffee house hits". Ilyse Liffreing of Ad Age reviewed one of Phoebe's "Smelly Cat" performances as "One of the most memorable scenes" from the series, which the author believes in turn "solidified Phoebe as their show favorite." The Honolulu Star-Advertiser's Betty Shimabukuro described "Smelly Cat" as "legendary for its tunelessness and total fusion with the Phoebe personality", and suggested that fans seek solace by singing the song following the show's finale. Conversely, Wired writer Travis Reilly described the track as "notoriously awful", while The Washington Post journalist Jennifer Frey dismissed the song's several renditions as "painful".

Digital Spy ranked "Smelly Cat" among "12 amazing Phoebe moments". Sammy Nickalls, writing for HelloGiggles, believes "Smelly Cat" "will go down in history for the best song about an odorous pet". Madison Malone Kircher of Business Insider wrote that "Smelly Cat" predated the Internet as a viral meme by "becoming an oft-quoted and mimicked cultural touchstone for fans of the show." Victoria Dawson Hoff of Elle observed that the song threatens to "unseat 'I'll Be There For You' as the song that's most synonymous with Friends", explaining that fans still struggle to "get it out of our heads" nearly 20 years after it was released. Bustle's Rachel Simon agreed that "Smelly Cat" rivals "the theme song as one of the show's most unforgettable musical moments". CinemaBlend contributor Jessica Rawden attributes the song's popularity to several storylines that established "Smelly Cat" as an important aspect of Phoebe's life, ultimately becoming "ingrained into the cultural fiber of Friends". Cosmopolitan's Ellen Scott described the song as "glorious" and "iconic", to which any true fan knows the lyrics. VRT described it as "painful for the ears, but in the collective memory". Conversely, Lindsey Weber of Vulture found "Smelly Cat" is "overrated", believing it to be inferior to Phoebe's angrier songs.

== Live performances and covers ==
Kudrow has generally refrained from performing "Smelly Cat" live under most circumstances, despite being constantly asked by fans. The song began to experience a revival in 2009 when a dance remix began circulating on the Internet. Upon learning about the remix, Kudrow said "I can't wait to hear if it is any good". In September 2009, Kudrow performed "Smelly Cat" live with actress Courteney Cox, who portrayed Monica Geller on Friends, during the Rock A Little, Feed A Lot benefit concert. Kudrow was intended to introduce musician Sheryl Crow, only for the audience to ask her to sing "Smelly Cat" instead. Kudrow then invited Cox to join her for the performance, for which the stagehands provided Kudrow with a guitar at Cox's insistence. The performance was met with a standing ovation from the crowd. Hello! joked that "hitting the right notes wasn't really a concern [for the actresses] if they wanted the performance to reflect Lisa's character's dubious musical talents", while Inquisitr's Asher Bayot reviewed the duet as awkward. The performance remained Kudrow's only documented post-Friends "Smelly Cat" performance for several years.

In 2014, singer-songwriter Colbie Caillat sang an a capella version of "Smelly Cat" live at a Central Perk-themed pop-up café in Manhattan, New York, which had been launched to commemorate the show's 20th anniversary. Caillat's unscheduled performance surprised many fans in attendance, who she encouraged to sing along. Despite praising Caillat's rendition as "awesome" for "fulfill[ing] every Friends fanatic's fantasy", Bustle's Aly Semigran criticized her for performing only half of the song. However, she believes her rendition should lead to a Phoebe tribute album, on which she should reprise "Smelly Cat". At the same pop-up, actor James Michael Tyler, who portrayed Central Perk barista Gunther, performed the first verse of the song with band The Rembrandts, who recorded "I'll Be There for You". Brent Furdyk of Entertainment Tonight Canada described the Tyler-Rembrandts rendition as "Jim Morrison-esque". A box of "Smelly Cat" kitty litter from the episode "The One with Phoebe's Ex-Partner" was displayed as part of the pop-up's exhibit.

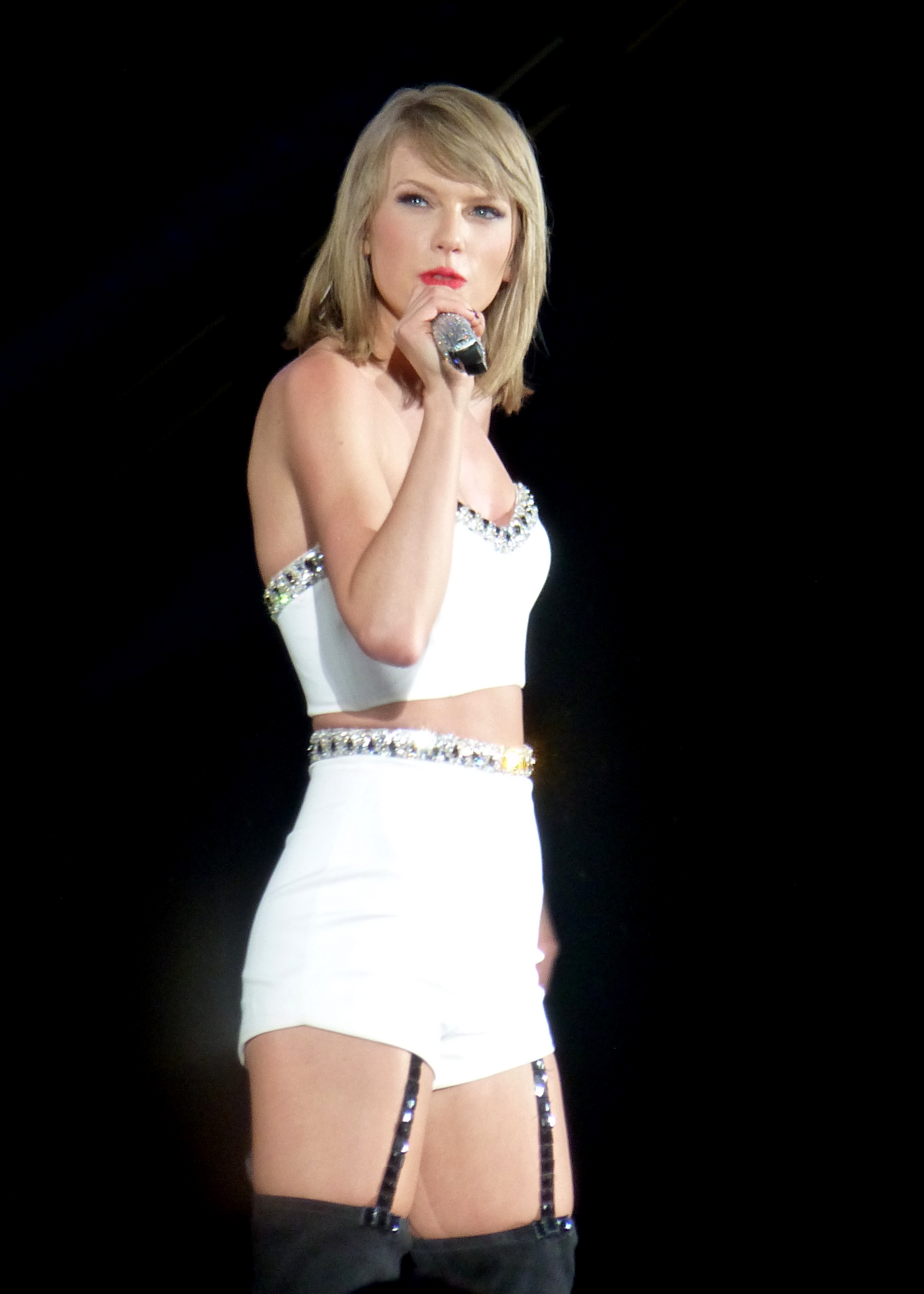
Singer Taylor Swift invited Kudrow to perform "Smelly Cat" with her live during one of the final performances of her 1989 World Tour.

In August 2015, Kudrow performed "Smelly Cat" live with singer Taylor Swift at the Staples Center during the final North American legs of her 1989 World Tour. Her fifth and final performance at the venue, Swift introduced Kudrow as Phoebe Buffay, advising the audience that "She's only ever played in coffee houses before. She's never played in a big venue like this". Kudrow then entered the stage wearing a long skirt reminiscent of Phoebe's wardrobe. Adopting her character's personality, both Kudrow and Swift accompanied themselves on guitar. Kudrow interrupted Swift midway through the duet to offer feedback and remind her to feel the song's lyrics, prompting screams and laughter from the audience. Referencing her duet with Hynde, Kudrow ultimately assured Swift that she master the song eventually. The performance was widely reported and positively received by media outlets. Yvonne Villarreal of the Los Angeles Times found the rendition superior to "Smelly Cat's" "over-produced music video" from "The One Where Eddie Moves In". The Daily Telegraph's Helena Horton called Kudrow's performance "the sweetest" of all the guest appearances throughout Swift's tour. Stylist agreed that Kudrow's appearance "might top" all other guests, calling it superior to singers Selena Gomez and Justin Timberlake's cameos at the same concert, while Screener's Andrea Reiher concurred that Kudrow was arguably Swift's "best guest of the entire '1989' run", concluding that the singer once again "wins at life". Heather Saul of The Independent crowned Kudrow "the highlight of all of [Swift's] cameos", eclipsing Timberlake's first stage appearance since becoming a father.

Michel Serra of Closer reviewed that Kudrow "has not lost any of Phoebe's intonations", despite being performed 10 years after the actress had last played the role. Business Insider's Madison Malone Kircher found the song to be "an excellent fit for Swift" due to her love of cats, despite being "a far cry from the tracks on her '80s-pop-inspired ... album". Tessa Berenson of Time wrote that Swift "may have outdone herself" by duetting with Kudrow, suggesting that Swift's next album should be a cover album of Phoebe songs. Rachel Paige of HelloGiggles declared that it would be difficult for Swift to ever top this moment, while HuffPost contributor Stephanie Marcus called Swift's decision to perform with Kudrow "genius" and "glorious". A critic for The New Zealand Herald described the rendition as "a whole new – and slightly surreal – experience to see it performed with pop royalty in front of a huge stadium audience." Fan recordings of the performance became very popular on the Internet being heavily circulated on social media, with both Swift and "Smelly Cat" trending on Facebook and Twitter, respectively, the following morning. The videos quickly earned millions of views, becoming the most viral guest performance from the tour. Time ranked the performance Swift's seventh best moment of 2015. However, Vice's Mitchell Sunderland questioned whether Swift's target demographic of fans born in and after 1999 were truly familiar with Kudrow and the song. As of 2016, E. G. Daily sometimes performs the song during her shows.

To commemorate the show's 25th anniversary in September 2019, a flash mob of 25 women dressed as Phoebe assembled in New York's Union Square and performed "Smelly Cat". In tribute to the character, each woman donned a suede fringe jacket, blonde wig, and guitar, replicating one of Phoebe's outfits from the series. The impersonators also sang the song at each location they stopped, including The Today Show, WPIX TV and Grand Central Station. The performers used the occasion to raise awareness for pet rescue and encourage witnesses to adopt a cat, on behalf of the Best Friends Animal Society. During Friends' 2021 reunion television special, Kudrow performed a special rendition of "Smelly Cat" with Lady Gaga.

== Legacy ==
"Smelly Cat" has since been established as a fan and cult favorite. Although Phoebe performs nearly 40 original songs over Friends' ten-year run, "Smelly Cat" is considered her breakout hit and signature song, as well as "her most famous creation". According to The Times of India, Phoebe made the song "real and iconic at the same time" to the point at which "its used worldwide by fans." In 2014, Kudrow revealed that fans constantly ask her to sing the song, but she refuses. USA Today ranked the lyrics of "Smelly Cat" among the actress' best Friends quotes. More included "Smelly Cat" among "The 15 Best Moments In 'Friends' History", with author Effie Orfanides deeming it "one of the best things to come out of the series", insisting that all fans know its lyrics. "Smelly Cat" is one of the most enduring songs from the sitcom, having "become ubiquitous in pop culture's collective consciousness", according to Ellen Gutoskey of Mental Floss. Première magazine described it as "one of the most iconic songs on American television". VH1 ranked "Smelly Cat" Friends' best musical moment, ahead of "I'll Be There for You". Author Kat George called the song "as essential to Friends as the shows theme song", even going on to crown it "the show's unofficial theme song." E! also ranked the song first, writing that the character "turned the sincere lyrics into one of her most acclaimed (laughed) 'hits'." In a similar article, Billboard critic Erin Strecker deemed the track "a classic" among Phoebe's songs. According to Shaad D'Souza of The Guardian, "Smelly Cat" is "arguably the most famous in-world TV song of all time".

NDTV recognized "Smelly Cat" as one of Friends' 20 funniest moments, citing its music video as their favorite rendition. E! considers "Smelly Cat, Smelly Cat" to be among Friends' 25 most quotable moments. Classic FM ranked "Smelly Cat" Phoebe's best song, with writer Sofia Rizzi calling it "a post-modern work of art" that remains "an anthem for fans of the show today." Metro's Hanna Flint declared the song "arguably one of the most memorable songs in the history of television." Marie Claire believes "Smelly Cat" has grown to be nearly as ubiquitous as "Happy Birthday" and Christmas carols, calling it "everyone's favourite Friends song" and concluding, "Despite belting out dozens of ditties during the 10 season run of Friends, the musical talent of Phoebe Buffay will always be remembered through the lyrical genius that is Smelly Cat." In 2016, Comedy Central crowned the song "one of the most iconic tunes of the 90s", calling it a "timeless" track because fans can recall its lyrics 21 years later.

In addition to ranking "Smelly Cat" first on BuzzFeed's "Definitive Ranking Of Phoebe Buffay's Top 40 Songs", author Tasmai Uppin called it "the ultimate Phoebe Buffay song" against which all of her songs are compared. Entertainment Weekly ranked "Smelly Cat" Phoebe's fifth greatest song, with author Hillary Busis calling it "iconic and charming and ready-made for merchandise" but questioned its popularity, considering it less funny than some of her other songs. Busis also praised its music video. The Irish Independent included "Smelly Cat" as one of Friends' 10 best moments, about which author Aishling Phelan wrote that Phoebe "created some pretty comical and sometimes disturbing songs, but Smelly Cat emerged as her trademark number." Phelan went on to describe its lyrics as "deep and eloquent", but dismissed its music video as "cheesy". Although VH1 ranked "Smelly Cat" the third "Best (Fake) Song Written For TV", author Stacy Lambe critiqued the music video version as "overproduced". Meanwhile, Abi Jackson of Stylist included the costume Phoebe wears in the "Smelly Cat" music video among "The 50 most iconic fashion and beauty moments in Friends", calling it "One of Phoebe's best sartorial moments" and joking "forget Lady Gaga, this is how music videos should be".

Ranking "Smelly Cat" among Friends' 10 best running gags, Gillian Furmage of WOW247 wrote that the show simply "wouldn't be Friends without the anthem that is 'Smelly Cat'." Calling it one of television's 12 best running gags, Refinery29's wrote that the song "still brings the laughs years after the show's end." Erin Fitzpatrick of Digital Spy ranked "Smelly Cat" the 11th best original song from within a television show. Kat George of Bustle ranked the video the third best video the Friends characters watched during the series, while ranking the commercial for the single seventh. Although Hyndes used to get annoyed by fans asking her to perform "Smelly Cat" on stage, she has grown used to the popularity of it and now considers the song to be "probably my biggest legacy now". Portuguese comedy group Gato Fedorento named themselves after "Smelly Cat", which translates to Gato Fedorento in Portuguese. To commemorate the show's 25th anniversary in September 2019, Google created several Friends-themed easter eggs which appear in the search results when the name of a main character is searched. Searching "Phoebe Buffay" or "Phoebe" returned an image of a guitar which, when clicked, promoted Kudrow's rendition of "Smelly Cat" to play in the background, while a black cat walks across the screen as a green cloud of gas is excreted from its backside to indicate its stench.
