= Friends season 1 =

Season of television series

Friends
- Season 1
- Friends season 1 DVD cover
- Showrunners: David Crane; Marta Kauffman
- Starring: Jennifer Aniston; Courteney Cox; Lisa Kudrow; Matt LeBlanc; Matthew Perry; David Schwimmer
- No. of episodes: 24

Release
- Original network: NBC
- Original release: September 22, 1994 – May 18, 1995

Season chronology
- Next → Season 2

The first season of the American television sitcom Friends aired on NBC from September 22, 1994 to May 18, 1995.

== Cast and characters ==
=== Main cast ===
- Jennifer Aniston as Rachel Green
- Courteney Cox as Monica Geller
- Lisa Kudrow as Phoebe Buffay
- Matt LeBlanc as Joey Tribbiani
- Matthew Perry as Chandler Bing
- David Schwimmer as Ross Geller

=== Recurring cast ===
- Anita Barone/Jane Sibbett as Carol Willick
- Mitchell Whitfield as Barry Farber
- Cosimo Fusco as Paolo
- Maggie Wheeler as Janice Hosenstein
- Jessica Hecht as Susan Bunch
- Vincent Ventresca as Fun Bobby
- Elliott Gould as Jack Geller
- Christina Pickles as Judy Geller
- Larry Hankin as Mr. Heckles
- James Michael Tyler as Gunther

=== Guest stars ===
- Merrill Markoe as Marsha, Ross' boss
- Jill Goodacre as herself
- Hank Azaria as David
- Morgan Fairchild as Nora Bing
- Fisher Stevens as Roger
- Jon Lovitz as Steve
- Helen Hunt as Jamie Buchman
- Leila Kenzle as Fran Devanow
- George Clooney as Dr. Mitchell
- Noah Wyle as Dr. Rosen
- Jennifer Grey as Mindy
- Claudia Shear as Fake Monica
- Leah Remini as Lydia
- Jonathan Silverman as Dr. Franzblau
- Corinne Bohrer as Melanie
- Lauren Tom as Julie
- Sofia Milos as Aurora
- Jennifer Grant as Nina
- John Allen Nelson as Paul the Wine Guy
- Geoffrey Lower as Alan
- Beth Grant as Lizzy
- Marianne Hagan as Joanne
- Camille Saviola as The Horrible Woman
- June Gable as The nurse
- Lee Garlington as Ronni Rapalano
- Brenda Vaccaro as Gloria Tribbiani
- Robert Costanzo as Joey Tribbiani Sr.
- Dorien Wilson as Mr. Douglas
- Wayne Péré as Max

== Episodes ==
No. overall	No. in season	Title	Directed by	Written by	Original release date	Prod. code	U.S. viewers (millions)
1	1	"Pilot" (Note: Alternative titles given to the pilot episode are "The One Where Monica Gets a Roommate", "The First One" and "The One Where It All Began".) "The One Where Monica Gets a Roommate"	James Burrows	Marta Kauffman & David Crane	September 22, 1994	475085	21.5
After leaving her fiancé, Barry, at the altar, Rachel (Jennifer Aniston) finds herself in Central Perk Café, soaking wet in her wedding dress, looking for her old friend Monica (Courteney Cox). Rachel ends up moving into Monica's New York apartment. Chandler (Matthew Perry) and Joey (Matt LeBlanc), who live across the hall from Monica, console Monica's older brother, Ross (David Schwimmer), whose wife, Carol, has just left him for a woman; Rachel's reappearance revives Ross' crush on her, which dates back to high school. Monica falls for Paul "the wine guy," (John Allen Nelson) only to be crushed to learn that he lied about a bad breakup to have a one-night stand with her. The gang urges Rachel to be more independent by cutting up her father's credit cards; Rachel, who has never worked before, subsequently gets a job as a waitress at Central Perk. Guest Starring: John Allen Nelson as Paul, Clea Lewis as Franny
2	2	"The One with the Sonogram at the End"	James Burrows	Marta Kauffman & David Crane	September 29, 1994	456652	20.2
Carol (Anita Barone) tells Ross that she is pregnant with his child. When Ross attends the sonogram appointment, he is stunned to learn that Carol and her partner, Susan (Jessica Hecht), want to give the baby their last names, but not his. Rachel returns her engagement ring to Barry (Mitchell Whitfield), expecting him to be heartbroken, but learns he went on their cancelled honeymoon with her maid-of-honor, Mindy. Monica stresses over her and Ross' parents (Christina Pickles and Elliott Gould) coming for dinner, knowing her mother will fawn over Ross while criticizing her. Guest starring: Christina Pickles as Judy Geller, Anita Barone as Carol, Jessica Hecht as Susan, Mitchell Whitfield as Barry, and Elliott Gould as Jack Geller. Note: This is Anita Barone's only appearance as Carol. Jane Sibbett appears as Carol in all following appearances.
3	3	"The One with the Thumb"	James Burrows	Jeffrey Astrof & Mike Sikowitz	October 6, 1994	456651	19.5
Monica is dismayed that everyone likes her new boyfriend, Alan, more than she does; when Monica eventually dumps him, Alan admits he dislikes her friends. Chandler, while helping Joey practice for an acting job, starts smoking again; when the gang complains, he diverts the attention onto their own flaws. Phoebe (Lisa Kudrow)’s bank accidentally deposits a large sum into her bank account; when she reports the error, the bank gives her even more money, as well as a novelty football telephone. Feeling guilty, Phoebe gives the money to a homeless friend, who buys her a can of soda in return, only to find a severed thumb inside it. The soda company pays Phoebe $7,000, which she gives Chandler to quit smoking.
4	4	"The One with George Stephanopoulos"	James Burrows	Alexa Junge	October 13, 1994	456654	19.7
Ross, feeling morose on the anniversary of his first time sleeping with Carol, attends a Rangers game with Chandler and Joey. When a hockey puck accidentally hits Ross in the face, Chandler and Joey take him to the emergency room; while there, Ross reveals that Carol is the only woman he has ever slept with. Rachel is upset that most of her first paycheck went to the FICA. When her old friends visit, she is even more depressed about her new life, feeling they are more successful than she is. Monica and Phoebe throw a slumber party that fails to cheer up Rachel, until the girls spy on George Stephanopoulos, who they learn is staying in the apartment across the street.
5	5	"The One with the East German Laundry Detergent"	Pamela Fryman	Jeff Greenstein & Jeff Strauss	October 20, 1994	456653	18.6
Chandler and Phoebe decide to break up with their respective partners, Janice (Maggie Wheeler) and Tony, at the same time. Phoebe's break-up goes smoothly, but Chandler has a harder time, requiring Phoebe's help. Ross and Rachel do laundry together, though Rachel has never done it before. While at the laundromat, Ross encourages Rachel to stand up to a pushy woman (Camille Saviola), earning him a platonic kiss from Rachel. Joey wants to get back together with his ex-girlfriend Angela, who is now seeing a man named Bob; he arranges a double date with Angela, Bob, and Monica, pretending that Monica is his new girlfriend while telling her that Angela and Bob are siblings. On the date, the ruse unravels due to the "inappropriate" behavior of the "siblings," forcing Joey to admit the lie to Monica, who he successfully convinces to work with him to break the couple apart. Note: This is Maggie Wheeler's first appearance as Janice.
6	6	"The One with the Butt"	Arlene Sanford	Adam Chase & Ira Ungerleider	October 27, 1994	456655	18.2
Chandler dates Aurora (Sofia Milos), a beautiful, exotic woman that he soon learns is married and has another boyfriend. Chandler is initially fine having a polyamorous relationship, but soon he finds himself unable to handle yet another lover being added to the mix. Joey's new talent agent, Estelle Leonard (June Gable), gets him a film role as Al Pacino’s butt double; he is later fired from the role because he "overacts." Rachel cleans the apartment but triggers Monica's obsessive-compulsive tendencies after moving some furniture around.
7	7	"The One with the Blackout"	James Burrows	Jeffrey Astrof & Mike Sikowitz	November 3, 1994	456656	23.5
During a citywide power outage, the gang hangs out at Monica and Rachel's apartment. Ross tries to share his feelings with Rachel, but a stray cat interrupts their conversation. Rachel and Phoebe search the building for the cat's owner, who is eventually revealed as their neighbor Paolo, a hunky but English-challenged Italian who Rachel falls for. Meanwhile, a nervous Chandler becomes trapped in an ATM vestibule with Victoria's Secret model Jill Goodacre. (This episode was part of "Blackout Thursday", in which NBC tied together three shows set in New York City and airing the same night, beginning with the Mad About You season 3 episode "Pandora's Box" which depicted the cause of the city-wide blackout, followed by this episode, and ending with an episode of the short-lived show Madman of the People. Seinfeld aired the same night but did not participate.)
8	8	"The One Where Nana Dies Twice"	James Burrows	Marta Kauffman & David Crane	November 10, 1994	456657	21.1
Ross and Monica rush to the hospital with their parents, Jack and Judy, when their elderly maternal grandmother, Nana, is taken ill. Nana dies, and Ross and Monica go in to say their goodbyes but are shocked when Nana momentarily revives before dying again. The gang all attend Nana's funeral, where Monica subtly confronts her mother about her constantly critical attitude. Ross, who fell into an open grave at the cemetery and hurt his back, becomes loopy on muscle relaxers, while Joey, Jack and other men at the funeral watching the Giants game on Joey's portable TV. Chandler is astounded when a work friend tries fixing him up with a male colleague and wants to find out why many people initially think he is gay.
9	9	"The One Where Underdog Gets Away"	James Burrows	Jeff Greenstein & Jeff Strauss	November 17, 1994	456659	23.1
As Thanksgiving nears, Rachel struggles to make enough tips to be able to pay for a plane ticket to take a skiing vacation with her family in Vail. The others chip in to help her pay for the ticket. Ross and Monica plan a quiet Thanksgiving feast at her apartment while their parents are away. Phoebe agrees to join because her grandmother celebrates Thanksgiving in December. Chandler, who hates Thanksgiving because his parents announced their divorce on that holiday, plans to stay home and eat grilled cheese sandwiches and tomato soup. Joey, who planned to go to his parents' house, is banned by his family because he unwittingly appeared on a public health poster that implies he has an STD. During the Thanksgiving parade, the Underdog balloon breaks free; the gang rushes to the roof to watch, but they get locked out of Monica's apartment. By the time they get back in, Thanksgiving dinner is burned, and Rachel has missed her flight, resulting in a brief argument. However, the friends reconcile after seeing their neighbor "Ugly Naked Guy" spending a romantic Thanksgiving with his girlfriend. Monica makes the tomato soup and grilled cheese for everyone, and Chandler muses that it has been nice for them to spend Thanksgiving together for a change.
10	10	"The One with the Monkey"	Peter Bonerz	Adam Chase & Ira Ungerleider	December 15, 1994	456661	19.9
The gang makes a pact not to bring dates to their New Year's Eve party, but everyone soon breaks it except Ross. While performing at Central Perk, Phoebe confronts some noisy scientists, then dates one of them, David (Hank Azaria), whom she brings to the party. Their relationship goes well until David and his research partner are offered a grant in Minsk, and he must choose to stay with Phoebe or go for career-making research. Monica invites "Fun" Bobby, who arrives unhappy because his grandfather just died. Joey is uncomfortable around his date Sandy's children, whom she brought to the party; she later ends up with David's friend. Rachel's plan to bring Paolo is derailed after he misses his flight from Italy; she returns from the airport disheveled and sporting a swollen lip after a fight with a woman over a cab. A desperate Chandler snaps and invites Janice before breaking up with her again after she mistakenly thinks he wants to get back together. Ross arrives with his new pet, a monkey named Marcel, who ignores Ross. In the end, everyone ends up without a date, accidentally fulfilling their original pact. When Chandler whines he has no one to kiss at midnight, Joey does the honors.
11	11	"The One with Mrs. Bing"	James Burrows	Alexa Junge	January 5, 1995	456660	26.6
Chandler's flamboyant romance-novelist mother, Nora Bing (Morgan Fairchild), visits. At dinner, Ross becomes upset over Rachel and Paolo's public displays of affection and gets very drunk. He is comforted by Nora, who offers sage advice, which leads to them kissing. Joey witnesses the kiss and later says that Ross has to tell Chandler. Chandler is upset with Ross but soon forgives him, and he confronts his mother about her behavior and other issues. Monica and Phoebe see an attractive guy on the street; when Monica shouts after him, the guy is hit by a car. While he is hospitalized in a coma, the girls take turns caring for him, which turns into something of a competition. When the guy wakes up, he blows them both off. Rachel, inspired by Nora, tries writing her own romance novel, with mixed results due to her substandard typing skills.
12	12	"The One with The Dozen Lasagnas"	Paul Lazarus	Jeffrey Astrof & Mike Sikowitz & Adam Chase & Ira Ungerleider	January 12, 1995	456658	24.0
Everyone except Ross knows the sex of his unborn baby; he wants to wait until it is born. Rachel breaks up with Paolo after he makes a pass at Phoebe at the massage parlor. Monica makes a dozen lasagnas for her aunt's party, only to discover she wanted them vegetarian. Ross consoles Rachel after her break-up, hoping this is his chance, but Rachel declares she is swearing off all men. Rachel accidentally lets it slip to Ross that he is having a son.
13	13	"The One with the Boobies"	Alan Myerson	Alexa Junge	January 19, 1995	456664	25.8
Joey hosts his father and learns that he has been having an affair; he is torn over whether to tell his mother but soon learns she already knows and wants everything to stay as it is. Chandler accidentally sees Rachel topless after her shower, and a chain reaction of nudity ensues when she tries to even the score by seeing him naked. She instead catches Joey naked, who then sees Monica unclothed, who accidentally surprises Joey's father in the shower. Everyone dislikes Phoebe's new boyfriend, an irritating psychiatrist named Roger (Fisher Stevens) who makes uncomfortably accurate assessments about the gang.
14	14	"The One with the Candy Hearts"	James Burrows	Bill Lawrence	February 9, 1995	456667	23.8
Ross has a Valentine's Day date with a beautiful neighbor, his first date in nine years. By chance, Carol and Susan, out on their own date, end up sitting nearby at the same restaurant. When Susan has to leave, Ross spends all his time talking to Carol; his neglected date leaves without his realizing it. He kisses Carol, who reminds him why they split and consoles him. Joey's date brings a blind date for Chandler, which turns out to be Janice; they end up sleeping together, then Chandler breaks up with her on Valentine's Day. Phoebe, Monica, and Rachel spend the holiday burning mementos of their past boyfriends, causing a fire and a visit from the fire department.
15	15	"The One with the Stoned Guy"	Alan Myerson	Jeff Greenstein & Jeff Strauss	February 16, 1995	456663	24.8
Monica cooks a gourmet meal for Steve (Jon Lovitz), a restaurateur looking for a new chef. He arrives stoned and wants to eat everything in sight, including taco shells and gummy bears. After working as a data processor for five years, Chandler gets promoted to supervisor, then quits, claiming he only intended for his job to be temporary; when his boss calls and offers him a raise, Chandler caves and goes back to work. Ross has a date with a beautiful colleague named Celia (Melora Hardin) and gives new meaning to the term "spanking the monkey" when she meets Marcel. Ross turns to Joey for advice when Celia wants him to talk dirty as foreplay.
16 17	16 17	"The One with Two Parts"	Michael Lembeck	Marta Kauffman & David Crane	February 23, 1995	456665 456666	26.1 30.5
Joey falls for Phoebe's identical twin sister, Ursula, making Phoebe feel neglected. Meanwhile, Chandler finds himself between a rock and a hard place when he has to fire an employee he is attracted to. Ross has doubts about parenthood when he attends Lamaze classes with Carol and Susan. Meanwhile, Monica is unable to fix her TV after Marcel puts it on the "SAP" function to Spanish. After weeks of procrastinating, Rachel finally takes down the Christmas lights on their balcony, only to fall off and sprain her ankle. At the hospital, Rachel, who has no health insurance, convinces Monica to trade identities with her so she can use Monica's coverage. The women meet two attractive doctors (George Clooney and Noah Wyle) and arrange a date, which requires them to maintain their switched identities. Ursula dumps Joey without actually telling him, so Phoebe pretends to be her so Joey will finally know. Ross doubts his ability to be a father, but after Marcel swallows Scrabble tiles and has to be taken to the hospital, Ross takes care of him, giving him confidence.: In addition to Lisa Kudrow appearing as Ursula, Leila Kenzle and Helen Hunt guest star as Fran Devanow and Jamie Buchman from Mad About You.; A repeat of Seinfeld originally aired between both parts of this two-part episode.
18	18	"The One with All the Poker"	James Burrows	Jeffrey Astrof & Mike Sikowitz	March 2, 1995	456662	30.4
Tired of her waitressing job, Rachel applies for positions in the fashion industry. She is excited to land an interview at Saks Fifth Avenue as an assistant buyer but does not get the job. Ross's normally docile demeanor disappears when the girls face the boys during a not-so-friendly poker game. Monica later seeks help from her aunt who is an expert player.
19	19	"The One Where the Monkey Gets Away"	Peter Bonerz	Jeffrey Astrof & Mike Sikowitz	March 9, 1995	456668	29.4
Rachel becomes depressed after learning that Barry and Mindy are engaged. The gang frantically searches for Marcel, who slipped out of the apartment while Rachel was watching him. Rachel, unaware Marcel is an illegal exotic pet, calls Animal Control, angering Ross. The animal control officer is Rachel and Monica's old high school classmate who has a long-standing grudge against Rachel, who has no memory of her. She refuses to release Marcel until Rachel threatens to report her for accidentally shooting Phoebe with a tranquilizer dart. Ross finds the courage to ask out Rachel, but Barry barges in to declare he still loves her.
20	20	"The One with the Evil Orthodontist"	Peter Bonerz	Doty Abrams	April 6, 1995	456669	30.0
Rachel and Barry secretly see each other, even though he is now engaged to Mindy, who asks Rachel to be her maid of honor. When Mindy admits she and Barry had an affair while Rachel was engaged to Barry, Rachel finally confesses to Mindy that she has been sleeping with Barry; the two women confront him, though Mindy decides to marry Barry anyway. Meanwhile, Chandler goes nuts when a woman he likes does not return his phone calls, later realizing there was a mix-up. The friends become annoyed after discovering someone across the street is spying on them.: First appearance of the "Rachel" haircut.
21	21	"The One with the Fake Monica"	Gail Mancuso	Adam Chase & Ira Ungerleider	April 27, 1995	456671	28.4
When Monica's identity is stolen, she, Phoebe, and Rachel decide to catch the imposter. Monica soon befriends the lively woman, who is later arrested anyway. Joey enlists his friends' help to come up with less Italian-sounding stage name, but Chandler suggests joke names that ruin his auditions. Marcel has reached sexual maturity, forcing Ross to realize he needs to be with other monkeys. Marcel is soon accepted at the San Diego Zoo, and the gang bid him goodbye at the airport.
22	22	"The One with the Ick Factor"	Robby Benson	Alexa Junge	May 4, 1995	456670	29.9
After losing his virginity to Monica, a young man Ethan (Stan Kirsch) reveals that he is not a college student, as she believed, but a high school senior. Phoebe temps as Chandler's secretary, and he discovers that no one at work likes him anymore now that he is the boss. Rachel has erotic dreams about Joey and Chandler, making Ross jealous. Rachel soon has a dream about Ross, but before Ross can tell Rachel he loves her, his beeper alerts him that Carol is in labor.
23	23	"The One with the Birth"	James Burrows	Story by : David Crane & Marta Kauffman; Teleplay by : Jeff Greenstein & Jeff Strauss	May 11, 1995	456672	28.7
Carol is in the hospital about to give birth, prompting Monica to think about having a baby. While Carol is in labor, Ross and Susan bicker over who gets to assist her more and about what to name the baby. Phoebe drags them into a janitor's closet to settle their differences, but they get locked inside. Rachel flirts with an OB/GYN doctor who suffers burnout from seeing female anatomy every day. Joey assists a single expectant mother (Leah Remini) in labor. Ross and Susan settle their differences and propose naming the baby Ben, derived from a janitor's uniform in the closet, which Carol agrees to. This episode was originally conceived as the season finale until James Burrows objected, saying that he "didn't want the show to be about a baby".
24	24	"The One Where Rachel Finds Out"	Kevin S. Bright	Chris Brown	May 18, 1995	456673	31.3
The museum sends Ross to China to procure a dinosaur bone, just before Rachel's birthday celebration. Chandler advises Ross to get over Rachel. Before leaving, Ross asks Chandler to give Rachel his present at the party. Joey's new girlfriend, Melanie (Corinne Bohrer) wants to sleep with him, but Joey's participation in a fertility study requires temporary celibacy. During Rachel's party, Chandler accidentally lets slip that Ross is in love with her, and a big decision presents itself.

== Home media ==
The first season was officially released on DVD in region 1 on April 30, 2002 by Warner Home Video, becoming available in both the United States and Canada as a 4-disc DVD Box Set. The release includes the extended versions of every episode with footage not seen on their original NBC broadcast. Additionally, each episode is updated with color correction and sound enhancement. Special Features include a commentary for the pilot episode with executive producers Kevin S. Bright, Marta Kaufmann and David Crane, a video guide to season one's guest stars, including George Clooney, Helen Hunt and Noah Wyle; an interactive map with inside stories from the crew, a trivia quiz and the trailer of Season Two DVD Release. For region 2, the release included the original NBC broadcast version of the episodes, and not the extended versions unlike the region 1 release.

The season also had an individual Blu-ray for region A on April 30, 2013, in this release the episodes are presented in their original NBC broadcast versions and does not include the extra deleted scenes and jokes that were included in the DVD version. Additional audio & subtitle tracks are also included with this release.

Friends: The Complete First Season
Set Details		Special Features
23 episodes (1 double-length episode); 4-disc set (DVD); 2-disc Set (Blu-ray); English (Dolby 5.0 Surround) (DVD); English (Dolby Digital 5.1) (Blu-ray); English, French, Spanish & Korean subtitles; Audio Commentary; 585 minutes (DVD); 544 minutes (Blu-ray)		Over 44 minutes of Never-Before-Seen footage included on every episode (DVD Only); Producers Commentary on the Pilot Episode; A Peek at Central Perk: Interactive Map (DVD Only) (Note: Not available on the 2019 re-release of the DVD's); Friends of Friends: Memorable Guest Star Moments; Trivia Quiz: "How Well Do You Know Your Friends?" (DVD Only) (Note: Not available on the 2019 re-release of the DVD's); Season Two Trailer
Release Dates
Region 1	Region 2	Region 4
April 30, 2002	May 29, 2000	October 4, 2006

== Reception ==
Collider ranked the season Number 9 on their ranking of all ten Friends seasons, and named "The One Where Rachel Finds Out" as its standout episode.
