= The One with the Prom Video =

- Friends episode
- Episode no.: Season 2 Episode 14
- Directed by: James Burrows
- Written by: Alexa Junge
- Production code: 457310
- Original air date: February 1, 1996

Guest appearances
- Elliott Gould as Jack Geller; Christina Pickles as Judy Geller; Patrick Kerr as The Restaurant Manager

Episode chronology
← Previous "The One After the Superbowl"	Next → "The One Where Ross and Rachel...You Know"
- Friends season 2

"The One with the Prom Video" is the fourteenth episode of the second season, and the 38th episode overall, of the American television situation comedy Friends, which first aired on NBC on February 1, 1996. The episode focuses on the main characters watching Monica (Courteney Cox) and Rachel (Jennifer Aniston) getting ready for their high-school prom in the titular video. A subplot sees Joey (Matt LeBlanc) having increased income, buying roommate Chandler (Matthew Perry) an unusual gift.

The episode was directed by James Burrows and written by Alexa Junge and features guest stars Elliott Gould and Christina Pickles as Jack and Judy Geller, Michael Ray Bower as Monica's date, and Patrick Kerr as the restaurant manager.

== Plot ==
Joey, earning substantial money after landing a role on Days of Our Lives, gives Chandler a gaudy gold bracelet as thanks for paying for head shots and food in the past. Chandler mocks it when it scares off a potential date, upsetting Joey when he overhears. Chandler promises to never take it off again but discovers it slipped off his wrist at some point and is missing. He buys a replacement, but the original is found by Rachel shortly afterwards at Central Perk. He gives one to Joey, repairing their friendship.

Monica struggles to find a job after being fired. After a disastrous restaurant interview where the manager has a food play fetish, she relents to Ross' prodding to ask for money from their parents Jack and Judy, who have visited the apartment to bring boxes of her possessions. Though Judy is disappointed she was fired, Jack encourages her to use her savings from her bank account and assures her that they will be there to lend money to her whenever she needs it. Despite this encouragement, Ross ends up writing her a check.

Ross continues to seek forgiveness from Rachel after insulting her, but she tells him that they as a couple will never happen. Whilst looking through the box her parents brought, Monica finds a video of her and Rachel getting ready for their senior prom. The friends decide to watch the video, although Ross objects to everyone seeing the tape. On the video, Rachel's date, Chip Matthews, has not arrived, and Monica refuses to go to the prom without her. Judy convinces Ross to wear Jack's tuxedo and take Rachel to the prom himself. Ross reluctantly agrees, but by the time he is dressed and ready to go, Chip has arrived and the girls leave. The video ends with Ross looking disappointed and dejected. Rachel, touched by Ross' gesture, gets up and passionately kisses him, forgiving him for what happened between them.

Monica later watches the video alone which features her and Jack dancing before the prom. It suddenly cuts to Jack and Judy making love in bed, which disgusts her.

== Production ==
Aniston, Cox and Schwimmer wore additional costumes and make-up for the prom video scenes.

The producers had kept Ross and Rachel from being together throughout the first season, eventually bringing them together in the second-season episode "The One Where Ross Finds Out", only to split them up in the following episode. Writer Alexa Junge incorporated many of her own experiences into the script, in particular Phoebe's line about Ross and Rachel being "lobsters", something Junge's husband once said. Aniston wore a false nose for the scenes in the video while Cox wore a "fat suit". While a previous episode had already established Monica as being overweight as a child, this was the first on-screen appearance of "Fat Monica" (the fat suit made frequent return appearances). Rachel's large nose was added because Junge believed that the characters "were so good-looking, you wanted to feel they had some realness in their past".

At first, Schwimmer did not want to wear the afro wig and mustache because he thought he would look like Gabe Kaplan in Welcome Back, Kotter (a similarity referenced in the episode). He relented because it enabled him to "tap into a part of himself that was very vulnerable and shy" and incorporate it into his performance. An early script draft featured a scene in the prom video in which an episode of All My Children is on in the background. The scene was intended to feature the character "Bryce", played by Gunther (as revealed in "The One Where Eddie Won't Go").

== Reception ==
In 1997, TV Guide ranked this episode number 100 on their list of the "100 Greatest Episodes of All Time".

"The One with the Prom Video" received acclaim from critics. Entertainment Weekly rates the episode "A", welcoming the return of Burrows as director and calling the prom video "witty character development disguised as a standard flashback." The authors of Friends like Us: The Unofficial Guide to Friends write that it is "a watershed in the history of the show" and "It's the sign of a good show that they can switch so effortlessly from comedy to pathos to romance in one short scene." Robert Bianco wrote in USA Today in 2004, "If any one outing can take credit for moving Friends from good to great, it's Prom Video" and describes the resolution as an "ingenious, unexpected twist."

The episode is popular among fans of the series. It appeared on one of the first region 1 "best of" DVD releases and is one of the two episodes to feature an audio commentary on the region 1 DVD release of the complete second season. In a poll conducted shortly before the series finale, "The One with the Prom Video" was voted the best episode of Friends, with 1.6 million people polling on the Internet. The episode is the favorite of Schwimmer, who liked the comedic and emotional origins of the Ross/Rachel relationship, as well as the exchange between Monica and Chandler as she defends her weight on the video.

In 2014, Gawker published a list of every episode of Friends ranked from No. 236 through No. 1. "The One With The Prom Video" was ranked as the No. 1 best episode on the list.
