= Patrick Kerr =

American television actor

Patrick Kerr (born January 23, 1956) is an American actor, most recently recurring as small town grocer "Mr. Johnson" on Apple TV's "The Big Door Prize" starring Chris O'Dowd.

== Career ==
Previously, he is best known for his recurring role as Noel Shempsky on Frasier. He previously recurred as Michael on Curb Your Enthusiasm as a blind pianist and acquaintance of Larry, and on Lifetime's Oh Baby, starring Cynthia Stevenson and Jessica Walter. His many other television appearances include among others, Friends, Seinfeld, Will and Grace, E.R., Law & Order, The Drew Carey Show, 3rd Rock from the Sun, and the Friends spin-off Joey. He also appeared in the Disney Channel's series Jessie as "Clement Brulee".

On Broadway, he appeared as Bennett in a revival of Tom Stoppard's Travesties directed by Patrick Marber. Other Broadway appearances include a revival of Terrence McNally's "The Ritz" directed by Joe Mantello and "You Can't Take It with You" starring James Earl Jones directed by Scott Ellis. Off-Broadway work include's the Paul Rudnick play "Jeffrey" and Sarah Ruhl's "Stage Kiss." He has toured with "My Fair Lady" and a sit down production of "The Lion King" in Las Vegas. In regional theater he has worked at The Guthrie, Yale Rep, The Mark Taper Forum, Berkeley Rep (Bay Area Critics Award for "Best Supporting Actor"), American Rep Theater, California Shakespeare Theater, South Coast Repertory, and others. In 2007, he appeared in the short films Random Acts of Kindness, Die Hardly Working, Anklebiters, Girl Trouble, Goldfish, Time Upon A Once, and The Losers which were produced during the reality show On the Lot. He has a MFA from the Yale School of Drama.

== Personal life ==
Kerr is gay.

== Filmography ==
=== Film ===
Year	Title	Role	Notes
1992	Vaudeville	Victor	
1995	Stuart Saves His Family	Makeover Artist	
1995	Jeffrey	Waiter / Actor / Policeman	
1996	Ed	Kirby	
1999	George Lucas in Love	Professor	Short
2002	Wrong Way to Sundance	Jenna's Assistant	
2005	Domino	DMV Manager	
2009	He Likes Guys	Larry	Segment "Waiting for Yvette"
2014	Friends and Romans	Mr. Rothman	
2015	Anesthesia	Jerry	

=== Television ===
Year	Title	Role	Notes
1993	Law & Order	Frank Durnan	Episode: "Benevolence"
1993	Loving	Harvey	Episode #1.2596
1994	Acapulco H.E.A.T.	Sergeant Saunders	Episode: "Code Name: Ghosts"
1994	The George Carlin Show	Mitchell	Episode: "George Destroys a Way of Life"
1994	Love & War	Moose	Episode: "The Great Escape"
1994–2004	Frasier	Noel Shempsky	22 episodes
1995	Star Trek: Voyager	Bothan	Episode: "Persistence of Vision"
1995	The Drew Carey Show	Johnson	2 episodes
1995–1996	The Home Court	Elephant Ed	2 episodes
1996	Friends	The Restaurant Manager	Episode: "The One with the Prom Video"
1996	The Parent 'Hood	Mr. Cumberpatch	Episode: "The Lost Weekend"
1996	Seinfeld	La Forge - Clerk	Episode: "The Bottle Deposit"
1996	Alien Nation: The Enemy Within	Pursuer #1	Television film
1997	The Wonderful World of Disney	Mr. Wood	Episode: "Toothless"
1997	Veronica's Closet	Todd	Episode: "Veronica's Christmas Song"
1997–1998	3rd Rock from the Sun	Irving	2 episodes
1998	The Brian Benben Show	Ned	Episode: "Brian's Got Back: Part 1"
1998–2000	Oh Baby	Brad	20 episodes
1999	Maggie Winters	Gil	Episode: "Sometimes You Feel Like a Nut"
2000	The David Cassidy Story	Magazine Photographer	Television film
2000–2001	The Norm Show	Mike	2 episodes
2000–2004	Curb Your Enthusiasm	Michael / Blind Man	4 episodes
2001	When Billie Beat Bobby	Rheo	Television film
2002	Will & Grace	Choral Director	Episode: "A Chorus Lie"
2002	The Parkers	Mr. Brooks	Episode: "Food Fiasco"
2003	Yes, Dear	Delivery Guy #1	Episode: "Trophy Husband"
2003	Sabrina the Teenage Witch	Doubt	Episode: "Soul Mates"
2003	Just Shoot Me!	Clark Finkel	Episode: "Rivals in Romance"
2003	The Brotherhood of Poland, New Hampshire	Hootie Howell	3 episodes
2003	It's All Relative	Ben	Episode: "Artistic Differences"
2004	ER	George Deakins	2 episodes
2005	Joey	The Producer	Episode: "Joey and the Wrong Name"
2006	Eve	Phillip	Episode: "Mo' Money, Mo' Problems"
2006	The New Adventures of Old Christine	Peter	Episode: "A Long Day's Journey Into Stan"
2006	Hannah Montana	Simon	Episode: "Grandmas Don't Let Your Babies Grow Up to Play Favorites"
2006	CSI: Crime Scene Investigation	Gregory Kimble	Episode: "Way to Go"
2007	Crossing Jordan	Conrad O'Dell	Episode: "Faith"
2007	On the Lot	Actor	Episode: "14 Cut to 13 & 13 Directors Compete"
2013	Jessie	Clement Brulee	Episode: "All the Knight Moves"
2013	Elementary	Simon	Episode: "Poison Pen"
2020	Little America	Frank	Episode: "The Baker"
2022	Search Party	Dr. Lombardo	Episode: "Genesis"
2023-2024	The Big Door Prize	Mr. Johnson	18 episodes
