= Alexa Junge =

American screenwriter

Alexa Junge is an American television writer, producer and screenwriter. Her work on Friends, from 1994 to 1999, earned her nominations for three Emmy Awards.

== Personal life ==
Junge grew up in Los Angeles and attended Barnard College, where she wrote for and performed in the Columbia University Varsity Show with David Rakoff and Jeanine Tesori. Junge continued her education at NYU's Tisch School of the Arts. A 2001 profile of Junge observed, "For someone who once moved to the East Coast to pursue theater writing, a career in television came as a bit of a surprise."

Junge is the granddaughter of screenwriter Marvin Borowsky and has one son, Henry Petrie.

== Career ==
Junge was a writer and producer for Friends from 1994 to 1999, for which she was nominated for three Emmy Awards and a Writers Guild of America Award.

Junge wrote the episode "The One Where Everybody Finds Out", which won the National AOL Poll for "All Time Favorite Friends Episode"

Her episode "The One with the Prom Video" was heralded by the authors of Friends like Us: The Unofficial Guide to Friends as "a watershed in the history of the show." In 2014, Gawker published a list of every episode of Friends ranked from #236 through #1. "The One With The Prom Video" came in first. It was 100 in the TV Guide's 100 Greatest Episodes of All-Time.

Junge went on to write for Once and Again, Sex and the City, The West Wing (for which she was nominated for one Emmy for production and one WGA Award) as well as Big Love and the BBC comedy Clone. Junge also wrote lyrics for Disney's Mulan 2 and the children's stage version Mulan Jr., as well as screenplay and lyrics for Disney's Lilo & Stitch 2: Stitch Has a Glitch.

A frequent contributor to National Public Radio's This American Life, Junge performed live for their 2008 "What I Learned From Television" tour. She served as executive producer and showrunner for the first season of Showtime's series The United States of Tara; upon her departure Hollywood Reporter noted, "Bringing Friends alumna Junge on board (had been) key to securing a series order for Tara, created by Oscar winner Diablo Cody." Junge subsequently worked on Tilda for HBO with Bill Condon, Alan Poul and John Hoffman, and was the executive producer on Best Friends Forever starring Lennon Parham and Jessica St. Clair for NBC. She also wrote four episodes of the 2015-16 Netflix series Grace and Frankie.

Junge's play Fingersmith (an adaptation of Sarah Waters' novel) had its world premiere at the Oregon Shakespeare Festival in March 2015. Additional plays and musicals by Junge were produced at the Goodspeed Opera House, Studio Arena Theater, Playwrights Horizons Lab, Theaterworks and developed at New York Stage and Film as well as the MacDowell and Djerassi colonies of Hedgebrook Women Playwrights Festival. Among these productions was the musical Starcrossed: The Trial of Galileo, for which Junge co-wrote the book and lyrics with Keith Levenson.

=== Television writing credits ===
==== Friends episodes ====
Junge has written the following Friends episodes:

- "The One Where Everybody Finds Out" (1999)
- "The One with the Yeti" (1998)
- "The One Where Chandler Can't Remember Which Sister" (1997)
- "The One with the Metaphorical Tunnel" (1996)
- "The One with the Two Parties" (1996)
- "The One with the Prom Video" (1996)
- "The One with Phoebe's Husband" (1995)
- "The One with the Ick Factor" (1995)
- "The One with the Boobies" (1995)
- "The One with Mrs. Bing" (1995)
- "The One with George Stephanopoulos" (1994)

==== The West Wing episodes ====
Junge has written the following The West Wing episodes:

- "Eppur Si Muove" (2004)
- "Disaster Relief" (2003)

==== The United States of Tara episodes ====
Junge has written the following The United States of Tara episodes:

- "Snow" (2009)
- "Revolution" (2009)
- "Inspiration" (2009)

==== Grace and Frankie episodes ====
Junge has written the following Grace and Frankie episodes:

- "The Floor" (2017)
- "The Party" (2016)
- "The Vitamix" (2016)
- "The Vows" (2015)
- "The Funeral" (2015)
