= Friends season 2 =

Season of television series

Friends
- Season 2
- Friends season 2 DVD cover
- Showrunners: David Crane; Marta Kauffman
- Starring: Jennifer Aniston; Courteney Cox; Lisa Kudrow; Matt LeBlanc; Matthew Perry; David Schwimmer
- No. of episodes: 24

Release
- Original network: NBC
- Original release: September 21, 1995 – May 16, 1996

Season chronology
- ← Previous; Season 1 Next → Season 3

The second season of the American television sitcom Friends aired on NBC from September 21, 1995 to May 16, 1996.

== Cast and characters ==
=== Main cast ===
- Jennifer Aniston as Rachel Green
- Courteney Cox as Monica Geller
- Lisa Kudrow as Phoebe Buffay
- Matt LeBlanc as Joey Tribbiani
- Matthew Perry as Chandler Bing
- David Schwimmer as Ross Geller

=== Recurring cast ===
- Lauren Tom as Julie
- Mike Hagerty as Mr. Treeger
- Tom Selleck as Richard Burke
- Jane Sibbett as Carol Willick
- Jessica Hecht as Susan Bunch
- June Gable as Estelle Leonard
- James Michael Tyler as Gunther
- Adam Goldberg as Eddie

=== Guest stars ===
- Audra Lindley as Frances (Phoebe's Grandmother)
- Maggie Wheeler as Janice Litman
- Cosimo Fusco as Paolo
- Marlo Thomas as Sandra Green
- Ron Leibman as Leonard Green
- Elliott Gould as Jack Geller
- Christina Pickles as Judy Geller
- Emily Procter as Annabel
- Joel Beeson as The Hombre Man (Todd)
- Steve Zahn as Duncan
- Brittney Powell as Jade
- Chris Young as Steven Fishman
- Max Wright as Terry
- Chrissie Hynde as Stephanie Schiffer
- Lea Thompson as Caroline Duffy (uncredited)
- Giovanni Ribisi as "condom boy" (uncredited)
- Arye Gross as Michael
- Michael McKean as Mr. Rastatter
- Vincent Ventresca as Fun Bobby
- Phil Leeds as Mr. Adelman
- Brooke Shields as Erika
- Chris Isaak as Rob Donnen
- Fred Willard as the zookeeper
- Dan Castellaneta as the zoo janitor
- Jean-Claude Van Damme as himself
- Julia Roberts as Susie Moss
- Charlie Sheen as Ryan
- Brian Posehn as the script messenger
- Mitchell Whitfield as Barry Farber
- Peter DeLuise as Carl
- Nicky Katt as Arthur
- Steve Park as Scott Alexander
- Dorien Wilson as Mr. Kogen

== Episodes ==
| No. overall | No. in season | Title | Directed by | Written by | Original release date | Prod. code | U.S. viewers (millions) | Rating (18–49) |
|---|---|---|---|---|---|---|---|---|
| 25 | 1 | "The One with Ross' New Girlfriend" | Michael Lembeck | Jeffrey Astrof & Mike Sikowitz | September 21, 1995 | 457301 | 32.1 | N/A |
At Rachel's birthday celebration, Chandler has accidentally revealed that Ross loves her. Rachel goes to the airport to meet Ross and tell him she cares for him, unaware he is returning with Julie (Lauren Tom), who he reconnected with in China and is now dating. Chandler then feels guilty for advising Ross to get over Rachel. When Phoebe gives Joey and Chandler haircuts, Monica wants one. Phoebe initially refuses, knowing Monica's obsessive perfectionism, but finally relents. She misunderstands Monica's wishes and gives her a haircut like Dudley Moore instead of Demi Moore. Joey sends Chandler to his tailor for a new suit, but while measuring his inseam, the man touches Chandler inappropriately. Chandler tells Joey who naively believes that is the normal procedure. Ross' constant talk about Julie upsets Rachel, who spends the night with her old lover, Paolo. Guest Stars: Cosimo Fusco as Paolo, Buck Kartalian as Frankie.
| 26 | 2 | "The One with the Breast Milk" | Michael Lembeck | Adam Chase & Ira Ungerleider | September 28, 1995 | 457302 | 29.8 | N/A |
The guys are uncomfortable by seeing Carol breastfeeding Ben. The situation is made worse by Joey and Phoebe tasting the milk. Rachel resents Monica's growing friendship with Julie, though Monica feels obligated to spend time with her brother's girlfriend. At his department store job, Joey competes with a fellow cologne spritzer for a beautiful colleague's (Emily Procter) affection.
| 27 | 3 | "The One Where Heckles Dies" | Kevin S. Bright | Michael Curtis & Gregory S. Malins | October 5, 1995 | 457303 | 30.2 | N/A |
When Chandler refuses to date a woman from work, claiming her nostrils are too big, the gang claim this is always his way to avoid serious relationships. Rachel and Monica's downstairs neighbour, Mr. Heckles, suddenly dies, leaving them all his belongings, which is nothing but junk that they have to dispose of. Ross and Phoebe argue over the theory of evolution. Chandler, noticing similarities between his life and Mr. Heckles', believes he will also die alone. Panicked, he calls Janice and arranges to meet her, only to be shocked when she shows up married and pregnant.
| 28 | 4 | "The One with Phoebe's Husband" | Gail Mancuso | Alexa Junge | October 12, 1995 | 457305 | 28.1 | N/A |
The gang is amazed that Phoebe has been secretly married to a gay Canadian ice dancer named Duncan (Steve Zahn). She married him so he could obtain a green card. Phoebe is excited when he wants to see her, then is crushed that he wants a divorce. Duncan says he realized he is not gay and wants to marry someone else. Interesting facts are revealed about the others: Joey starred in a porn film and Chandler has a third nipple. Ross seeks relationship advice from Rachel after revealing that he and Julie have not slept together yet. Rachel, wanting to keep them apart, advises they abstain, while Joey gives Ross the opposite advice.
| 29 | 5 | "The One with Five Steaks and an Eggplant" | Ellen Gittelsohn | Chris Brown | October 19, 1995 | 457304 | 28.3 | N/A |
When a sexy-sounding woman called Jade (Brittney Powell) calls the wrong number, Chandler seeks to exploit the situation, with ultimately embarrassing results. Income disparity issues divide the friends: the more affluent Ross, Chandler, and Monica versus the less-well-off Phoebe, Rachel, and Joey. Newly-promoted Monica is fired after accepting "gifts" from her restaurant's meat supplier, it being against restaurant policy regarding kickbacks. Monica, Ross, and Chandler see Hootie & the Blowfish for Ross's birthday.
| 30 | 6 | "The One with the Baby on the Bus" | Gail Mancuso | Betsy Borns | November 2, 1995 | 457306 | 30.2 | N/A |
When Monica rushes Ross to the emergency room after he suffers an allergic reaction to kiwis, Chandler and Joey babysit Ross' baby son, Ben. They use him as bait to attract girls, but women think they are a gay couple. After accidentally leaving Ben on a bus, they are unable to identify which of two babies is Ben at the city's lost & found. Phoebe loses her Central Perk gig to a professional performer (Chrissie Hynde), so she defiantly sings outside the café. Also, a stranger (Giovanni Ribisi), who accidentally dropped a condom in Phoebe's guitar case, rushes back to reclaim it for an "emergency." Catherine Bell appears as Robin, one of the girls in the bus. ● Giovanni Ribisi ends up playing Phoebe's half-brother Frank Buffay Jr. later in the season. Chrissie Hynde co-wrote the song "Smelly Cat".
| 31 | 7 | "The One Where Ross Finds Out" | Peter Bonerz | Michael Borkow | November 9, 1995 | 457307 | 30.5 | N/A |
Rachel goes on a date but after drinking too much wine, obsesses about Ross. Her date suggests she needs closure, so Rachel leaves a message on Ross' answering machine claiming she is "over" him. After hearing it the next morning, a stunned Ross wrestles with choosing her or Julie. Next, he visits a pet shop with Julie, where he shall choose between two cats Julie has shortlisted for him, a task that utterly overstrains him. Chandler gains a few pounds, so a depressed, out-of-work Monica volunteers to be his personal trainer, going overboard in the process. Phoebe takes Joey's advice when her new boyfriend is reluctant to sleep with her, only to have it backfire. Ross, upset and citing numerous reasons, tells Rachel it is too late for them to be together and he is staying with Julie. At the end of the episode, Ross goes to see Rachel at the coffee shop as she is closing up, and they passionately kiss.
| 32 | 8 | "The One with the List" | Mary Kay Place | David Crane & Marta Kauffman | November 16, 1995 | 457308 | 32.9 | N/A |
Ross struggles choosing between his childhood crush, Rachel, and his current girlfriend, Julie. Joey and Chandler suggest making a list of each girl's pros and cons. Ross chooses Rachel, ending it with Julie, though Rachel later finds the list, reading the negative comments. Hurt and angry, she breaks up with Ross. Monica is hired to create recipes using a vile-tasting synthetic chocolate called, Mockolate.
| 33 | 9 | "The One with Phoebe's Dad" | Kevin S. Bright | Jeffrey Astrof & Mike Sikowitz | December 14, 1995 | 457309 | 27.8 | N/A |
On Christmas, Monica, strapped for cash looks for tips from people using home-baked cookies, receiving mixed reactions. Phoebe discovers that the framed picture of her father that her grandmother (Audra Lindley) keeps in her apartment is actually the photo model. She tries locating her real father, then decides she is unready to meet him. Chandler and Joey delay Christmas shopping and end up scrounging gifts from a gas station. To win back Rachel, Ross asks her to make a list about him, and then feels offended when she calls him obsessive, among other things.
| 34 | 10 | "The One with Russ" | Thomas Schlamme | Ira Ungerleider | January 4, 1996 | 457311 | 32.2 | N/A |
Monica gets back together with Fun Bobby, who the other friends realize has a drinking problem. Monica persuades him to quit drinking, only to discover he is no longer fun. Joey lands the role of Dr. Drake Ramoray, a neurosurgeon on Days of Our Lives after refusing to sleep with the casting lady for a smaller role; she then offers him the bigger role of Ramoray, which he does sleep with her for. Rachel dates Russ, who bears an uncanny resemblance to Ross (both roles played by David Schwimmer). After finally realizing Russ is Ross's double, Rachel dumps him. At the end, Russ and Julie (Lauren Tom) meet and fall in love at first sight.
| 35 | 11 | "The One with the Lesbian Wedding" | Thomas Schlamme | Doty Abrams | January 18, 1996 | 457312 | 31.6 | N/A |
Carol and Susan hire Monica to cater their lesbian wedding, though the upcoming nuptials soon runs into a snag that Ross helps untangle. Phoebe believes she is possessed by an eighty-two-year-old client's spirit who died during a massage session. The woman's widower tells Phoebe that his late wife did not want to die until she saw "everything." Rachel is shocked and upset when she learns from her visiting mother (Marlo Thomas) that the latter intends to get a divorce.
| 36 | 12 | "The One After the Super Bowl" | Michael Lembeck | Jeffrey Astrof & Mike Sikowitz | January 28, 1996 (Note: These episodes originally aired as a single double-length episode but are sometimes split into two episodes for syndication, reruns and DVD presentation.) | 457313 | 52.9 | 28.2 |
| 37 | 13 | "The One After the Super Bowl" | Michael Lembeck | Michael Borkow | January 28, 1996 | 457314 | 52.9 | 28.2 |
Ross goes to visit Marcel while in California but the zoo says the monkey died. Ross soon learns Marcel is alive and working in commercials. Joey receives his first fan letter from a beautiful but crazed woman (Brooke Shields) who believes Days of Our Lives is real, a fact that does not prevent Joey from dating her. A man (Chris Isaak) invites Phoebe to sing for children at the library, but her morbid lyrics horrify parents. However, the kids like the songs for telling the truth and come to the café to listen to her. Rachel and Monica compete for Jean-Claude Van Damme after meeting him on a movie set that Marcel is in. Chandler runs into Susie, a former schoolmate (Julia Roberts), working on the film. She seems attracted to him, but is actually seeking revenge for Chandler once humiliated her back in the fourth grade. Joey is hired as an extra in the movie but overacts. Ross and Marcel spend time together.
| 38 | 14 | "The One with the Prom Video" | James Burrows | Alexa Junge | February 1, 1996 | 457310 | 33.6 | 16.8 |
After getting his big break with Days of Our Lives, Joey pays Chandler back with $812 and gives him an engraved gold bracelet that Chandler thinks makes him look gay. Joey's feelings are hurt when he overhears Chandler complaining about it. Also, an unemployed Monica is hard up for money. A home video from Monica and Rachel's prom night reveals that Monica was previously overweight and Rachel had a large nose. Rachel's date, Chip, seemed to have stood her up, so Ross donned his father's tuxedo to take her to the prom, though Chip showed up at the last minute without Rachel knowing what Ross did. Rachel, overwhelmed by Ross's gesture, kisses him. In 1997, TV Guide ranked this episode at No. 100 of its list of TV's 100 Greatest Episodes.
| 39 | 15 | "The One Where Ross and Rachel...You Know" | Michael Lembeck | Michael Curtis & Gregory S. Malins | February 8, 1996 | 457315 | 32.9 | 16.4 |
Joey buys a big screen TV and two leather recliners with his soap opera salary, turning him and Chandler into "couch potatoes" who spend days watching TV and never getting out of the chairs. Monica has a catering job for handsome Dr. Richard Burke (Tom Selleck), an ophthalmologist, who is an old family friend. He and Monica are mutually smitten and later go on a date. Ross and Rachel attempt to have their first real date, though Rachel has difficulty adapting to their new romantic relationship, breaking into giggles at inappropriate times. Just before their next date, Ross has a museum emergency, so Rachel tags along. They spend the night in a museum exhibit, waking up nude and under an animal skin, to visitors (mostly children) gawking at them. The episode introduces Tom Selleck in a recurring guest role that led to an Emmy Award nomination for Outstanding Guest Actor in a Comedy Series in 2000.
| 40 | 16 | "The One Where Joey Moves Out" | Michael Lembeck | Betsy Borns | February 15, 1996 | 457316 | 31.1 | 15.7 |
Now that he has a steady income, Joey thinks he should have his own apartment and moves out, upsetting Chandler. Monica struggles to tell her parents that she is dating Richard. Rachel and Phoebe want to get tattoos. Phoebe chickens out at the last minute, resulting in nothing more than a tiny blue dot, while Rachel gets a heart tattoo embedded on her butt-cheek. Ross changes his mind about tattoos altogether upon seeing Rachel’s tattoo and obviously turned on by it.
| 41 | 17 | "The One Where Eddie Moves In" | Michael Lembeck | Adam Chase | February 22, 1996 | 457317 | 30.2 | 15.0 |
A record producer discovers Phoebe and wants to make a music video out of her song "Smelly Cat". The producer secretly dubs a more talented (but less attractive) woman's voice over Phoebe's, though Phoebe initially believes she is the one singing. Ross's new relationship with Rachel causes friction with Monica who resents her brother being around all the time. Joey finds he does not like living alone and wants to move back in with Chandler. However, Chandler already has a new roommate, Eddie. Chandler soon realizes he does not really click with Eddie (who refuses to play foosball and dislikes Baywatch) like he did with Joey.
| 42 | 18 | "The One Where Dr. Ramoray Dies" | Michael Lembeck | Story by : Alexa Junge; Teleplay by : Michael Borkow | March 21, 1996 | 457318 | 30.1 | 14.5 |
Joey's good fortune comes crashing down when he foolishly claims in an interview for Soap Opera Digest that he writes all his own lines on Days of Our Lives, angering the script writer who then kills off Joey's character. Phoebe's attempt to help Chandler bond with his new roommate ends up revealing Eddie's quirky behavior. Sexual history dominates a discussion between two couples—Monica and Richard, and Ross and Rachel.
| 43 | 19 | "The One Where Eddie Won't Go" | Michael Lembeck | Michael Curtis & Gregory S. Malins | March 28, 1996 | 457319 | 31.2 | 16.1 |
Creeped out by his bizarre new roommate, Eddie, Chandler demands he move out. Eddie agrees, then does not even remember the conversation. Obviously deranged, he imagines that he and Chandler took a trip to Las Vegas that never occurred. Joey struggles dealing with losing his job on Days of Our Lives and the accompanying downfall in his lifestyle. He eventually moves back in with Chandler. In the process, they trick Eddie into thinking he has never lived in Chandler’s apartment before. Meanwhile, a new book on female empowerment inspires the girls to have a "goddess meeting", unleashing buried truths.
| 44 | 20 | "The One Where Old Yeller Dies" | Michael Lembeck | Story by : Michael Curtis & Gregory S. Malins; Teleplay by : Adam Chase | April 4, 1996 | 457320 | 27.4 | 13.8 |
Phoebe's positive outlook of the world is shattered when she learns how the movie, Old Yeller, really ends. She then starts watching all the films with melancholic endings that her mother used to forbid her from watching during her childhood and becomes seriously depressed, nitpicking over all the distressing details out of even the most cheerful films. Chandler and Joey have an extra ticket to a Knicks game, and Monica suggests they should take Richard along. Monica starts getting jealous when the three men constantly hang out soon after. Chandler and Joey regard Richard as the “cool dad” they never had, while Richard believed they were buddies. Meanwhile, Ross is disgruntled that he misses most of Ben’s firsts, so he decides to spend a whole weekend with his son in hope of eliciting more firsts out of him. In the process, Ross inadvertently reveals to Rachel that he has laid out a whole planned future for them, which greatly unsettles the latter.
| 45 | 21 | "The One with the Bullies" | Michael Lembeck | Brian Buckner & Sebastian Jones | April 25, 1996 | 457321 | 24.7 | 12.4 |
Ross and Chandler clash with two bullies at the coffee house over the couch where the gang usually hangs out, one of whom steals Chandler's hat. The bullies then eject Ross and Chandler from the coffee house for “hogging” the couch. Sick of drinking homemade “Kappucinos”, Ross and Chandler decide to stand up to the bullies. The four men are about to start fighting for the couch outside the coffee house when their personal items are stolen by some street burglars. They all eventually make amends to one another after working together to recover their items, though the bully who still wears Chandler’s hat refuses to return it. Monica, who only has $127 left, plays the stock market to avoid accepting a job offer at a tacky 1950s-themed diner known as Moondance Diner after going for the interview. She is eventually forced to work at the diner anyway after losing all her savings from unwise investments. The job requires Monica to wear a silly uniform and dance on the counter to old songs, much to her dismay. Meanwhile, Phoebe makes multiple attempts to visit her birth father, one of which ends up with her accidentally running over the family dog. When she finally musters up the courage to ring the doorbell and return the family dog, Phoebe instead meets her half-brother, Frank Buffay Jr. (Giovanni Ribisi) and learns that their father abandoned his second family four years earlier. Both Phoebe and Frank Jr. then decide to connect as siblings for the first time.
| 46 | 22 | "The One with the Two Parties" | Michael Lembeck | Alexa Junge | May 2, 1996 | 457322 | 25.5 | 12.2 |
Rachel comes back from her sister’s college graduation ceremony mad at her parents for ruining it with their incessant rampage about the divorce. Concerned that her parents would not get along during her birthday party as well, she contemplates not inviting them to the party at all, though Monica has invited Rachel's mother, Sandra. Things quickly go awry when Rachel’s father, Dr. Green, unexpectedly arrives at the party right before Sandra does, prompting the gang to set up an impromptu second party at Chandler’s and Joey's apartment to keep the hostile couple apart. The second party turns out to be more fun and livelier than what Monica has planned, which results in some guests (including Gunther) leaving for the second party with the help of Phoebe. The gang tries to segregate both Greens throughout the night, and Rachel alternates between the two parties. She ends up feeling depressed, lamenting about her unavoidable future without her parents being together in it. Chandler, having had the painful experience of his parents divorcing, then comforts her. Both Sandra and Dr. Green are successfully kept apart despite many close calls, with Joey kissing the former as the latter leaves at the end of the party.
| 47 | 23 | "The One with the Chicken Pox" | Michael Lembeck | Brown Mandell | May 9, 1996 | 457324 | 26.1 | 13.0 |
Phoebe catches chicken pox from Ross’s son just as her old flame, Ryan (Charlie Sheen), arrives in town on leave from the Navy. Even though he has never had chicken pox, he wants to be as close to her as possible and they end up spending the rest of the time being sick and trying not to scratch themselves. Chandler hires Joey as a temporary screener at his office and Joey decides to play it as a role. He creates his own character, "Joseph" (who has a wife and kids), and takes his roleplaying too far, which almost costs Chandler his job. Monica is upset that Richard does not have a "thing" – an unexplainable quirk – like she does. He eventually thinks of one to please her.
| 48 | 24 | "The One with Barry and Mindy's Wedding" | Michael Lembeck | Story by : Ira Ungerleider; Teleplay by : Brown Mandell | May 16, 1996 | 457323 | 29.0 | 13.9 |
Rachel agrees to be the maid-of-honor at her ex-fiancé's wedding, but a fashion faux pas draws much unwanted attention on her. This is made worse when she finds out that Barry has had slandered her for having syphilis and mental illness the day she runs out on their wedding in order to save his own ego. Ultimately, Ross comes to her defense and she stands up to Barry and the wedding guests. In the process, she also manages to overcome her fear of singing the Copacabana song from the eighth grade in public. To get a role in Warren Beatty's new movie, Joey must practice kissing guys. Neither Chandler nor Ross is willing to kiss him, though the latter ultimately decides to help out of guilt but Joey has gone for the audition earlier in the morning and does not get the role. Monica ponders her future with Richard - she wants to have children, but the latter does not due to old age and having had grandchildren. Unable to reconcile this difference, the couple reluctantly breaks up. Chandler falls for a mysterious internet woman who turns out to be his ex-girlfriend, Janice.

== Home media ==
The second season was officially released on DVD in region 1 on September 3, 2002 by Warner Home Video, as a 4-disc DVD Box Set. The release includes the extended versions of every episode with footage not seen on their original NBC broadcast. Special Features include 2 audio commentaries with executive producers Kevin S. Bright, Marta Kaufmann and David Crane, a video guide to season two's guest stars, an uncut version of Pheobe's "Smelly Cat" music video; an interactive map of Monica and Rachel's apartment with inside stories from the crew, a trivia quiz and video character bios. For region 2, the release included the original NBC broadcast version of the episodes, and not the extended versions unlike the region 1 release.

Along with the first season, Season Two also had an individual Blu-ray release for region A on April 30, 2013, in this release the episodes are presented in their original NBC broadcast versions and does not include the extra deleted scenes and jokes that were included in the DVD version. For unknown reasons, the 2 audio commentaries that were released with the DVD's were not included in the Blu-ray version, unlike the previous season Blu-ray release that did include the audio commentary on the pilot episode. Additional audio & subtitle tracks are also included with this release.

Friends: The Complete Second Season
| Set Details | | Special Features |
| 23 episodes (1 double-length episode); 4-disc set (DVD); 2-disc set (Blu-ray); English (Dolby 5.0 Surround); English (Dolby Digital 5.1); English, French & Spanish subtitles; Audio Commentaries; 566 minutes (DVD); 545 minutes (Blu-ray) | | Over 22 minutes of Never-Before-Seen footage included on every episode (DVD Only); Producers Commentary on 2 episodes: "The One with the List" and "The One with the Prom Video" (DVD Only); Open House at Monica and Rachel's Place: Interactive Map (Note: Not available on the 2019 re-release of the DVD's); Friends of Friends: Video Guest Book; Trivia Quiz: "How Well Do You Know Your Friends?" (Note: Not available on the 2019 re-release of the DVD's); The Never-Before-Seen Version of "Smelly Cat"; What's Up with Your Friends? Video Character Bios (Note: Not available on the 2019 re-release of the DVD's) |
Release Dates
| Region 1 | Region 2 | Region 4 |
| September 3, 2002 | May 29, 2000 | October 4, 2006 |

== Reception ==
Collider ranked the season Number 7 on their ranking of all ten Friends seasons, and named "The One with the Prom Video" as its standout episode.
