= Phoebe Buffay =

Fictional character from the American sitcom Friends

- Friends character
- Lisa Kudrow as Phoebe Buffay
- First appearance: "The Pilot" (1994)
- Last appearance: "The Last One" (2004)
- Created by: David Crane; Marta Kauffman; Kevin S. Bright
- Portrayed by: Lisa Kudrow

In-universe information
- Aliases: Phoebe Buffay-Hannigan; Regina Phalange; Princess Consuela "Valerie" Banana-Hammock
- Occupation: Massage therapist Musician; Secretary; Telemarketer
- Family: Frank Buffay Sr. (father); Phoebe Abbott (biological mother); Lily Buffay (adoptive mother); Ursula Buffay (twin sister); Frank Buffay Jr. (paternal half-brother); Alice Knight-Buffay (half-sister-in-law)
- Spouses: Duncan Sullivan (m. 1989; div. 1995) Mike Hannigan (m. 2004)
- Relatives: Frances (adoptive maternal grandmother); Frank Buffay III (half-nephew / surrogate son); Leslie Buffay (half-niece / surrogate daughter); Chandler Buffay (half-niece / surrogate daughter)
- Religion: New Age
- Nationality: American
- Birth date: February 16, 1966

Phoebe Buffay is one of the six main characters from the American television sitcom Friends. She was created by David Crane and Marta Kauffman and portrayed by actress Lisa Kudrow.

In the series' universe, Phoebe is the daughter of Frank and Lily Buffay. Her biological mother's name was Phoebe Abbott, whom she was named after. Phoebe has a twin sister, Ursula, a waitress who is also portrayed by Kudrow. Phoebe can speak several languages, including French and Italian. She appeared in all of the show's 236 episodes during its decade-long run, from its premiere on September 22, 1994, to its finale on May 6, 2004. She is a masseuse, notable for her offbeat and often unusual behavior. She was Monica Geller's roommate before Rachel Green, which is how she was introduced to the group. Phoebe is best friends with Monica and Rachel, along with their neighbors, Chandler Bing and Joey Tribbiani, and also Monica's brother Ross Geller. She plays acoustic guitar and sings simple, awkward songs at Central Perk, in addition to occasionally busking. During the show's ninth season, Phoebe is set up on a blind date with Mike Hannigan (played by actor Paul Rudd) and they marry in the final season.

Critical reception towards Phoebe remained consistently positive throughout Friends' decade-long run. Kudrow received critical acclaim for playing her character, including a Primetime Emmy Award, a Screen Actors Guild Award, a Satellite Award, an American Comedy Award and a TV Guide Award, as well as a Golden Globe Award nomination.

== Role ==
In the pilot episode, Phoebe is introduced as one of the six original friends, including her Greenwich Village Manhattan neighbors Joey (Matt LeBlanc) and Chandler (Matthew Perry), former roommate Monica (Courteney Cox), Rachel Green (Jennifer Aniston), and Monica's brother, Ross (David Schwimmer). She is a masseuse and part-time, aspiring folk-type musician, who plays a dreadnought style acoustic guitar and sings very awkward or absurd, self-composed songs. She has been shown busking in the subway, outside of the gang's usual "hang out" place, Central Perk, as well as at a public library, and has been seen frequently playing live sets inside the coffee shop. She had moved in with her maternal grandmother (Audra Lindley), upon moving out of Monica's apartment, approximately one year before the pilot episode, due to Monica's obsessive compulsive nature and anal-retentive cleaning habits. During the first season, she has myriad boyfriends, including Tony, a physicist named David, played by Hank Azaria, and a psychologist named Roger, played by Fisher Stevens. Phoebe works as a temporary secretary for Chandler for a brief period in "The One with the Big Ick Factor".

Phoebe's crass, identical twin sister, Ursula Buffay (also portrayed by Kudrow), a character created for and appearing in the American sitcom Mad About You as a waitress, is also introduced in the first season, in "The One with Two Parts Part 1". Phoebe is shown to have a very strained relationship with Ursula, who is one minute older than she and seems to care little about family affairs or Phoebe, Phoebe nearly always goes home empty-handed and none the wiser. When it is revealed Ursula performs in porn under Phoebe's name, Phoebe eventually finds some redemption by cashing in Ursula's pay slips. Phoebe's father, Frank Buffay (Bob Balaban), abandoned the family when Phoebe was a child, and the woman Phoebe believed was her mother, Lily Buffay, committed suicide when Phoebe was about 14, by means of carbon monoxide poisoning. However, Phoebe discovers she has a paternal half-brother Frank, Jr. (Giovanni Ribisi), and later meets her real mother Phoebe Abbott (Teri Garr), who had given her up for adoption when she and Ursula were born (with her, Frank, Sr. and Lily having been "kind of a couple").

In the second season episode, "The One with Phoebe's Husband", it is revealed that Phoebe was legally married to a "hoping to be gay" Canadian ice dancer, Duncan (Steve Zahn), for six years, to help him acquire his green card. The two divorce when he realizes that he is, in fact, heterosexual, and going to marry another woman. In "The One with the Baby on the Bus", Phoebe is temporarily replaced as the primary singer for Central Perk by a professional singer named Stephanie Schiffer, played by singer Chrissie Hynde. Phoebe's song "Smelly Cat" is introduced in the same episode. In "The One Where Eddie Moves In", a record company produces a full budget music video for the song, in which her voice is overdubbed by a much better singer; she turns down her record deal when she discovers the depth of the deception.

Although the facets of Phoebe's character are manifold and extremely complex, Phoebe can generally be classified as kind-hearted, but ditzy and whimsical. Due in no small part to her extremely traumatic childhood, Phoebe has developed a child-like naïveté in an attempt to shield herself from the world's evils. In addition to being a vegetarian and an avid tree hugger, she also displays a remarkable lack of experience with the "darker sides" of life. In "The One Where Old Yeller Dies", it is shown that her deceased mother Lily would turn off films before a tragic ending, including the death of Old Yeller or Bambi's mother being shot. It is also revealed that she was never told the truth about Santa Claus. This is made all the more prominent as one of the running jokes of the show is Phoebe's seemingly infinite criminal record. She repeatedly makes reference to her underworld connections and crimes committed while living "on the streets".

Much to the dismay of her friends (especially paleontologist Ross), Phoebe dabbles in trendy New Age ideas and superstitions throughout the series. She is convinced she can feel the presence of her dead grandmother in her old apartment, she senses the spirit of her mother in a lost cat, reads tea leaves, and dismisses Charles Darwin's theory of evolution as "too easy" in "The One Where Heckles Dies". Very in tune with her emotions and those of others, Phoebe sometimes serves as a rock to her friends. She especially shows a great deal of maternal instinct towards her younger brother Frank, despite the latter's lack of intelligence.

Similar to the short-lived Monica/Chandler/Richard love triangle, Phoebe had two serious romantic interests that overlapped with each other at one point during the series. Physicist David (Hank Azaria), has a romance with Phoebe in the first season of the series, but breaks her heart when he decides to leave for Minsk on a three-year research trip. He makes a few more appearances throughout the series, most notably shortly before her engagement to Mike (Paul Rudd). Mike was introduced early in the ninth season of the show, during a blind date with Joey, who finds Mike randomly at Central Perk. After a whirlwind romance, Phoebe and Mike break up after he says he never wants to marry again, and she briefly reunites with David. While on a trip to Barbados, both men propose to her, but she rejects David, realizing she is in love with Mike. She temporarily rejects Mike's proposal also, merely wanting an indication that their relationship is progressing. She ends up marrying Mike.

== Jokes and sarcasm ==
=== "Smelly Cat" ===
One of the show's running gags are Phoebe's absurd, folksy songs with awkward titles like "Pervert Parade", "Ode to A Pubic Hair", "You Suck", "Shut Up & Go Home", "Ballad of the Circumcised Man", "The Food Here Will Kill You", however Phoebe's magnum opus is undoubtedly "Smelly Cat", which she debuts in the episode titled "The One with the Baby on the Bus". The song is about a cat who is shunned by society because of its foul stench as a result of flatulence ("What are they feeding you?"). However, Phoebe empathizes with it, because she can relate to being outcast. The verses consist of Phoebe rattling off a list of ways in which the cat is disliked ("They won't take you to the vet", "you're obviously not their favorite pet", etc.) while the chorus ends with the uplifting message to anyone who is different or unique that it is "not your fault". In the episode, "The One Where Eddie Moves In," Phoebe is discovered by a record producer who wants to make a music video for "Smelly Cat". Phoebe is delighted with the result, at first naively failing to recognize that the voice in the video belongs to a far more talented singer. Ultimately, she philosophizes that the unrecognized singer is, metaphorically, Smelly Cat, denied deserving adoration for having the wrong "look". In the episode, "The One With Phoebe's Ex-Partner," Phoebe's former singing partner, Leslie, portrayed by E.G. Daily, wants to get back together. The partnership fails again when Leslie sells "Smelly Cat" to a commercial agency against Phoebe's wishes. Phoebe teaches the song to Chrissie Hynde, who releases it in a 1999 album. The credited songwriters include Adam Chase, Betsy Borns, Kudrow and Hynde. On August 26, 2015, Kudrow performed the song as a duet with Taylor Swift during Swift's concert in Los Angeles as a part of her 1989 World Tour.

=== Age ===
Her age seemed to have differed throughout the series. In "The One with the Mugging", it is implied that Phoebe is older than Ross, seeing as she was fourteen when he was 12. This implied that she was the oldest in the group. In season 4 episode "The One with the Jellyfish", Phoebe states that she is twenty-nine, placing her birth in approximately 1968. However, in "The One Where They're Going to Party", Ross states he is also 29 shortly after Chandler offered him a chocolate milk. According to "The One with Frank Jr." (season 3), Phoebe was born on February 16; however, in season 9 episode "The One with Phoebe's Birthday Dinner" Phoebe's birthday is sometime in early November, since they could not make the reservations and the dinner had to be moved back to October 31. In "The One Where They All Turn Thirty" (season 7), it is revealed that Phoebe was born a year earlier than she thought, believing she was 30 but was truly 31, which further adds to the inconsistency of her age throughout the show's run.

=== "Regina Phalange" ===
Phoebe occasionally uses the alter ego "Regina Phalange". The first reference to Regina Phalange is during season 5 following Ross saying "Rachel" instead of "Emily" at his wedding. She pretends to be "Doctor Phalange", Ross's brain doctor, claiming that names are interchangeable in his mind. When the friends go to Vegas, Phoebe introduces herself to the blackjack dealer as Regina Phalange. When Phoebe, Rachel, and Melissa go out to lunch (The One with Rachel's Big Kiss), and Melissa asks if she was in a sorority, she pretends to be a member of "Thigh Mega Tampon", a fictional sorority that was allegedly shut down when Regina Phalange died of alcohol poisoning. She also used her fake name to show Chandler and Monica how easily people lie about their names and to help Chandler with his interviewing skills in "The One with the Videotape", when she introduces herself as the pseudonym. In the season 10 episode "The One Where Joey Speaks French", Phoebe attempts to spare Joey from humiliation by introducing herself as "Régine Philange" and stating that Joey is speaking an obscure regional dialect from her "hometown" of "Estée Lauder". She immediately switches to French and claims that Joey is her younger brother who is "un peu retardé" (a little slow), and requesting that the casting director humor Joey's French-speaking abilities. The last reference is in the series finale when Phoebe successfully stalls Rachel's plane to Paris by saying there is a problem with the "left phalange".

== Production ==
Phoebe's pregnancy during Season 4 was to account for Lisa Kudrow's actual pregnancy.

=== Casting ===
Ellen DeGeneres, Kathy Griffin, Jane Lynch, and Megan Mullally all auditioned for the role of Phoebe. Lisa Kudrow won the role because the producers liked her recurring role as Ursula, the waitress in Mad About You.

== Reception ==
Kudrow received critical acclaim for playing her character, including a Primetime Emmy Award, a Screen Actors Guild Award, a Satellite Award, and an American Comedy Award, as well as a Golden Globe Award nomination.

Entertainment Weekly voted Phoebe Buffay on Friends as Lisa Kudrow's best performance.

Image noted five reasons why it claimed that Phoebe Buffay is the best character on friends:

- She sees the good in everything
- She is compassionate
- She is not afraid to be herself
- She is a devoted friend
- She is honest

However, certain articles describe the character in a more negative way. For example, according to an article written by Digital Spy Phoebe is described with frustration as "really grinding our gears".

According to Looper, Buffay is described as "especially polarizing" and "increasingly unlikeable as the series progresses".
