= Ross Geller =

Fictional character from the American sitcom Friends

- Friends character
- David Schwimmer as Ross Geller
- First appearance: "The Pilot" (1994)
- Last appearance: "The Last One" (2004)
- Created by: David Crane; Marta Kauffman
- Portrayed by: David Schwimmer; Edo Azran (young)

In-universe information
- Titles: Doctor of Philosophy; Professor
- Occupation: Paleontologist; Tenured college professor at New York University; Museum curator at the New York Museum of Natural History
- Family: Jack Geller (father); Judy Geller (mother); Monica Geller (sister); Althea (maternal grandmother)
- Spouses: Carol Willick (m. 1990; div. 1994); Emily Waltham (m. 1998; div. 1999); Rachel Green (m. 1999; div. 1999)
- Significant others: Rachel Green (girlfriend); Julie (ex-girlfriend); Mona (ex-girlfriend); Charlie Wheeler (ex-girlfriend); Elizabeth (ex-girlfriend)
- Children: Ben Geller (b. 1995); Emma Geller-Green (b. 2002)
- Relatives: Chandler Bing (brother-in-law); Leonard Green (father-in-law); Sandra Green (mother-in-law); Jack Bing (nephew); Erica Bing (niece); Sylvia Geller (paternal aunt); Iris Geller (paternal aunt); Millie Geller (paternal aunt); Cassie Geller (cousin); Nathan (uncle); Phyllis (maternal aunt); Lillian (maternal aunt); Cheryl (aunt); Freddie (uncle); Lisa (aunt); Marilyn (aunt); Dan (uncle); Murray (uncle); Ed (uncle)
- Religion: Cultural Judaism
- Nationality: American
- Birth date: October 18, 1967

Ross Geller is one of the six main characters of the NBC sitcom Friends, portrayed by David Schwimmer. Ross is considered by many to be the most intelligent member of the group and is noted for his goofy but lovable demeanor. His relationship with Rachel Green was included in TV Guide's list of the best TV couples of all time, as well as Entertainment Weekly's "30 Best 'Will They/Won't They?' TV Couples". Kevin Bright, who was one of the executive producers of the show, had worked with Schwimmer before, so the writers were already developing Ross's character in Schwimmer's voice. Hence, Schwimmer was the first person to be cast on the show.

== Appearances ==
Ross is a paleontologist and has a Ph.D. His romantic feelings toward Rachel Green (Jennifer Aniston), which began as a high-school infatuation, are an ongoing theme of his narrative arc. Likewise, their on-again, off-again romantic relationship is a nearly constant theme of Friends.

Raised on Long Island, Ross is the elder brother of Monica Geller (Courteney Cox), and son of Jack (Elliott Gould) and Judy Geller (Christina Pickles). Ross and Monica are Jewish and see themselves as at least cultural Jews, with Ross taking a more active role in wanting to teach his son, Ben (Cole Sprouse), about the faith. Ross gets divorced and is newly single in the first episode because his wife, Carol (Jane Sibbett), has realized she's a lesbian. Later in the series, he dates Rachel, but they split up when he sleeps with another woman the night they decide their relationship is "on a break". After his relationship with Rachel ends, Ross marries Emily Waltham (Helen Baxendale), the niece of Rachel's boss. However, because Ross says "I, Ross, take thee, Rachel" instead of Emily during the nuptials, the marriage doesn't last long. In season 5, Ross and Rachel drunkenly marry in Las Vegas, and ultimately that marriage results in a divorce as well; however, they confess that if they ever got married properly it would be the one that lasted. Throughout the series, Ross gets divorced three times. In the first episode of Joey, the spin-off series, it is hinted that Ross and Rachel may have gotten married again, as Joey Tribbiani (Matt LeBlanc) tells his sister Gina (Drea de Matteo) that all of his friends "got married."

A running theme in Ross's narrative is his competition with Monica, manifested through wrestling and paranoia. As children, they took part in a family football game for the "Geller Cup" every Thanksgiving. This tradition ended in its sixth year after Monica "accidentally" broke Ross's nose. The siblings came up with a dance in primary school called "The Routine", which they performed as adults at Dick Clark's New Year's Rockin' Eve in a New Year's Eve TV broadcast. When they were children, Monica felt that their parents favored Ross, but as they grew up, she actually liked Ross as a person and loved him more than simply out of a sense of family obligation. As adults, they became close, though the competition between them was still visible, as seen in the season three episode, "The One with the Football".

Ross often comes into conflict with Phoebe Buffay (Lisa Kudrow). His rationality and Phoebe's eccentricity lead to conflict over evolution, gravity, and whether Phoebe's mother was reincarnated as a cat. It is also revealed that Phoebe once mugged Ross (stealing a copy of the comic book Science Boy that Ross had created) when they were teenagers. The two are roommates for a few weeks when a fire forces Phoebe to move out of her apartment. She first moves into Chandler Bing (Matthew Perry) and Monica's apartment but then decides she wants to give the newly engaged couple some privacy, so she moves in with Ross. In a "flashback" episode, they are alone at a bar and start kissing, but the moment quickly passes when Ross keeps bumping his head. Phoebe also helps Ross on numerous occasions, ultimately making him realize that he loves Rachel and they are meant to be together.

Since college, Ross's best friend has been Chandler Bing. In college, they were in a band called Way/No Way, and Ross blamed Chandler when he was caught smoking marijuana. They become brothers-in-law after Chandler married Monica. Though they are best friends, at times Chandler gets annoyed with Ross's geeky behavior.

Ross is friends with Rachel Green, whom he has had a crush on since high school. Rachel viewed Ross as ‘Monica’s geeky older brother’ during high school. During the first episode of the series, when they meet after years apart, he rediscovers his feelings for her. They become close and have an on-and-off romantic relationship through the series. In the final season of the show, Rachel tells him that he means more to her than any other member of their group.

Ross is also close friends with Joey Tribbiani and helps him with auditions. He kisses Joey once in order to help him practice a role as a gay man, only to find out that Joey had already done the audition and didn't get the part. Joey and Ross also briefly try to cut Chandler out of their friend group after Chandler ignores them. They once fall asleep together on the couch after watching Die Hard. Toward the end of the series, however, Ross and Joey become closer friends, often hanging out together after Chandler gets married.

Ross often tries to bring out the best in his friends in difficult situations. For instance, in season 2, he encourages Joey to audition for Another World after being fired from Days of Our Lives despite Joey's refusal to audition for a two-line part of a secondary character. In season 7, he buys Phoebe the bicycle of her dreams but threatens to take it away from her because of her reluctance to learn how to ride it. Also, when he discovers that Joey has a crush on Rachel, he tells him to go for it, even though he finds it difficult to accept the idea of Joey and Rachel being together. Over all, Ross is portrayed as a very sweet, loving, and adorable character who is always looking out for everyone's best interests, and he is often the most mature compared to the rest of the gang (despite his ego, outbursts, and paranoia).

He has two children:

- Ross's son, Ben [Geller-Willick-Bunch], was conceived while Ross and Carol were still married and born at the end of Season 1. Ross shares joint custody of Ben with his ex-wife Carol and her wife Susan (Jessica Hecht). Ben appeared in a total of 24 episodes (25 including uncut episodes) and was played chronologically as follows: as an infant by Michael Gunderson in Seasons 1 & 2, by brothers Charles Thomas Allen and John Christopher Allen from Seasons 3 to 5, and by Cole Sprouse from Seasons 6 to 8.
- Ross' daughter with Rachel, Emma Geller-Green, was born at the end of Season 8. Rachel's pregnancy was revealed in the season finale of Season 7. The conception of Emma was the result of a one-night stand, which was later revealed in the Season 8 episode, "The One With The Videotape".

Ross claims to have "given up a career in basketball" to become a paleontologist and claims that the ideas for Jurassic Park and Die Hard were stolen from him. He also had a major interest in music, playing the keyboard for hours in the basement of their house in Long Island. Ross also claims credit for the Got Milk? slogan.

Ross had a pet in the first season of the show: a white-headed capuchin monkey named Marcel (although the monkey used in the series was a female called Katie).

== Relationships ==
Over the course of the show, Ross dates a considerable number of women. He is married three times and divorced three times. His proclivity to marry and divorce is a running gag within the series.

- Julie: An old graduate school colleague, portrayed by Lauren Tom. She first appears in the final scene of the Season 1 finale, returning with Ross from an archeological dig in China. They start dating in Season 2 but break up after Ross discovers Rachel's feelings for him and decides he wants to be with her instead. It is heavily implied that she starts a relationship with Russ, an ex-boyfriend of Rachel's with an uncanny resemblance to Ross.
- Bonnie: A love interest (played by Christine Taylor) introduced to Ross by Phoebe. Bonnie is formerly a militant bald woman who no longer shaves her head. She enjoyed a sex-filled relationship with Ross until a conniving Rachel broke them up by first encouraging Bonnie to shave her head again, which she knows will bother Ross, and later by revealing she was interested in reuniting with Ross.
- Mona: A love interest he met at Monica and Chandler's wedding (portrayed by Bonnie Somerville). Ross becomes paranoid after Mona proposes to send out Christmas cards together, and in a panic decides to give her a key to his apartment. It is later revealed that Mona is unable to say "I love you" yet, and delivers what the female friends refer to as "an emotional slap in the face" with "I love spending time with you". The relationship ends when Mona discovers that Rachel is living in Ross's apartment after Ross neglects to tell her this himself. When he hides in her apartment to retrieve his shirt while she is on a date with another man, Mona, under the belief that Ross wants to win her back, admits she still has feelings for him but states that they both need to move on.
- Chloe: Ross's only connection with Chloe (referred to in a few prior episodes as "the cute girl from the copy place with the belly button ring") was a one-night stand during a break in his relationship with Rachel, which interferes with their attempt to get back together. Although only covered over two episodes in Season 3, Ross' fling with Chloe would be the basis of the "We were on a break!" running joke that would last until the very end of the series.
- Janice: Ross has a brief fling with Janice, Chandler's ex-girlfriend, in Season 5. Phoebe said they would have very hairy children. Janice ironically dumps Ross because he whines too much. Ross, worried about how his friend would react, tells Chandler, who laughs but chooses to forgive him.
- Elizabeth Stevens (Alexandra Holden): A pretty 20-year-old student who Ross teaches during his first year as a professor. The two go through a tremendous amount of effort to keep their relationship a secret from the faculty, as Ross would get fired for dating a student. He even tries to get on good terms with Elizabeth's father Paul (Bruce Willis), who in turn threatens to report him to the university. Ross eventually manages to blackmail Paul into pretending to like him by threatening to reveal Paul's embarrassing mirror dance routine to Rachel (who dates him briefly). Despite Paul no longer being a threat, Ross eventually realizes he sees no future in his relationship with Elizabeth and decides to break up with her due to her immaturity.
- Charlie Wheeler: Ross meets Charlie (Aisha Tyler) in "The One With The Soap Opera Party". She is a paleontologist who has recently joined Ross's department. She initially dates Joey but breaks up with him and gravitates toward Ross, after realizing she has more in common with Ross. She eventually reconciles with her ex-boyfriend and breaks up with Ross.
- Cheryl (Rebecca Romijn): A very attractive woman that Ross briefly dates. He decides he wants to pursue a relationship with her but is stifled by her incredibly filthy apartment. Despite her own living quarters being littered with garbage and infested with a variety of pests, she can't stand the "weird smell" of Ross' apartment, which is why she doesn't like being there. Ross breaks off the relationship after being covered in trash in an attempt to make out with Cheryl. Monica later visits her and offers to clean her apartment, revealing she "couldn't sleep" after Ross told her about it.
- Jill Green: Ross very briefly dates Rachel's spoiled younger sister Jill (played by Reese Witherspoon) after her father sends her to New York City to take lessons from Rachel in self-sufficiency. Although Jill actually finds Ross a geek, she dates him out of spite because Rachel is uncomfortable with it and tells her "she's always wanted what she couldn't have". Ross, upon realizing he is being used, breaks it off with Jill because he does not want to end any possibility there could be of him and Rachel getting back together.

=== Rachel Green ===
Rachel is Ross's most significant relationship during the series and briefly his wife. His attraction to her is established early on; Ross met Rachel through his sister Monica, who was Rachel's best friend in high school. He developed an unrequited crush on her but never followed through on it. After leaving college, Ross married Carol, whom he had met in college, and had seemingly put his feelings for Rachel aside before he met her again in "The Pilot".

They have an on-again, off-again dynamic throughout most of the show.

In the Season 1 finale, Ross has to go to China for his work so he asks Chandler to give Rachel the birthday present which he had bought for her. Chandler gives the present to Rachel during her birthday celebration while Ross is in China, but he also accidentally reveals Ross's feelings for Rachel. This prompts Rachel to panic and start thinking about Ross in a romantic way. After Ross arrives back from China, Rachel goes to the airport to meet him after realizing that she likes him, but she sees him with Julie and reluctantly backs off.

In the Season 2 episode "The One Where Ross Finds Out", Rachel is on a date with a guy when she drunkenly calls and confesses to Ross that she had feelings for him, but now she is over him. Ross hears this message the next day at Monica's apartment with Rachel begging him not to check his messages. Later, in the same episode, they share a passionate kiss at the doors of Central Perk. Ross breaks up with Julie to be with her, but Rachel decides she does not want to be with him after finding out that he had made a list, at Chandler's insistence, comparing the good and bad qualities of her and Julie. In the later episode "The One with the Prom Video", it is revealed that Ross, despite being two years senior to Rachel, had decided to take her to her and Monica's prom, as Rachel's date had not arrived, only to be left disappointed as her date finally shows up and they all leave for the prom. Touched by this, Rachel kisses Ross, and the two begin dating.

However, they take a break from their relationship on their one-year anniversary after Rachel's overtime work and her growing friendship with Mark (the man who got her the job) prevents them from spending time together. That same night, after a misunderstanding where Ross hears Mark in Rachel's apartment over the phone, Ross believes that she has left him for Mark, becomes depressed and has a one-night stand with Chloe, which causes Rachel to officially end their relationship. They get together again at the end of Season 3 but again break up at the start of Season 4. Some of the later episodes show them to still be in love with each other, such as when Ross cancels his Discovery channel appearance to be with Rachel when she breaks her rib, or when Rachel flies to London to tell Ross before his wedding to Emily that she is still in love with him, only to realize that it would be better not to tell. Ross, however, accidentally says Rachel's name at the altar, and the marriage soon dissolves.

In the Season 5 finale "The One in Vegas", Ross and Rachel marry each other after getting drunk in Las Vegas. This marriage ends in a divorce after a failed application for an annulment; the two sadly admit that they thought if they ever married each other it would last.

In the seventh season premiere "The One with Monica's Thunder", after the news of Monica and Chandler's engagement, a passionate moment between them leads to Ross and Rachel kissing. Monica is hurt by this as she believed that Rachel was trying to “steal her thunder”. The kiss is later revealed to have happened because Rachel is upset that she is “not even close” to being engaged.

At the end of Season 7 at Monica and Chandler's wedding, it is revealed that Rachel is pregnant. The father is revealed to be Ross in the second episode of Season 8, and Rachel tells him in the next episode. They decide to have the baby, but the two do not resume their romantic relationship. In the middle of the season, Joey asks Rachel to move in with Ross so Ross can be more involved with her pregnancy. In the Season 8 finale, Ross and Rachel's daughter is born and named Emma Geller-Green. Rachel soon moves out of Ross's apartment in the middle of Season 9 when she realizes their platonic situation is not working.

In the final episode of the show, when Rachel is moving to Paris for her job with a new fashion brand, Ross tells her at the airport that he loves her and asks not to leave. Rachel initially does not respond to his feelings, but when the plane is about to take off, she realizes that she loves him too and gets off the plane. They profess their love for each other and decide to be together once and for all.

In the first episode of the spin-off/sequel series Joey, it is hinted at that Ross and Rachel were remarried shortly after the events of Season 10 as Joey tells his sister Gina that all of his friends are married. In the fifteenth episode, Ross is mentioned, though not by name. Joey tells his sister Gina that he confessed his love to Rachel but she was pregnant with Ross's baby and eventually ended up with him; this is the reason why Joey becomes reluctant to confess the same feelings to his girlfriend, Sarah.

=== Carol Willick ===
Carol (Anita Barone for the pilot episode, Jane Sibbett thereafter) is Ross's first wife and the mother of his son Ben. In the very first episode, Carol has just moved out of their apartment after coming out of the closet as a lesbian and leaving Ross for a woman named Susan Bunch, whom she later marries.

In the early days, however, Ross and Carol seemed to have had a very passionate relationship. Carol is the only woman he's ever had sex with (and hence lost his virginity to) at the start of the series. It is also revealed they shared a steamy session at Disneyland behind the "Dutch children" in It's a Small World, which got them a lifetime ban from the theme park. In the third-season episode, "The One with the Flashback", it is revealed that Carol met Susan at her gym, and it is implied that they had a short affair before Carol could no longer bring herself to cheat on Ross, who innocently believed they were just friends, and told him the truth.

Ross maintains a fairly healthy relationship with Carol after their divorce, and both decide to raise Ben together through shared parenting; but he doesn't hide his contempt for Susan as she "destroyed their marriage" and initially wanted to keep him out of Ben's life, having once told him that the baby was not his and would not have the surname "Geller". He briefly considers getting back together with Carol and they even share a kiss at a sushi restaurant, but Carol makes it clear that she can't reciprocate his feelings and has chosen to be with Susan. In the second season, Carol and Susan briefly call off their wedding due to Carol's homophobic parents' refusal to bless their relationship. Ross gives Carol away at the wedding and shares a dance with Susan, who develops a newfound respect for him.

In the alternate timeline episode "The One That Could Have Been" (Season 6), Carol and Susan are portrayed in a far more negative light. Exploring what could have happened if Ross and Carol never got divorced, it is revealed that they have been on a sexual dry spell that has lasted for months. During ideas to improve their sex life, Carol suddenly becomes very excited when Ross proposes that they have a threesome with another woman. Picking Susan, whom she met at her gym just like in the real timeline, the two women immediately proceed to have sex without Ross right in front of him, seemingly indifferent to his feelings. Ross later explains to Joey that he felt like a third wheel, trying to be involved while Susan kept kicking him away, and ended up being so bored he made himself a sandwich. Ross realizes his wife is a lesbian when Rachel states outright that Carol "sounds gay."

=== Emily Waltham ===
During the fourth season, Ross meets and falls in love with Emily Waltham (Helen Baxendale), an English woman who is set up with Ross by Rachel. Six weeks into their relationship, Ross asks Emily to move in with him. This escalates into a marriage proposal. The two plan a wedding in London, to which Rachel is invited.

During the ceremony, Ross, upon seeing Rachel, has a slip of the tongue and says Rachel's name instead of Emily's during his vows. Emily is furious and leaves the wedding. She later decides to forgive Ross, and reaches the airport in time to leave for their honeymoon, but is upset when she sees Ross and Rachel boarding the plane together. Ross, having given up on meeting Emily at the airport, invited Rachel on their honeymoon as a friend. Emily flees again. She later calls Ross only to tell him that he has to stop calling and harassing her relatives, but Ross makes her reveal her love for him. She says that she will return only if Ross stops being friends with Rachel. Unable to do so, Ross ends his marriage with Emily.

Shortly before Emily gets remarried to another man, she gets cold feet and leaves a message on Ross's answering machine asking whether their divorce was a mistake. Rachel accidentally deletes Emily's message. Despite Monica pleading with her to keep Ross in the dark about it, Rachel tells him that Emily called, as she believes he should be in charge of his own happiness. When he starts to doubt whether or not he should return Emily's call, however, Rachel convinces him not to.

== Reception ==
Ross Geller has become a well-known figure in pop culture, particularly due to his relationship with Rachel Green, his neurotic nature, and his love for dinosaurs.

In 2015, a play titled Ross & Rachel debuted at the Edinburgh Fringe Festival.

In October 2016, Ross Geller was voted "the Best Friends Character" in an international poll held by Comedy Central, during six weeks of "FriendsFest" on the channel.

== See also ==
- List of Friends and Joey characters
