= Monica Geller =

Fictional character from the American sitcom Friends

- Friends character
- Courteney Cox as Monica Geller
- First appearance: "The Pilot" (1994)
- Last appearance: "The Last One" (2004)
- Created by: David Crane; Marta Kauffman
- Portrayed by: Courteney Cox; Sierra Dawn Hill (young)

In-universe information
- Full name: Monica E. Geller
- Occupation: Chef at Iridium (seasons 1–2); Waitress at Moondance Diner (seasons 2–3); Head chef at Alessandro's (seasons 4–9); Head chef at Javu (seasons 9–10)
- Family: Jack Geller (father); Judy Geller (mother); Ross Geller (brother); Althea (maternal grandmother)
- Spouse: Chandler Bing (m. 2001)
- Significant others: Richard Burke (ex-boyfriend); Pete Becker (ex-boyfriend)
- Children: Jack Bing (b. 2004); Erica Bing (b. 2004)
- Relatives: Ben Geller (nephew); Emma Geller-Green (niece); Rachel Green (sister-in-law); Sylvia Geller (paternal aunt); Iris Geller (paternal aunt); Cassie Geller (cousin); Nathan (cousin); Phyllis (maternal aunt); Lillian (maternal aunt); Cheryl (aunt); Freddie (uncle); Marilyn (aunt); Frannie (cousin)
- Religion: Cultural Judaism
- Nationality: American
- Birth date: April 19, 1969

Monica E. Geller is a fictional character, one of the six main characters who appears on the American sitcom Friends (1994–2004). Created by David Crane and Marta Kauffman, and portrayed by actress Courteney Cox, Monica appears in all of the show's 236 episodes, from its premiere in 1994, to its finale in 2004. A chef known for her cleanliness, competitiveness and obsessive–compulsive nature, Monica is the younger sister of Ross Geller and best friend of Rachel Green, the latter of whom she invites to live with her after Rachel forsakes her own wedding. The two characters spend several years living together as roommates until Monica begins a romantic relationship with long-time neighbor and friend Chandler Bing, whom she marries. Unable to conceive children on their own, Chandler and Monica eventually adopt twins Erica and Jack and move out of their apartment into a larger house in the suburbs.

The creators' first choice for the role of Monica was comedienne Janeane Garofalo. Cox had been offered the role of Rachel but declined in favor of playing the character's best friend Monica because she was drawn to her strong personality. Meanwhile, the role of Rachel went to actress Jennifer Aniston. Before Friends aired, Monica's characterization was greatly debated among writers in regards to the character sleeping with someone on their first date during the pilot. Kauffman in particular greatly defended Monica, arguing with NBC executive Don Ohlmeyer over whether or not this would make the character too promiscuous. Ultimately, the episode aired unchanged after the studio surveyed the audience, the results of which returned in favor of Monica's existing storyline. The character's struggles with childhood obesity, challenges with romantic relationships and complicated relationship with her mother would eventually become popular staples of the show.

Several months before Friends premiered, NBC had conducted a research report, the results of which determined that Monica was the only character to have been remotely well received by test audiences. When Friends first aired, critics initially perceived Monica – who was immediately established as the show's "mother hen" – and Cox as the series' main character and star, respectively. Critics have been largely receptive towards both Cox and her character; the Los Angeles Times holds Cox's acting responsible for disproving the stigma that attractive women are incapable of delivering comedic performances. Revered as a television icon, Monica Geller famously addressed several topics that were rarely discussed in prime time television at the time, including safe sex, casual sex, and age disparity in relationships and was well known for being a popular fashion icon of the 1990s.

== Characterization ==
A hardworking chef Monica is introduced in the pilot as one of five close-knit friends who live in New York City, including her older brother Ross (David Schwimmer), neighbors Joey (Matt LeBlanc) and Chandler (Matthew Perry), and former roommate Phoebe (Lisa Kudrow). When her privileged, inexperienced childhood best friend Rachel (Jennifer Aniston), with whom she had long lost contact, suddenly arrives in her neighborhood unannounced as a runaway bride after abandoning her own wedding, Monica allows her to move in with her while she attempts to reorganize her life, and the two reconnect.

Monica's catchphrase is "I know!"

=== Relationships ===
Richard Burke

Monica begins dating Dr. Richard Burke (Tom Selleck), an older man who is also one of her father's best friends and 21 years her senior, during the second season. However, the couple mutually agree to end their relationship after realizing that Richard does not want children, his own having already grown up (and had children of their own), while Monica aspires to eventually raise a family of her own one day. Monica and Richard have a hard time moving on from their relationship, and after running into each other a few months later, start a supposedly casual sexual relationship. However, they quickly admit they are still fundamentally incompatible, and part ways again.

In the sixth season finale, Richard returns and professes his love for Monica, and tells her he wants her back, and wants to have children with her. Since Chandler had been pretending to never want marriage in order for his proposal to be a surprise, Monica considers getting back together with Richard. Chandler confronts Richard, and Richard encourages Chandler to go after Monica, and to never let her go.

Chandler Bing

While in England attending Ross' second wedding, to Emily (Helen Baxendale), Monica sleeps with Chandler. Initially supposed to have been a casual, one-time thing which grew more recurrent, Monica and Chandler eventually develop feelings for each other, but attempt to conceal it from their friends for as long as possible.

Once their relationship is finally out in the open, they often deal with Chandler's relationship issues. He hasn't had much experience with women, and he has commitment issues, both of which cause problems. He is also shown being nervous about Monica's obvious desire to be a mother. Over time however, Chandler grows to be a good partner for Monica. The relationship started with Monica being the more mature (when it comes to relationships) person, but Chandler changes to become the steady person, a great foil for Monica's neuroses.

They eventually move in together and later marry.

After several failed attempts to conceive a child of their own, Monica and Chandler discover that they are both infertile, and ultimately settle upon adoption as an alternative, deciding to adopt the yet-to-be-born child of expectant single mother Erica (Anna Faris). The couple is very much surprised when Erica gives birth to twins, and name the boy Jack after Monica's father, and the girl Erica after her birth mother.

At the series finale, Chandler, Monica, and the twins leave the New York City apartment for a house in Westchester.

== Development ==
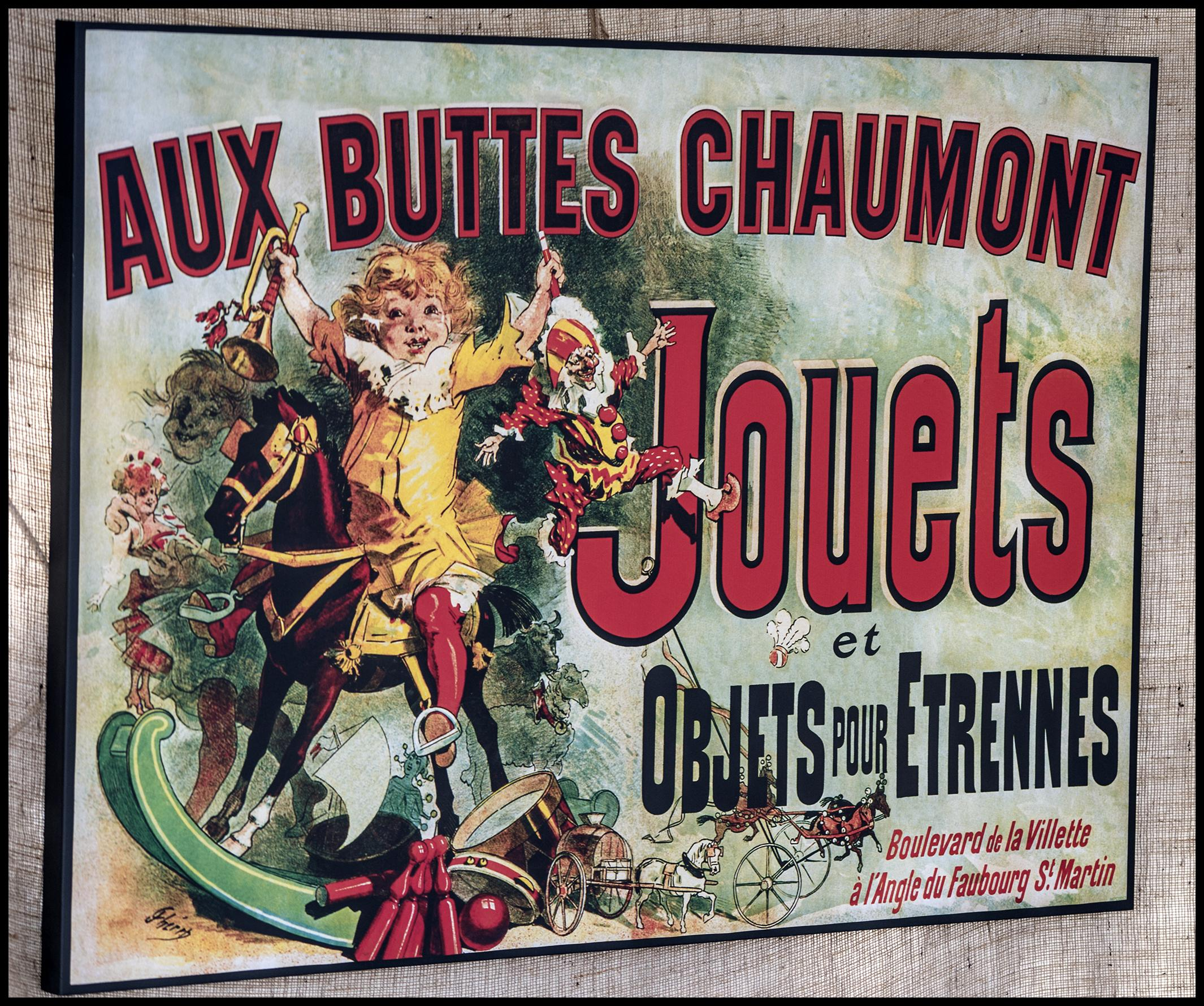
A poster in Monica's apartment, ranked as one of television's most famous sets.

=== Conception and writing ===
Television writers David Crane and Marta Kauffman pitched Friends as a show about "that special time in your life when your friends are your family" to then-NBC president Warren Littlefield shortly after their short-lived sitcom Family Album was canceled by CBS. Inspired by their own experiences as young adults living in New York City, the writers loosely based the six main characters on some of their own friends and family; Monica is based on Kauffman herself. Observing that each main character was written as a "one-note stereotype", Jonathan Bernstein of The Daily Telegraph identified Monica as the group's "uptight fun-killer". When Friends first aired, the majority of its earliest episodes revolved around Monica, via whom each character appears to be interconnected; Friends stars the character's brother, her best friend, her former roommate and her two neighbors socializing in Monica's apartment.

In the pilot, Monica is dumped almost immediately after sleeping with her new date Paul on the night of their first date. Monica is tricked into bed with him after Paul lies to her about his sex life, falsely alleging that he has not slept with anyone in the two years since his wife left him. At first, NBC executives worried that audiences would react to Monica's role unfavorably, thus they decided to survey the studio audience and ask them whether or not they thought that having Monica sleep with someone on their first date made her character too promiscuous. Don Ohlmeyer, then-president of NBC's west coast division, was particularly adamant about his stance against Monica's role in the pilot, which he considered "casual sex". Kauffman recalled Ohlmeyer specifically expressing that Monica deserved to be dumped, a statement by which the writer was greatly offended, dismissing Ohlmeyer as a misogynist. Ultimately, the results returned in favor of Monica; audiences liked the character nonetheless, and the episode aired unchanged.

Early in the series, Monica's apartment is established as one of the show's two primary locations. In the pilot, the apartment number is 5, which was changed to 20 in subsequent episodes after the writers determined that Monica actually lived on a much higher floor. Season three's "The One Where No One's Ready" takes place entirely in Monica's apartment because the show's budget was not large enough to accommodate additional sets or guest stars at that time. In the series finale, Phoebe certifies that each character shared Monica's apartment at least one point during their lives.

==== Relationship with Chandler Bing ====
Andrew Harrison of The New Republic believes that the writers deliberately broke up any main character who was approaching a borderline life-changing relationship because "The ones the Friends were really meant to be with were, after all, the other Friends". Because Monica and Joey were initially conceived as the show's two most sexual characters, Crane and Kauffman had intended for them to be the show's main couple, before ultimately replacing them with Ross and Rachel. The idea of Monica and Joey was abandoned once the role of Joey was cast; actor Matt LeBlanc approached his character using much more of a "big brother vibe" in terms of Joey's relationship with Cox's character as opposed to a romantic one, which the writers ultimately preferred. According to Allison Piwowarski of Bustle, Monica and Joey's relationship would have greatly altered the trajectory of the entire series, having life-changing effects on its characters. However, there were incidents on the show referencing a possible intimate relationship between the two, such as Monica's initial attraction to Joey when he moved in and Monica's intent to sleep with Joey in London rather than Chandler. Those events proved only to be humorous, nonetheless.

Summarizing the role of Monica in the series, Martin Gitlin wrote in his book The Greatest Sitcoms of All Time that while her friends "were ... just out to make the most of their social lives", Monica "sought to keep the others in line" while searching for "Mr. Right", who surprisingly turns out to be close friend Chandler.

Several years before Monica and Chandler became romantically involved, Cox once joked in an interview that if her character were to ever have sex with another main character, it would most likely be Chandler. Crane and Kauffman had never intended to pair off Monica and Chandler with each other, and only decided to expand upon the idea of a relationship between the two friends upon realizing that viewers had "fallen in love" with the notion of Monica and Chandler as a couple. According to Robert Bianco of USA Today, "Their affair came out of the blue and was supposed to quickly return there — but something in the relationship clicked with viewers." The idea of Monica and Chandler's romantic arc surfaced much earlier in the series from writers Scott Silveri and Shana Goldberg-Meehan, who observed the characters' chemistry in the season two episode "The One Where Ross Finds Out", in which an idle and unemployed Monica is temporarily acting as Chandler's personal trainer. However, Silveri's suggestion was initially vetoed by the other writers, who felt that it was simply too soon to introduce another main couple to Friends having just recently paired off Ross and Rachel. Following Ross and Rachel's break up in season three, the writers felt that the timing was just about right to officially introduce Monica and Chandler as a couple, deciding that Friends "can't simply rest on this one [Ross and Rachel] relationship", while believing that Monica and Chandler's would ultimately provide a fun opportunity for the writers to explore brand new storylines.

Silveri and Goldberg-Meehan deliberately intended to keep Monica and Chandler's union "low-key" in order to further differentiate it from Ross and Rachel's, which had been very public. In order to get an idea how audiences would react to Monica and Chandler hooking up at Ross and Emily's wedding in London, the scene in which a clearly nude Monica suddenly emerges from under the sheets of Chandler's hotel bed was filmed in front of three separate test audiences, each of whom responded very enthusiastically to the surprise, several months before the episode was actually taped. Despite the warm reception received from the audience, Silveri and Goldberg-Meehan were at first uncertain as to whether or not they should continue expanding upon their relationship even further, and proceeded with caution by having Monica and Chandler initially keep their relationship hidden from their peers. Protective of their characters, Cox and Perry shared similar hesitations at first, but ultimately grew to accept Monica and Chandler as a couple. The characters' relationship is eventually revealed to their friends in the episode "The One Where Everybody Finds Out". While each character very much approves of their union, Monica's parents initially resent their daughter's feelings for Chandler due to an age-old misunderstanding involving Chandler.

Bianco observed that "On most shows, linking two main characters like Monica and Chandler would have been an act of desperation." However, "On Friends, it was a stroke of genius that made both characters more appealing while providing a needed diversion from the show's central task: Retaining a romantic equilibrium between Ross and Rachel." Monica and Chandler's relationship is the antithesis of Ross and Rachel's because it remained "healthy and strong until the series ended", while the other couple was relentlessly on-and-off. Encyclopedia of Television author Horace Newcomb believes that Monica's feelings for Chandler are responsible for curing the latter's fear of commitment. Similarly, Slate writer Ruth Graham observed that "Chandler is painted as a self-loathing loser with women, until he finally snags Monica at the end of Season 4." Meanwhile, Silveri believes that Friends ultimately ran as long as it did due in part to Monica and Chandler's romance, explaining, "if the center of Friends had remained Ross and Rachel, you would've seen a much shorter shelf life for the show"; Monica and Chandler's arc is believed to have extended the series by approximately three years. Crane and Kauffman had always intended to give Monica and Chandler a child. When it finally came time for them to write the finale, the idea of the couple adopting newborn twins was conceived at the last minute simply "for fun". The birth of Monica and Chandler's twins serves as one of the finale's main plots. They were named Jack and Erica – after Monica's father and their birth mother, respectively. The twins are born three minutes and forty-six seconds apart. Although the surprise addition of Monica and Chandler's twins was generally well received, critics questioned the fact that the babies are brought home from the hospital the same day as their delivery.

=== Casting ===
Monica is portrayed by American actress Courteney Cox.

Crane and Kauffman had written the role of Monica with comedienne Janeane Garofalo in mind, because they were drawn to her "edgier and snarkier" voice. However, Garofalo turned down the offer. Actress Jami Gertz was also offered the role but declined, while actress Leah Remini auditioned for Monica prior to guest starring as a pregnant single mother in an early episode. Kristin Davis also auditioned, and later guest starred in the episode "The One with Ross's Library Book".

A close competitor for the role of Monica was actress Nancy McKeon; Littlefield recalled having greatly enjoyed Cox and McKeon's auditions equally, and left the final decision up to Crane and Kauffman. Ultimately, Cox won the role over McKeon because the creators noticed "something fresh" in her audition; Kauffman elaborated that Cox ultimately "brought a whole bunch of other colors" to Monica than what they had first envisioned back when they were considering Garofalo for the part.

Before being cast as Monica in Friends, Cox was best known for appearing in singer Bruce Springsteen's "Dancing in the Dark" music video; within the television industry for her recurring role as Lauren Miller, Alex P. Keaton's girlfriend, on the sitcom Family Ties; and Melissa Robinson in the comedy film Ace Ventura: Pet Detective (1994), opposite Jim Carrey. After guest starring on the sitcom Seinfeld as Meryl, main character Jerry Seinfeld's girlfriend, the producers offered Cox the role of Monica's spoiled best friend Rachel because the actress "had this cheery, upbeat energy", which was significantly different from how they had envisioned Monica at the time. Feeling she was not "quirky" enough to portray Rachel, Cox lobbied in favor of playing Monica instead because she was drawn to the character's "strong" personality, but the producers feared that she was not "tough" enough for the role, which was offered to actress Jennifer Aniston, alongside whom Cox would eventually co-star. Meanwhile, Aniston ultimately won the role of Rachel. Each main cast member auditioned for Friends having had some degree of prior sitcom experience. Before finally being cast in Friends, Cox's burgeoning success as an actress had heavily relied on her physical appearance. Unlike her previous roles in projects such as Family Ties and Ace Ventura: Pet Detective, the Los Angeles Times Steve Weinstein believes that Monica was the first major role in which Cox was cast based on her abilities as a comedic actress as opposed to her beauty. Cox believes that she owes winning the role to her brief stint as Gabriella Easden on the short-lived sitcom The Trouble with Larry, which she considers to be the first time she played a character who "was the funny one", which in turn earned the actress a recommendation for Friends following its cancellation.

When Friends premiered, Cox was the show's most famous main cast member among a cast of young, relatively unknown actors, and was thus initially perceived by critics and audiences as the show's star, despite Crane and Kauffman's efforts to promote Friends as an ensemble comedy. According to actress Lisa Kudrow, who portrays Phoebe, Cox is responsible for suggesting that the entire cast work together as a team. As the most experienced cast member at the time, Cox advised her co-stars to remain open to each other's ideas, notes and suggestions, while giving them permission to tell her "If I could do anything funnier".

Cox was the highest-paid cast member. Preferring to be treated as equals, the entire cast negotiated for universal salaries, demanding that Warner Bros. accommodate their request of $100,000 per episode in season three, increased from their original inaugural season salary of $22,000 per episode. At one point, the actors went as far as threatening to boycott their own show should their demands be denied, temporarily refusing to renew their expired contracts. The studio eventually complied, and by season 10 each actor was being paid $1 million per episode, making Cox and her female co-stars the highest-paid television actresses of all time.

Cox was 29 years old at the time she was cast, making her the show's second oldest main cast member, and was 39 by the beginning of Friends' final season. Additionally, this distinction makes Cox older than her on-screen brother, actor David Schwimmer, who portrays her older brother Ross, who is one year her senior. The actress would deliver Monica's lines emphatically.

Although each character is depicted as an avid coffee drinker, spending much of their free time in a coffee house, Cox herself does not drink coffee, and was only pretending to drink it out of mugs on the show. Kauffman believes that Cox's own cleanliness closely resembles her character's; at times the actress would clean her co-stars' dressing rooms. Cox also shares the character's motherly nature. The actress enjoyed portraying Monica as she was able to "bring more of my own personality to her, and I've never really been able to do that before."

Starpulse.com observed that "As Monica, Cox never quite enjoyed the sort of watercooler storylines that co-star ... Jennifer Aniston had with David Schwimmer as the on-again, off-again Rachel and Ross." At one point, Cox had begun to regret her decision to accept the role of Monica over Rachel due to the character's lack of strong storylines; she eventually relented once Monica and Chandler became romantically involved, thus her character's storylines gradually began to improve.

Cox married actor David Arquette in 1999 while the show was on hiatus between seasons five and six, hence the actress legally changed her full name to Courteney Cox Arquette. The opening credits of the season six premiere "The One After Vegas" features an inside joke in which Cox's new surname "Arquette" is attached to the surnames of each cast and crew member. The episode is dedicated to Cox and Arquette, reading, "For Courteney and David, who did get married." Before marrying Cox, Arquette had guest starred in an episode of Friends as Phoebe's love interest. During season 10, Cox got pregnant with her and Arquette's child. At that same time, her character and on-screen husband were going through the process of adopting a child. Like Monica and Chandler, Cox and Arquette had also struggled with conceiving in real life. Although Kudrow's real-life pregnancy had successfully been written into the show, the same could not have been done for Cox because Friends had already long-established that Monica is incapable of having children. Therefore, the crew attempted to conceal Cox's pregnancy using a combination of baggy, loose-fitting costumes and props instead. However, at times the actress' growing belly was still detectable by viewers in spite of the crew's best efforts.

== Characterization and themes ==
=== Codependency and neuroticism ===
At the beginning of season one, Monica is 25 years old. Rita Loiacono of SheKnows Media believes Monica was the show's most fully realized character from the beginning of the series because her "quirks were developed to a tee." Like several strong female sitcom characters popular throughout the 1980s and 1990s, Monica possesses a natural maternal instinct, constantly "vocalising a desire for motherhood." As the group's "unofficial den mother", Monica fulfills the role of their mother hen, and is thus often perceived as the most level-headed member of the sextet, with Ken Parish Perkins of the Chicago Tribune identifying Monica as the show's most grounded character. Jill O'Rourke of Crushable described her as "the glue that held the group together." Ken Tucker of Entertainment Weekly believes that Monica serves as "the solid center in a circle of wacky pals" due to her "sunny" personality, combined with the fact that she maintains a steady job while appearing to possess the most common sense. Furthermore, Tucker identified Monica as the show's "straight woman". Writing for The New York Times, John J. O'Connor believes that Monica exhibits "the strongest ties to reality" as the sitcom's most realistically portrayed character. Bustle's James Tison agreed that Monica is the show's most relatable character. Referring to Monica as one-half of the series' "head friends", the Pittsburgh Post-Gazette's Robert Bianco described the character as sensible, explaining that she and brother Ross represent "the relatively stable centers around which the other friends rotate." Describing her as "ultra-competent", Natural Living Today's Emily Nussbaum likened Monica to the fairy tale character Snow White, on whose homemaking skills the five other main characters heavily rely, similar to the relationship between Snow White and the seven dwarfs. Although Monica began Friends as the show's straight person, the writers eventually made her funnier by incorporating aspects of Cox's own personality into the character, in addition to writing wittier material for her.

Identified by Ayn Bernos of Thought Catalog as "the epitome of a ... control freak", Refinery29's Kelsey Miller summarized Monica's personality as funny, uptight, loving, and competitive. A very organized character with a signature Type A personality who enjoys being in charge, Monica is known for being a "neat freak" obsessed with cleanliness – especially when it comes to maintaining the impeccable condition of her apartment – neurotic, extremely obsessive–compulsive, and competitive in nature, personality traits that are exaggerated for humor and comic relief; the writers did not begin to take full comedic advantage of Monica's neuroses until the show's first Thanksgiving episode. The character is also the loudest of her friends. In her book Writing With Emotion, Tension, and Conflict: Techniques for Crafting an Expressive and Compelling Novel, author Cheryl St. John wrote that Monica exhibits qualities commonly associated with perfectionism and bossiness. James Tison of Bustle wrote that Monica's cleanliness and bossiness often relinquishes her to being "the lame one" among her friends, although "she proved that sometimes rules and responsibility were important". However, the Los Angeles Times' Steve Weinstein observed that Monica's actions often tend to contradict her "Miss Perfect" image and reputation, explaining that the character frequently "makes a fool of herself" in addition to being "so compulsively neat that just her facial expressions of discomfort at one of her friends' messing things up in her apartment is enough to provoke genuine chuckles." Her obsessive–compulsive traits are portrayed in a 'fun and quirky way'. However, and despite popular belief, these traits do not fall within the framework of obsessive–compulsive disorder.

As creator and writer, Kauffman confirmed that Monica's extremely organized personality is based on her own, explaining, "I have a lot of Monica in me, in terms of everything having to be a certain way." Writing about the development of Monica's personality in USA Today, Robert Bianco observed that the character gradually evolves from "the caring, nurturing mother figure ... into a slightly off-the-beam benevolent monarch." By the show's final season, Monica's personality has been "exacerbated for comedy" to the point of which she becomes borderline "cartoonish".

=== Family and childhood; career and love life ===
Monica has a complicated relationship with her parents Jack (Elliott Gould) and Judy Geller (Christina Pickles), particularly with her "hypercritical" mother. Entertainment Weekly called the character's relationship with her parents "esteem-sucking". Judy constantly criticizes her daughter's appearance, career and love life, while acting much kinder towards Ross, whom she favors. Chelsea Mize of Bustle observed that Monica and Ross' "wacky quirks become all the more understandable after ... seeing them with their parents." Encyclopedia of Television Shows, 1925 through 2010 author Vincent Terrance believes that Monica's competitive nature originates from having grown up constantly competing with Ross. Kriti Tulsiani of IBNLive described Monica and Ross' relationship as "A blend of love and sibling jealousy with an urge to irritate each other to the deepest core of existence", with Ross often making fun of his sister's weight and Monica teasing him about his several failed marriages in return. In terms of ethnicity, Crane confirmed that both Monica and Ross are half-Jewish, with their father being Jewish and their mother being of non-Jewish European ancestry. However, Television's Changing Image of American Jews categorized Monica as a "masked" Jew, explaining that "the smart, funny, and insecure Ross seems more Jewish" than Monica, who the author dismissed as "china-doll like" in appearance and demeanor. In his book Encyclopedia of American Jewish History, Volume 1, author Stephen Harlan Norwood agrees that, unlike the show's male Jews, Monica's Jewish "markers" have been virtually removed.

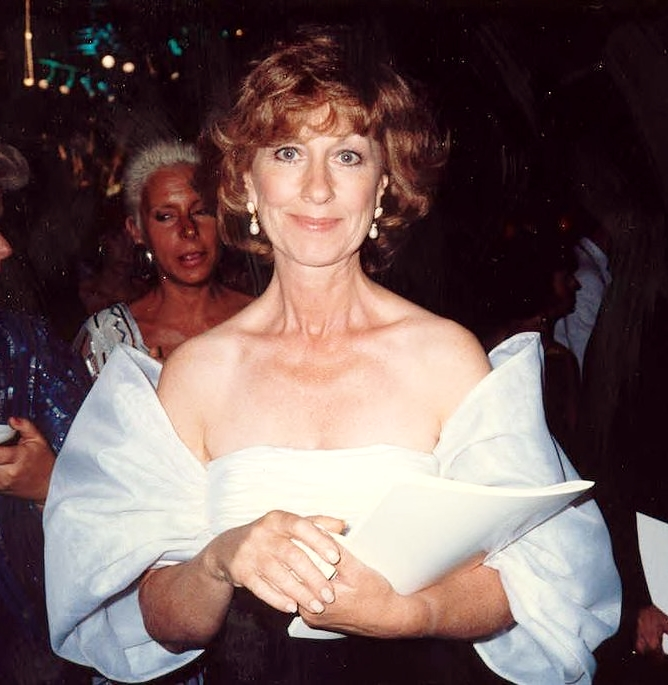
Actress Christina Pickles portrays Monica's hypercritical mother, Judy Geller.

Although Monica and Rachel have remained best friends since high school, they are very much opposites. While both characters share similar economic backgrounds, they grew up on "different ends of the high school social order", with Rachel being a popular cheerleader and Monica "deal[ing] with body and control issues due to being an overweight child and teen." Sabienna Bowman of This Was TV observed that "Monica's struggles ultimately left her more confident than Rachel, as well as more prepared for adulthood." Among her defining qualities, Monica has had a passion for cooking ever since childhood, stemming from when she received her first Easy-Bake Oven. A chef, the character has had several cooking-related jobs throughout the series, having worked at five different restaurants, a trend that nearly coincides with her constant rotation of boyfriends in an ongoing search for the "perfect match". Michael Hogan of The Guardian believes that the character's "competitive, perfectionist, obsessive–compulsive nature made her ideally suited to a career as a chef." However, in an episode where Monica goes through great lengths to impress her neighbors with her candy-making skills, it is revealed that Monica might have pursued cooking to get people to like her. In addition, her love of cooking and food is also responsible for her having been extremely overweight as a child, throughout high school and college. The running gag of an overweight Monica is often used as a recurring backstory for the character throughout the series, first explored in the second-season episode "The One With the Prom Video" via flashback. One of the character's childhood nicknames was "Big Fat Goalie" when she played field hockey. While overweight, Monica is depicted as having very low self-esteem, binge eating often, and constantly seeking attention. While in college, Monica is embarrassed into losing weight permanently after overhearing her then-crush Chandler make fun of her appearance. Media and the Rhetoric of Body Perfection: Cosmetic Surgery, Weight Loss and Beauty in Popular Culture author Dr. Deborah Harris-Moore believes that Monica's tendency to come off as a control freak originates from her childhood struggles with weight gain, explaining that the character ate excessively in order "to cope with her emotions".

Possessing a very strong will, the character tends to exhibit outstanding perseverance when it comes to what she expects out of her relationships, jobs, and life in general, oftentimes refusing to settle for anything less than what satisfies her. Early in the series, Monica develops a reputation for experiencing bad luck and encountering rather unfortunate circumstances when it comes to dating, romantic relationships, and her love life. Nick at Nite joked that the character "likes to keep things tidy in her home and love life, although the latter is a bit more difficult." This motif is frequently explored as a source of comic relief; the character's friends would often "pick apart" her new dates and boyfriends. In his review of the series, David Hiltbrand of People referred to the character as "an unlucky-in-love codependent", while the Chicago Tribune's Ken Parish Perkins observed that Monica "often misfires when shooting for Mr. Right." According to Mike D'Avria of Splitsider, Monica "never shied away from jumping into the sac with both random guys and people she worked with" – among them a high school senior, an old high school crush, and an alcoholic – prior to dating Chandler, and of the show's six main characters maintains the highest total of serious relationships. Cox described Monica as goofy, angry, and sarcastic, while referring to her as the show's most sexually active character despite her "goody two shoes" image.

Out of Friends' female characters, Monica's style took the longest to establish. InStyle wrote that Monica's combination of short, wavy hair and dark lipstick evoked "a '90s take on '40s style." Ashley Hoffman of Styleite believes that her character initially "dressed like a tourist trying to look like a New Yorker", frequently sporting jeans, overalls, and cargo shorts. With a wardrobe comprising dresses and pants equally, Monica's fashion sense, much like Rachel and Phoebe's, "was a little bit normcore, a little bit corporate-casual." Elle's Mahalia Chang observed that Monica did not follow trends of the time as much as Rachel, preferring to boast mom jeans, "boxy" sweaters, sneakers and flannels.

== Critical reception ==
Four months before its premiere, Friends failed NBC's confidential research report, which cited the unlikeability of its six main characters as a possible factor. Although the report acknowledged Monica as the only character with whom test audiences identified somewhat positively, NBC admitted that reception towards the character was "well below desirable levels for a lead" nonetheless. In retrospect, The New Republic's Andrew Harrison believes that although Monica and her friends "were superficial, self-absorbed and at first difficult to like ... in their solipsism and neurosis they reflected and sent up the world emerging around them ... far more accurately than any conventional gooey-hearted family sitcom", ultimately "creat[ing] a coffee-scented cocoon that millions wanted to enter". Reviews gradually improved; an early critical evaluation of Friends, which had pegged Cox as the show's star, read, "As Monica, [Cox] came across as charming, attractive, confident, and motivated – the leader of the group". While men found the actress attractive, women appreciated her sense of humor.

When Friends premiered in September 1994, critics initially perceived Monica as the show's main character; Entertainment Weekly's Ken Tucker attributes this to the fact that Cox was the show's most famous cast member at the time. The actress has garnered largely positive reviews for her performance, with Tucker concluding that Cox "plays straight woman ... with alluring modesty". Tony Scott of Variety commended the entire cast for "appear[ing] resourceful and display[ing] sharp sitcom skills ... especially Cox", while The Baltimore Sun's David Zurawik described her acting as "terrific". John Kiesewetter of The Cincinnati Enquirer praised Cox's ability to "deliver both verbal and physical comedy". Contactmusic.com's Sophie Miskiw commended Cox for portraying Monica with "endearing neurosis". As a character, Lifetime described Monica as "neurotic yet lovable". Bustle's Emma Lord wrote, "I can't imagine why anyone wouldn't want to be Monica Geller", describing her as a "smart" and "savvy" character. Despite admitting that Monica is "probably not our favourite character", TalkTalk conceded that she is "wonderfully neurotic", while Nick at Nite reviewed her as "just as lovable as she is neurotic", despite her overbearing personality. Howard Rosenberg of the Los Angeles Times was receptive towards the entire cast, especially Cox and her character, who he described as "strong" and "likable and funny". Also writing for the Los Angeles Times, Glenn Whipp lauded Cox's tenure on Friends, enthusing that the actress successfully "took a character loaded with obsessive–compulsive quirks and a goofy, overly competitive nature and fashioned a flesh-and-blood woman". Describing the actress' comic timing as "impeccable", Whipp went on to write that Cox "brought out Monica's insecurities in a way that turned self-deprecation into an art form". Jenna Mullins of E! dubbed Cox "a fantastic comedic actress". Alec Harvey of The Birmingham News described Monica as a "very, very funny" character. Kayla Upadhyaya of The Michigan Daily appreciated the fact that "Cox brought moments of sincerity and severity to Monica". However, The Washington Post panned Cox's performance as "degrading", while Mike Ryan of ScreenCrush dismissed Monica as a "fairly normal, but boring" character.

In 1999, Cox was nominated for an American Comedy Award for Funniest Supporting Female Performer in a TV Series. Although continuously praised for her performance, Cox never received an Emmy Award nomination for her role on Friends during its entire run, although each of her five co-stars did. Both female castmates Lisa Kudrow and Jennifer Aniston remain the show's only main cast members to have won the award, whose multiple nominations Cox especially "had a hard time not taking ... personally", admitting to having been "hurt" by the snub. A number of media outlets cite Cox among several successful television actors whom they believe deserve but are yet to win an Emmy Award. The Academy of Television Arts & Sciences' failure to acknowledge Cox prompted Jenna Mullins of E! to ask "if Hollywood has something against honoring a fantastic comedic actress like Cox." In 2014, SheKnows Media published an article explaining five reasons author Rita Loiacono believes Monica is "the best character on Friends", citing her cleanliness, bluntness and role as "the heart of the group", among others. Loiacono enthused that Monica "didn't just have one defining aspect; she had many, and they were all equally hilarious. Not to mention, her ambition and vulnerability resulted in some of the show's most touching and heartbreaking moments". Additionally, Loiacono dismissed the fact that Cox has never received an Emmy Award nomination for her performance as Monica as "downright criminal". In 2015, HitFix wrote a similar article entitled "5 Reasons Monica Geller is the Best Friends Friend", published in tandem with Cox's 51st birthday. An article in The Birmingham News cited "The One Where it All Began", "The One With Two Parts: Part 2", "The One with the Prom Video", "The One with Chandler in a Box", "The One with the Embryos", "The One with All the Thanksgivings", "The One Where Everybody Finds Out", "The One On the Last Night", "The One with the Proposal", "The One with Monica and Chandler's Wedding" and "The Last One" among Monica's best episodes; Cox herself acknowledged "The One with the Embryos" as her personal favorite. Meanwhile, BDCwire ranked "The One with the Routine", "The One with the Cheap Wedding Dress", "The One with Monica's Boots", "The One with the Jellyfish" and "The One Where Monica Sings" among the character's best.

Despite consistently warm reception towards Cox and her character, some aspects of Monica's characterization have been criticized. The second season episode "The One Where Dr. Ramoray Dies" sparked controversy due to one of its storylines revolving around Monica and Rachel arguing over which roommate will win the last remaining condom in their apartment in order to have sex with their respective boyfriends, Richard and Ross. In her book Narratives, Health, and Healing: Communication Theory, Research, and Practice, author Lynn M. Harter defended the storyline, arguing that it promotes safe sex. Rachel eventually wins the condom in a game of rock, paper, scissors, forcing Monica to abstain for the night. Monica's overweight alter-ego "Fat Monica" has often been accused of being an offensive stereotype of overweight women exploited for laughs. While identifying a formerly overweight character as "a standard TV trope", the New Statesman's Bim Adewunmi wrote that Fat Monica "always struck a weird note" with the writer despite the show's efforts "to pinpoint a solid and satisfying back-story for the character". Megan Kirby of xoJane questioned the negative effect the show's fat jokes would have on its overweight viewers, writing, "What does this mean for the girls like me who never become thin? Are we relegated to side roles and stereotypes in our own lives? Of course, this isn't true. But I think it sometimes, dark and secret: The fat girl doesn't get to be the protagonist." Emma Tarver of Feminspire reflected that Fat Monica "made me think as a child that I was unworthy of love, was going to be mocked relentlessly by my friends and family for my weight, and should never bother flirting because I would just disgust every man I looked at." Contrarily, Kelsey Miller of Refinery29 received Fat Monica positively as "proof I could overcome my disgusting plumpness and be seen as lovable, too". In spite of these complaints, Fat Monica proved so popular among audiences that the writers would resurrect the character for a total of four flashback episodes, each of which aired featuring Cox dressed as Fat Monica and eating a doughnut while dancing after the show had finished taping much to the amusement of the studio audience. Although she only appears physically in four, Fat Monica is referenced in approximately half of the show's episodes, and has since proven popular enough to be adapted into an internet meme.

== Legacy ==
=== Impact and commendations ===
According to Elle, the combined popularity of Monica and Cox established them both as television icons during the 1990s. Additionally, baby name books commonly associate the name "Monica" with the character. As the role in which Cox "found fame", Monica remains the actress' most iconic performance to-date, as well as the role for which she is best known. Us Weekly believes that Cox "made television history during her 10 year stint playing Monica". Meanwhile, Steve Weinstein of the Los Angeles Times credits Cox's comedic performance with helping dispel stereotypes that "Pretty women aren't supposed to be funny". In 1995, one year after Friends premiered, Cox appeared on the cover of People's "50 Most Beautiful People" issue. According to Alabama Biographical Dictionary author Jan Onofrio, Monica helped "put [Cox] in the television spotlight and provided offers for more desirable roles." The Daily News deemed Cox "one of the more successful 'Friends' since the show ended" thanks to her consistent television and film roles. By both starring in and producing the sitcom Cougar Town, which has been reviewed as her "best gig since ... Friends", Cox became the series' first main cast member to achieve long-term television success post-Friends.

According to a Hollywood Reporter poll, industry professionals – actors, writers and directors – voted Monica the 47th best fictional female character. ChaCha collectively ranked Phoebe, Rachel and Monica the 11th, 12th and 13th best female television characters of all time. Maria Tallarico of Cosmopolitan observed that a number of Monica's storylines, including one in which she unintentionally has sex with a high school senior, "probably wouldn't fly on TV today". Writing for Mic.com, Samantha Allen believes that Monica helped "set the standard for how sitcoms could and would talk about sex" by both engaging in casual sex and dating a much older man. According to Dustin Levy of The Diamondback, Monica inspired "any ensemble cast in a sitcom with a female character who is bossy or neurotic", citing Scrubs' Elliot Reid and Happy Endings' Jane Kerkovich-Williams as examples of Monica's influence. Additionally, Levy identified Claire Dunphy from the sitcom Modern Family as Monica's modern-day successor, explaining that the character "acts like Monica plus children". In spring 2015, TV Guide published an article entitled "22 Spring Cleaning Tips From Monica Geller" in tribute to the character's cleanliness. In her article "5 Signs You're A Real-Life Monica Geller", Ayn Bernos of Thought Catalog identified the character's personality as the reason "all perfectionist fans of this iconic TV show have asked themselves this question at least once in their life: 'Oh my god, am I a Monica Geller?!'" Emma Lord of Bustle expounded in her article "13 Signs You Are The Monica Of Your Friend Group" "that isn't to say life is easy for the Real Life Monicas of the world. First, there's all the name calling: 'neat freak' and 'sore loser', to name a few. Second, all of your elaborate, carefully-laid plans inevitably go haywire when people around you don't respect the obvious beauty and rightness of them." According to Patricia Murphy of the Irish Independent, Monica "is most definitely one of the most famous fictional telly chefs", expounding, "her OCD combined with her continuous strive for perfection making her a thoroughly enjoyable watch." The Guardian ranked Monica fifth on the newspaper's list of "The 10 best fictional chefs", while People ranked the character eighth, with author Grace Gavilanes writing, "She's the best kind of chef – neurotic in the most entertaining/productive way, and always cleans up the mess in her kitchen."

One of the show's main locations, Monica's apartment currently ranks among television's most famous sets.

USA Today's Robert Bianco credits Monica and Chandler's relationship and their wedding in the episode "The One With Monica and Chandler's Wedding" with saving Friends. Prior to the episode, the show had "appeared to be in serious danger of out-staying its welcome." Although admitting that the overall episode "is not one of Friends' best", Bianco explained that "The wedding changed all that, and in remarkable fashion." While BuzzFeed ranked Monica and Chandler the 23rd best television couple, E! placed the couple second on its ranking of the greatest Friends couples, with author Sydney Bucksbaum writing, "It's hard to imagine a time when Monica and Chandler weren't together, but it took them four seasons to actually get together. From then on, it was clear that they were meant to be." Tim Gerstenberger of TV Overmind echoed this sentiment by ranking Chandler Monica's best boyfriend, awarding him an 'A' grade. Gerstenberger penned, "I would not be able to face myself every day if I did not rank Chandler the best of Monica's boyfriends from Friends. The two ended up getting married, which just goes to show that some one night stands are meant to last." Monica and Ross' relationship was also influential. According to Kriti Tulsiani of IBNLive, the characters "provide a perfect exception to the myth that one cannot find a best friend in their sibling particularly when they are of opposite sex ... they have broken all the conventional boundaries of a brother-sister relationship." PopSugar ranked Monica and Ross fifth on the website's list of "The 9 Best Sibling Relationships From '90s TV"

Immediately established as one of the show's primary settings, Monica's large Greenwich Village apartment has since become one of the most famous and iconic television sets in history. Steffani Cameron of BuildDirect wrote that Monica's "apartment was unlike anything else on TV. It was full of color, clutter, and personality. It was a space cobbled together of kitsch and class, and it was just magic", citing its windows, color and openness among her favourite things about the apartment. Harper's Bazaar magazine ranked it among the "12 Best Apartments on TV". Chloe Daley of Refinery29 joked that the apartment serves as both "a lesson in how to decorate with purple" and "a lesson in how not to". Based on its total number of bedrooms, open kitchen concept, large living space and balcony, real estate agent Sydney Blumstein estimates that the apartment would be worth approximately US$2.3 million in 2015. In terms of its size and affordability, the apartment has frequently been the subject of scrutiny; critics constantly question how Monica, a chef, and Rachel, a waitress, were able to afford such a luxurious home based on their relatively low incomes, often dismissing the show's explanation that this is due to an illegal sublet courtesy of Monica's grandmother who moved to Florida. Hollywood.com's Abbey Stone ranked it television's 10th "most ridiculous" apartment, while The Village Voice placed it at number four in a similar article.

=== Wardrobe and fashion ===
Friends' female characters had a profound influence on women's fashion during the 1990s, becoming fashion icons in addition and household names, in addition to inspiring a generation of women. According to Desiree Tolentino of Verge Campus, "Rachel and Monica were THE fashion icons back in the day", writing, "Monica Geller's vivacious style and sex appeal inspires every girl to care just a little bit more about what they wear". TheTalko contributor Taylor Hodgkins agreed that both Rachel "and Monica ... became cultural icons ... due to the fact the characters became fashion icons ... For those of us who thought of ourselves to be fashion mavens, we loved to tune into Friends to see what Monica and Rachel had in their closets week after week." Describing Monica's wardrobe as "classic and elegant", Stylist observed that the character's first season bob cut was imitated by several woman, although its popularity paled in comparison to that of Aniston's iconic "Rachel" haircut, the widespread success of which Cox was jealous. However, Cosmopolitan identified Monica's hairstyle as "Iconic in its own right", including in its list of "20 iconic Friends hairstyles". Monica also became well known for accessorizing sweaters using scarves; on Cox's 51st birthday in 2015, Cosmopolitan published an article celebrating her character's best sweaters. BuzzFeed ranked Monica's wedding dress seventh on the website's list of the "28 TV Show Wedding Dresses You'll Always Envy", while Brides ranked it the ninth greatest wedding dress in television history. Us Weekly included it on their list of "Celebrity Wedding Dresses: TV & Movies". Lauren Bravo of Grazia wrote that although "It's hard for us to process some of Monica's early outfits ... there's a lot of great stuff to be pilfered from Monica's pleasingly preppy wardrobe", despite its heavy tailoring. Meanwhile, The Daily Telegraph cited several of Monica's outfits and hairstyles among the newspaper's list of "Friends best fashion moments".

In recent years, fans' appreciation for Monica's wardrobe has grown following the series' availability on Netflix, with The Guardian journalist Jess Cartner-Morley observing that audiences "were all too busy admiring Rachel's hair and Chandler's jokes first time around to notice Monica Geller's love of mom jeans and hair barrettes. But the world has finally caught up with the poster girl for 90s normcore", to the point at which it rivals Rachel's. Crowning her the "unlikely style icon" of summer 2019, Cartner-Morley observed the characters' influence on the outfits of several celebrities, namely Bella Hadid and Harry Styles. The writer also coined this revival "The Monaissance" due to the character "unexpectedly [finding] a breakout role as a style icon", and citing the character parting her hair to the side using a barrette, ribbed vests, high-waisted mom jeans, pale denim straight-fit jeans and white trainers among fashion trends that have been adopted by modern-day viewers. The newspaper credits Monica's popularity to audience's revived interest in cooking shows. While comparing Styles' fashion choices to Monica's wardrobe, Ben Boskovich of Esquire named the character the "most stylish" of Friends' main characters and "a menswear icon ahead of her time". In 2019, Business Insider compiled a list of Monica's 16 most iconic outfits, with author Paige Bennett writing "As a professional chef, Monica had to adhere to a strict dress code at work but when the apron came off, Monica donned a sleek yet down-to-earth wardrobe that can still be appreciated today." Elle named Monica "The Best-Dressed Character On 'Friends'" in what Mahalia Chang called a controversial, "potentially-unpopular opinion" as most fans give this designation to Rachel.

== See also ==
- List of Friends and Joey characters
