= Economic Development and Research Center (Armenia) =

Armenian think tank

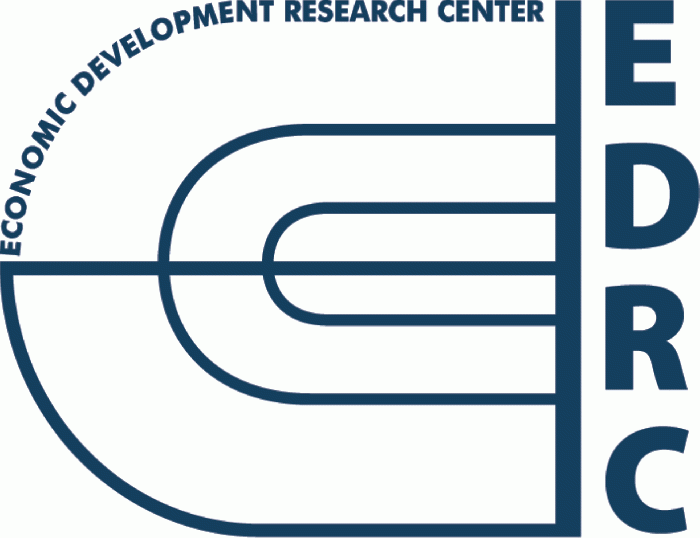
- EDRC is located at Karapet Ulnetsi str., 58/1 in Yerevan
- Formation: 2001
- Type: Independent, Non-profit Think Tank
- Location: Yerevan, Armenia
- Executive Director: Karine Harutyunyan
- Website: edrc.am

Established in 2001, the Economic Development and Research Center (Armenian: «Տնտեսական Զարգացման և Հետազոտությունների Կենտրոն») is a Yerevan based non-profit, nonpartisan think-tank dedicated to addressing economic and social challenges and contributing to public policy discourse in Armenia.

== Mission and values ==
The mission of EDRC is to conduct high-quality policy relevant research and build capacities to contribute to sound social policy formation and the development of a competitive economy in Armenia.

EDRC is a politically independent institution and is therefore not affiliated with any specific political party and or interests. Independent statehood, democracy and regional cooperation, private entrepreneurship and social cohesion form the ideological underpinnings of the center.

== Areas of interest ==
A broad spectrum of policy areas, ranging from Sustainable Human Development and Social Security, Infrastructure and Knowledge Economy, Economic Governance and Public Administration to Sustainability of Growth and Development Prospects lie at the center of EDRC's attention. The Center gathers and analyzes data, monitors and evaluates public policies and services, and based on its findings develops policy options and relevant recommendations.

EDRC disseminates its knowledge and research results through its website, various independent reports and publications, the Economic Policy Journal, as well as events such as symposia, workshops and training. The output of EDRC's work is aimed to draw attention towards salient issues that impact Armenia's socioeconomic development, promote healthy discussions on these matters and contribute to informed policy formation in the country.

== Publications ==
Information dissemination is of critical importance to EDRC as it is dedicated to supply the wider public with up-to-date economic and structural data, analysis and research reports. Throughout the years, EDRC's publications have attracted a great number of readers, both in and outside Armenia and have interested numerous experts and professionals in various areas.

== Team and management ==
EDRC has a multi-layer governance structure that includes the General Meeting, Chairman, consultative bodies, executive office and the research team. The center also draws on a large pool of consultants’ network, and, affiliates. The General Meeting (Management Council) is the governing body of the center.

== Partners and donors ==
Through the years the center has built a strong track record of successfully implemented projects that involved close collaboration with various national and international institutions such as the:

- Asian Development Bank (ADB),
- Department for International Development (DFID), UK
- German International Cooperation Agency (GIZ),
- Millennium Challenge Corporation (MCC),
- NOVIB, the Netherlands,
- Oxfam GB,
- UN Development Fund for Women (UNIFEM),
- UN Development Programme (UNDP),
- United States Agency for International Development (USAID),
- World Bank (WB),
- World Food Programme (WFP)

EDRC has traditionally cooperated with various government agencies in Armenia as Ministries of Economy, Finance, Labor and Social Issues, Transport and Communications, as well as Statistical Committee of Armenia, Central Bank of Armenia, State Employment Service and other agencies.
