= The Pilot (Friends) =

Pilot episode of Friends

- Friends episode
- Episode no.: Season 1 Episode 1
- Directed by: James Burrows
- Written by: David Crane &; Marta Kauffman
- Cinematography by: Ken Lamkin
- Editing by: Andy Zall
- Original air date: September 22, 1994

Guest appearances
- John Allen Nelson as Paul "the Wine Guy"; Clea Lewis as Franny

Episode chronology
← Previous —	Next → "The One with the Sonogram at the End"
- Friends season 1

"The Pilot" (also known as "The One Where Monica Gets a Roommate", "The First One", and "The One Where It All Began" (Note: In its initial airing the episode was simply titled "The Pilot", but was retroactively retitled "The One Where Monica Gets a Roommate" on the DVD release, and is also titled as such on Netflix, Amazon Video, iTunes, HBO Max, and syndication television listings. Other alternate titles on television listings, though lesser used, are "The One Where It All Began" and "The First One".)) is the pilot episode and series premiere of the American television sitcom Friends. The episode premiered on NBC on September 22, 1994. It was written by the show's creators, David Crane and Marta Kauffman, and directed by James Burrows. The pilot introduces six twenty-something friends who live and work in New York City: Monica Geller, a single sous chef in her mid 20s who is illegally subletting her grandmother's apartment; Ross Geller, Monica's older brother, a paleontologist whose marriage recently ended after he learned his wife, Carol, is a lesbian; Rachel Green, Monica's spoiled, self-centered, high-school best friend who has just left her fiancé at the altar and is financially cut off by her father; Chandler Bing, Ross's college roommate and best friend who lives across the hall from Monica; Joey Tribbiani, a struggling Italian-American actor and Chandler's roommate; and Phoebe Buffay, a laid-back, hippie-ish masseuse, singer and guitar player.

Crane and Kauffman pitched their original idea to network NBC in 1993. NBC liked it and commissioned a complete script, which was submitted in 1994. Before the script was finished, casting for the six main roles began; 75 actors were seen for each part. The Friends pilot episode was taped on May 4, at Warner Bros.' studios in Burbank, California. After making final edits to the episode, executive producer Kevin Bright submitted it on May 11, two days before NBC was due to announce the schedule. Satisfied with the completed pilot, NBC ordered 12 more episodes for the first season. The episode was watched by approximately 22 million viewers, making it the fifteenth-most-watched television show of the week. Critics compared the show unfavorably to Seinfeld and Ellen, noting the similarities all three series had in depicting friends conversing about their lives. The cast, particularly Schwimmer, were complimented, though there was some concern that the character roles were undeveloped and that the plot for the pilot would not go over well with audiences.

== Plot ==
At the Central Perk coffee shop, Monica Geller is teased by her friends, Phoebe Buffay, Chandler Bing and Joey Tribbiani, about going out with someone and claiming it is not a date. Ross Geller, Monica's older brother, arrives at the coffee shop, upset that his lesbian ex-wife has moved out of their apartment to begin a new relationship with her partner. A young woman suddenly arrives wearing a wet wedding dress, whom Monica recognizes as her high-school best friend, Rachel Green. Monica introduces her to the others as Rachel reveals she left her fiancé at the altar, realizing that she does not love him. After Rachel's father cuts her off financially over the phone, Monica reluctantly takes Rachel in as a new roommate.

Meanwhile, Joey and Chandler console Ross while helping him assemble new furniture. Ross begins to wonder if any woman would be "the right one" for him. Monica goes on her first date with Paul the "wine guy", who confides in her that he has not been able to perform sexually since his wife left him. Monica is touched by his admission, and they sleep together. The next day, however, she learns from a coworker that Paul's story about his ex-wife is just a ruse to bed women. After her attempts to get a job are unsuccessful, Rachel ends up buying a new pair of boots with one of her credit cards, which she admits her father pays for. Egged on by the group, Rachel reluctantly cuts up her credit cards to announce her independence.

That night, Ross and Rachel talk and he confesses that he once was infatuated with her during high school; she admits that she knew. He asks if he can ask her out sometime, and she says yes. Ross leaves the apartment feeling newfound hope. In the final scene, the entire group is in Central Perk having coffee with Rachel, who begins a new career as a coffee shop waitress.

== Production ==
=== Conception ===
Creators and writers David Crane and Marta Kauffman were known in the television industry for writing the cable television series Dream On. A second series by the duo, Family Album, had premiered on CBS in the Fall of 1993 season but was cancelled after airing six episodes. In November 1993, they began developing three new television pilots from their offices at Warner Bros. Television that could premiere in the Fall 1994 season. As Dream On had won them clout in Hollywood, they aimed to pitch one of their ideas to NBC; Insomnia Cafe, (Note: The seven-page treatment was titled Insomnia Cafe. The first script was originally titled Friends Like Us, but was changed to Six of One to avoid confusion with These Friends of Mine. By the time the series was commissioned, the title was simply Friends.) about six friends who live and work in New York City, was pitched as a seven-page treatment to the network in December 1993.

"It's about sex, love, relationships, careers, a time in your life when everything's possible. And it's about friendship because when you're single and in the city, your friends are your family."

— Part of Crane and Kauffman's original pitch for Insomnia Cafe

NBC bought the pitch as a put pilot, meaning they risked financial penalties if the pilot was not filmed. To get an idea of how their characters would behave, Kauffman interviewed several of her children's twenty-something babysitters. She and Crane wrote the script in three days. James Burrows, known for directing Cheers, was hired to direct it. He liked the script, though asked for Joey, who was originally written similarly to Chandler, to be "dumbed up a bit". The script was completed in early March 1994, though before then eight-line character breakdowns had been sent to acting agencies in Los Angeles, New York and Chicago.

=== Casting ===
1,000 actors replied to the callouts for each role, but only 75 were called in to read for the casting director. Those who received a callback read again in front of Crane, Kauffman, and their production partner Kevin S. Bright. At the end of March, the potential actors had been reduced to three or four for each part; they read for Les Moonves, president of Warner Bros. Television. David Schwimmer was first to be cast. He was in Chicago doing a stage adaptation of The Master and Margarita when his agent offered him the audition. He was not interested in doing television after a bad experience appearing in Monty, but changed his mind when he learned that it was an ensemble script. Unknown to him, Crane and Kauffman had remembered him from when he auditioned for an earlier pilot of theirs; they had written the part of Ross with Schwimmer in mind to play him. Eric McCormack also auditioned for the role several times. He later became famous for his lead role as Will Truman in the sitcom Will & Grace.

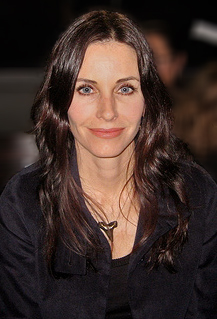
Courteney Cox was the best-known cast member

Courteney Cox was the most well-known of the six main actors. She was being considered for Rachel, but Cox read the script and thought she was a better fit for Monica. After reading for Monica instead, she won the role. Nancy McKeon also read for the part. Jennifer Aniston read for the part of Rachel after initially being considered for Monica. Her contract with the CBS TV series Muddling Through meant that any role with Friends would be in second position to the series. The CBS show was not scheduled to be broadcast until mid-1994 after NBC announced whether Friends would be greenlit; if Muddling Through became a rating success and CBS enforced Aniston's contract, Friends would have had to recast her. Within three days of first auditioning for Friends Aniston nonetheless got the role, because NBC Entertainment president Warren Littlefield correctly expected that Muddling Through would immediately fail. Crane and Kauffman wanted Joey to be "a guy's guy" who loves "women, sports, women, New York, women". The actors auditioned using the "grab a spoon" scene, and many arrived in character with "lots of chest showing". As the Joey character was not developed much in the script, Matt LeBlanc just used his experience playing "this Italian, kind of dim character" from Vinnie & Bobby. He had at least eight auditions for the part, and in his final one read with Aniston and Cox. Vince Vaughn also read for the part.

Chandler and Phoebe had originally been written as more secondary characters who were just there to provide humor around the other four; Matthew Perry described Chandler in the pilot script as "an observer of other people's lives". They had become part of the core group by the time casting concluded. Crane believed that the part of Chandler, described in the character breakdown as "a droll, dry guy", would be the easiest to cast, though it proved more difficult than he initially hoped. Perry had previously worked with Kauffman and Crane on an episode of Dream On, and requested an audition when he identified with the character. He was turned down due to his involvement as a cast member in LAX 2194, a television pilot about airport baggage handlers in the future. After the producers of Friends saw LAX 2194, it became clear to them that it would not be picked up for a series, and Perry was granted an audition. He read for the role near the end of the casting period and got it in under a week. Before Perry was cast, Craig Bierko was first choice for the role. Bierko was a friend of Perry's, and Perry coached him for his audition to help him get to know what the Chandler character was like. Jon Cryer had also auditioned for the part. He was doing a play in London and read for a British casting director, though his audition tape did not arrive at Warner Bros. in time for him to be considered.

Many actresses who read for Phoebe arrived at the audition in character, wearing "bell bottoms and clunky shoes and nose rings". Kathy Griffin and Jane Lynch auditioned for the role. Lisa Kudrow won the role because the producers liked her as Ursula, the waitress in Mad About You. (Note: "The One with Two Parts, Part 1" establishes Ursula as Phoebe's twin sister.) She was second to be cast, though there was about a month between her and Schwimmer being signed on. Many of the actors seen by Moonves were "too theatrical" in performing comedy; Crane described the six successful actors as being the only ones who "nailed" their parts. The six actors met for the first time altogether at the read-through on April 28, 1994. John Allen Nelson and Clea Lewis guest-star as Paul and Franny, Monica's date and co-worker, respectively. Cynthia Mann appears as a Central Perk waitress. (Note: From "The One with the Dozen Lasagnas", Mann appears in a recurring role as Jasmine, Phoebe's masseuse co-worker. Some sources identify her character in the pilot as Jasmine, though she is not credited as that character.)

=== Filming ===
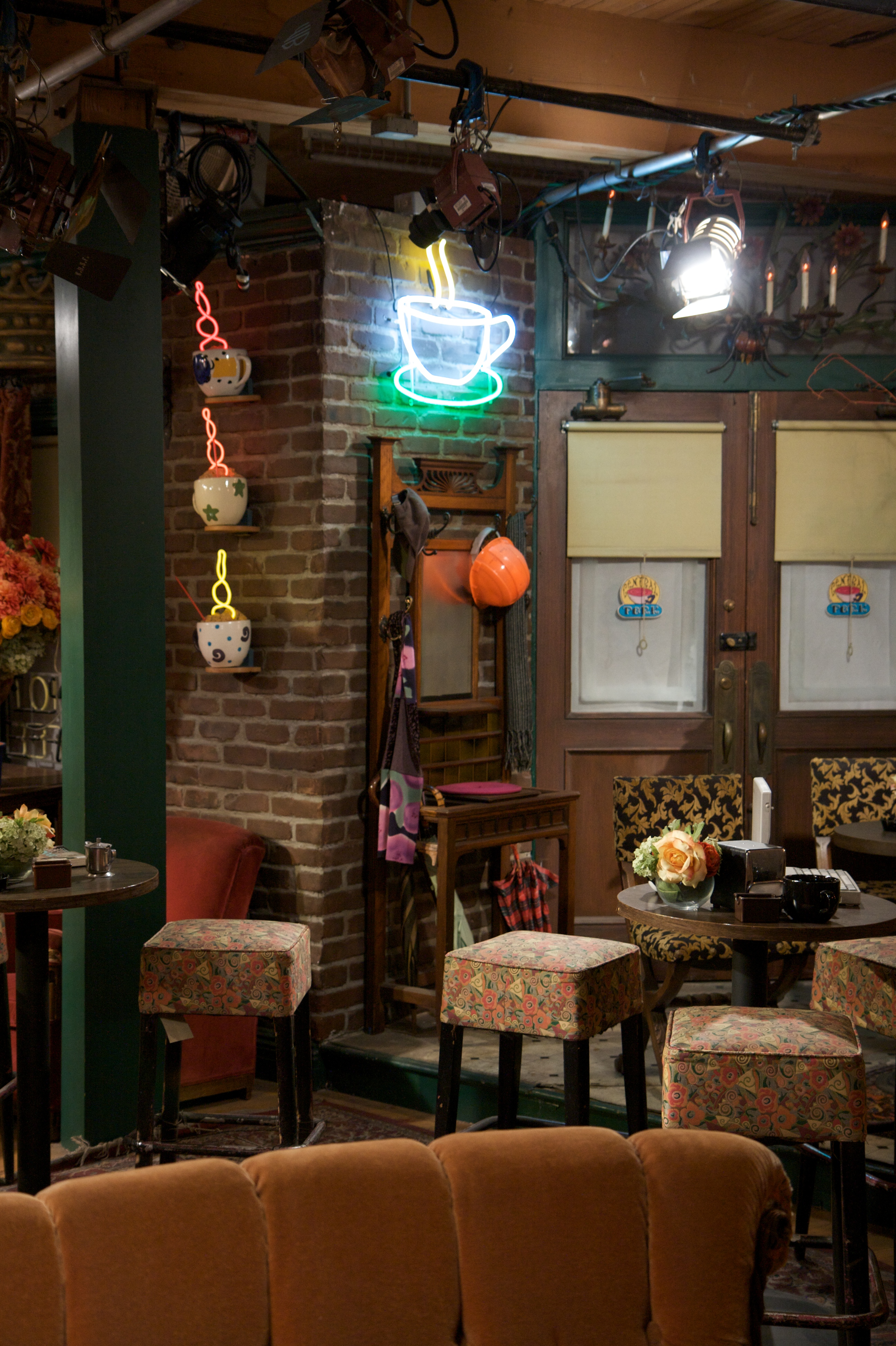
The set of Central Perk, where many scenes in the episode were filmed.

A dress rehearsal was held on May 2, two days before taping. Several NBC executives watched the rehearsal and were concerned that Monica did not care enough about Paul to sleep with him on their first date. NBC West Coast president Don Ohlmeyer believed that the audience would perceive her as "a slut". Crane, Kauffman and Warner Bros. executives disagreed, and surveyed the other people watching the rehearsal to support their position. Despite the audience agreeing with them, they had to take NBC's considerations into account in case they lost the commission; they rewrote Monica's lines to show that she cared about Paul. NBC also wanted a scene removed that implied the supposedly-impotent Paul was getting an erection, as it would violate network standards. Crane and Kauffman rewrote the scene and found they preferred the new version, as it made the scene "smart and subtler". They sought to protect other parts of the script, some major and some minor; NBC wanted two of the pilot's three storylines downplayed to subplots, but the writers were adamant that all three should carry equal weight. They also favored not cutting the "Mr. Potato Head" line. Their final script draft was completed on May 3.

The episode was taped on May 4 at Warner Bros.' studios in Burbank, California. A total of eight hours of material was filmed (two hours from each of the four cameras), which was edited down to 22 minutes under Bright's supervision. Bright submitted it to NBC on May 10, 72 hours before the fall schedule was announced. NBC ordered Bright to make further edits, which he completed at 1 a.m. on May 11. On May 12, NBC screened the finished pilot to focus groups, who gave positive but mixed reactions. The network announced the fall schedule on May 13 and ordered an additional 12 episodes of Friends for its first season. Crane and Kauffman immediately received telephone calls from writers' agents who wanted to get their clients jobs on the series.

== Reception ==
The episode was first broadcast on NBC on September 22, 1994, in the 8:30–9 p.m. (EST) timeslot. It ranked as the fifteenth-most-watched television show of the week, scoring 14.7/23 Nielsen rating (each point represented 954,000 households) and nearly 22 million viewers.

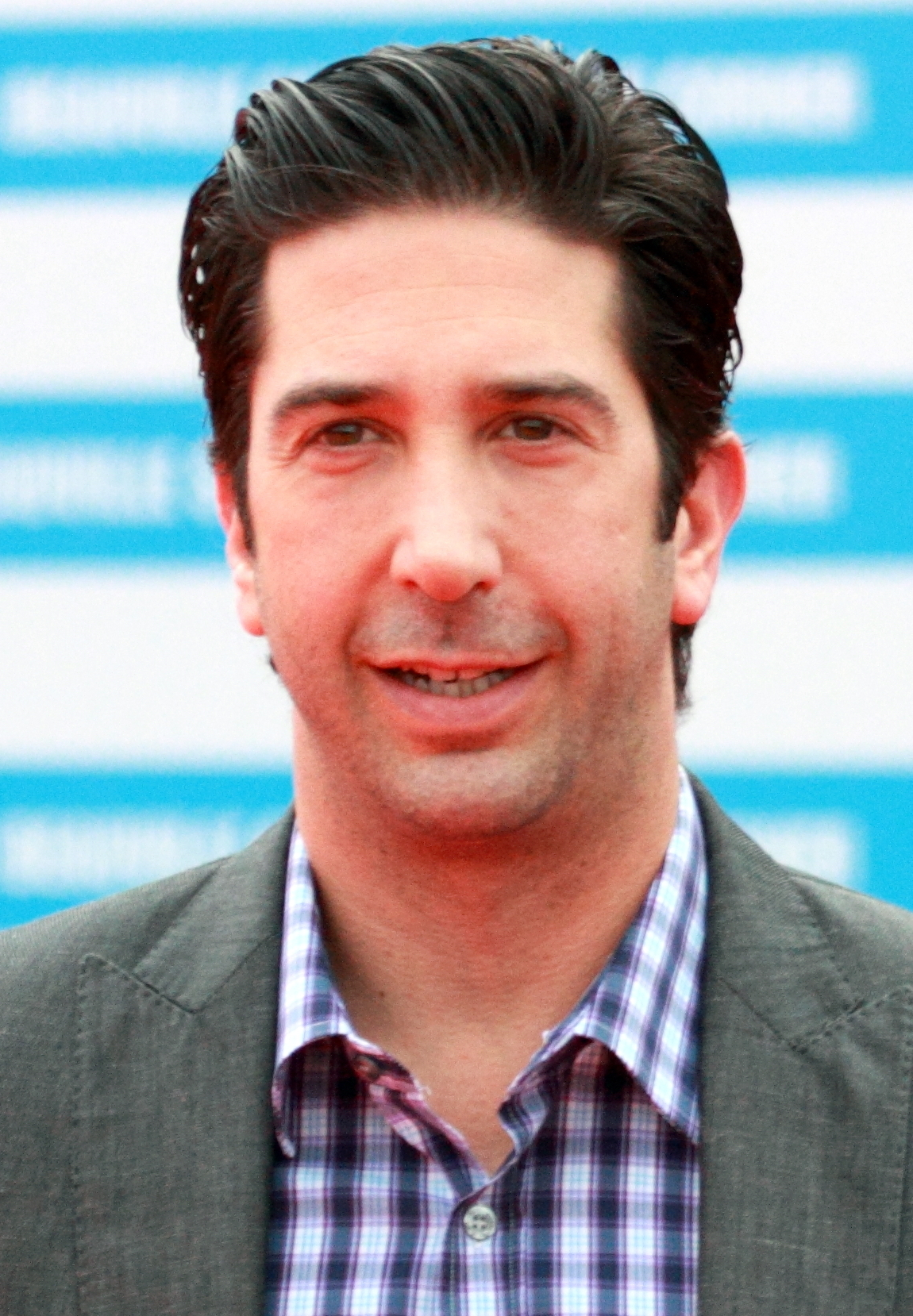
David Schwimmer received considerable praise

Critical reception towards the pilot episode was mixed. Critics likened the episode to Seinfeld and Ellen; Tom Feran in The Plain Dealer wrote that it traded "vaguely and less successfully on the hanging-out style of Seinfeld", and Ann Hodges of the Houston Chronicle called it "the new Seinfeld wannabe, but it will never be as funny as Seinfeld. Even as Seinfeld is now, which isn't as funny as it used to be". Hodges criticized the "stiflingly dull social circle" as "short to the point of painful in brainpower". Robert Bianco in the Pittsburgh Post-Gazette wrote that the "constant comic bantering grows a little tired, just as it would if it ever actually happened in real life", and questioned why the six characters had so much free time to talk about dates. In the Los Angeles Daily News, Ray Richmond, who had also seen the following two episodes, called the cast a "likable, youth ensemble" with "good chemistry". He added that while Friends was "one of the brighter comedies of the new season", the pilot was "very weak". Diane Holloway for the Austin American-Statesman questioned Friends' billing as a "sophisticated comedy", writing, "What's sophisticated about a guy who dreams his penis is a telephone?" She called the scene where Monica discovers Paul's impotence was a lie the least funny part of the episode, though conceded that the episode as a whole did have some funny moments. Robert P. Laurence wrote in The San Diego Union-Tribune that "A lot happens, but you'll still get the feeling you've seen Friends before", calling it "Seinfeld Plus Two. Or Ellen Plus Five." In the Chicago Sun-Times, Ginny Holbert rated the episode three stars, and wrote "The clever series [...] stars an appealing group of actors who are just a bit funnier and better-looking than your average friend" but that Joey and Rachel's characteristics were under-developed.

The Los Angeles Times called it "flat-out the best comedy series of the new season". Variety's Tony Scott had optimistic hopes for the series; he enjoyed the premise but was concerned that dialogue from the writers of Dream On should be "snappier". Scott was also concerned that the Monica storyline set a bad example for younger viewers; "Friends touts promiscuity and offers liberal samples of an openness that borders on empty-headedness". He singled out Cox and Schwimmer as the best actors of the ensemble. Robert Bianco was complimentary of Schwimmer, calling him "terrific". He also praised the female leads, but wrote that Perry's role as Chandler was "undefined" and that LeBlanc was "relying too much on the same brain-dead stud routine that was already tired the last two times he tried it". Entertainment Weekly rates the episode B+ and states that "After 22 minutes, these six people are believably set up as lifelong buddies". Ross's line, "Do the words 'Billy, Don't Be a Hero' mean anything to you?" is singled out as the best line of the episode. The authors of Friends Like Us: The Unofficial Guide to Friends call it a "good, solid start to the series" but "the regular cast (particularly Perry and Schwimmer) might be trying just a little too hard". Schwimmer recalls enjoying the physical humor involving Ross, particularly the scene where Ross greets Rachel and opens an umbrella on her.

The episode was syndicated for the first time on September 21, 1998. Several deleted scenes were restored to the episode, bringing its total running time to 37 minutes, for a one-hour timeslot. It gained a rating of 5.8/10, averaged across 40 stations. This made Friends the third-highest-rated off-network syndicated sitcom to air at that time, behind Home Improvement and Seinfeld.
