= The Last One (Friends) =

- Friends episodes
- Episode nos.: Season 10; Episodes 17 and 18
- Directed by: Kevin S. Bright
- Written by: David Crane; Marta Kauffman
- Production codes: 176266; 176267
- Original air date: May 6, 2004
- Running time: Part 1: 22 min; Part 2: 22 min

Guest appearances
- Anna Faris as Erica; James Michael Tyler as Gunther; Paul Rudd as Mike Hannigan; Anthony Cistaro as Gate Attendant; Jason Kravits as Man in Cab; Brian Palermo as Airline Representative; Jim Rash as Nervous Passenger; John Rubinstein as The Doctor

Episode chronology
← Previous "The One with Rachel's Going Away Party"	Next → —
- Friends season 10

"The Last One" is the series finale of the American sitcom Friends. Originally shown in its entirety, the episode's two parts were classified as the seventeenth and eighteenth episodes of the tenth season, and the 235th and the 236th episodes overall. It was written by series creators David Crane and Marta Kauffman and directed by executive producer Kevin S. Bright. The series finale first aired on NBC in the United States on May 6, 2004, when it was watched by 52.5 million viewers, making it the most watched entertainment telecast in six years and the fifth most watched overall television series finale in American history as well as the most watched episode from any television series throughout the 2000s decade on American television. In Canada, the finale aired simultaneously on May 6, 2004, on Global, and was viewed by 5.16 million viewers, becoming the second-highest viewed episode of the series.

The series finale closes several long-running storylines. Ross Geller (David Schwimmer) confesses his love for Rachel Green (Jennifer Aniston), and they decide to resume their relationship; and Monica Geller (Courteney Cox) and Chandler Bing (Matthew Perry) adopt twins and move to the suburbs. The episode's final scene shows the group leaving Monica and Chandler's apartment for the final time and going for one last cup of coffee together.

Prior to writing the episode, Crane, Kauffman and Bright watched finales from other sitcoms for the inspiration. Kauffman found that she liked the ones that stayed true to the series. Filming took place at Warner Bros. Studios in Burbank, California; part one was filmed on January 16, and part two on January 23, making it the only episode that was filmed in 2004. The series finale was well received by critics and the cast members.

== Plot ==
=== Part 1 ===
Phoebe Buffay and Joey Tribbiani pack the belongings of Monica Geller and Chandler Bing, who have accompanied Erica to the hospital. Rachel Green leaves Ross Geller's bedroom after their apparent reunion in the previous episode. Erica gives birth to twins, much to the surprise of Monica and Chandler, who were expecting only one child. At his apartment, Joey shows Phoebe his house-warming gift for Monica and Chandler: a chick and duckling to replace the ones that died. Ross arrives and confesses to the pair that he slept with Rachel. Rachel emerges from her bedroom and, to his disappointment, tells Ross that their night together was "the perfect way to say goodbye".

Later at the Central Perk café, Phoebe convinces Ross to tell Rachel how he feels about her before she leaves for her new job in Paris. As he is about to tell her, Central Perk manager Gunther confesses his love for Rachel. Back at Monica and Chandler's apartment, Ross decides not to tell Rachel, for fear of rejection. She prepares to leave to catch her flight, but waits long enough for Monica and Chandler to return with the twins, named Erica (after their biological mother) and Jack (after Monica and Ross's father). After Rachel leaves, Ross has a change of heart, and Phoebe takes him in her taxi to follow Rachel to the airport.

=== Part 2 ===
Joey returns to his apartment to fetch the chick and the duck he was hiding, but finds they have become trapped in the foosball table. Chandler and Joey decide to break it open with a crowbar and mallet when they cannot find any other way of getting the birds out, but find themselves too emotionally attached to the foosball table to break it, but Monica does it gleefully. After they retrieve the birds, Chandler suggests Joey keep them, and the two reaffirm their friendship with a long, tense hug.

Phoebe's reckless driving gets her and Ross to JFK Airport and, after buying a ticket to get past security, they search the information boards for Rachel's flight number. When they cannot locate her flight on any of the information boards, Ross calls and checks the number with Monica but discovers they are at the wrong airport; as Rachel is flying out of nearby Newark Airport. Phoebe calls Rachel, who has already boarded her flight, to stall her for time. When a passenger overhears Phoebe saying there is a problem with the fictitious "left phalange" of the plane, he gets off the plane, prompting everyone else to leave.

Phoebe and Ross arrive at the airport as Rachel boards the plane again. Ross tells her he loves her, but she is unable to deal with his confession and gets on the plane anyway. A dejected Ross returns home and finds a message from Rachel on the phone. As she realizes that she loves him too, she tries to get off the plane as a flight attendant tries to force her to sit down. The message cuts off and Ross frantically tries fixing the answering machine, wondering out loud if she got off the plane. From behind him, Rachel appears and says she did, and they get back together for good. The following morning, the friends gather in Monica and Chandler's empty apartment and reminisce about how all of them had lived there at one point or another. With some time remaining before Monica and Chandler leave for their new house, the six all leave their keys to the apartment on the kitchen counter and decide to go for one last cup of coffee together, to which Chandler quips, "Where?" and they all laugh as they head down the hallway. The final shot shows the empty apartment, slowly panning around from the living space to the front door as Jefferson Airplane's "Embryonic Journey" plays.

== Production ==
=== Writing and music ===
The series' creators completed the first draft of the hour-long finale in January 2004, four months prior to its airing on May 6. Before writing the episode, David Crane, Marta Kauffman and Kevin S. Bright decided to watch the series finales of other sitcoms, paying attention to what worked and what did not. Kauffman found that they liked the ones which stayed true to the series, and they found the finale of The Mary Tyler Moore Show to be the gold standard. The writers had difficulty writing the finale, and spent several days thinking about the final scene without being able to write a word. Crane said that they did not want to do "something high concept, or take the show out of the show".

The music playing as the camera pans across the empty apartment at the end of the episode is "Embryonic Journey" by Jefferson Airplane. The song "Yellow Ledbetter" by the band Pearl Jam is also featured in the episode—after Rachel boards the plane for the first time—making it the first Pearl Jam song to be licensed for a television show. A spokesperson for the group said it was, "simply a matter of the show's producers asking permission".

=== Filming ===
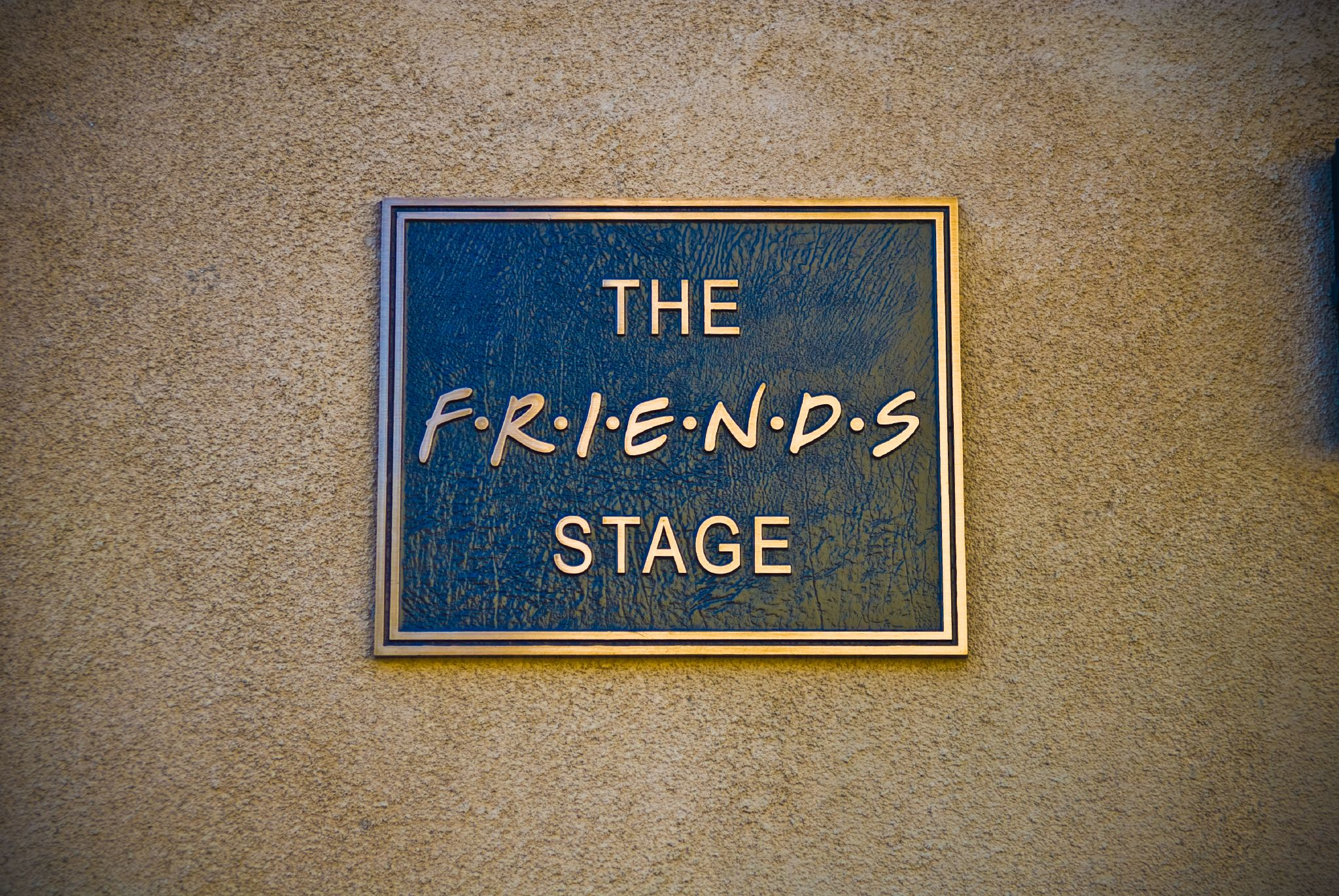
After filming on the finale concluded, Stage 24 at Warner Bros. Studios, where Friends had been filmed since Season 2, was renamed "The Friends Stage".

The episode was filmed in Burbank, California on Stage 24 at Warner Bros. Studios, where Friends had been filmed since its second season. The first part was taped on January 16, and the second on January 23, 2004. After the series finale, Stage 24 was renamed "The Friends Stage".

A month before the filming of the final episode, Aniston said that with each episode it got "harder just to read the lines." She explained that the cast was "all just nerves and raw emotions ... No one knows how to feel. We may need to be sedated on the last night." The producers promised a tearful ending, and the cast admitted their crying was not faked when they filmed their scenes. LeBlanc revealed it had been too much for him and the rest of the cast; he said Kudrow started crying first, and when he looked at Aniston and Cox they also appeared emotional. Schwimmer, who LeBlanc thought was the "consummate professional", was also upset, so LeBlanc "just lost it." Maggie Wheeler, who played Chandler's "on and off" girlfriend Janice, told People, "the entire cast had to go back and have their makeup redone before starting," and that Perry broke the tension by saying, "Somebody is gonna get fired." Perry told the New York Daily News that he did not cry, "but I felt like I was about to for like seven hours."

Although it was planned that some key scenes of the episode would be filmed without an audience to avoid leaks of plot spoilers, the producers decided not to worry about the issue and filmed it all in front of the live studio audience. The producers also instigated the rumor that multiple endings would be filmed; in fact, only one was planned and shot.

At the start of each Friends episode filming, the cast would ordinarily be introduced to the studio audience one at a time, but this time the cast headed out for their pre-curtain bow together. "That made me cry," said Diane Newman, who was the script supervisor of the show. Among the specially invited audience of the taping were Hank Azaria, who played Phoebe's scientist boyfriend David in several episodes over the years; David Arquette, who filmed his then-wife Cox and the others backstage with a video camera; and Wheeler. Missing was Brad Pitt, Aniston's then-husband; Pitt told the producers he wanted to be surprised when the finale aired on television. Although some guests were invited, around 75% of the studio audience were 'ordinary' members of the public so that their reactions would be congruous with the rest of the series. However, friends, family and colleagues of the cast and crew served as extras throughout the episode.

== Reception ==
=== Promotion, ratings and awards ===
"It may have been impossible for any one episode to live up to the hype and expectations built up around the Friends finale, but this hour probably came as close as fans could have reasonably hoped. Ultimately, the two-hour package did exactly what it was supposed to do. It wrapped up the story while reminding us why we liked the show and will miss it."
—Robert Bianco of USA Today on the series finale.

NBC heavily promoted the series finale, which was preceded by weeks of hype. Viewing parties were organized by local NBC affiliates around the United States, including an event at Universal CityWalk featuring a special broadcast of the finale on an outdoor Astrovision screen. It was shown in New York City, where over 3,000 people watched it on big screens in parks. The finale was the subject of two episodes of Dateline NBC, one of which ran for two hours. Prior to the airing of the episode, a one-hour retrospective of clips from previous episodes was shown. Following the finale, The Tonight Show with Jay Leno was filmed on the set of the Friends' Central Perk café, which featured the series' cast as guests. The advertising rates for the finale averaged $2 million for 30 seconds of commercial time. This currently remains as the largest advertising rate ever for a sitcom, breaking the previous record held by the Seinfeld finale at $1.7 million.

The finale was watched by 52.5 million American viewers, making it the most watched entertainment telecast in six years, and the most watched episode of the decade 2000s on American television. The Friends finale was the fourth most watched overall series finale in American television history, behind the finales of M*A*S*H, Cheers and Seinfeld, which were watched by 105.9, 84.4 and 76.3 million viewers, respectively. The episode was also the second most watched episode of Friends, behind "The One After the Superbowl", which attracted 52.92 million viewers. The retrospective episode was watched by just under 36 million viewers, and the finale was the second most-watched television show of the year, behind only Super Bowl XXXVIII.

The episode was nominated for two Primetime Emmy Awards at the 56th Primetime Emmy Awards for Outstanding Multi-Camera Sound Mixing for a Series or Special and Outstanding Multi-Camera Picture Editing for a Series, but lost to the final season of Frasier in both categories.

=== Critical reviews ===
Robert Bianco of USA Today described the finale as entertaining and satisfying, and praised it for deftly mixing emotion and humor while showcasing each of the stars. Sarah Rodman of the Boston Herald praised Aniston and Schwimmer for their acting, but felt that their characters' reunion "felt a bit too neat, even if it was what most of the show's legions of fans wanted." Newsday's Noel Holston called the episode "sweet and dumb and satisfying," while Ken Parish Perkins of the Fort Worth Star-Telegram gave the finale a B grade, calling it "more touching than comical, more satisfying in terms of closure than knee-slappingly funny."

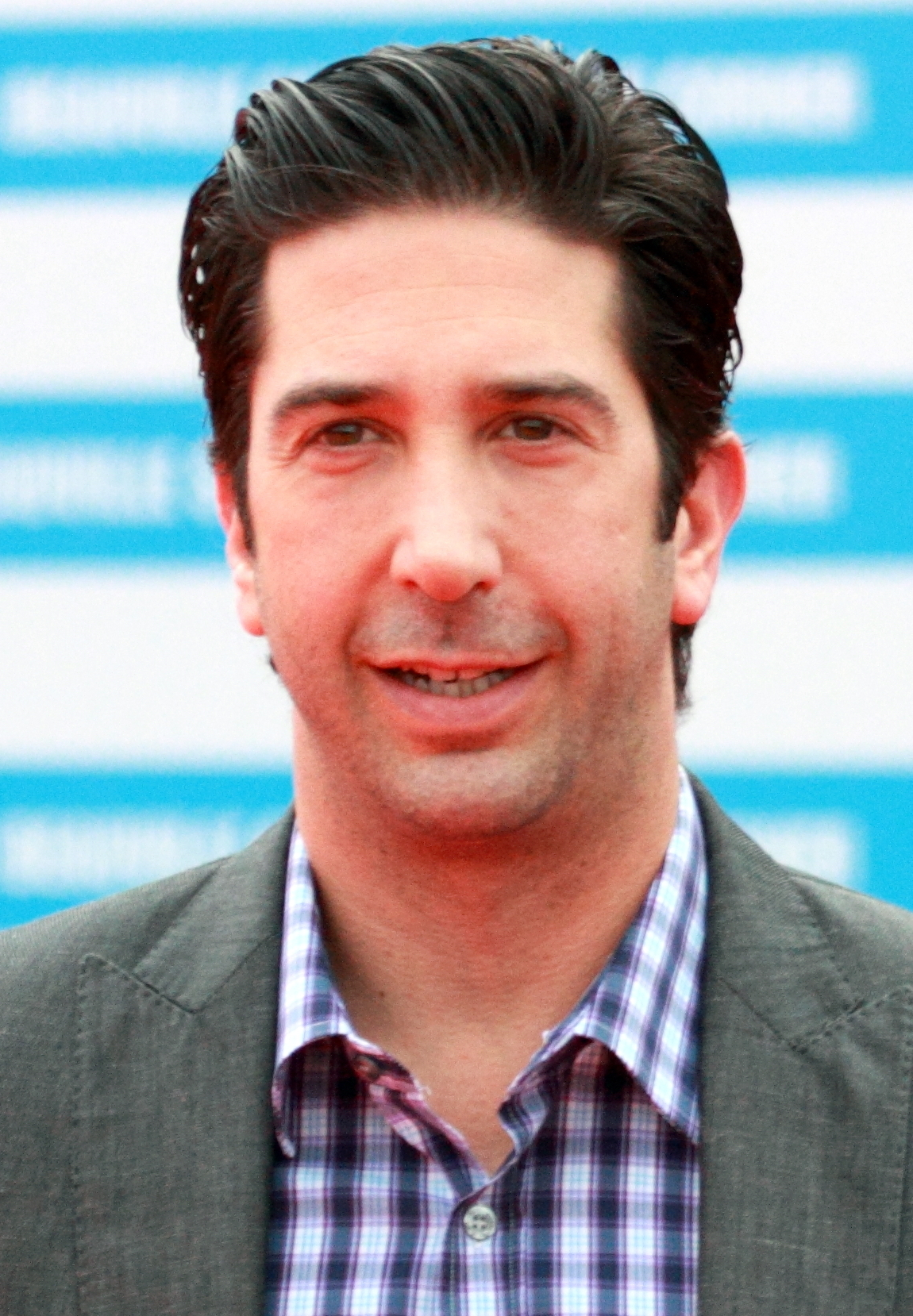
The finale was "exactly" what David Schwimmer had hoped for.

An editorial in USA Today highlighted the view of many critics who found problem with the aging cast, commenting, "Friends was getting creaky even as it remained popular." Heather Havrilesky of Salon.com said that despite the "nauseating hype and the disappointing season and the lackluster finale, it's important to remember what a great show this was for such a very long time." Roger Catlin of The Hartford Courant felt that newcomers to the series would be "surprised at how laughless the affair could be, and how nearly every strained gag depends on the sheer stupidity of its characters."

Retrospectively, reviews for the finale have leaned mostly positive. In 2023, The Ringer named it the 21st greatest TV finale of the 21st century so far, calling it "proof there's no sense messing with a good thing. It hands us heartwarming moments on a platter with all the ease and charm that made the show so beloved, saving Ross and Rachel's dramatic reunion (and a "we were on a break!" joke) for the very last beat." It was also ranked as one of the 25 best series finales ever by Entertainment Weekly in 2024.

=== Response from the staff ===
The cast members reportedly got together in Los Angeles; David Schwimmer, who plays Ross, said, "It's exactly what I had hoped. We all end up with a sense of a new beginning and the audience has a sense that it's a new chapter in the lives of all these characters." At the taping of the episode, the cast and crew passed around yearbooks, custom-made by the production staff, and signed them for each other. The cast gave the producers inscribed Cartier SA watches, while the producers gave the cast Neil Lane jewelry. As the sets were broken down, the cast and crew each got a chunk of the street outside Central Perk in a glass box as a keepsake.

There were three separate wrap parties—a dinner at the Aniston-Pitt residence on January 19, 2004, a sit down at cast hangout Il Sole in West Hollywood on January 22, and a big party for 1,000 guests on January 24 at Los Angeles' Park Plaza Hotel. At the party at the Park Plaza Hotel, The Rembrandts performed the theme song of Friends, "I'll Be There for You", and the cast gave a re-enactment of the pilot episode's first scene.

== See also ==
- Leave the World Behind - the film references this particular Friends episode.
