= Chandler Bing =

Fictional character from the American sitcom Friends

- Friends character
- Matthew Perry as Chandler Bing
- First appearance: "The Pilot" (1994)
- Last appearance: "The Last One" (2004)
- Created by: David Crane; Marta Kauffman
- Portrayed by: Matthew Perry; Joshua Duvall Preston (young)

In-universe information
- Full name: Chandler Muriel Bing
- Occupation: Statistical analysis and data reconfiguration (seasons 1–9); Junior advertising copywriter (seasons 9–10)
- Family: Charles Bing (father); Nora Tyler Bing (mother)
- Spouse: Monica Geller (m. 2001)
- Children: Jack Bing; Erica Bing
- Relatives: Edna (aunt); Glen (cousin); Ross Geller (brother-in-law)
- Nationality: American
- Birth date: April 8, 1968

Chandler Muriel Bing is a fictional character from the NBC sitcom Friends, portrayed by Matthew Perry. Chandler was born to Nora Tyler Bing, an erotic romance novelist, and Charles Bing, a gay female impersonator and star of a Las Vegas drag show called "Viva Las Gay-gas" as Helena Handbasket. It is revealed in the first season that he went to an all-boys high school.

Chandler's best friends are his roommate, Joey Tribbiani, and Ross Geller, his college roommate. He met Ross's sister, Monica Geller, and her friend Rachel Green while visiting Ross's parents' house. Chandler was the first person to know about Ross's love for Rachel. He moved to New York City and lives across the hall from Monica. He meets Phoebe Buffay through her. Chandler has a very good sense of humor and is notoriously sarcastic, which he credits as a defense mechanism developed during his parents' divorce when he was a child. He is the most financially secure member of the Friends. He suffers from commitment issues, but he later marries Monica at the end of the seventh season. In the tenth season, Chandler and Monica adopt twins, Jack and Erica.

== Appearances ==
Chandler works in "statistical analysis and data reconfiguration," but loathes it, although it pays well.

Chandler was Ross Geller's roommate in college. Chandler met his future wife Monica Geller while celebrating Thanksgiving with the Geller family during his first year at college. On a tip from Monica, Chandler later moved to Apartment number 19 in Greenwich Village, Manhattan, across the hall from Monica and her roommate Phoebe Buffay. After his roommate Kip moves out, actor Joey Tribbiani moves in with Chandler, who becomes his best friend.

Ross and Chandler have been best friends since their freshman year in college, where they were roommates. They were in a band together called “Way No Way”. Chandler also learned "Hug and Roll" from Ross when he was dating Janice.

Until moving in with Monica, Chandler shared an apartment with Joey. Chandler and Joey's apartment is an important focal point for the series as one of the few meeting areas of the gang. The two form a close and enduring friendship, and get into many humorous situations. In the pilot episode of the sequel series Joey, Joey's sister Gina briefly expresses her belief that Joey and Chandler were a gay couple.

When Chandler first meets Joey and interviews him as a roommate, the two start off on the wrong foot when Joey says that he is "cool with the gay thing" (Joey assuming that Chandler is gay). Chandler initially chooses Eric, a fashion photographer with a porn-star sister as his roommate, but after their eccentric neighbor Mr. Heckles (Larry Hankin) tells Eric that he is Chandler's new roommate and is able to open Chandler's unlocked door, Eric leaves. Chandler assumes that Eric simply did not turn up, and he gives the keys to Joey, but soon finds that they have a lot in common, including a fondness for Baywatch and beer. Chandler often supports Joey throughout the show, by always supporting Joey at every step of his roller-coaster of a career in show business besides paying the rent, paying for Joey's head-shots, buying most of the food, and even giving money to Joey for his numerous dates. Even when buying a new house for his own family, Chandler reveals that he is going to have a 'Joey room' in it for him.

The relationship between the two is balanced: Joey looks to Chandler as his intellectual superior, while Chandler acknowledges Joey as the more confident counterpart, especially when it comes to romance and Chandler often takes advice from Joey on how to date women.

Chandler and Rachel originally did not like each other, but grew to become good friends. Rachel does not understand Chandler's sarcasm early in the series, and even later on has a hard time appreciating his sense of humor, as she acknowledges in the final episode. In "The One with All the Cheesecakes", Chandler and Rachel steal and share the cheesecake which originally belonged to their downstairs neighbor. Rachel, who works for Ralph Lauren Corporation, is also the one who helps Chandler pick out his wedding suit. Rachel also sets up Chandler with her boss Joanna (Alison La Placa). Rachel and Chandler never have any romantic relationships apart from a glance back to their time in college when they made out. In "The One with the Flashback," Rachel is shown briefly fantasizing about Chandler at the end of the episode.

Chandler and Phoebe are good friends. Although Phoebe mocks Chandler frequently, they sometimes are goofy and have fun with one another. In "The One with the Metaphorical Tunnel", Phoebe and Chandler play hide and seek. They also play games, like coming up with superhero names and reclining the Barcaloungers like cowboys. They share a duet of "Endless Love" at the end of one episode, when Chandler is sad after a breakup with his on-off girlfriend Janice (Maggie Wheeler). In "The One Where Everyone Finds Out", she tries to trick him into believing that she is attracted to him, but Monica tells him that Phoebe finds him charming in a "sexless" way, indicating that any hints of romance are jokes. Phoebe is the initial reason that Chandler quit smoking in "The One with the Thumb", after an argument between the group about his smoking. He is leaving the apartment when she offers him $7,000 to never smoke again.

Chandler is brash, zany, and estranged from both of his parents. He suffers from commitment issues, brought on by growing up in a broken home with no idea of what a stable marriage looks like, can be neurotic and extremely defensive, with humor as his shield. Chandler also views everything associated with his parents' divorce in a negative light, specifically Thanksgiving when his parents revealed their separation over a turkey as his father planned to run away with the house boy.

Both of Chandler's parents are extremely promiscuous, and he has made several allusions to having caught them during sexual acts. Most of these involve his father with other men. Among other things, he alludes to having witnessed orgies by the time he was seven years old, and playing "the far left" background dancer during his father's rendition of "It's Raining Men" when he was growing up. His mother Nora is a world famous writer of erotic novels, which is demonstrated when Rachel's short-term boyfriend Paolo – who is Italian and barely speaks any English – is shown to know her.

Chandler began smoking when he was nine years old after his parents announced their divorce. Chandler is first seen smoking during the first season and is chastised by his friends for breaking his non-smoking streak of three years. He does a fairly good job at controlling his habit throughout the series' run, although a few times he cannot resist temptation and has a single cigarette or just a single drag off someone else's. His only major relapse occurs in season 9 when he stays in Oklahoma four days a week for work and smoked "three cartons in three days" because all his colleagues lit up during work meetings. He promises Monica never to smoke again, and is not seen smoking in the series after this point. But, there is evidence of him still smoking in Season 10 when Monica caught the smell of cigarettes on him after he came home from seeing the house Monica and Chandler buy in Westchester. Chandler does not deny the allegation.

Chandler's main catchphrase is starting sentences with "Could that BE any more..."

== Development ==
=== Relationships ===
At Ross's wedding in London, Monica and Chandler sleep together and decide to begin dating. They try to keep their relationship secret, as they are unsure about how the others would react. Eventually, however, they all find out and give their blessing. Things briefly become strained when Monica reveals that she had initially been looking for Joey for a one-night-stand, but they reconcile. Their wedding takes place during the finale of the seventh season. In the final episode of the series, Monica and Chandler adopt twins.

Before his relationship with Monica, Chandler has an on-and-off relationship with Janice Litman. She is a regular feature in his life, even though he regrets dating her and keeps ending their relationship throughout the first season. He calls her in the second season out of fear of being alone, only to find out she is married and pregnant. In the second-season finale, they meet after unknowingly chatting with each other online when her husband cheats on her, and they quickly get back together. The relationship lasts through the first few episodes of the third season, with Chandler genuinely infatuated by her, but when she kisses her husband whilst in the midst of her divorce, Chandler urges her to go back to her husband, not wanting to destroy her family. Janice makes further appearances later in the series, after they have both married other people.

Kathy (Paget Brewster) makes an appearance in the fourth season of Friends. Chandler sees her in Central Perk and asks the gang if he should ask her out, only to learn that she was already waiting for a date with Joey. Chandler and Kathy then fall for each other even though she is dating Joey. This causes huge friction between Joey and Chandler, but this is resolved and Chandler and Kathy get together and begin dating. She is an actress, and Chandler gets extremely paranoid when she shares a sex scene with her co-star, prompting a big fight between the two. Chandler's paranoia drives Kathy into having an affair with the co-star, and Chandler and Kathy split up.

== Career ==
For most of the series, Chandler works in statistical analysis and data reconfiguration, although he grows to loathe the job. He succeeds in transitioning to a junior copywriter position by the end of the series. Despite disliking his initial job, Chandler stays because they keep giving him promotions and raises, eventually placing him as boss to his former coworkers. His friends do not understand what he does; during the contest for Monica and Rachel's apartment, Rachel desperately guesses "Transponster" for his job title (to which Monica replies in anguish, "THAT'S NOT EVEN A WORD!"). This results in Chandler and Joey winning their apartment.

In the episode "The One Where Emma Cries", Chandler falls asleep during a meeting and on waking, realizes that he had agreed to head the new division in Tulsa. Chandler quits his job on Christmas so that he can fly home to New York to be with Monica. Monica helps Chandler secure a job in advertising through an old colleague of hers. Much to Chandler's dismay, he begins as an unpaid intern. However, his more mature approach eventually pays off, and he secures a full-time job in the business as a junior copywriter, which he enjoys much more than his previous career.

== See also ==
- List of Friends and Joey characters
