= Rachel Green =

- Friends character
- Jennifer Aniston as Rachel Green
- First appearance: "The Pilot" (1994)
- Last appearance: "The Last One" (2004)
- Created by: David Crane; Marta Kauffman
- Portrayed by: Jennifer Aniston

In-universe information
- Full name: Rachel Karen Green
- Occupation: Waitress at Central Perk; Assistant at Fortunata Fashions; Buyer and personal shopper at Bloomingdale's; Executive at Ralph Lauren; Louis Vuitton
- Family: Leonard Green (father); Sandra Green (mother); Jill Green (sister); Amy Green (sister); Ida Green (grandmother)
- Spouse: Ross Geller (m. 1999; div. 1999)
- Children: Emma Geller-Green (b. 2002)
- Religion: Cultural Judaism
- Home: Monica's apartment (seasons 1–6); Phoebe's apartment (seasons 6–7); Joey's apartment (seasons 7–8, 9–10); Ross' apartment (seasons 8–9, 10)
- Nationality: American
- Birth date: May 5, 1971

Rachel Karen Green (Note: In some episodes of the series, the character’s surname appears spelled “Greene”. For example, her surname is spelled “Greene” on her invitation to Ross and Emily’s wedding and on her office door at Ralph Lauren, whereas credits and official press materials from Warner Bros. spell it “Green”.) is a fictional character from the American sitcom Friends (1994–2004). Portrayed by actress Jennifer Aniston, she was created for the show by its creators, David Crane and Marta Kauffman, and appears in all 236 episodes across 10 seasons. Introduced in the pilot as a naïve runaway bride, she relocates to New York City, where she moves in with her childhood best friend, Monica Geller. Over the course of the series, Rachel evolves from a spoiled rich girl into an independent fashion executive and single mother. Her on-again, off-again relationship with Monica's brother, Ross, forms a central storyline of the series.

Rachel was the most difficult character to cast. Several actresses were considered, including Courteney Cox, who preferred the role of Monica, while Aniston had also been considered for the role ultimately given to Cox. Aniston had previously appeared in several unsuccessful sitcoms, and her contract for the CBS sitcom Muddling Through initially cast doubt on whether she would be able to remain on Friends, until the series was cancelled shortly before Friends premiered. Her $1 million per episode salary for seasons nine and ten established her as one of the highest-paid television actresses of all time, which was recognized by Guinness World Records. Rachel received generally positive reception throughout Friends’ run, although some of her storylines were criticized. Aniston’s performance was widely praised, earning her an Emmy Award for Outstanding Lead Actress in a Comedy Series and a Golden Globe Award for Best Actress in a Television Series – Musical or Comedy.

Rachel's popularity established her as one of the show's breakout characters. She is also regarded as a style icon due to her influence on women's fashion during the 1990s and beyond, with her first-season haircut spawning a global trend and becoming one of the most popular hairstyles in popular culture. Rachel is considered to be Aniston's breakout role, credited with making her the show's most famous cast member and launching her film career.

== Role ==
Rachel Green is introduced in the Friends pilot as a runaway bride who leaves her fiancé, Barry Farber (Mitchell Whitfield), at the altar upon realizing she does not love him. When her father refuses to financially support her, she seeks refuge in New York City and moves in with her childhood friend Monica Geller (Courteney Cox). There, she meets Monica's friends Phoebe Buffay (Lisa Kudrow), Joey Tribbiani (Matt LeBlanc), and Chandler Bing (Matthew Perry), (Note: Although the pilot heavily implies that Rachel and Chandler are meeting for the first time, subsequent episodes reveal through flashbacks that the characters had actually met before.) and reacquaints with Monica's brother, Ross Geller (David Schwimmer), who has harbored romantic feelings for her since high school. Unable to rely on her parents' wealth, Rachel begins her journey towards financial independence by working as a waitress at Central Perk, the coffeehouse frequented by the group, despite being notably unskilled at and frustrated with the job. From there, much of the series focuses on Rachel’s efforts to find her passion, pursue her career goals, climb the corporate ladder, and navigate her romantic relationships. Her evolution from a spoiled “daddy’s girl” to a self-sufficient working woman was one of the series’ key character arcs. Starting around season three, Rachel pursues a career in fashion, beginning with entry-level positions at Fortunata Fashions before securing a job at Bloomingdale's, where she works as a buyer and personal shopper. She eventually becomes a buyer at Ralph Lauren, where she remains for the rest of the series. When Ralph Lauren fires her after discovering that she interviewed for a position at Gucci, a former colleague helps her secure a job offer at Louis Vuitton in Paris.

Rachel has several romantic relationships throughout the course of Friends. Her relationship with Ross is a central storyline throughout the series. Various obstacles, including poor timing, missed opportunities, and other relationships, keep them apart for much of the series. After learning Ross is in love with her at the end of the first season, she reciprocates but he has already begun dating someone else, initiating their on-again, off-again relationship that spans the entire show. Their relationship includes notable landmarks such as Ross choosing Rachel over his girlfriend at the time, Ross' frustration with Rachel's busy work schedule and companionship with a male coworker, their breakup over a disagreement while they were on a "break" from dating each other, and several moments of both hostility towards each other and reconciliation, during which time the friendship dynamic of the group struggles. Ross marries her boss' niece Emily (Helen Baxendale) despite accidentally saying Rachel's name during their wedding vows, but divorces Emily once she demands he stops being friends with Rachel. They drunkenly marry in Las Vegas during season five, eventually divorce after failing to have their marriage annulled, and later co-parent their daughter Emma, born in season eight following a one-night stand. In season nine, Rachel briefly dates Joey, but they end their relationship in season ten after realizing they are better as friends. Despite receiving a job offer in France, Rachel ultimately decides to stay in New York and rekindle her relationship with Ross in the series finale, de-boarding her flight at the last minute.

By the series' conclusion, Rachel achieves significant personal and professional growth. Her decision to reunite with Ross in the final episode brings her story full circle, solidifying her evolution from a dependent individual into a self-assured and independent woman. Post-series material, such as the spin-off Joey, suggests that she and Ross eventually remarry.

== Development ==
=== Creation ===
Television writers David Crane and Marta Kauffman pitched Friends to then-NBC president Warren Littlefield as a sitcom about "that special time in your life when your friends are your family". Inspired by their own experiences as young people living in New York, they based its main characters on their friends and aspects of their own personal lives. Rachel Green was conceived as a young woman unprepared for adulthood. Kauffman said the writers had always wanted Rachel to evolve from a woman who did not know how to do any job into “a woman who learned to partially define herself by her work”. In earlier drafts of the pilot, the character was named "Rachel Robbins". Kauffman confirmed that Rachel was intended to be Jewish, which she believed was reflected in the character’s full name and other creative choices, though she did not write her as strongly affiliated with specific religious practices or identity.

Despite being an ensemble series, the writers gave Rachel the pilot’s most prominent storyline. Although the pilot had always involved Rachel leaving her groom at the altar, an earlier version included a scene in which her parents arrived. Other elements from the original pilot script that were omitted or rewritten include Monica expressing stronger resentment towards Rachel over her privileged upbringing and being more reluctant to become her roommate; Rachel ruining the group’s telenovela game by translating it; the absence of her “shoe” and “purse” metaphor; and the character interviewing for positions at Chandler’s workplace and Bloomingdale's before ultimately being hired at Central Perk.

Before deciding on Rachel and Ross, the writers had originally intended for Joey and Monica to be the show’s main couple, but pivoted after seeing Aniston’s chemistry with Schwimmer in the pilot. Their relationship permanently shifted starting with the first-season finale "The One Where Rachel Finds Out", in which Rachel finally learns about Ross's feelings for her, and discovers she feels the same in return. Although few Friends writers expected the couple's relationship to become a widespread phenomenon, they agreed it was time to change their dynamic to prevent the "he's pining, she's oblivious" pattern from growing repetitive. They drew inspiration from the works of author Jane Austen to shift the pining from Ross to Rachel, and constantly reworked the episode more than any other due to its high stakes. Crane admitted that keeping viewers invested in their relationship for ten years was challenging.

After Rachel and Ross drunkenly marry in Las Vegas during season five, Schwimmer initially objected to the idea of Ross divorcing Rachel, feeling it pushed the character too far after already having been divorced twice, only to later claim to still be in love with Rachel. Rachel and Joey’s romantic storyline was conceived because the writers wanted to further postpone Ross and Rachel’s reunion. Despite protests from the cast, who felt it would render Rachel, Joey, and Ross unlikeable for betraying one another in different ways, Crane felt that pairing Rachel and Joey during season ten was essential because of how inappropriate it was. The cast was relieved when the Rachel-Joey relationship ended. The writers were also uncertain about Rachel’s pregnancy storyline, concerned about how to incorporate the baby without allowing Friends to “become a show about a baby” while also not ignoring the child’s existence. In 2019, Crane admitted that Emma did not receive enough attention from Rachel during her formative years. When it came time to write the series finale, Crane and Kauffman said the only element they had decided from early on was that Ross and Rachel would end up together, feeling there was no benefit in continuing to frustrate the audience. At one point, the writers considered ending their relationship in more of a “gray area”, only hinting that they would eventually end up together in the future.

=== Casting ===
Rachel was the most difficult Friends character to cast. The studio had offered the role to their first choice, Téa Leoni, but she turned it down to star on the sitcom The Naked Truth. Tiffani Thiessen was a top contender but ultimately deemed too young compared to the rest of the cast. Jane Sibbett was considered after a strong audition but eliminated when she disclosed her pregnancy, and ultimately cast as Ross’s ex-wife Carol. (Note: Carol was originally portrayed by Anita Barone, who left the series after one episode to pursue a full-time role and was subsequently replaced by Jane Sibbett.) Lisa Whelchel saw the pilot script's potential but opted not to pursue the role because she was uncomfortable with the show’s sexual themes. An NBC executive had offered it to Jami Gertz, but Crane did not consider her right for the part and was ultimately relieved when she passed. Other actresses who auditioned include Elizabeth Berkley, Denise Richards, Melissa Rivers, Nicollette Sheridan, Parker Posey, and Jane Krakowski.

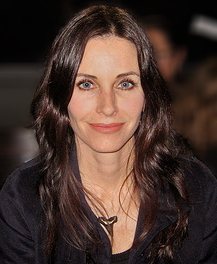
Courteney Cox (pictured in 2009) was initially offered the role of Rachel but preferred to play Monica.

Friends was Aniston's sixth sitcom; each of her previous shows had been canceled early. She had also appeared in several unsuccessful projects for NBC. Feeling uncertain about her acting career, Aniston confided in Littlefield, who encouraged her to audition for Friends. She auditioned shortly after declining a cast member position on the sketch comedy show Saturday Night Live. The producers had originally wanted Cox to play Rachel. However, Cox campaigned for the role of Monica instead, feeling she had more in common with that character. Meanwhile, although unbeknownst to each other, Aniston was being considered for Monica, but convinced the producers that she was better suited for Rachel's personality. At one point, Cox had begun to regret her decision to play Monica, until her own character’s storylines improved. Kudrow had also expressed interest in playing Rachel during auditions, believing she could channel the character’s materialism, but the producers preferred her for Phoebe.

Crane and Kauffman had worked with Aniston prior and preferred her for the role, but she had already been cast in the developing CBS sitcom Muddling Through. Because Aniston was technically unavailable, the producers auditioned several other actresses, but ultimately cast her in second position because they found none as suitable for Rachel. According to Aniston, she received the offer within an hour of returning home after auditioning. Since CBS was hesitant to release Aniston from contract, NBC was concerned about the cost of having to potentially recast Rachel and reshoot episodes should Muddling Through be picked up. Littlefield was confident that Friends would succeed over Muddling Through, but acknowledged that he risked millions of dollars "Every time we shot another episode with Jennifer". Friends's producers hoped that Muddling Through would be canceled before Friends premiered. According to casting director Ellie Kanner, despite Muddling Through's uncertain future, CBS ordered additional episodes of their sitcom in an effort to retain Aniston as Friends began gaining traction. Aniston preferred Friends to the point where she pleaded with Les Moonves, then-president of Warner Bros. Television, to help release her from her Muddling Through contract. Meanwhile, a Muddling Through producer warned Aniston that Friends was the weaker series and would not make her a star. As a precaution, NBC limited how many Friends promotions and photoshoots Aniston participated in, and continued auditioning other candidates. Some of Aniston’s friends told her they were auditioning for her role on Friends and asked her for advice. To further ensure Aniston’s availability, Littlefield instructed NBC’s scheduling strategist Preston Beckman to compete for Muddling Through’s viewership by scheduling adaptations of Danielle Steel novels in the same time slot. Ultimately, Muddling Through was canceled after three months and 10 episodes, two weeks before Friends premiered, allowing Aniston to remain on the sitcom. By this point, Aniston had already filmed at least three episodes for Friends. Crane appreciated Aniston’s interpretation of Rachel, noting that “in the wrong hands Rachel is kind of annoying and spoiled and unlikable”. Once Aniston was officially cast, her character's personality was tailored to suit her own. Aniston said that more of her own personality was incorporated into Rachel as both she and the character matured over the course of the series. Although she was not raised wealthy, Aniston said she was familiar with the "Rachel type" from growing up in Manhattan and observing girls from the Upper East Side, and shared her love of clothing.

The creators and producers treated Friends as an ensemble comedy, with each main character maintaining roughly equal importance within the series. In the title sequence, Aniston is credited first due to the cast being listed alphabetically by surname. Aniston and her co-stars were paid $22,500 per episode during the first season of the series. Around season two, the cast realized that Aniston and Schwimmer were earning more than the rest of the ensemble due to the show's emphasis on the Ross–Rachel storyline. Schwimmer and Aniston volunteered to take pay cuts in exchange for the cast renegotiating equal salaries. The Friends cast was among the first in television history to negotiate collectively for equal salaries. After they settled (Note: The cast had originally demanded $100,000 per episode before returning to film season three.) for $75,000 per episode in season three, Aniston was paid $85,000 per episode in season four, $100,000 per episode in season five, $125,000 per episode in season six, and $750,000 per episode in seasons seven and eight. By seasons nine and ten, Aniston and the main cast were earning $1 million per episode, approximately $25 million per year. Alongside Cox and Kudrow, Aniston's $1 million salary made her the highest-paid television actress of all-time, which was recognized by The Guinness Book of World Records in 2002. She continues to earn approximately $20 million per year in residuals, decades after the series ended. She and the cast were paid $2.5 million each for the 2021 reunion special, after initially declining $1 million offers.

Aniston eventually surpassed Cox as the show's most famous cast member. At times the producers would use the actress' popularity to boost the show's ratings, notably her character's seventh-season kiss with actress Winona Ryder and pregnancy arc. Her then-husband, actor Brad Pitt, also guest-starred in an episode of the series as an old schoolmate, marking their only on-screen appearance together. Aniston recalled the cast and creators being highly supportive of her efforts to pursue acting opportunities outside of Friends and accommodating her hectic schedule while filming the series. Although she did not want the show to end, Aniston admitted she would rather it conclude while still successful, questioning how much longer she could convincingly continue playing Rachel. At one point, she had contemplated not returning for season 10, later explaining, “I had a couple issues that I was dealing with". She had expressed a desire to leave the show to prioritize other projects. The final season was reduced from 24 to 18 episodes; while some reports claimed the decision was made to accommodate Aniston’s film schedule and aspirations to start a family, her representatives denied this.

== Characterization and themes ==
Rachel is the youngest main character on Friends. The term "spoiled" is often used to describe her early appearances. According to Crane and Kauffman's original character description, Rachel is a spoiled yet courageous young woman who "has worked for none of what she has" and, as such, is initially "equipped to do nothing". Throughout the series, she is known for her beauty, wealthy upbringing, popularity, and strong sense of style. Frequently characterized as the girl next door, Anne Bilson of The Telegraph described Rachel as "funny but not too funny, pretty but not too pretty, sexy but not too sexy, scatterbrained but not too scatterbrained". Meanwhile, Liat Kornowski, writing for The Huffington Post, said Rachel is a "beautiful, coveted, slightly neurotic, borderline egocentric" character.

Rachel undergoes one of the most significant character transformations on the series, evolving from “a dependent, uninspired, directionless 20-something on her way down the aisle toward a man she didn't love” into “a confident, self-sufficient working mother who went after what she wanted and almost always got it”, according to Entertainment Weekly's Maddie Boardman. Observing that each main character is based on a stereotype, Jonathan Bernstein of The Daily Telegraph identified Rachel as "the self-absorbed one who goes from riches to rags", with her materialism often serving as the punchline of jokes involving her. Originally depicted as being unprepared for "the world as an adult", author Madeline Dimaggio wrote that although "Rachel grew within the context of the series ... she would always struggle with the spoiled, image-conscious Daddy's girl" reputation. TV Land wrote that, despite her privileged upbringing, Rachel proves herself to be smart, resourceful, and chic, qualities that benefit both her professional and personal lives. Episodes featuring Rachel’s sisters, Jill and Amy, serve as reminders of who Rachel used to be and how far she had evolved since leaving Long Island. Splitsider’s Mike D'Avria determined that Rachel has the highest percentage of serious monogamous relationships among the main characters.

Rachel is considered to be the most fashionable of the sextet, and wore the trendiest clothes of the three female leads. According to BuddyTV, although Rachel becomes less self-absorbed in later seasons, "she [remains] the most image-centric" character. As such, Rachel’s style and wardrobe are considered defining characteristics of the character, consisting of casual staples such as denim, simple T-shirts and tank tops, white sneakers, overalls, plaid skirts, cargo pants, blazers, pantsuits, sweatshirts, and sweatpants. After Rachel begins working at Bloomingdale's, her wardrobe becomes more elevated while remaining minimal, incorporating tank tops layered over T-shirts, high-waisted jeans and skirts, block heels, overalls, coordinated suit sets, and short dresses with square necklines. Costume designer Debra McGuire used Rachel’s wardrobe to both distinguish her from the other female characters and reflect her personal growth, describing her as “a princess from Long Island” who evolves into a sophisticated employee at Ralph Lauren. As part of Kauffman’s vision of seeing everyone in jeans, McGuire dressed Rachel in a significant amount of denim because it was fashionable at the time, although she later admitted she was never particularly enthusiastic about that decision. She generally adhered to a distinct color palettes for each main character. She initially used predominantly blues and greens for Rachel, which evolved into a more neutral color palette as the series progressed. McGuire said Rachel’s style evolution mirrors her personal growth, from someone who took her belongings for granted to a character who learns to value what she owns after having to earn her own money.

Critics and fans long debated and speculated about Rachel's Jewish heritage, which was not explicitly confirmed until 2011. Vulture's Lindsey Weber, who identifies as Jewish, observed several similarities and Jewish stereotypes she shares with the character, citing her Long Island origin and engagement to a Jewish doctor as allusions to the character's Jewish culture. In her book Changed for Good: A Feminist History of the Broadway Musical, author Stacy Wolf identified Rachel as one of several popular female television characters who embodied Jewish stereotypes during the 1990s and often served as "the butt of the shows' jokes". Meanwhile, JDate's Rebecca Frankel cited Rachel as one of the earliest and most prominent examples of the Jewish American Princess stereotype on screen. Writing for the University of North Carolina at Chapel Hill, Alicia R. Korenman also acknowledged Rachel's initial Jewish American Princess qualities, describing her as "spoiled, dependent on her father's money and her fiance's, is horrified at the thought of working for a living and generally inept in her attempts to do so, and is eventually revealed to have had a nose job", which she eventually overcomes as they become less "evident in later seasons of the show". In his article "Princesses, Schlemiels, Punishers and Overbearing Mothers", Evan Cooper described Rachel as a "de-semitized" Jew because, aside from her name, "there is never any discussion of experiences of growing up in a Jewish culture, no use of Yiddish, and few, if any, references to family members with distinctively Jewish surnames". Cooper continued to write that although Rachel possesses some Jewish American Princess traits, she is more similar to the "little woman" stereotype. The New York Post's Robert Rorke labeled Rachel "a rehabilitated Jewish American Princess", in contrast to her sister Amy (Christina Applegate) who remains "selfish, condescending and narcissistic".

== Critical reception ==
Reception towards Rachel has been mostly positive, with the character being praised for her wit, charm, and personal style. John Reid of The A.V. Club attributed the pilot's success to Rachel, describing her as "the perfect stranger" to progress the show's plot and character growth in the other main characters "because unlike the rest of them, Rachel is interested in finding meaning for her life". Writing for the same website, Sonia Saraiya called Rachel "a model for women coming of age in the 1990s—the popular, pretty girl dissatisfied with where those illusions have taken her but also unwilling to embrace the more aggressively 'feminist' career-woman strategy". Adrienne Tyler of Screen Rant said that, despite being the character most in need of a reality check, Rachel “most clearly demonstrates" the show's themes about adulthood, and Joe Reid of Decider called her the show's "the most interesting character from the first episode on". Blaise Santi of TVLine considered Rachel’s entrance in the pilot episode to be one of the 15 greatest character introductions in television history. The New York Times's Joseph Hanania found Rachel's telephone conversation with her father during the pilot "hilarious". While People called her "spoiled-but-lovable", TV Guide described Rachel as "neurotic and adorable". Nick Venable of CinemaBlend said Rachel's "faux grace combined with emotional distance ... made the character such a loveable bitch". Writing for Heat, Ellen Kerry hailed Rachel's gradual transformation from waitress to businesswoman as arguably "the best thing on tv". USA Today's Robert Bianco credits Rachel's pregnancy storyline with saving Friends, observing that the arc increased the show's ratings while ultimately reversing the show's decline, believing "Friends probably would have ended sooner" without it. BDCwire ranked "The One with the Ball", "The One with Rachel's Inadvertent Kiss", "The One With The Football", "The One with the Fake Party" and "The One In Vegas, Part One" Rachel's five strongest episodes.

Some aspects of the character's storylines, decisions, and personality have been criticized. Neeraj Chand of Looper and Tilly Pearce of Metro agreed that while Rachel was often likable and improved over time, she retained streaks of selfishness and entitlement that were never fully resolved. Rachel Handler of Vulture called her "deeply incompetent at almost everything". TVLine panned Rachel for sleeping with her engaged ex-fiancé, Barry, in "The One With the Evil Orthodontist". Collider’s Jennie Richardson named “The One with Rachel’s Assistant” the worst episode of the series, citing Rachel’s relationship with her assistant, Tag, and the lack of consequences as outdated and inappropriate. Blythe Chadim of Collider and Adrienne Tyler of Screen Rant felt the finale undermined Rachel’s character development by having her choose to stay with Ross instead of accepting a job offer in Paris, while Hunter Ingram of TV Insider said fans remain uncertain that Rachel made the right decision. Symphony Barnes of Paste felt that, despite being one the most developed characters on the show, Rachel is ultimately reduced to “a pawn in romantic drama” by the finale, and Stylist's Clare Considine felt that any potential for Rachel to be considered a feminist icon is complicated by her decision to stay with Ross at the end of the series. S.K. Sapiano of Collider said that, compared to Phoebe and Monica, Rachel’s comedic potential is often overlooked. At times, the character was involved in mild controversy, such as “The One Where Dr. Ramoray Dies” when Rachel and Monica play rock paper scissors to decide who wins the last condom in their apartment. “The One with the Rumor”, in which Rachel learns that a former schoolmate had spread a rumor about her being a hermaphrodite, was criticized as offensive to members of the intersex community, and has retrospectively been called one of the show's weaker episodes by some publications. Additionally, fans would often approach Aniston and scold her for decisions that Rachel makes within the show that they do not particularly agree with. Her Jewish identity was also criticized by some. Arielle Kaplan of St. Louis Jewish Light wrote that the character “encompassed all the negative JAP stereotypes”. Shoshana Gottlieb of Hey Alma argued that, although Rachel “embodies several problematic Jewish tropes”, the writers, intentionally or otherwise, “absolve themselves of negatively stereotyping Jewish people” by not explicitly identifying her as Jewish in the series. She argued that this framing allows Rachel’s selfishness and vapidness to be treated as character flaws she must overcome rather than traits associated with Jewish stereotypes. Kelsey Miller of Vox argued that Rachel’s ambiguous Jewish identity reflected the show’s reluctance to assume that general audiences would accept a Jewish leading lady, which she viewed as part of the series’ broader aversion to adversity.

The character was immensely popular among female viewers during the early years of Friends, and remained a fan favorite throughout all ten seasons. Vanessa Golembewski of Refinery29 said that, despite her flaws, Rachel remained the character most female viewers identified with because she appeared to be “the most seemingly normal one of the group”. According to Dominic Wills of TalkTalk, Rachel established herself as "the general favourite" and few critics "had a bad word to say about Jennifer Aniston". Aniston's performance was consistently praised, which Kevin Fallon of The Daily Beast said reflected "the work of a brilliant character actress". In Entertainment Weekly, Ken Tucker said the actress brings "prickly intelligence to her role". TV Guide said she "instantly charmed audiences with her perfect looks and endearingly flawed persona". The Guardian's Ryan Gilbey singled out Aniston as the cast member "least reliant on goofball caricature", arguing that portraying the show's most relatable character also meant that she “got the lion’s share of attention”. Her comedic abilities received particular praise from critics, with Amanda Mitchell of Marie Claire writing that Aniston delivered some of her career-best work during Rachel's pregnancy. Journalist Bim Adewunmi attributed the believability of Rachel’s transformation to Aniston’s "skill as a performer", relatability, and comedic timing. Naming Rachel one of her best on-screen performances, Brandon Miller of Looper said Aniston excelled in both the comedic and dramatic aspects of the role. Conversely, Isha Mayer of Elle India felt the role hardly showcased Aniston’s talents, believing she only demonstrated her versatility and range in projects following Friends. For her performance, Aniston received five Primetime Emmy Awards nominations, two Golden Globe Awards nominations, and two Screen Actors Guild Awards nominations. At the Emmys, she was twice nominated in the supporting comedy actress category (2000 and 2001) before moving to the lead comedy actress category, in which she was nominated from 2002 to 2004. (Note: During the show's first seven seasons, the cast submitted themselves in supporting acting categories to maintain the perception of Friends as an ensemble series. They began submitting themselves in lead categories in 2002, the same year Aniston won her first Emmy Award.) In 2002, she won the Emmy Award for Outstanding Lead Actress in a Comedy Series for the episode "The One Where Rachel Has a Baby", becoming its only cast member to win an acting Emmy in the lead category for the show. In 2003, she won the Golden Globe Award for Best Performance by an Actress In A Television Series – Comedy Or Musical. In 2021, she was nominated for a Primetime Emmy Award for Outstanding Variety Special (Pre-Recorded) as an executive producer of Friends: The Reunion, alongside her five original castmates.

Entertainment.ie named Rachel the best character on the show, and The Independent ranked her third. Christopher Rosa of Glamour ranked Rachel the fourth-best Friend despite naming her his personal favorite, citing her self-absorption and scheming as reasons. Linda Holmes of NPR ranked her fifth, despite having grown to appreciate her humor more as the series progressed.

=== Relationships ===
Rachel’s romantic relationships were the focus of several storylines, the most prominent of which was her on-again, off-again relationship with Ross. Viewers began rooting for Rachel and Ross's coupling from the beginning of the series, and openly voiced their frustration with Rachel's obliviousness to Ross's feelings. The couple's first kiss at the end of season two's "The One Where Ross Finds Out" was met with deafening applause from the studio audience. Arguably the show's most famous storyline, the relationship proved wildly popular among audiences, with China Daily and Gary Susman of Rolling Stone celebrating the pair’s long-awaited reunion in the series finale. However, some critics found the relationship drawn out, tedious, and occasionally unfunny. Ross and Rachel’s season-three breakup spawned a long-running debate among fans over whether Ross had cheated on Rachel, or whether the two were technically broken up. They are often ranked among television's most beloved couples. TV Guide called them arguably "the most iconic TV couple in recent memory", and Greg Cwik of Slant Magazine said they comprise "one of the most confoundingly beloved relationships in television history". Tenplay believes they defined the term "will they, won't they" couple.

During season ten, Rachel's brief romance with Joey drew strong criticism from both critics and fans. It is widely regarded as one of the show's worst storylines, although it did not harm viewership. Joshua Kurp of Splitsider believes that the Rachel/Joey/Ross love triangle is the main reason the show's final two seasons continued to perform well despite mediocre reviews. Entertainment Tonight Canada ranked "The One After Rachel and Joey Kiss" among the show's ten worst episodes. In more recent years, some fans have defended the relationship, arguing that Joey would have been better suited for Rachel and that the show ultimately didn’t allow their relationship to fully develop.

== Cultural impact ==
Rachel's popularity established her as one of the show's breakout characters, and she received the most public attention of its main characters. Author David Wild described her as one of the most popular characters in television history. Alice Cary of British Vogue theorized that even people who have never watched Friends are likely familiar with Rachel to some extent, while The New Indian Express credited her one-liners and hairstyles with helping make her a pop culture phenomenon. Described by Penny Goldstone of Marie Claire as one of their all-time favorite television characters, The Times of India considers Rachel to be one of the general public’s favourite television characters of the 1990s, and Amory Rose of Business Insider called her "one of the most iconic characters of the 1990s and early 2000s". Elle Australia's Mahalia Chang said the character offered "our first glimpse into early nouveau pop culture feminism". Several baby name books and websites associate the name “Rachel” with the character. Lior Zaltzman of Kveller believes Rachel Green might be the most famous fictional Rachel.

In 2015, Us Weekly named Rachel the most beloved television character of the previous two decades. Entertainment Weekly ranked her sixth on a similar 2010 countdown, and also included her among the 25 greatest television characters from 1990 to 2015. AOL TV ranked Rachel as the 23rd-greatest female television character. Digital Spy ranked her the ninth-greatest female television character of the 21st century, attributing her legacy to Aniston’s performance and writing that her story arc has aged better than some aspects of the series. BuddyTV ranked Rachel the 15th funniest female character in sitcom history, while ChaCha placed Rachel, Monica, and Phoebe 11th, 12th, and 13th on its list of the "Top 16 Female TV Characters of All Time". In 2019, Harper's Bazaar named Rachel one of the most impactful female television characters, with author Olivia Blair writing that she helped "promote ideals of female independence". According to an industry poll conducted by The Hollywood Reporter, Rachel was voted the 29th-best female character in 2016.

Aniston became the show's breakout star, and received more media attention than her castmates. While starring on Friends, the media nicknamed her “America’s Sweetheart”. Turner Classic Movies described her as "One of the most popular television actresses of her era", and The Indian Express reported that she arguably became "the most well-known actor among the main Friends cast members". The sitcom was instrumental in launching Aniston's film career. She was among the first cast members to achieve significant success outside the series, and has been described by multiple media outlets as the show's most commercially successful cast member following its conclusion. Steve Charnock of Yahoo! Movies dubbed her the show's only bona fide movie star. While agreeing that Aniston’s film career has been successful, several critics have argued that she is often typecast in Rachel-like roles, particularly in romantic comedies. Aniston has made some deliberate acting choices to distance her image from Rachel. Despite her success in film, Stephen Puddicombe of The Guardian wrote that “none of her big-screen roles have created anything like the same beloved legacy as Rachel Green”. Josh Robertson of Complex named Aniston one of the most attractive sitcom stars of the 1990s, while Maxim ranked her the second-most attractive television actress of the decade. Virgin Media ranked Rachel among television's sexiest roles. Aniston joined Instagram in 2019, debuting with a selfie featuring her Friends co-stars. The surge in followers temporarily disrupted the platform and prevented some users from following her account. She subsequently set a Guinness World Record for the fastest time to reach one million followers, achieving the milestone in 5 hours and 16 minutes.

In 2016, Vanessa Bayer performed an impression of Rachel on Saturday Night Live during the show's Weekend Update segment. She had previously debuted the impression on Jimmy Kimmel Live!. Aniston later appeared as herself during the same segment alongside Bayer, jokingly critiquing Bayer’s impression and offering her own impersonation of Rachel. Although she was initially apprehensive about the impression, Aniston later described Bayer's portrayal as one of the best impressions of her. Some online journalists have attempted to recreate Rachel’s botched Thanksgiving trifle. In 2021, Kauffman debunked an online theory suggesting that the entire series took place in a dream Rachel had before her wedding to Barry.

=== Fashion ===
Rachel is widely regarded as a style icon, whose costumes are considered to have been highly influential on fashion during the 1990s and beyond. Angela Melero, an editorial director for The Zoe Report, called Rachel a pop culture icon and argued that she is among the most legendary style icons of the 1990s. Vogue India's Praachi Raniwala described the character as "the decade’s most defining celluloid style icon". Mahogany Clayton of StyleBlazer believes she dominated nearly every fashion trend from the time period. Rhys McKay of New Idea compared Rachel to modern-day social media influencers, while writers for Body+Soul and Vogue Adria likened her impact to those of Meghan Markle and Carolyn Bessette Kennedy, respectively. Described as having the most influential and curated wardrobe on Friends, Kirsty Thatcher of Russh considers her clothes to be the show's most enduring legacy, calling Rachel "an original proponent of the chic working girl wardrobe". Several outlets have referred to Rachel as an “it girl”, citing her aspirational fashion sense. Publications such as Elle, Glamour, Harper's Bazaar, The Independent, Numéro, and Redbook have ranked Rachel among television's best-dressed characters, with writers for Business Insider calling her "perhaps the most fashionable character to have graced our television screens". StyleCaster ranked Rachel the 28th most stylish television character of all time, out of 50. According to Phoebe Avison of Bustle, her style "helped define the way an entire generation of women dress today". Brides magazine ranked Rachel's wedding dress among "The Best TV Wedding Dresses".

Rachel’s fashion choices resonated with contemporary viewers at the time of the series’ original broadcast, delivering some of the show's most memorable outsits. She became known for her fashion-forward 1990s wardrobe. Of the main characters, McGuire received the most questions about Rachel’s outfits while Friends was on the air. Professional stylists polled by Business Insider named Rachel the most stylish Friends character, attributing her appeal to the simplicity and timelessness of her wardrobe. Fashion journalists have written about how the character’s outfit choices have remained relevant decades after the series ended, particularly among millennial and Generation Z viewers, who often use them as inspiration. Samantha Sutton of InStyle attributed this to a 2025 resurgence of Y2K style, while Sophie Austen of The Courier credited the character's use of timeless pieces, which are easy to recreate. Writers for W felt that Rachel’s fashion has stood the test of time, unlike some other aspects of the show. In 2018, luxury fashion brand By Far released a handbag inspired by the character. In 2019, Ralph Lauren released a collection inspired by Rachel's office wardrobe on the series. That same year, McGuire said she still received several emails a week about Rachel’s outfits, which she attributed to younger viewers discovering the show and the cyclical nature of fashion. A yellow embroidered dress with a mid-thigh slit worn by Aniston in the season-five episode “The One With All the Kissing” received the most enthusiastic response and inquiries of any outfit featured on the series. McGuire continued to work with Aniston throughout her career, notably costuming her for her return to television on The Morning Show beginning in 2019. According to a 2021 study by Money.co.uk, which analysed Google search data over the preceding year, Rachel’s wardrobe was ranked as the most influential on television, with nearly 450,000 annual searches. She was also voted television’s most fashionable character in a poll conducted by Flawless.org. Layla Ilchi of Women’s Wear Daily dubbed the phenomenon a “Rachel Green Style Resurgence”, writing that “few TV characters have captured — and sustained — fashion influence quite like Rachel".

Fans frequently noted that Aniston's nipples were occasionally visible through her wardrobe. Although Aniston stated that she wore a bra while filming the show, commentators and fans have retroactively labeled the character an early pioneer of the "Free the Nipple" movement.

==== Hair ====
Aniston’s haircut from the first two seasons of Friends sparked a global trend. The cut was created by Aniston's hair stylist, Chris McMillan. Its popularity coincided with the show’s pinnacle viewership during the mid-to-late 1990s, and was eventually nicknamed "The Rachel" after the character. "The Rachel" immediately became popular among women, who inundated hair salons with requests for the style. Hair stylists have attributed its popularity to its medium length, volume and layers, as well as its ability to frame the face in a flattering manner. One of the most sought-after hairstyles of the 1990s, Paste named it the decade's defining hairdo, and Morwenna Ferrier of The Guardian called it "as synonymous with the 1990s as grunge". An estimated 11 million women have worn the hairstyle, making it one of the most requested hairstyles of all time. Entertainment Weekly called it the most desired haircut of the Clinton era, and included it among 25 fashion moments that changed the entertainment industry.

Jennifer Aniston portraying her character while donning the famous "Rachel" haircut during the second-season episode "The One with Phoebe's Husband". The hairstyle would go on to become one of the most popular of all time.

“The Rachel” has been described as one of the most famous hairstyles in popular culture history, and was voted the most influential haircut of all time in a 2004 poll conducted by Morphy Richards. Several publications have ranked it among the most iconic hairstyles of all time, including Time. According to The Huffington Post, the hairstyle is one of "The Most Famous TV Hairstyles Of All Time", and Ripley's Believe It or Not! named it "perhaps, the most iconic hairdo that television has ever seen". Glamour featured the cut in its "Hair Hall of Fame". The magazine also cited it among “The very best hair to have graced the small screen”, and ranked it among the 20 most memorable television hairstyles. The Sydney Morning Herald ranked it the second greatest television hairstyle, while Metro ranked the "Rachel" the character's second-best hairstyle.

Fashion and pop culture journalists have discussed the hairstyle’s impact on Friends’s cultural relevance, with Carolyn Steber of Bustle writing that "you didn’t even have to be a Friends fan to know what [The Rachel] was". According to Joanna Robinson of Vanity Fair, its popularity truly cemented the sitcom’s influence on fashion, and Sarah Carrillo of Total Beauty argued that it "helped make Friends the phenomenon it was". Opining that Friends spawned few memorable catchphrases in comparison to its contemporaries, Tom Jicha of The Baltimore Sun attributed much of the show's legacy to the hairstyle, calling it the show's “only cultural trend” in 2004. Hannah Lyons Powell of Glamour said the hairstyle established Aniston as "the definitive hair icon of the '90s and the proud owner of arguably the most infamous and influential hairstyle of all time". Similarly, Jenna Rosenstein of Harper’s Bazaar, who included “The Rachel” among “The 50 Most Iconic Beauty Looks of All Time”, said it “brought layers into the ’90s, cemented Jennifer Aniston as a living hair icon, and turned hairstylist Chris McMillan into a modern beauty master”. McMillan maintains that he did not intentionally create the haircut for Aniston, noting that versions of it had been worn by other celebrities before. However, he believes it became most closely associated with her because millions of people saw her on television every week and became obsessed with both her and Friends.

In the second-season episode “The One with the Lesbian Wedding”, Rachel references the popularity of her haircut while complaining that her overbearing mother is attempting to reinvent her life after hers, quipping, “Couldn’t she have just copied my haircut?”. Despite her association with the cut, Aniston has stated that she disliked the hairstyle despite its popularity. She found maintaining the hairstyle without McMillan's help difficult, and stated that she would rather shave her head than have to wear it for the rest of her life. Since Aniston, several other celebrities have worn variations of the "Rachel". The hairstyle has experienced several revivals and reinventions in popularity in the 2020s, following the series’ conclusion.

== See also ==
- List of Friends and Joey characters
