= BuildDirect =

Canadian online marketplace company

- Founded: 15 July 1999
- Headquarters: Vancouver, British Columbia, Canada
- Key people: Dan Park CEO
- Products: Home Improvement E-Tailer
- Website: www.builddirect.com

BuildDirect is a technology company headquartered in Vancouver, British Columbia. It is an online marketplace for heavyweight home improvement products. The company was founded in 1999 by Jeff Booth and Rob Banks, and connects buyers (consumers and contractors) with sellers (suppliers and manufacturers). Categories include, but are not limited to, flooring, tile, decking, building materials, outdoor, kitchen & bath, molding & accessories and doors.

== History ==
Prior to co-founding BuildDirect, Jeff Booth was a home builder. After experiencing "complexities and inefficiencies", Booth founded BuildDirect in October 1999 with friend Rob Banks. Their goal was to simplify the home improvement industry. The first years focused on shipping heavyweight home improvement materials. In 2002 they launched www.Builddirect.com, an e-commerce site for home improvement products and building materials. The company grew quickly, doubling in size from 2002 to 2004.

During the 2008 financial crisis, the company nearly went out of business but survived by changing its business model to include suppliers lending their product on consignment to BuildDirect warehouses. In 2010, the company built a supply chain for shipping heavy goods "anywhere to anywhere", and in 2016, they launched the BuildDirect Home Marketplace. The company initially sold home building materials but has since diversified to include other products such as furniture, home decor, lighting, and outdoor living items.

On June 10, 2015, Builddirect acquired DraftingSpace, a software company based in Waterloo.

== Heavyweight Supply Chain ==
The average weight of a BuildDirect product order is 1,500 pounds. To ship these heavy materials, BuildDirect built a new system. The company utilizes an existing network of primary transporters including freight, rail, and truck to import products to North America, move them to warehouses, and deliver them to customers. BuildDirect also uses technology and a competitive bidding process to calculate delivery methods.

=== Gateway Supply Chain ===
In February 2017, BuildDirect opened its global supply chain platform for heavyweight goods. The BuildDirect Gateway provides any third party access to BuildDirect's network of warehousing services, ground and ocean logistics for any part of the shipping process, from point of manufacture through last-mile delivery.

== Business ==
BuildDirect has built its own proprietary analytics and forecasting tools; BuildDirect Demand Rank, BuildDirect Product Rank, and BuildDirect Inventory Rank. These tools are used to analyze product specific data relating to consumer interest, market competitiveness, and geographic performance. This demand data is also available to suppliers, which provides opportunities for them to manage their own inventory planning, production and shipping.

In February 2016, BuildDirect launched the BuildDirect Home Marketplace; an online platform that connects consumers with home improvement products. The platform also offers a self-service model for sellers to onboard their products.

== Locations ==
BuildDirect has many distribution points across North America, with 6 super warehouses in Vancouver B.C., Los Angeles, Dallas, Atlanta, Chicago, and New Jersey. The company headquarters is located in Vancouver, B.C.

== Awards ==
- 2006 - British Columbia Export Awards: Named as one of the top 24 exporters in B.C. and the top exporter in the Professional and Services category.
- 2012 - Nominated for a JDR award - which honors the best blogs in the design and remodeling industry - for their "green" blog.
- 2014 - Aon Hewitt's The 2014 Best Small & Medium Employers in Canada
- 2015 - Aon Hewitt's The 2015 Best Small & Medium Employers in Canada
- 2015 - BCTIA Technology Impact Awards - CEO Jeff Booth awarded "Person of the Year"
