= Gary Oldman filmography =

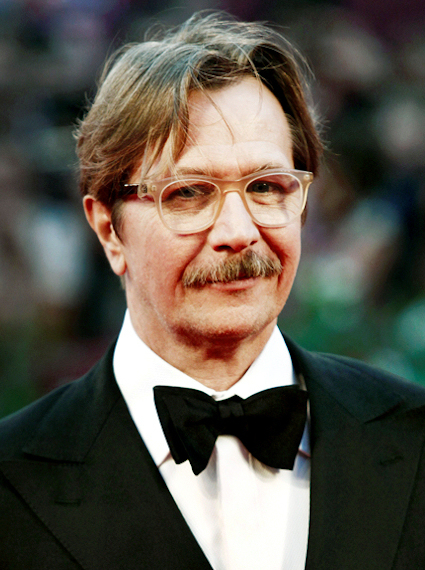
Oldman at the 2011 Venice International Film Festival

English actor and filmmaker Sir Gary Oldman made his film debut in the 1982 British ensemble drama Remembrance. He rose to prominence in British film with his portrayals of Sid Vicious in Sid and Nancy (1986), Joe Orton in Prick Up Your Ears (1987) and Rosencrantz in Rosencrantz & Guildenstern Are Dead (1990), while also gaining attention as the leader of a gang of football hooligans in the made-for-television drama film The Firm (1989). Regarded as a member of the "Brit Pack", he is also known for portraying a New York gangster in the American neo-noir crime film State of Grace (1990), Lee Harvey Oswald in JFK (1991) and Count Dracula in Bram Stoker's Dracula (1992).

Oldman is known for his portrayal of villains, like in the films True Romance with Christian Slater (1993), as Norman Stansfield in Léon: The Professional with Jean Reno (1994), The Fifth Element with Bruce Willis (1997), Air Force One with Harrison Ford (1997) and The Contender again with Christian Slater (2000). In 2004, he was cast as Sirius Black in Harry Potter and the Prisoner of Azkaban, the third film in the Harry Potter film series, reprising the role in Goblet of Fire, Order of the Phoenix and a cameo in Deathly Hallows – Part 2. He also played James Gordon in The Dark Knight Trilogy (2005–2012), George Smiley in Tinker Tailor Soldier Spy (2011) and Dreyfus in Dawn of the Planet of the Apes (2014).

Oldman's portrayal of Winston Churchill in the 2017 war drama film Darkest Hour earned him an Academy Award for Best Actor, a Golden Globe Award for Best Actor in a Motion Picture Drama, and a Screen Actors Guild Award for Outstanding Performance by a Male Actor in a Leading Role.

Oldman has executive produced films like The Contender, Plunkett & Macleane (1999) and Nil by Mouth (1997), the latter of which he also wrote and directed. He's been featured in television shows such as Fallen Angels (1993), Tracey Takes On... (1999) and Friends (2001). He has voiced the characters Ignitus and Viktor Reznov in the video games The Legend of Spyro and Call of Duty, respectively.

== Acting credits ==
=== Film ===
Year	Title	Role	Notes	Ref.
1982	Remembrance	Daniel		
1986	Sid and Nancy	Sid Vicious		
1987	Prick Up Your Ears	Joe Orton		
1988	Track 29	Martin		
1988	Criminal Law	Ben Chase		
1988	We Think the World of You	Johnny		
1989	Chattahoochee	Emmett Foley		
1990	Rosencrantz & Guildenstern Are Dead	Rosencrantz		
1990	State of Grace	Jackie Flannery		
1990	Henry & June	Pop	Credited as Maurice Escargot	
1991	JFK	Lee Harvey Oswald		
1992	Bram Stoker's Dracula	Count Dracula		
1993	True Romance	Drexl Spivey		
1993	Romeo Is Bleeding	Jack Grimaldi		
1994	Léon: The Professional	Norman Stansfield		
1994	Immortal Beloved	Ludwig van Beethoven		
1995	Murder in the First	Milton Glenn		
1995	The Scarlet Letter	Reverend Arthur Dimmesdale		
1996	Basquiat	Albert Milo		
1997	The Fifth Element	Jean-Baptiste Emanuel Zorg		
1997	Air Force One	Egor Korshunov		
1997	Nil by Mouth	—N/a	Director, writer, and producer only	
1998	Lost in Space	Dr. Zachary Smith		
1998	Quest for Camelot	Lord Ruber	Voice	
1999	Plunkett & Macleane	—N/a	Executive producer only	
2000	The Contender	Representative Sheldon Runyon	Also executive producer	
2001	Nobody's Baby	Buford Hill	Also producer	
2001	Hannibal	Mason Verger	Uncredited	
2002	Interstate 60	O.W. Grant		
2002	The Hire: Beat the Devil	The Devil	Short film	
2002	Tiptoes	Rolfe Bedalia		
2003	Sin	Charlie Kraken / Charlie Strom		
2004	Harry Potter and the Prisoner of Azkaban	Sirius Black		
2005	Batman Begins	James Gordon		
2005	Harry Potter and the Goblet of Fire	Sirius Black	Cameo appearance	
2006	The Backwoods	Paul		
2007	Harry Potter and the Order of the Phoenix	Sirius Black		
2008	Dead Fish	Lynch		
2008	The Dark Knight	James Gordon		
2009	The Unborn	Rabbi Joseph Sendak		
2009	Rain Fall	William Holtzer		
2009	A Christmas Carol	Tiny Tim / Bob Cratchit / Jacob Marley	Motion capture	
2009	Planet 51	General Grawl	Voice	
2010	The Book of Eli	Bill Carnegie		
2010	Countdown to Zero	Narrator	Documentary	
2010	One Night in Turin	Narrator	Documentary	
2011	Red Riding Hood	Father Solomon		
2011	Kung Fu Panda 2	Lord Shen	Voice	
2011	Harry Potter and the Deathly Hallows – Part 2	Sirius Black	Cameo	
2011	Tinker Tailor Soldier Spy	George Smiley		
2011	Guns, Girls and Gambling	Elvis Elvis		
2012	The Dark Knight Rises	James Gordon		
2012	Lawless	Floyd Banner		
2013	Paranoia	Nicolas Wyatt		
2014	RoboCop	Dr. Dennett Norton		
2014	Dawn of the Planet of the Apes	Dreyfus		
2015	Child 44	General Timur Nestorov		
2016	Man Down	Captain Peyton		
2016	Criminal	CIA Senior Agent Quaker Wells		
2017	The Space Between Us	Nathaniel Shepherd		
2017	The Hitman's Bodyguard	Vladislav Dukhovich		
2017	Darkest Hour	Winston Churchill		
2018	Tau	Tau	Voice	
2018	Hunter Killer	Admiral Charles Donnegan		
2019	Killers Anonymous	The Man		
2019	Mary	David		
2019	The Laundromat	Jürgen Mossack		
2019	The Courier	Ezekiel Mannings		
2020	Mank	Herman J. Mankiewicz		
2021	Crisis	Dr. Tyrone Brower		
2021	The Woman in the Window	Alistair Russell		
2023	Oppenheimer	Harry S. Truman	Cameo	
2024	Parthenope	John Cheever		

=== Television ===
Year	Title	Role	Notes	Ref.
1983	Meantime	Coxy	Television film	
1984	Dramarama	Ben	Episode: "On Your Tod"	
1984	Morgan's Boy	Colin	4 episodes	
1985	Summer Season	Gary	Episode: "Rachel and the Roarettes"	
1986	Honest, Decent and True	Derek Bates	Television film	
1989	Screen Two	Clive "Bex" Bissell	Episode: The Firm	
1989	Knots Landing	Don Ross	Episode: "Close Call"	
1991	Heading Home	Ian Tyson	Television film	
1992	Beyond 'JFK': The Question of Conspiracy	Himself	Television documentary film	
1993	Fallen Angels	Pat Keiley	Episode: "Dead End for Delia"	
1999	Tracey Takes On...	Hairdresser	Episode: "Hair"	
1999	Jesus	Pontius Pilate	Television film	
2001	Friends	Richard Crosby	Episode: "The One with Monica and Chandler's Wedding"	
2002	Greg the Bunny	Himself	Episode: "Piddler on the Roof"	
2022	Harry Potter 20th Anniversary: Return to Hogwarts	Himself	HBO Max special	
2022–present	Slow Horses	Jackson Lamb	Main role, also executive producer (since season 6)	

=== Theatre ===
Year	Title	Role	Playwright	Venue	Ref.
1979	Thark	Lionel Frush	Ben Travers	York Theatre Royal	
1982	Summit Conference	A Soldier	Robert David MacDonald	Lyric Theatre, London	
1984	Romeo and Juliet	Romeo Montague	William Shakespeare	Royal Shakespeare Company	
1985	Hamlet	Rosencrantz	William Shakespeare	Royal Shakespeare Company	
1987	Cabaret	The Emcee	Joe Masteroff / John Kander / Fred Ebb	Royal Shakespeare Company	
2025	Krapp's Last Tape	Krapp	Samuel Beckett	York Theatre Royal	
2026	Krapp's Last Tape	Krapp	Samuel Beckett	Royal Court Theatre	

== Video games ==
Year	Title	Voice role	Notes	Ref.
1993	Bram Stoker's Dracula	Count Dracula		
1998	The Fifth Element	Jean-Baptiste Emmanuel Zorg		
2003	Medal of Honor: Allied Assault - Spearhead	Sergeant Jack Barnes		
2003	True Crime: Streets of LA	Rasputin "Rocky" Kuznetskov / FBI Agent Paul Masterson		
2006	The Legend of Spyro: A New Beginning	Ignitus		
2007	The Legend of Spyro: The Eternal Night	Ignitus		
2008	The Legend of Spyro: Dawn of the Dragon	Ignitus		
2008	Call of Duty: World at War	Sergeant Viktor Reznov		
2010	Call of Duty: Black Ops	Viktor Reznov / Dr. Daniel Clarke		
2012	Call of Duty: Black Ops II	Viktor Reznov	Archive voice clips (uncredited)	
2015	Lego Dimensions	Lord Vortech		
2026	Squadron 42	Admiral Ernst Bishop	Also motion capture	

== See also ==
- List of awards and nominations received by Gary Oldman
