= List of awards and nominations received by Gary Oldman =

Gary Oldman awards and nominations
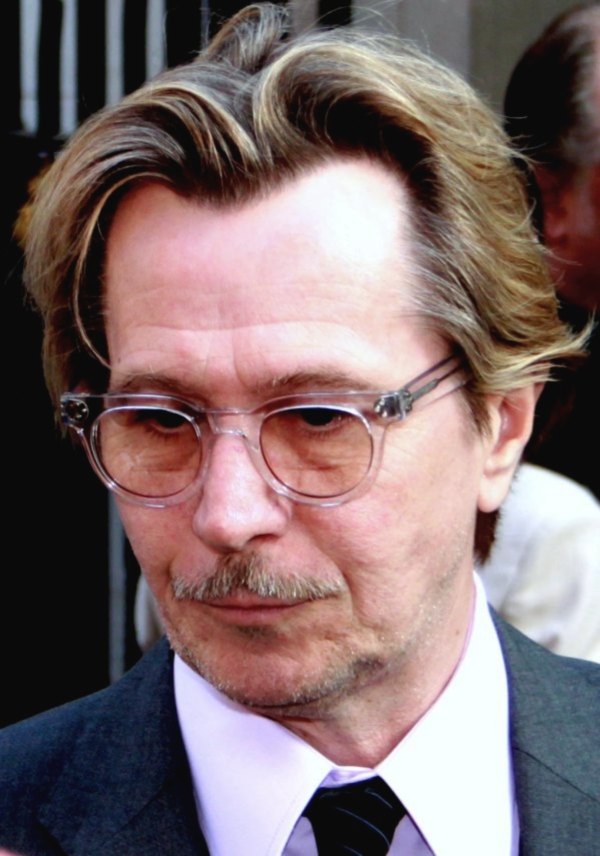
- Oldman at the 2011 Empire Awards
Awards and nominations
Award	Wins	Nominations
Academy Awards	1	3
Actor Awards	1	6
BAFTA Awards	3	7
Golden Globe Awards	1	5
Primetime Emmy Awards	0	3

Totals (Note: Certain award groups do not simply award one winner. They acknowledge several different recipients, have runners-up, and have third place. Since this is a specific recognition and is different from losing an award, runner-up mentions are considered wins in this award tally. For simplification and to avoid errors, each award in this list has been presumed to have had a prior nomination.)
- Wins: 47
- Nominations: 87

This is a list of awards and nominations received by Gary Oldman.

Gary Oldman is an English actor and filmmaker known for his roles in film and television. Over his career, Oldman has received numerous accolades including an Academy Award, three British Academy Film Awards, two Critics' Choice Movie Awards, a Golden Globe Award, and an Actor Award as well as nominations for three Primetime Emmy Awards, and two Independent Spirit Awards.

Oldman received the Academy Award for Best Actor for his portrayal of Winston Churchill in Joe Wright's historical drama Darkest Hour (2017). He was Oscar-nominated for portraying George Smiley in the Cold War spy thriller Tinker Tailor Soldier Spy (2011) and Herman J. Mankiewicz in David Fincher's drama Mank (2020). For his performance in Darkest Hour he also received the BAFTA Award for Best Actor in a Leading Role, the Golden Globe Award for Best Actor in a Motion Picture – Drama, and the Actor Award for Outstanding Actor in a Leading Role. For directing and writing the drama Nil by Mouth (1997), he won the BAFTA Awards for Outstanding British Film and Best Original Screenplay.

On television, he has portrayed Jackson Lamb, a sharp yet slovenly intelligence officer in the Apple TV+ spy thriller series Slow Horses (2022–present) for which he has earned nominations for the Primetime Emmy Award for Outstanding Lead Actor in a Drama Series, the British Academy Television Award for Best Actor, and the Golden Globe Award for Best Actor – Television Series Drama. For his guest role as a prestigious yet drunk actor in the NBC sitcom Friends (2001), he was nominated for the Primetime Emmy Award for Outstanding Guest Actor in a Comedy Series.

== Major associations ==
=== Academy Awards ===
Year	Category	Nominated work	Result	Ref.
2012	Best Actor	Tinker Tailor Soldier Spy	Nominated	
2018	Best Actor	Darkest Hour	Won	
2021	Best Actor	Mank	Nominated	

=== Actor Awards ===
Year	Category	Nominated work	Result	Ref.
2001	Outstanding Actor in a Supporting Role	The Contender	Nominated	
2018	Outstanding Actor in a Leading Role	Darkest Hour	Won	
2021	Outstanding Actor in a Leading Role	Mank	Nominated	
2025	Outstanding Actor in a Drama Series	Slow Horses	Nominated	
2025	Outstanding Ensemble in a Drama Series	Slow Horses	Nominated	
2026	Outstanding Actor in a Drama Series	Slow Horses	Nominated	

=== BAFTA Awards ===
Year	Category	Nominated work	Result	Ref.
British Academy Film Awards
1988	Best Actor in a Leading Role	Prick Up Your Ears	Nominated	
1998	Best British Film	Nil by Mouth	Won	
1998	Best Original Screenplay	Nil by Mouth	Won	
2012	Best Actor in a Leading Role	Tinker Tailor Soldier Spy	Nominated	
2018	Best Actor in a Leading Role	Darkest Hour	Won	
British Academy Television Awards
2023	Best Actor	Slow Horses	Nominated	
2025	Best Actor	Slow Horses	Nominated	

=== Critics' Choice Awards ===
Year	Category	Nominated work	Result	Ref.
Critics' Choice Movie Awards
2000	Alan J. Pakula Award	The Contender	Won	
2008	Best Acting Ensemble	The Dark Knight	Nominated	
2017	Best Actor	Darkest Hour	Won	
2020	Best Actor	Mank	Nominated	

=== Emmy Awards ===
Year	Category	Nominated work	Result	Ref.
Primetime Emmy Awards
2001	Outstanding Guest Actor in a Comedy Series	Friends (episode: "The One with Monica and Chandler's Wedding")	Nominated	
2024	Outstanding Lead Actor in a Drama Series	Slow Horses (episode: "Footprints")	Nominated	
2025	Outstanding Lead Actor in a Drama Series	Slow Horses (episode: "Identity Theft")	Nominated	
2026	Outstanding Lead Actor in a Drama Series	Slow Horses (episode: "Tall Tales")	Nominated	

=== Golden Globe Awards ===
Year	Category	Nominated work	Result	Ref.
2018	Best Actor in a Motion Picture – Drama	Darkest Hour	Won	
2021	Best Actor in a Motion Picture – Drama	Mank	Nominated	
2024	Best Actor in a Television Series – Drama	Slow Horses	Nominated	
2025	Best Actor in a Television Series – Drama	Slow Horses	Nominated	
2026	Best Actor in a Television Series – Drama	Slow Horses	Nominated	

== Other associations ==
Organizations	Year	Category	Work	Result	Ref.
Annie Awards	2012	Voice Acting in a Feature Production	Kung Fu Panda 2	Nominated	
AACTA Awards	2017	Best International Actor	Darkest Hour	Won	
AACTA Awards	2026	Best Actor in a Series	Slow Horses	Won	
British Independent Film Awards	1998	Best British Independent Film	Nil by Mouth	Nominated	
British Independent Film Awards	1998	Best Director	Nil by Mouth	Nominated	
British Independent Film Awards	1998	Best Original Screenplay	Nil by Mouth	Nominated	
British Independent Film Awards	2011	Best Actor	Tinker Tailor Soldier Spy	Nominated	
British Independent Film Awards	2017	Variety Award	—N/a	Won	
Empire Awards	1998	Best Newcomer	Nil by Mouth	Won	
Empire Awards	2011	Icon Award	—N/a	Won	
Empire Awards	2012	Best Actor	Tinker Tailor Soldier Spy	Won	
Empire Awards	2018	Best Actor	Darkest Hour	Nominated	
London Film Critics' Circle	1987	Actor of the Year	Prick Up Your Ears	Won	
London Film Critics' Circle	2011	Actor of the Year	Tinker Tailor Soldier Spy	Nominated	
London Film Critics' Circle	2011	British Actor of the Year	Tinker Tailor Soldier Spy	Nominated	
London Film Critics' Circle	2013	Dilys Powell Award for Excellence in Film	—N/a	Won	
London Film Critics' Circle	2017	Actor of the Year	Darkest Hour	Nominated	
London Film Critics' Circle	2017	British Actor of the Year	Darkest Hour	Nominated	
Golden Raspberry Awards	1996	Worst Screen Combo (with Demi Moore)	The Scarlet Letter	Nominated	
Independent Spirit Awards	1992	Best Male Lead	Rosencrantz & Guildenstern Are Dead	Nominated	
Independent Spirit Awards	2001	Best Supporting Male	The Contender	Nominated	
Satellite Awards	2011	Best Actor – Motion Picture	Tinker Tailor Soldier Spy	Nominated	
Satellite Awards	2018	Best Actor – Motion Picture	Darkest Hour	Won	
Satellite Awards	2021	Best Actor – Motion Picture Drama	Mank	Nominated	
Satellite Awards	2024	Best Actor – Television Series Drama	Slow Horses	Won	
Saturn Award	1993	Best Actor	Bram Stoker's Dracula	Won	
Saturn Award	1999	Best Supporting Actor	Lost in Space	Nominated	
Saturn Award	2005	Best Supporting Actor	Harry Potter and the Prisoner of Azkaban	Nominated	

== Film critic awards ==
Year	Category	Work	Result	Ref.
Alliance of Women Film Journalists
2017	Best Actor	Darkest Hour	Won	
Black Film Critics Circle
2017	Best Actor	Darkest Hour	Won	
Central Ohio Film Critics Association
2009	Best Cast	The Dark Knight	Won	
2011	Best Cast	Tinker Tailor Soldier Spy	Won	
2017	Best Actor	Darkest Hour	Won	
Chicago Film Critics Association
2011	Best Actor	Tinker Tailor Soldier Spy	Nominated	
2017	Best Actor	Darkest Hour	Nominated	
Chicago Indie Critics
2017	Best Actor	Darkest Hour	Won	
Dallas–Fort Worth Film Critics Association
2017	Best Actor	Darkest Hour	Won	
Denver Film Critics Society
2017	Best Actor	Darkest Hour	Won	
Dublin Film Critics Circle
2011	Best Actor	Tinker Tailor Soldier Spy	Nominated	
2011	Top Ten Actors	Tinker Tailor Soldier Spy	Won	
Georgia Film Critics Association
2011	Best Actor	Tinker Tailor Soldier Spy	Nominated	
2011	Best Cast	Tinker Tailor Soldier Spy	Won	
Iowa Film Critics Association
2017	Best Actor	Darkest Hour	Won	
Los Angeles Online Film Critics Society
2017	Best Actor	Darkest Hour	Won	
National Society of Film Critics
2011	Best Actor	Tinker Tailor Soldier Spy	Nominated	
Nevada Film Critics Society
2017	Best Actor	Darkest Hour	Won	
New York Film Critics Online
2017	Best Actor	Darkest Hour	Won	
North Carolina Film Critics Association
2017	Best Actor	Darkest Hour	Won	
North Texas Film Critics Association
2017	Best Actor	Darkest Hour	Won	
Oklahoma Film Critics Circle
2017	Best Actor	Darkest Hour	Won	
Online Film Critics Society
2011	Best Actor	Tinker Tailor Soldier Spy	Nominated	
2017	Best Actor	Darkest Hour	Won	
Phoenix Film Critics Society
2011	Best Actor	Tinker Tailor Soldier Spy	Nominated	
2017	Best Actor	Darkest Hour	Won	
San Diego Film Critics Society
2011	Best Performance by an Ensemble	Harry Potter and the Deathly Hallows – Part 2	Won	
San Francisco Film Critics Circle
2011	Best Actor	Tinker Tailor Soldier Spy	Won	
St. Louis Film Critics Association
2017	Best Actor	Darkest Hour	Won	
St. Louis Gateway Film Critics Association
2011	Best Actor	Tinker Tailor Soldier Spy	Nominated	
Southeastern Film Critics Association
2017	Best Actor	Darkest Hour	Won	
Washington D.C. Area Film Critics Association
2011	Best Ensemble	Harry Potter and the Deathly Hallows – Part 2	Nominated	
2017	Best Actor	Darkest Hour	Won	
Women Film Critics Circle
2017	Best Actor	Darkest Hour	Won	

== Festival awards ==
Year	Category	Work	Result	Ref.
Cannes Film Festival
1997	Palme d'Or	Nil by Mouth	Nominated	
Edinburgh Film Festival
1997	Channel 4 Award for Best Director	Nil by Mouth	Won	
Palm Springs Film Festival
2011	International Star Award	Tinker Tailor Soldier Spy	Won	
2017	Desert Palm Achievement Award	Darkest Hour	Won	
2020	Chairman's Award	Mank	Won	

== See also ==
- Gary Oldman filmography
