= Friends season 7 =

Season of television series

Friends
- Season 7
- Friends season 7 DVD cover
- Showrunners: David Crane; Marta Kauffman
- Starring: Jennifer Aniston; Courteney Cox Arquette; Lisa Kudrow; Matt LeBlanc; Matthew Perry; David Schwimmer
- No. of episodes: 24

Release
- Original network: NBC
- Original release: October 12, 2000 – May 17, 2001

Season chronology
- ← Previous; Season 6 Next → Season 8

The seventh season of the American television sitcom Friends aired on NBC from October 12, 2000 to May 17, 2001.

== Cast and characters ==
=== Main cast ===
- Jennifer Aniston as Rachel Green
- Courteney Cox Arquette as Monica Geller
- Lisa Kudrow as Phoebe Buffay
- Matt LeBlanc as Joey Tribbiani
- Matthew Perry as Chandler Bing
- David Schwimmer as Ross Geller

=== Recurring cast ===
- Elliott Gould as Jack Geller
- Christina Pickles as Judy Geller
- Eddie Cahill as Tag Jones
- Kathleen Turner as Helena Handbasket
- Morgan Fairchild as Nora Bing
- James Michael Tyler as Gunther
- Maggie Wheeler as Janice Litman
- Cole Sprouse as Ben Geller

=== Guest stars ===
- Kristin Davis as Erin
- Hank Azaria as David
- Susan Sarandon as Cecilia Monroe
- Eva Amurri as Dina
- Gabrielle Union as Kristen Lang
- Jason Alexander as Earl
- Denise Richards as Cassie Geller
- Winona Ryder as Melissa Warburton
- June Gable as Estelle Leonard
- Gary Oldman as Richard Crosby
- David Sutcliffe as Kyle
- Jane Sibbett as Carol Willick Bunch
- Stacy Galina as Julie
- Alison Sweeney as Jessica Ashley
- Vince Vieluf as Ned Morse

== Episodes ==
No. overall	No. in season	Title	Directed by	Written by	Original release date	Prod. code	U.S. viewers (millions)	Rating/share (18–49)
147	1	"The One with Monica's Thunder"	Kevin S. Bright	Story by : Wil Calhoun; Teleplay by : David Crane & Marta Kauffman	October 12, 2000	226401	25.54	13.7/38
The gang prepare to celebrate the engagement of Monica and Chandler. However, plans are upended when Monica walks in on Ross and Rachel kissing in the hallway, and she accuses them of stealing her thunder; Ross and Rachel had been planning a "bonus night", where two exes have a one-night stand. Meanwhile, Chandler has bedroom-related problems, Joey intends to audition for the role of a 19-year-old, and Phoebe wants to play her guitar at Monica’s and Chandler’s wedding.
148	2	"The One with Rachel's Book"	Michael Lembeck	Andrew Reich & Ted Cohen	October 12, 2000	226402	27.93	15.4/39
Monica is devastated that her parents have spent her entire wedding fund to build their beach cottage. She soon perks up after learning that Chandler has just enough money to pay for her dream wedding. However, Chandler's refusal to use all the money on their wedding instead of saving it for their future causes an argument between the two. Joey teases Rachel after finding an erotic novel that she is reading. Phoebe temporarily moves into Ross's apartment and brings all her massage clients to the apartment, much to Ross’s dismay. However, when an attractive woman shows up for a drop-in appointment while Phoebe is gone, Ross pretends to be a masseuse, only to discover that the client is her father instead of her. Ross’s unprofessional behaviour during the massage costs Phoebe one of her loyal clients.
149	3	"The One with Phoebe's Cookies"	Gary Halvorson	Sherry Bilsing & Ellen Plummer	October 19, 2000	226403	22.72	11.7/35
Phoebe offers to give her grandmother's secret cookie recipe to Monica as an engagement gift, but the recipe was destroyed in the fire. Monica obsessively attempts to recreate it, only to learn later that the recipe is Nestle Toll House’s. Rachel offers to teach Joey how to sail, but soon finds herself being verbally abusive to him for his lax attitude. Her abusive teaching style makes her realize that she is acting just like her nasty father back when he taught her sailing. Chandler's new eyeglasses fog up in the gym steam room, so he removes them and this causes him to accidentally sit on his future father-in-law's nude lap.
150	4	"The One with Rachel's Assistant"	David Schwimmer	Brian Boyle	October 26, 2000	226404	22.66	11.7/32
Rachel must choose between a hunky young guy, Tag, and an experienced and well-qualified woman to hire as her executive assistant. Joey is offered the part of Dr. Stryker Ramoray, the twin of his old character Dr. Drake Ramoray, on Days of Our Lives, but is offended when he is asked to audition for the part. However, when Mac and C.H.E.E.S.E. is cancelled, Joey finds himself crawling back to the producers and eventually gets hired back onto the show as Dr. Drake Ramoray who is now recovering from his big fall down an elevator shaft. Monica, Chandler, and Ross reveal all untold secrets about one another: Monica tells Phoebe's secret about a massage employee getting fired, Chandler reveals about his trip to Disneyland where Ross ended up ill on a ride after eating road-side tacos, Ross tells Monica about an Atlantic City trip where Chandler accidentally kissed a guy, Fat Monica ate her macaroni diorama, and Ross slept with the cleaning lady back in college.
151	5	"The One with the Engagement Picture"	Gary Halvorson	Story by : Earl Davis; Teleplay by : Patty Lin	November 2, 2000	226405	24.43	12.8/34
Chandler is unable to smile naturally for his and Monica's engagement photo, so Monica ends up taking a photo with Joey. Joey teaches Tag how to pick up women, much to Rachel's annoyance. Ross and Phoebe date a couple who are divorcing.
152	6	"The One with the Nap Partners"	Gary Halvorson	Brian Buckner & Sebastian Jones	November 9, 2000	226406	22.01	11.2/30
Joey and Ross accidentally take a nap together and, much to their dismay, find that they like it. Phoebe and Rachel compete to be Monica's maid-of-honor with the help of Joey and Ross. Chandler's breakup with a past girlfriend, due to her being overweight, places Monica in doubt about him being committed to their relationship.
153	7	"The One with Ross' Library Book"	David Schwimmer	Scott Silveri	November 16, 2000	226407	23.73	12.1/32
Ross is excited that his dissertation has been published and is currently placed in the school library, but he soon learns that it is in an isolated aisle where students go to hook up. He then tries guarding the aisle (and effectively his dissertation) from more potential hook-ups, but soon finds himself jumping on the bandwagon when he encounters a woman there who admires his work, and the pair ends up getting caught by the library staff. Rachel and Phoebe believe that they have found the perfect girl (Kristin Davis) for Joey. When Janice invites herself to Chandler’s and Monica's wedding, the couple tries dissuading her from attending by convincing her that Chandler still has feelings for her.
154	8	"The One Where Chandler Doesn't Like Dogs"	Kevin S. Bright	Patty Lin	November 23, 2000	226408	16.57	7.3/22
Phoebe sneaks a dog into the apartment; Chandler reveals that he hates dogs. Ross becomes obsessed with naming all fifty U.S. states in order to earn his Thanksgiving dinner. After learning that Tag has broken up with his girlfriend and has nowhere to go for Thanksgiving, Rachel invites him to Monica’s and Chandler's apartment. She is hesitant to tell Tag that she has a crush on him.
155	9	"The One with All the Candy"	David Schwimmer	Wil Calhoun	December 7, 2000	226409	21.08	11.0/30
Monica's plan to get to know her neighbours backfires when she is overworked. Phoebe finally gets her own bicycle, thanks to Ross, but has never learned to ride a bike. Rachel’s and Tag's relationship is nearly discovered at Ralph Lauren.
156	10	"The One with the Holiday Armadillo"	Gary Halvorson	Gregory S. Malins	December 14, 2000	226410	23.26	11.5/32
Ross wants to introduce his half-Jewish son to Hanukkah, but the latter loves Christmas, so, unable to get a Santa costume, Ross dresses up as the "Holiday Armadillo" and tries to get Ben excited about the festivities of Hanukkah. Phoebe’s and Rachel's apartment has been repaired, but Phoebe fears that Rachel prefers living at Joey's. In order to get Rachel to live with her again, Phoebe presents Joey with various gifts: a spider that scares Joey more than Rachel and a drum kit that annoys Monica. In 2019, The Herald-Dispatch called it the third best Christmas TV episode of all time.
157	11	"The One with All the Cheesecakes"	Gary Halvorson	Shana Goldberg-Meehan	January 4, 2001	226411	24.37	12.4/32
Rachel and Chandler get hooked on the home-delivered cheesecakes meant for another tenant. David (Hank Azaria), Phoebe's Scientist Guy, is in town for just one night and wishes to have dinner with Phoebe. However, she already has dinner plans with Joey. Phoebe has to decide whether to blow Joey off after criticising him for having done it to her the night before. Monica is upset that she is not invited to her cousin Frannie’s wedding. Monica goes as Ross’s plus-one anyway, only to discover that Frannie is marrying Stuart, who once slept with her.
158	12	"The One Where They're Up All Night"	Kevin S. Bright	Zack Rosenblatt	January 11, 2001	226412	22.86	11.6/30
The gang is awake for the entire night after trying to see a comet from the rooftop. Monica and Chandler are unable to sleep and decide to have sex, but she falls asleep mid-sex. Rachel and Tag go back to the office to search for a business file that she claims he has misplaced. Joey and Ross get stuck on the roof and try to escape. Phoebe's smoke detector goes off and will not stop beeping, leading to a run-in with a firefighter.
159	13	"The One Where Rosita Dies"^{†}	Stephen Prime	Story by : Ellen Plummer & Sherry Bilsing; Teleplay by : Brian Buckner & Sebastian Jones	February 1, 2001	226413	22.24	10.8/27
Rachel accidentally breaks Rosita, Joey’s recliner, while trying to shift it. When Rachel goes out with Joey to buy a new recliner, Chandler goes into Joey’s apartment and sits on the already-broken Rosita, causing him to think that he has broken his best friend’s favourite recliner. Guilt-stricken, he secretly swaps Rosita out for his own recliner. As a result, Joey believes that Rosita has been "healed", and Rachel gets to keep the new and luxurious La-Z-Boy for herself. Joey, who is jealous that Rachel gets the better chair, breaks “Rosita” once again in order to claim the new chair for himself. Ross and Monica visit their childhood home to collect old belongings before the house is sold. However, Monica learns that all the boxes that contain her childhood items were used to protect Jack’s Porsche during a flood in the garage; all her items were ruined, while Ross's were protected and completely intact. To mollify Monica, Jack gives her the Porsche, much to Ross’s dismay. Phoebe takes a telemarketing job selling printer toner and tries to save a customer named Earl (Jason Alexander) from committing suicide.
160	14	"The One Where They All Turn Thirty"^{†}	Ben Weiss	Story by : Vanessa McCarthy; Teleplay by : Ellen Plummer & Sherry Bilsing	February 8, 2001	226414	22.40	11.2/27
Rachel frets over turning 30, prompting everyone else to remember what they did when they reached the same milestone. Joey ruined his party due to being distraught over his aging; Chandler's party was ruined by Joey for the same reasoning; Ross had a crisis and bought a vintage car which the gang then struggles to get out of its parking spot; Monica turned up to the surprise party Chandler planned blackout drunk; and Phoebe completed her list of life goals before 30, only to discover from Ursula that they are actually one year older than she assumed. When Rachel thinks about her future she realizes that Tag is too young and immature for her plans, so she breaks up with him.
161	15	"The One with Joey's New Brain"^{†}	Kevin S. Bright	Story by : Sherry Bilsing & Ellen Plummer; Teleplay by : Andrew Reich & Ted Cohen	February 15, 2001	226415	21.75	10.6/27
Joey learns that his Days of our Lives character, Dr. Drake Ramoray, will be coming out of a coma by having the brain of a killed-off female character, Jessica Lockhart, transplanted into his body. In hope of learning more about Jessica’s motivation on the show, Joey visits the actress playing Jessica, Cecilia Monroe (Susan Sarandon), and accidentally tells her that Jessica will be killed off in favour of Dr. Drake Ramoray’s reintegration into the show, which infuriates Cecilia. Joey then charms Cecilia into working together to maintain Jessica’s legacy on the show, and the two end up sleeping together. Ross cooks up a special surprise for his sister’s wedding: dreadful bagpipe playing. After a cute guy accidentally leaves his phone in the coffee house, Phoebe and Rachel compete over who gets to keep it in order to start 'a fairytale for the digital age'. Later, an elderly gentleman drops by Phoebe's apartment to claim the phone, and much to Rachel's bewilderment, Phoebe happily goes to dinner with him as she finds him more attractive than the cute guy from the coffee house.
162	16	"The One with the Truth About London"^{†}	David Schwimmer	Story by : Brian Buckner & Sebastian Jones; Teleplay by : Zachary Rosenblatt	February 22, 2001	226416	21.22	9.9/24
Rachel teaches Ben practical jokes, much to Ross’s chagrin. Meanwhile, Chandler becomes paranoid when he learns that Monica was actually planning to sleep with Joey the night they first got together, and Joey becomes ordained over the Internet in preparation to officiate Monica’s and Chandler's wedding. Note: Last appearance of Jane Sibbett as Carol Willick Bunch.
163	17	"The One with the Cheap Wedding Dress"	Kevin S. Bright	Story by : Brian Buckner & Sebastian Jones; Teleplay by : Andrew Reich & Ted Cohen	March 15, 2001	226417	20.84	10.0/29
Monica beats another bride-to-be in a fight over a discounted wedding dress. However, her happiness is short-lived when she is forced to relinquish her prize after the other bride-to-be blackmails her into giving the dress back by booking Chandler's favorite band on the same day as her wedding. Meanwhile, Joey and Ross are interested in the same girl (Gabrielle Union) and go to drastic measures to win her.
164	18	"The One with Joey's Award"	Gary Halvorson	Story by : Sherry Bilsing & Ellen Plummer; Teleplay by : Brian Boyle	March 29, 2001	226418	17.81	8.1/21
Joey proves to be a sore loser after being nominated for a "Soapie" award. When he accepts an award from a different category on behalf of a co-star, he is unwilling to hand it over. However, he later keeps the award anyway when the actress who has won it considers it insignificant. Meanwhile, a male student in Ross’s class angles for a higher test grade by claiming that he loves Ross. Another student reveals that the guy is actually straight, and has used the same ploy on other professors. Ross then gives the student a failing grade, but ends up giving him a "C" after some of Ross's colleagues overhear a conversation which sounds like Ross and the student dated. Upon seeing Phoebe develop a relationship quickly with Jake, Monica panics as she realizes that she will never be able to experience the excitement of new relationship moments again now that she is marrying Chandler. When she talks to Chandler about her fears, he reveals that he was extremely anxious when they first started dating, but is now more excited about spending the rest of their lives together, which calms Monica down.
165	19	"The One with Ross and Monica's Cousin"	Gary Halvorson	Andrew Reich & Ted Cohen	April 19, 2001	226419	16.55	7.7/22
Ross’s and Monica's gorgeous cousin, Cassie (Denise Richards) visits, and Chandler, Ross, and Phoebe become attracted to her. Rachel and Phoebe throw a last-minute bridal shower for Monica. Joey auditions for a part which is perfect for him, apart from it calling for an uncircumcised actor (and Joey is circumcised). Upon finding out he lied about his 'downstairs' area, Monica tries to fix it so he can still get the part, using a variety of methods including Silly Putty and cold cuts. Note: The sub-plot where Joey auditions for the role of an uncircumcised man was originally written for "The One with Barry and Mindy's Wedding", but the story was changed on the advice of network censors, who thought it was inappropriate.
166	20	"The One with Rachel's Big Kiss"	Gary Halvorson	Scott Silveri & Shana Goldberg-Meehan	April 26, 2001	226420	16.30	8.1/24
Rachel runs into Melissa (Winona Ryder), a former sorority sister with whom she once had a passionate kiss. However, Melissa denies it ever happened. Phoebe disbelieves that Rachel is capable of kissing a woman, so the latter recreates the kiss with surprising results: Melissa does remember and has feelings for Rachel. Meanwhile, Chandler is excited when he rents the same tuxedo that Pierce Brosnan had worn as James Bond, but feels outdone when Ross claims to have tried on the same tux that Val Kilmer had worn in Batman Forever. However, Ross’s tux turns out to be the one Val wore at a different movie.
167	21	"The One with the Vows"	Gary Halvorson	Doty Abrams	May 3, 2001	226421	15.65	7.6/21
Chandler and Monica struggle to write their wedding vows. Meanwhile, the rest of the gang reminisces the couple’s journey over the past few years via flashbacks. Note: This is a clip show and was the lowest-rated episode in the series with 15.65 million viewers.
168	22	"The One with Chandler's Dad"	Kevin S. Bright & Gary Halvorson	Story by : Gregory S. Malins; Teleplay by : Brian Buckner & Sebastian Jones	May 10, 2001	226424	17.23	8.6/27
Chandler tries to reconcile with his estranged gay father (Kathleen Turner), at the behest of Monica: the couple goes to Vegas to attend one of Mr. Bing's drag shows, where the father and son finally reconcile, and Mr. Bing agrees to attend the wedding. Rachel, who is an irresponsible driver, takes Monica's Porsche for a spin with a fearful Ross, and ends up getting caught driving without a valid license. She then flirts with the officer to avoid getting a ticket. Later, Ross is pulled over for driving too slowly on the freeway and attempts to flirt his way out of getting a ticket as well, but to no avail. Meanwhile, Joey takes Phoebe's advice about his masculinity, which results in him trying on women's underwear.
169	23	"The One with Monica and Chandler's Wedding"	Kevin S. Bright	Gregory S. Malins	May 17, 2001 (Note: These episodes originally aired as a single double-length episode but are sometimes split into two episodes for syndication, reruns and DVD presentation.)	226422	30.05	15.7/43
170	24	"The One with Monica and Chandler's Wedding"	Kevin S. Bright	Marta Kauffman & David Crane	May 17, 2001	226423	30.05	15.7/43
Joey gets an important role in a major movie about World War I, learns the art of enunciation (and therein spitting) from his famous co-star (Gary Oldman), and later discovers that he is supposed to work on the day of Monica’s and Chandler's wedding. Chandler's fear of commitment overwhelms him and he runs away before the wedding. Phoebe finds a positive pregnancy test in Monica's bathroom trash, and assumes it is Monica’s. Joey is relieved that he only has to shoot one scene before he can leave to officiate the wedding, but his co-star turns up drunk and ruins his chances of making it to the wedding on time. Chandler is eventually found hiding in his office, but disappears again upon overhearing Phoebe and Rachel discussing Monica's assumed pregnancy. Luckily, he turns up again and starts accepting that he is going to be a father. Joey arrives just in time to perform the ceremony while still wearing his World War I movie costume. Chandler and Monica finally become husband and wife while marrying to the tune of the song "Everlong" by Foo Fighters. At the end of the episode, Chandler announces to Monica that he knows about the baby. Monica is surprised and denies the fact that she is pregnant which brings up the question about who is. The camera then zooms into Rachel's face suggesting that the pregnancy test is hers.

^† denotes a "super-sized" 40-minute episode (with advertisements; actual runtime around 28 minutes).

== Home media ==
The seventh season was officially released on DVD in region 1 on April 6, 2004, as a 4-disc DVD Box Set. The release includes the extended versions of every episode with footage not seen on their original NBC broadcast. Special Features include 3 audio commentaries, a video guide to season seven's guest stars, a trivia quiz and Easter Eggs about the next season. For region 2, the release included the original NBC broadcast version of the episodes, and not the extended versions unlike the region 1 release.

Season 7 was released on Blu-ray altogether with the rest of the series on the Complete Series releases; in this releases the episodes are presented in their original NBC broadcast versions and does not include the extra deleted scenes and jokes that were included in the DVD version. Although, the set did include the original "super-sized" broadcast versions of several episodes of seasons 7, 9 & 10 as part of the special features; however, only the episodes of Season 7 are not presented in High Definition and are instead included in Standard Definition. Additional audio & subtitle tracks are also included with this releases.

Friends: The Complete Seventh Season
Set Details		Special Features
23 episodes (1 double-length episode); 4-disc set (DVD)/2 Discs (Blu-ray); English (Dolby 5.0 Surround) (DVD)/English (Dolby Digital 5.1) (Blu-ray); English, French & Spanish subtitles; Audio Commentaries; 576 minutes (DVD); 548 minutes (Blu-ray)		Over 51 minutes of Never-Before-Seen footage included on every episode (DVD Only); Producers Commentary on 3 episodes: "The One with the Holiday Armadillo", "The One with Joey's New Brain" and "The One with Monica and Chandler's Wedding"; Friends of Friends: Video Guestbook; Gag Reel; Monica's Wedding Book Challenge: Trivia Quiz (DVD Only) (Note: Not available on the 2019 re-release of the DVD's); Gunther Spills the Beans About Next Season: Season 8 Easter Eggs; "The Ones with More Friends" - 4 Original Broadcast "Super Sized" Episodes: "The One Where They All Turn Thirty", "The One Where Rosita Dies", "The One with Joey's New Brain" and "The One with the Truth About London" (Blu-ray only)
Release Dates
Region 1	Region 2	Region 4
April 6, 2004	October 25, 2004	October 4, 2006

== Reception ==
Collider ranked the season Number 4 on their ranking of all ten Friends seasons, and named "The One with Monica and Chandler's Wedding" as its standout episode.
