= Laila Morse =

English actress (born 1945)

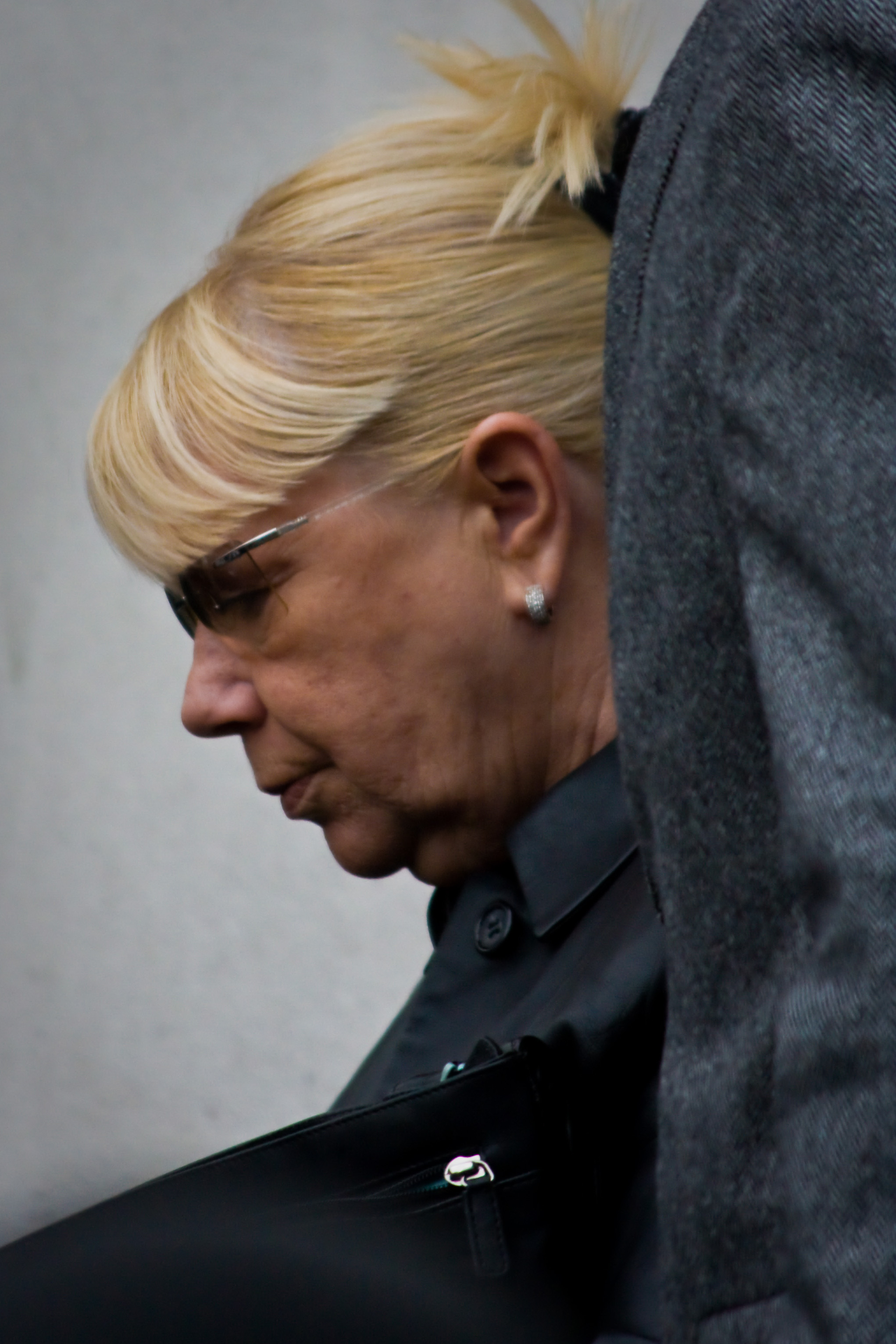
- Morse in 2009 at Wendy Richard's funeral
- Born: Maureen Lesley Oldman; 1 August 1945 (age 81); Dorking, Surrey, England
- Occupation: Actress
- Years active: 1995–present
- Television: EastEnders; Dancing on Ice; I'm a Celebrity...Get Me Out of Here!
- Spouses: Gerald Bromfield (m. 1963; div. 1970) James Bass (m. 1994; div. 2003)
- Children: 2
- Relatives: Gary Oldman (brother)

Maureen Lesley Bass (née Oldman; born 1 August 1945), better known by her stage name Laila Morse, is an English actress. After making her acting debut as Janet in the drama film Nil by Mouth (1997), she went on to join the BBC soap opera EastEnders as Mo Harris, a role she has played periodically since 2000.

== Early life ==
Laila Morse was born Maureen Lesley Oldman on 1 August 1945, to Leonard Bertram Oldman (1921–1985), a former sailor who also worked as a welder, and Kathleen (née Cheriton; 1919–2018). Her younger brother is actor and filmmaker Gary Oldman.

== Career ==
=== Early work ===
At the age of 51, Morse made her professional acting debut as Janet in the 1997 film Nil by Mouth. The BAFTA winning film also marked the writing and directing debut of her actor brother Gary. Morse's performance as the matriarch won her the award of 'Most Promising Newcomer in any Category' at the British Independent Film Awards.

Morse's television debut was as Janice Ryan in an episode of The Bill, which was followed by a regular role as Honky Mum in the BBC sitcom Honky Sausages, and the character Molly in the 1999 television production of Great Expectations. In 2000, Morse played Laila in the film Love, Honour and Obey.

=== EastEnders ===
In September 2000, Morse made her first appearance as Mo Harris in the BBC soap opera EastEnders. Introduced as the matriarch of the Slater family, her first scene in the soap was alongside Pam St Clement, who played Pat Butcher. A couple of weeks later, a television critic said that Morse had acted like "a lump of cardboard". Recalling the article, Morse replied: "I daresay he was right! I was bloody petrified." She admitted that it was only three years later that she started to feel comfortable on set. Morse temporarily left EastEnders in January 2016, after appearing on a recurring basis since July 2012. In June 2017, Morse expressed interest in returning to EastEnders as she felt that she never "officially left". In December 2017, it was announced that Morse would be returning to the show to play Mo. She returned in March 2018, after being re-introduced alongside Jean (Gillian Wright) and Kat Slater (Jessie Wallace). In February 2021, it was announced that Morse would be departing the soap again, with the character's exit scenes airing in June 2021. A year later, it was announced that Morse would reprise the role for a short stint later that year, with the character appearing in five episodes between August and September 2022. In February 2024, it was announced that Morse would reprising the role on a permanent basis, following a storyline accommodating the return of Freddie Slater (Bobby Brazier). She returned in May 2024.

=== Other work ===
In 2011, Morse made a return to film when she appeared as Aunt Queenie in the film Big Fat Gypsy Gangster, written, produced and starring Ricky Grover. In December 2012, Morse made her pantomime debut as the Fairy in a production of Jack and the Beanstalk.

In January 2012, Morse took part in the seventh series of ITV celebrity edition skating show Dancing on Ice. She was paired with Łukasz Różycki and they were the second couple to be eliminated.

Morse published her autobiography Just A Mo in 2013. In November 2013, Morse participated in the thirteenth series of I'm a Celebrity...Get Me Out of Here! and was the second participant to be voted out of the series on 2 December.

In June 2016, it was announced that she would be taking part in the BBC series of Celebrity Masterchef. The series was won by Alexis Conran.

In 2019, Morse appeared as an BPRD employee in Hellboy. In 2021, it was announced that Morse was leaving EastEnders when her contract ended.

In 2021, Morse took part in the ITV series Strictly the Real Full Monty, where she was partnered with Homes Under the Hammer presenter Martin Roberts. Morse was praised by viewers when she revealed her breast cancer scars.

In 2026, Morse appeared in an advertising campaign for the sportswear company Reebok, "The Give Back" celebrating the brand's British heritage. Morse appeared in a photoshoot, as well as a video clip for the campaign, in which her hair was styled in tight curls, with Morse wearing gold jewellery, a grey joggers and sweatshirt and a brown camel coat with faux-fur trim.

== Personal life ==
Morse's stage name was suggested by the Italian actress Isabella Rossellini, who was dating Morse's brother, actor Gary Oldman. "Laila Morse" is an anagram of "mia sorella" which is Italian for "my sister". Morse was married to Gerald Bromfield from 1963 to 1970 and they had two children, Gerry and Tracy Bromfield. Morse married for a second time to James Bass in 1994. The marriage ended in divorce nine years later.

Morse is a survivor of breast cancer, having been diagnosed with the illness in May 2001 and recovered within a year. Morse revealed it had been Wendy Richard who had persuaded her to get a breast lump checked by doctors.

During the evening of 29 June 2008, Dano Sonnex and Nigel Farmer attempted to burgle Morse's home, just hours before they committed the New Cross double murder.

In August 2013, Morse was declared bankrupt.

== Filmography ==
Year	Title	Role	Notes	Ref.
1997	Nil By Mouth	Janet	Film role	
1997	The Bill	Janice Ryan	Episode: "No Guarantees"	
1998	One in Something	—N/a	Film role	
1999	Honky Sausages	Honky Mum	1 episode	
1999	Great Expectations	Molly	Film role	
2000	Love, Honour and Obey	Laila	Film role	
2000–2016, 2018–2022, 2024–present	EastEnders	Mo Harris	Series regular	
2003	Slaters in Detention	Mo Harris	EastEnders spin-off	
2004	Pat and Mo	Mo Harris	EastEnders spin-off	
2009	Hell's Kitchen	Herself	Guest	
2010	EastEnders: E20	Mo Harris	EastEnders spin-off	
2011	Big Fat Gypsy Gangster	Aunt Queenie	Film role	
2012	Dancing on Ice	Herself	Contestant; series 7	
2013	I'm a Celebrity...Get Me Out of Here!	Herself	Contestant; series 13	
2016	Celebrity MasterChef	Herself	Contestant; series 11	
2019	Hellboy	Employee	Film role	
2021	Strictly The Real Full Monty	Herself	Participant	

Television guest appearances

- The Alan Titchmarsh Show (2008) – Guest
- Come Dine with Me (2009) – Contestant
- The Weakest Link (2010) – Contestant
- Pointless Celebrities (2012) – Contestant
- Sunday Side Up (29 December 2013) – Guest
- The Chase: Celebrity Special (4 October 2014) – Contestant
- Celebrity Antiques Road Trip (30 January 2024) – Guest

== Awards and nominations ==
Year	Award	Category	Nominated work	Result	Ref.
1998	British Independent Film Awards	Most Promising Newcomer	Nil by Mouth	Won	
2024	Inside Soap Awards	Best Comic Performance	EastEnders	Nominated	
