= Gary Oldman =

English actor and filmmaker (born 1958)

Sir Gary Oldman
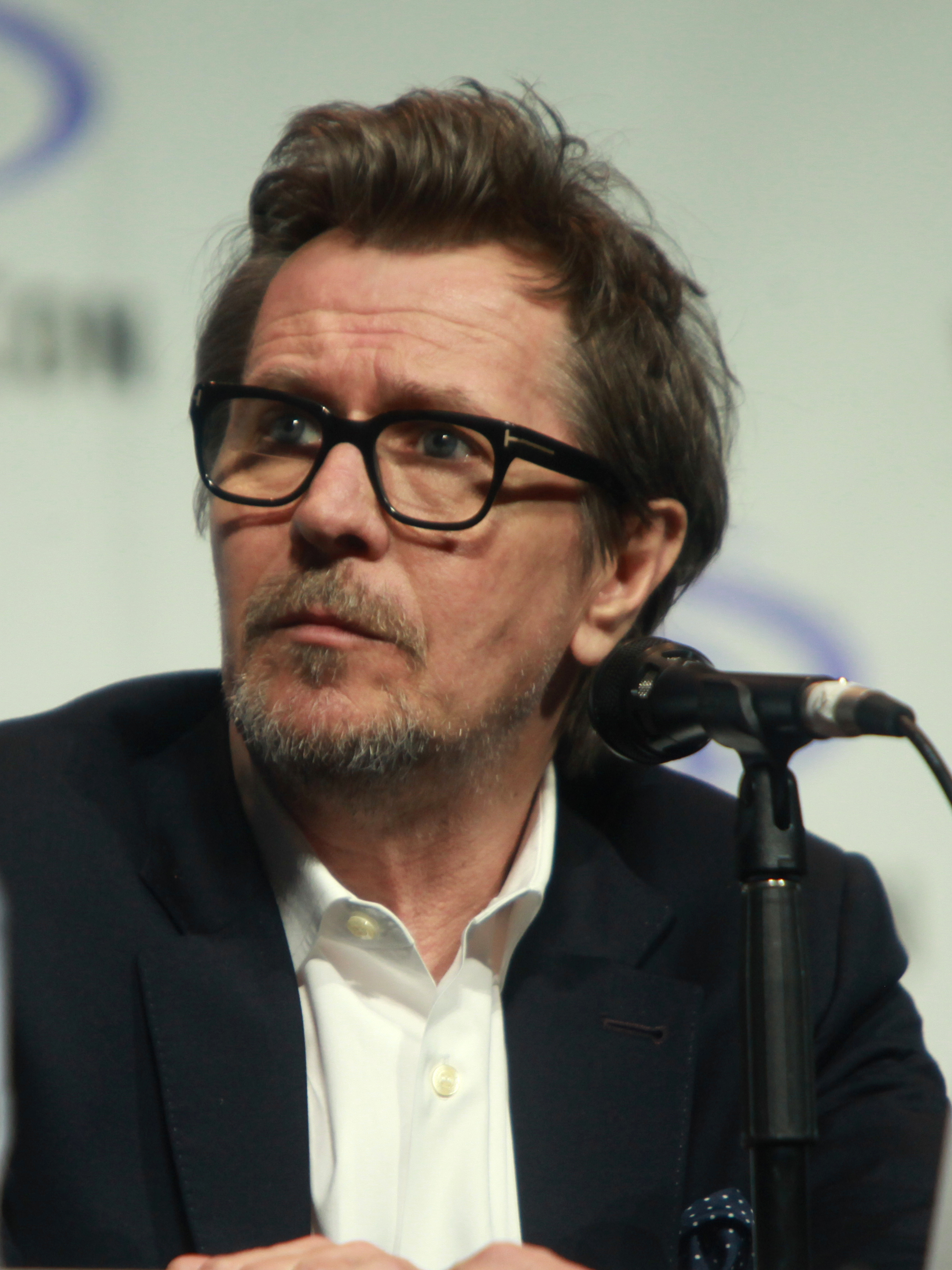
- Oldman in 2014
- Born: Gary Leonard Oldman; 21 March 1958 (age 68); London, England
- Education: Rose Bruford College (BA)
- Occupations: Actor; filmmaker
- Years active: 1979–present
- Works: Full list
- Spouses: Lesley Manville (m. 1987; div. 1990); Uma Thurman (m. 1990; div. 1992); Donya Fiorentino (m. 1997; div. 2001); Alexandra Edenborough (m. 2008; div. 2015); Gisele Schmidt (m. 2017)
- Partner: Isabella Rossellini (1994–1996)
- Children: 3
- Relatives: Laila Morse (sister)
- Awards: Full list

Sir Gary Leonard Oldman (born 21 March 1958) is an English actor and filmmaker. Known for his versatility and intense acting style, he has received various accolades, including an Academy Award, a Golden Globe Award and three BAFTAs, as well as nominations for four Primetime Emmy Awards. His films have grossed over US$11 billion worldwide, making him one of the highest-grossing actors of all time.

Oldman began acting in theatre in 1979 and made his film debut in Remembrance (1982). He appeared in the Royal Court Theatre in London and was a member of the Royal Shakespeare Company, with credits including Cabaret, Romeo and Juliet, Entertaining Mr Sloane, Saved, The Country Wife and Hamlet. He rose to prominence in British film with his portrayals of Sid Vicious in Sid and Nancy (1986), Joe Orton in Prick Up Your Ears (1987) and Rosencrantz in Rosencrantz & Guildenstern Are Dead (1990). Regarded as a member of the "Brit Pack", he achieved greater recognition as an American gangster in State of Grace (1990), Lee Harvey Oswald in JFK (1991) and Count Dracula in Bram Stoker's Dracula (1992).

Oldman portrayed villainous characters in True Romance (1993), Léon: The Professional (1994), The Fifth Element (1997), Air Force One (1997) and The Contender (2000). He has also played franchise roles such as Sirius Black in the Harry Potter series (2004–2011), James Gordon in The Dark Knight trilogy (2005–2012), Lord Shen in Kung Fu Panda 2 (2011) and Dreyfus in Dawn of the Planet of the Apes (2014). He won the Academy Award for Best Actor for his role as Sir Winston Churchill in the historical drama Darkest Hour (2017). He was nominated for an Academy Award for his portrayals of George Smiley in the thriller Tinker Tailor Soldier Spy (2011) and Herman J. Mankiewicz in the drama Mank (2020).

Oldman wrote and directed the film Nil by Mouth (1997) and starred in the BBC television film The Firm (1989). He has received Primetime Emmy Award nominations for his portrayal of Jackson Lamb, a cantankerous British spy, in the Apple TV+ thriller series Slow Horses (2022–), and his guest role as an inebriated actor in a 2001 double episode of the NBC sitcom Friends. Oldman has acted in music videos for David Bowie, Guns N' Roses and Annie Lennox. He was made a Knight Bachelor by King Charles III in the 2025 Birthday Honours.

== Early life and education ==
Gary Leonard Oldman was born in New Cross, London, on 21 March 1958, the son of Leonard Bertram Oldman (1921–1985), a former sailor who also worked as a welder, and Kathleen (née Cheriton; 1919–2018). He said his father was an alcoholic who left the family when Oldman was seven years old. His older sister, Maureen, is an actress better known as Laila Morse; she performed in Oldman's directorial debut Nil by Mouth (1997), before taking on her most famous role of Mo Harris in the BBC soap opera EastEnders.

Oldman attended West Greenwich School in Deptford, leaving at the age of 16 to work in a sports shop. He played piano as a child, but he gave up his musical aspirations to pursue an acting career after seeing Malcolm McDowell's performance in the film The Raging Moon (1971). In a 1995 interview with Charlie Rose he said, "Something about Malcolm just arrested me, and I connected, and I said, 'I wanna do that.'"

Growing up in south London, Oldman supported his local football club, Millwall, but also followed Manchester United because he idolised George Best. In 2011 he learned from his mother that his father had played for Millwall just after the Second World War: "Just after the war, [my mother] ran a boarding house for football players—Millwall players. And I knew that my dad was involved somehow with the reserve team. But two weeks ago my mum said, 'Oh yeah, your dad played for Millwall. When he was young he had a couple of first team games.'"

Oldman studied with the Young People's Theatre in Greenwich during the mid-1970s, while working jobs on assembly lines, as a porter in an operating theatre, selling shoes and beheading pigs in an abattoir. He applied unsuccessfully to the Royal Academy of Dramatic Art (RADA), which welcomed him to try again the following year, but advised him to find something else to do for a living. When asked by Charlie Rose whether he had reminded the RADA of this, Oldman joked that "the work speaks for itself".

Oldman won a scholarship to attend Rose Bruford College in Sidcup, south-east London, from which he graduated with a BA in acting in 1979. He described himself as a "shy" but diligent worker during his time there, performing roles such as Puck in William Shakespeare's A Midsummer Night's Dream.

== Career ==
=== 1979–1985: Early roles and theatre work ===
After leaving drama school, Oldman was the first in his year to receive professional work; he stated that this was not a result of being the most talented actor, but rather diligence and application. In 1979 he starred in Thark, opposite Annette Kerr, at York Theatre Royal. Subsequent plays included Cabaret, Privates on Parade and Romeo and Juliet. In December 1979 Oldman appeared as Puss in Dick Whittington and His Cat, staged at York. He also acted in Colchester, then with the Citizens Theatre in Glasgow; Oldman's work ethic and trademark intensity would make him a favourite with audiences in Glasgow during the 1980s. He also toured Europe and South America with the Citizens Theatre company.

From 1980 to 1981 Oldman appeared in The Massacre at Paris (Christopher Marlowe), Desperado Corner (Shaun Lawton) and Robert David MacDonald's plays Chinchilla and A Waste of Time. He performed in a 6-month West End run of MacDonald's Summit Conference, opposite Glenda Jackson, in 1982. Also that year, Oldman made his film debut in Colin Gregg's Remembrance, and would have starred in Don Boyd's Gossip if that film had not collapsed. The following year, he landed a starring role as a skinhead in Mike Leigh's film Meantime, and moved on to Chesterfield to assume the lead role in Entertaining Mr Sloane (Joe Orton). He then went to Westcliffe to star in Saved (Edward Bond).

Saved proved to be a major breakthrough for Oldman. Max Stafford-Clark, artistic director of the Royal Court Theatre, had seen Oldman's performance and cast him as Scopey, the lead role of Bond's The Pope's Wedding, in 1984. Clark, speaking to The Times, explained that Oldman suffered from stage fright, which he believed caused Oldman to stick to screen work rather than performing in front of a live audience. For his acclaimed performance, he won two of British theatre's top honours: the Time Out Fringe Award for Best Newcomer, and the Drama Theatre Award for Best Actor—the latter of which was shared with his future film co-star Anthony Hopkins for his performance in Pravda. Oldman's turn in The Pope's Wedding led to a run of work with the Royal Court, and from 1984 to 1986 he appeared in Rat in the Skull (Ron Hutchinson), The Desert Air (Nicholas Wright), Cain and Abel, The Danton Affair (Pam Gems), Women Beware Women (Thomas Middleton), Real Dreams (Trevor Griffiths) and all three of Bond's The War Plays: Red Black and Ignorant, The Tin Can People and Great Peace. Oldman was a member of the Royal Shakespeare Company from 1985 to 1986.

=== 1986–1993: Rise to prominence and breakthrough ===
The 1984 production of The Pope's Wedding had been seen by the director Alex Cox, who offered Oldman the part of the musician Sid Vicious in the 1986 film Sid and Nancy. He twice turned down the role before accepting it, because, in his own words: "I wasn't really that interested in Sid Vicious and the punk movement. I'd never followed it. It wasn't something that interested me. The script I felt was banal and 'who cares' and 'why bother' and all of that. And I was a little bit sort-of with my nose in the air and sort-of thinking 'well the theatre—so much more superior' and all of that." He reconsidered based on the salary and the urging of his agent.

In 1987 Oldman gained his third starring film role as Joe Orton in Prick Up Your Ears, for which he received a BAFTA nomination for Best Actor. That same year, he appeared in the plays The Country Wife (William Wycherley) and Serious Money (Caryl Churchill). The film director Luc Besson told how, on the set of The Fifth Element (1997), Oldman could recite any scene from Hamlet (William Shakespeare), in which he had starred a decade earlier.

Oldman's performances in Sid and Nancy and Prick Up Your Ears paved the way for work in Hollywood, garnering acclaim from the American film critic Roger Ebert. Ebert wrote, "There is no point of similarity between the two performances; like a few gifted actors, [Oldman] is able to re-invent himself for every role. On the basis of these two movies, he is the best young British actor around." Vicious's former Sex Pistols bandmate John Lydon, despite criticising Sid and Nancy, described Oldman as a "bloody good actor". The performance would go on to be ranked No. 62 in Premiere magazine's "100 Greatest Performances of All Time" and No. 8 in Uncut magazine's "10 Best actors in rockin' roles", the latter describing Oldman's portrayal as a "hugely sympathetic reading of the punk figurehead as a lost and bewildered manchild."

In late 1988 he starred opposite the "hero" Alan Bates in We Think the World of You, and in 1989 alongside Dennis Hopper and Frances McDormand in the film Chattahoochee. Also in 1989, Oldman starred as the football hooligan Clive "Bex" Bissel in the controversial British television drama The Firm, giving a performance that Total Film numbered as his best and called "stunning" and "fearless" in 2011. Oldman and other young British actors of the 1980s who were becoming established Hollywood film actors, such as Tim Roth, Bruce Payne, Colin Firth, Daniel Day-Lewis and Paul McGann, were dubbed the "Brit Pack", of which Oldman was de facto leader.

In 1990 Oldman co-starred with Tim Roth in Rosencrantz & Guildenstern Are Dead, Tom Stoppard's film adaptation of his own play of the same name. Total Film praised the film, calling Oldman's character "a blitz of brilliant comedy timing and pitch perfect line delivery." He then starred opposite Sean Penn and Ed Harris in State of Grace (1990); Roger Ebert described Oldman's turn as the highlight, and Janet Maslin referred to his work as "phenomenal". He was offered, but turned down, the lead role in that year's Edward Scissorhands. Oldman moved to the United States in the early 1990s, where he has resided since.

In 1991 he began filming Dylan Thomas, a biopic on the Welsh poet Dylan Thomas, with his then-wife Uma Thurman as Caitlin Thomas; production shut down shortly after filming began. Later in 1991, Oldman starred in his first US blockbuster, playing Lee Harvey Oswald in Oliver Stone's JFK. According to Oldman, very little was written about Oswald in the script. Stone gave him several plane tickets, a list of contacts and told him to do his own research. Oldman met Oswald's wife, Marina, and her two daughters to prepare for the role. He filmed scenes for the 1992 neo-noir thriller Final Analysis, which were cut.

In 1992 he starred as Count Dracula in Francis Ford Coppola's romance-horror Bram Stoker's Dracula. A commercially successful film adaptation of Bram Stoker's 1897 novel, it was a box office success worldwide. Oldman's performance was recognised as the best male performance of 1992 by the Academy of Science Fiction, Fantasy & Horror Films, which awarded Oldman its Best Actor award. He served as a member of the Jury at the 1993 Cannes Film Festival. Oldman became a popular portrayer of villains: he played the violent pimp Drexl Spivey in the Tony Scott-directed, Quentin Tarantino-written True Romance (1993), a role which MSN Movies described as "one of cinema's most memorable villains"; a sadistic prison warden in Murder in the First (1995); futuristic corporate tyrant Jean-Baptiste Emanuel Zorg in The Fifth Element (1997); and Dr. Zachary Smith/Spider Smith in the commercially successful but critically panned Lost in Space (1998). He was considered for two roles in Quentin Tarantino's Pulp Fiction (1994), but neither were realised. Tarantino contemplated Oldman as the gangster Jules Winnfield (played by Samuel L. Jackson), while TriStar executives recommended him for drug dealer Lance (portrayed by Eric Stoltz).

=== 1994–2003: Established actor ===
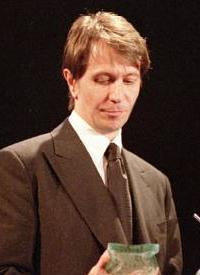
Oldman in 2000

In Léon: The Professional (1994) he played the corrupt US Drug Enforcement Administration officer Norman Stansfield, which has since been named by multiple publications as one of the best villains, and most corrupt police officers, in cinema. He starred as Arthur Dimmesdale in The Scarlet Letter (1995). Oldman also portrayed various accents; along with the Transylvanian Count Dracula, he gave a critically acclaimed reading of Ludwig van Beethoven in Immortal Beloved, and played the Russian terrorist Egor Korshunov in the 1997 blockbuster Air Force One. In 1998 MTV's Celebrity Deathmatch aired a match between claymation representations of Oldman and Christopher Walken to determine the greatest cinematic villain. The following year, Oldman served as executive producer of Plunkett & Macleane, and portrayed another historical figure, Pontius Pilate, in the television film Jesus. He was also considered for the role of Morpheus in The Matrix.

Oldman appeared opposite Jeff Bridges as the zealous American Republican Party congressman Sheldon Runyon in The Contender (2000), of which he was also executive producer. Oldman received a Screen Actors Guild Award nomination for his performance, although some claimed he was dissatisfied with DreamWorks' supposed editing of the film to reflect pro-Democratic Party leanings. These reports were declared "sloppy sensationalism" by his manager, Douglas Urbanski, who said that Oldman was "the least political person I know". He stressed that neither he nor Oldman had made the statements attributed to them, that they had "produced this film, every last cut and frame", and that DreamWorks "did not influence the final cut or have anything to do with it." Urbanski said that Oldman received "creepy phone calls advising him that he was ruining his chances of an Oscar nomination". The notion of Oldman criticising DreamWorks was dispelled as a "myth" by the film critic Roger Ebert.

In 2001 he appeared opposite Anthony Hopkins in Hannibal as Mason Verger, the only surviving victim of Hannibal Lecter. He spent six hours per day in the make-up room to achieve the character's disfigured appearance, and went uncredited in the film. It marked the second time that Oldman had appeared opposite Hopkins, who was part of the supporting cast of Bram Stoker's Dracula. Oldman then returned to television making two guest appearances in the popular NBC sitcom Friends in May 2001, appearing in the two-part episode "The One With Chandler and Monica's Wedding" as Richard Crosby, a pedantic actor who insists that "real" actors spit on one another when they enunciate, leading to tension, then friendship, with Joey Tribbiani (Matt LeBlanc). Oldman had previously worked with LeBlanc on Lost in Space. For his performance he earned a nomination for a Primetime Emmy Award for Outstanding Guest Actor in a Comedy Series, losing to Derek Jacobi for his role on Frasier (2001).

Following his Friends appearance, Oldman did not appear in any major roles until 2004; it was suggested that he was blacklisted in Hollywood during this time, following the controversy that had surrounded the release of The Contender. In 2002 he starred in the generally well-received Interstate 60, and played the Devil in the BMW short film The Hire: Beat the Devil. The Guardian writer Xan Brooks described the early 2000s as Oldman's "low point", recalling "barrel-scraping roles" in the 2003 films Tiptoes and Sin. Although the film failed to impress reviewers, Oldman did garner some praise for his portrayal of a man with dwarfism in Tiptoes: Lisa Nesselson in Variety described his work as "astonishingly fine", and the performance was later mentioned in Mark Kermode's "Great Acting in Bad Films".

=== 2004–2012: Franchise roles and acclaim ===
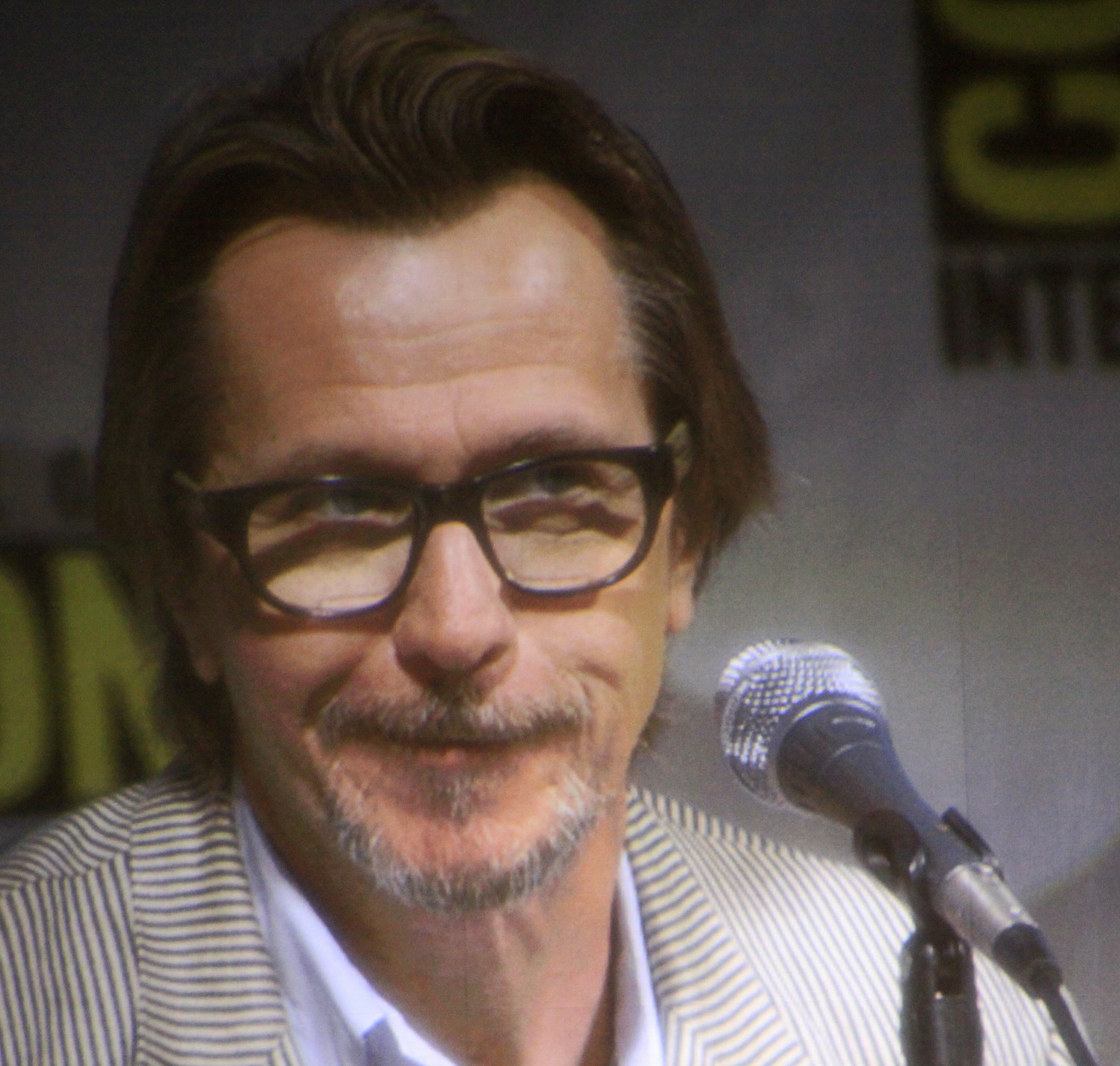
Oldman at the 2009 San Diego Comic-Con

In 2004 Oldman returned to prominence when he landed a starring role in the Harry Potter film series, playing Harry Potter's godfather Sirius Black. He made his first appearance in The Prisoner of Azkaban (2004) to positive reviews with Kenneth Turan of The Chicago Tribune writing, "Doing especially good work are the key people new to the series. Oldman exhibits a delicacy he hasn't always shown with the character of Sirius Black." He continued to portray him in the films The Goblet of Fire (2005), The Order of the Phoenix (2007), The Deathly Hallows Part 2 (2011). The following year, he starred as James "Jim" Gordon in Christopher Nolan's commercially and critically successful Batman Begins (2005), a role that he reprised in the sequels The Dark Knight (2008) and The Dark Knight Rises (2012). The film critic Mark Kermode, in reviewing The Dark Knight, downplayed claims that Heath Ledger's Joker was the highlight of the film, saying, "the best performance in the film, by a mile, is [by] Gary Oldman... it would be lovely to see him get a[n Oscar] nomination because actually, he's the guy who gets kind of overlooked in all of this".

Oldman co-starred with Jim Carrey in the 2009 version of A Christmas Carol in which Oldman played three roles. He had a starring role in David Goyer's supernatural thriller The Unborn, released in 2009. In 2010 Oldman co-starred with Denzel Washington in The Book of Eli. He also played a lead role in Catherine Hardwicke's Red Riding Hood. Oldman voiced the role of villain Lord Shen and was nominated for an Annie Award for his performance in Kung Fu Panda 2.

Oldman received strong reviews and earned his first Academy Award nomination and a BAFTA Award nomination for his portrayal of the British spy George Smiley in Tinker Tailor Soldier Spy (2011), an adaptation of the John le Carré novel, directed by Tomas Alfredson. To prepare for the role of George Smiley, Oldman gained 15 pounds, watched Alec Guinness's performance in Tinker Tailor Soldier Spy, and paid a visit to Smiley's creator John le Carré to perfect the character's voice. In 2012 Oldman played Floyd Banner, a big-hitting mobster, in John Hillcoat's Lawless, alongside Tom Hardy, Shia LaBeouf, Guy Pearce and Jessica Chastain. The following year, he portrayed Nicholas Wyatt, a ruthless CEO, in Robert Luketic's Paranoia, along with Harrison Ford and Liam Hemsworth.

=== 2013–present: Awards success ===
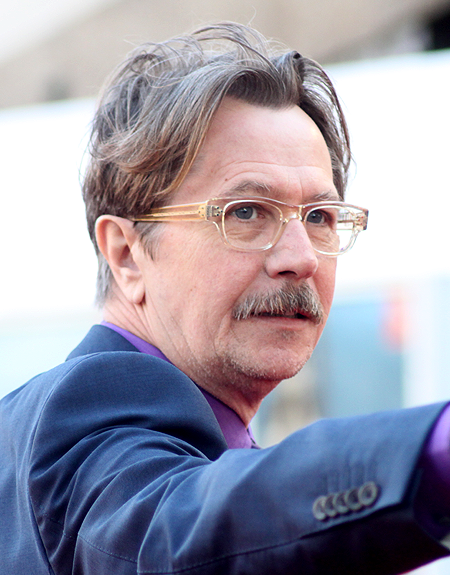
Oldman at the London premiere of Tinker Tailor Soldier Spy in 2011

In 2014 Oldman starred alongside Joel Kinnaman, Abbie Cornish, Michael Keaton and Samuel L. Jackson in the remake of RoboCop, as Norton, the scientist who creates the title character. Also that year, Oldman starred in Dawn of the Planet of the Apes as one of the leads alongside Jason Clarke and Keri Russell. In a promotional interview published in the July/August issue of Playboy magazine, Oldman denounced what he saw as excessive political correctness in American media, alleged discriminating hypocrisy by entertainers who hide "behind comedy and satire to say things we can't ordinarily say", and downplayed the convictions behind offensive slurs said by the actors Alec Baldwin and Mel Gibson, attributing their statements to anger and inebriation, respectively. He went on to say that Gibson—who had faced censure for antisemitic remarks—had "bitten the hand that [feeds]", being in "a town that's run by Jews" (referring to Hollywood). Oldman stressed that he is not "a fascist or a racist", but was nevertheless criticised for his comments. He issued multiple apologies, including on the 25 June edition of the late-night talk show Jimmy Kimmel Live!, where he described the remarks as "offensive, insensitive, pernicious and ill-informed". Both the Anti-Defamation League and the Simon Wiesenthal Center welcomed Oldman's contrition (the latter inviting him to its Museum of Tolerance to screen 2017's Darkest Hour). The director David Fincher told Playboy, "I know him very well... Gary's not cruel. He's an incredibly thoughtful guy."

In 2015 Oldman played the head of police that investigates Tom Hardy's character in Child 44, alongside Noomi Rapace and Joel Kinnaman, and had a supporting role in the post-apocalyptic American thriller Man Down, directed by Dito Montiel, and starring alongside Shia LaBeouf and Kate Mara. In 2016 Oldman played a Central Intelligence Agency chief in Criminal, directed by Ariel Vromen, and starring Kevin Costner, Tommy Lee Jones, Ryan Reynolds, Alice Eve and Gal Gadot.

In 2017 Oldman played three film roles: a billionaire entrepreneur in The Space Between Us, an Eastern European dictator in The Hitman's Bodyguard, and the British prime minister Winston Churchill in Joe Wright's war drama Darkest Hour—his portrayal of Churchill was critically acclaimed. Oldman's transformation into Churchill took 200 hours in the makeup chair, 14 pounds of silicone rubber, and US$20,000 worth of Cuban cigars, which gave him nicotine poisoning. In 2018 he won the Academy Award for Best Actor, Golden Globe Award for Best Actor – Motion Picture Drama, Critics' Choice Movie Award for Best Actor, Screen Actors Guild Award for Best Actor, and BAFTA Award for Best Actor in a Leading Role. His Golden Globe win came despite Oldman having once been a critic of that award; he said that he was "amazed, flattered and very proud" to be nominated.

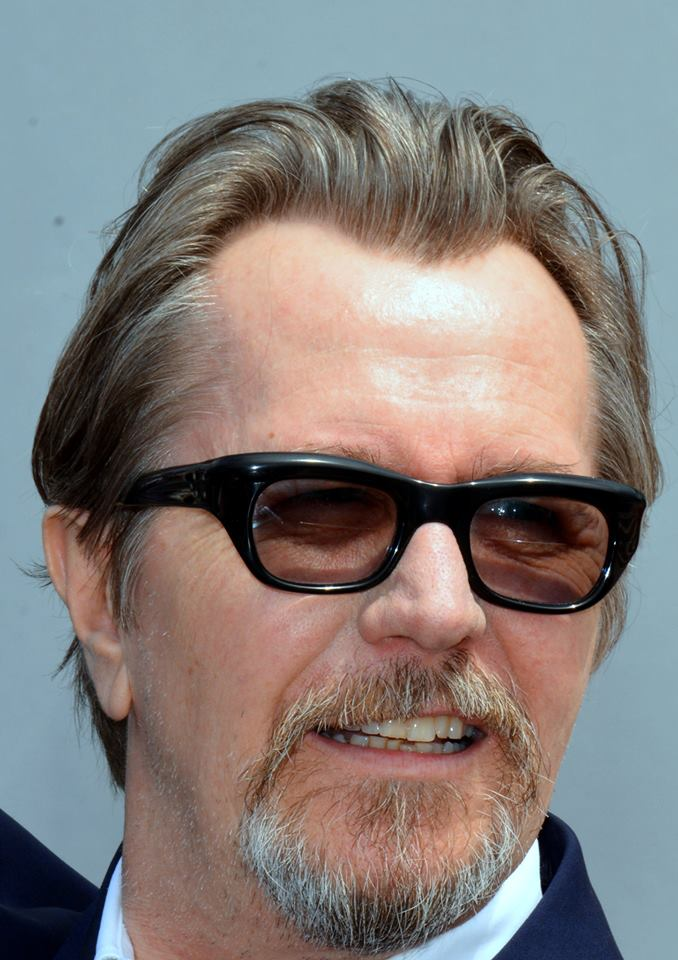
Oldman at the 2018 Cannes Film Festival

In 2018, in his first post-Oscar role, Oldman voiced an evil artificial intelligence in Netflix's independent film Tau and starred in Hunter Killer alongside Gerard Butler. In 2019 Oldman starred in horror-thriller Mary, directed by Michael Goi, and the thriller The Courier, opposite Olga Kurylenko, and appeared in Steven Soderbergh's The Laundromat as Jürgen Mossack, opposite Meryl Streep and Antonio Banderas.

In 2020 Oldman starred as the Citizen Kane co-writer Herman J. Mankiewicz in David Fincher's biographical drama black-and-white Netflix film Mank, which follows Mankiewicz's tumultuous development of the script for Citizen Kane alongside director Orson Welles. The film co-stars Amanda Seyfried, Lily Collins, and Charles Dance. Mank had a limited theatrical release on 13 November, and began streaming on Netflix on 4 December. It received positive reviews, earning 88% on Rotten Tomatoes with the critics' consensus being, "Sharply written and brilliantly performed, Mank peers behind the scenes of Citizen Kane to tell an old Hollywood story that could end up being a classic in its own right." In 2021 Oldman starred opposite Armie Hammer in Crisis and in Joe Wright's The Woman in the Window, alongside Amy Adams.

Oldman was also slated to direct a biopic about Eadweard Muybridge entitled Flying Horse. In 2022, Oldman starred as a cantankerous manager of intelligence agents in the Apple TV+ spy drama television series Slow Horses, based on the book of the same name. Slow Horses marked the first time Oldman played a lead role in a television series. On 20 November 2022, he stated that the series would likely be his last role as he intended to retire from acting once the series ended.

In 2023 he participated in the HBO Max special Harry Potter 20th Anniversary: Return to Hogwarts. That same year he reunited with Christopher Nolan taking a minor role portraying the US president Harry S. Truman in the biographical epic thriller Oppenheimer. The film is based on the Pulitzer Prize-winning biography American Prometheus: The Triumph and Tragedy of J. Robert Oppenheimer and was a critical and financial success. In August 2023 it was confirmed that Oldman would star in Paolo Sorrentino's then-untitled film Parthenope, described as a "love letter to the city of Naples". The film, in which Oldman portrays the writer John Cheever, was selected to compete for the Palme d'Or at the 2024 Cannes Film Festival, where it had its world premiere on 21 May 2024. While it earned a nine-and-a-half-minute standing ovation at the end of its screening, the film received overall negative critical reviews.

== Other work ==
=== Filmmaking ===
In 1997 Oldman directed, produced and wrote the award-winning Nil by Mouth, a film partially based on his recollections of a child he knew in school. Nil by Mouth went on to win the BAFTA Alexander Korda Award for Best British Film (shared with Douglas Urbanski and Luc Besson) and also the BAFTA Award for Best Screenplay, the Channel 4 Director's Award, and an Empire Award. In 1999, it was adjudged by the British Film Institute as one of the hundred best British films of the 20th century. Nil By Mouth was listed by Time Out as number twenty-one of the top 100 best British films.

Oldman and producing partner Douglas Urbanski formed the SE8 GROUP to produce Nil by Mouth. The company also produced The Contender, which also starred Oldman. He completed a screenplay, Chang & Eng, co-written with Darin Strauss, based on the author's book of the same name. In September 2006, Nokia Nseries Studio released the Oldman-directed short film Donut, with music by Tor Hyams. The film was shot with an N93 to promote the phone. Juliet Landau made a 25-minute documentary about the making of the video. In 2011, he directed a music video for then-wife Alex Eden's first single, "Kiss Me Like the Woman You Loved".

=== Music ===
Oldman has had a keen interest in music from an early age. He is a proficient pianist and stated in a 1995 interview with Charlie Rose that he would rather be a musician than an actor. Oldman sang several tracks on the Sid and Nancy soundtrack, on which he performed alongside the original Sex Pistols bassist Glen Matlock, and sang and played live piano in the 1988 film Track 29. He traced over Beethoven compositions in 1994's Immortal Beloved, and tutored the Harry Potter actor Daniel Radcliffe on bass guitar. Oldman appeared on Reeves Gabrels's album The Sacred Squall of Now, performing a vocal duet with David Bowie on the track "You've Been Around". He produced a live performance by the former White Stripes member Jack White in conjunction with Vevo and YouTube. At the 2016 Brit Awards in London, Oldman paid tribute to Bowie, before receiving the Brits "Icon Award" on behalf of the singer and his family.

=== Voice acting ===
Oldman participated in the creation of The Legend of Spyro games, produced by Sierra Entertainment. He provided the voice of the Fire Guardian, Ignitus. He voices Sergeant Viktor Reznov and scientist Daniel Clarke in the Call of Duty games. He also provides the narration of Sergeant Jack Barnes in the Spearhead expansion for Medal of Honor: Allied Assault. In 2015 he voiced Lord Vortech, the evil mastermind who seeks to control the LEGO Multiverse, in the Lego Dimensions video game. He will play Admiral Ernst Bishop in the upcoming single-player campaign of the Chris Roberts-designed crowdfunded video game, Squadron 42.

=== Writing ===
In 2015 Oldman and his manager Douglas Urbanski signed a deal with the Simon & Schuster/Atria Publishing Group label Emily Bestler Books for Blood Riders, a vampire book series.

== Acting style ==
Oldman studied the teachings of Konstantin Stanislavski and Stella Adler while at drama school but went "off-book", drawing much of his inspiration from American cinema. As a screen actor, Oldman was almost typecast as an anti-social personality early in his career. The necessity to express villainous characters in an overtly physical manner led to the cultivation of a "big" acting style that incorporated projection skills acquired during his stage training. He further sought to develop a distinctive approach that would distance him from his "stuffy" and "often interchangeable" British peers.

Oldman has conceded that his performances often involve an element of overacting: "It's my influence on those roles that probably [makes them] feel bigger than life and a little over-the-top. I mean, I do go for it a bit as an actor, I must admit." In another interview, he stated, "If it's coming from a sincere place, then I think the screen can hold the epic and it can hold the very, very small." Stuart Heritage of The Guardian wrote, "Finding the definitive Gary Oldman ham performance is like trying to choose which of your children you prefer. The man is a long-term devotee of the art of ham." Conversely, Oldman noted that he enjoys "playing characters where the silence is loud" such as George Smiley in Tinker Tailor Soldier Spy (2011).

Oldman has adopted various accents for roles and portrayed a wide range of characters. He is known for his in-depth research of his roles, as well as his devotion to them, at one point being hospitalised after losing significant weight for Sid and Nancy, and another time had to hire a dialect coach to relearn his English accent after nearly adopting an "American twang" due to his children being raised American. In a 2017 interview, he differentiated between immersion and impression:

I have a relatively good ear and can do a few impressions of people. I don't study them, but I think what happens with an impressionist is that they're looking at one particular source. Impressionists have to paint with a very broad stroke because you've got to see it within a couple of seconds. As an actor, though, you look at different aspects of a character. I try to completely surround myself with the assignment. It's like being in a big cloud and then some of it rains through—for instance, looking at not only [Winston] Churchill's way of walking and mannerisms and the way he sounds, but also looking into the psychology.

== Reception and legacy ==
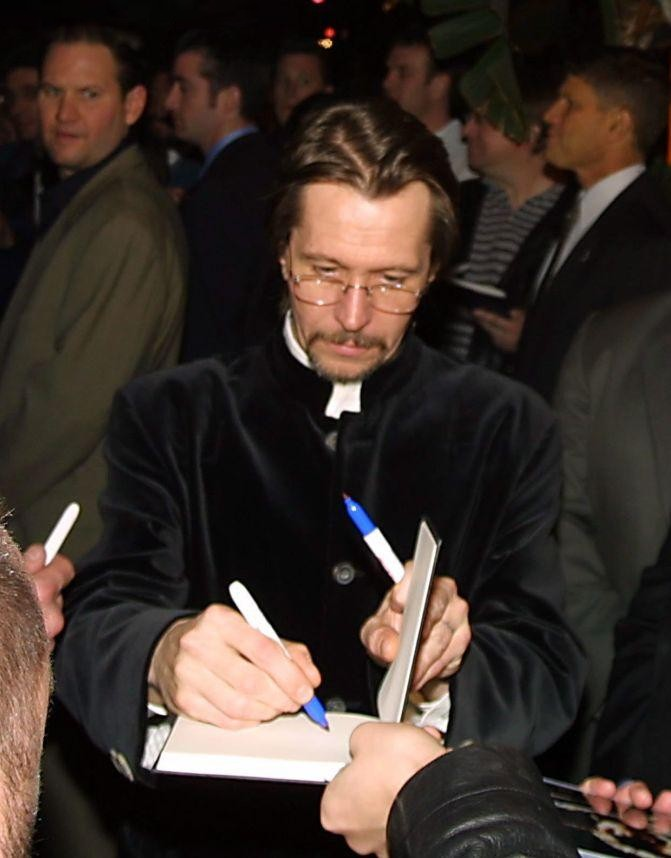
Oldman signing autographs for fans in 2007

Oldman has established a cult following among film fans. He is known for playing the primary antagonist in a number of popular motion pictures, which has seen him referenced in popular culture. At the peak of his popularity in the 1990s, Oldman was dubbed by Empire magazine Hollywood's "psycho deluxe", and was spoofed on popular television shows such as the Fox comedy series In Living Color and MTV's Celebrity Deathmatch, as well as drafted in to appear on the first ever cover of Loaded magazine. In 1993 he appeared in the music video for Annie Lennox's international hit "Love Song for a Vampire", written for the soundtrack to Bram Stoker's Dracula, and had a cameo role as the Devil in the video for Guns N' Roses single "Since I Don't Have You"—Oldman also played the Devil in the 2002 BMW short Beat The Devil, alongside Clive Owen, James Brown and Marilyn Manson. He starred as a sleazy priest in the controversial religious-themed video for David Bowie's 2013 single "The Next Day". In contrast to his often dark on-screen roles, Oldman's affable real-life demeanour has been noted, and he was named as one of Empire's "100 Sexiest Stars in Film History" in 2007. In 2011 readers of Empire voted him the recipient of the Empire Icon Award, which was presented by Colin Firth.

Washington Post and Independent writers noted that Oldman is regarded as one of the greatest actors of his generation. In 2012 The Globe and Mail journalist Lynn Crosbie wrote, "Critics never fail to single Oldman out... he is one of a few truly great living actors—arguably, even, the best". Of his diversity, Yahoo! Movies noted that he had "gained a well-earned reputation as a brilliant chameleon"; the Houston Chronicle dubbed Oldman "the face of versatility". He is noted for his avoidance of the Hollywood celebrity scene, often being referred to as an "actor's actor". His work has been acclaimed by Hollywood figures: Tom Hardy has described Oldman as his "absolute complete and utter hero" and "hands down, the greatest actor that's ever lived"; Brad Pitt, Daniel Radcliffe and Ryan Gosling have also cited Oldman as their favourite actor. Hardy recalled Oldman's influence on students at drama school, stating that "everybody used to quote him in all of his films". Jessica Chastain, Jennifer Lawrence, Joseph Gordon-Levitt, Tom Hiddleston and Chris Pine have also named Oldman as one of their favourite actors.

Christian Bale, Hugh Jackman, Benedict Cumberbatch, Shia LaBeouf, Ben Mendelsohn, Johnny Depp, Jason Isaacs and Michael Fassbender have cited Oldman as an influence; Bale called him "the reason I'm acting". Anthony Hopkins, Ralph Fiennes, Keanu Reeves and Ray Winstone have used the term "genius" in reference to Oldman. John Hurt called him "the best of the bunch"; Colin Firth hailed him as "a very strong candidate for the world's best living actor" and a "hero" of his; and Alec Baldwin described him as "preternaturally gifted" and "the greatest film actor of his generation". Kristin Scott Thomas referred to Oldman as "the most amazing, generous actor". Christopher Eccleston hailed Oldman's Academy Award win for Darkest Hour as "massive" to people from working-class backgrounds. He remarked, "Oldman is as fine an actor as Daniel Day-Lewis, but Gary is not double-barrelled." The directors Luc Besson, Tony Scott and Christopher Nolan, with whom Oldman has worked, have lauded his work; Besson in 1997 called him "one of the top five actors in the world", while Scott labelled him a "genius". David Cronenberg said that Oldman "really is a fabulous actor" who gave "the best version" of Jim Gordon (in Nolan's Dark Knight trilogy).

Film critics have also been vocal in their appreciation of Oldman. Roger Ebert hailed him as "one of the great actors, able to play high, low, crass, noble"; while Gene Siskel called him "wonderful" and one of his favourite actors. Peter Travers described Oldman as "one of the best actors on the planet". Prior to his first Academy Award nomination for Tinker Tailor Soldier Spy, Oldman was regarded as one of the greatest actors never nominated for the award; In 2009 Leigh Singer of The Guardian called him "arguably the best actor never Oscar-nominated." Before winning for Darkest Hour, he also carried the label of the greatest actor never to win an Oscar. In 2018 Stuart McGurk of GQ described Oldman as "the master of being brilliant in bad movies".

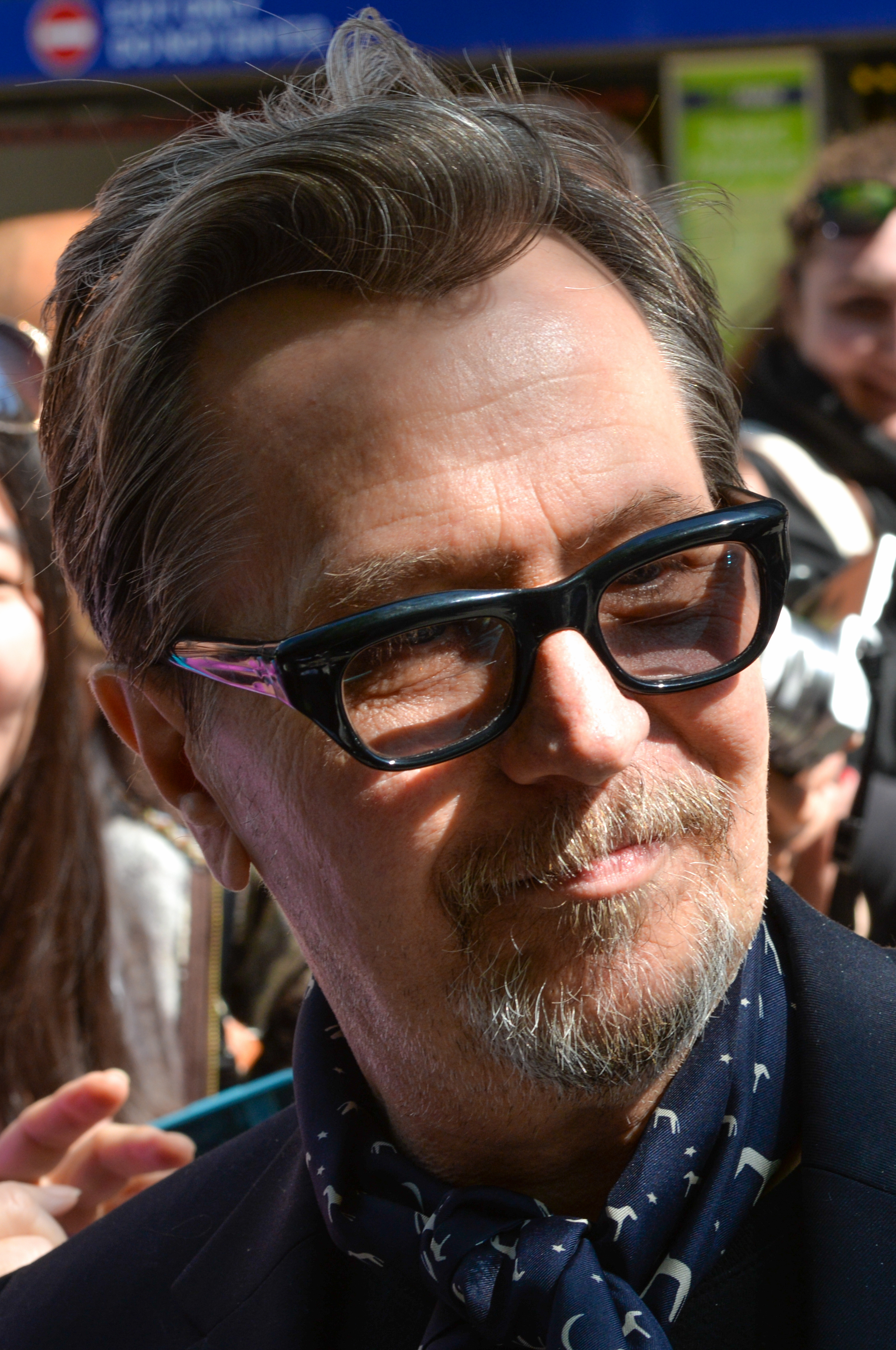
Oldman at the 2017 Toronto International Film Festival

In 1998 Oldman was honoured at the Camerimage Film Festival, where he was awarded the Krzysztof Kieślowski Award for Acting, the first recipient of the award. In 2011 Oldman received a Tribute Award from the Gotham Awards. In that same year, the Palm Springs International Film Festival announced that Oldman would be receiving its International Star Award, which honours "an actor or actress who has achieved both critical and commercial international recognition throughout their body of work". The PSIFF chairman called Oldman "a performer whose ability to portray the most extreme of characters is a testament to the enormity of his talent". In 2012 The Hollywood Reporter named Oldman the highest-grossing actor in history, based on lead and supporting roles. Films in which he has appeared have grossed over $4.1 billion in the United States, and over $11 billion worldwide.

In 2012 Oldman was among the British cultural icons selected by the artist Sir Peter Blake to appear in a new version of his most famous artwork—the Beatles' Sgt. Pepper's Lonely Hearts Club Band album cover—to celebrate the British cultural figures of his life that he most admires to mark his 80th birthday. In 2014 he received the Dilys Powell Award For Excellence in Film by the London Film Critics.

In 2018 Oldman received the Variety Award at the British Independent Film Awards, which recognises a director, actor, writer or producer who has made a global impact and helped to focus the international spotlight on the UK Variety's vice-president, Steven Gaydos, remarked that Oldman "has blazed a path as one of international cinema's most versatile and valued actors." In the same year, the Santa Barbara International Film Festival awarded Oldman the Maltin Modern Master Award, the highest accolade awarded by SPIFF that honours an individual who has enriched our culture through accomplishments in the motion picture industry. Leonard Maltin claimed Oldman has "once again proven that he is a force to be reckoned with, and a true master of his craft". Oldman was also awarded his first Career Achievement Award by the Hollywood Film Awards. The Make-up Artists and Hair Stylists Guild Awards as well honoured him with the Distinguished Artisan Award, which IATSE President Susan Cabral-Ebert proclaimed him as "a chameleon, an actor who changes his appearance, his voice, everything about himself from film to film".

== Acting credits, accolades and honours ==
Throughout his career, Oldman has received numerous accolades including an Academy Award, an Actor Award, three BAFTAs, two Critics' Choice Movie Awards, a Golden Globe Award, as well as nominations for two Primetime Emmy Awards, and two Independent Spirit Awards.

Over his career he has been recognised by the Academy of Motion Picture Arts and Sciences for the following performances:

- 84th Academy Awards: Best Actor in a Leading Role, nomination for George Smiley in Tinker Tailor Soldier Spy (2011)
- 90th Academy Awards: Best Actor in a Leading Role, win for Winston Churchill in Darkest Hour (2017)
- 93rd Academy Awards: Best Actor in a Leading Role, nomination for Herman J. Mankiewicz in Mank (2020)

Oldman was knighted by Charles III "for services to drama" in the 2025 Birthday Honours.

On 22 August 2025, Oldman was honored with a handprint and footprint ceremony at the TCL Chinese Theatre in Hollywood.

== Personal life ==
After establishing himself as an actor, Oldman moved to Los Angeles in the United States in the early 1990s. He does not employ a publicist and does not go to parties, telling an interviewer in 2007 that he has "dinner at home every night with my kids." In 2014 he described himself as a libertarian.

Oldman's alcoholism was well known during the early 1990s; he was arrested for drink-driving in 1991 and checked himself into rehabilitation in 1994. In subsequent interviews, he acknowledged his problems with alcohol and called himself a recovering alcoholic in a 2001 interview with Charlie Rose. He has been sober since 1997 and attributes his success in beating his addiction to attending meetings with Alcoholics Anonymous, which he has publicly praised.

=== Marriages and family ===
Oldman has been married five times. He wed the English actress Lesley Manville in 1987, and their son, Alfie, was born the following year. They separated in 1989, three months after Alfie's birth, and divorced a year later. Manville stated in 2018 that she and Oldman are on good terms, saying, "He's got a new wife, and we all get on... Gary and I are friends." They have two grandchildren, Matilda and Ozzy Oldman, through Alfie.

Oldman married the American actress Uma Thurman in 1990; they divorced in 1992.

From 1994 to 1996 Oldman was engaged to the Italian actress and model Isabella Rossellini, his co-star in Immortal Beloved; they never wed.

In 1997 Oldman married the American model Donya Fiorentino (sister of the actress Linda Fiorentino), with whom he had two sons: Gulliver (b. 1997) and Charlie (b. 1999). In 2001 Fiorentino filed for divorce, claiming that Oldman had hit her in the face with a telephone receiver while choking her. Oldman was investigated and cleared, receiving sole legal and physical child custody; Fiorentino was granted limited, state-supervised contact dependent on her passing drug and alcohol tests. In 2003 a judge reduced her access to the children after dismissing claims that Oldman had drugged and physically abused them. In 2018 Gulliver, who Fiorentino claimed had witnessed the alleged 2001 assault, lamented the "pain and hardship" caused by his mother's "lies" over the years, while specifically condemning the media's "disgusting" perpetuation of the assault allegation.

On 31 December 2008, Oldman married Alexandra Edenborough, an English singer and actress who was temporarily known as Alex E., in Santa Barbara, California, US. Edenborough filed for divorce on 9 January 2015; the divorce was finalised in September 2015.

In August 2017 Oldman married Gisele Schmidt, a writer and art curator, in a private ceremony at the home of his manager, Douglas Urbanski. As of 2021, Oldman and Schmidt live in Palm Springs, California.

== See also ==
- List of Academy Award winners and nominees from Great Britain
- List of oldest and youngest Academy Award winners and nominees — Oldest winners for Best Lead Actor
