= Nil by Mouth (film) =

1997 film by Gary Oldman

- Theatrical release poster
- Directed by: Gary Oldman
- Written by: Gary Oldman
- Produced by: Gary Oldman; Douglas Urbanski; Luc Besson
- Starring: Kathy Burke; Charlie Creed-Miles; Laila Morse; Ray Winstone; Chrissie Cotterill; Jamie Foreman; Jon Morrison; Steve Sweeney
- Cinematography: Ron Fortunato
- Edited by: Brad Fuller
- Music by: Eric Clapton
- Production companies: EuropaCorp; SE8 GROUP
- Distributed by: Fox Searchlight Pictures (through 20th Century Fox, United Kingdom and Ireland); ARP Sélection (France)
- Release dates: 8 May 1997 (Cannes); 10 October 1997 (UK); 5 November 1997 (France)
- Running time: 128 minutes
- Countries: United Kingdom; France
- Language: English
- Budget: $9 million
- Box office: $266,130 (US only)

Nil by Mouth is a 1997 drama film written, produced and directed by Gary Oldman in his debut as a filmmaker. It portrays the life of a dysfunctional working-class family in South East London, partly inspired by Oldman's upbringing. It stars Ray Winstone, Kathy Burke, Charlie Creed-Miles, Laila Morse and Edna Doré. The score was composed by Eric Clapton.

Nil by Mouth was co-produced by Luc Besson's company EuropaCorp and distributed in the United Kingdom by 20th Century Fox under Fox Searchlight Pictures. It premiered at the 1997 Cannes Film Festival, where Kathy Burke won the Best Actress Award.

Nil by Mouth was nominated for four BAFTA Awards and won Best British Film and Best Original Screenplay. In 1999, the British Film Institute included it in its list of the Top 100 British films. In 2017, a poll of 150 actors, directors, writers, producers, and critics for Time Out ranked it the 21st-best British film.

== Plot ==
In a working-class part of South East London live Raymond; his wife, Valerie; little daughter Michelle; brother-in-law, Billy; mother-in-law, Janet; and grandmother-in-law, Kathy. Billy is a drug addict. He hangs out with his heroin-addict friends and they shoot up together. The family is dysfunctional, mostly because of Raymond's fiery temper and violent outbursts. When Valerie gets pregnant again, she continues to smoke and drink. One night, they score drugs and Billy uses Ray's cocaine. Ray is livid and bites Billy's nose and throws him out of the flat. Billy breaks back in and steals a family heirloom to pay for his drug habit.

Valerie goes out on the town, and when Ray sees an attractive male friend of hers, he flies into a jealous rage, ordering her out of the pub and into the car. Back home, he accuses her of sleeping with the male friend, and brutalizes her severely, causing her to miscarry. He tries to win her back, but she leaves him and prepares to start a new life without him. In an alcohol-fuelled rage, he angrily tears their flat apart. He tells Mark, his friend, that the reason for his horrible behaviour is his own abusive father, who was the same way with him and his mother.

Later, he tries to reconcile with Valerie, but she is outraged, and says that when she reaches 70, she wants to look back on this part of her life, as she is now 30, as a time when she had some fun. What she has, instead, is people feeling sorry for her. Valerie does not want to return to Ray, pointing out they have not got a home to go back to because he has smashed it all up. She will try to find someone to be with who will love her and treat her kindly.

Ray and Valerie are eventually back together again, and Ray has fixed up the flat. Ray speaks as crudely as ever, but seems to be restraining himself from his usual angry outbursts. Billy and his friend Danny rob a man to support their drug habit, and wind up going to prison. This not only reunites Ray with Valerie, but also reunites the whole family. They all go off to visit Billy.

== Cast ==
- Ray Winstone as Raymond ("Ray")
- Kathy Burke as Valerie ("Val")
- Charlie Creed-Miles as Billy
- Laila Morse as Janet
- Edna Doré as Kath
- Chrissie Cotterill as Paula
- Jon Morrison as Angus
- Jamie Foreman as Mark
- Steve Sweeney as Danny

== Production ==
This was EuropaCorp's first official production. The film depicts the environment Oldman witnessed growing up on a council estate in South East London. Oldman's sister Laila Morse plays Janet and his mother voices a song in the film. The title is a UK medical instruction (literally "nothing by mouth"), meaning that a patient must not take food or water. The score was composed by Eric Clapton.

The film features the word "cunt" 82 times, more than any other film in history. It also features 428 uses of the word "fuck" and its derivatives, more than any film at the time until Summer of Sam surpassed it two years later, but it remains the highest-ranked (as of 2019) with regard to the average number of utterances per minute of running time, with 3.34 / min (leaving aside Swearnet: The Movie, which is more of a concept movie revolving around that very theme, and Fuck, a documentary about the word in question).

== Reception ==
The film received generally positive reviews. On the review aggregator website Rotten Tomatoes, 79% of 33 critics' reviews are positive, with an average rating of 7/10. The website's consensus reads: "Foul-mouthed and unrelentingly bleak, Nil by Mouth is a prickly viewing experience that nevertheless impresses with its authentic blue collar angst and ferocious performances." Metacritic, which uses a weighted average, assigned the film a score of 76 out of 100, based on 20 critics, indicating "generally favorable" reviews.

Roger Ebert awarded Nil by Mouth 3.5 out of 4, writing: "The film's portrait of street life in South London is unflinching and observant." Reviewing the film for its 25th anniversary, the Guardian critic Peter Bradshaw gave it five out of five, praising its performances and "pure invention, energy and seriousness". It grossed £142,200 ($230,364) from 61 screens in its opening weekend in the United Kingdom, placing 10th at the UK box office. It grossed a total of $266,130 from 18 theatres in the United States and Canada.

=== Awards and nominations ===
Institution	Year	Category	Nominee	Result
British Academy Film Awards	1998	Best British Film	Luc Besson, Gary Oldman, Douglas Urbanski	Won
British Academy Film Awards	1998	Best Original Screenplay	Gary Oldman	Won
British Academy Film Awards	1998	Best Actor in a Leading Role	Ray Winstone	Nominated
British Academy Film Awards	1998	Best Actress in a Leading Role	Kathy Burke	Nominated
British Independent Film Awards	1998	Best British Independent Film	Gary Oldman	Nominated
British Independent Film Awards	1998	Best Director	Gary Oldman	Nominated
British Independent Film Awards	1998	Best Actor	Ray Winstone	Won
British Independent Film Awards	1998	Best Actress	Kathy Burke	Won
British Independent Film Awards	1998	Best Screenplay	Gary Oldman	Nominated
British Independent Film Awards	1998	Most Promising Newcomer in any Category	Laila Morse	Won
Cannes Film Festival	1997	Palme d'Or	—N/a	Nominated
Cannes Film Festival	1997	Best Actress	Kathy Burke	Won
Camerimage	1997	Golden Frog	Ron Fortunato	Nominated
Edinburgh International Film Festival	1997	Channel 4 Director's Award	Gary Oldman	Won
Empire Awards	1998	Best Debut	Gary Oldman	Won
European Film Awards	1997	Best Cinematographer	Ron Fortunato	Nominated
Royal Variety Club of Great Britain	1997	Best Film Actress	Kathy Burke	Won

=== Best-of lists ===
In 1999, the British Film Institute included Nil by Mouth in its list of the Top 100 British films. In 2017, a poll of 150 actors, directors, writers, producers, and critics for Time Out ranked it the 21st-best British film.

== See also ==
- BFI Top 100 British films
