= The One with Monica and Chandler's Wedding =

- Friends episodes
- Episode nos.: Season 7 Episodes 23, 24
- Directed by: Kevin S. Bright
- Written by: Gregory S. Malins (part 1); Marta Kauffman & David Crane (part 2)
- Production codes: 226422 (part 1); 226423 (part 2)
- Original air date: May 17, 2001

Guest appearances
- Gary Oldman as Richard Crosby; Kathleen Turner as Helena Handbasket/Charles Bing; Elliott Gould as Jack Geller; Morgan Fairchild as Nora Tyler Bing; James Michael Tyler as Gunther; Steve Susskind as Father Karambetsos; Mark Roberts as the director; Christina Pickles as Judy Geller

Episode chronology
← Previous "The One with Chandler's Dad"	Next → "The One After 'I Do'"
- Friends season 7

"The One with Monica and Chandler's Wedding" is a double length episode of the television sitcom Friends. It first aired on May 17, 2001 as the finale of season seven. It is usually broadcast in a one-hour slot and presented on DVD as one complete episode, but when the episodes are split the two parts are differentiated by the suffixes Part 1 and Part 2. For his guest appearance, Gary Oldman was nominated for the Primetime Emmy Award for Outstanding Guest Actor in a Comedy Series.

== Plot ==
=== Part 1 ===
In the opening scene, after the others leave Central Perk for lunch with Monica and Ross's mother, Ross gives Chandler his "older brother" talk: if Chandler ever hurts Monica or ever causes her any unhappiness of any kind, Ross will hunt him down and beat him up. Chandler finds this funny and struggles to contain his laughter at this.

Joey has started shooting a World War I movie with Richard Crosby (Gary Oldman) who keeps spitting at Joey while saying his lines. An annoyed Joey confronts Richard, who tells him that all good actors spit while enunciating their lines. Therefore, when they shoot the next scene, Joey and Richard both constantly spit at each other while saying their lines. When their scenes are over for the day, Joey is given lines for scenes for the next day, which unfortunately conflicts with him performing Monica and Chandler's wedding that day.

Back at Monica's apartment, Chandler and Monica are going to their wedding rehearsal. Chandler listens to the answering machine after Monica leaves and begins to freak out when he realizes they are becoming "The Bings". At the rehearsal, things are going smoothly until Chandler's parents come and things go crazy. When Chandler's mom, Nora Tyler-Bing (Morgan Fairchild), is introduced to Monica's parents, Jack and Judy Geller, Jack embarrasses himself by mistaking her for Chandler's dad. Chandler's mom and Chandler's dad, Charles Bing (Kathleen Turner), keep having arguments, and Ross bemuses everyone else by talking about his "big brother" talk with Chandler, causing others to laugh, to Ross's annoyance, except for Jack and Judy.

After the dinner, Ross goes to Joey's apartment looking for Chandler who is staying the night since the groom cannot see the bride before the wedding, but finds an empty room and a note from Chandler. Ross immediately goes across the hall to Monica's apartment and shows Rachel and Phoebe the note Chandler left simply saying to tell Monica he is sorry. Understanding that Chandler has truly left and trying to figure out what to do, Ross goes out to search for Chandler while Rachel and Phoebe make sure Monica does not find out.

The next morning, Monica is so excited and thrilled about her wedding day that starts getting ready, not realizing that Chandler is still missing. Seeing this, Rachel starts to panic and begins to cry. Phoebe takes her to the bathroom to prevent Monica from seeing her in this state otherwise she will know something is wrong. When they are in there, Phoebe finds a positive pregnancy test in the garbage and deduces that Monica is pregnant.

=== Part 2 ===
Ross tells Rachel to stall Monica so he can have more time to search for Chandler and Phoebe helps him search. When Monica comes back out of her room to begin getting ready for the wedding, Rachel distracts her by moping about her own unlikelihood of getting married.

Meanwhile, Ross and Phoebe find a confused Chandler in his office. He tells them he loves Monica so much, and he does not want to hurt her, but he is afraid that becoming "The Bings" will spell marital misery, maybe as bad as his parents. Ross convinces Chandler to go back to the apartment and begin getting ready, doing one thing at a time, not thinking about the goal. In Monica's apartment, Rachel tries other less believable tactics to distract Monica and she realizes that something is going on. Rachel decides to tell Monica, but Phoebe opens the door and gives a thumbs-up sign to Rachel, controlling the situation.

At the studios, Joey pleads with the director to leave early for the wedding, but is informed he cannot change his schedule, but is promised that only a short scene needs to be done that day. However, after Joey meets Richard and sees that he is too drunk and can barely stay focused; he is stuck redoing the scene over and over. At the hotel, everything is ready for the wedding when Joey calls Rachel to warn her that he will be late. Meanwhile, Ross is keeping an eye on Chandler since he still has cold feet. Chandler steps out to sneak a cigarette when he suddenly hears Phoebe and Rachel coming, so he ducks into a storeroom to hide. He overhears that Monica is pregnant and flees again.

Rachel finds another wedding finishing up in the same hotel and convinces the minister to officiate the wedding in case Joey does not arrive in time. Meanwhile, Joey again pleads to leave the studio early for the wedding, but the director makes it very clear to Joey that he cannot leave until the scene is finished or as long as Richard is on set and conscious. Upon greeting Richard at his dressing room, he convinces him that they have completed all of their scenes and carries him home.

Ross and Phoebe find Chandler again and Ross rapidly tackles him to the ground urging him not to hurt Monica. Chandler admits that he was indeed running away until he found a small baby outfit in the hotel's gift store and began to come around to the idea of fatherhood. He then goes with Phoebe and Ross to the wedding.

As the ceremony begins, Joey finally arrives and takes his place between Monica and Chandler, accidentally letting slip that Chandler had second thoughts about the wedding. Monica delivers her self-written vow, while Chandler delivers one from the heart – both speeches are very moving. When the ceremony is over, Chandler tells Monica that he knows about her being pregnant and how Phoebe found a pregnancy test in the trash, but she reveals she did not take a pregnancy test; to which he wonders who did. Phoebe exclaims to Rachel how Chandler and Monica are now married and having a baby, and the camera zooms in on Rachel as she manages a weak "uh-huh" with a slightly panicked look on her face, thus revealing that she is the one who is pregnant.

== Production ==
The show was filmed over two weeks, with all of the scenes featuring Gary Oldman being filmed in the first week. The wedding was filmed in the second week, with the final shot of Rachel filmed after the studio audience had left.

== Reception ==
The first part has a 9.1 rating at TV.com with the second having a slightly higher 9.3. Gary Oldman received a Primetime Emmy Award nomination for Outstanding Guest Actor in a Comedy Series for his portrayal of Richard Crosby.
