= Prick Up Your Ears =

- UK release poster
- Directed by: Stephen Frears
- Screenplay by: Alan Bennett
- Based on: Prick Up Your Ears by John Lahr
- Produced by: Andrew Brown
- Starring: Gary Oldman; Alfred Molina; Vanessa Redgrave
- Cinematography: Oliver Stapleton
- Music by: Stanley Myers
- Production companies: Civilhand; Zenith Entertainment
- Distributed by: Curzon Film Distributors
- Release date: 17 April 1987
- Running time: 111 minutes
- Country: United Kingdom
- Language: English
- Budget: £1.9 million
- Box office: $1.6 million

Prick Up Your Ears is a 1987 British film, directed by Stephen Frears, about the playwright Joe Orton and his lover Kenneth Halliwell. The screenplay was written by Alan Bennett, based on the 1978 biography by John Lahr. The film stars Gary Oldman as Orton, Alfred Molina as Halliwell, Wallace Shawn as Lahr, and Vanessa Redgrave as Peggy Ramsay.

== Plot ==
Islington, 9 August 1967. Literary agent Peggy Ramsay knocks on the door of playwright Joe Orton and his lover Kenneth Halliwell, but nobody opens. She calls the police. They find the corpses of the two men. A decade later theatre critic John Lahr visits Peggy Ramsay because he wants to write Orton's biography. They find Orton's diaries, and Peggy tells Lahr about Orton's life.

Orton and Halliwell's relationship began at the Royal Academy of Dramatic Arts. Orton started out as the uneducated youth to Halliwell's older faux-sophisticate. As the relationship progressed, however, Orton grew increasingly confident in his talent while Halliwell's writing stagnated. They fell into a parody of a traditional married couple, with Orton as the "husband" and Halliwell as the long-suffering and increasingly-ignored "wife" (a situation exacerbated at a time when being a sexually active homosexual was illegal). Orton was commissioned to write a screenplay for the Beatles. Halliwell got carried away in preparing for a meeting with the "Fab Four", but Orton was taken away for a meeting on his own. Finally, in August 1967, a despondent Halliwell kills Orton and commits suicide.

== Cast ==
- Gary Oldman as Joe Orton
- Alfred Molina as Kenneth Halliwell
- Vanessa Redgrave as Peggy Ramsay
- Frances Barber as Leonie Orton
- Janet Dale as Mrs Sugden
- Lindsay Duncan as Anthea Lahr
- Bert Parnaby as The Magistrate
- Margaret Tyzack as Madame Lambert
- Julie Walters as Elsie Orton
- Wallace Shawn as John Lahr
- Joan Sanderson as Anthea's Mother
- Richard Wilson as Psychiatrist
- John Moffatt as Wigmaker

=== Casting ===
Ian McKellen was originally envisioned as Halliwell. McKellen explained: "I needed a holiday – I'd been working so hard – so I just kept saying 'no, no, no', but when I saw the film I really regretted not having done it." Maggie Smith turned down the role of Ramsay, saying that she did not want to perturb her sons by starring in a film that featured homosexual promiscuity and murder. Keith Allen was in talks to play Orton before Oldman was cast. In an edition of his podcast in 2026, Alexei Sayle claimed that Frears considered casting him as Halliwell opposite Allen.

== Reception ==
Prick Up Your Ears has a 92% rating at review aggregator Rotten Tomatoes, based on 39 reviews, with an average score of 7.7/10. Metacritic, which uses a weighted average, assigned the film a score of 72 out of 100, based on 17 critics, indicating "generally favorable" reviews.

Roger Ebert awarded Prick Up Your Ears four stars out of four, describing Redgrave's performance as "superb", and praising the work of Oldman and Molina: "The great performances in the movie are, of course, at its center. Gary Oldman plays Orton, and Alfred Molina plays Halliwell, and these are two of the best performances of the year... [Oldman] is the best young British actor around". Variety noted: "The script is witty, the direction fluid, with one of the homosexual orgy scenes in a public toilet almost balletic, and the depiction of the lovers' life in their flat suitably claustrophobic."

Vincent Canby was less enthused, writing: "The film covers the main events of the Orton life in a manner that is nothing less than distracted. One has little understanding of the fatal intensity – and need – that kept Orton and Halliwell together." He nevertheless had praise for the film's acting. Similarly, Pauline Kael lauded Redgrave but said the male relationship was unconvincing and suffused with "modern-style psychosexual moralizing", and that "unlike Orton, it [the script] takes no real delight in misbehaving."

Oldman earned a BAFTA Award nomination for Best Actor; Redgrave received BAFTA and Golden Globe Award nominations for Best Actress in a Supporting Role. Redgrave won Best Supporting Actress at the New York Film Critics Circle Awards. Alan Bennett earned a BAFTA Award nomination for Best Adapted Screenplay. The film was also nominated for Best Foreign Film at the 1987 Independent Spirit Awards and won the award for Best Artistic Contribution at that year's Cannes Film Festival.
