= List of Speechless episodes =

Episodes of the 2016–2019 American television sitcom Speechless

Speechless is an American television sitcom that debuted on September 21, 2016, on ABC. On September 29, 2016, ABC ordered a full season of 22 episodes. On December 13, 2016, an additional episode was added bringing the season to a total of 23 episodes. On May 12, 2017, ABC renewed the series for a second season, which premiered on September 27, 2017. On May 11, 2018, ABC renewed the series for a third season. The series finale aired on April 12, 2019.

During the course of the series, 63 episodes of Speechless aired over three seasons, between September 21, 2016, and April 12, 2019.

On May 10, 2019, ABC cancelled the series after three seasons.

== Series overview ==
Season	Episodes	Originally released	
Season	Episodes	First released	Last released
1	23	September 21, 2016	May 17, 2017
2	18	September 27, 2017	March 21, 2018
3	22	October 5, 2018	April 12, 2019

== Episodes ==
=== Season 1 (2016–17) ===
No. overall	No. in season	Title	Directed by	Written by	Original release date	Prod. code	US viewers (millions)
1	1	"P-i-Pilot"	Christine Gernon	Scott Silveri	September 21, 2016	1AZJ01	7.38
The DiMeo family moves into a rundown house in a better neighborhood than the one they left, meaning a new school for the kids. Maya DiMeo is forceful in her efforts to get the school to provide everything that JJ, her disabled son, requires. Her attitude rubs many school staff members the wrong way, among them Principal Miller and groundskeeper Kenneth, the latter to whom JJ takes a liking. Meanwhile, Ray wants to rebel against having to go to yet another new school until he sees the school has a planetarium and meets a fellow astronomy buff named Jillian.
2	2	"N-e-New A-i-Aide"	Christine Gernon	Scott Silveri	September 28, 2016	1AZJ02	6.43
Maya reluctantly hires Kenneth to be JJ's aide, but wants to fire him when he helps JJ meet the cheerleading squad and JJ ignores her phone calls about his physical therapy appointment. Maya later sees Kenneth helping JJ in the bathroom and decides to keep him on. Elsewhere, Ray continues to pursue Jillian even after learning that she has a boyfriend, while Jimmy makes a bad impression with the new neighbors.
3	3	"B-o-n-Bonfire"	Bill Purple	Danny Chun	October 5, 2016	1AZJ03	6.03
As the football team prepares to face a rival school, they invite JJ to their annual pre-game bonfire. But, with the bonfire taking place on a beach down a rocky hillside, Maya realizes JJ cannot get to it and forces the school to cancel the event. JJ becomes angry with Maya because he doesn't want to be the reason for spoiling the other students' fun. At home, Ray wants to show Jillian his model Jupiter Probe, but is embarrassed to invite her into the house, which is filled with junk the family has culled from other people's garbage. Jimmy tries to rectify the situation and get rid of the trash but, on the way to throwing it out, he and Ray can't help falling back into old habits. Meanwhile, a conversation with Kenneth makes Dylan question why she likes to run.
4	4	"I-n-s-Inspirations"	Christine Gernon	Seth Kurland	October 12, 2016	1AZJ04	6.03
When people proclaim that JJ and Kenneth are an inspiration and give them special treatment, Kenneth starts taking advantage, getting free admission to and various perks at a Dodgers game. At home, Ray and Dylan want to back out of widening a doorway for JJ so they can go paintballing. They convince Jimmy and Maya to come along and they all have lots of fun, but the kids soon feel guilty for having fun without JJ around. Maya realizes they've learned that guilt from her, so Jimmy tries to convince her it's okay to do things only she enjoys.
5	5	"H-a-l-Halloween"	Rob Cohen	Niki Schwartz-Wright	October 26, 2016	1AZJ05	5.85
Jimmy is upset that the kids no longer want to participate in the family tradition of dressing up for Halloween. Maya tries to cheer him up by allowing him to do things he loves that are on her "Dead to Me" list. Meanwhile, Ray recruits Dylan to help work the school's haunted mansion and Kenneth is scared of losing his job when JJ gets drunk at a party. Even though Maya is furious, she is thrilled to see JJ having a "normal" social life.
6	6	"D-a-t-e-Date?"	Phil Traill	Danny Chun & Mark Kunerth	November 9, 2016	1AZJ06	5.64
JJ meets Claire (McKaley Miller), a girl his age who is temporarily using a wheelchair due to twisting both her ankles in a gymnastics accident. Kenneth tries to fix them up despite JJ's insistence that Claire isn't interested in him that way. Meanwhile, Ray takes an embarrassing photo of his nipple, then tries to pass it off as a girl's nipple to some classmates, hoping he can become popular for receiving a "sext". Also, Jimmy tries to help Dylan deal with anger management after Dylan destroys a participation trophy in the school display case because she despises what it represents.
7	7	"T-h-a-Thanksgiving"	Claire Scanlon	Eric Lapidus	November 16, 2016	1AZJ08	5.72
Maya wants to make a game out of Jimmy's brother Billy (Rob Corddry) and his family's annoying habits when they visit for Thanksgiving, but everyone else worries that this will cause more family drama than necessary. Meanwhile, Ray and Kenneth take over Maya's annual dinner preparation despite their combined lack of cooking experience.
8	8	"R-a-y-c-Ray-Cation"	Bill Purple	Carrie Rosen & Seth Kurland	November 30, 2016	1AZJ07	4.98
Ray sets up morning drills for the family to make sure he gets to the dock on time for a school trip to the Channel Islands, which is still a month away. Claire continues to watch movies with JJ, but says her casts are being removed soon. Just before this happens, Ray helps JJ go to the hospital to tell Claire that he likes her, then stays home to help JJ deal with being rejected. Meanwhile, Dylan realizes she's too grown up now to use her predictive powers and help her father capitalize on what will be the hot toy of the Christmas season.
9	9	"S-l-Sled H-o-Hockey"	Ken Whittingham	Elizabeth Beckwith & Ron McCants	December 7, 2016	1AZJ10	4.59
On a trip with Jimmy to play arcade games at a local ice rink, JJ discovers a recreational sled hockey league. Despite his father's initial reluctance, the two discover themselves bonding when they take the ice. Meanwhile, Ray and Dylan butt heads over a secret crawlspace in the house, and Maya and Kenneth work on their relationship during a CPR class.
10	10	"C-h-o-Choir"	Christine Gernon	Jeremy Bronson & Niki Schwartz-Wright	December 14, 2016	1AZJ09	5.46
With the year coming to a close, Maya proclaims she is finally seeing the good in people. Her attitude quickly changes, however, when the van is stolen with all of the family's Christmas presents in it. Elsewhere, Ray looks for an extracurricular activity when he stumbles upon the school choir. He earns a solo and thinks he has finally found something he's skilled in besides his core academics, but JJ quickly worms his way into getting the solo instead, with Kenneth doing the actual singing.
11	11	"R-o-Road T-r-Trip"	Ben Lewin	Dan Holden & Miriam Datskovsky	January 4, 2017	1AZJ11	5.75
The DiMeos are set to embark on their annual free-form road trip, for which they have no agenda and just wing it. The ultra-organized Ray, however, has secretly plotted out a course to his own benefit, based on his family's habit of always out-voting him on which direction to go. On the way home, Ray comes down with appendicitis. Kenneth shows up at school to take notes for JJ and finds it awkward to hang out with the students without JJ by his side. He then tries to hang out with his old maintenance buddies, but they shun him since he is no longer one of them.
12	12	"H-e-r-Hero"	Victor Nelli, Jr.	Carrie Rosen	January 11, 2017	1AZJ12	5.93
In order to get on the good side of their insurance agent to get everything JJ needs, the DiMeos ask Dylan to make a tough sacrifice at her next track meet. Meanwhile, Ray wants to use his brother as inspiration for an essay contest at school, but JJ rejects his plan. But, when another student lies about being JJ's friend to write a similar essay, Ray and JJ team up to outdo the other student. They fail, but the fake inspirational speech encourages the insurance agent to support JJ.
13	13	"S-i-Sick D-a-Day"	Bill Purple	Elizabeth Beckwith & Seth Kurland	January 18, 2017	1AZJ13	5.39
When Maya gets sick, Jimmy is forced to be the mom of the house as Dylan becomes Kenneth's replacement when he too falls ill. JJ protects Dylan from a boy she's interested in, though she doesn't realize it at first and thinks her brother won't accept that she's blossoming. Meanwhile, despite the spread of illness, the family bands together and pulls an all-nighter to finish Ray's school project.
14	14	"V-a-l-Valentine's D-a-Day"	Stuart McDonald	Shana Goldberg-Meehan & Niki Schwartz-Wright	February 8, 2017	1AZJ15	5.54
While dining out with the family, Maya sees her ex-fiancé Ethan (Ken Marino), who was also Jimmy's former roommate. This leads her to tell the kids the story of how Jimmy stole her away from Ethan. The reminiscing makes Maya and Jimmy resolve to restore the "heat" in their relationship. At school, Ray receives a candy-gram from a secret admirer. Dylan finds the girl who sent it and realizes it was meant for a popular jock named Ray DiBlasio, not Ray DiMeo. Dylan decides to have fun by catfishing Ray as the admirer, but later regrets her actions. Meanwhile, JJ succumbs to his sugar addiction and eats several of the candy-grams he and Kenneth are supposed to be delivering.
15	15	"T-h-The C-l-Club"	Christine Gernon	Danny Chun & Matt Roller	February 15, 2017	1AZJ14	5.64
Maya lies her way into an exclusive club so that the family can use the pool. Ray feels at home at the club and asks Maya to teach him how to fit in there so he can keep attending. Meanwhile, a guy on JJ's sled hockey team shows off the computerized pad that speaks for him and JJ uses one to replace Kenneth after they fight.
16	16	"O-s-Oscar P-a-Party"	Christine Gernon	Danny Chun & Scott Silveri	February 22, 2017	1AZJ16	5.34
Maya is hosting her annual Oscar party for the mothers with disabled children club, but a mishap with the cable TV forces them to the home of new member Becca (Michaela Watkins). Becca annoys Maya by seemingly being able to do everything in addition to caring for her child, including looking nice and keeping a clean home. Jimmy finds that the club members' husbands are conditioned to do whatever they are told and he takes advantage of it. Elsewhere, Kenneth runs a movie trivia game for the kids, trying to make it fair enough to cover their multiple disabilities, while Ray falls for the sister of one of the kids and pretends to be a "free spirit" like her.
17	17	"S-u-r-Surprise"	Michael Weaver	Dan Holden	March 8, 2017	1AZJ17	4.99
Maya plans a surprise party for Dylan's birthday, even though Dylan herself is adamant about not having one. Ray is unnerved when JJ takes off on his own during their trip to the mall to buy their sister a present. Meanwhile, Jimmy and Kenneth desperately try to find something they have in common but, when they do, it leads to a fierce competition.
18	18	"D-i-Ding"	Cherie Nowlan	Matt Roller	March 15, 2017	1AZJ18	4.63
Ray accuses Maya of dinging a nearby car and leaves a note behind Maya's back, causing a rift between the two. Following through on a promise, Jimmy takes Dylan to the back room of a supermarket to search for a rare item. The DiMeos discover Kenneth moonlights as the supermarket's weekend manager.
19	19	"C-h-Cheater!"	Michael Weaver	Ron McCants	April 5, 2017	1AZJ19	4.75
JJ is accused of cheating on tests because it turns out Kenneth is helping him. Maya forces him to earn a good grade by himself, believing it will put him on the path to a good life. Dylan accidentally becomes popular when she sets a trend by wearing some clothing found in an unclaimed suitcase. Meanwhile, Ray falls for a Pyramid scheme, though his reasoning is he wonders how much money he will need in the future to help JJ. JJ overhears the family discussing his future and Maya saying he may never be able to live on his own, so he seeks out Kenneth.
20	20	"R-u-n-Runaway"	Claire Scanlon	Mark Kunerth	April 26, 2017	1AZJ20	4.45
Having heard the conversation about who will have to care for him, JJ goes to Kenneth's apartment, but Kenneth returns him home. Maya insists that JJ should be able to run away like any other boy, and she helps him do so. She soon encounters another wheelchair user, a young man (Zach Anner) who drives and has a girlfriend. She asks him if he can speak with JJ about living on his own. Meanwhile, Dylan tries to bond with Kenneth after learning he was a star basketball player in college, but Kenneth says he didn't like the kind of self-serving person he was back then and wants to leave that chapter behind.
21	21	"P-r-Prom"	Bill Purple	Story by : Eric Lapidus; Teleplay by : Elizabeth Beckwith	May 3, 2017	1AZJ21	4.41
Excited for prom, Ray thinks he's found the perfect girl until she uses the 'R-word' ("retard"), forcing Ray to consider where he stands on issues himself rather than just parroting what his family thinks. JJ hates the attention at the event and reaches out to others who feel like outcasts. Meanwhile, with the kids away, Maya and Jimmy use the opportunity to air out the arguments they cannot have in front of the kids, leading to Kenneth's questioning his future with the DiMeos.
22	22	"M-a-May-Jay"	Geeta Patel	Miriam Datskovsky & Bryan Keefer	May 10, 2017	1AZJ22	4.28
Wanting to prove to Maya he is ready to spend the summer at a camp for people with disabilities, JJ has a minor accident that necessitates knee surgery. Kenneth is distraught, having never seen JJ in the hospital before, but Maya is eventually convinced that JJ should go. Jimmy realizes he gets special treatment at the hospital. Meanwhile, Dylan is threatened when it's revealed Ray might be a faster runner than her.
23	23	"C-a-Camp"	Christine Gernon	Matt Roller & Danny Chun	May 17, 2017	1AZJ23	4.52
As the family readies for their flight to JJ's camp, Maya gets a surprise at the airport. Ray sees the summer as an opportunity to reinvent himself, while Jimmy and Dylan turn the trip to camp into a father/daughter bonding moment.

=== Season 2 (2017–18) ===
No. overall	No. in season	Title	Directed by	Written by	Original release date	Prod. code	US viewers (millions)
24	1	"W-e-We're B-a-Back!"	Christine Gernon	Scott Silveri	September 27, 2017	2AZJ01	5.03
With JJ still at camp, the DiMeo family realizes how much they use his condition as an excuse to not try very hard at anything else. Maya cleans up the house and yard, Jimmy starts showing up to work on time, and Dylan gets a summer job. This leaves Ray, who used to be the only voice of reason in a chaotic mess, feeling like he serves no function anymore. JJ returns home regretting that he never got his first kiss from a girl he met, so the DiMeos, with Kenneth's help, decide to intercept the girl as she travels with her family back to Seattle.
25	2	"F-i-First S-e-Second F-First Day"	Rob Cohen	Danny Chun	October 4, 2017	2AZJ02	4.55
The DiMeo kids are returning for a second year at the same school for the first time. Dylan realizes, while ushering a new student around, that she didn't learn much about the school nor did she make any close friends last year, expecting that the family would move again. Meanwhile, a previous speech Maya made to a group of parents with disabled children, praising the school's commitment to inclusiveness, comes back to haunt her. All the parents want to transfer their kids to the school and expect aides like Kenneth, which Principal Miller says the school cannot afford.
26	3	"J-J's D-r-Dream"	Christine Gernon	Seth Kurland	October 11, 2017	2AZJ03	4.32
After hearing how much his girlfriend Taylor does for her brother (who, like JJ, is disabled), Ray lies about having created a charity called JJ's Dream. JJ throws Ray under the bus to embarrass him, but later, he and the rest of the DiMeos decide that Ray needs some good fortune in his life and pitch in to pull off a fundraising event with only a few days' notice. Meanwhile, Dylan is irritated by having Kenneth back in the house so much but later realizes how much she missed him over the summer. Also, Jimmy is having a hard time being an assertive supervisor at work.
27	4	"T-r-Training D-a-Day"	Bill Purple	Carrie Rosen	October 18, 2017	2AZJ04	4.36
In the process of training some slacker employees at the school to become aides, Maya and Kenneth gain a new respect for each other. After Jimmy has "the talk" with Ray because he now has a girlfriend, Maya reminds him he never had a talk with JJ. Jimmy takes JJ camping to do so, but struggles to answer JJ's questions about his future. Soon, Jimmy learns just how well JJ can handle a crisis. Meanwhile, Dylan bonds with a cute boy over bullying Ray, but is disappointed when the boy gets bored and moves on to another target.
28	5	"N-i-Nightmares on D-i-Dimeo S-Street"	Christine Gernon	Matt Roller	October 25, 2017	2AZJ05	4.16
While searching for places where Maya might have hidden the Halloween candy, the DiMeo kids find a very old bag of candy that was left in a duct by a previous family. Eating the candy does strange things to them. JJ has his letter board swapped out for a Ouija board, which gives him superhuman powers and causes those who read for him to sound like demons. Ray and Dylan wake up to find that they are in each other's bodies. The whole family then gets trapped in an escape room because Maya can never be on time or follow the rules. The scenarios are finally revealed to have occurred in Kenneth's dream.
29	6	"S-h-Shipping"	Jay Chandrasekhar	Niki Schwartz-Wright	November 1, 2017	2AZJ06	3.86
Norah, a new girl with cerebral palsy, arrives at the school and the students of Lafayette High excitedly begin to "ship" her and JJ, which Kenneth explains means "a desire for two people to date." Meanwhile, Ray and Taylor worry about their future, causing Maya to be confused, so she forces them to play mini golf with her and Jimmy. This ultimately leads to a confession from Jimmy. Elsewhere, Dylan is disappointed about Lafayette's new ban on homecoming pranks and enlists the help of the "Prankensteins" from Lafayette's Class of '67 to bring them back.
30	7	"B-r-i-British I-n-v-Invasion"	Bill Purple	Tim Doyle	November 15, 2017	2AZJ07	4.41
Maya tries in vain to put up the front of a proper English household for her mother (Holland Taylor), who is visiting for Thanksgiving. Jimmy feels like his peak years are over when he fails to win his family a free meal by consuming the Godzilla Roll at their favorite sushi restaurant. Meanwhile, Kenneth deals with his visiting dad (Keith David), who still holds a grudge from many years ago, and Taylor brings her brother to the DiMeos for Thanksgiving, not knowing that he and JJ were rivals at camp.
31	8	"B-i-Bikini U-n-University"	Erin O'Malley	Danny Chun	November 29, 2017	2AZJ08	4.20
JJ convinces his parents to visit a college whose engineering program interests him but, in reality, he has signed up for a movie that is filming at the campus on the same day. As his plan unravels, JJ enlists the help of his new friend Tyson (Nick Viall), an actor in the movie who gives the performance of his life to keep JJ out of hot water with his parents. Meanwhile, Ray goes wild when he's left home alone for the first time and attempts to throw a party, but it doesn't exactly attract the crowd he expects.
32	9	"S-t-Star W-Wars"	Stuart McDonald	Story by : Danny Chun; Teleplay by : Matt Roller & Seth Kurland	December 6, 2017	2AZJ09	4.25
Two free tickets to the premiere of Star Wars: The Last Jedi courtesy of the Cerebral Palsy foundation promise a glorious night for JJ and Ray, who both share a love for the movie franchise. That is, until JJ chooses a pretty classmate to take to the premiere instead of Ray, which then prompts Ray to take someone that will irritate JJ. Back at home, Maya, Jimmy, and Dylan enjoy a rare night at home without the boys. Meanwhile, Kenneth's secret after-hours hangout at Lafayette is compromised when Dr. Miller discovers his late-night escapades and tries to join in. Kevin Smith stars as himself as he helps Ray get into the premiere.
33	10	"S-i-Silent Night"	Christine Gernon	Story by : Danny Chun; Teleplay by : Shana Goldberg-Meehan & Dan Holden	December 13, 2017	2AZJ10	4.56
When Dylan leverages JJ in an attempt to get a dog for the family, JJ responds by saying she will never understand what it is like to be him, prompting Dylan to do an experiment. Meanwhile, Ray and Taylor want Maya to meet Taylor's mom (Sarah Chalke), but realize the two moms have a history, leading to tension between the kids. Elsewhere, Kenneth reveals that, with every $100 spent, a free turkey will be given out at the supermarket where he works. Jimmy becomes desperate to get turkeys using discarded receipts, but not for the reason Kenneth expects.
34	11	"N-e-New Y-Year's E-Eve"	Ken Whittingham	Story by : Scott Silveri; Teleplay by : Danny Chun & Matt Roller	January 3, 2018	2AZJ11	4.37
Kenneth and the kids convince Maya and Jimmy that they can go out for New Year's Eve while they take care of the house. Fearful about his inexperience and knowing that Taylor wants to get more physical in their relationship, Ray invites his geeky friends for New Year's Eve to create a distraction and avoid being alone with Taylor. Kenneth helps Ray, as he is also trying to avoid the romantic advances of JJ's therapist. Unknown to Ray, Taylor has invited friends from her all-girls school, who are thrilled to be at a party with boys – even nerdy ones. A few of the girls take a special liking to JJ because he's a "good listener." Meanwhile, Dylan is disappointed when Pepper, the new family dog, shuns her.
35	12	"The H-u-s-Hustle"	Rob Cohen	Story by : Seth Kurland; Teleplay by : Carrie Rosen & Rosie Borchert	January 10, 2018	2AZJ12	4.44
Lafayette is hosting a 70's themed fundraiser to help upgrade the school elevator. At the fundraiser, Kenneth is the DJ, Jimmy finds platform shoes that cause him to be tall and give him confidence, and Maya meets a new friend, Sarah (Lennon Parham). However, when Sarah reveals she is against funding the elevator because the improvements only help a small minority of students, Maya plans an ambush to convince her that the elevator is, in fact, important. Elsewhere, the kids are left alone in the van, resulting in Ray unleashing his inner wild, carefree spirit, "Blaze." This causes a reluctant Dylan to be the responsible one. At the end of the episode, Dr. Miller reveals to Jimmy and Maya that JJ will be unable to graduate.
36	13	"D-i-Dimeo A-c-Academy"	Tristram Shapeero	Danny Chun & Matt Roller	January 17, 2018	2AZJ13	4.81
After learning JJ will not graduate, Maya confronts all of his teachers and Dr. Miller, only to realize there is nothing she can say to change their minds. Not willing to give up, she runs to JJ's rescue and launches her own school out of the DiMeo home, dubbing it DiMeo Academy. Ray joins the "Academy" after his farting in class spreads around school, with Dylan following after she is not elected captain for Lafayette's track team. Jimmy reluctantly joins the faculty, but later stands up to Maya. Meanwhile, Kenneth sets out to prove to his "gold-digger" ex-wife (Tamala Jones) that he's living a successful life after visiting her luxurious home to retrieve his old baseball cards.
37	14	"E-i-Eighteen"	Christine Gernon	Dan Holden	February 28, 2018	2AZJ14	4.11
JJ struggles with not being treated like an adult on his 18th birthday after hearing about what his friends did for their birthdays. He storms out of his own party, but soon learns a valuable lesson from Kenneth. Meanwhile, an exchange student moves in with Taylor, so Ray tries to make Taylor jealous with some of his father's old moves, like inviting a different girl to make Taylor jealous. The plan backfires and, when Ray admits to Taylor that the girl kissed him, she breaks up with Ray. Elsewhere, Dylan is recruited to be on the school's wrestling team, only to learn she has to wrestle a boy she likes to determine who represents the school in that weight class. While Dylan defeats the boy, she still has her first kiss.
38	15	"U-n-Unforgettable P-a-Pain"	Anya Adams	Elizabeth Beckwith	March 7, 2018	2AZJ15	4.44
After the breakup with Taylor, Ray is miserable, so Maya offers to cheer him up by having a mother-son day. However, Ray has a plan of his own and shows up at Taylor's work. Meanwhile, JJ is nervous about his first friend date with Aaron, a fellow classmate who is a major movie buff, so Dylan offers to make sure everything goes smoothly. However, everything they worry about going wrong happens. Back at home, Kenneth teaches Jimmy how to be the alpha male at home after the dog only listens to Kenneth's commands.
39	16	"One A-n-Angry M-Maya"	Bill Purple	Carrie Rosen & Zach Anner	March 14, 2018	2AZJ17	3.94
Maya has jury duty, which is like a vacation for her until she learns Taylor's mom, Melanie (Sarah Chalke), is also there. Despite a rough start to the court case, they bond through lengthening their time spent at the court away from home. Meanwhile, JJ lies about his disabilities on an online dating site after a few bad dates and Kenneth teaches him a valuable lesson about honesty in relationships as they both update their profiles. Elsewhere, Ray is upset Jimmy and Dylan spend so much together, though they surprise him with his own car.
40	17	"A-c-Action"	Rob Cohen	Danny Chun & Matt Roller	March 14, 2018	2AZJ16	3.55
JJ's thrilled when he is chosen by his classmates to film his horror movie project, but the pressure of directing soon gets to him and he starts accepting all suggestions, both good and bad. Meanwhile, Dylan's class project leads her to a secret of Maya's, but not what Dylan believes it to be. Elsewhere, Jimmy indulges his first love, architecture, to help his neighbor with a construction project, but it soon backfires for the DiMeos when their landlord learns they have a dog and evicts them.
41	18	"N-o-Nominee"	Christine Gernon	Scott Silveri & Danny Chun & Matt Roller	March 21, 2018	2AZJ18	4.60
JJ is nominated by two film festivals for his horror project. The first one in Vancouver chose him specifically for his disability out of tokenism because Maya sent letters out, so they return home. JJ later learns he won at a local film festival that was unaware of his disability. Jimmy tries to not get the kids worried about eviction by telling Dylan he is hunting a coyote, but eventually reveals the truth. Ray lets himself take falls in basketball to try and impress Taylor, but ultimately decides to let her go and improve himself. The Dimeos and Kenneth resolve to figure out where to live, as they sit among all their stuff on the front lawn.

=== Season 3 (2018–19) ===
No. overall	No. in season	Title	Directed by	Written by	Original release date	Prod. code	U.S. viewers (millions)
42	1	"L-o-n-London: Part 1"	Christine Gernon	Story by : Seth Kurland; Teleplay by : Scott Silveri	October 5, 2018	3AZJ01	2.43
The DiMeos cross the pond so Maya can ask her estranged father, the challenging Martin, for a loan to save their house. Meanwhile, Jimmy puts on his "fun dad" hat to ensure JJ has a great trip, Ray digs deep to summon Californian vibes to endear himself to British girls, and Kenneth reveals a love for all things royal. After mocking Kenneth, Dylan later admits that she also loves the royal family.
43	2	"L-o-n-London: Part 2"	Christine Gernon	Story by : Matt Roller; Teleplay by : Danny Chun	October 12, 2018	3AZJ02	2.26
Maya must choose between asking her father for money to save their house and a lasting relationship with him. Ray strives to bond with his new British family, only to discover Dylan's the one with a surprising connection. Meanwhile, JJ shows Kenneth a good time off-the-clock, and Jimmy inadvertently finds a best friend.
44	3	"I-n-Into the W-o-Woods"	Tristam Shapeero	Matt Roller	October 19, 2018	3AZJ03	2.30
Maya's Halloween becomes truly terrifying when JJ attends a rave in the woods. Ray joins Dylan's Halloween heist at school, determined to prove he's more than a do-gooder. Meanwhile, Jimmy and Kenneth turn the DiMeo home into the neighborhood's haunted house.
45	4	"N-e-New J.J."	Bill Purple	Carrie Rosen	November 2, 2018	3AZJ04	2.43
When JJ does up his own zipper for the first time, he starts doing more things for himself. He gets overconfident in a poker game, forcing Kenneth to step in. With JJ doing more for himself, Maya turns her attention to Ray. Ray at first loves it, but soon regrets it, making Maya see she'll have to find her own new purpose. Meanwhile, Dylan learns her bedtime is very early compared to her peers, so she stays up to see what Jimmy does at night.
46	5	"S-t-Stage Mom"	Bill Purple	Story by : Scott Silveri; Teleplay by : Danny Chun	November 9, 2018	3AZJ05	2.40
To prove she's more than a mother, Maya becomes director of a play and ends up putting on a one-woman show. Kenneth gets JJ a job at the supermarket but JJ wants to prove he can actually be useful. Meanwhile, Ray gets caught between the parents and other teens when he starts ratting out where parties will be.
47	6	"C-e-Celebrity S-u-Suite"	Christine Gernon	Seth Kurland	November 16, 2018	3AZJ06	2.60
When JJ ends up in the hospital for Thanksgiving, Maya is determined that he get the "celebrity suite" luxury room but Melanie and Logan are also there. After working together to clear it out, the mothers compete but call a truce for the holiday. Meanwhile, Ray is depressed Taylor is away with a new boyfriend, but a woman about to give birth changes his perspective. Meanwhile, Jimmy is surprised that his brother Billy gets along well with Kenneth.
48	7	"F-o-Follow T-h-r-Through"	Bill Purple	Elizabeth Beckwith & Dan Holden	December 7, 2018	3AZJ07	2.02
The DiMeos realize they have no follow-through in getting things done. Jimmy works on getting the garage ready for JJ's man-cave. Ray ropes Dylan into helping getting a park approved for the JJ's Dream Charity since she owes him Christmas favors. JJ tries to prepare for college by making coffee himself, causing Kenneth to think about his own future. Maya works on reconnecting with Jimmy and doing something just as a couple.
49	8	"J-i-Jingle T-h-Thon"	Rob Cohen	Greg Gallant	December 14, 2018	3AZJ08	2.08
After Ray saves the family from a small fire, Maya tells a white lie about the gifts they were giving the kids for Christmas. Ray is tormented by Dylan after the media gives Pepper the dog the credit and a charity steps in to replace the gifts they supposedly lost. They try to volunteer their time to make up for it but are given more things. When the truth comes out, they find people disgusted by them actually donate more to the charity. Meanwhile, JJ helps Kenneth confront his two sisters Kiki and Kendall in order to prove he can coach the girls' basketball team.
50	9	"J-a-Javier's P-a-Pants"	Bill Purple	Joshua Corey & Brian Kratz	January 4, 2019	3AZJ09	2.52
Realizing she can't follow JJ to college, Maya looks for a new purpose and gets involved with Melanie whose husband has left her, deciding to make stylish accessible clothing for people with disabilities together. Jimmy realizes Ray already learned from the internet how to do many things but Ray appreciates him as a father anyway; Jimmy finds a legal way to give Ray his first beer as a bonding experience. When Dylan is suspended from the track team, JJ takes her to Kenneth's basketball team to learn sportsmanship, though she also rubs off on him and the team.
51	10	"R-o-Roll M-o-Model"	Christine Gernon	Story by : Matt Roller; Teleplay by : Joshua Corey & Brian Kratz	January 11, 2019	3AZJ14	2.43
Maya wants herself and JJ to be mentors to a young boy with Cerebral Palsy and his father, but JJ disagrees with her lying to the boy about his potential in the future, only to discover she did the same for him at that age, and for good reason. Jimmy finds a free big screen TV at work, only to discover it makes him feel inferior. Ray and Dylan stumble into a teens' support group for the wrong reasons, only to realize it has real benefits after they are caught in their lies.
52	11	"H-Hey, You"	Molly McGlynn	Story by : Rosie Borchert; Teleplay by : Carrie Rosen	January 18, 2019	3AZJ10	2.58
Maya finds Kenneth to be a distraction to her new business when he starts seeing Melanie. They briefly try and get Melanie to choose between them but Maya relents to let Kenneth have someone in his life besides the DiMeos. Ray convinces JJ to cast him and crush Izzie in JJ's latest film, but JJ also ends up with a crush on her. Meanwhile, Dylan is impressed with Jimmy's band, not realizing they are playing older rock songs, making things complicated when she brings the band to the school.
53	12	"O-Our M-a-g-Mageddon"	Christine Gernon	Story by : Seth Kurland; Teleplay by : Matt Roller	January 25, 2019	3AZJ11	2.55
Dylan realizes people see her as a copy of Maya so she starts her first argument with her mother to prove them wrong and accidentally drives into the garage. Maya proves Dylan doesn't have to be her to be loved by her mother and gets Dylan her own (half) bedroom. Ray and JJ realize they both like Izzy but after Ray is rejected, Izzy admits she likes JJ but is frightened by his disability; he convinces her to just take things slow. Jimmy has to distract Joyce, JJ's physical therapist that had a fling with Kenneth, only to realize Kenneth might be using him too. However, he's surprised when Kenneth turns out to be a needy friend.
54	13	"F-a-Fashion 4 A-All"	Anya Adams	Danny Chun & Greg Gallant	February 1, 2019	3AZJ13	2.37
Maya and Melanie take their company Fashion 4 All to a convention for vendors with accessible products but find that between them, they've feuded with practically everyone there, including Maya with one of the judges. Jimmy and Kenneth help the audience see the company is a good one and give the women their motivation to fight for the brand. JJ takes Ray with him on a college tour, wanting to cut loose with no Maya to hold him back, only to have Ray do it. However, Ray accidentally gets drunk causing JJ to take care of Ray instead. Meanwhile, a standardized test proves Dylan is smartest in her grade. This causes Mr. Powers to get her to work through always believing Ray is the only smart one but also causes Dylan to be more mischievous.
55	14	"J-i-Jimmy V-a-l-Valentine"	Bill Purple	Elizabeth Beckwith	February 15, 2019	3AZJ12	2.35
Maya doesn't want Jimmy spending too much on her for Valentine's Day. When he buys many roses, they decide to sell them for quick cash only for Maya to realize gifts are how Jimmy expresses love, so she uses the money to buy a helicopter ride. JJ has his first date with Izzy, wanting Kenneth there, but Izzy finds it weird and has little in common with Kenneth. Kenneth explains love is something JJ needs to figure out on his own. He tracks down Izzy, but they are then interrupted by his parents in the helicopter. Meanwhile, Dylan tricks Ray into letting her onto a cruise with him to meet a guy she likes. However, after the guy turns out to just be using her, Ray defends Dylan, causing some real sibling bonding between them.
56	15	"G-a-Game N-i-Night"	Anya Adams	Seth Kurland & Eric Wojtanik	February 22, 2019	3AZJ15	2.25
Maya insists it's time the family meet Izzy, so JJ arranges a game night. With Ray having gotten his driver's license he says it is half JJ's and they go to get a cake for the night. When fog and hitting a tree delay them, Ray admits he feels guilty he hits milestones in life that JJ cannot. JJ tells him not to worry about things they can't control. Jimmy sees a text on Izzy's phone that indicates she and JJ have a secret. Maya turns the game into an interrogation but Izzy is able to get them both to calm down and give her a chance. Meanwhile, Dylan and Kenneth eat Jimmy's famous cheese ball. JJ reveals the secret is Izzy is going to college in New York, and he wants to go there for film school.
57	16	"W-h-Wheelchair P-l-Planet"	Christine Gernon	Story by : Scott Silveri; Teleplay by : Matt Roller	March 1, 2019	3AZJ16	2.12
JJ has everyone throw together his film about a world where everyone uses a wheelchair except one outcast that can walk. Maya refuses to help but Dr. Miller is able to make her see JJ leaving her is part of parenting, inspiring her to help him finish. It turns out Dylan sabotaged the film as she doesn't want JJ to leave either, but she is able to accept it and JJ turns in a film about his friends and family instead. Jimmy has awkward moments when he mistakes Izzy for Maya multiple times. Meanwhile, Ray and Kenneth try to erase footage off a hidden nanny-cam they didn't realize Jimmy had while it's being used for JJ's film.
58	17	"S-p-Special B-Boy T-i-Time"	Rob Cohen	Broti Gupta	March 8, 2019	3AZJ17	2.24
Ray's attempt to manipulate Maya over an unfulfilled promise of mother-son time backfires when she calls his bluff, though they both end up enjoying their time together and Ray admits he's sometimes felt neglected with Maya focusing on JJ so much and now her business. JJ tries a new aide after he and Kenneth agree to spend a day apart; they quickly end up back together, making Kenneth realize he needs to slowly start letting JJ be more independent before college, and JJ admits he loves Kenneth. Meanwhile, Jimmy's unsure how to handle Dylan's teen angst when she invites a boy over.
59	18	"S-e-Seoul B-r-Brothers"	Bill Purple	Danny Chun	March 15, 2019	3AZJ18	2.20
JJ gets a paycheck for Social Security Benefits and decides to be generous and give gifts to his family. Once this inappropriate spending is discovered, along with his job at Kenneth's grocery store, he has to pay the money back. He resorts to panhandling from people who feel sorry for him, but his parents offer to bail him out, with the expectation he'll pay them back-in about twenty years. Meanwhile, Kenneth discovers Jimmy secretly performs with a Korean wedding band when he should be working, and Maya goes out for weekly drinks with Melanie, both secretly adding to the DiMeos large debt. Kenneth discovers at their current spending rate, they'll be bankrupt in two years, so Jimmy and Maya decide to keep doing what they want until then. Meanwhile, Taylor is Ray's competition at a Quiz Bowl, leaving him torn whether to throw the competition for her or win for his teammate who needs a partial scholarship. He chooses his friend over her but answers incorrectly, causing them to lose anyway.
60	19	"P-r-o-m-p-Promposal"	Anya Adams	Dan Holden	March 22, 2019	3AZJ19	2.40
Izzy doesn't want to go to prom, so Dylan and Ray find an actress, Cassidy, to go with JJ, also educating her about how her role in a movie about a person in a wheelchair is offensive. Once Izzy sees pictures online, she comes to the prom, but JJ still dances with the other girl. JJ and Izzy compromise and make up in the end. Maya and Melanie need an investor for their business, also forcing Maya to take criticism. Melanie has a rich friend that is attracted to her, making Kenneth uncomfortable. Maya walks out when he insults JJ and Logan as the product models but Jimmy makes her realize she needs to take her dream seriously, and Maya also encourages Jimmy to go back to his love of architecture. They get the investment, much to Kenneth's chagrin.
61	20	"On the R-o-Road A-g-Again"	Jay Chandrasekhar	Matt Roller & Carrie Rosen	March 29, 2019	3AZJ20	2.05
Kenneth finds an aide named Tim in Seattle, who is willing to relocate to L.A. when JJ goes to college. On one last family road trip to meet him, they get a flat tire. JJ and Jimmy end up having fun together on the journey to replace it, making Jimmy realize he needs his own time with JJ before he leaves, not just Maya. Dylan struggles to spend a quarter she found. Meanwhile, Maya is insulted Kenneth made his own manual for being JJ's aide and both versions end up being tossed in a river. A bear attack makes Kenneth and Maya realize they are best friends before they are saved by Ray and recover both binders. They finally make it to meet Tim, only for him to flee seconds after seeing what the DiMeos are like.
62	21	"The S-t-a-Staircase"	Danny Chun	Zach Anner and Greg Gallant	April 5, 2019	3AZJ21	2.28
JJ goes to meet Izzy's overprotective parents but they consider him harmless because he uses a wheelchair. In order to prove them wrong, Izzy and JJ decide to put JJ in her bed for when they return but end up needing help from Joyce (JJ's physical therapist) and another man to get JJ up the staircase. JJ is embarrassed, but Izzy thinks no less of him. A mishap with JJ's accessible pants also makes things worse when her outraged father sees him but he does help carry JJ back down the stairs. Meanwhile, Maya and Melanie are invited to a reception held by The Cerebral Palsy Foundation, and Maya is jealous when Logan serenades his mother with an opera song. Dylan and Ray just make things worse. Melanie says Maya should be proud of all JJ is accomplishing while Maya also compliments Melanie's parenting. Jimmy and Kenneth tour Kenneth's old local college in an attempt to get JJ to study somewhere close to home, only to find out Kenneth flunked out; Jimmy's fatherly advice convinces Kenneth to enroll again.
63	22	"U-n-r– Unrealistic"	Bill Purple	Scott Silveri and Matt Roller	April 12, 2019	3AZJ22	2.31
Izzy is rejected by NYU, and she and JJ decide to enroll in a local school together, thrilling Maya. Izzy breaks up with JJ when she realizes he actually got in but doesn't want to lose her by going to New York. Maya tells him it's his choice, but he's spent his life achieving what others have told him is unrealistic to have the life he wants. Ray ends up being the only boy on a class trip, only to find all the girls dislike him for pursuing all of them without knowing any of them. Ray shows real vulnerability, causing the girls to want to help him improve next year. Jimmy tries to get an architecture job, needing Dylan's encouragement along the way and succeeds. Kenneth and the family are too emotional at JJ's graduation speech, so Maya delivers most of it, and Kenneth closes it by encouraging JJ's classmates to be unrealistic in pursuing their dreams. JJ gets himself ready alone in New York, timed by his family and Kenneth as they practice getting him to be late by just fifteen minutes-the DiMeo way.

== Ratings ==
=== Season 1 ===
Viewership and ratings per episode of List of Speechless episodes
No.	Title	Air date	Rating/share (18–49)	Viewers (millions)	DVR (18–49)	Total (18–49)
1	"P-i-Pilot"	September 21, 2016	2.0/8	7.38	0.9	2.9
2	"N-e-New A-i-Aide"	September 28, 2016	1.8/6	6.43	0.8	2.6
3	"B-o-n-Bonfire"	October 5, 2016	1.8/6	6.03	0.8	2.6
4	"I-n-s-Inspirations"	October 12, 2016	1.8/7	6.03	—N/a	—N/a
5	"H-a-l-Halloween"	October 26, 2016	1.7/5	5.85	0.7	2.4
6	"D-a-t-e-Date?"	November 9, 2016	1.7/6	5.64	—N/a	—N/a
7	"T-h-a-Thanksgiving"	November 16, 2016	1.7/6	5.72	—N/a	—N/a
8	"R-a-y-c-Ray-Cation"	November 30, 2016	1.5/5	4.98	0.6	2.1
9	"S-l-Sled H-o-Hockey"	December 7, 2016	1.3/5	4.59	—N/a	—N/a
10	"C-h-o-Choir"	December 14, 2016	1.6/5	5.46	0.6	2.2
11	"R-o-Road T-r-Trip"	January 4, 2017	1.7/6	5.75	—N/a	—N/a
12	"H-e-r-Hero"	January 11, 2017	1.8/6	5.93	—N/a	—N/a
13	"S-i-Sick D-a-Day"	January 18, 2017	1.6/6	5.39	—N/a	—N/a
14	"V-a-l-Valentine's D-a-Day"	February 8, 2017	1.6/6	5.54	—N/a	—N/a
15	"T-h-The C-l-Club"	February 15, 2017	1.6/6	5.64	—N/a	—N/a
16	"O-s-Oscar P-a-Party"	February 22, 2017	1.6/5	5.34	—N/a	—N/a
17	"S-u-r-Surprise"	March 8, 2017	1.5/5	4.99	—N/a	—N/a
18	"D-i-Ding"	March 15, 2017	1.3/5	4.63	—N/a	—N/a
19	"C-h-Cheater!"	April 5, 2017	1.4/5	4.75	—N/a	—N/a
20	"R-u-n-Runaway"	April 26, 2017	1.2/5	4.45	—N/a	—N/a
21	"P-r-Prom"	May 3, 2017	1.2/5	4.41	—N/a	—N/a
22	"M-a-May-Jay"	May 10, 2017	1.1/4	4.28	—N/a	—N/a
23	"C-a-Camp"	May 17, 2017	1.2/5	4.52	—N/a	—N/a

=== Season 2 ===
Viewership and ratings per episode of List of Speechless episodes
No.	Title	Air date	Rating/share (18–49)	Viewers (millions)
1	"W-e-We're B-a-Back!"	September 27, 2017	1.4/5	5.03
2	"F-i-First S-e-Second F-First Day"	October 4, 2017	1.3/5	4.55
3	"J-J's D-r-Dream"	October 11, 2017	1.1/4	4.32
4	"T-r-Training D-a-Day"	October 18, 2017	1.1/4	4.36
5	"N-i-Nightmares on D-i-Dimeo S-Street"	October 25, 2017	1.1/4	4.16
6	"S-h-Shipping"	November 1, 2017	1.0/3	3.86
7	"B-r-i-British I-n-v-Invasion"	November 15, 2017	1.1/4	4.41
8	"B-i-Bikini U-n-University"	November 29, 2017	1.1/4	4.20
9	"S-t-Star W-Wars"	December 6, 2017	1.1/4	4.25
10	"S-i-Silent Night"	December 13, 2017	1.2/4	4.56
11	"N-e-New Y-Year's E-Eve"	January 3, 2018	1.1/4	4.37
12	"The H-u-s-Hustle"	January 10, 2018	1.2/5	4.44
13	"D-i-Dimeo A-c-Academy"	January 17, 2018	1.3/5	4.81
14	"E-i-Eighteen"	February 28, 2018	1.1/4	4.11
15	"U-n-Unforgettable P-a-Pain"	March 7, 2018	1.2/5	4.44
16	"One A-n-Angry M-Maya"	March 14, 2018	0.9/4	3.94
17	"A-c-Action"	March 14, 2018	0.9/4	3.55
18	"N-o-Nominee"	March 21, 2018	1.2/5	4.60

=== Season 3 ===
Viewership and ratings per episode of List of Speechless episodes
No.	Title	Air date	Rating/share (18–49)	Viewers (millions)	DVR (18–49)	Total (18–49)
1	"L-o-n-London: Part 1"	October 5, 2018	0.5/2	2.43	—N/a	—N/a
2	"L-o-n-London: Part 2"	October 12, 2018	0.4/2	2.26	—N/a	—N/a
3	"I-n-Into the W-o-Woods"	October 19, 2018	0.5/2	2.30	—N/a	—N/a
4	"N-e-New J.J."	November 2, 2018	0.5/2	2.43	—N/a	—N/a
5	"S-t-Stage Mom"	November 9, 2018	0.5/2	2.40	—N/a	—N/a
6	"C-e-Celebrity S-u-Suite"	November 16, 2018	0.6/3	2.60	—N/a	—N/a
7	"F-o-Follow T-h-r-Through"	December 7, 2018	0.5/2	2.02	—N/a	—N/a
8	"J-i-Jingle T-h-Thon"	December 14, 2018	0.4/2	2.08	—N/a	—N/a
9	"J-a-Javier's P-a-Pants"	January 4, 2019	0.5/2	2.52	0.3	0.8
10	"R-o-Roll M-o-Model"	January 11, 2019	0.5/3	2.43	0.4	0.9
11	"H-Hey You"	January 18, 2019	0.6/3	2.58	—N/a	—N/a
12	"O-Our M-a-g-Mageddon"	January 25, 2019	0.6/3	2.55	—N/a	—N/a
13	"F-a-Fashion 4 A-All"	February 1, 2019	0.5/3	2.37	—N/a	—N/a
14	"J-i-Jimmy V-a-l-Valentine"	February 15, 2019	0.5/3	2.35	0.3	0.8
15	"G-a-Game N-i-Night"	February 22, 2019	0.5/3	2.25	0.3	0.8
16	"W-h-Wheelchair P-l-Plane"	March 1, 2019	0.4/2	2.12	—N/a	—N/a
17	"S-p-Special B-Boy T-i-Time"	March 8, 2019	0.4/2	2.24	—N/a	—N/a
18	"S-e-Seoul B-r-Brothers"	March 15, 2019	0.4/2	2.20	0.3	0.7
19	"P-r-o-m-p-Promposal"	March 22, 2019	0.5/3	2.40	—N/a	—N/a
20	"On the R-o-Road A-g-Again"	March 29, 2019	0.4/2	2.05	0.3	0.7
21	"The S-t-a-Staircase"	April 5, 2019	0.5/3	2.28	—N/a	—N/a
22	"U-n-r– Unrealistic"	April 12, 2019	0.5/3	2.31	—N/a	—N/a
