= The Paul Reiser Show =

American comedy television series

- Genre: Sitcom
- Created by: Paul Reiser
- Developed by: Paul Reiser; Jonathan Shapiro
- Written by: Paul Reiser; Jonathan Shapiro
- Starring: Paul Reiser; Ben Shenkman; Omid Djalili; Duane Martin; Andrew Daly; Amy Landecker; Brock Waidmann; Koby Rouviere
- Country of origin: United States
- Original language: English
- No. of seasons: 1
- No. of episodes: 7 (5 unaired)

Production
- Executive producers: Paul Reiser; Jonathan Shapiro
- Camera setup: Single-camera
- Running time: 22 minutes
- Production companies: Nuance Productions; Warner Bros. Television

Original release
- Network: NBC
- Release: April 14 – April 21, 2011

The Paul Reiser Show is an American sitcom television series, centered around actor Paul Reiser (as himself), that was originally aired on NBC. In May 2010, NBC announced that it had approved the series for the 2010–11 television season, with the half-hour comedy expected to premiere as a midseason replacement. The series premiered on April 14, 2011, at 8:30 pm. Due to extremely low ratings, the program was canceled on April 22, 2011, after only two episodes. The series was produced by Warner Bros. Television.

== Premise ==
The semi-autobiographical sitcom stars Paul Reiser as a former television star who has not worked on a television series in several years. While he has enjoyed spending quality time with his family during this break, he feels he needs something more. Deciding to shake up his life a bit, Reiser enlists his friends to help him find the next "big thing" to occupy his time.

== Cast ==
- Paul Reiser as himself
- Ben Shenkman as Jonathan
- Omid Djalili as Habib
- Duane Martin as Fernando
- Andrew Daly as Brad
- Amy Landecker as Claire, Paul's wife
- Brock Waidmann as Zeke
- Koby Rouviere as Gabe
- Larry Dorf as Alex Gimple

== Development and production ==
Reiser wrote the spec script for the untitled project, and first pitched the show to HBO, which turned it down. NBC ordered a pilot episode in February 2010. In early March, reports were referring to the project as Next. Amy Landecker was the first actor cast in late March, followed by Duane Martin in early April. Brock Waidmann, an actor with spina bifida, was selected to play the role of Reiser's son. Immediately after the audition Reiser said, "I love this kid!" The next day they called him to offer the part.

NBC announced a pick-up of the series in mid-May and also announced the additions of Andrew Daly, Ben Shenkman, Brock Waidmann, Koby Rouviere and Omid Djalili to the cast.

Seven half-hour episodes were produced, all from scripts already written by Reiser and Jonathan Shapiro.

The series was introduced at the NBC upfront presentation with the new name The Paul Reiser Show. The show premiered on April 14, 2011, replacing Perfect Couples.

== Reception ==
The show did not receive good ratings. The premiere episode received ratings lower than those for the premiere of Perfect Couples, the show it had replaced. Reuters reported that the show's premiere attracted "NBC's lowest rating ever for an in-season comedy premiere". The second episode's ratings dropped even further and the show was canceled shortly after. Amy Landecker said she first learned of the show's demise by doing an Internet search before getting an email confirming the show's official cancellation hours later.

The show was also negatively reviewed, with Metacritic reporting a rating of only 38 out of 100. Emily VanDerWerff of The A.V. Club gave the show a D+, writing that it was best summarized by the word "complacent" and that "everything about it feels off-putting and weird". She compared it unfavorably to Curb Your Enthusiasm, calling it a "weird copycat" that "takes most of the trappings of Curb but misses almost all of the soul". Alan Pergament, the TV critic for The Buffalo News, also drew comparisons between Curb Your Enthusiasm (going so far as to call it a "direct steal") and the drama Men of a Certain Age, but noted that Reiser's "good guy" personality was not as good a fit for the format as Larry David's arrogance was for Curb.

== Episodes ==
No.	Title	Directed by	Original release date	Prod. code	U.S. viewers (millions)
1	"Pilot"	Bryan Gordon	April 14, 2011	2J5601	3.372
Paul is asked to host a new game show produced by Mark Burnett, but his friend Larry David is given the same offer. Meanwhile, Brad is upset that Fernando may have tricked him to get a better school project for their children's class.
2	"The Playdate"	Daniel Stern	April 21, 2011	2J5606	2.377
Paul is asked to look after his son's playdate. Henry Rollins holds a grudge against Paul feeling he is responsible for him not getting a film role. Habib helps Paul get a screaming cat from under his backyard.
3	"The Generator"	Helen Hunt	Unaired	2J5602	N/A
4	"The Batting Cage"	Peter Lauer	Unaired	2J5603	N/A
5	"The Old Guy"	Don Scardino	Unaired	2J5604	N/A
6	"The Genrator"	Beth McCarthy Miller	Unaired	2J5605	N/A
7	"The Shave"	Dennie Gordon	Unaired	2J5607	N/A
