= Fall schedule =

The fall schedule is the broadcast programming television lineup for the five major American commercial broadcast networks. It usually consists of new television shows paired with returning favorites and runs from September to December, since an altered lineup usually runs from January to May when more new shows (midseason replacement) premiere.

Historically, the fall television schedule was created to help auto advertisers promote their new car models.

Recently, several television networks have staggered new and returning shows without necessarily following a fall and spring schedule. NBC announced in February 2008 that it would follow a "52-week television season," likely with fewer television episodes per season than the current standard 22.
