= Shana Goldberg-Meehan =

American television writer

- Born: United States
- Occupations: Writer, television producer
- Spouse: Scott Silveri (m. 2006)
- Parents: Gary David Goldberg (father); Diana Meehan (mother)

Shana Goldberg-Meehan is an American television producer and television writer.

She was an executive producer of Friends and its spinoff Joey, which she also co-created with Scott Silveri, whom she married in 2006 (they met when they were Harvard students, she was on the business staff and he was an editor for the Harvard Lampoon ). In 2005, she left Joey and Silveri stayed on the show. In 2010, she created the series Better with You which ended in 2011.

Goldberg-Meehan's father was comedy writer Gary David Goldberg, best known for creating Family Ties.

== Filmography ==
Year	Title	Writer	Executive Producer	Network	Notes
1996	Mad About You	Yes	No	NBC	Writer of 2 episodes
1996–2004	Friends	Yes	Yes	NBC	
2004–2006	Joey	Yes	Yes	NBC	Creator, writer of 4 episodes
2006	Separated at Worth	Yes	Yes	ABC	Unsold TV pilot
2007	The Hill	Yes	Yes	ABC	Unsold TV pilot
2010	Better with You	Yes	Yes	ABC	Creator, writer of 4 episodes
2016	Speechless	Yes	No	ABC	Writer of 2 episodes
2020	Untitled Workplace comedy	Yes	Yes	ABC	
