= Your OWN Show: Oprah's Search for the Next TV Star =

- Created by: Oprah Winfrey
- Starring: Nancy O'Dell; Carson Kressley; Oprah Winfrey (on occasion)
- Judges: Nancy O'Dell; Carson Kressley; Various guest judges
- Country of origin: United States
- No. of seasons: 1
- No. of episodes: 8

Production
- Executive producers: Mark Burnett, Lee Metzger
- Running time: 60 minutes

Original release
- Network: OWN
- Release: January 7 – February 25, 2011

Your OWN Show: Oprah's Search for the Next TV Star is a reality competition show, created by Oprah Winfrey. The show aired from January 7, 2011 to February 25, 2011 on the Oprah Winfrey Network.

Hosted by Nancy O'Dell and Carson Kressley, it featured ten prospective television hosts competing to earn their own television show on the OWN network. Each week, the contestants competed in a themed-television show challenge, where they were watched and judged by O'Dell, Kressley, and a guest judge and mentor, whose expertise is in the theme that week. After the production and filming, one contestant was eliminated, until the best host remained. Zach Anner and Kristina Kuzmic-Crocco were both chosen as the winners. Besides winning their television show, the champions also received $100,000 and a 2011 Chevrolet Equinox.

The executive producer was Mark Burnett, who has produced many reality competitions, such as The Apprentice, Survivor, and Design Star.

== Contestants ==
Out of the thousands who applied, ten contestants were chosen to compete.

Contestant	Age	Hometown	Style of show	Result
Leigh Koechner	44	Valley Village, California	Celebrity-driven traditional talk show	Eliminated 1st Episode 1
Eric Warren	57	Los Angeles, California	Healthy cooking and weight loss show	Eliminated 2nd Episode 2
Aunt Flora	60	Cincinnati, Ohio	Cooking show	Eliminated 3rd Episode 3
Tony Roach	61	Abilene, Texas	Self-love talk show	Withdrew; Episode 4
Elizabeth Espinosa	36	Lawndale, California	Traditional talk show	Eliminated 5th Episode 5
Ryan O'Connor	29	West Hollywood, California	Variety-style talk show	Eliminated 6th/7th Episode 6
Alicia Taylor	39	Las Vegas, Nevada	Financial advice show	Eliminated 6th/7th Episode 6
Terey Summers	46	Goodyear, Arizona	Comedic traditional talk show	Eliminated 8th Episode 7
Zach Anner	25	Buffalo, New York	Wheelchair travel show	WINNER
Kristina Kuzmic-Crocco	31	Alhambra, California	Cooking show	WINNER

=== Contestant Progress ===
Place	Hosts	Episodes							
Place	Hosts	1	2	3	4	5	6	7	8
1	Kristina	LOW	WIN	IN	HIGH	LOW*	HIGH	HIGH	WINNER
1	Zach	HIGH	IN	HIGH	IN*	HIGH	IN	HIGH	WINNER
3	Terey	IN	HIGH	LOW*	HIGH	IN	WIN	OUT	
4-5	Alicia	WIN	IN	HIGH	IN	WIN	OUT		
4-5	Ryan	HIGH	LOW*	HIGH	LOW	HIGH	OUT*		
6	Elizabeth	LOW*	HIGH	IN	WIN	OUT			
7	Tony	HIGH	IN	WIN	WD				
8	Aunt Flora	IN	HIGH	OUT					
9	Eric	HIGH	OUT						
10	Leigh	OUT							

(WINNER) The host won the series and received their own show.
(WIN) The host was the executive producer of the winning team.
(HIGH) The host was on the winning team. (Episode 7 had individual interviews)
(IN) The host was on the losing team, but was safe.
(LOW) The host was mentioned as one of the worst, and was a candidate for elimination, while ultimately not being chosen.
(LOW) The host was in the bottom two, took part in the elimination interview, and was saved.
(OUT) The host was eliminated.
(WD) The host voluntarily withdrew from the competition.

(*) The host was the losing team's executive producer.

== Episodes ==
=== Episode 1: "It Takes A Village" ===
- First Aired: January 7, 2011
- Television show theme: Sex and relationships
- Guest mentor and judge: Dr. Phil
- Summary: The ten contestants arrive at OWN studios, where they are greeted by O'Dell, Kressley, and Oprah herself. The hosts are split into two teams: a women's (Team Vision) and men's (Team Focus). As there are only four men, they choose Alicia to join their team, and even out the numbers. They are informed of their first challenge, to interview people on the street on the topic of sex and relationships, and then discuss the questions brought up with this week's guest mentor, Dr. Phil. As an added twist, the teams are required to interview the opposite sex. Alicia and Elizabeth step up to the challenge of being the executive producers for their teams' segments. When rehearsing with Dr. Phil, both teams have to readjust parts of their segments, but overall Team Focus shows more potential. This proves true when they produce a much better segment than Team Vision. At elimination, Team Focus is announced as the winning team, and Team Vision is asked who is responsible for their loss. All of the women say executive producer Elizabeth is, but Elizabeth chooses Aunt Flora, who she says did nothing. The judges deliberate, mentioning Elizabeth, Kristina, and Leigh as the most responsible for producing the terrible segment. In the end, they choose Elizabeth (who let her team down as executive producer) and Leigh (who was a rude host, cutting Dr. Phil off) as the bottom two. They both must do a short one-on-one interview with Dr. Phil to prove they should stay. Elizabeth delivers with an insightful topic she can relate to (family member with a disability). Leigh does not show improvement in her interview, and once again interrupts Dr. Phil. Leigh becomes the first host sent home.
- Host Eliminated: Leigh Koechner

=== Episode 2: "Let the Transformations Begin" ===
- First Aired: January 14, 2011
- Television show theme: Beauty makeovers
- Guest mentor and judge: Vera Wang
- Host Eliminated: Eric Warren

=== Episode 3: "Who Gets the Last Laugh?" ===
- First Aired: January 21, 2011
- Television show theme: Late-night comedy segment
- Guest mentor and judge: Arsenio Hall
- Host Eliminated: Aunt Flora

=== Episode 4: "Get the Salmon in the Pan" ===
- First Aired: January 28, 2011
- Television show theme: Cooking show
- Guest mentor and judge: Curtis Stone
- Host Eliminated (withdrew): Tony Roach

=== Episode 5: "Do It With Style" ===
- First Aired: February 4, 2011
- Television show theme: Thirty second commercial for Kohl's & a television interview (with Fuentes)
- Guest mentor and judge: Daisy Fuentes
- Host Eliminated: Elizabeth Espinosa

=== Episode 6: "Dollars and Sense" ===
- First Aired: February 11, 2011
- Television show theme: Financial advice
- Guest mentor and judge: Suze Orman
- Hosts Eliminated: Ryan O'Conner, Alicia Taylor

=== Episode 7: "I Have Some Questions for You" ===
- First Aired: February 18, 2011
- Television show theme: Press junket (as applied to promoting their own TV show)
- Guest mentor and judge: Gayle King
- Summary: The episode opens with O'Dell and Kressley informing Zach, Kristina and Terey that Ryan and Alicia were both eliminated and that the remaining challenges would be individual. After the opening credits, O'Dell and Kressley brief the final three about the press junket at the Sheraton Universal hotel, and bring out guest mentor Gayle King to advise them before the interviews on how to handle the press and promote the network. The contestants interview with both Craig Tomashoff of TV Guide and Kevin Frazier of Entertainment Tonight. They are then told about a third interview to complete, and the guest interviewer is none other than Oprah herself. Zach is the only one who takes the initiative to ask Oprah insightful questions during what could be a once in a lifetime opportunity. Following the interviews, they return to OWN Studios and chat about their "Oprah moment" before they pose for publicity photographs. When they return to Stage 2, O'Dell and Kressley reveal that Gayle had been watching all the interviews, and they discuss how the junket went and that all three bring something unique to the table before adding that a final interview with Gayle could decide the finalists. In elimination, Zach is praised for being steady throughout the competition, and O'Dell announces he is the first finalist. While Kristina and Terey both did well, they felt Terey's direction for her show was not clear enough, and chose Kristina as the other finalist.
- Host Eliminated: Terey Summers

=== Episode 8: "And the Winner Is..." ===
- Television show theme: Producing a pilot episode for their own TV show
- Guest mentor and judge: Mark Burnett
- Host Eliminated: None
- Winner of their OWN show: Kristina Kuzmic-Crocco and Zach Anner
