= Perfect Couples =

- Kyle Bornheimer, Christine Woods, Mary Elizabeth Ellis, David Walton, Olivia Munn, and Hayes MacArthur
- Genre: Sitcom
- Created by: Jon Pollack; Scott Silveri
- Starring: Kyle Bornheimer; Christine Woods; David Walton; Mary Elizabeth Ellis; Hayes MacArthur; Olivia Munn
- Theme music composer: A.C. Newman
- Composer: Mateo Messina
- Country of origin: United States
- Original language: English
- No. of seasons: 1
- No. of episodes: 13 (2 aired online)

Production
- Executive producers: Jon Pollack; Scott Silveri; Andy Ackerman
- Producer: Marc Solakian
- Camera setup: Single-camera
- Running time: 30 minutes
- Production companies: Universal Media Studios; Open 4 Business Productions

Original release
- Network: NBC
- Release: December 20, 2010 – April 7, 2011

Perfect Couples is an American sitcom television series that was originally broadcast by NBC. The half-hour romantic comedy was co-created by Jon Pollack and Scott Silveri and produced by Universal Media Studios. A sneak preview of the series aired on December 20, 2010, and officially premiered on January 20, 2011, as a mid-season replacement for the 2010–11 television season. The show was filmed in Los Angeles.

On April 14, 2011, the show was replaced in its timeslot with The Paul Reiser Show which was cancelled 11 days later on April 25 after only two episodes. NBC officially canceled Perfect Couples on May 13, 2011.

== Plot ==
Perfect Couples revolves around three couples at various stages in their relationships, yet who face similar problems. Vance and Amy are a couple who fight a lot and have a very active sex life. Rex and Leigh view themselves as relationship experts and therefore a "perfect couple", while Dave and Julia are considered the normal pair to whom everyone can relate.

== Cast ==
- Kyle Bornheimer as Dave
- Christine Woods as Julia
- David Walton as Vance
- Mary Elizabeth Ellis as Amy
- Hayes MacArthur as Rex
- Olivia Munn as Leigh
- Nicolette Robinson as Isabella

== Production ==
=== Development ===
In early February 2010, NBC announced that it had green-lighted a pilot script by creators Jon Pollack and Scott Silveri. Olivia Munn was the first actress cast in mid-February. David Walton came on board the project in early March, followed soon by Mary Elizabeth Ellis and Hayes MacArthur. In late March 2010, Christine Woods was cast in what was described as the female lead. Kyle Howard rounded out the main cast in mid-April.

NBC announced a pick up of the series on May 12, 2010, which is currently planned as a midseason replacement.

On June 3, 2010, comedian and writer Jen Kirkman announced she would be leaving late-night show Chelsea Lately to join the writing staff for Perfect Couples.

On July 1, 2010, Deadline.com reported that Kyle Bornheimer had replaced Kyle Howard as Dave due to uncertainty whether the actor would be available due to TBS' decision to see how the fourth season of My Boys performed before deciding whether to renew or cancel the series. TBS cancelled the series less than three months later.

=== Cancellation ===
On March 22, 2011, it was announced that The Paul Reiser Show would replace Perfect Couples, even though the show still had two unaired episodes remaining. Mid-April is not a typical time for a prime-time network television show to finish its run, leading many to believe the show may be canceled. However, the premiere of The Paul Reiser Show fared even worse in the ratings, showing even more uncertainty for the timeslot, and was itself canceled after only two episodes. Perfect Couples was officially cancelled on May 13, 2011.

== Episodes ==
No.	Title	Directed by	Written by	Original release date	Prod. code	U.S. viewers (millions)
1	"Perfect Tens"	Andy Ackerman	Barbie Adler	December 20, 2010	#01009	3.801
After Dave is disappointed that Julia dresses down for him, they both decide to be "perfect 10s" and live it up with a night out. An infestation of bed bugs misleads Amy into thinking that Vance is not ready to commit to her. Rex and Leigh plan an Italian vacation and struggle trying to adjust to the time difference.
2	"Pilot"	Andy Ackerman	Jon Pollack & Scott Silveri	January 20, 2011	#01701	4.152
When Dave and Julia's plans for the perfect anniversary fall through, Rex and Leigh gear up for game night instead. Vance and Amy break up and make up again.
3	"Perfect Proposal"	Andy Ackerman	Jon Pollack & Scott Silveri	January 27, 2011	#01002	3.494
Amy and Vance's engagement inspires doubt from Julia and Dave and blind, overwhelming support from Rex and Leigh.
4	"Perfect Health"	Andy Ackerman	Tad Quill	February 3, 2011	#01005	3.065
Dave and Amy fight their addictions - to food and shopping, respectively - while Rex encourages everyone to embrace immaturity in his Man Cave.
5	"Perfect Jealousy"	Rob Greenberg	Joe Port, Joe Wiseman & John Quaintance	February 10, 2011	#01007	3.06
Amy and Julia object to Dave and Vance's flirtatious ways, while Rex hides a financial secret from Leigh.
6	"Perfect Crime"	Tristram Shapeero	John Quaintance	February 17, 2011	#01003	3.03
Amy asks Leigh to reverse retirement and become her wedding planner but Vance thinks it's the worst idea ever. Everyone gets food poisoned after they ate Leigh's famous summer rolls, but Leigh and Rex think it's stomach flu, not food poisoning. Julia tries to make Dave feel more like a man since he got obsessed with gender roles after attending 'Mad Men' themed party and she asks him to take care of a dead possum in their shed.
7	"Perfect House"	Troy Miller	David Walpert	February 24, 2011	#01008	2.89
Vance persuades Dave to spend more time with him before he marries Amy and they decides to have 'a classic Dave/Vance time' at their client's houses which they are selling, but Amy spoils the fun. Rex and Leigh joins the club mixed doubles tennis tournament but she can't play due to her 'tennis elbow' so Julia steps in as her replacement.
8	"Perfect Job"	Andy Ackerman	John Quaintance	March 17, 2011	#01010	2.88
Amy quits her job at the pet store because she had a crisis of conscience and Leigh decides to become Amy's 'wife' so she could make career plans for her. Julia finally makes some gay friends at work, but gets jealous when Dave starts to hang out with them. Rex gets beaten by Vance at a tiny pool game, but Vance retires as a champion and refuses a rematch.
9	"Perfect Lies"	John Fortenberry	Tad Quill	March 24, 2011	#01011	3.402
Amy's old friend Dottie hijacks Julia's quiet bachelorette party, while Dave's camping trip turns into a wild night at a strip club.
10	"Perfect Exes"	Andy Ackerman	Nick Adams & Jen Kirkman & Lindsey Shockley & Justin Hurwitz	March 31, 2011	#01012	2.05
Vance bonds with Amy's ex-boyfriends, while Dave and Julia have a hard time compromising on last-minute changes to the wedding.
11	"Perfect Wedding"	Andy Ackerman	Jon Pollack & Scott Silveri	April 7, 2011	#01013	2.23
Vance and Amy get cold feet on their wedding day, Rex tries to figure out his role in the wedding while Dave and Julia argue over their toasts.
12	"Perfect Pants"	Fred Savage	Joe Port & Joe Wiseman	Unaired	#01004	TBA
Vance buys a pair of red pants and wears it everywhere to prove a point to Amy, Rex tries to become friends with an influential dentist and Dave & Julia confront each other about the things they hate about each other.
13	"Perfect Daughter"	Troy Miller	David Walpert	Unaired	#01006	TBA
Rex and Julia divide up their mom's stuff which includes a piano. Leigh wants the piano at her place resulting in Julia stealing the piano and hosting all future parties at their place. Amy thinks Vance is cheating on her.

== Reception ==
On December 20, 2010, NBC aired a sneak preview of the series after the season finale of the reality show The Sing-Off. The series received mixed reviews, scoring a 43 out of 100 based on 19 critics on Metacritic. Entertainment Weekly critic Ken Tucker said the show has improved since the first episodes.

The show was the lowest rated scripted series on NBC, with about 3 million viewers on average, until it was replaced by The Paul Reiser Show, which fared even worse.
