= Mid-season replacement =

TV program introduced in second half of schedule

In American network television scheduling, a mid-season replacement is a television show that premieres in the second half of the traditional television season, usually between December and May. Mid-season replacements usually take place after a show that was in the fall schedule was canceled or put on hiatus, outside factors such as an actor's family emergency or personal illness led to a delay in the program's debut, a program was deliberately scheduled for mid-season (for example, shows NBC airs on Sunday nights after the NFL season ends, as it only takes up the first half of the television season), or a program had a shortened season for some other reason which resulted in a time slot that needed filling. A few shows in American television history have been perennial mid-season replacements. For example, American Idol aired from January to May each year from its second season onward, to great ratings success. CBS put reruns of the first season of Land of the Lost (1974) on its Saturday morning schedule in June 1985 (running to the end of December) and June 1987 (running until the new season began in September).

An older and related concept is the summer replacement, which debuts between May and August, when a network's fall schedule is on hiatus. Summer replacements tend to be lower-profile shows with either low budgets or minimal prospects for renewal.

== Notable mid-season replacement shows ==
Series	Original network	Original air date	Series replaced
24: Live Another Day	Fox	May 5, 2014	The Following
3rd Rock from the Sun	NBC	January 9, 1996	NewsRadio
9-1-1	FOX	January 3, 2018	Star
A.P. Bio	NBC	February 1, 2018	The Good Place
Airwolf	CBS	January 22, 1984	Hour #1 of The CBS Saturday Night Movies
Alcatraz	Fox	January 16, 2012	Terra Nova
Alex, Inc.	ABC	March 28, 2018	Speechless
Allegiance	NBC	February 5, 2015	Parenthood
All in the Family	CBS	January 12, 1971	To Rome with Love
American Dad!	Fox	February 6, 2005	The Sketch Show
America's Funniest Home Videos	ABC	January 14, 1990 (original pilot: November 26, 1989)	Free Spirit
Andy Richter Controls the Universe	Fox	March 19, 2002	That '70s Show
Are You There, Chelsea?	NBC	January 11, 2012	Free Agents
Awake	NBC	March 1, 2012	The Firm
B.A.D. Cats	ABC	January 4, 1980	Fantasy Island
Barnaby Jones	CBS	January 28, 1973	Mannix
Barney Miller	ABC	January 23, 1975	The Odd Couple
Batman	ABC	January 12, 1966	The Adventures of Ozzie and Harriet
Baretta	ABC	January 17, 1975	Kung Fu
The Bionic Woman	ABC	January 14, 1976	When Things Were Rotten
The Black Donnellys	NBC	February 26, 2007	Studio 60 on the Sunset Strip
Blind Justice	ABC	March 8, 2005	NYPD Blue
Blossom	NBC	January 3, 1991	Ferris Bueller
Bob's Burgers	Fox	January 9, 2011	The Cleveland Show
Body of Proof	ABC	March 29, 2011	Detroit 1-8-7
Boston Common	NBC	March 21, 1996	The Single Guy
The Book of Daniel	NBC	January 6, 2006	Inconceivable
Breaking In	Fox	April 6, 2011	American Idol
Brooklyn Nine-Nine Season 6 relaunch on NBC	NBC	January 10, 2019	I Feel Bad
Buffy the Vampire Slayer	The WB	March 10, 1997	Savannah
CHAOS	CBS	April 1, 2011	The Defenders
The Cape	NBC	January 9, 2011	The Event
Castle	ABC	March 9, 2009	True Beauty
The Catch	ABC	March 24, 2016	How to Get Away with Murder
Champions	NBC	March 8, 2018	Great News
The Chicago Code	Fox	February 7, 2011	Lie to Me
City of Angels	CBS	January 16, 2000	Cosby
Coach	ABC	February 28, 1989	The Wonder Years
Conviction	NBC	March 3, 2006	The Book of Daniel
Criminal Minds: Suspect Behavior	CBS	February 16, 2011	Blue Bloods
Cuts	UPN	February 14, 2005	Second Time Around
D.C.	The WB	April 2, 2000	Felicity
Daddio	NBC	March 23, 2000	Jesse
Daktari	CBS	January 11, 1966	Rawhide
Dallas	CBS	April 2, 1978	The Carol Burnett Show
Dawson's Creek	The WB	January 20, 1998	Syndicated programming
Deception	NBC	January 7, 2013	Revolution
Dr. Quinn Medicine Woman	CBS	January 1, 1993	Brooklyn Bridge
Dollhouse	Fox	February 13, 2009	Don't Forget the Lyrics!
Do No Harm	NBC	January 31, 2013	Rock Center with Brian Williams
Don't Trust the B— in Apartment 23	ABC	April 11, 2012	Happy Endings
Dynasty	ABC	January 12, 1981	Monday Night Football
Eight Is Enough	ABC	March 15, 1977	Rich Man, Poor Man: Book II
Ellen	ABC	March 29, 1994	Grace Under Fire
Emergency!	NBC	January 15, 1972	The Good Life
Empire	Fox	January 7, 2015	Red Band Society
Falcon Crest	CBS	December 4, 1981	The Incredible Hulk
Fam	CBS	January 10, 2019	Murphy Brown
Family Guy	Fox	January 31, 1999	The X-Files
Fangbone!	Disney XD	July 5, 2016	Counterfeit Cat
Fashion Star	NBC	March 13, 2012	Parenthood
The Firm	NBC	January 8, 2012	Prime Suspect
The Following	Fox	January 21, 2013	The Mob Doctor
For the People	CBS	January 31, 1965	My Living Doll
For Life	ABC	February 11, 2020	Emergence
For Your Love	NBC	March 17, 1998	NewsRadio
Fresh Off the Boat	ABC	February 4, 2015	Selfie
Friends with Benefits	NBC	August 5, 2011	
Futurama	FOX	March 28, 1999	That '70s Show
Getting By	ABC	March 5, 1993	Dinosaurs
George Lopez	ABC	March 27, 2002	According to Jim
Good Advice	CBS	April 2, 1993	Bob
Grapevine (2000 revival)	CBS	February 28, 2000	Ladies Man
Great News	NBC	April 25, 2017	Trial & Error
Grey's Anatomy	ABC	March 27, 2005	Boston Legal
Grounded for Life	Fox	January 10, 2001	Normal, Ohio
Happy Days	ABC	January 15, 1974	Temperatures Rising
Hannibal	NBC	April 4, 2013	Do No Harm
Happy Endings	ABC	April 13, 2011	Mr. Sunshine
Harry's Law	NBC	January 17, 2011	Chase
High Incident	ABC	March 4, 1996	Monday Night Football
Hill Street Blues	NBC	January 15, 1981	NBC Saturday Night at the Movies
Homicide: Life on the Street	NBC	January 31, 1993	Seinfeld
Human Target	Fox	January 17, 2010	So You Think You Can Dance
Imaginary Mary	ABC	March 29, 2017	The Real O'Neals
The Incredible Hulk	CBS	March 10, 1978	The CBS Friday Night Movies
In Case of Emergency	ABC	January 3, 2007	
It Takes a Thief	ABC	January 9, 1968	
In the Heat of the Night	NBC	March 6, 1988	J.J. Starbuck
The Jeffersons	CBS	January 18, 1975	Friends and Lovers
JAG Season 2 relaunch on CBS	CBS	January 17, 1997	Mr. & Mrs. Smith
Just Shoot Me!	NBC	March 4, 1997	Men Behaving Badly
Kate & Allie	CBS	March 19, 1984	AfterMASH
Kate Brasher	CBS	February 24, 2001	Walker, Texas Ranger
King of the Hill	Fox	January 12, 1997	Ned and Stacey
Knots Landing	CBS	December 27, 1979	Hawaii Five-O
LA to Vegas	Fox	January 2, 2018	Brooklyn Nine-Nine
LateLine	NBC	March 17, 1998	Just Shoot Me!
Laverne & Shirley	ABC	January 27, 1976	Welcome Back, Kotter
Law & Order: Trial by Jury	NBC	March 3, 2005	Medical Investigation
Living Biblically	CBS	February 26, 2018	9JKL
Mad Love	CBS	February 14, 2011	Rules of Engagement
Malcolm in the Middle	Fox	January 9, 2000	Futurama
Making History	Fox	March 5, 2017	Son of Zorn
Man from Interpol	NBC	January 30, 1960	It Could Be You
Married... with Children	Fox	April 5, 1987	Syndicated programming
Medium	NBC	January 3, 2005	LAX
The Mick	Fox	January 1, 2017	Brooklyn Nine-Nine
The Millionaire	CBS	January 19, 1955	Strike It Rich
Moesha	UPN	January 23, 1996	Deadly Games
Miss Guided	ABC	March 18, 2008	
Moonlighting	ABC	March 3, 1985	
Mr. Belvedere	ABC	March 15, 1985	Webster
Mr. Sunshine	ABC	February 9, 2011	Cougar Town
My Wife and Kids	ABC	March 28, 2001	Who Wants to Be a Millionaire?
Nanny and the Professor	ABC	January 21, 1970	The Flying Nun
Napoleon Dynamite	Fox	January 15, 2012	Allen Gregory
Nash Bridges	CBS	March 29, 1996	American Gothic
The Nick Cannon Show	Nickelodeon	January 12, 2002	The Brothers Garcia
Night Court	NBC	January 4, 1984	Family Ties
The Norm Show	ABC	March 24, 1999	The Secret Lives of Men
Notes from the Underbelly	ABC	April 12, 2007	George Lopez
Numb3rs	CBS	January 23, 2005	Dr. Vegas
NYC 22	CBS	April 15, 2012	CSI: Miami
The Odd Couple	CBS	February 19, 2015	Two and a Half Men
Parenthood	NBC	March 2, 2010	The Jay Leno Show
Parks and Recreation (Note: Parks and Recreation was a mid-season replacement in its first, third, and seventh seasons. It was introduced as a mid-season replacement in the third season, to accommodate Amy Poehler's pregnancy, which was not written into the show. It was used as a mid-season replacement in its season finale to meet contractual obligations.)	NBC	April 9, 2009	Kath & Kim
Perfect Couples	NBC	December 20, 2010	
Perfect Strangers	ABC	March 25, 1986	Growing Pains
The PJs	FOX	January 10, 1999	Costello
Quantum Leap	NBC	March 26, 1989	
Raines	NBC	March 15, 2007	ER
Ready for Love	NBC	April 9, 2013	Smash
The Real O'Neals	ABC	March 2, 2016	The Muppets
Red Widow	ABC	March 3, 2013	666 Park Avenue
Rob	CBS	January 12, 2012	Rules of Engagement
Roseanne (revival)	ABC	March 27, 2018	Fresh Off the Boat
Rules of Engagement	CBS	February 5, 2007	The New Adventures of Old Christine
Sanford and Son	NBC	January 14, 1972	The D.A.
Schoolhouse Rock!	ABC	January 15, 1973	commercials
Scrubs	ABC	January 6, 2009 (network change for Season 8)	According to Jim
Scrubs	ABC	February 25, 2026 (continuation series)	Shifting Gears
Social Studies	UPN	March 18, 1997	Homeboys in Outer Space
Some of My Best Friends	CBS	February 28, 2001	Welcome to New York
SpongeBob SquarePants	Nickelodeon	May 1, 1999	First hour of Nick at Nite
Station 19	ABC	March 22, 2018	How to Get Away with Murder
Superior Donuts	CBS	February 2, 2017	The Odd Couple
Scandal	ABC	April 5, 2012	Private Practice
Schooled	ABC	January 9, 2019	American Housewife
Show Me the Money	ABC	November 15, 2006	
The Simpsons	Fox	December 17, 1989	Totally Hidden Video
Sister, Sister	ABC	April 1, 1994	Hangin' with Mr. Cooper (interim)
The Six Million Dollar Man	ABC	January 18, 1974	Room 222
Smash	NBC	February 6, 2012	Rock Center with Brian Williams
Southland	NBC	April 9, 2009	ER
Space Cases	Nickelodeon	March 2, 1996	All That
Splitting Up Together	ABC	March 27, 2018	The Mayor
Stacked	Fox	April 13, 2005	Quintuplets
Station Zero	MTV	March 8, 1999	
Terminator: The Sarah Connor Chronicles	Fox	January 13, 2008	K-Ville
That '80s Show	Fox	January 23, 2002	Malcolm in the Middle
The Bob Cummings Show	NBC	January 2, 1955	The Hunter
The Bridge	CTV	March 5, 2010	
The Carrie Diaries	The CW	January 14, 2013	90210
The Deep End	ABC	January 21, 2010	FlashForward
The Enemy Within	NBC	February 25, 2019	Manifest
The Finder	Fox	January 12, 2012	Bones
The Knights of Prosperity	ABC	January 3, 2007	
The Lone Gunmen	Fox	March 4, 2001	FreakyLinks
The New Adventures of Old Christine	CBS	March 13, 2006	Courting Alex
The Oblongs	The WB	April 1, 2001	For Your Love
The Office	NBC	March 24, 2005	Committed
The Others	NBC	February 5, 2000	Freaks and Geeks
The Practice	ABC	March 4, 1997	NYPD Blue
The Return of Jezebel James	Fox	March 14, 2008	
The River	ABC	February 7, 2012	Wife Swap
Three Sisters	NBC	January 9, 2001	DAG
Thunder Alley	ABC	March 9, 1994	The Critic
Titus	Fox	March 20, 2000	Time of Your Life
Twenty-One (2000 revival)	NBC	January 9, 2000	Third Watch
Twin Peaks	ABC	April 8, 1990	The Young Riders
The Outsiders	Fox	March 25, 1990	Booker
The Unit	CBS	March 7, 2006	Love Monkey
The Unusuals	ABC	April 8, 2009	Life on Mars
The Village	NBC	March 19, 2019	New Amsterdam
The Wonder Years	ABC	January 31, 1988	Growing Pains
Three	The WB	February 2, 1998	Buffy the Vampire Slayer
Three's Company	ABC	March 15, 1977	The Tony Randall Show
Traffic Light	Fox	February 8, 2011	Raising Hope, Running Wilde
Trial & Error	NBC	March 14, 2017	This Is Us
Unhappily Ever After	The WB	January 11, 1995	Syndicated programming
Walker, Texas Ranger	CBS	April 21, 1993	The Hat Squad
Wanda at Large	Fox	March 26, 2003	Cedric the Entertainer Presents
Watching Ellie	NBC	February 26, 2002	Three Sisters
What About Brian	ABC	April 16, 2006	Miracle Workers
Work It	ABC	January 3, 2012	Man Up
Zoe, Duncan, Jack and Jane	The WB	January 17, 1999	Unhappily Ever After
Zero Hour	ABC	February 14, 2013	Last Resort
