= Go On (TV series) =

American comedy television series

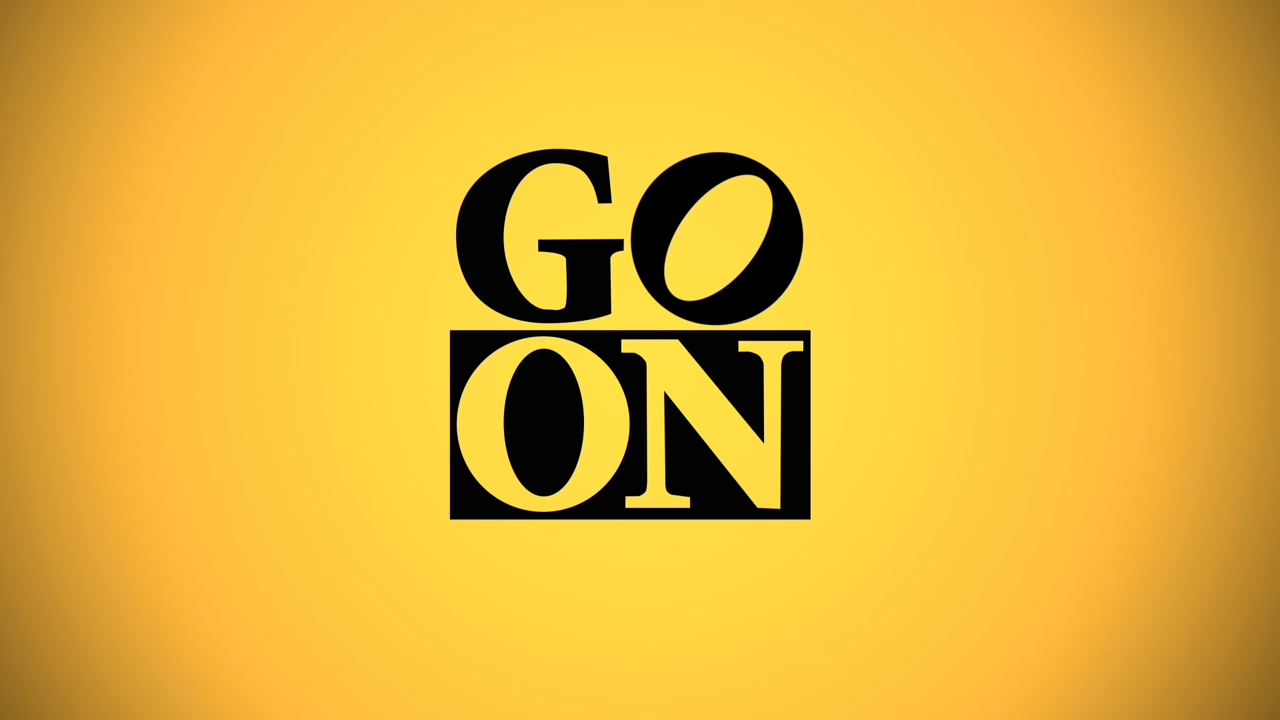
- Genre: Sitcom
- Created by: Scott Silveri
- Starring: Matthew Perry; Laura Benanti; Julie White; Suzy Nakamura; Tyler James Williams; Brett Gelman; Sarah Baker; John Cho
- Opening theme: "Moves" by The New Pornographers (in the occasionally seen extended opening only)
- Composer: John Swihart
- Country of origin: United States
- Original language: English
- No. of seasons: 1
- No. of episodes: 22

Production
- Executive producers: Scott Silveri; Matthew Perry; Todd Holland; Karey Burke; Jon Pollack
- Cinematography: Edward J. Pei
- Editors: Daniel Gabbe; Pamela March
- Camera setup: Single-camera
- Running time: 21–23 minutes
- Production companies: Silver & Gold Productions; Dark Toy Entertainment; Universal Television; Open 4 Business Productions

Original release
- Network: NBC
- Release: August 8, 2012 – April 11, 2013

Go On is an American television sitcom created by Scott Silveri, that aired on NBC from August 8, 2012, to April 11, 2013. The series starred Matthew Perry as Ryan King, a sports talk radio host trying to move on from the death of his wife. It was given a series order on April 20, 2012. A preview episode aired following the Olympics coverage on August 8. The series premiered on September 11, 2012, in its normal Tuesday timeslot at 9:00 pm Eastern/8:00 pm Central after The Voice.

On April 20, 2012, NBC ordered a full season of Go On to contain 22 episodes, ahead of the series premiere. On May 10, 2013, NBC cancelled the series after one season.

== Cast and characters ==
=== Main cast ===
- Matthew Perry as Ryan King, a sports talk radio host who joins a support group while trying to move on from his late wife's death.
- Laura Benanti as Lauren Bennett, the group's poorly trained leader. She fancies herself "in charge" of the group's emotional well-being.
- Julie White as Anne, a lesbian prosecutor coping with the death of her partner, and stuck in the "anger" stage of grief.
- Suzy Nakamura as Yolanda Mitsawa, an anesthesiologist whose fiancé left her, and who feels that everything is "too sexual", including jazz and cats that continuously rub against her.
- Tyler James Williams as Owen Lewis, whose brother is in a coma following a skiing accident. He is extremely shy in the beginning, though he has come out of his shell quite a bit since Ryan has joined the group.
- Brett Gelman as "Mr. K.", a mysterious member whose first name is Benjamin and who designed NASA's Mars Curiosity rover's sampling arm, coping with grief that the others are too afraid to ask him about.
- Sarah Baker as Sonia (episode 14 onwards; previously recurring), a member of the group, who is grieving over the death of her cat, Cinderella.
- John Cho as Steven, Ryan's boss and best friend, who forces him to seek counseling.

=== Recurring cast ===
- Allison Miller as Carrie, Ryan's assistant, who has a crush on Ryan. The penultimate episode of the series reveals that these feelings are mutual, and Carrie quits her job so that she and Ryan are free to carry out a relationship.
- Tonita Castro as Fausta, a member of the group, who is grieving the death of her father and brother.
- Seth Morris as Danny, a member of the group, a discharged soldier whose wife had a son with another man while he was on deployment.
- Bill Cobbs as George, a member of the group who is blind.
- Christine Woods as Janie King, Ryan's deceased wife who died in a car crash due to texting while driving.
- Hayes MacArthur as Wyatt Achenbach, Lauren's chiropractor fiancé.
- Piper Perabo as Simone, a popular, former member of the support group, who was dealing with an injury that made her unable to work in her dancing career. She is disliked by Lauren, and develops a romantic relationship with Ryan.
- Terrell Owens as himself. In the first episode, he was Ryan's first guest after he returned from his bereavement leave. In later episodes, he became Ryan's assistant at KBAL.

== Episodes ==
No. overall	No. in series	Title	Directed by	Written by	Original release date	Prod. code	U.S. viewers (millions)
1	1	"Pilot"	Todd Holland	Scott Silveri	August 8, 2012	101	16.10
Ryan King is a sports talk radio host who thinks he is ready to get back to work after the death of his wife. Ryan reluctantly attends a grief support group his boss Steven insisted upon. Ryan's decision to come back to work early proves to be disastrous and he realizes that maybe group therapy is what he needs right now.
2	2	"He Got Game, She Got Cats"	Andy Ackerman	Lesley Wake Webster	September 11, 2012	102	9.73
Ryan encourages the group members to take action, starting with Sonia dumping her boyfriend Jason and getting another cat, "Fuzzy Jason," which triggers her cat-owning compulsion. George is devastated to learn his historic signed basketball is missing from its display case. And Ryan invades his personal assistant Carrie's personal time.
3	3	"There's No 'Ryan' In Team"	Todd Holland	Scott Silveri	September 18, 2012	103	9.28
Ryan upsets the group by ignoring them in front of his colleagues, though Steven sees he is making progress and encourages Ryan to socialize with the group, who all support Ryan for his 1:23 am flinch and a ceremony provided by his gardener.
4	4	"Bench-Clearing Bawl"	Jamie Babbit	Liz Brixius	September 25, 2012	104	6.90
Ryan has been trying to get into Jeremy Roenick's hockey games for years, but when Steven plays the dead-wife card to get an invitation Ryan doesn't know it is a sympathy gesture. Ryan agrees to help Anne by being her 'plus one' to a lesbian wedding. And Ryan has a breakdown after giving away Janie's sewing machine.
5	5	"Do You Believe in Ghosts...Yes!"	Michael Engler	Mathew Harawitz	October 2, 2012	105	5.82
Ryan hallucinates his dead wife Janie at home, prompting him to take better care of himself. Learning that Steven was dumped a month ago, Ryan determines to be his wingman but they have more fun just hanging out as friends. The group discover that Lauren has test anxiety and support her in taking the real estate agent exam.
6	6	"Big League Chew"	Millicent Shelton	Dennis McNicholas	October 9, 2012	106	6.65
Ryan is in denial about his compulsive eating to deal with grief. Ryan tries to help Danny let go of the fantasy world he has created in his mind to escape to when reality is too difficult to confront.
7	7	"Any Given Birthday"	Kevin Dowling	Jon Pollack & Scott Silveri	October 23, 2012	107	6.12
Ryan has never enjoyed his birthday even though Janie would often try to make them special for him. To try to help Ryan with his first birthday since the death of his wife Yolanda sets up a scavenger hunt based on Ryan's life for the group to participate in. Ryan agrees to let Sonia look after Steven who is recovering from a colonoscopy. Anne and Mr K discover a common passion for musicals.
8	8	"Videogame, Set, Match"	Todd Holland	Lesley Wake Webster	November 13, 2012	108	6.09
Ryan tries to take Owen under his wing but Owen's mother isn't certain Ryan is actually helping. Yolanda announces that she is ready to graduate from the group but changes her mind at the ceremony though she goes through with it because of the peer pressure to ensure Lauren doesn't see herself as a failure.
9	9	"Dinner Takes All"	Ken Whittingham	Story by : Liz Brixius; Teleplay by : Lesley Wake Webster	November 20, 2012	110	6.20
When Amy (Lauren Graham) pays a visit to her old college friends Ryan and Steven, the guys unexpectedly begin to compete for her affection. Meanwhile, Ryan invites the support group to the K-Bal offices for Thanksgiving, Lauren's qualifications are tested by Owen's mom and Anne's kids meet Ryan for the first time.
10	10	"Back, Back, Back... It's Gone"	Todd Holland	Dennis McNicholas	November 27, 2012	111	6.06
When Ryan decides it's time to start dating again, Misty May-Treanor offers to help and invites him to play in a game of beach volleyball with her friends. Elsewhere, George outlives his doctors' predicted life expectancy for him and is ready to celebrate, and Danny develops feelings for Sonia.
11	11	"The World Ain't Over 'Till It's Over"	Kevin Dowling	Story by : Seth Raab & Nicholas Darrow & Matthew Perry; Teleplay by : Mathew Harawitz	December 4, 2012	112	6.67
When the group settles on a date for their holiday party, it happens to fall on what Mr. K believes will be the end of the world. Ryan invites Anne along on his annual trip to wine country with Steven and Lauren worries her boyfriend is ready to pop the question.
12	12	"Win at All Costas"	Michael Lehmann	Story by : Mathew Harawitz; Teleplay by : Seth Raab & Nicholas Darrow	January 8, 2013	109	4.29
When Ryan is offered an audition with his idol Bob Costas, Mr K. finds a new purpose in life.
13	13	"Gooooaaaallll Doll!"	Todd Holland	Lesley Wake Webster	January 15, 2013	113	4.45
Ryan decides to go back to dating. And get an unexpected competition with Shaun White by a woman Hannah (Nazanin Boniadi).
14	14	"Comeback Player of the Year"	Eric Appel	Jon Pollack & Scott Silveri	January 22, 2013	114	3.97
When Simone (Piper Perabo) - a former member of the group - returns seeking help, Ryan feels threatened and worried about his importance within the group.
15	15	"Pass Interference"	Jamie Babbit	Mathew Harawitz & Lesley Wake Webster	January 29, 2013	115	3.95
After Ryan starts dating Simone, he is distracted by Janie's ghost who starts re-appearing during his & Simone's intimate moments. Meanwhile, the rest of the group decides to buy Lauren a wedding dress whilst relying on Owen to act as her body double.
16	16	"Go Deep"	Linda Mendoza	Mathew Harawitz & Lesley Wake Webster	February 19, 2013	116	3.30
Terrell Owens gets a temp job at K-Bal. Ryan, Simone & Mr. K go on a meditation retreat.
17	17	"Ring and a Miss"	Todd Holland	Bill Callahan & Dennis McNicholas	February 26, 2013	117	3.17
Ryan asks Simone to move in with him, although he finds it difficult to uphold her request to detach himself from his wedding ring.
18	18	"Double Down"	Michael Lehmann	Seth Raab & Nicholas Darrow	March 5, 2013	118	3.07
Janie's life insurance check arrives. Ryan starts gambling again after Fausta takes him to a church bingo game. Ryan involves the rest of the group in his gambling addiction to the disapproval of Lauren. Anne dates a book store salesperson named Brittney (Annie Heise).
19	19	"Go for the Gold Watch"	Todd Holland	Story by : Dennis McNicholas; Teleplay by : Bill Callahan & Mathew Harawitz	March 19, 2013	119	2.87
Ryan overtakes El Mandril in the ratings as the top radio show in LA but the success doesn't bring him happiness. Danny's divorce papers come through, and seeing an opportunity to help a friend as well as internal happiness, Ryan tries to pair Danny up with Sonia. Mr. K's compatibility algorithm for truesoulm8.com calculates that Lauren and Steven are a 99% match. Owen and Anne team up to find more about Mr. K's background and discover that he failed the read-through for the role of Wesley on Mr. Belvedere.
20	20	"Matchup Problems"	Beth McCarthy-Miller	Story by : Bill Callahan; Teleplay by : Jon Pollack & Scott Silveri	March 26, 2013	120	5.12
Anne and Ryan compete for the affection of a widow, Talia (Courteney Cox). Yolanda goes on an Asian Christian Singles Cruise but isn't having much luck, so Lauren, via webcam, offers to be her wingman.
21	21	"Fast Breakup"	Eric Appel	Lesley Wake Webster & Matthew Harawitz	April 4, 2013	121	2.45
Discovering that Carrie has a crush on him, Ryan uses the K-BAL's mascot suit to avoid talking to her. The women of the group, along with Mr. K, throw Lauren a bachelorette party. Ryan tries to help Lauren break up with Wyatt but is swayed by Wyatt's charms and ends up singing with him and breaking bread. Carrie quits K-BAL in order to remove any conflict of a potential workplace relationship between herself and Ryan.
22	22	"Urn-ed Run"	Linda Mendoza	Story by : Bill Callahan; Teleplay by : Jon Pollack & Scott Silveri	April 11, 2013	122	2.67
Ryan spreads Janie's ashes at a bridge as Steven sings "I Got Shoes". Mr. K digs into it and reveals that Ryan actually spread pancake mix. The group admits that they have not progressed much in their respective issues and blame Lauren's ineffectiveness. Sonia and Yolanda take pity on Lauren and create a fake deceased patient to grieve over. Mr. K and Anne steal Janie's ashes, intending to scatter them at the bridge, but after a confrontation at a gas station the urn breaks. Ryan is upset by the location but Lauren helps him understand that Janie never wanted something perfect and extravagant, a callback to the flashbacks of Ryan & Janie's wedding, but something personal. In the end, Ryan ends up scattering the remains of Janie's ashes at a batting cage, where he took her to get away from the stress of the wedding.

== Webisodes ==
On Go On's YouTube channel and official website, it previously featured a series of webisodes called Ask Lauren. They were short clips with Lauren and the group in therapy sessions that did not appear in original series. However, the videos are no longer available to the public.

- Ask Lauren: Siblings - Go On: Lauren and members of the group reach out and try to help others.
- Ask Lauren: Get Over It - Go On: Ann and Sonia go head-to-head over a question of grief management.
- Ask Lauren: Curse - Go On: Danny, Mr. K and Owen help Lauren field a question from Jeff.
- Ask Lauren: Uptight - Go On: Lauren gets musical to prove that she's not at all uptight!
- Ask Lauren: Behind the Scenes - Go On: What's it like to make a webisode? Go On's cast tells all!

== Development and production ==
NBC ordered Go On to pilot in January 2012. Matthew Perry was announced as the series' lead actor on March 1. Creator Scott Silveri, who worked with Perry on Friends, claims he subconsciously wrote the part for him.

On April 20, 2012, the pilot became the first of the 2012–13 American television season to gain a series order of thirteen episodes. Go On aired its pilot on August 8, 2012, during the 2012 Summer Olympics, as a "sneak preview", and was picked up for a full season of twenty-two episodes, on October 2, 2012. Episode eight was originally scheduled for October 30, 2012, but was pre-empted by coverage of Hurricane Sandy. The last two episodes were aired on Thursday unlike the other episodes which aired on Tuesday.

== Post-airing ==
In July 2023, the creator Scott Silveri talked about the series upon learning about the DVD release 11 years later. He said, "It was such a fun show to do. There were so many great people involved in it. I keep in touch with a couple of them; Julie White, I talk to from time to time. Matthew, I talked to far too infrequently. But if all I get out of it is a little trip down memory lane for me, great. And if it could be introduced to a couple more people…I do feel like it’s one of those shows that…if you could get those numbers now it would run for 30 years. And you can play that game with so many different shows from back then.” Silveri was also open to returning to the show if there was an opportunity. He remarked, “If they want to get the band back together, have NBC or literally anyone else call me—I’ll do it...I’ll do it on network. I’ll do it on streaming. I’ll do it in the parking lot of Bob’s Big Boy, whatever they want.”

== Reception ==
=== Critical ===
The series has received favorable reviews from critics. It holds a Metacritic score of 66/100, indicating "generally favorable" reviews. Verne Gay of Newsday gave the show a 5 star rating, noting, "The cast is good, even excellent. But Perry's the one who sells Go On." David Hinckley of the New York Daily News described the show as "Maybe the best new sitcom of the fall." Hank Stuever of the Washington Post praised the directing of the show, observing, "Go On moves quite breezily--much like an NBC-flavored take on premium cable dramadies such as The Big C and Enlightened. It's not as good as either of those, but it has the same happy-sad aura, with just a dash of Community-like absurdity to keep the speed limit up."

Several critics mentioned the show's resemblance to fellow NBC sitcom Community. Emily VanDerWerff of The A.V. Club said, "The show's weird similarities to Community distract". Alan Sepinwall of Hitfix called the show "Community with Chandler Bing instead of the guy from The Soup." James Poniewozik of Time described its premise as being "as much as possible like Community's without actually being Community".

=== Ratings ===
Season	Timeslot (ET)	# Ep.	Premiered		Ended		TV Season	Rank	Viewers (in millions)
Season	Timeslot (ET)	# Ep.	Date	Premiere Viewers (in millions)	Date	Finale Viewers (in millions)	TV Season	Rank	Viewers (in millions)
1	Wednesday 11:04 pm (Premiere); Tuesday 9:00 pm (Episodes 2 – 20); Thursday 9:30 pm (Episodes 21 – 22)	22	August 8, 2012	16.10	April 11, 2013	2.67	2012–13	#74	6.2

== Release ==
=== Broadcast ===
The series aired NBC in the U.S. and was simulcast on Global in Canada.

=== Home media ===
Go On is available to stream on Peacock and Vudu. It is also on video on demand through YouTube, Google Play, Apple TV, and Amazon Prime Video. It previously streamed on the NBC website and Roku Channel. A DVD was made available for Go On - The Complete Series on May 23, 2023, from Mill Creek Entertainment.

== Awards ==
2013:

- Nominated: People's Choice Awards - Favorite New TV Comedy
- Nominated: GLAAD Media Awards - Outstanding Comedy Series
- Nominated: Image Awards (NAACP) - Outstanding Directing in a Comedy Series - Millicent Shelton - For episode "Big League Chew"
- Won: Gracie Allen Awards - Outstanding Female Actor in a Supporting Role in a Comedy Series - Julie White
