= Joey (TV series) =

American sitcom

- Genre: Sitcom
- Created by: Scott Silveri; Shana Goldberg-Meehan
- Based on: Joey Tribbiani by: David Crane; Marta Kauffman
- Starring: Matt LeBlanc; Andrea Anders; Paulo Costanzo; Jennifer Coolidge; Drea de Matteo; Miguel A. Núñez Jr.
- Opening theme: "Sunny Hours" by Long Beach Dub Allstars (featuring will.i.am)
- Country of origin: United States
- Original language: English
- No. of seasons: 2
- No. of episodes: 46

Production
- Executive producers: Kevin S. Bright; Scott Silveri; Shana Goldberg-Meehan
- Running time: 20–24 minutes
- Production companies: Bright-San Productions; Silver & Gold Productions; Warner Bros. Television

Original release
- Network: NBC
- Release: September 9, 2004 – August 23, 2006

Joey is an American sitcom created by Scott Silveri and Shana Goldberg-Meehan. It is a spin-off sequel to Friends, with Matt LeBlanc reprising his role as Joey Tribbiani. It premiered on NBC on September 9, 2004. Midway through the second season, the show was placed on hiatus but returned on March 7, 2006. Only one more episode aired on NBC, before the show was canceled due to low ratings in May 2006. However, the final eight episodes were released in various international markets before Warner Bros. Television Studios released them on the Friends YouTube channel in 2025.

== Overview ==
After the events of Friends, Joey Tribbiani has struck out on his own and moved to Hollywood, hoping to truly make it as an actor. After reuniting with his high-strung sister, Gina, a hairdresser, Joey moves in with his genius twenty-year-old nephew Michael, who is a rocket scientist. He begins a tentative romance with his superintendent, Alexis Garrett, and becomes close friends with fellow aspiring actor Zach Miller.

== Cast and characters ==
- Matt LeBlanc as Joey Tribbiani, a struggling actor and food lover who becomes famous for his role on Days of Our Lives as Dr. Drake Ramoray. Joey is a womanizer with many girlfriends throughout the series, in keeping with his character on Friends. The series roughly picks up where Friends left off, with Joey at the beginning of the show making a move from New York to Los Angeles to proceed with his acting career. He is constantly talking about food or eating sandwiches or pizza.
- Drea de Matteo as Gina Tribbiani, Joey's older sister, who is temperamental and promiscuous. Gina is not too bright, yet very street-wise; she is a caring but over-protective and domineering mother. For years, she convinced her genius son, Michael, that he was born when she was 22 instead of sixteen years old, and always says he is the one thing she has done well. She and Joey are friends in addition to being siblings, both having the gift of being extremely appealing to the opposite sex, with numerous lovers. Initially working as a hairdresser, by season two, she works as a secretary for Joey's agent, Bobbie, having impressed Bobbie with her brash manner. In season two, she starts dating Michael's father, Jimmy, once again. In the season-two episode "Joey and the Holding Hands", it is implied that Gina may be bisexual.
- Andrea Anders as Alexis "Alex" Garrett, Joey's next-door neighbor, landlady, and friend. She is an educated, yet slightly ditzy, blonde lawyer who graduated from Northwestern University and Pepperdine University School of Law. Initially intimidated but also intrigued by Joey's tough street-wise older sister, Gina, the two women eventually become friends and she becomes bolder in the way she dresses and acts, thanks to Gina's influence. She is puzzled but impressed by Joey's intuitive gift of knowing when she is wearing thong panties and spends most of her time hanging out at Joey and Michael's apartment. She and Joey bond and become close friends. Her husband is a professional orchestra musician and is away from home most of the time, and she confides her problems with her marriage in Joey. At the end of season one, she and Joey become romantically involved during her separation from her husband. In season two, she becomes romantically interested in Joey and has a crush on him for a long period. Gina tries to help her get over Joey, but once Alex starts dating Joey's friend Dean, Joey soon realizes that he is also in love with Alex. Shortly after the series ended, Anders and LeBlanc entered a relationship for nine years.
- Paulo Costanzo as Michael Tribbiani, Joey's nephew, who idolizes Joey's ability to date many women and who himself is sheltered and nervous around girls. He is self-conscious that he has been so sheltered and that his mother, Gina, breastfed him until he was seven. He is a huge Star Trek: The Next Generation and Star Wars fan. He is extremely intelligent, an aerospace engineer, attends Caltech, and specialises in applied thermodynamics. He works with his rival, Seth, on engineering projects, and is an obvious direct opposite from his more street-wise mother and uncle. He turns to Joey as a big brother and substitute father figure, even after his biological father, Jimmy, re-enters Gina's love life.
- Jennifer Coolidge as Roberta "Bobbie" Morganstern, Joey's agent and the twelfth most powerful woman in Hollywood, according to Entertainment Weekly. She has an enormous crush on Joey's nephew, Michael. She often entertains herself by making her office assistant do funny tricks or shocking herself with a stun-gun. She is brash, forward, aggressive, highly entertaining, and slightly ditzy, laughing at everything and at anyone's expense, including her client Joey's. She was once sued by Phil Collins.
- Miguel A. Núñez Jr. as Zach Miller (season 2), an actor and amateur play director who becomes close friends with Joey. Zach does not appear to have a home; he was seen at one time living in Joey's trailer while working on a major blockbuster movie. In one episode, Zach and Joey, both drunk, get married in Tijuana. Zach's final appearance was in "Joey and the Big Move". Núñez was absent from the last five episodes, including the series finale, because he had found another job.
- Ben Falcone as Howard Peckerman, Joey's friend and neighbor.

Several cast members had previously appeared as different characters in Friends: Coolidge appeared as Amanda, an old friend of Monica and Phoebe, in a tenth-season episode. Adam Goldberg, who played Jimmy, appeared in the second season of Friends in the recurring role of Eddie, who moves in with Chandler after Joey moves out. Carlos Gómez, who played Sam the director, appeared in one episode of Friends as the restaurant worker Julio in "The One with All the Jealousy". Patrick Kerr, who played the producer of the Daytime Soap Awards, appeared in one episode of Friends as a restaurant manager who auditions Monica for a job as a chef. Brent Spiner, who played himself, appeared in one episode of Friends as James Campbell, who interviews Rachel for a job.

Additionally, Robert Costanzo reprised his role as Joey's father, Joey Tribbiani Sr., who originated in the first season of Friends, in "Joey and the Dad", making Costanzo the only actor besides LeBlanc to play the same character in both series. Christina Ricci appears as Mary-Therese in "Joey and the Fancy Sister", taking over the role from Mimi Lieber, who (along with Gina, then played by K.J. Steinberg) first appeared in a third-season episode of Friends.

David Schwimmer, who previously portrayed Ross Geller and directed several episodes of Friends, returned to direct two episodes of Joey.

== Background and development ==
After the series finale of Friends in 2004, LeBlanc signed on for the spin-off series, Joey, following Joey's move to Los Angeles to pursue his acting career. Friends producers Marta Kauffman and David Crane were not interested in the spin-off, although Kevin S. Bright agreed to be executive producer, along with Joey creators Scott Silveri and Shana Goldberg-Meehan, the latter of whom left the show after the first season and was replaced by Jon Pollack.

The pilot episode was released in screener for test audiences and members of the entertainment industry to preview the show and drum up business. The screener was subsequently leaked on the internet and thus received a much wider critical review process than initially conceived. There were few differences between the unaired pilot and the version that was broadcast. Ashley Scott played the role of Allison in the unaired pilot but was replaced by Andrea Anders, and the character name changed to Alex. Episode 5 and Episode 13 of season one were directed by David Schwimmer, who played Ross Geller in Friends.

NBC heavily promoted Joey and gave it Friends' Thursday 8:00 pm timeslot. The series did well in the Nielsen ratings in its first season (2004–2005) and was subsequently renewed for a second season (2005–2006). In the second season, Miguel A. Núñez Jr. was added to the show as a series regular and Jennifer Coolidge had a more prominent role. The pilot was watched by 18.6 million American viewers, but ratings continually decreased throughout the series, averaging 10.2 million viewers in the first season and 7.1 million in the second. The show was pulled from its Thursday-night timeslot in December 2005 and NBC returned it in a new timeslot (Tuesdays at 8pm) on March 7, 2006. Due in part to being in competition with American Idol, Joey was the lowest-rated prime time program of the week for NBC. The network pulled the series after the first Tuesday broadcast; the remaining episodes have never been broadcast by NBC but were shown on various other networks around the world. The final broadcast episode, on March 7, 2006, was watched by 4.1 million viewers; NBC canceled the series on May 15, 2006, after two seasons. Bright blamed the collaboration between NBC executives, the studio, and other producers for quickly ruining the series:

On Friends, Joey was a womanizer, but we enjoyed his exploits. He was a solid friend, a guy you knew you could count on. Joey was deconstructed to be a guy who couldn't get a job, couldn't ask a girl out. He became a pathetic, mopey character. I felt he was moving in the wrong direction, but I was not heard.

== Episodes ==
=== Series overview ===
Season	Episodes	Originally released	
Season	Episodes	First released	Last released
1	24	September 9, 2004	May 12, 2005
2	22	September 22, 2005	August 23, 2006

=== Season 1 (2004–05) ===
No. overall	No. in season	Title	Directed by	Written by	Original release date	Prod. code	U.S. viewers (millions)
1	1	"Pilot"	Kevin S. Bright	Shana Goldberg-Meehan & Scott Silveri	September 9, 2004	475246	18.55
When Joey's new TV show is cancelled and the show he turned down is a big hit, it leaves Joey kicking himself and in search of work. Joey's nephew wants to leave his mother's house and live with his cool uncle but is afraid to tell her.
2	2	"Joey and the Student"	Kevin S. Bright	Scott Silveri & Shana Goldberg-Meehan	September 16, 2004	2T5451	15.37
When Joey plans to teach Michael how to pick up women, Gina invites herself along, even though the guys don't want her to come. Joey finds out that Alex is the one who has been placing complaint notes about everything he does and that everyone hates her because of this.
3	3	"Joey and the Party"	Gail Mancuso	Robert Carlock	September 23, 2004	2T5453	14.87
Joey and Michael plan a party, with the hopes that Joey makes a new friend. Michael's college rival announces he'll be showing up with his girlfriend. Michael tries to compete by enlisting the help of Alex to play his fake girlfriend. Guest star: Jayma Mays as Molly and Simon Helberg as Seth.
4	4	"Joey and the Book Club"	Andrew D. Weyman	John Quaintance	September 30, 2004	2T5455	13.59
To woo a girl in his book club, Michael assigns a romantic novel to the group. However, when he tries to make his move, he finds out that she is already in love with Joey. Gina makes a deal with Alex in order to get more work.
5	5	"Joey and the Perfect Storm"	David Schwimmer	Vanessa McCarthy	October 7, 2004	2T5456	12.83
When Joey gets the job of understudying in three different plays, it leaves him in a tight spot when all three main actors call in sick. Meanwhile, there is a vacant apartment in the complex and Joey, Michael, and Alex try to hide it from Gina.
6	6	"Joey and the Nemesis"	Kevin S. Bright	Sherry Bilsing-Graham & Ellen Plummer	October 14, 2004	2T5452	13.37
An actor named Brian Michael David Scott repeatedly tricks Joey into missing auditions. When Michael gets sick, Gina moves into Joey's place to take care of him, and Joey moves to Gina's place to get away from them. However, when staying at Gina's, her secret boyfriend mistakes Joey for her and snuggles up to him.
7	7	"Joey and the Husband"	Gail Mancuso	Brian Kelley	October 21, 2004	2T5454	11.69
Alex tells Joey that her husband may be threatened by him. When Joey finally meets Alex's husband, Eric, he is stunned when Eric is not threatened by him. Joey decides to donate his savings to Gina so that she can open up her own salon, but she has second thoughts.
8	8	"Joey and the Dream Girl, Part 1"	Gary Halvorson	Brian Buckner	November 4, 2004	2T5457	12.56
Gina's high school friend Donna, whom Joey used to have a huge crush on, visits. Joey promises Gina he won't do anything with Donna, who is getting a divorce, but cannot resist. Michael learns he used to be a great baseball player when he was younger.
9	9	"Joey and the Dream Girl, Part 2"	Gary Halvorson	Robert Carlock	November 11, 2004	2T5458	11.69
Joey tries to plan the perfect week for Donna, so she will choose him over her husband, who is attempting to reconcile with her. Alex discovers that she can get free stuff because she is a "hot girl".
10	10	"Joey and the Big Audition"	Sheldon Epps	John Quaintance	November 18, 2004	2T5459	11.92
At Alex's Northwestern alumni party, Joey is mistaken for a fellow alumnus by a movie producer. This helps him get an audition for a new show called Deep Powder, described as "Baywatch on skis". However, Joey soon finds out that the audition is not for the lead character, but for the lead's father. Guest star: Danneel Harris
11	11	"Joey and the Road Trip"	Kevin S. Bright	Vanessa McCarthy	December 2, 2004	2T5460	11.44
Joey gets a job as a celebrity judge for the Miss Southwestern U.S.A. pageant in Las Vegas. There, he sleeps with a woman, not realizing she is a contestant, while Alex goes to a Celine Dion concert and Michael teaches Gina how to count cards. Guest stars: Steven Schirripa as the Pit Boss and Bob Saget as himself.
12	12	"Joey and the Plot Twist"	Kevin S. Bright	Story by : Jon Pollack; Teleplay by : Craig DeGregorio	December 9, 2004	2T5461	10.20
At a press conference for Deep Powder, Joey accidentally reveals a plot twist, leading him to believe his character will get killed off in the first episode. Meanwhile, when the California heat makes it hard for Joey to get in the holiday spirit, Gina, Michael, and Alex decorate Joey's apartment for Christmas. Guest stars: Lucy Liu as Lauren, Colby Donaldson as Gunnar, and Danneel Harris as Katie.
13	13	"Joey and the Taste Test"	David Schwimmer	Shana Goldberg-Meehan & Scott Silveri	January 6, 2005	2T5462	12.51
After Gina teaches Alex how to make lasagna, Joey and Michael are forced to partake in a taste test. Joey's relationship with his costar Katie gets him in trouble with the executive producer. Guest stars: Lucy Liu as Lauren and Danneel Harris as Katie.
14	14	"Joey and the Premiere"	Kevin S. Bright	Matt Hubbard	January 13, 2005	2T5463	12.26
Joey brings Gina, Michael, and Alex to the premiere of Deep Powder. Gina's date is Lauren's ex-boyfriend and Alex's is a lesbian. Michael must decide between a girl and a Star Trek actor, and Joey kisses Lauren. Guest stars: Lucy Liu as Lauren, Colby Donaldson as Gunnar, and Brent Spiner as himself.
15	15	"Joey and the Assistant"	Andrew D. Weyman	John Quintance & Brian Kelley	January 20, 2005	2T5464	12.55
Joey hires an assistant named Glenn, who turns out to be perfect. However, after he begins dating Gina, things start to go downhill. Meanwhile, Alex holds a mediation between Michael and his friend Seth over a patent dispute.
16	16	"Joey and The Tonight Show"	Andrew D. Weyman	Doty Abrams	February 3, 2005	2T5465	9.96
Joey is supposed to appear on The Tonight Show with Jay Leno but gets stuck in heavy traffic. In traffic, Michael ends up stuck next to a guy he gave the finger to, and Gina meets two guys. Guest stars: Jay Leno as himself and Antonio Sabato Jr. as Kyle.
17	17	"Joey and the Valentine's Date"	Andrew D. Weyman	Story by : Brian Kelley; Teleplay by : Robert Carlock	February 10, 2005	2T5466	11.40
Joey unintentionally makes a date with a People magazine reporter on Valentine's Day, which causes her to believe Joey is looking for a serious relationship. A drunken Alex reveals sexual secrets to Gina, and Michael becomes 'one of the girls' after an attempt to hit on a group of girls.
18	18	"Joey and the Wrong Name"	Kevin S. Bright	Story by : Sherry Bilsing-Graham & Ellen Plummer; Teleplay by : Matt Hubbard	February 17, 2005	2T5467	9.84
Joey is nominated for a Daytime Soap Award, and he is also presenting an award but ends up announcing the wrong name. He brings Gina, who is uncomfortable because she is forced by Joey to dress unlike herself. Guest stars: Julia Duffy as Kimberly.
19	19	"Joey and the Fancy Sister"	Gary Halvorson	Robert Carlock & Brian Buckner	February 24, 2005	2T5468	9.96
Joey's sister Mary Theresa, whom Gina dislikes, comes to visit. When Mary Theresa discovers her engagement ring is fake, she decides to call off her wedding and stay in LA, causing Joey and Gina to try to find a way to get her to move back to New York State. Meanwhile, Michael is oblivious that a girl likes him.
20	20	"Joey and the Neighbor"	Gary Halvorson	Story by : Nicholas Darrow; Teleplay by : Vanessa McCarthy	March 24, 2005	2T5469	8.76
Joey starts to date his new, hot next-door neighbor Sara, but he forgets to cancel his backup date on the same day. Eric is back for the first time in two months, but Alex and he have problems after being apart for so long.
21	21	"Joey and the Spying"	Kevin S. Bright	Story by : Tracy Reilly; Teleplay by : Brian Buckner	April 21, 2005	2T5470	7.51
Even though Joey and Sara agreed to see other people, Joey realizes he cares too much about her. Alex and Eric separate, leading Eric to move into the apartment next door. Alex sees Eric with another woman and spies on him. Gina wants to break up with Glenn and tells him the reason is because Michael doesn't like him, causing Glenn to try to become closer with Michael.
22	22	"Joey and the Temptation"	Sheldon Epps	Story by : Craig DeGregorio; Teleplay by : Sherry Bilsing-Graham & Ellen Plummer	May 5, 2005	2T5471	7.46
Joey and Sara become exclusive, but Joey has a love scene with Carmen Electra for Deep Powder. Joey brings Michael along to help him resist her. Alex finds out Eric kissed another woman.
23	23	"Joey and the Breakup"	Andrew D. Weyman	Story by : John Quintance; Teleplay by : Nicholas Darrow	May 12, 2005	2T5472	8.56
Joey helps Sara get an interview with Newsweek, but she gets offered a job in Washington, D.C. Gina meets Michael's new girlfriend, who turns out to be a much older woman. Meanwhile, Alex struggles with her divorce, and Gina tries to cheer her up.
24	24	"Joey and the Moving In"	Kevin S. Bright	Scott Silveri & Shana Goldberg-Meehan	May 12, 2005	2T5473	8.56
Joey freaks out after asking Sara to move in with him. Alex doesn't know how to act on her first date after her divorce. Bobbie gives Michael tickets to a Star Wars preview but shows up as well, which leads Gina to confront Bobbie about her behavior around Michael.

=== Season 2 (2005–06) ===
No. overall	No. in season	Title	Directed by	Written by	Original release date	Prod. code	U.S. viewers (millions)
25	1	"Joey and the Big Break"	Kevin S. Bright	Scott Silveri & Robert Carlock	September 22, 2005	2T6451	7.80
26	2	"Joey and the Big Break"	Kevin S. Bright	Scott Silveri & Robert Carlock	September 22, 2005	2T6452	7.80
Things become awkward between Joey and Alex after having sex. Due to Joey's popularity on Deep Powder, Bobbie makes some outrageous demands, leading to him being fired. Gina starts working for Bobbie. A young aspiring actress moves in the complex and thinks Michael is Joey. Hearing voices in his head causes Joey to blow a couple of auditions. Gina gets to tell everyone bad news for Bobbie, Michael wants Joey to go on a double date with him, and Alex wants Joey to take her on a romantic date so she feels better about sleeping with him.
27	3	"Joey and the Spanking"	Kevin S. Bright	Michael Borkow	September 29, 2005	2T6454	7.45
Joey must deal with an unruly child actor on the set of his new movie. In order to discipline him, Joey spanks him. Gina helps Alex meet a guy so she can get over Joey. Guest stars: John Larroquette as Benjamin Lockwood.
28	4	"Joey and the Stuntman"	Kevin S. Bright	John Quaintance	October 6, 2005	2T6453	7.18
Joey's stuntman shadows him to learn his mannerisms. Abby, the script supervisor at the movie set, who nags Joey to memorize his lines, dates Michael, which annoys Joey. A photo of Joey and Alex appears in US Magazine, and Alex freaks out after Joey lets her tell the magazine what their relationship status is. Guest stars: Dan Cortese as Chuck.
29	5	"Joey and the House"	Ben Weiss	Brett Baer & Dave Finkel	October 13, 2005	2T6455	7.35
Joey thinks about buying a new house because of the amount of money he is making from his new movie. After helping Bobbie with anger management, Alex learns that she too has anger because of her relationship with Joey.
30	6	"Joey and the ESL"	Peter Bonerz	Vanessa McCarthy	October 20, 2005	2T6456	7.60
Joey follows a girl into an English-as-a-second-language class. After losing a client for Bobbie, Gina tries to sign Joey's costar Benjamin Lockwood, which irritates Joey.
31	7	"Joey and the Poker"	Kevin S. Bright	Matt Hubbard	November 3, 2005	2T6457	7.70
Joey and Alex play poker, but Alex lets Joey win so he'll continue to play with her. Because of this, he decides to play in Celebrity Poker Showdown. Zach tries to get Joey to donate to a children's recreation center.
32	8	"Joey and the Sex Tape"	Kevin S. Bright	Linda Videtti Figueiredo	November 10, 2005	2T6458	8.08
Joey tries to prevent a woman from releasing a sex tape of him. Gina discovers Bobbie has no plans for her fortieth birthday.
33	9	"Joey and the Musical"	Gary Halvorson	Vanessa McCarthy	November 17, 2005	2T6460	8.02
Joey and Zach direct a musical starring Gloria, Joey's girlfriend's grandmother. Alex writes a letter to Joey as a way to vent her anger, but Joey reads it and thinks it's about Eric. Bobbie's mother wants a part in the musical.
34	10	"Joey and the Bachelor Thanksgiving"	Kevin S. Bright	John Quaintance	November 24, 2005	2T6459	5.46
Despite Gina spending a lot of time planning Thanksgiving dinner, Joey decides to go to his bachelor neighbor Dean's party instead. Joey finds ancient Native American artifacts in his backyard and accidentally gives them away.
35	11	"Joey and the High School Friend"	Sheldon Epps	Michael Borkow	December 8, 2005	2T6461	7.77
Joey's best friend from high school, Jimmy, visits. It turns out their friendship abruptly ended because Gina was secretly sleeping with him. The crew from Joey's movie use chocolate milk as code for marijuana, but Joey thinks they are actually talking about chocolate milk. Joey thinks Jimmy is Michael's father.
36	12	"Joey and the Tijuana Trip"	Gary Halvorson	Robert Carlock	December 15, 2005	2T6462	7.99
Joey and the guys go to Tijuana after Michael breaks up with Abby. After Dean criticizes Alex's lifestyle, she and Gina go to a party to have fun.
37	13	"Joey and the Christmas Party"	Gary Halvorson	Matt Hubbard & Linda Videtti Figueiredo	December 15, 2005	2T6463	7.99
Joey finds out Alex is in love with him. He throws a Christmas party.
38	14	"Joey and the Snowball Fight"	Gary Halvorson	Tracy Reilly & Matt Hubbard	March 7, 2006	2T6464	4.09
Joey wants to be with Alex, but she is dating Dean. The action figure of Joey's character has problems. Gina thinks she is pregnant, and Jimmy must deal with the prospects of being a father.
39	15	"Joey and the Dad"	Kevin S. Bright	Robert Carlock & John Quaintance	April 18, 2006^{[A]}	2T6465	N/A
Joey flies his dad in for his movie premiere, but his dad disapproves of Joey's career; Joey is oblivious to this until Alex tells him. Joey's billboard is right next to Carmen Electra's, which is getting a lot more attention than his.
40	16	"Joey and the Party for Alex"	Gil Cates Jr.	Vanessa McCarthy	May 9, 2006^{[B]}	2T6466	N/A
Joey's feelings for Alex grow stronger. Dean throws a party for Alex's thirtieth birthday and plans to propose. Meanwhile, Gina and Jimmy decide to get tattoos together.
41	17	"Joey and the Big Move"	Gary Halvorson	Jean Yu	May 16, 2006^{[C]}	2T6467	N/A
Joey finally moves into his house, but a fire destroys it. Jimmy learns that he is Michael's father, and he and Joey try to get Michael's DNA without him knowing, so they can conduct a paternity test. Meanwhile, Michael gets new roommates.
42	18	"Joey and the Beard"	Peter Bonerz	Dan Holden & Linda Videtti Figueiredo	May 23, 2006^{[C]}	2T6468	N/A
Joey dates a famous actress, Edie, but doesn't know she only needs him as a beard. Jimmy moves in with Gina.
43	19	"Joey and the Critic"	Ben Weiss	Michael Borkow	May 30, 2006^{[A]}	2T6469	N/A
Joey's movie is getting great reviews, except one critic gives it a 0%. The critic turns out to be an eleven-year-old girl. Joey starts his own production company and hires Jimmy, but things do not go well. Alex breaks up with Dean but needs Joey to be her friend.
44	20	"Joey and the Actor's Studio"	Kevin S. Bright	John Quaintance	June 6, 2006^{[A]}	2T6470	N/A
Joey appears on Inside the Actors Studio. There, Alex learns how badly Joey has treated some women in the past and is unsure if she wants to go out with him. Joey and Jimmy sign up for a clinical trial for testing new medicine so Jimmy can afford a ring to propose to Gina.
45	21	"Joey and the Holding Hands"	Peter Bonerz	Vanessa McCarthy & Robert Carlock	June 28, 2006^{[C]}	2T6471	N/A
Joey's sexual relationship with Alex is great, but he wants a deeper connection. Michael meets a woman online named sexysteve87. After Gina accepts Jimmy's proposal, she learns he is already married.
46	22	"Joey and the Wedding"	Kevin S. Bright	Alison Flierl & John Quaintance	August 23, 2006^{[C]}	2T6472	N/A
After Alex gets really excited about planning the wedding, Joey thinks she wants to get married. However, it turns out she doesn't ever want to get married. Michael thinks he's the best man, even though Jimmy asked Joey. Jimmy and Gina both get cold feet right before the wedding.

^{A} First broadcast in Ireland on RTÉ Two
^{B} First broadcast in Latin America on WBTV and Norway on TV 2
^{C} First broadcast in Latin America on WBTV

== International airings ==
In Brazil, the show premiered on November 2, 2004, and it was first aired on Warner Channel. The entire series was broadcast. Two years later, it also premiered on terrestrial television channel SBT, under the name Vida de Artista ("Artist's Life"). The show was also screened in New Zealand on TV2 and in Australia on the Nine Network. In the United Kingdom, it aired on Channel 5 from February 13, 2005.

== Reception and cancellation ==
Joey premiered on NBC on September 9, 2004, as part of the network's Thursday-night comedy lineup. Although the series was not well received by critics, the pilot episode attracted 18.6 million viewers. As the first season progressed, ratings fell but remained average (10.1 million viewers). NBC renewed the series for a second season and moved it to Tuesday nights, opposite Fox's highly rated American Idol.

Ratings for the second season fell to an all-time low (4.1 million viewers), and NBC put the show on hiatus in March 2006. The network officially canceled the show in May 2006, citing low ratings.

=== Nielsen ratings ===
Average Nielsen ratings for Joey
Season	Timeslot (ET)	Season premiere	Season finale	TV season	Rank	Viewers (in millions)	18-49 rating/share (rank)	Season high (in millions)	Season low (in millions)
1	Thursday 8:00 P.M. (September 9, 2004 – May 12, 2005)	September 9, 2004	May 12, 2005	2004–2005	#45	10.7	4.2/12 (#32)	18.6	7.5
2	Thursday 8:00 P.M. (September 22, 2005 – December 15, 2005); Tuesday 8:30 P.M. (March 7, 2006)	September 22, 2005	August 23, 2006	2005–2006	#85	7.0	2.8/8 (#74)	8.4	4.1

== Awards and nominations ==
Joey won the People's Choice Award for Favorite New Television Comedy, and Matt LeBlanc won Favorite Male Television Star. LeBlanc was also nominated for the Golden Globe Award for Best Actor – Television Series Musical or Comedy.

== Home media and streaming ==
The first season of Joey was released on DVD on May 30, 2006. The second season was issued in Canada in 2008 but did not receive a release in the United States.

On March 12, 2025, the show began streaming on the official Friends YouTube channel. Two episodes were posted weekly until May 27, when the last two episodes of the first season were uploaded. The second season was uploaded to YouTube from September to November 2025.
