= Zach Anner =

American comedian, actor and writer

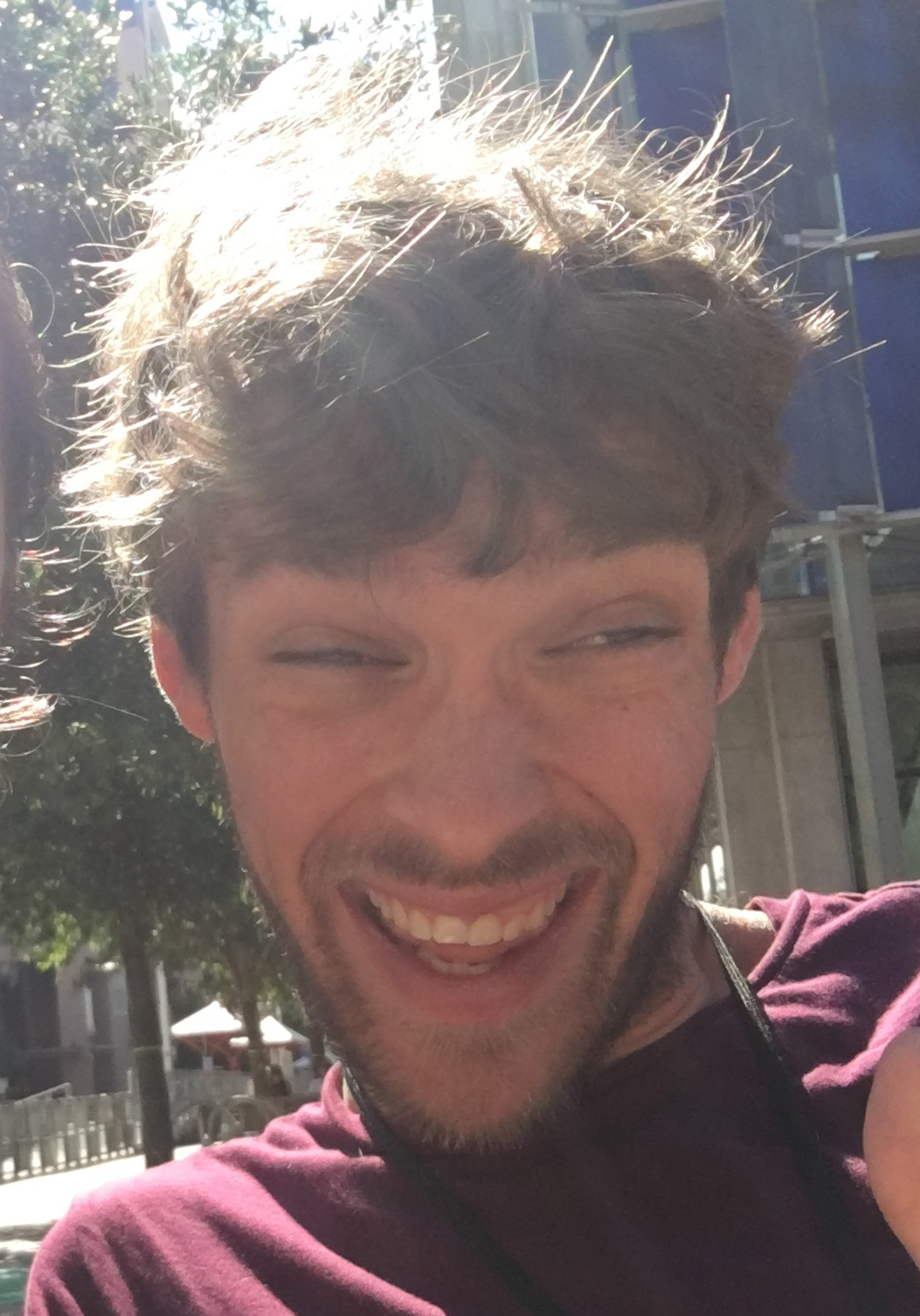
- Anner at RTX 2016
- Born: November 17, 1984 (age 42); Buffalo, New York, United States
- Education: Kenmore West Senior High School
- Years active: 2010–present
- Website: www.zachanner.com

Zach Anner (born November 17, 1984) is an American comedian, actor, and writer with cerebral palsy who gained worldwide attention with the submission of a video to Oprah Winfrey's "Search for the Next TV Star" competition. He won his own TV show on OWN through Oprah's Your OWN Show: Oprah's Search for the Next TV Star. His wheelchair travel show, Rollin' With Zach, premiered December 12, 2011. He wrote for and guest-starred on the 2016–2019 ABC-TV sitcom Speechless, which is centered on a teenager with cerebral palsy.

== Early life and education ==
Zach Anner is originally from Kenmore, New York. He was born with cerebral palsy. Anner graduated from Kenmore West Senior High School.

After a stint working for Disney World as a park security specialist at Epcot, he started college at the University of Texas, Austin, in 2005. While attending school, he obtained celebrity interviews through That's Awesome, a sketch comedy program on Texas Student TV K29HW-D, the university's local public-access television cable TV channel. That's Awesome was created by independent filmmaker Mark Dennis, a friend Zach credits as the one who encouraged him to be in front of the camera. Also at UT-Austin, Anner was a member of comedy troupe Lark the Beard, with whom he wrote and appeared in the mockumentary web-series The Wingmen

== Oprah contest and Rollin' With Zach ==
On June 2, 2010, Anner uploaded a video submission to a contest sponsored by Oprah Winfrey and Harpo Productions. Oprah's "Search for the Next TV Star" contest is a chance for one "top five" finalist to compete on a reality show located in Los Angeles, California. The winner of the reality program would receive a show on OWN: Oprah Winfrey Network. The "top five" online finalists were to be determined by the number of votes their video received. On the morning of Friday, June 11, 2010, Anner had just over 3,000 votes for his video submission, while the leader of the competition possessed more votes.

By the night of Saturday, June 12, celebrity endorsements and support began to appear for Anner. John Mayer, an early supporter of Anner's, posted words of encouragement on his blog. According to The Daily Texan, Anner, who had taken a weekend trip to Dallas, was unaware of the overnight success of his video submission. Anner's friends filmed his reaction to the then over 2,000,000 votes, as well as the blog and "To Zach Anner" video by John Mayer. Anner exclaimed, "How.... what the... what the balls is this?" at the sight of his new popularity. As a response, Anner posted the subsequent "Thank You, Internet" and "I want to come and see you!" videos.

On February 25, it was announced that Zach Anner had won the competition, winning his own television show, $100,000, and a Chevrolet Equinox. The show, titled Rollin' With Zach, premiered December 12, 2011, but was cancelled after six episodes.

=== Celebrity and media support ===
As of June 15, 2010, Anner had received support from Perez Hilton, John Mayer, Harry Knowles, David Hasselhoff, Daniel Tosh, and others on the Internet. He had also received coverage in New York Magazine, Time, Entertainment Weekly, ABC News, Fox News (Red Eye), Tubefilter.tv, and G4TV.

=== Alleged rigging ===
According to internet speculation, the contest was rigged against Anner, as a contestant named Dr. Phyllis received over 300,000 votes in 20 minutes and surpassed Anner. Many voters noticed that after they placed a vote for Anner, the total number of his votes would actually decrease, further adding to the belief that the system was rigged. Anner expressed skepticism about the alleged rigging, stating, "I sincerely doubt that Oprah would do anything like that. She’s probably too busy building schools and helping children to even notice someone like me."

== YouTube ==
Anner has a YouTube channel where he posts videos on a weekly basis. The channel has over 350,000 subscribers and over 15 million total views. He has multiple series that he includes on the channel, including project "Riding Shotgun", which premiered on October 23, 2012, and "Workout Wednesday", which premiered on August 21, 2013. The latter featured a video that was auto-tuned by The Gregory Brothers. In 2013, Zach started doing a show with SoulPancake titled "Have a little faith", in which he explores, in his comedic way, the basic rules of several religions that have a foothold in the United States. Among other religions, Zach has explored Judaism, Islam, the Bahá'í faith, Mormonism, Quakerism, Baptism, and Catholicism.

Zach has also been featured on the Rooster Teeth shows The Eleven Little Roosters, Million Dollars But..., and its game show, On The Spot, as a contestant.

Since April 2025, Anner has been a part of "Answer for It" alongside James and Elyse Willems, and A.J. LoCascio.

== Television ==
Anner wrote for the 2016–2019 ABC television series Speechless. He also guest starred on three episodes of the show as Lee.

== Personal life ==
Anner is engaged to his girlfriend Karlee Currin, as of December 2024. They were married in June, 2026.
