= Scott Silveri =

American television producer and writer

- Born: United States
- Occupation(s): Writer, television producer
- Spouse: Shana Goldberg-Meehan (m. 2006)

Scott Silveri is an American television producer and writer.

He is the creator of Go On and Speechless and the co-creator of Perfect Couples (with Jon Pollack) and Joey (with Shana Goldberg-Meehan, whom he met while working on the Harvard Lampoon and married in 2006). He was also a writer and executive producer on Friends.

== Filmography ==
Film/TV Series
Year	Title	Role	Additional Notes
1992	Mad About You		
1996–2004	Friends	Producer, writer, editor	1996–1997: story editor, 1997–2000: Executive Story Editor, 1998: Co-Producer, 1999: Supervising Producer, 1998–1999: Producer, 1999–2001: Co-Executive Producer, 2001–2004: Executive Producer
2004–06	Joey	Co-Creator, writer, Executive Producer	2004–06: Writer, Executive Producer
2007	Up All Night (TV Movie)	Writer	
2010–11	Perfect Couples	Co-Creator, writer	
2012–13	Go On	Creator, executive producer, executive producer	
2013	Three Mississippi	Writer	
2016–2019	Speechless	Creator, executive producer, writer	
