= Speechless (TV series) =

American comedy television series

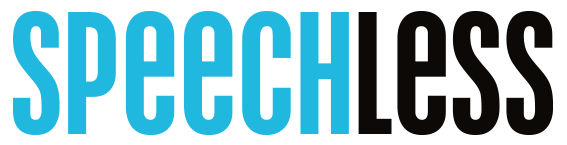
- Genre: Sitcom
- Created by: Scott Silveri
- Starring: Minnie Driver; John Ross Bowie; Cedric Yarbrough; Mason Cook; Micah Fowler; Kyla Kenedy
- Composer: Jeff Cardoni
- Country of origin: United States
- Original language: English
- No. of seasons: 3
- No. of episodes: 63 (list of episodes)

Production
- Executive producers: Christine Gernon; Jake Kasdan; Melvin Mar; Scott Silveri
- Camera setup: Single-camera
- Running time: 21 minutes
- Production companies: Silver and Gold Productions; The Detective Agency; ABC Studios; 20th Century Fox Television

Original release
- Network: ABC
- Release: September 21, 2016 – April 12, 2019

Speechless is an American television sitcom that aired on ABC from September 21, 2016, to April 12, 2019. Created by Scott Silveri and co-executive produced with Christine Gernon, Jake Kasdan, and Melvin Mar, the 20th Century Fox Television/ABC Studios co-production was greenlighted to series order on May 13, 2016. A first-look trailer was released on the same day. Starring Minnie Driver, John Ross Bowie and Micah Fowler, the sitcom explores the serious and humorous challenges a family faces with a teenager with a disability. On September 29, 2016, the series was picked up for a full 22-episode season. An additional episode was ordered on December 13, 2016, for a 23-episode season. On May 10, 2019, ABC cancelled the series after three seasons.

== Premise ==
Artwork used for season 1 parodying The Beatles' Abbey Road

The series follows the DiMeo family, each with a unique personality: Maya, a take-charge British mother with a no-holds-barred attitude; her husband Jimmy, who does not seem to care what others think; Dylan, their no-nonsense athletic daughter; Ray, their scholarly middle child who acts as the "voice of reason" in the family; and their oldest son, JJ — a high schooler who has a biting wit and sense of humor, and is diagnosed with cerebral palsy. JJ communicates by using headgear with a laser pointer to indicate various words, letters, and numbers on a board attached to his wheelchair. One of the reasons the DiMeos move frequently, is due to an attempt to find a good educational environment for JJ. They believe they have found an optimal choice when they discover a school that prides itself on being accessible to those with disabilities and where JJ will have an aide support him throughout the school day. Because the school is in an upscale part of town, Jimmy and Maya move the family into the cheapest, most rundown house in an otherwise nice neighborhood. Though they quickly find that not everything is as good as it could be, JJ enjoys having Kenneth, a gentle, well-meaning school groundskeeper with a deep and resonant speaking voice, work as his aide.

== Cast and characters ==
=== Main ===
- Minnie Driver as Maya DiMeo, the fierce and determined mother of the family
- John Ross Bowie as Jimmy DiMeo, the fun-loving, easily persuadable father of the family who is a supervisor of baggage handlers at the airport
- Mason Cook as Raymond "Ray" DiMeo, the middle child. Slender and nerdy, he faces constant harassment, mostly from Dylan.
- Micah Fowler as Jimmy "JJ" DiMeo Jr., The eldest child, with cerebral palsy. He is non-speaking (thus the show's title) and uses a wheelchair. He has a crush on Emma Watson, which serves as a running gag on the show.
- Kyla Kenedy as Dylan DiMeo, the athletic youngest child, and only daughter. She enjoys pulling pranks and harassing others, especially Ray.
- Cedric Yarbrough as Kenneth Clements, the good-natured aide to JJ who serves as his voice. Although he and Maya tend to butt heads, she is appreciative of his work.

=== Recurring ===
- Marin Hinkle as Dr. Ava Miller, the principal of the kids' school who is easily influenced by Maya
- Jonathan Slavin as Mr. Powers, one of JJ's teachers
- Pepper, the happy Golden Retriever who's supposed to be Dylan's pet, but acts like he's more fond of the others
- Liz Cackowski as Joyce, JJ's physiotherapist
- Sarah Chalke as Melanie Hertzal, Taylor's mother
- Kayla Maisonet as Izzy, JJ's girlfriend
- Jack Dylan Grazer as Rev
- David Lengel as Tad
- Sedona Cohen as Taylor, Ray's ex-girlfriend
- Cole Massie as Logan, Melanie's son, Taylor's brother, and JJ's nemesis
- Karly Rothenberg as Crossing Guard

=== Special guests ===
- Rob Corddry as Billy, Jimmy's brother
- Andrea Anders as Audrey, Billy's wife
- Julianne Hough as Miss Bloom, the new choir teacher at the kids' school
- Jamie Denbo as Janet, the DiMeos' insurance agent
- Jim O'Heir as Stu, the DiMeos' former insurance agent
- Ken Marino as Ethan, Maya's ex-boyfriend
- Michaela Watkins as Becca, a new mom at the group of families with disabled kids
- Zach Anner as Lee, a wheelchair-using young man who Maya asks to speak with JJ about living on his own
- Holland Taylor as Andrea, Maya's pretentious mother
- Keith David as Colonel Clements, Kenneth's father
- John Cleese as Martin, Maya's father who lives in London
- Julie White as Helen, Lee's over protective mother
- Niecy Nash as Kiki, Kenneth's sister
- Lisa Leslie as Kendall, Kenneth's sister
- Tricia O'Kelley as Candy Kensington
- Nikki Rodriguez as Madison
- Rondi Reed as Nina
- Christopher Thornton as Chris
- Bella Thorne as Cassidy
- Jay Chandrasekhar as Coach

== Episodes ==
Season	Episodes	Originally released	
Season	Episodes	First released	Last released
1	23	September 21, 2016	May 17, 2017
2	18	September 27, 2017	March 21, 2018
3	22	October 5, 2018	April 12, 2019

== Production ==
=== Development ===
On January 11, 2016, it was announced that ABC had given the production a pilot order as Speechless. The episode was written by Scott Silveri who was expected to executive produce alongside Christine Gernon, Jake Kasdan and Melvin Mar. Production companies involved with the pilot include Silver and Gold Productions, The Detective Agency, ABC Studios and 20th Century Fox Television. On May 13, 2016, ABC officially ordered the pilot to series. A few days later, it was announced that the series would premiere in the fall of 2016 and air on Tuesdays at 9:30 P.M. EST. On September 23, 2016, ABC picked up the series for a full season of 22 episodes and on December 13, they get only one episode. On May 12, 2017, ABC renewed the series for a second season which premiered on September 27, 2017. On May 11, 2018, ABC renewed the series for a third season and announced it would air on Fridays at 8:30 P.M. EST and premiered on October 5, 2018.

=== Casting ===
On February 24, 2016, it was announced that Cedric Yarbrough had been cast in the pilot. In March 2016, it was reported that Minnie Driver and John Ross Bowie had also joined the pilot's main cast.

=== Cancellation ===
Speechless aired on the network ABC for about three years before the ultimate decision to cancel it. The final decision to cancel the show was made due to the fact that it was the lowest-rated series on the network. Variety explains that the last, and concluding season, ranked the lowest within the network with only around 2.3 million live viewers. Deadline notes that former ABC president, Karey Burke explained that the cancellation of the show Speechless was a "gut wrenching" decision.

One of the main actors, Minnie Driver, notes that while it is saddening that the show has been canceled, the main hope is that the show left a lasting impact on its audience. Minnie Driver, who plays JJ's mom, continued to explain she believes that conversations regarding disability, love, as well as family have been left in better terms than they were found. Another main actor, Micah Fowler, who portrays JJ on the show, took to Twitter to express his gratitude towards the fans, and staff, for the amazing life-changing opportunity.

== Reception ==
=== Critical response ===
Speechless received largely positive reviews from critics. On Rotten Tomatoes, the series has a rating of 98%, based on 41 reviews, with an average rating of 8.2/10. The site's critical consensus reads, "Speechless speaks to a sensitive topic with a heartfelt lead performance and a fine balance of sensitivity and irreverence." On Metacritic, the series has a score of 79 out of 100, based on 29 critics, indicating "generally favorable reviews".

The editors of TV Guide placed Speechless seventh among the top ten picks for the most anticipated new shows of the 2016–17 season. In its review from writer Liam Matthews, "ABC has another worthwhile addition to its strong lineup of modern families with Speechless," adding "It's a clear-eyed and empathetic exploration of life in a special-needs family that makes plenty of room for hilarity."

=== Portrayal of disabilities ===
Speechless is one of the few shows that portrays the life of a teenager with a disability. It is also one of the few shows that has a disabled actor play the character. According to Bond, there are approximately 21 million children, between the ages of 5 and 15, who have a disability. If television, and the media, were able to mirror the demographics of the U.S. then about 14% of characters would be disabled. Speechless was just one example, however it was cancelled after a couple of seasons due to 'low ratings' despite a good audience reception. Bond notes that media representation of disability, both mental and physical, may impact audiences in a more profound manner than telling them what disability is like. Through the introduction of physical disabilities, there is hope to integrate individuals into society, without prejudice and biases. Bond continues to explain that children begin to distinguish and detect differences as young as 4 years of age. Marquis notes that representations in movies like Still Alice and The Theory of Everything are two popular examples that perpetuate inconsistencies about the disabled body. These authors explain that there is disability representation in the media, however it is lacking authenticity and adequate portrayal. Shows like Speechless should be given a platform, for the actors and production team, to speak on the issues surrounding representation.

=== Ratings ===
Viewership and ratings per season of Speechless
Season	Timeslot (ET)	Episodes	First aired		Last aired		TV season	Viewership rank	Avg. viewers (millions)	18–49 rank	Avg. 18–49 rating
Season	Timeslot (ET)	Episodes	Date	Viewers (millions)	Date	Viewers (millions)	TV season	Viewership rank	Avg. viewers (millions)	18–49 rank	Avg. 18–49 rating
1	Wednesday 8:30 pm	23	September 21, 2016	7.38	May 17, 2017	4.52	2016–17	63	6.23	TBD	1.9
2	Wednesday 8:30 pm	18	September 27, 2017	5.03	March 21, 2018	4.60	2017–18	101	4.88	TBD	1.4
3	Friday 8:30 pm	22	October 5, 2018	2.43	April 12, 2019	2.31	2018–19	137	3.11	TBD	0.8

=== Accolades ===
Year	Award	Category	Recipient(s)	Result	Ref.
2017	People's Choice Awards	Favorite Actress In A New TV Series	Minnie Driver	Nominated	
2017	People's Choice Awards	Favorite New TV Comedy	Speechless	Nominated	
2017	Writers Guild of America Awards	Episodic Comedy	Carrie Rosen & Seth Kurland for "R-A-Y-C-Ray-Cation"	Nominated	
2017	ICG Publicists Awards	Maxwell Weinberg Award – Television	Speechless	Nominated	
2017	Golden Trailer Awards	Best Trailerbyte for a TV Series/Streaming Series	Speechless	Nominated	
2017	Television Critics Association Awards	Outstanding Achievement in Youth Programming	Speechless	Won	

== Home media ==
DVD name	Ep #	Release date
Speechless: The Complete First Season	23	June 12, 2018
Speechless: The Complete Second Season	18	June 12, 2018
Speechless: The Complete Third Season	22	July 9, 2019

iTunes Name	Ep #	Release date
Speechless, Season 1-3	63	April 13, 2019
