= 2011–12 United States network television schedule =

Television schedule for the fall of 2011

The 2011–12 network television schedule for the five major English-language commercial broadcast networks in the United States covers prime time hours from September 2011 through August 2012. The schedule is followed by a list per network of returning series, new series, and series canceled after the 2010–11 season.

NBC was the first to announce its fall schedule on May 15, 2011, followed by Fox on May 16, ABC on May 17, CBS on May 18 and The CW on May 19, 2011.

The CW was the first to announce their midseason schedule on November 2, 2011, followed by CBS and NBC on November 14, 2011, ABC on November 18, 2011, and Fox on December 1, 2011.

PBS is not included; member stations have local flexibility over most of their schedules and broadcast times for network shows may vary. MyNetworkTV is also not included since its programming comprises syndicated reruns, with limited original programming. The CW is not included on weekends, when it does not offer network programming. Ion Television primarily airs syndicated reruns, along with new episodes of Flashpoint.

New series are highlighted in bold.

All times are U.S. Eastern Time and Pacific Time (except for some live sports or events). Subtract one hour for Central and Mountain times.

From July 27 to August 12, 2012, all of NBC's primetime programming was preempted in favor of coverage of the 2012 Summer Olympics in London.

Each of the 30 highest-rated shows is listed with its rank and rating as determined by Nielsen Media Research.

== Legend ==
- Light blue indicates local programming.
- Gray indicates encore programming.
- Blue-gray indicates news programming.
- Light green indicates sporting events.
- Light purple indicates movies.
- Red indicates series being burned off and other regularly scheduled programs and including specials.
- Yellow indicates the top-10 most watched programs of the season.
- Cyan indicates the top-20 most watched programs of the season.
- Magenta indicates the top-30 most watched programs of the season.

== Sunday ==
Network		7:00 p.m.	7:30 p.m.	8:00 p.m.	8:30 p.m.	9:00 p.m.	9:30 p.m.	10:00 p.m.	10:30 p.m.
ABC	Fall	America's Funniest Home Videos		**Once Upon a Time** (28/7.0) (Tied with 2 Broke Girls and Desperate Housewives)		Desperate Housewives (28/7.0) (Tied with 2 Broke Girls and Once Upon a Time)		**Pan Am**	
ABC	Winter	America's Funniest Home Videos		**Once Upon a Time** (28/7.0) (Tied with 2 Broke Girls and Desperate Housewives)		Desperate Housewives (28/7.0) (Tied with 2 Broke Girls and Once Upon a Time)		**Pan Am**	
ABC	Spring	America's Funniest Home Videos		**Once Upon a Time** (28/7.0) (Tied with 2 Broke Girls and Desperate Housewives)		Desperate Housewives (28/7.0) (Tied with 2 Broke Girls and Once Upon a Time)		**GCB**	
ABC	Summer	America's Funniest Home Videos		Secret Millionaire		Extreme Makeover: Weight Loss Edition			
CBS	Fall	60 Minutes (14/8.3)		The Amazing Race		The Good Wife (19/7.8) (Tied with Blue Bloods)		CSI: Miami (27/7.1)	
CBS	Winter	60 Minutes (14/8.3)		Undercover Boss		The Good Wife (19/7.8) (Tied with Blue Bloods)		CSI: Miami (27/7.1)	
CBS	Late winter	60 Minutes (14/8.3)		The Amazing Race		The Good Wife (19/7.8) (Tied with Blue Bloods)		CSI: Miami (27/7.1)	
CBS	Spring	60 Minutes (14/8.3)		The Amazing Race		The Good Wife (19/7.8) (Tied with Blue Bloods)		**NYC 22**	
CBS	Summer	60 Minutes (14/8.3)		Big Brother		**3**		The Mentalist (R)	
CBS	Late summer	60 Minutes (14/8.3)		Big Brother		Various programming		The Mentalist (R)	
Fox	Fall	Fox NFL	The OT	The Simpsons	The Cleveland Show	Family Guy	American Dad!	Local programming	
Fox	Mid-fall	Fox NFL	The Cleveland Show	The Simpsons	**Allen Gregory**	Family Guy	American Dad!	Local programming	
Fox	Winter	Bob's Burgers (R)	The Cleveland Show	The Simpsons	**Napoleon Dynamite**	Family Guy	American Dad!	Local programming	
Fox	Spring	The Simpsons (R)	The Cleveland Show	The Simpsons	Bob's Burgers	Family Guy	American Dad!	Local programming	
Fox	Summer	American Dad! (R)	The Cleveland Show	The Simpsons	Bob's Burgers	Family Guy	American Dad!	Local programming	
Fox	Mid-summer	American Dad! (R)	The Cleveland Show	The Simpsons	The Simpsons (R)	Family Guy	Family Guy (R)	Local programming	
NBC	Fall	Football Night in America		NBC Sunday Night Football (8:20 p.m.) (continued to game completion) (1/12.4)					
NBC	Winter	Dateline NBC				Various movies and specials			
NBC	Spring	Dateline NBC		Harry's Law		The Apprentice			
NBC	Summer	Various programing							

== Monday ==
Network		8:00 p.m.	8:30 p.m.	9:00 p.m.	9:30 p.m.	10:00 p.m.	10:30 p.m.
ABC	Fall	Dancing with the Stars (3/12.0)				Castle (16/8.0) (Tied with CSI: Crime Scene Investigation)	
ABC	Late fall	Holiday Specials		**You Deserve It**		Castle (16/8.0) (Tied with CSI: Crime Scene Investigation)	
ABC	Winter	The Bachelor				Castle (16/8.0) (Tied with CSI: Crime Scene Investigation)	
ABC	Spring	Dancing with the Stars (3/12.0)				Castle (16/8.0) (Tied with CSI: Crime Scene Investigation)	
ABC	Summer	The Bachelorette				**The Glass House**	
ABC	Mid-summer	Bachelor Pad				**The Glass House**	
CBS		How I Met Your Mother	**2 Broke Girls** (28/7.0) (Tied with Desperate Housewives and Once Upon a Time)	Two and a Half Men (11/9.1)	Mike & Molly (25/7.2) (Tied with Rob)	Hawaii Five-0 (21/7.6) (Tied with Grey's Anatomy)	
The CW	Fall	Gossip Girl		**Hart of Dixie**		Local programming	
The CW	Winter	Gossip Girl		**Hart of Dixie**		Local programming	
The CW	Spring	Gossip Girl		**Hart of Dixie**		Local programming	
The CW	Summer	**The Catalina**		Various programming		Local programming	
Fox	Fall	**Terra Nova**		House		Local programming	
Fox	Winter	House		**Alcatraz**		Local programming	
Fox	Spring	Bones		House		Local programming	
Fox	Summer	Hell's Kitchen		MasterChef		Local programming	
Fox	Late summer	**Hotel Hell**		Hell's Kitchen		Local programming	
NBC	Fall	The Sing-Off				**The Playboy Club**	
NBC	Mid-fall	The Sing-Off				**Rock Center with Brian Williams**	
NBC	Winter	**Who's Still Standing?**		Fear Factor		**Rock Center with Brian Williams**	
NBC	Mid-winter	The Voice (10/9.2)				**Smash**	
NBC	Spring	The Voice (10/9.2)				**Smash**	
NBC	Summer	Various programming		American Ninja Warrior		**Grimm**	
NBC	Late summer	Various programming		**Stars Earn Stripes**		**Grimm**	

== Tuesday ==
Network		8:00 p.m.	8:30 p.m.	9:00 p.m.	9:30 p.m.	10:00 p.m.	10:30 p.m.
ABC	Fall	**Last Man Standing**	**Man Up!**	Dancing with the Stars (6/10.6)		Body of Proof	
ABC	Late fall	**Last Man Standing**	**Man Up!**	Encore programming		Body of Proof	
ABC	Winter	**Last Man Standing**	**Work It**	Wife Swap		Body of Proof	
ABC	Mid-winter	**Last Man Standing**	**Last Man Standing** (R)	Wife Swap		Body of Proof	
ABC	Late winter	**Last Man Standing**	Cougar Town	**The River**		Body of Proof	
ABC	Spring	**Last Man Standing**	Cougar Town	Dancing with the Stars (6/10.6)		Body of Proof	
ABC	Mid-spring	**Last Man Standing**	Cougar Town	Dancing with the Stars (6/10.6)		Private Practice	
ABC	Summer	Wipeout		**Trust Us with Your Life**		**NY Med**	
ABC	Mid-summer	Encore programming				**NY Med**	
CBS		NCIS (2/12.3)		NCIS: Los Angeles (7/10.2)		**Unforgettable** (18/7.9)	
The CW	Fall	90210		**Ringer**		Local programming	
The CW	Winter	90210		**Ringer**		Local programming	
The CW	Spring	90210		**The L.A. Complex**		Local programming	
The CW	Summer	Encore programming		**The L.A. Complex**		Local programming	
Fox	Fall	Glee		**New Girl**	Raising Hope	Local programming	
Fox	Winter	Glee		**New Girl**	Raising Hope	Local programming	
Fox	Late winter	Raising Hope	**I Hate My Teenage Daughter**	**New Girl**	Breaking In	Local programming	
Fox	Spring	Raising Hope	Raising Hope (R)	**New Girl**	Breaking In	Local programming	
Fox	Mid-spring	Glee		**New Girl**	Raising Hope	Local programming	
Fox	Late spring	Glee		**New Girl**	**New Girl** (R)	Local programming	
Fox	Summer	Hell's Kitchen		MasterChef		Local programming	
NBC	Fall	The Biggest Loser				Parenthood	
NBC	Winter	Special programming		The Biggest Loser			
NBC	Mid-winter	The Biggest Loser				Parenthood	
NBC	Spring	The Biggest Loser				**Fashion Star**	
NBC	Mid-spring	The Biggest Loser		The Voice		**Fashion Star**	
NBC	Summer	America's Got Talent				Love in the Wild	
NBC	Mid-summer	America's Got Talent				Encore programming	

== Wednesday ==
Network		8:00 p.m.	8:30 p.m.	9:00 p.m.	9:30 p.m.	10:00 p.m.	10:30 p.m.
ABC	Fall	The Middle	**Suburgatory**	Modern Family (15/8.1)	Happy Endings	**Revenge**	
ABC	Winter	The Middle	**Suburgatory**	Modern Family (15/8.1)	Happy Endings	**Revenge**	
ABC	Spring	The Middle	**Suburgatory**	Modern Family (15/8.1)	**Don't Trust the B— in Apartment 23**	**Revenge**	
ABC	Summer	The Middle	**Suburgatory**	Modern Family (15/8.1)	Happy Endings (R)	**Don't Trust the B— in Apartment 23** (R)	Modern Family (R)
ABC	Mid-summer	The Middle	**Suburgatory**	Modern Family (15/8.1)	Modern Family (R)	**Final Witness**	
ABC	Late summer	The Middle	**Suburgatory**	Modern Family (15/8.1)	**Suburgatory** (R)	Encore programming	
CBS	Fall	Survivor: South Pacific		Criminal Minds (13/8.6)		CSI: Crime Scene Investigation (16/8.0) (Tied with Castle)	
CBS	Winter	Various programming		Criminal Minds (13/8.6)		CSI: Crime Scene Investigation (16/8.0) (Tied with Castle)	
CBS	Late winter	Survivor: One World		Criminal Minds (13/8.6)		CSI: Crime Scene Investigation (16/8.0) (Tied with Castle)	
CBS	Spring	Survivor: One World		Criminal Minds (13/8.6)		CSI: Crime Scene Investigation (16/8.0) (Tied with Castle)	
CBS	Summer	**Dogs in the City**		Criminal Minds (13/8.6)		CSI: Crime Scene Investigation (16/8.0) (Tied with Castle)	
CBS	Mid-summer	Big Brother		Criminal Minds (13/8.6)		CSI: Crime Scene Investigation (16/8.0) (Tied with Castle)	
The CW	Fall	**H8R**		America's Next Top Model		Local programming	
The CW	Mid-fall	Encore programming		America's Next Top Model		Local programming	
The CW	Winter	One Tree Hill		**Remodeled**		Local programming	
The CW	Late winter	One Tree Hill		America's Next Top Model		Local programming	
The CW	Spring	Encore programming		America's Next Top Model		Local programming	
The CW	Summer	**Oh Sit!**		Supernatural (R)		Local programming	
Fox	Fall	**The X Factor** (23/7.4)				Local programming	
Fox	Late fall	**The X Factor** (23/7.4)			**I Hate My Teenage Daughter**	Local programming	
Fox	Winter	Encore programming		Mobbed		Local programming	
Fox	Mid-winter	American Idol (4/11.8)		Mobbed		Local programming	
Fox	Spring	American Idol (4/11.8)		Mobbed		Local programming	
Fox	Summer	So You Think You Can Dance				Local programming	
NBC	Fall	**Up All Night**	**Free Agents**	Harry's Law		Law & Order: Special Victims Unit	
NBC	Mid-fall	**Up All Night**	**Whitney** (R)	Harry's Law		Law & Order: Special Victims Unit	
NBC	Late fall	**Up All Night**	**Up All Night** (R)	Harry's Law		Law & Order: Special Victims Unit	
NBC	Winter	**Whitney**	**Are You There, Chelsea?**	Harry's Law		Law & Order: Special Victims Unit	
NBC	Late winter	**Whitney**	**Are You There, Chelsea?**	**Rock Center with Brian Williams**		Law & Order: Special Victims Unit	
NBC	Spring	**Whitney**	**Are You There, Chelsea?**	**Bent**		**Rock Center with Brian Williams**	
NBC	Mid-spring	**Betty White's Off Their Rockers**	**Best Friends Forever**	**Rock Center with Brian Williams**		Law & Order: Special Victims Unit	
NBC	Late spring	**Betty White's Off Their Rockers**		**Rock Center with Brian Williams**		Law & Order: Special Victims Unit	
NBC	Summer	Various programming		America's Got Talent		Law & Order: Special Victims Unit	

== Thursday ==
Network		8:00 p.m.	8:30 p.m.	9:00 p.m.	9:30 p.m.	10:00 p.m.	10:30 p.m.
ABC	Fall	**Charlie's Angels**		Grey's Anatomy (21/7.6) (Tied with Hawaii Five-0)		Private Practice	
ABC	Late fall	Encore programming		Grey's Anatomy (21/7.6) (Tied with Hawaii Five-0)		Private Practice	
ABC	Winter	Wipeout		Grey's Anatomy (21/7.6) (Tied with Hawaii Five-0)		Private Practice	
ABC	Spring	**Missing**		Grey's Anatomy (21/7.6) (Tied with Hawaii Five-0)		Private Practice	
ABC	Mid-spring	**Missing**		Grey's Anatomy (21/7.6) (Tied with Hawaii Five-0)		**Scandal**	
ABC	Summer	**Duets**				Rookie Blue	
ABC	Mid-summer	**Duets**		Wipeout		Rookie Blue	
ABC	Late summer	Wipeout				Rookie Blue	
CBS	Fall	The Big Bang Theory (8/9.7)	**How to Be a Gentleman**	**Person of Interest** (12/9.0)		The Mentalist (9/9.3)	
CBS	Mid-fall	The Big Bang Theory (8/9.7)	Rules of Engagement	**Person of Interest** (12/9.0)		The Mentalist (9/9.3)	
CBS	Winter	The Big Bang Theory (8/9.7)	**Rob** (25/7.2) (Tied with Mike & Molly)	**Person of Interest** (12/9.0)		The Mentalist (9/9.3)	
CBS	Spring	The Big Bang Theory (8/9.7)	Rules of Engagement	**Person of Interest** (12/9.0)		The Mentalist (9/9.3)	
CBS	Summer	The Big Bang Theory (8/9.7)	Two and a Half Men (R)	Big Brother		**3**	
CBS	Late summer	The Big Bang Theory (8/9.7)	Two and a Half Men (R)	Big Brother		Encore programming	
The CW	Fall	The Vampire Diaries		**The Secret Circle**		Local programming	
The CW	Winter	The Vampire Diaries		**The Secret Circle**		Local programming	
The CW	Spring	The Vampire Diaries		**The Secret Circle**		Local programming	
The CW	Summer	**The Next: Fame Is at Your Doorstep**		**Breaking Pointe**		Local programming	
Fox	Fall	**The X Factor** (23/7.4)				Local programming	
Fox	Mid-fall	**The X Factor** (23/7.4)		Bones		Local programming	
Fox	Winter	American Idol (5/11.0)		**The Finder**		Local programming	
Fox	Spring	American Idol (5/11.0)		**Touch**		Local programming	
Fox	Summer	**Take Me Out**		**The Choice**		Local programming	
Fox	Mid-summer	Encore programming				Local programming	
NBC	Fall	Community	Parks and Recreation	The Office	**Whitney**	**Prime Suspect**	
NBC	Winter	30 Rock	Parks and Recreation	The Office	**Up All Night**	**The Firm**	
NBC	Spring	30 Rock	Parks and Recreation	The Office	**Up All Night**	**Awake**	
NBC	Mid-spring	Community	30 Rock	The Office	**Up All Night**	**Awake**	
NBC	Late spring	Community	30 Rock	The Office	Parks and Recreation	**Awake**	
NBC	Summer	Various programming		**Saving Hope**		**Rock Center with Brian Williams**	

== Friday ==
Network		8:00 p.m.	8:30 p.m.	9:00 p.m.	9:30 p.m.	10:00 p.m.	10:30 p.m.
ABC	Fall	Extreme Makeover: Home Edition				20/20	
ABC	Winter	Shark Tank		Primetime		20/20	
ABC	Spring	Shark Tank		Primetime		20/20	
ABC	Summer	Encore programming		20/20			
CBS	Fall	**A Gifted Man**		CSI: NY		Blue Bloods (19/7.8) (Tied with The Good Wife)	
CBS	Winter	Undercover Boss		**A Gifted Man**		Blue Bloods (19/7.8) (Tied with The Good Wife)	
CBS	Spring	Undercover Boss		CSI: NY		Blue Bloods (19/7.8) (Tied with The Good Wife)	
CBS	Summer	Undercover Boss		CSI: NY		Blue Bloods (19/7.8) (Tied with The Good Wife)	
The CW		Nikita		Supernatural		Local programming	
Fox	Fall	Kitchen Nightmares		Fringe		Local programming	
Fox	Winter	Kitchen Nightmares		Fringe		Local programming	
Fox	Spring	**The Finder**		Fringe		Local programming	
Fox	Summer	**The Finder**		Fringe		Local programming	
NBC	Fall	Chuck		**Grimm**		Dateline NBC	
NBC	Winter	Who Do You Think You Are?		**Grimm**		Dateline NBC	
NBC	Spring	Who Do You Think You Are?		**Grimm**		Dateline NBC	
NBC	Summer	Encore programming		Dateline NBC			
NBC	Mid-summer	Encore programming		**Grimm**		Dateline NBC	

== Saturday ==
Network		8:00 p.m.	8:30 p.m.	9:00 p.m.	9:30 p.m.	10:00 p.m.	10:30 p.m.
ABC	Fall	ESPN Saturday Night Football (continued to game completion)					
ABC	Winter	ABC Saturday Movie of the Week					
ABC	Spring	ABC Saturday Movie of the Week					
ABC	Summer	ABC Saturday Movie of the Week					
CBS	Fall	**Comedytime Saturday**		Crimetime Saturday		48 Hours	
CBS	Mid-fall	**Comedytime Saturday**	**How to Be a Gentleman**	Crimetime Saturday		48 Hours	
CBS	Follow-up	**Comedytime Saturday**		Crimetime Saturday		48 Hours	
CBS	Winter	**Comedytime Saturday**		Crimetime Saturday		48 Hours	
CBS	Spring	**Comedytime Saturday**	**How to Be a Gentleman**	Crimetime Saturday		48 Hours	
CBS	Summer	**NYC 22**				48 Hours	
CBS	Late summer	Crimetime Saturday				48 Hours	
Fox	Fall	COPS	COPS (R)	**Terra Nova** (R)		Local programming	
Fox	Winter	**Q'Viva! The Chosen**				Local programming	
Fox	Spring	Fox Sports programming				Local programming	
Fox	Late spring	**Baseball Night in America** (7:00 p.m.)				Local programming	
Fox	Summer	COPS (R)	COPS (R)	Mobbed (R)		Local programming	
NBC	Fall	Encore programming					
NBC	Winter	Encore programming		**The Firm**		Encore programming	
NBC	Spring	**Escape Routes**		**The Firm**		Encore programming	
NBC	Mid-spring	Encore programming		**The Firm**		Encore programming	
NBC	Summer	Various programming				**The Firm**	
NBC	Mid-summer	Various programming					

== By network ==
=== ABC ===
**Returning series**

- 20/20
- ABC Saturday Movie of the Week
- America's Funniest Home Videos
- The Bachelor
- Bachelor Pad
- The Bachelorette
- Body of Proof
- Castle
- Cougar Town
- Dancing with the Stars
- Desperate Housewives
- Extreme Makeover: Home Edition
- Grey's Anatomy
- Happy Endings
- The Middle
- Modern Family
- Primetime
- Primetime: What Would You Do?
- Private Practice
- Saturday Night Football
- Shark Tank
- Wife Swap
- Wipeout

**New series**

- **Charlie's Angels**
- **Don't Trust the B— in Apartment 23** *
- **Duets** *
- **Final Witness** *
- **GCB** *
- **The Glass House** *
- **Last Man Standing**
- **Man Up!**
- **Missing** *
- **NY Med** *
- **Once Upon a Time**
- **Pan Am**
- **Revenge**
- **The River** *
- **Scandal** *
- **Suburgatory**
- **Trust Us with Your Life** *
- **Work It** *
- **You Deserve It**

Not returning from 2010–11:

- 101 Ways to Leave a Game Show
- Better with You
- Brothers & Sisters
- Combat Hospital
- Detroit 1-8-7
- Expedition Impossible
- Jamie Oliver's Food Revolution
- Mr. Sunshine
- My Generation
- No Ordinary Family
- Off the Map
- Skating with the Stars
- Supernanny
- Take the Money and Run
- V
- The Whole Truth

=== CBS ===
**Returning series**

- 48 Hours
- 60 Minutes
- The Amazing Race
- The Big Bang Theory
- Blue Bloods
- Criminal Minds
- CSI: Crime Scene Investigation
- CSI: Miami
- CSI: NY
- The Good Wife
- Hawaii Five-0
- How I Met Your Mother
- The Mentalist
- Mike & Molly
- NCIS
- NCIS: Los Angeles
- Rules of Engagement
- Survivor
- Two and a Half Men
- Undercover Boss

**New series**

- **2 Broke Girls**
- **3** *
- **Dogs in the City** *
- **A Gifted Man**
- **How to Be a Gentleman**
- **NYC 22** *
- **Person of Interest**
- **¡Rob!** *
- **Unforgettable**

Not returning from 2010–11:

- $#*! My Dad Says
- CHAOS
- Criminal Minds: Suspect Behavior
- The Defenders
- Flashpoint (moved to Ion Television)
- Live to Dance
- Mad Love
- Medium

=== The CW ===
**Returning series**

- 90210
- America's Next Top Model
- Gossip Girl
- Nikita
- One Tree Hill
- Supernatural
- The Vampire Diaries

**New series**

- **Breaking Pointe** *
- **The Catalina** *
- **H8R**
- **Hart of Dixie**
- **The L.A. Complex** *
- **The Next: Fame Is at Your Doorstep** *
- **Oh Sit!** *
- **Remodeled** *
- **Ringer**
- **The Secret Circle**

Not returning from 2010–11:

- Hellcats
- Life Unexpected
- Shedding for the Wedding
- Smallville

=== Fox ===
**Returning series**

- American Dad!
- American Idol
- Bob's Burgers
- Bones
- Breaking In
- The Cleveland Show
- Cops
- Family Guy
- Fringe
- Glee
- Hell's Kitchen
- House
- Kitchen Nightmares
- MasterChef
- Mobbed
- NFL on Fox
- Raising Hope
- The Simpsons
- So You Think You Can Dance

**New series**

- **Alcatraz** *
- **Allen Gregory** *
- **Baseball Night in America** *
- **The Choice** *
- **The Finder** *
- **I Hate My Teenage Daughter**
- **Hotel Hell** *
- **Napoleon Dynamite** *
- **New Girl**
- **Q'Viva! The Chosen** *
- **Take Me Out** *
- **Terra Nova**
- **Touch** *
- **The X Factor**

Not returning from 2010–11:

- America's Most Wanted (moved to Lifetime; returned to Fox in 2020–21)
- The Chicago Code
- The Good Guys
- Human Target
- Lie to Me
- Lone Star
- Million Dollar Money Drop
- Running Wilde (burned off on FX)
- Traffic Light

=== NBC ===
**Returning series**

- 30 Rock
- The Apprentice
- The Biggest Loser
- Chuck
- Community
- Dateline NBC
- Fear Factor (Note: Series revival, previously aired by NBC from 2001–06.)
- Football Night in America
- Harry's Law
- Law & Order: Special Victims Unit
- Love in the Wild
- NBC Sunday Night Football
- The Office
- Parenthood
- Parks and Recreation
- The Sing-Off
- The Voice
- Who Do You Think You Are?

**New series**

- **Are You There, Chelsea?** *
- **Awake** *
- **Bent** *
- **Best Friends Forever** *
- **Betty White's Off Their Rockers** *
- **Escape Routes** *
- **Fashion Star** *
- **The Firm** *
- **Free Agents**
- **Grimm**
- **Maid in Manhattan**
- **The Playboy Club**
- **Prime Suspect**
- **Rock Center with Brian Williams**
- **Smash** *
- **Stars Earn Stripes** *
- **Up All Night**
- **Whitney**
- **Who's Still Standing?**

Not returning from 2010–11:

- America's Next Great Restaurant
- The Cape (burned off on NBC.com)
- Chase
- The Event
- Law & Order: LA
- Outlaw
- Outsourced
- The Paul Reiser Show
- Perfect Couples
- School Pride
- Undercovers

== Renewals and cancellations ==
=== Full season pickups ===
==== ABC ====
- Happy Endings—Picked up for a full season on November 3, 2011.
- Last Man Standing—Picked up for a full season on November 3, 2011.
- Once Upon a Time—Picked up for a full season on November 3, 2011.
- Revenge—Picked up for a full season on October 13, 2011.
- Shark Tank—Picked up two additional episodes, totaling to 15 episodes on February 28, 2012.
- Suburgatory—Picked up for a full season on October 13, 2011.

==== CBS ====
- 2 Broke Girls—Picked up for a full season on October 5, 2011.
- Person of Interest—Picked up for a full season on October 25, 2011.
- Unforgettable—Picked up for a full season on October 25, 2011.

==== The CW ====
- Hart of Dixie—Picked up for a full season on October 12, 2011.
- Ringer—Picked up for a full season on October 12, 2011.
- The Secret Circle—Picked up for a full season on October 12, 2011.

==== Fox ====
- New Girl—Picked up for 24 episodes on September 28, 2011.

==== NBC ====
- Grimm—Picked up for a full season on November 21, 2011.
- Harry's Law—Picked up for a full season on January 6, 2012.
- Up All Night—Picked up for a full season on October 4, 2011, plus an additional 2 episodes on November 21, 2011.
- Whitney—Picked up for a full season on October 4, 2011.

=== Renewals ===
==== ABC ====
- 20/20—Announced on the 2012/13 schedule for a thirty-fifth season on May 15, 2012.
- America's Funniest Home Videos—Picked up for a twenty-third season on May 11, 2012.
- The Bachelor—Picked up for a seventeenth cycle on May 10, 2012.
- Body of Proof—Picked up for a third season on May 11, 2012.
- Castle—Picked up for a fifth season on May 10, 2012.
- Dancing with the Stars—Picked up for a fifteenth cycle on May 10, 2012.
- Don't Trust the B— in Apartment 23—Picked up for a second season on May 11, 2012.
- Grey's Anatomy—Picked up for a ninth season on May 10, 2012.
- Happy Endings—Picked up for a third season on May 11, 2012.
- Last Man Standing—Picked up for a second season on May 11, 2012.
- The Middle—Picked up for a fourth season on May 10, 2012.
- Modern Family—Picked up for a fourth season on May 10, 2012.
- Once Upon a Time—Picked up for a second season on May 10, 2012.
- Primetime—Announced on the 2012/13 schedule for a twenty-fourth season on May 15, 2012.
- Private Practice—Picked up for a sixth and final season on May 11, 2012.
- Revenge—Picked up for a second season on May 10, 2012.
- Saturday Night Football—Announced on the 2012/13 schedule for a seventh season on May 15, 2012.
- Scandal—Picked up for a second season on May 11, 2012.
- Shark Tank—Picked up for a fourth season on May 10, 2012.
- Suburgatory—Picked up for a second season on May 10, 2012.
- Wife Swap—Picked up for an eighth season on May 11, 2012.

==== CBS ====
- 2 Broke Girls—Picked up for a second season on March 14, 2012.
- 48 Hours—Picked up for a twenty-fifth season on March 14, 2012.
- 60 Minutes—Picked up for a forty-fifth season on March 14, 2012.
- The Amazing Race—Picked up for a twenty-first cycle on March 14, 2012.
- The Big Bang Theory—Picked up for two additional seasons on January 12, 2011, running through its seventh season in 2013/14.
- Blue Bloods—Picked up for a third season on March 14, 2012.
- Criminal Minds—Picked up for an eighth season on March 14, 2012.
- CSI: Crime Scene Investigation—Picked up for a thirteenth season on March 14, 2012.
- CSI: NY—Picked up for a ninth season on May 13, 2012.
- The Good Wife—Picked up for a fourth season on March 14, 2012.
- Hawaii Five-0—Picked up for a third season on March 14, 2012.
- How I Met Your Mother—Picked up for an eighth season on March 4, 2011.
- The Mentalist—Picked up for a fifth season on March 14, 2012.
- Mike & Molly—Picked up for a third season on March 14, 2012.
- NCIS—Picked up for a tenth season on March 14, 2012.
- NCIS: Los Angeles—Picked up for a fourth season on March 14, 2012.
- Person of Interest—Picked up for a second season on March 14, 2012.
- Rules of Engagement—Picked up for a seventh season on May 21, 2012.
- Survivor—Picked up for two more cycles in the 2012/13 season on November 17, 2011.
- Two and a Half Men—Picked up for a tenth season on May 12, 2012, which is fully recovered from the firing of star Charlie Sheen.
- Undercover Boss—Picked up for a fourth season on March 14, 2012.
- Unforgettable—Revived for a second season on June 29, 2012.

==== The CW ====
- 90210—Picked up for a fifth season on May 3, 2012.
- America's Next Top Model—Picked up for a nineteenth cycle on February 21, 2012.
- Gossip Girl—Picked up for a sixth and final season on May 11, 2012.
- Hart of Dixie—Picked up for a second season on May 11, 2012.
- Nikita—Picked up for a third season on May 11, 2012.
- Supernatural—Picked up for an eighth season on May 3, 2012.
- The Vampire Diaries—Picked up for a fourth season on May 3, 2012.

==== Fox ====
- American Dad!—Picked up for a seventh production cycle on February 23, 2011.
- American Idol—Announced on the 2012/13 schedule for a twelfth season on May 14, 2012.
- Bob's Burgers—On October 31, 2011, Fox ordered 9 additional episodes to the second production cycle, leaving some episodes out, airing in the 2012/13 season.
- Bones—Picked up for an eighth season on March 29, 2012.
- The Cleveland Show—Picked up for a fourth season on May 9, 2011.
- Family Guy—Picked up for an eleventh season on May 9, 2011.
- Fringe—Picked up for a fifth and final season on April 26, 2012.
- Glee—Picked up for a fourth season on April 9, 2012.
- Kitchen Nightmares—Picked up for a fifth production cycle on February 2, 2012.
- Mobbed—Announced on the 2012/13 schedule for more specials on May 14, 2012.
- New Girl—Picked up for a second season on April 9, 2012.
- Raising Hope—Picked up for a third season on April 9, 2012.
- The Simpsons—Picked up for a twenty-third production cycle on November 11, 2010, plus an additional extension through its twenty-fifth production cycle in 2013/14.
- Touch—Picked up for a second season on May 9, 2012.
- The X Factor—Picked up for a second season on November 2, 2011.

==== Ion Television ====
- Flashpoint—Picked up for a fifth season on January 3, 2012.

==== NBC ====
- 30 Rock—Picked up for a seventh and final season on May 10, 2012.
- The Apprentice—Announced on the 2012/13 schedule for a thirteenth cycle on May 13, 2012.
- Betty White's Off Their Rockers—Announced on the 2012/13 schedule for a second season on May 13, 2012.
- The Biggest Loser—Announced on the 2012/13 schedule for a fourteenth cycle on May 13, 2012.
- Community—Picked up for a fourth season on May 10, 2012.
- Dateline NBC—Announced on the 2012/13 schedule for a twenty-second season on May 13, 2012.
- Fashion Star—Picked up for a second season on May 11, 2012.
- Football Night in America—On August 19, 2009, NBC announced they will extend NFL on NBC through 2013, plus an additional extension through 2022 on December 14, 2011.
- Grimm—Picked up for a second season on March 16, 2012.
- Law & Order: Special Victims Unit—Picked up for a fourteenth season on May 9, 2012.
- NBC Sunday Night Football—On August 19, 2009, NBC announced they will extend NFL on NBC through 2013, plus an additional extension through 2022 on December 14, 2011.
- The Office—Picked up for a ninth and final season on May 11, 2012.
- Parenthood—Picked up for a fourth season on May 10, 2012.
- Parks and Recreation—Picked up for a fifth season on May 11, 2012.
- Rock Center with Brian Williams—Announced on the 2012/13 schedule for a second season on May 13, 2012.
- Smash—Picked up for a second season on March 22, 2012.
- Up All Night—Picked up for a second season on May 11, 2012.
- The Voice—Announced on the 2012/13 schedule for a third season on May 13, 2012.
- Whitney—Picked up for a second season on May 11, 2012.

=== Cancellations/Series endings ===
==== ABC ====
- Bachelor Pad—It was announced on March 16, 2013, that would not pick for the fourth season.
- Charlie's Angels—Canceled on October 14, 2011, after seven low rated episodes. The remaining episodes aired through November 10, 2011.
- Cougar Town—It was announced on May 10, 2012, that TBS would carry future seasons of the series, ending its run on ABC.
- Desperate Housewives—It was announced on August 5, 2011, that season eight would be the final season. The series concluded on May 13, 2012.
- Extreme Makeover: Home Edition—Canceled as a regular series on December 15, 2011. The series finale aired on January 13, 2012. Moved to HGTV in 2020. On June 7, 2023, it was announced that the show would later return to ABC in the 2024-25 schedule.
- GCB—Canceled on May 11, 2012.
- Man Up!—Canceled on December 8, 2011, after eight low rated episodes. The 5 remaining episodes were moved to ABC's online website.
- Missing—Canceled on May 11, 2012.
- Pan Am—Canceled on May 11, 2012.
- The River—Canceled on May 11, 2012.
- Work It—Canceled on January 13, 2012, due to low ratings, harsh reviews and controversy after airing only 2 episodes.
- You Deserve It—Canceled on May 15, 2012.

==== CBS ====
- CSI: Miami—Canceled on May 13, 2012, after ten seasons. The series was credited as a key player in the network's ratings rise. This is the first CSI series to be canceled.
- A Gifted Man—Canceled on May 12, 2012.
- How to Be a Gentleman—Canceled, cut back from 13 episodes to 9 episodes, and changed the airdate from Thursdays to Saturdays for the remaining episodes on October 7, 2011, after only 2 episodes airing. The series was later pulled from Saturdays on October 18, 2011, after only one episode airing on Saturday.
- NYC 22—Canceled on May 13, 2012.
- Rob—Canceled on May 13, 2012.

==== The CW ====
- H8R—Canceled on October 6, 2011, after four low rated episodes.
- One Tree Hill—It was announced on May 19, 2011, that season nine would be the final season. The series concluded on April 4, 2012.
- Remodeled—Canceled on February 9, 2012, after four low rated episodes. The remaining episodes aired through between February 22; and the last two episodes were August 13 and 20, 2012.
- Ringer—Canceled on May 11, 2012.
- The Secret Circle—Canceled on May 11, 2012.

==== Fox ====
- Alcatraz—Canceled on May 9, 2012.
- Allen Gregory—Canceled on January 8, 2012.
- Breaking In—Officially canceled on May 10, 2012.
- The Finder—Canceled on May 9, 2012.
- House—It was announced on February 8, 2012, that season eight would be the final season. The series concluded on May 21, 2012.
- I Hate My Teenage Daughter—Canceled on May 10, 2012.
- Napoleon Dynamite—Canceled on May 14, 2012.
- Q'Viva! The Chosen—Canceled on May 14, 2012.
- Terra Nova—Canceled on March 5, 2012, but being shopped to other networks.

==== NBC ====
- Are You There, Chelsea?—Canceled on May 11, 2012.
- Awake—Canceled on May 11, 2012.
- Bent—Canceled on May 11, 2012.
- Best Friends Forever—Canceled on May 11, 2012.
- Chuck—It was announced on May 15, 2011, that season five would be the final season. The series concluded on January 27, 2012.
- Escape Routes—Canceled on May 13, 2012.
- Fear Factor—Canceled on May 13, 2012. Was revived for MTV in May 2017.
- The Firm—Canceled on May 13, 2012.
- Free Agents—Canceled on October 6, 2011, after four low rated episodes.
- Harry's Law—Canceled on May 11, 2012, after two seasons.
- The Playboy Club—Canceled on October 4, 2011, after three low rated episodes. This was the first cancellation of the season.
- Prime Suspect—Canceled on January 5, 2012.
- The Sing-Off—Canceled on May 13, 2012. Renewed for a fourth season on March 14, 2013.
- Who Do You Think You Are?—Canceled on May 13, 2012. Moved to TLC in July 2013. The series later returned to NBC in the 2021-22 schedule.
- Who's Still Standing?—Canceled on May 13, 2012.

== See also ==
- 2011–12 United States network television schedule (daytime)
- 2011–12 United States network television schedule (late night)

== Top weekly ratings ==
- Data sources: AC Nielsen, TV by the Numbers

=== Total Viewers ===
Week	Name	Viewers (in millions)	Network
August 29 – September 4	America's Got Talent 8/30	11.14	NBC
September 5 – September 11	NFL Thursday Night Opener: New Orleans Saints at Green Bay Packers	27.17	NBC
September 12 – September 18	Sunday Night Football: Philadelphia Eagles at Atlanta Falcons	23.42	NBC
September 19 – September 25	Two And A Half Men	28.74	CBS
September 26 – October 2	Two And A Half Men	20.53	CBS
October 3 – October 9	Sunday Night Football: Green Bay Packers at Atlanta Falcons	22.05	NBC
October 10 – October 16	NCIS	18.98	CBS
October 17 – October 23	NCIS	19.41	CBS
October 24 – October 30	2011 World Series Game 7: Texas Rangers at St. Louis Cardinals	25.40	FOX
October 31 – November 6	Sunday Night Football: Baltimore Ravens at Pittsburgh Steelers	22.12	NBC
November 7 – November 13	Sunday Night Football: New England Patriots at New York Jets	20.92	NBC
November 14 – November 20	Sunday Night Football: Philadelphia Eagles at New York Giants	20.31	NBC
November 21 – November 27	Sunday Night Football: Pittsburgh Steelers at Kansas City Chiefs	20.34	NBC
November 28 – December 4	The OT	19.39	FOX
December 5 – December 11	Sunday Night Football: New York Giants at Dallas Cowboys	24.52	NBC
December 12 – December 18	NCIS	19.13	CBS
December 19 – December 25	Sunday Night Football: Chicago Bears at Green Bay Packers	24.02	NBC
December 26 – January 1	Sunday Night Football: Dallas Cowboys at New York Giants	27.62	NBC
January 2 – January 8	NFC Wild Card Playoff: Detroit Lions at New Orleans Saints	31.78	NBC
January 9 – January 15	AFC Divisional Playoff: Denver Broncos at New England Patriots	34.20	CBS
January 16 – January 22	NFC Championship Game: New York Giants at San Francisco 49ers	57.64	FOX
January 23 – January 29	American Idol 1/25	19.67	FOX
January 30 – February 5	Super Bowl XLVI: New York Giants vs. New England Patriots	111.35	NBC
February 6 – February 12	54th Grammy Awards	39.91	CBS
February 13 – February 19	NCIS	19.59	CBS
February 20 – February 26	84th Academy Awards	39.34	ABC
February 27 – March 4	American Idol 3/1	18.45	FOX
March 5 – March 11	American Idol 3/7	18.69	FOX
March 12 – March 18	American Idol 3/14	18.38	FOX
March 19 – March 25	NCIS	19.06	CBS
March 26 – April 1	NCIS	18.62	CBS
April 2 – April 8	2012 Final Four National Championship: Kansas vs. Kentucky	20.87	CBS
April 9 – April 15	NCIS	17.66	CBS
April 16 – April 22	NCIS	18.08	CBS
April 23 – April 29	Dancing with the Stars 4/23	17.62	ABC
April 30 – May 6	NCIS	17.58	CBS
May 7 – May 13	NCIS	18.20	CBS
May 14 – May 20	NCIS	19.05	CBS
May 21 – May 27	American Idol 5/23	21.49	FOX
May 28 – June 3	America's Got Talent 5/29	11.51	NBC
June 4 – June 10	America's Got Talent 6/5	12.55	NBC
June 11 – June 17	2012 NBA Finals Game 2: Miami Heat at Oklahoma City Thunder	16.67	ABC
June 18 – June 24	2012 NBA Finals Game 5: Oklahoma City Thunder at Miami Heat	18.46	ABC
June 25 – July 1	America's Got Talent 6/26	11.67	NBC
July 2 – July 8	America's Got Talent 7/2	10.40	NBC
July 9 – July 15	2012 Major League Baseball All-Star Game	10.90	FOX
July 16 – July 22	America's Got Talent 7/17	10.17	NBC
July 23 – July 29	2012 Summer Olympics Opening Ceremonies	40.65	NBC
July 30 – August 5	2012 Summer Olympics Day 4	38.72	NBC
August 6 – August 12	2012 Summer Olympics Closing Ceremonies	31.01	NBC
August 13 – August 19	America's Got Talent 8/14	9.97	NBC
August 20 – August 26	America's Got Talent 8/21	9.90	NBC

=== 18–49 Viewers ===
Week	Name	Viewers (in millions)	Network
August 29 – September 4	Big Brother 13 8/31	3.3	CBS
September 5 – September 11	NFL Thursday Night Opener: New Orleans Saints at Green Bay Packers	10.9	NBC
September 12 – September 18	Sunday Night Football: Philadelphia Eagles at Atlanta Falcons	10.0	NBC
September 19 – September 25	Two And A Half Men	10.7	CBS
September 26 – October 2	Sunday Night Football: New York Jets at Baltimore Ravens	7.7	NBC
October 3 – October 9	Sunday Night Football: Green Bay Packers at Atlanta Falcons	8.9	NBC
October 10 – October 16	Sunday Night Football: Minnesota Vikings at Chicago Bears	6.6	NBC
October 17 – October 23	Modern Family	5.7	ABC
October 24 – October 30	Sunday Night Football: Dallas Cowboys at Philadelphia Eagles	9.3	NBC
October 31 – November 6	Sunday Night Football: Baltimore Ravens at Pittsburgh Steelers	8.8	NBC
November 7 – November 13	Sunday Night Football: New England Patriots at New York Jets	8.1	NBC
November 14 – November 20	Sunday Night Football: Philadelphia Eagles at New York Giants	7.6	NBC
November 21 – November 27	Sunday Night Football: Pittsburgh Steelers at Kansas City Chiefs	7.9	NBC
November 28 – December 4	The OT	7.4	FOX
December 3 – December 9	Sunday Night Football: New York Giants at Dallas Cowboys	9.4	NBC
December 12 – December 18	Sunday Night Football: Baltimore Ravens at San Diego Chargers	6.1	NBC
December 19 – December 25	Sunday Night Football: Chicago Bears at Green Bay Packers	7.7	NBC
December 26 – January 1	Sunday Night Football: Dallas Cowboys at New York Giants	9.8	NBC
January 2 – January 8	NFC Wild Card Playoff: Detroit Lions at New Orleans Saints	11.3	NBC
January 9 – January 15	AFC Divisional Playoff: Denver Broncos at New England Patriots	12.5	CBS
January 16 – January 22	NFC Championship Game: New York Giants at San Francisco 49ers	21.4	FOX
January 23 – January 29	American Idol 1/25	6.5	FOX
January 30 – February 5	Super Bowl XLVI: New York Giants vs. New England Patriots	40.5	NBC
February 6 – February 12	54th Grammy Awards	14.1	CBS
February 13 – February 19	American Idol 2/15	6.1	FOX
February 20 – February 26	84th Academy Awards	11.7	ABC
February 27 – March 4	The Voice	5.4	NBC
March 5 – March 11	The Voice	6.2	NBC
March 12 – March 18	American Idol 3/14	5.4	FOX
March 19 – March 25	American Idol 3/21	5.1	FOX
March 26 – April 1	2012 Final Four National Semifinal: Kansas vs. Ohio State	5.5	CBS
April 2 – April 8	2012 Final Four National Championship: Kansas vs. Kentucky	7.6	CBS
April 9 – April 15	American Idol 4/11	5.0	FOX
April 16 – April 22	American Idol 4/18	4.8	FOX
April 23 – April 29	American Idol 4/25	4.8	FOX
April 30 – May 6	The Big Bang Theory	4.7	CBS
May 7 – May 13	American Idol 5/9	4.5	FOX
May 14 – May 20	American Idol 5/16	4.9	FOX
May 21 – May 27	American Idol 5/23	6.4	FOX
May 28 – June 3	America's Got Talent 5/29	3.7	NBC
June 4 – June 10	America's Got Talent 6/5	3.5	NBC
June 11 – June 17	2012 NBA Finals Game 2: Miami Heat at Oklahoma City Thunder	7.1	ABC
June 18 – June 24	2012 NBA Finals Game 5: Oklahoma City Thunder at Miami Heat	7.6	ABC
June 25 – July 1	2012 U.S. Olympic Trials: Gymnastics Final	3.3	NBC
July 2 – July 8	America's Got Talent 7/2	3.0	NBC
July 9 – July 15	2012 Major League Baseball All-Star Game	3.2	FOX
July 16 – July 22	The Bachelorette 7/22	3.1	ABC
July 23 – July 29	2012 Summer Olympics Opening Ceremonies	12.2	NBC
July 30 – August 5	2012 Summer Olympics Day 4	12.8	NBC
August 6 – August 12	2012 Summer Olympics Day 11	9.6	NBC
August 13 – August 19	NFL Preseason Football: Indianapolis Colts at Pittsburgh Steelers	3.2	NBC
August 20 – August 26	NFL Preseason Football: Carolina Panthers at New York Jets	3.3	NBC
