= Vietnam's Got Talent season 1 =

Vietnam's Got Talent
- Season 1
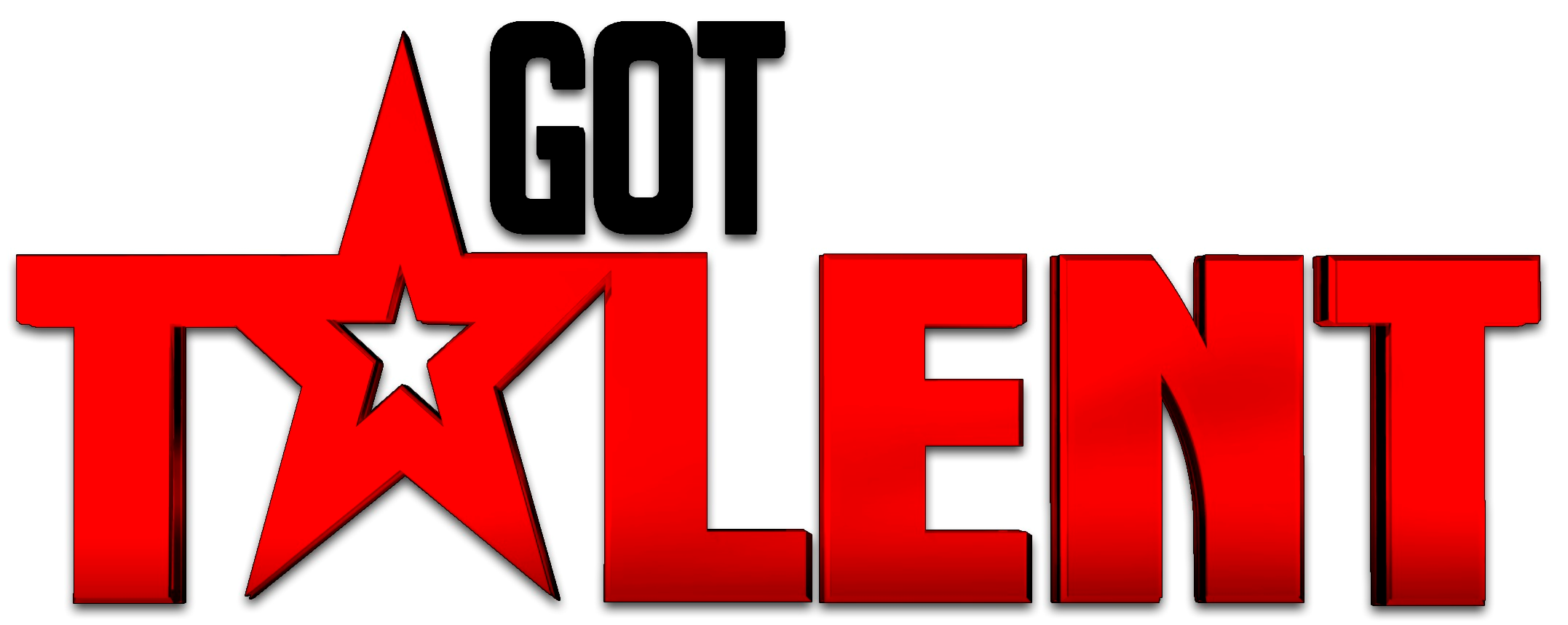
- Hosted by: Chi Bảo; Quyền Linh
- Judges: Nguyễn Thành Lộc; Bùi Thúy Hạnh; Huy Tuấn
- Winners: Đăng Quân & Bảo Ngọc
- Runner-up: Nguyễn Hương Thảo

Release
- Original network: VTV; MTV Vietnam
- Original release: December 18, 2011 – May 6, 2012

Season chronology
- Next → Season 2

The first season of Vietnam's Got Talent, a Vietnamese reality television talent show, aired Sunday nights at 9:00PM (UTC+7) between December 18, 2011 and May 6, 2012 on VTV3 and MTV Vietnam. The show was based on the Got Talent series format that originated by Simon Cowell in the United Kingdom. Artist Thành Lộc was the first host to be announced. Shortly thereafter, Thúy Hạnh confirmed her role at the judges' table. Huy Tuấn was given the 3rd spot of the judges' table. The show was presented by Chi Bảo and Quyền Linh.

The show was primarily produced by Vietnam Television and BHD Corp, with additional broadcasting by MTV Vietnam. The performance shows were aired Sundays on VTV3 while result shows were aired on VTV2 the following Tuesday.

== Summary ==
Vietnam's Got Talent is a talent show that features singers, dancers, magicians, comedians, martial-art players, performers with risky weapons/tools/elements, variety acts and other performers of all ages competing for a grand prize of 400,000,000 VND (approximately $20,000).

The first season ran for 26 episodes. The producers chose the top 360 auditioning acts for taped auditions. These were subsequently cut down to 140 by an additional round of auditions consisting of the traditional "Yes" and "No" vote by a panel of three judges. The judges then chose their favourite 49 acts for advancement into the live semi-final rounds, from which the top two acts of each semi-final advanced to two final rounds consisting of 7 acts each, from which 2 acts per final round, one by televote and one by judges' vote, advanced to a grand finale.

== Auditions ==
Auditions were initially held in 8 major cities. Afterwards, the producers announced that the auditions, dubbed Golden Chances, would be held in rural areas by way of a bus tour. The best two acts from each rural area and the best 5 acts from Ho Chi Minh City and Hanoi respectively advance to the second round of auditions.

Region	Date		Venue	Date	Venue
Region	Open audition	Call-back	Venue	Golden chance	Venue
Long An	October 30, 2011	N/A	Gymnasium of Long An	N/A	N/A
Cần Thơ	November 1, 2011	N/A	Diamond Palace	N/A	N/A
Ho Chi Minh City	Nov. 4–6, 2011	Dec. 10–14, 2011	Army Theater	Dec. 10–11, 2011	Metro An Phú
Buon Me Thuot	November 10, 2011	N/A	Hoàng Lộc Hotel, Buôn Mê Thuột City	N/A	N/A
Danang	November 13, 2011	N/A	Cultural Center of Da Nang	N/A	N/A
Haiphong	November 16, 2011	N/A	Haiphong Gymnasium	N/A	N/A
Quảng Ninh	November 18, 2011	N/A	Nguyễn Văn Cừ Gymnasium, Halong City	N/A	N/A
Lạng Sơn	November 20, 2011	N/A	Children's Palace	N/A	N/A
Hanoi	Nov. 24–26, 2011	Dec. 3–6, 2011	The Garden Mall	Dec. 17–18, 2011	Metro Thăng Long
Bình Dương	N/A	N/A	N/A	November 28, 2011	N/A
Đồng Nai	N/A	N/A	N/A	November 29, 2011	N/A
Vũng Tàu	N/A	N/A	N/A	December 2, 2011	N/A
Tiền Giang	N/A	N/A	N/A	December 6, 2011	N/A
Bến Tre	N/A	N/A	N/A	December 9, 2011	N/A
Vĩnh Long	N/A	N/A	N/A	December 12, 2011	N/A
Hậu Giang	N/A	N/A	N/A	December 15, 2011	N/A
An Giang	N/A	N/A	N/A	December 18, 2011	N/A
Cà Mau	N/A	N/A	N/A	December 23, 2011	N/A

== Process ==
=== Producers' auditions ===
Televised producers' auditions for the first episode were held in Ho Chi Minh City, Long An, Cần Thơ, Buôn Ma Thuột, and Da Nang. Episode 2 was to feature auditions held in Hanoi, Lạng Sơn, Haiphong and Quảng Ninh. Untelevised producers' auditions were also held in nine rural areas; Bình Dương, Đồng Nai, Vũng Tàu, Tiền Giang, Bến Tre, Vĩnh Long, Hậu Giang, An Giang, Cà Mau, as well as Hanoi & Ho Chi Minh City. Due to disappointing viewing figures for the premiere episode, the airing of the second episode was replaced by the preliminary auditions.

=== Preliminary auditions ===
Key	Buzzed out	Judges agreed	Judges culled	Judges' cull candidate

Ep.	Artist(s) Origin, Age	Act	Category	Buzzes and judges' choices			
Ep.	Artist(s) Origin, Age	Act	Category	Thành Lộc	Thúy Hạnh	Huy Tuấn	Guest judge
2	Nguyễn Trường Giang; Hanoi, 23	Silent comedy/Popping	Comedy/Dancing				---
2	Nguyễn Thùy Trang; Haiphong, 16	Comedy	Comedy				---
2	Nông Văn Thịnh; Cao Bằng, 23	Freestyle football	Performing				---
2	Phạm Hải Đăng; Hanoi, tba	Harmonicist/Singing	Singing				---
2	Làng Then string orchestra Bắc Giang	Violists/Orchestra	Music				---
2	Trương Văn Hoàng; Haiphong, 22	Child singing	Singing				---
2	Vũ Khánh Vân; Hanoi, 24	Singing	Singing				---
2	Nguyễn Văn Thịnh; Hanoi, 26	Martial artist	Performing				---
2	Lê Nhật Anh; Hanoi, 19	Qigong	Performing				---
2	Lê Vũ Thùy Dương; Haiphong, 12	Belly dance	Dancing				---
2	Bùi Trọng Dư; Haiphong, 27	Singing/guitarist	Singing				---
2	Nguyễn Hoàng Anh; Haiphong, 8	Child singing/Choreography	Singing/Dancing				---
3	Sadie (group); Hanoi, various	Belly dance	Dancing				---
3	Trần Văn Thương; Hanoi, 22	Singing/Organist	Singing				---
3	Nguyễn Đăng Quân; Hanoi, 11; Trần Bảo Ngọc; Hanoi, 6	Choreography	Dancing				---
3	Classic SMS (group); Hanoi, various	Singing	Singing			N/A	---
3	Nguyễn Việt; Hanoi, 55	Singing	Singing		N/A		---
3	Vũ Song Vũ; Haiphong, 13	Singing	Singing				---
3	Vũ Trọng Khanh; Haiphong, 21	Singing	Singing				---
3	Trần Thu Hiền; Hanoi, 30	Singing	Singing			N/A	---
3	Nguyễn Xuân Trung; Hanoi, 33	Singing	Singing				---
3	Bubbles Family (group); Haiphong, various	Parkour	Performing				---
3	HP Team (group); Haiphong, 10–26	Dancesport	Dancing				---
4	Nguyễn Văn Bốn; Hanoi, 71	Gymnastics	Performing				---
4	Nguyễn Tuấn Anh; Haiphong, 39	Singing	Singing				---
4	Dương Mạnh Hòa; Hanoi, 21	Popping	Dancing				---
4	Trần Hoàng Hà; Hanoi, 13	Singing/Guitarist	Singing			---	
4	Nguyễn Hữu Tùng; Bắc Ninh, 17	Singing/Illusionist	Singing			---	
4	Nguyễn Thị Thanh Nhàn; Quảng Ninh	Comedy	Comedy			---	
4	Nguyễn Xuân Quỳnh tba, 18	Belly dance/Singing	Dancing			---	
4	Vũ Phạm Ngọc Tân; Thanh Hóa, 32	Illusionist	Performing			---	
4	Nguyễn Thanh Bình; Quảng Ninh, 24	Instrumentalist	Music			---	
4	The Family (group)	Ballroom dance	Dancing			---	
4	Old man	Instrumentalist	Music			---	
4	Đỗ Mạnh Tráng; Hanoi, 25	Rapping	Singing			---	
5	Vũ Hoàng Minh Anh tba, 8 Vũ Hoàng Anh Minh tba, 13	Dancing/Illusionist	Dancing				---
5	Energy (group); Hanoi	Breakdance	Performing				---
5	Nguyễn Hương Thảo; Hanoi, 22	Musical	Singing				---
5	ATW (group); Hanoi,	Freestyle football	Performing				---
5	Lê Đức Kiểm; Nam Định, 42	Singing	Singing				---
5	Trần Quang Linh; Hanoi, 21	Singing	Singing				---
5	Diệp Thị Dung; Quảng Ninh, 15	Singing	Singing			N/A	---
5	Ngô Minh Tú; Hanoi, 21	Bike trials	Performing				---
5	Nguyễn Gia Linh (twins); Nguyễn Song Linh; Hanoi, 14	Mixed dance	Dancing				---
5	Vũ Ngọc Quang (duo); Bùi Thị Bích; Quảng Ninh, 19	Dancing	Dancing				---
5	Đoàn Thị Thảo (duo); Nguyễn Thị Trinh; Haiphong, 19	Comedian	Performing				---
5	Nguyễn Trường Xuân; Hanoi, 13	Ballerina	Dancing	N/A			---
5	Nguyễn Quý Anh; Hanoi, 12	Singing	Singing				---
5	Nguyễn Anh Tú; Hanoi, 26	Dancing	Dancing			N/A	---
5	Lê Minh Quân; Hanoi, 15	Dancing	Dancing				---
5	Ngô Văn Diễn; Haiphong, 23	Singing/Dancing	Singing				---
5	Trần My Anh; Hanoi, 11	Singing/Guitarist	Singing				---
6	Mix Crew (group); HCMC	Dancing	Dancing				---
6	Focus (group); HCMC	Yo-yoist/Dancing	Performing				---
6	Trương Thanh; HCMC, 40	Fan dancer	Performing	N/A	N/A	N/A	---
6	H'Youm Me; Đắk Lắk, 42	Singing	Singing				---
6	Khổng Tất Ứng; Tiến Giang, 73; Nguyễn Thị Ngày; Tiền Giang, 70	Ballroom dancer/singing	Performing	N/A	N/A	N/A	---
6	Nguyễn Thị Thanh Trúc; Quảng Ngãi, 8	Singing	Singing				---
6	Mạc Tuấn Thanh; HCMC, 27	Singing	Singing				---
6	Bành Đức Hoài Yến; HCMC, 29	Belly dance	Dancing				---
6	Nguyễn Anh Tâm; Quảng Nam, 25	Martial artist	Performing	N/A	N/A	N/A	---
6	Phạm Thị Song Thư (twins); Phạm Thị Song Thảo; Quảng Nam, 22	Singing/Folk dance	Singing				---
6	Nguyễn Hoàng Tú; HCMC, 17	Eating live mudskipper	Performing	N/A	N/A	N/A	---
6	Phạm Minh Trí; Quảng Ngãi, 28	Singing	Singing				---
6	Ivoice (group); HCMC, 17	Acapella	Singing				---
7	Nguyễn Đặng Đăng Khoa; Cà Mau, 10	Dancing	Dancing				---
7	Đinh Thiện Nhân; HCMC, 24	Opera	Singing				---
7	Nguyễn Thanh Lang; HCMC, 40	Singing/Dancing	Singing		N/A		---
7	Nguyễn Đức Nhã; HCMC, 19	Singing	Singing			N/A	---
7	PS (group); HCMC	Dancing	Dancing				---
7	Phạm Trần Phương; HCMC, 20	Singing	Singing				---
7	Trần Văn Phúc; HCMC, 52	Drama	Performing	N/A	N/A	N/A	---
7	Nguyễn Mai Nguyên Huy; Nha Trang, 28	Illusionist	Performing				---
7	Nguyễn Thị An; HCMC, 20	Limbo-dancer	Dancing				---
7	Nguyễn Vũ Huy; Da Nang, 26	Singing	Singing			N/A	---
7	Trần Thái Sơn; Quảng Trị, 20		Performing				---
7	Lê Nguyễn Quỳnh Anh; HCMC, 15	Singing	Singing		N/A		---
7	Võ Trọng Phúc; HCMC, 26	Singing	Singing				---
8	Nguyễn Lê Nguyên; Dalat, 11	Singing	Singing	N/A			---
8	Freaky Funk Crew (group); HCMC	Popping	Dancing				---
8	Đinh Ngọc Hoàng; Dongnai, 20	Singing	Singing				---
8	Bùi Khánh; HCMC, 49	Exercising	Performing	N/A	N/A	N/A	---
8	Nguyễn Phúc Gia Huy; HCMC, 28	Stand-up comedian	Performing				---
8	Y'Roc; Đắk Nông	Singing	Singing				---
8	Nguyễn Cường; HCMC	Beatboxing	Performing				---
8	Vũ Xuân Thùy; HCMC	Bollywood dance	Dancing	N/A	N/A	N/A	---
8	Nguyễn Xuân Lân; HCMC, 22	Singing	Singing				---
8	Tia chớp/U.P Style (group); HCMC	Popping	Dancing		N/A	N/A	---
8	Hoàng Tú Linh; HCMC, 22	Singing/Violist	Singing	N/A		N/A	---
8	Lê Anh Tài; HCMC, 21	Bollywood dance	Dancing	N/A	N/A	N/A	---
8	Thanh Vân; HCMC	Singing	Singing			N/A	---
8	Nguyễn Hoàng Nhật; Trần Lina; HCMC	Dancing	Dancing	N/A	N/A		---
8	Vũ Đình Tri Giao; 9	Singing	Singing				---
9	Baby Action (group); HCMC	Streetdancer	Dancing				---
9	Trần Văn An; Long An, 38	Cải lương/Martial-artist	Performing	N/A	N/A	N/A	---
9	Nguyễn Ngọc Sơn; HCMC, 27	Opening bottle by teeth	Performing				---
9	Nguyễn Hữu Tiến; HCMC, 16	Singing	Singing				---
9	Vũ Thị Kim Thu; HCMC, 25	Singing	Singing	N/A	N/A	N/A	---
9	Nguyễn Ngọc Gia Bảo; HCMC, 23	Singing	Singing				---
9	The Time (group); HCMC	Light visualists	Performing				---
9	Nguyễn Thái Hoàng; HCMC, 16	Singing	Singing	N/A	N/A	N/A	---
9	ADAM (group); HCMC	Singing	Singing	N/A	N/A	N/A	---
9	Nguyễn Thị Phương Anh; Hanoi, 15	Singing	Singing	N/A	N/A	N/A	---

=== Judges' culling ===
140 acts advanced through the preliminary rounds to be culled by the judges, who chose 49 acts for advancement to the semi-final rounds. As announced, 3 additional acts were chosen as backups in the case of any semi-final qualifiers being disqualified or otherwise rendered unable to perform in the semi-finals.

=== Semi-final rounds ===
Key	Judges' choice	Finished in first place; Automatically advanced to the finals.	Finished in second place; Won the judges' vote to the finals.	Finished in third place; Lost the judges' vote.

The acts are listed of chronological appearance.

==== 1st Semi-final (March 4–6) ====
- Celebrity performer: Thu Minh ("Đường cong")

Order	Artist	Act	Buzzes and judges' choices			Finished
Order	Artist	Act	Thành Lộc	Thúy Hạnh	Huy Tuấn	Finished
1	Ngẫu hứng	Dancing				6th
2	Trần My Anh	Singing				4th
3	Dòng thời gian	Opera	---			2nd
4	Ảo giác	Contact juggling				7th
5	Nguyễn Thanh Bình	Singing				5th
6	Khát vọng	Dancing/Magic		---	---	3rd
7	Võ Trọng Phúc	Singing				1st

Judges' vote (between Dòng thời gian & Khát vọng):

- Thúy Hạnh: Dòng thời gian – "You managed to make a big impression on us and also gave both the audience and us a lot of surprises".
- Thành Lộc: Khát vọng – Leaving the final decision up to Huy Tuấn.
- Huy Tuấn: Dòng thời gian – "Your performance was excellent."

==== 2nd Semi-final (March 11–13) ====
- Celebrity performer: Anh Khang duet with Suboi ("Quê hương Việt Nam")

Order	Artist	Act	Buzzes and judges' choices			Finished
Order	Artist	Act	Thành Lộc	Thúy Hạnh	Huy Tuấn	Finished
1	Tia Chớp (U.P)	Dancing with light				5th
2	Vũ Khánh Vân	Singing	---	---		3rd
3	Bành Đức Hoài Yên	Belly dance				4th
4	Bảo Cường (Huỳnh Huy Cường)	Magician				7th
5	Hoàng Tú Linh	Pianist/Singing				6th
6	Nguyễn Trường Giang	Popping			---\	2nd
7	Vũ Song Vũ	Singing				1st

Judges' vote (between Nguyễn Trường Giang & Vũ Khánh Vân):

- Thúy Hạnh: Nguyễn Trường Giang – "I will give you another chance to prove whether or not you can do better than in the previous round."
- Huy Tuấn: Vũ khánh Vân – "Your performance was excellent.", leaving the final decision up to Thành Lộc.
- Thành Lộc: Nguyễn Trường Giang – "Your technical popping is very solid, professional and highly entertaining."

==== 3rd Semi-final (March 18–20) ====
- Celebrity performer: PAK Band

Order	Artist	Act	Buzzes and judges' choices			Finished
Order	Artist	Act	Thành Lộc	Thúy Hạnh	Huy Tuấn	Finished
1	Làng Then Orchestra	Violists				5th
2	Nguyễn Thị Thanh Trúc	Singing				1st
3	Nguyễn Văn Thịnh	Martial art				6th
4	Nguyễn Phúc Gia Huy	Stand-up comedy				4th
5	Đinh Ngọc Hoàng	Singing				2nd
6	Gió mới/Just for 1	Dancing				7th
7	Nguyễn Thái Hoàng	Singing	---	---	---	3rd

Judge's' vote (between Đinh Ngọc Hoàng & Nguyễn Thái Hoàng)

- Thành Lộc: Đinh Ngọc Hoàng
- Thúy Hạnh: Đinh Ngọc Hoàng
- Huy Tuấn was not required to vote since a majority decision had already been reached, but nevertheless confirmed that he, too, had voted for Ngọc Hoàng

==== 4th Semi-final (March 25–27) ====
- Celebrity performer: Hà Okio

Order	Artist	Act	Buzzes and judges' choices			Finished
Order	Artist	Act	Thành Lộc	Thúy Hạnh	Huy Tuấn	Finished
1	Cao Gót/MIX crew	Dancing				7th
2	Trần Hoàng Hà	Singing				6th
3	Nguyễn Đặng Đăng Khoa	Dancing	---	---		3rd
4	Nguyễn Ngọc Gia Bảo	Singing				4th
5	Vũ Phạm Ngọc Tân	Illusionist				5th
6	Dương Mạnh Hoà	Popping			---	2nd
7	Nguyễn Phương Anh	Singing				1st

Judges' vote (between Nguyễn Đặng Đăng Khoa & Dương Mạnh Hòa)

- Huy Tuấn: Nguyễn Đặng Đăng Khoa – "You do not merely imitate Michael's choreography, but use to tell your own stories."
- Thúy Hạnh: Dương Mạnh Hòa – She could not make up her mind and therefore choose Dương Mạnh Hòa in order to leave the final decision up to Thành Lộc
- Thành Lộc: Dương Mạnh Hòa – "You are a gifted director and you are great performing artist."

==== 5th Semi-final (April 1–3) ====
- Celebrity performer: 365 daband

Order	Artist	Act	Buzzes and judges' choices			Finished
Order	Artist	Act	Thành Lộc	Thúy Hạnh	Huy Tuấn	Finished
1	Đăng Quân & Bảo Ngọc	Dancing				1st
2	Đinh Thiện Nhân	Opera				5th
3	Phạm Hải Đăng	Beatbox				7th
4	Nghị lực/Energy	Breakdance	---		---	3rd
5	Mộc/iVoice	A cappella		---		2nd
6	Song Linh	Dancing				6th
7	Nguyễn Lê Nguyên	Singing				4th

Judge's vote (between Nghị lực & Mộc)

- Thúy Hạnh: Nghị lực
- Thành Lộc: Mộc
- Huy Tuấn: Mộc

==== 6th Semi-final (April 8–10) ====
- Celebrity performer: Hiền Thục

Order	Artist	Act	Buzzes and judges' choices			Finished
Order	Artist	Act	Thành Lộc	Thúy Hạnh	Huy Tuấn	Finished
1	Nguyễn Hoàng Anh	Dancing/Singing				5th
2	Y'Kroc	Singing				6th
3	Gia đình bong bóng/Bubbles Family	Parkour				1st
4	Trần Văn Thương	Singing	---	---	---	3rd
5	Song Song (twins Song Thư & Song Thảo)	Singing				7th
6	Nguyễn Hoàng Nhật & Trần Lina	Dancing				4th
7	Vũ Đình Tri Giao	Singing				2nd

Judges' vote (between & )

==== 7th Semi-final (April 15–17) ====
- Celebrity performer: Thanh Bui

Order	Artist	Act	Buzzes and judges' choices			Finished
Order	Artist	Act	Thành Lộc	Thúy Hạnh	Huy Tuấn	Finished
1	Baby action	Street dancing				5th
2	Nguyễn Hương Thảo	Musical theatre		---		2nd
3	Kiều Văn Thanh	Instrumentalist				1st
4	Ngô Minh Tú	Trial bike				6th
5	Nguyễn Xuân Trung	Singing				4th
6	Trần Thái Sơn	Beatboxing	---		---	3rd
7	Nguyễn Xuân Lân	Singing				7th

Judges' vote (between Nguyễn Hương Thảo & Trần Thái Sơn)

- Thành Lộc: Hương Thảo
- Thúy Hạnh: Thái Sơn
- Huy Tuấn: Hương Thảo

=== Final rounds ===
The Final rounds consisted of 14 acts from the semi-final rounds spread out over two shows aired on April 22 and 29, 2012.

==== Final round 1 (April 22) ====
The 1st final round was aired on April 22, 2012, filmed in BHD Studio in district 9 of Ho Chi Minh City.

Order	Artist	Act	Buzzes and judges' choices			Finished
Order	Artist	Act	Thành Lộc	Thúy Hạnh	Huy Tuấn	Finished
1	Dòng thời gian	Opera				
2	Đăng Quân & Bảo Ngọc	Dancing				1st
3	Đinh Ngọc Hoàng	Singing				
4	Nguyễn Trường Giang	Popping				
5	Nguyễn Thị Thanh Trúc	Singing				
6	Kiều Văn Thanh	Instrumentalist	---	---	---	3rd
7	Vũ Song Vũ	Singing				2nd

==== Final round 2 (April 29) ====
The 1st final round was aired on April 29, 2012, filmed in BHD Studio in district 9 of Ho Chi Minh City.

Order	Artist	Act	Buzzes and judges' choices			Finished
Order	Artist	Act	Thành Lộc	Thúy Hạnh	Huy Tuấn	Finished
1	Mộc (iVoice)	Acappella				
2	Dương Mạnh Hòa	Popping				
3	Vũ Đình Tri Giao	Singing				
4	Nguyễn Hương Thảo	Musical theatre		---		2nd
5	Gia đình bong bóng/Bubbles Family	Parkour				
6	Võ Trọng Phúc	Singing				1st
7	Nguyễn Phương Anh	Singing	---		---	3rd

=== Grand Finale ===
The Grand Finale consisted of the top 4 performance from the final rounds and was aired live on May 6, 2012 from Lan Anh stadium.

Key	Winner	Runner-up

Order	Finished	Percentage of votes	Artist	Act
1	Runner-up		Nguyễn Hương Thảo	Musical theatre
2	Third place		Vũ Song Vũ	Singing
3	Winner		Đăng Quân & Bảo Ngọc	Dancing
4	Third place		Võ Trọng Phúc	Singing
