= Vietnam's Got Talent =

Television series

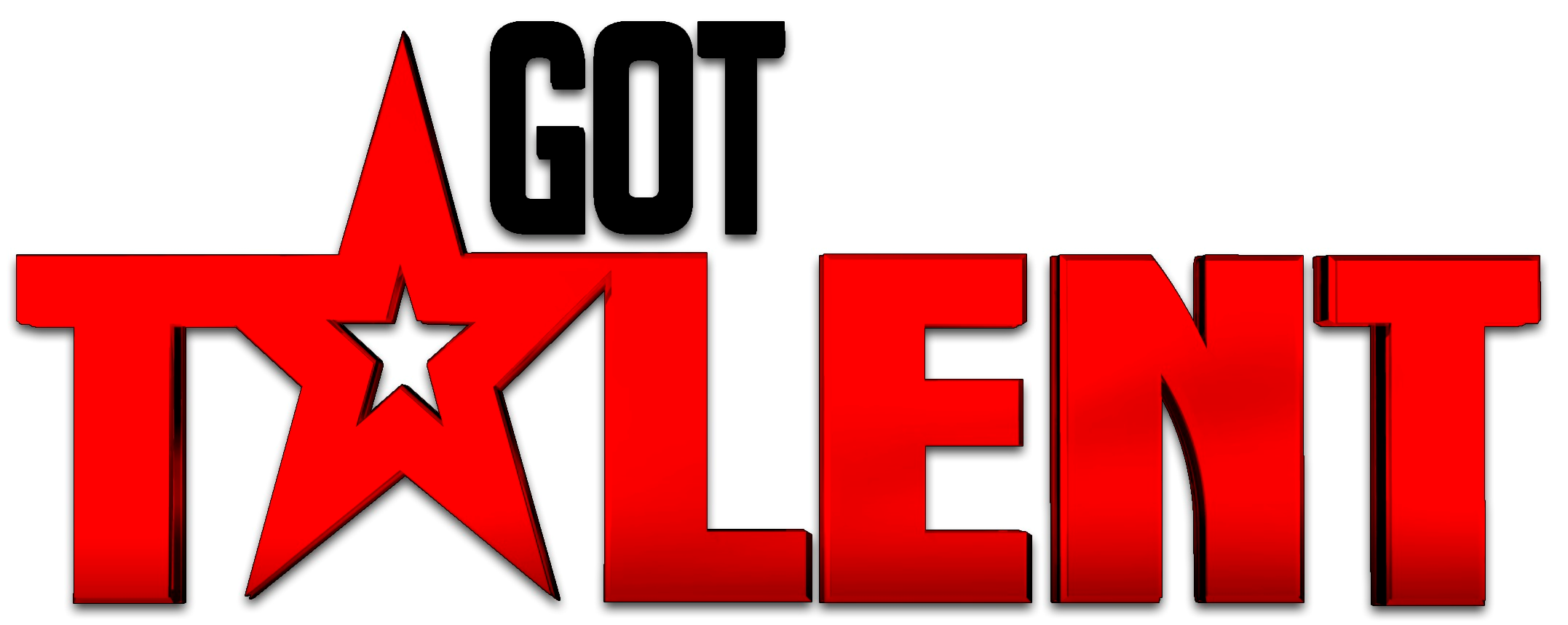
- Genre: Reality talent show
- Created by: Simon Cowell; Ken Warwick; Cécile Frot-Coutaz; Jason Raff
- Presented by: Thanh Vân (2014-2015); Thanh Bach (2012–2013); Chi Bảo (2011–12); Quyền Linh (2011–12)
- Judges: Thành Lộc; Hoài Linh; Thúy Hạnh; Huy Tuấn
- Country of origin: Vietnam
- Original language: Vietnamese
- No. of seasons: 3
- No. of episodes: 26

Production
- Producer: VTV
- Running time: 60 minutes (including commercials)
- Production companies: BHD Corp. FremantleMedia

Original release
- Network: VTV; MTV Vietnam
- Release: December 18, 2011 – 2016

Related
- Britain's Got Talent; America's Got Talent

Tìm kiếm tài năng – Vietnam's Got Talent is a Vietnamese reality television talent show that features singers, dancers, magicians, comedians, martial-art players, performers with risky weapons/tools/elements, variety acts and other performers of all ages competing for a grand prize of 400,000,000 VND (approximately $20,000). The show was based on the Got Talent series format that originated by Simon Cowell in the United Kingdom. Its first season aired Sunday nights at 9:00PM (UTC+7) between 18 December 2011 and 6 May 2012 on VTV3 and MTV Vietnam.

The show is primarily produced by Vietnam Television and BHD Corp.

== Seasons overview ==
Actor and comedian Thành Lộc was the first judge to be announced. Shortly thereafter, model and businesswoman Thúy Hạnh confirmed her role at the judges' table. Musician Huy Tuấn was given the third spot of the judges' table, while the fourth slot was filled by a new celebrity guest each week. The show was presented by actors Chi Bảo and Quyền Linh.

The first season ran for 26 episodes. The producers chose the top 360 auditioning acts for taped auditions. These were subsequently cut down to 140 by an additional round of auditions consisting of the traditional "Yes" and "No" vote by a panel of three judges. The judges then chose their favourite 49 acts for advancement into the live semi-final rounds, from which the top two acts of each semi-final advanced to two final rounds consisting of 7 acts each, from which 2 acts per final round, one by televote and one by judges' vote, advanced to a grand finale.

Series	Premiere	Finale	Winner	Runner-up	Other finalist	Presenter	Judges			
1	December 18, 2011	May 6, 2012	Nguyễn Đăng Quân & Trần Bảo Ngọc (11-and-6-year-old sport dancers)	Nguyễn Hương Thảo (22-year-old musical singer)	Võ Trọng Phúc (26-year-old country singer)	Chi Bảo & Quyền Linh	Thành Lộc	Thúy Hạnh	—N/a	Huy Tuấn
2	December 2, 2012	April 21, 2013	Trần Hữu Kiên (26-year-old opera singer)	Hoa Mẫu Đơn (Circus group act)	Cao Hà Đức Anh (11-year-old singer)	Thanh Bạch	Thành Lộc	Thúy Hạnh	—N/a	Huy Tuấn
2	December 2, 2012	April 21, 2013	Trần Hữu Kiên (26-year-old opera singer)	Hoa Mẫu Đơn (Circus group act)	Nguyễn Kiều Anh (20-year-old singer)	Thanh Bạch	Thành Lộc	Thúy Hạnh	—N/a	Huy Tuấn
3	September 28, 2014	April 5, 2015	Nguyễn Đức Vĩnh (8-year-old Hát tuồng)	Ngô Phương Bích Ngọc (Singer)	Gia Linh & Gia Bảo (Children dance duo)	Thanh Vân Hugo	Thành Lộc	Thúy Hạnh	Hoài Linh	Huy Tuấn
3	September 28, 2014	April 5, 2015	Nguyễn Đức Vĩnh (8-year-old Hát tuồng)	Ngô Phương Bích Ngọc (Singer)	Chuồn Chuồn Giấy Group (Acting and musical group)	Thanh Vân Hugo	Thành Lộc	Thúy Hạnh	Hoài Linh	Huy Tuấn
4	January 1, 2016	May 13, 2016	Nguyễn Trọng Nhân (9-year-old Drummer)	Đỗ Trung Lương (Dan Quarter)	218 Group (Led-Jumping Group)	Diệp Lâm Anh	Việt Hương	Trấn Thành	—N/a	Huy Tuấn
4	January 1, 2016	May 13, 2016	Nguyễn Trọng Nhân (9-year-old Drummer)	Đỗ Trung Lương (Dan Quarter)	Quỳnh Anh (Singer)	Diệp Lâm Anh	Việt Hương	Trấn Thành	—N/a	Huy Tuấn

=== Season 1 (2011-12) ===
The first season of Vietnam's Got Talent premiered on 18 December 2011 and ended on 6 May 2012. It was broadcast on VTV3 and MTV Vietnam. The winner of the first season was the dancing couple Đăng Quân (12 years old) and Bảo Ngọc (7 years old), with musical theater singer Nguyễn Hương Thảo making first runner-up.

=== Season 2 (2012-13) ===
The second season of Vietnam's Got Talent started from 2 December 2012 with higher prize than the season 1 (~$24,000). In this season, the presenters in season 1 (Quyen Linh & Chi Bao) were replaced by Thanh Bach (the most popular MC in Vietnam nowadays).

=== Season 3 (2014-15) ===
The third season of Vietnam's Got Talent started from 28 September 2014 with one more judge Artist Hoài Linh and the new host Thanh Vân or Vân Hugo.

=== Season 4 (2016) ===
The fourth season started on 1 January 2016 and finished on 13 May 2016.
