= Comedytime Saturday =

TV programming block on CBS

- Network: CBS
- Launched: September 24, 2011
- Closed: September 20, 2014
- Country of origin: United States
- Format: Sitcom
- Running time: Saturdays 8:00–9:00pm (2011–2012, 2013–2014)

Comedytime Saturday is the official branding for a one-hour programming block which has aired off and on since 2011–12 television season on CBS between 8 and 9 p.m. ET/PT on Saturday nights. The branding is only listed by industry sources as a placeholder for the time slot, rather than an official on-air branding. The placeholder timeslot was also the lead-in to CBS' Crimetime Saturday lineup, which was reduced by an hour to accommodate the change. Originally conceived as a vehicle for at least one first-run sitcom (thus reviving the practice of programming entertainment programs on Saturday nights for the first time in several years), the block instead became an hour for airing two in-season or previous season reruns of CBS sitcoms from the network's Monday and Thursday night lineups.

The first half-hour of the block was originally to comprise first-run episodes of Rules of Engagement, which would have moved from the Thursday time slot it held at the end of the 2010–11 television season, mainly to allow that program to build up enough episodes for syndication (by doing so, Engagement was to have become the first scripted first-run series to air on a broadcast network on Saturday night, excluding already-canceled series, since 2005). However, Engagement's Saturday run was held back as the premiere of the new sitcom How to Be a Gentleman, which took the place of Engagement in its Thursday timeslot, struggled, and after two weeks, the network announced that Engagement would premiere and remain in that Thursday timeslot on October 20, 2011, with new episodes of Gentleman moving to the second half-hour of the Saturday block, effectively being burned off on Saturday nights without CBS actually classifying it as a canceled program (the network traditionally does not announce any official program cancellations until the May upfronts, in contrast to other American networks). After one airing in the Comedytime Saturday block where a new episode of Gentlemen dropped half the audience of the Two and a Half Men rerun leading into it, How to Be a Gentleman was canceled with six completed episodes left unaired. Those episodes eventually aired in the same timeslot in double-run form at the end of May 2012 in a further out-of-season burn-off maneuver.

With no original programming, Comedytime Saturday consisted solely of reruns of CBS's Monday and Thursday night sitcoms (How I Met Your Mother, 2 Broke Girls, Two and a Half Men, Mike & Molly, The Big Bang Theory, or Rules of Engagement). The time slot was also used for special programming in holiday periods along with a Republican presidential debate which aired in mid-November.

The block was not used during 2012–2013 television season, as the network restored the first hour of Crimetime Saturday to the schedule during its upfront presentation on May 16, 2012. During part of the season, the first hour of Saturday prime time programming was used to burn off remaining episodes of the cancelled Made in Jersey. CBS added the block back to its schedule for the 2013–2014 television season, as they announced on May 15, 2013. The addition of the block came alongside expanded Thursday comedy offerings on the network. It was again removed for the 2014–15 season as CBS's comedy schedule was reduced.
