= Vietnam's Got Talent season 2 =

Vietnam's Got Talent
- Season 2
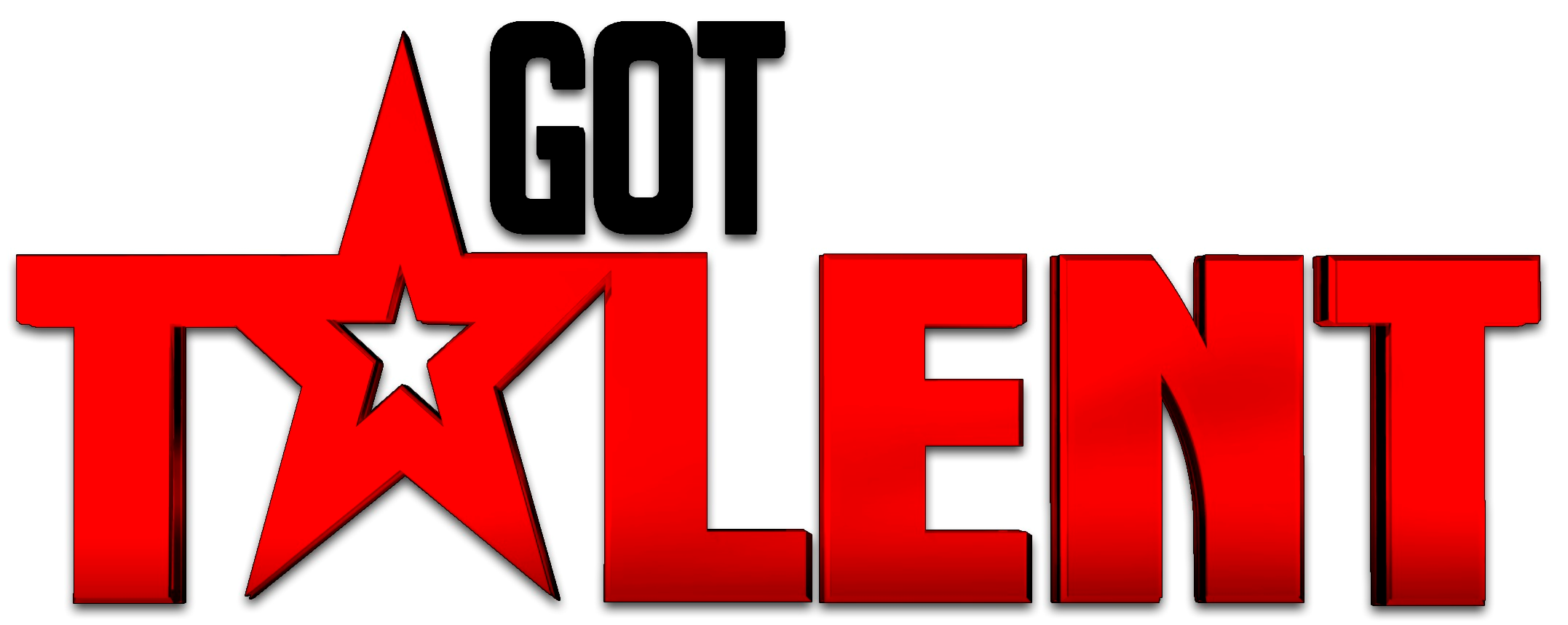
- Hosted by: Thanh Bạch
- Judges: Nguyễn Thành Lộc; Bùi Thúy Hạnh; Huy Tuấn
- Winner: Trần Hữu Kiên
- Runner-up: Hoa Mẫu Đơn

Release
- Original network: VTV; MTV Vietnam
- Original release: 2 December 2012 – 21 April 2013

Season chronology
- ← Previous; Season 1 Next → Season 3

The second season of Vietnam's Got Talent, a Vietnamese reality television talent show, was aired Sunday nights in the prime time slot of 8:00PM (UTC+7) starting from December 2, 2012 on VTV3 and MTV Vietnam. The show is based on the Got Talent series format, which was originated by Simon Cowell in the United Kingdom.

All three judges from the first season, Thành Lộc, Thúy Hạnh and Huy Tuấn, returned. Thanh Bạch replaced Quyền Linh and Chi Bảo as presenter.

The show was primarily produced by Vietnam Television and BHD Corp, with additional broadcasting by MTV Vietnam. The performance shows were aired Sundays on VTV3.

== Auditions ==
Auditions were initially held in 9 major cities.

Region	Date		Venue	Date	Venue
Region	Open audition	Call-back	Venue	Golden chance	Venue
Hanoi	September 23–25, 2012	TBA	TBA	TBA	TBA
Haiphong	September 28, 2012	N/A	TBA	N/A	N/A
Nghệ An	September 28, 2012	N/A	TBA	N/A	N/A
Da Nang	Oct. 01, 2012	N/A	TBA	N/A	N/A
Buon Me Thuot	Oct. 03, 2012	N/A	TBA	N/A	N/A
Nha Trang	Oct. 06, 2012	N/A	TBA	N/A	N/A
Cần Thơ	Oct. 10, 2012	N/A	TBA	N/A	N/A
Kiên Giang	Oct. 10, 2012	N/A	TBA	N/A	N/A
Ho Chi Minh City	Oct. 14-16, 2012	TBA	TBA	TBA	TBA

== Process ==
=== Semi-final rounds ===
Key	Judges' choice	Buzzed out	Finished in first place; Automatically advanced to the finals.	Finished in second place; Won the judges' vote to the finals.	Finished in third place; Lost the judges' vote.

The acts are listed of chronological appearance.

==== 1st Semi-final (February 03–05) ====
- Celebrity performer: Thu Minh ("Yêu Mình Anh")

Order	Artist	Act	Buzzes and judges' choices			Finished
Order	Artist	Act	Thành Lộc	Thúy Hạnh	Huy Tuấn	Finished
1	Phạm Khiếu Kim Hương	Belly dance				4th
2	Huy Hùng – Nhật Duy	Dancing				6th
3	Lê Hoàng Ngọc Ánh	Singing				5th
4	Oxy	Dancing		---	---	3rd
5	Hoàng Duy Dũng	Monochord				7th
6	Nguyễn Công Đạt	Dancing	---			2nd
7	Hoàng Khánh Linh	Singing				1st

Judges' vote (between Nguyễn Công Đạt & Oxy)

- Thành Lộc: Oxy
- Thúy Hạnh: Nguyễn Công Đạt
- Huy Tuấn: Nguyễn Công Đạt

==== 2nd Semi-final (February 24–26) ====
- Celebrity performer: Anh Khoa, Nam Hương, Rapper Wowy ("Tôi tìm thấy tôi")

Order	Artist	Act	Buzzes and judges' choices			Finished
Order	Artist	Act	Thành Lộc	Thúy Hạnh	Huy Tuấn	Finished
1	Mosquito	Solo				5th
2	Lưu Thị Thiên Phương	Belly dance				7th
3	Nguyễn Tấn Vũ	Harmonica				6th
4	Free Style	Breakdance	---	---	---	3rd
5	Nguyễn Phương	Magician				1st
6	Kran Jan	Solo				2nd
7	Nguyễn Văn Hoàng	Circus				4th

Judges' vote (between Kran Jan & Free Style)

- Thành Lộc: Kran Jan
- Huy Tuấn: Kran Jan
- Thúy Hạnh: Kran Jan

==== 3rd Semi-final (March 03–05) ====
- Celebrity performer: 365 Band ("Ai đó đêm nay")

Order	Artist	Act	Buzzes and judges' choices			Finished
Order	Artist	Act	Thành Lộc	Thúy Hạnh	Huy Tuấn	Finished
1	S.I.N.E. (Say is not enough)	Double				4th
2	Cao Ngọc Thùy Anh	Solo				6th
3	Trần Trọng Tân	Solo	---	---		3rd
4	Phạm Hồng Minh	Painting				1st
5	Hệ Mặt Trời (Solar System)	Breakdance				5th
6	Trần Thị Xuân	Solo				7th
7	Thanh Phong Martial Art	Circus			---	2nd

Judges' vote (between Thanh Phong Martial Art & Trần Trọng Tân)

- Thúy Hạnh: Võ Đường Thanh Phong
- Thành Lộc: Võ Đường Thanh Phong
- Huy Tuấn: Võ Đường Thanh Phong look like

==== 4th Semi Final (March 10–12) ====
- Celebrity performer: Mỹ Linh ("Mãi bên con")

Order	Artist	Act	Buzzes and judges' choices			Finished
Order	Artist	Act	Thành Lộc	Thúy Hạnh	Huy Tuấn	Finished
1	Nguyễn Thu Trang	Singing				5th
2	Big Toe	Dancing				4th
3	Tô Mạnh Linh	Singing	---		---	3rd
4	Nguyễn Trung Đức	BMX				6th
5	Dương Quyết Thắng	Singing				1st
6	Thảo Trang & Mari	Belly dance				7th
7	Lý Bằng	Circus		---		2nd

Judges' vote (between Tô Mạnh Linh & Lý Bằng)

- Huy Tuấn: Lý Bằng
- Thúy Hạnh: Tô Mạnh Linh
- Thành Lộc: Lý Bằng

==== 5th Semi Final (March 17–19) ====
- Celebrity performer: Hồng Nhung ("And Đừng Đi")

Order	Artist	Act	Buzzes and judges' choices			Finished
Order	Artist	Act	Thành Lộc	Thúy Hạnh	Huy Tuấn	Finished
1	Phạm Anh Tú	Music with Hands				7th
2	Trần Hữu Kiên	Opera				1st
3	Nguyễn Trang Linh	Jump rope dance				6th
4	Nguyễn Hải Lam	Football	---		---	3rd
5	HFO	Breakdance		---		2nd
6	Tường Vi Vân	Solo				4th
7	VNFSK	Roller-blading				5th

Judges' vote (between HFO & Nguyễn Hải Lam)

- Thành Lộc: HFO
- Thúy Hạnh: Nguyễn Hải Lam
- Huy Tuấn: I like red, but i choose black (HFO)

Remark: Tường Vi Vân pressed the buzzer by herself suddenly during the show.

==== 6th Semi-final (March 24–26) ====
- Celebrity performer: Hiền Thục ("Chuyện hẹn hò")

Order	Artist	Act	Buzzes and judges' choices			Finished
Order	Artist	Act	Thành Lộc	Thúy Hạnh	Huy Tuấn	Finished
1	Lương Hồng Khánh An	Singing	---	---	---	3rd
2	Milky Way (Khắc Linh – Tuấn Linh)	Dancing				4th
3	Cao Hà Đức Anh	Singing				2nd
4	V-Hunter	Dancing				6th
5	Đinh Thùy Dương	Dancing				5th
6	Nguyễn Mai Nguyên Huy	Magician				7th
7	Nguyễn Kiều Anh	Singing				1st

Judges' vote (between Cao Hà Đức Anh & Lương Hồng Khánh An)

- Thành Lộc: Cao Hà Đức Anh
- Thúy Hạnh: Cao Hà Đức Anh
- Huy Tuấn: Cao Hà Đức Anh

==== 7th Semi-final (March 31-April 02) ====
- Celebrity performer: MTV Band

Order	Artist	Act	Buzzes and judges' choices			Finished
Order	Artist	Act	Thành Lộc	Thúy Hạnh	Huy Tuấn	Finished
1	Văn Hà My	Singing				7th
2	Đoàn Minh Hoàn	Dance art				4th
3	Huỳnh Văn Sáu	Blowing Money	---	---	---	3rd
4	Opera House	Dancing				6th
5	Trần Thế Thể Thiên	Singing				5th
6	Nguyễn Thị Huyền Trang	Blowing flute				2nd
7	Hoa Mẫu Đơn	Circus				1st

Judges' vote (between Huỳnh Văn Sáu & Nguyễn Thị Huyền Trang)

- Thành Lộc: Nguyễn Thị Huyền Trang
- Thúy Hạnh: Nguyễn Thị Huyền Trang
- Huy Tuấn: Nguyễn Thị Huyền Trang

=== Final rounds ===
The Final rounds consisted of 14 acts from the semi-final rounds spread out over two shows aired on 7 and 14 April 2013

==== Final round 1 (April 07) ====
The 1st final round was aired on April 7, 2013, filmed in BHD Studio in district 9 of Ho Chi Minh City.

Order	Artist	Act	Buzzes and judges' choices			Finished
Order	Artist	Act	Thành Lộc	Thúy Hạnh	Huy Tuấn	Finished
1	Hoàng Khánh Linh	Singing				5th
2	Nguyễn Phương	Magician				Wild Card
3	K'Duynhs	Singing				6th
4	HFO	Dancing				4th
5	Dương Quyết Thắng	Singing				Wild Card
6	Trần Hữu Kiên	Singing				1st
7	Thanh Phong Martial Art	Circus				7th

==== Final round 2 (April 14) ====
The 2nd final round was aired on April 14, 2013, filmed in BHD Studio in district 9 of Ho Chi Minh City.

Order	Artist	Act	Buzzes and judges' choices			Finished
Order	Artist	Act	Thành Lộc	Thúy Hạnh	Huy Tuấn	Finished
1	Nguyễn Thị Huyền Trang	Blowing flute				4th
2	Cao Hà Đức Anh	Singing				Wild Card
3	Nguyễn Công Đạt	Dancing				7th
4	Nguyễn Kiều Anh	Singing				Wild Card
5	Phạm Hồng Minh	Painting				5th
6	Hoa Mẫu Đơn	Circus				1st
7	Lý Bằng	Circus				6th

==== Wild Card ====
Artist	Act	Finished
Cao Hà Đức Anh	Singing	Thúy Hạnh call
Dương Quyết Thắng	Singing	Did not call
Nguyễn Kiều Anh	Singing	Thành Lộc call
Nguyễn Phương	Magician	Did not call

=== Grand Finale ===
The Grand Finale consisted of the top 4 performance from the final rounds and was aired live on 21 April 2013 from Lan Anh stadium.

Key	Winner	Runner-up

Order	Finished	Percentage of votes	Artist	Act
1	Third place		Cao Hà Đức Anh	Singing
2	Third place		Nguyễn Kiều Anh	Singing
3	Winner	33%	Trần Hữu Kiên	Singing
4	Runner-up	32%	Hoa Mẫu Đơn	Circus
