= Vietnam's Got Talent season 3 =

Vietnam's Got Talent
- Season 3
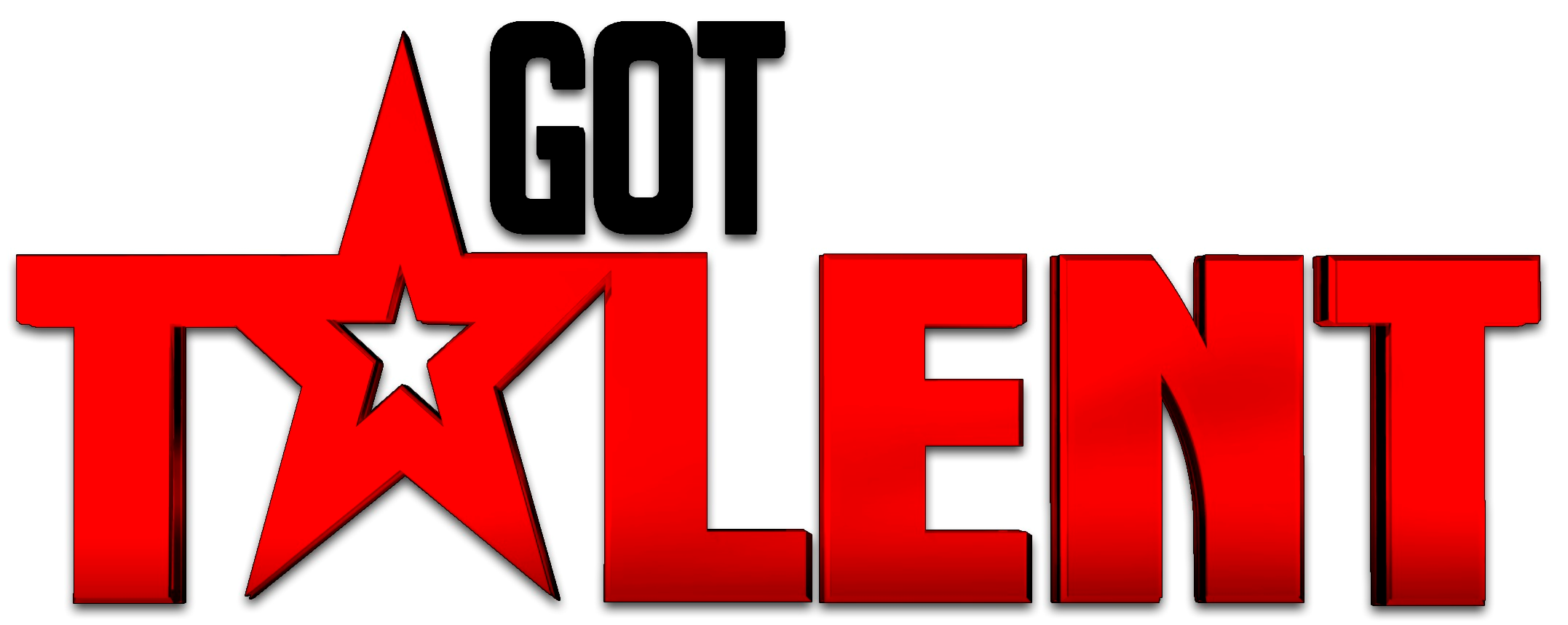
- Hosted by: Thanh Vân Hugo
- Judges: Thành Lộc; Thúy Hạnh; Hoài Linh; Huy Tuấn
- Winner: Nguyễn Đức Vĩnh
- Runner-up: Ngô Phương Bích Ngọc

Release
- Original network: VTV; MTV Vietnam
- Original release: September 28, 2014 – April 5, 2015

Season chronology
- ← Previous; Season 2 Next → Season 4

The third season of Vietnam's Got Talent, a Vietnamese reality television talent show, was aired Sunday nights in the prime time slot of 8:00PM (UTC+7) starting from September 8, 2014 on VTV3 and MTV Vietnam. The show is based on the Got Talent series format, which was originated by Simon Cowell in the United Kingdom.

4 judges are Thành Lộc, Thúy Hạnh, Huy Tuấn and Hoai Linh. Thanh Van Hugo replaced Thanh Bach as presenter.

The show was primarily produced by Vietnam Television and BHD Corp, with additional broadcasting by MTV Vietnam. The performance shows were aired Sundays on VTV3.

== Golden buzzer ==
The judges' auditions also feature the Golden Buzzer. Each judge would have one chance to use the Golden Buzzer. The so-called Golden Acts, those on whom the Golden Buzzer is used, would automatically advance to the Semi-Finals. Hoai Linh was the first to press the Golden Buzzer on Bùi Văn Tự, followed by Thanh Loc on Nhóm 4 chị em and Huy Tuan on Dương Thị Huỳnh Mai.

Judges	Artist	Act	Place Audition
Hoài Linh	Bùi Văn Tự	Printing	Hanoi
Thanh Loc	Nhóm 4 chị em	Singing	Ho Chi Minh City
Huy Tuấn	Dương Thị Huỳnh Mai	Singing	Ho Chi Minh City

== Semi-final rounds ==
Key	Judges' choice	Buzzed out	Finished in first place; Automatically advanced to the finals.	Finished in second place; Won the judges' vote to the finals.	Finished in third place; Lost the judges' vote.

The acts are listed of chronological appearance.

=== 1st Semi-final ===
- Celebrity performer: Paul Cosentino, Âu Bảo Ngân, Minh Thùy

Order	Artist	Act	Buzzes and judges' choices				Finished
Order	Artist	Act	Thành Lộc	Thúy Hạnh	Hoài Linh	Huy Tuấn	Finished
1	BIA	Singing					Eliminated
2	Trần Cao Luận	Magician					Eliminated
3	Lâm Thành Đạt	Singing					Eliminated
4	Dương Thị Huỳnh Mai	Singing	---	---	---	---	3rd
5	Cao Hiếu & Minh Phượng	Bellydance					Eliminated
6	Bar-TN	Street Dance					2nd
7	Nguyễn Đức Vĩnh	Hat Chau Van					1st

=== 2nd Semi-final ===
- Celebrity performer: Quốc Thiên, Uyên Linh, Trung Dân

Order	Artist	Act	Buzzes and judges' choices				Finished
Order	Artist	Act	Thành Lộc	Thúy Hạnh	Hoài Linh	Huy Tuấn	Finished
1	Đam mê không tuổi	Dancing					Eliminated
2	Hồ Văn Thai	Singing					Eliminated
3	Trần Minh Thư	Singing					Eliminated
4	Trịnh Huyền	Singing	---		---		3rd
5	Đan Trang	Singing					Eliminated
6	Nguyễn Huỳnh Nhu	Comedy - Magician		---		---	2nd
7	Bảo Cường	Extreme performance artist					1st (But withdrew)

=== 3rd Semi-final ===
Order	Artist	Act	Buzzes and judges' choices				Finished
Order	Artist	Act	Thành Lộc	Thúy Hạnh	Hoài Linh	Huy Tuấn	Finished
1	Toxic	Singing					Eliminated
2	Phan Hông Nhựt	Magician					Eliminated
3	Nguyễn Vũ Hải	Dancing					Eliminated
4	Lý Vĩnh Hòa	Singing	---		---		3rd
5	Nguyễn Việt Duy	Magician					Eliminated
6	Mai Quốc Anh	Dancing		---		---	2nd
7	Từ Như Tài	Singing					1st

=== 4th Semi-final ===
- Celebrity performer: Hồng Nhung, Mạnh Tuấn, An Trần

Order	Artist	Act	Buzzes and judges' choices				Finished
Order	Artist	Act	Thành Lộc	Thúy Hạnh	Hoài Linh	Huy Tuấn	Finished
1	David C. Muray	Singing					Eliminated
2	Trần Tấn Phát	Magician					Eliminated
3	Ảo Ảnh	Dancing					Eliminated
4	Thanh Nhàn	Singing	---	---			3rd
5	Nguyễn Minh Cường	Waacking					Eliminated
6	Chiến Binh Đường Phố	Street Sport			---	---	2nd
7	Thục Nhi & Đức Huy	Dancing					1st

=== 5th Semi-final ===
- Celebrity performer: Thu Minh

Order	Artist	Act	Buzzes and judges' choices				Finished
Order	Artist	Act	Thành Lộc	Thúy Hạnh	Hoài Linh	Huy Tuấn	Finished
1	Nguyễn Bùi Nam Khuê	Dancing					Eliminated
2	Mari	Belly dance					Eliminated
3	Phan Quốc Bảo	Singing					Eliminated
4	Dải Ngân Hà	Dancing	---	---	---	---	3rd
5	Nguyễn Văn Kỷ	Artist					Eliminated
6	4 chị em/The Sisters	Singing					2nd
7	Gia Linh & Gia Bảo	Dancing					1st

=== 6th Semi-final ===
- Celebrity performer: Noo Phước Thịnh, Trần Thái Sơn, Nhật Thủy

Order	Artist	Act	Buzzes and judges' choices				Finished
Order	Artist	Act	Thành Lộc	Thúy Hạnh	Hoài Linh	Huy Tuấn	Finished
1	Lê Xuân Tùng	Nặm tò he					Eliminated
2	Bình Định Gia Phúc Mậu	Acting					Eliminated
3	Bùi Thị Hạnh	Singing					Eliminated
4	Bùi Văn Tự	Lighting		---	---	---	3rd
5	Gia Đình Bong Bóng/Bubbles Family	Parkour					Eliminated
6	Hà Chương	Singing	---				2nd
7	Ngô Phương Bích Ngọc	Singing					1st

=== 7th Semi-final ===
Order	Artist	Act	Buzzes and judges' choices				Finished
Order	Artist	Act	Thành Lộc	Thúy Hạnh	Hoài Linh	Huy Tuấn	Finished
1	Nguyễn Thị Mận	Hát Bài Chòi					Eliminated
2	Thiều Huy Hoàng	Magician					Eliminated
3	Lâm Vissay	Singing					Eliminated
4	Chuồn Chuồn Giấy	Acting			---	---	3rd
5	Hà Văn Anh	Acting					Eliminated
6	Vũ Thái Thảo Vy	Singing	---	---			2nd
7	Đào Hiền Thục Anh	Bellydance					1st

== Final rounds ==
The Final rounds consisted of 14 acts from the semi-final rounds spread out over two shows aired on 22 and 29 March 2015.

=== Final round 1 ===
The 1st final round was aired on March 22, 2015, filmed in BHD Studio in district 9 of Ho Chi Minh City.

Order	Artist	Act	Buzzes and judges' choices				Finished
Order	Artist	Act	Thành Lộc	Thúy Hạnh	Hoài Linh	Huy Tuấn	Finished
1	4 chị em/The Sisters	Singing					Eliminated
2	Ngô Phương Bích Ngọc	Singing					Wild Card
3	Mai Quốc Anh	Dancing					Eliminated
4	Chiến Binh Đường Phố	Street Sport					Eliminated
5	Thục Nhi - Đức Huy	Dancing					Wild Card
6	Nguyễn Đức Vĩnh	Hát Chầu Văn					1st
7	Nguyễn Huỳnh Nhu	Magician					Eliminated

=== Final round 2 ===
The 2nd final round was aired on April 29, 2015, filmed in BHD Studio in district 9 of Ho Chi Minh City.

Order	Artist	Act	Buzzes and judges' choices				Finished
Order	Artist	Act	Thành Lộc	Thúy Hạnh	Hoài Linh	Huy Tuấn	Finished
1	Đào Hiền Thục Anh	Belly dance					Eliminated
2	Chuồn Chuồn Giấy	Acting					Wild Card
3	Từ Như Tài	Singing					Eliminated
4	Bar-TN	Street Sport					Eliminated
5	Hà Chương	Dancing					Wild Card
6	Gia Linh - Gia Bảo	Dancing					1st
7	Vũ Thái Thảo Vy	Singing					Eliminated

=== Wild Card ===
Artist	Act	Finished
Ngô Phương Bích Ngọc	Singing	Advanced
Thục Nhi - Đức Huy	Dancing	Did not call
Chuồn Chuồn Giấy	Acting	Advanced
Hà Chương	Singing	Did not call

== Grand Finale ==
The Grand Finale consisted of the top 4 performance from the final rounds and was aired live on 5 April 2015.

Key	Winner	Runner-up

Order	Finished	Artist	Act
1	Third place	Chuồn Chuồn Giấy	Acting
2	Third place	Gia Linh - Gia Bảo	Dancing
3	Winner	Nguyễn Đức Vĩnh	Hát Chầu Văn
4	Runner-up	Ngô Phương Bích Ngọc	Singing
