= You Deserve It =

- Genre: Game show
- Created by: Dick de Rijk
- Presented by: Chris Harrison; Brooke Burns
- Theme music composer: David Vanacore
- Country of origin: United States
- Original language: English
- No. of seasons: 1
- No. of episodes: 6

Production
- Executive producers: Chris Coelen; Dick de Rijk; Matilda Zoltowski; Emma Conway
- Producer: Kinetic Content
- Running time: approx. 44 minutes

Original release
- Network: ABC
- Release: April 3, 2011 (Pilot)
- Release: November 21 – December 26, 2011

You Deserve It is an American game show created by Dick de Rijk for American Broadcasting Company (ABC). The show is hosted by Chris Harrison and Brooke Burns. In the show, contestants earn money toward a beneficiary.

== Format ==
The contestant plays for a beneficiary, who is put on surveillance throughout the show and told of the winnings at the end.

They play five rounds which involve identifying a "Who", "What" or "Where" subject based on a series of clues. The player is given the subject's category and one free clue. An additional 9 clues are hidden on the board; clues are revealed in a predetermined order and get progressively easier. The bank for each round is divided into nine increasing values, hidden behind the numbers 1 through 9. To purchase a clue, the player chooses a numbered card. The amount is revealed and subtracted from the bank, then the clue is revealed. A player can guess the subject at any time, but they only get one guess. A correct guess adds the remaining money in the bank to the contestant's total winnings; if the guess is incorrect, no money is banked for that round and the player then continue with the next, more valuable round.

=== Gameplay Changes ===
The series' pilot aired on December 26, 2011, with a different stage set and new bank amounts for round 4 and round 5, which were $75,000 and $100,000. A new rule had also been introduced, making a wrong answer much more costly. Every incorrect guess (or lack of an answer after all 10 clues) not only disabled the level with the highest amount at that time, but also forced the player to repeat the failed level in the next round with a different question. Unlike all the previous episodes, in which the contestant chose a number for a random value in the main screen, there was a smaller screen to the right of main screen, with the numbers revolving inside.

=== Prize breakdown ===
(Episode 1-5, with a possible grand total of $435,000)

| Round # | 1 | 2 | 3 | 4 | 5 |
|---|---|---|---|---|---|
| Starting Bank Amount | $10,000 | $25,000 | $50,000 | $100,000 | $250,000 |
| Clue Value Breakdown | $100 | $100 | $500 | $1,000 | $2,500 |
| Clue Value Breakdown | $200 | $200 | $1,000 | $2,000 | $5,000 |
| Clue Value Breakdown | $300 | $300 | $1,500 | $3,000 | $7,500 |
| Clue Value Breakdown | $400 | $400 | $3,000 | $4,000 | $15,000 |
| Clue Value Breakdown | $500 | $1,500 | $5,000 | $10,000 | $25,000 |
| Clue Value Breakdown | $1,000 | $4,000 | $6,000 | $12,500 | $30,000 |
| Clue Value Breakdown | $2,000 | $5,000 | $8,000 | $17,500 | $40,000 |
| Clue Value Breakdown | $2,500 | $6,000 | $10,000 | $20,000 | $50,000 |
| Clue Value Breakdown | $3,000 | $7,500 | $15,000 | $30,000 | $75,000 |

(Episode 6, with a possible grand total of $260,000)

| Round # | 1 | 2 | 3 | 4 | 5 |
|---|---|---|---|---|---|
| Starting Bank Amount | $10,000 | $25,000 | $50,000 | $75,000 | $100,000 |
| Clue Value Breakdown | $100 | $100 | $100 | $100 | $200 |
| Clue Value Breakdown | $200 | $200 | $200 | $200 | $300 |
| Clue Value Breakdown | $300 | $300 | $300 | $300 | $500 |
| Clue Value Breakdown | $400 | $400 | $400 | $400 | $1,000 |
| Clue Value Breakdown | $500 | $500 | $1,000 | $1,000 | $8,000 |
| Clue Value Breakdown | $1,000 | $1,000 | $3,000 | $3,000 | $15,000 |
| Clue Value Breakdown | $2,000 | $5,000 | $10,000 | $15,000 | $20,000 |
| Clue Value Breakdown | $2,500 | $7,500 | $15,000 | $25,000 | $25,000 |
| Clue Value Breakdown | $3,000 | $10,000 | $20,000 | $30,000 | $30,000 |

== Critical reception ==
Brian Lowry of Variety thought that the show's rules were a "hodgepodge" and criticized Burns' co-hosting, but praised ABC for creating another "uplifting" series. Kevin McDonough of South Coast Today was less positive, saying that "The show doesn't so much celebrate generosity as reduce it to something unspeakably tacky." Tom Conroy of Media Life thought that the show's format was "novel but not involving".

Despite the show being considered a failure in its home country, it has picked up success in Vietnam and became one of the most long-running gameshows in the country, with a total of 13 seasons being produced so far. By 2026, Vietnam is the only country that still produces and airs their version of the show. Vietnam Television and TV Media has bought the rights to the show, owning the format outright.

== International versions ==
| Country | Title | Host | Network | Aired |
|---|---|---|---|---|
| Italy | You Deserve It(?) | ? | ? | April 2011 - ? |
| Germany | You Deserve It! | ? | SAT.1 | April 2011 - ? |
| Turkey | Sen Hak Ediyorsun | Yiğit Özşener | ATV | August 8, 2011 - November 14, 2011 |
| United States (Original Version) | You Deserve It | Chris Harrison | ABC | April 3, 2011 (Pilot) November 21, 2011 - December 26, 2011 |
| Arab World | تستاهل Testahel | Saud Al Dossari | MBC 1 | April 17, 2012 - June 5, 2012 |
| Arab World | أنت تستاهل Inta Testahel | George Kurdahi | MBC Masr 2 | October 25, 2014 (Recorded in 2011) - November 15, 2014 |
| Spain | Te lo mereces | Paula Vázquez | Antena 3 | May 10, 2012 - September 21, 2012 |
| China | 为你而战 Wei Ni Er Zhan | Zhang Bin | CCTV-1 | January 20, 2013 - March 22, 2014 |
| Vietnam | Vì bạn xứng đáng | Trấn Thành (June 23, 2013 – June 7, 2015) Quyền Linh (June 14, 2015 – August 27, 2022; March 3, 2024 – July 15, 2026) Nguyên Khang (October 26, 2026 – present) | VTV3 | June 23, 2013 - August 27, 2022 March 3, 2024 – present |
| South Africa | You Deserve It | Sydney Matlhaku | e.tv | September 22, 2013 - May 4, 2014 |

== Links ==
- ABC Sets Date for 'You Deserve It' Game Show
- Official Website (via Internet Archive)
