= Crimetime Saturday =

Television programming block on CBS and CTV

- Network: CBS (United States); CTV (Canada)
- Launched: September 25, 2004; 22 years ago
- Closed: September 5, 2026; 57 days ago
- Country of origin: United States; Canada
- Format: Police procedural; Drama; True crime
- Running time: United States: Saturdays 8:00–11:00pm (2004–2011, 2012, 2014–2026); Saturdays 9:00–11:00 (2011–2012, 2013–2014)

Crimetime Saturday is the official branding for a programming block that started in 2004–05 on the American CBS and Canadian CTV networks Saturday nights. However, the branding is only listed by CBS and industry sources as a placeholder for the time slot, and not as an official on-air branding for the night. The Crimetime block on CBS ceased operations permanently on September 5, 2026.

== History ==
Starting with the 2004–05 season, Crimetime Saturday began with the first two hours feature reruns of CBS's crime drama procedural series, which over the years have included the four series of the CSI franchise, Criminal Minds, NCIS, NCIS: Los Angeles, Cold Case, Flashpoint (before its move to Ion Television), The Mentalist, Blue Bloods and FBI and 48 Hours (9 p.m. hour only), with the final hour featuring a new or encore edition of the CBS News newsmagazine program 48 Hours, which focuses on true crime stories. Several times a year 48 Hours will air two-hour specials or consecutive episodes (during summer it airs 2 hour encore episodes weekly).

Beginning in the 2011–2012 season, the block was reduced to two hours from three to make room for Comedytime Saturday, a one-hour sitcom block, from 8 to 9 p.m. ET/PT. However, that hour was restored to Crimetime for the 2012–2013 season due to that block never being executed as planned and becoming a basic hour of repeat sitcoms. In a few cases, burned off shows such as Made in Jersey have aired in the first or both hours to minimize ratings damage, along with a new episode of Vegas in mid-April 2013 pushed up by a night due to CBS News coverage of the apprehension of the Boston Marathon bombing suspect.

The Crimetime block was re-reduced to two hours of Saturday night for the 2013–2014 season with the return of Comedytime Saturday, but returned for the full three hours in the 2014–2015 season after a reduction of CBS's comedy schedule.

In the 2020–21 season and again in the 2021–22 season, Crimetime Saturday was reduced to 1 hour in June and July due to the Superstar Racing Experience (only 48 Hours aired during that time frame); the only other interruptions were burn offs and Love Island during that time frame. With the Superstar Racing Experience moving to ESPN and Love Island moving to Peacock, Crimetime was extended back to 2 hours for the 2022–23 season. The Crimetime block on CBS ceased operations permanently on September 5, 2026.
