= Rock Center with Brian Williams =

- Presented by: Brian Williams
- Country of origin: United States
- Original language: English
- No. of seasons: 2
- No. of episodes: 76

Production
- Running time: 42 minutes
- Production company: NBC News

Original release
- Network: NBC
- Release: October 31, 2011 – June 21, 2013

Rock Center with Brian Williams is an American weekly television newsmagazine that was broadcast on NBC from October 31, 2011, to June 21, 2013 and hosted by former NBC Nightly News anchor Brian Williams. It aired on Mondays until January 30, 2012, and then began airing Wednesdays starting February 8, 2012. It was produced in Rockefeller Center's Studio 3B, the same space as NBC Nightly News, and formerly that of the Today Show.

Named after the location of the NBC News headquarters in the GE Building at 30 Rockefeller Center, the program was the first new NBC News program to launch in primetime on NBC since Now with Tom Brokaw and Katie Couric debuted in 1993.

Rock Center was designed to be more serious than NBC's existing prime time newsmagazine, Dateline NBC, which had increasingly delved into human interest and true crime stories, and had switched from a multiple-story format into a single story format.

On May 10, 2012, NBC announced that Rock Center had been removed from the schedule for the remainder of the May 2012 sweeps period due to low ratings. Three days later, on May 13, 2012, NBC announced that Rock Center would be renewed for a second season during its 2012–13 upfront presentation. The series was also shown on MSNBC.

On May 10, 2013, the series was canceled after two seasons. The last program aired on June 21, 2013.

== Correspondents ==
- Harry Smith
- Kate Snow
- Ted Koppel as special correspondent
- Chelsea Clinton as special correspondent
- Bob Costas – NBC Sports anchor; Host, Football Night in America
- Meredith Vieira – NBC News Special Correspondent
- Richard Engel – NBC News chief foreign correspondent
- Nancy Snyderman – NBC News chief medical editor
- Matt Lauer – Co-Anchor of Today
- Ann Curry – NBC News National & International Correspondent
- Natalie Morales – news anchor of Today

== Notable segments ==
The program received considerable attention for its November 14, 2011 broadcast, in which Bob Costas interviewed former Penn State Nittany Lions football assistant coach Jerry Sandusky. Sandusky proclaimed his innocence in light of recent child sex abuse charges against him, despite acknowledging inappropriate contact with the victims, and denied the alleged cover-up by his former employers. Sandusky would insist that he is not a pedophile. It was Sandusky's first public interview since the abrupt firing of head coach Joe Paterno the week before, whom Sandusky had served as defensive coordinator under for decades with the Nittany Lions.

The Sandusky interview, entitled Sandusky Speaks, was one of three 2011 Rock Center segments that were nominated for News & Documentary Emmy Awards in 2012; the other two were State of Shame and The Price of Gold.

== Timeslot changes ==
Rock Center changed its nightly timeslot five times since its inception, initially broadcasting on Monday evenings at 10 p.m. ET. The program enjoyed a temporary stint on Wednesday at 9 p.m., until a return to its original timeslot. The program was later moved back to 9 p.m. on Wednesday evenings, until it was removed from the schedule. With its second season renewal, the program moved to Thursday nights at 10 p.m., following NBC's revamped Thursday evening comedy lineup, but ended its run on Fridays at 10 p.m. ET.

== Reception ==
=== Ratings ===
The show premiered to a 1.0 adult 18–49 rating and 4.14 million viewers. This was less (in an 18–49 rating) than the 1.2 rating from the show it replaced, The Playboy Club. Rock Center was the third-ranked show in the timeslot behind new episodes of ABC's Castle, and CBS's Hawaii Five-0.

Season	Timeslot (ET)	# Ep.	Premiered		Ended		TV Season	Rank	Viewers (in millions)
Season	Timeslot (ET)	# Ep.	Date	Premiere Viewers (in millions)	Date	Finale Viewers (in millions)	TV Season	Rank	Viewers (in millions)
1	Monday 10:00pm Wednesday 9:00pm Thursday 10:00pm	28	October 31, 2011	4.14	June 28, 2012	3.30	2011–2012	#147	3.95
2	Thursday 10:00pm (2012); Friday 10:00pm (2013)	30	September 13, 2012	6.00	June 21, 2013	4.38	2012–2013	#117	4.16

=== Critical reception ===
Rock Center with Brian Williams received mixed and moderate reviews. Metacritic scored Rock Center with Brian Williams a 63 out of a possible 100, defining the series as generally favorable.

Linda Stasi of New York Post gave the series a 3.5/4. Stasi wrote "so smart, so unexpected, so entertaining and yet so informative that you might think you just stepped back in time 20 years". Matt Roush of TV Guide gave it a moderate review, stating "Substantive without being stuffy, workmanlike but something less than a wow. Nothing cheesy or sleazy, But nothing really electrifying happened, either.". James Poniewozik of Time also gave a moderate, general review, paying particular attention to a closing segment with Jon Stewart of The Daily Show. "Rock Center may not be a ratings smash, and not all its experiments may work. But the good news is, Williams and Stewart can both keep their day jobs.". Hank Stuever of Washington Post gave a positive review, saying "The result was assured, quick-paced and enjoyably flavored with a few spicy dashes of Brian Williams' dry rub." Alessandra Stanley of The New York Times gave it a general, neutral review. Stanley said "Rock Center is still a work in progress, so it’s hard to judge how it will fare. But it’s already clear that Mr. Williams wasn’t chosen to host it because of his stature as a news anchor. Mostly, he is there to draw viewers who think of him as a funny TV personality who sometimes moonlights delivering the news.".
