= Vietnam's Got Talent season 4 =

Vietnam's Got Talent
- Season 4
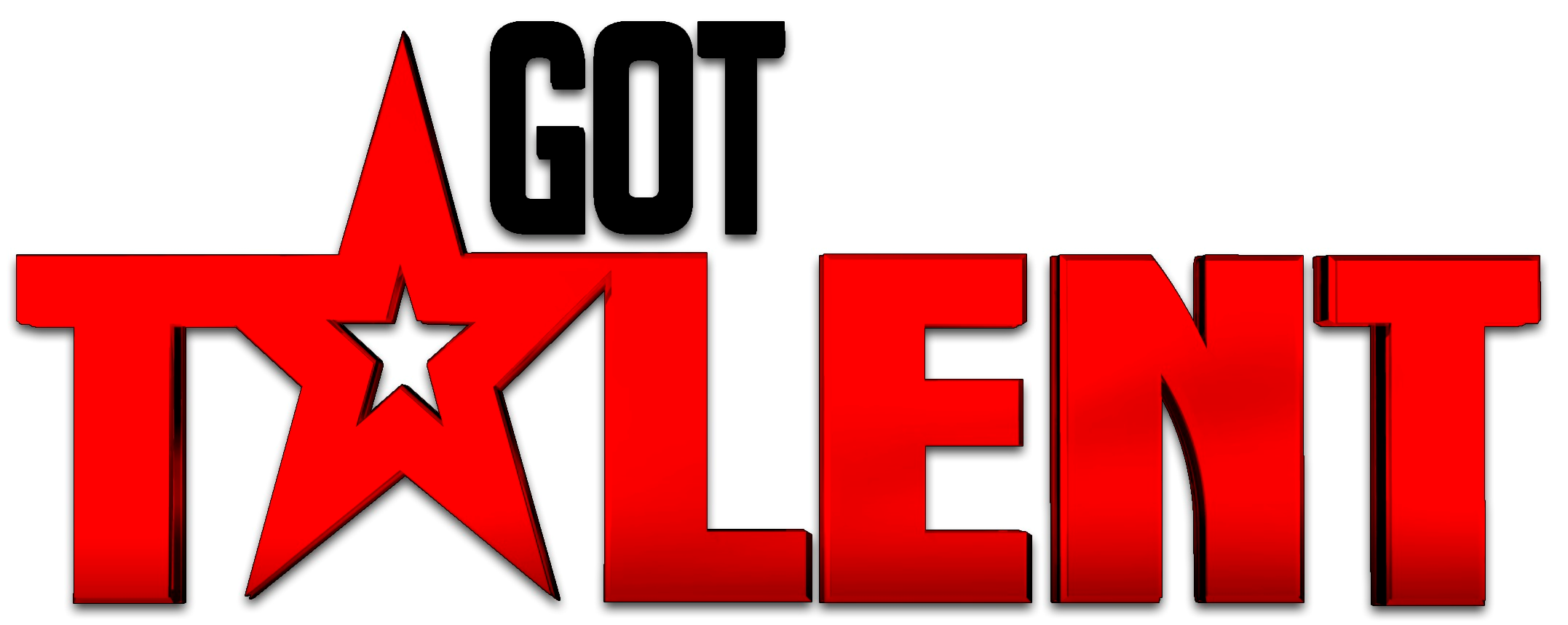
- Judges: Trấn Thành; Việt Hương; Huy Tuấn
- Winner: Nguyễn Trọng Nhân
- Runner-up: Đỗ Trung Lương

Release
- Original network: VTV; MTV Vietnam
- Original release: 2016 – 2016

Season chronology
- ← Previous; Season 3

The fourth and final season of Vietnam's Got Talent premiered on 1 January 2016 and finished on 13 May 2016.

The winner was drummer Nguyễn Trọng Nhân.

== Semifinalist summary ==
7 Acts perform each week, 2 acts will make it through to the final.

Key	Winner	Runner's Up	3rd Place	Finalist

Name of Act	Act	Semifinal (week)	Position Reached

== Semi-final rounds ==
Key	Judges' choice	Buzzed out	Finished in first place; Automatically advanced to the finals.	Finished in second place; Won the judges' vote to the finals.	Finished in third place; Lost the judges' vote.

The acts are listed of chronological appearance.

=== Semi-final 1 ===
- 11/3/2016
- Guest: Hari Won

Order	Artist	Act	Buzzers And Judges Vote			Result
Order	Artist	Act	Trấn Thành	Việt Hương	Huy Tuấn	Result
1	Mi Ngân	Drumming Singing				Lost Judges Vote
2	Nguyễn Minh Phương	Magician				Eliminated
3	Nhóm Thiên Đường	Singer				Advanced
4	Hà Bảo Anh	Season				Eliminated
5	Nhóm HCYA	Drama, Theater				Eliminated
6	Văn Lam - Đức Lợi	Magician				Won Judges Vote
7	Nhóm Oxy	Dancer				Eliminated

=== Semi Final 2 ===
Date 18/3/2016 Guest Huyền Trang

Order	Artist	Act	Buzzers And Judges Vote			Result-
Order	Artist	Act	Trấn Thành	Việt Hương	Huy Tuấn	Result-
1	Gaurav Sharma	Yoga				Eliminated
2	Võ Hương Giang	Xam Singing				Advanced
3	Lê Đình Cần	Singing				Eliminated
4	Hà My	Color				Lost Judges Vote
5	Lê Tiến - Lê Linh	Cheo SInging				Eliminated
6	Nguyễn Ngọc Quang	Drawing light lamp				Eliminated
7	Nhóm CC Kids	Dance Group				Won Judges Vote

=== Semi Final 3 ===
Date 25/3/2016 Guest Võ Hạ Trâm

Order	Artist	Act	Buzzers And Judges Vote			Result
Order	Artist	Act	Trấn Thành	Việt Hương	Huy Tuấn	Result
1	Thanh Hà - Thanh Huy	Jumping				Eliminated
2	Quang Huy - Kiến Văn	Singer				Lost Judges Vote
3	Hoàng Bảo	Ventriloquist				Eliminated
4	Ngọc Đức	Popping Dancer				Eliminated
5	Nhóm Trà Đá	Drama				Eliminated
6	Quỳnh Anh	Singer				Advanced
7	Nhóm 218	Jumping LEDs				Won Judges Vote

=== Semi Final 4 ===
Date 1/4/2016 Guest Trang Pháp

Order	Artist	Act	Buzzers And Judges Vote			Result
Order	Artist	Act	Trấn Thành	Việt Hương	Huy Tuấn	Result
1	Bar Times	Sports Street				Lost Judges Vote
2	Đỗ Trung Lương	Dan Quarter				Won Judges Vote
3	Chu Văn Huân - Trần Mỹ Lệ	Dance				Eliminated
4	Đào Duy Ninh	Singer				Eliminated
5	Phúc Thịnh	Magician				Eliminated
6	Lê Thị Phương Thảo	Singer				Eliminated
7	Nguyễn Trọng Nhân	Band Drummer				Advanced

=== Semi Final 5 ===
Date 8/4/2016 Guest Hoàng Quyên

Order	Artist	Act	Buzzers And Judges Vote			Result
Order	Artist	Act	Trấn Thành	Việt Hương	Huy Tuấn	Result
1	Lê Thị Bích Ngọc	Dance				Lost Judges Vote
2	Hoàng Minh	Illusion				Eliminated
3	Nguyễn Ngọc Hải	Popping Dancer				Advanced
4	Mỹ Linh	Singer				Eliminated
5	Nhóm P4	Singing Performing Instruments				Eliminated
6	Anh Tú	Magician				Eliminated
7	Dàn hợp xướng Công giáo trẻ Hà Nội	Choir				Won Judges Vote

=== Semi Final 6 ===
Date 15/4/2016 Guest Don Nguyễn

Order	Artist	Act	Buzzers And Judges Vote			Result
Order	Artist	Act	Trấn Thành	Việt Hương	Huy Tuấn	Result
1	Nhóm BCA	Luminous Dance				Eliminated
2	Juun Đăng Dũng	Singer				Eliminated
3	Xuân Hiếu - Thái Vũ (Nhóm Candy Crew)	Popping Dancer				Won Judges Vote
4	Thy Kiều*	Saxophone Player				Won Judges Vote
5	Thanh Tâm	Singer				Eliminated
6	Nguyễn Duy Khánh	Preparation, Circus				Eliminated
7	Hà Như Minh - Hà My	Dance				Advanced

=== Semi Final 7 ===
Date 22/4/2016 Guest (Băng Di, BB Trần, Huỳnh Mến), Hoàng Yến Chibi

Order	Artist	Act	Buzzers And Judges Vote			Result
Order	Artist	Act	Trấn Thành	Việt Hương	Huy Tuấn	Result
1	Lê Trung	Kung Fu				Eliminated
2	Thanh Thúy	Singer				Lost Judges Vote
3	Quốc Bảo - Phú Lâm	Beatboxing and popping				Eliminated
4	Phương Anh	Opera				Eliminated
5	Phong Hải	Beatboxing				Advanced
6	Duy Anh	Magician				Eliminated
7	Nhóm Gió	Shadow play				Won Judges Vote

=== Wild cards ===
Order	Artist	Act	Buzzers And Judges Vote			Result
Order	Artist	Act	Trấn Thành	Việt Hương	Huy Tuấn	Result
1	Gaurav Sharma	Yoga				Eliminated
2	Nguyễn Ngọc Quang	Drawing light lamp				Eliminated
3	Bar Times	Sports Street				Eliminated
4	Phúc Thịnh	Magician				Advanced
5	Thanh Thúy	Singer				Eliminated

=== Final Rounds Part 1 ===
Order	Artist	Act	Buzzers And Judges Vote			Result
Order	Artist	Act	Trấn Thành	Việt Hương	Huy Tuấn	Result
1	Dàn hợp xướng Công giáo trẻ Hà Nội	Choir				Eliminated
2	Quỳnh Anh	Singer				Advanced
3	Xuân Hiếu - Thái Vũ (Nhóm Candy Crew)	Popping Dancer				Eliminated
4	Nguyễn Trọng Nhân	Band				Advanced
5	Nguyễn Ngọc Hải	Popping Dancer				Eliminated
6	Nhóm Thiên Đường	Singer				Eliminated
7	Văn Lam - Đức Lợi	Magician				Eliminated
8	Võ Hương Giang	Xam Singer				Eliminated

=== Final Rounds Part 2 ===
Order	Artist	Act	Buzzers And Judges Vote			Result
Order	Artist	Act	Trấn Thành	Việt Hương	Huy Tuấn	Result
1	Phúc Thịnh	Magician				Eliminated
2	Hà My	Color				Eliminated
3	Nhóm Gió	Dancers				Eliminated
4	Phong Hải	Beatboxer				Eliminated
5	Hà Như Minh - Hà My	Dance				Eliminated
6	Thy Kiều	Saxophone player				Eliminated
7	Đỗ Trung Lương	Dan Quarter				Advanced
8	Nhóm 218	Jumping LEDs				Advanced

=== Grand Final ===
Order	Artist	Act	Result				
Order	Artist	Act	Result	1	Nguyễn Trọng Nhân	Drummer Band	Winner
2	Nhóm 218	Jumping Leds	Joint 3rd Place				
3	Đỗ Trung Lương	Dan Quarter	Runner's Up				
4	Quỳnh Anh	Singer	Joint 3rd Place				
