= Dogs in the City =

- Genre: Reality television
- Starring: Justin Silver
- Country of origin: United States
- Original language: English
- No. of seasons: 1
- No. of episodes: 6

Production
- Executive producers: Julie Weitz; Carol Mendelsohn; Jen O'Connell; Nick Emmerson
- Running time: 43 minutes
- Production companies: Raquel Productions; Shed Media US; Carol Mendelsohn Productions

Original release
- Network: CBS
- Release: May 30 – July 11, 2012

Dogs in the City is an American reality television series that premiered on May 30, 2012, on CBS in the United States. The series features New York City stand-up comedian, personal trainer, and self-proclaimed "dog guru" Justin Silver, who helps his clients solve various issues they are having with their pets. The show ended on July 11, 2012.
