= How to Be a Gentleman =

American sitcom television series

- Genre: Sitcom
- Created by: David Hornsby
- Starring: David Hornsby; Kevin Dillon; Dave Foley; Mary Lynn Rajskub; Rhys Darby; Nancy Lenehan
- Composer: John Swihart
- Country of origin: United States
- Original language: English
- No. of seasons: 1
- No. of episodes: 9

Production
- Executive producers: David Hornsby; Adam Chase; Ted Schachter
- Producer: Michael Borkow
- Camera setup: Multi-camera
- Running time: 30 minutes
- Production companies: Media Rights Capital; CBS Productions

Original release
- Network: CBS
- Release: September 29, 2011 – June 23, 2012

How to Be a Gentleman is an American sitcom television series that originally aired on CBS from September 29, 2011, to June 23, 2012. Lead actor David Hornsby created the series, adapting the nonfiction book of the same name by John Bridges.

How to Be a Gentleman received a thirteen episode order for its initial season and the series was placed on the network's Thursday night lineup at 8:30 PM Eastern, replacing Rules of Engagement in that slot as the latter series was going to move to Saturday nights once it launched for the season. The first two episodes, however, failed to draw a high rating and were unable to hold the audience of lead in program The Big Bang Theory, which was CBS’ highest rated sitcom. On October 7, 2011, CBS cancelled the series after three low-rated episodes. They also cut the episode order from 13 to 9 episodes, which effectively ended production as the series had just finished its ninth episode when the announcement was made. CBS announced that Rules of Engagement would be retaking its former time slot shortly thereafter, with How to Be a Gentleman moving to Saturday nights.

Although the reduction in episodes and move to Saturday did not officially result in the series’ cancellation, CBS finally pulled the plug after one further episode had aired after its ratings reflected a loss of half of the audience from the previous program, a rerun of Two and a Half Men. CBS later made the decision to burn off the remaining episodes on Saturday evenings over the summer, beginning on May 26.

== Premise ==
The series chronicles two former high school classmates, uptight etiquette columnist Andrew Carlson (Hornsby) and the more freewheeling, Iraq war veteran and personal trainer Bert Lansing (Kevin Dillon). While the two had an antagonistic relationship in high school, as adults, the two men feel like they can learn from each other by becoming friends living in Chicago.

== Cast ==
- David Hornsby as Andrew Carlson
- Kevin Dillon as Bert Lansing
- Dave Foley as Jerry Dunham
- Mary Lynn Rajskub as Janet
- Rhys Darby as Mike
- Nancy Lenehan as Diane Carlson

== Episodes ==
No.	Title	Directed by	Written by	Original release date	Prod. code	U.S. viewers (millions)
1	"Pilot"	Pamela Fryman	David Hornsby	September 29, 2011	101	8.98
When etiquette columnist Andrew Carlson is told he must adapt to the new, sexier style of his magazine, he hires his old high school bully Bert Lansing to help him become a "modern" man.
2	"How to Have a One-Night Stand"	Pamela Fryman	David Hornsby	October 6, 2011	102	7.58
Bert succeeds in getting Andrew to have a meaningless fling, but Andrew struggles to not get attached to the woman. Meanwhile, Andrew's sister, Janet, and her boyfriend, Mike, seek help from Diane to prepare them for Mike's green card interview.
3	"How to Attend Your Ex-Fiancee's Wedding"	Fred Savage	Jeff Astrof	October 15, 2011	103	2.43
Bert talks Andrew into attending his ex-fiancee's wedding for closure. But when Andrew discovers his ex met her husband while she and Andrew were still together, he must decide how to confront her.
4	"How to Share a Relationship"	Fred Savage	Jeff Astrof	May 26, 2012	104	1.45
Andrew and Bert each have their own unique relationship with the same woman, but Andrew starts to feel short-changed when she spends every night in Bert's room. Meanwhile, Mike causes Janet's injury at Bert's gym, then tries to cover it up.
5	"How to Be Draft Andrew"	Alex Hardcastle	Michael Borkow	May 26, 2012	105	1.39
When Bert sends out angry emails that Andrew drafted but never sent, Andrew scrambles to make things right with the recipients. Meanwhile, Andrew turns the tables on Bert and forces him to stop filing away his emotions when his judgmental father (Bill Smitrovich) shows up.
6	"How to Dip Your Pen in the Company Ink"	Alex Hardcastle	Michael Lisbe & Nate Reger	June 2, 2012	106	1.84
When Andrew refuses to make a move on his attractive new assistant, Bert teaches him a "lesson" by going out with her.
7	"How to Get Along With Your Boss's New Girlfriend"	Gary Halvorson	David Hornsby & Jeff Astrof	June 9, 2012	107	1.63
When Andrew is left picking up Jerry's slack at work, he asks Bert to come on board to serve as his new life coach, but quickly realizes he might have made a serious mistake.
8	"How to Upstage Thanksgiving"	Tristram Shapeero	Justin Halpern & Patrick Schumacker	June 16, 2012	108	1.45
When Andrew skips Thanksgiving dinner with his family to rekindle a relationship with his ex-fiancee, Bert reminds him of his newfound "manhood" and shows him the error of his ways.
9	"How to Be Shallow"	Gary Halvorson	Robin Shorr	June 23, 2012	109	1.56
When Andrew is given the opportunity to ask out a model, he is forced to realize that even a gentleman can be shallow about some things. Meanwhile, Bert discovers that events from his past may be the reason for his commitment issues.

== Reception ==
The show received negative reviews from critics. It averaged a score of 45 out of 100 on Metacritic. The website's users have given it a 3.7 out of 10, indicating generally unfavorable reviews.

The premiere recorded 8.98 million viewers and a 2.7 Adults 18-49 rating. This rating compared poorly to that of its lead-in, The Big Bang Theory, which recorded 14.74 million viewers and a 4.9 in the 18-49 demo, as well as the shows in CBS's Monday night comedy block for the same week, all of which ranked in the top 25 for the week with Adults 18–49.

Season	Timeslot	Season premiere	Season finale	TV Season	Ranking	Viewers (in millions)
1	Thursday 8:30pm (September 29, 2011 – October 6, 2011); Saturday 8:30 pm (October 15, 2011 – June 23, 2012)	September 29, 2011	June 23, 2012	2011-2012	#59	8.67

== Home media ==
The complete series of How to be a Gentleman was released on DVD and digital on June 9, 2020.
