= 3 (TV series) =

American reality television series

- Genre: Reality television
- Presented by: Alex Miranda
- Composer: Miles Hankins
- Country of origin: United States
- Original language: English
- No. of seasons: 1
- No. of episodes: 8

Production
- Executive producers: Jane Lipsitz; Dan Cutforth; Chris Columbus; Avi Nir; Ami Glam
- Running time: 43 minutes
- Production companies: Magical Elves; 1492 Television; Keshet Broadcasting

Original release
- Network: CBS
- Release: July 26 – July 29, 2012

3 is an American reality television series that premiered on July 26, 2012, on CBS in the United States. It revolved around three very different women who are brought together to search for love. They provided emotional support to each other as they deal with the realities of dating. The series was hosted by Alex Miranda. The format was based on a similar series that was made in Israel.

== Broadcast ==
On July 31, 2012, CBS announced that the show had been pulled from the schedule effective immediately, following low ratings for its first two episodes.

On August 5, 2012, CBS began releasing new episodes online. '@3_CBS' on Twitter confirms that 3 is now an online series.

In the spring of 2013, VH1 Brasil reran the original "3" series in its entirety.

== Other versions ==
On 3 May 2012, it was announced that a British version would air on ITV2. This was presented by Emma Willis. The series, named Girlfriends, ran for 2 seasons in 2012 and 2013.
