= Quyền Linh =

Vietnamese comedian, film actor, stage performer and television presenter

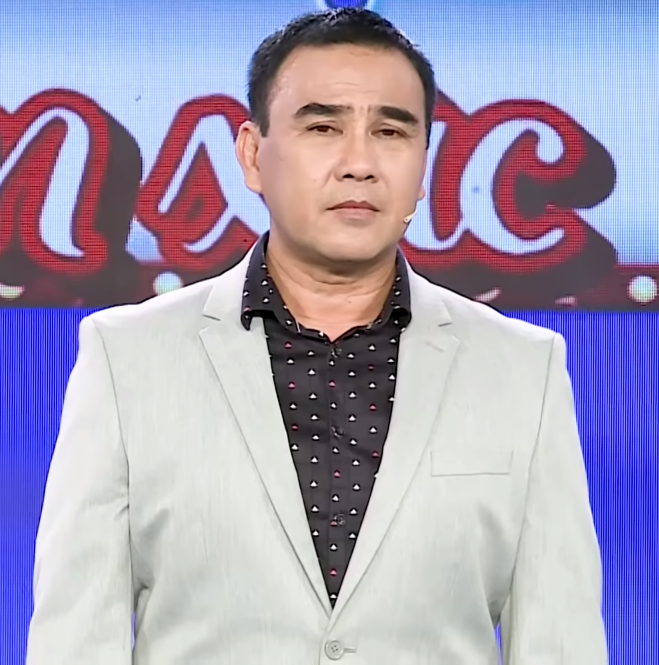
- Quyền Linh in 2020
- Born: Mai Huyền Linh; July 28, 1969 (age 57); Châu Thành, Mỹ Tho, South Vietnam
- Occupations: Comedian; Film actor; Stage performer; Television presenter
- Years active: 1992–present
- Spouse: Dạ Thảo (m. 2005)
- Children: Mai Thảo Linh; Mai Thảo Ngọc
- Awards: National Professional Stage Arts Festival; Silver Medal (1995); Golden Apricot Award; Best TV Actor (1999); Best Host (2006, 2007, 2008)

Mai Huyền Linh (born July 28, 1969), commonly known by his stage name Quyền Linh, is a Vietnamese comedian, film actor, stage performer and television presenter, and is a member of the Communist Party of Vietnam. Since 1992, he has appeared in hundreds of films and television dramas and is considered as one of the most beloved actors in Vietnam. He also holds the record for the most Golden Apricot Awards won by any artist, with a total of 6 awards.

In addition to his acting career, he is also a well-known MC, having hosted dozens of television programs across various genres. Notably, "Vượt lên chính mình", a program that he both directed and hosted, won five Golden Apricot Awards from 2005 to 2008.

He currently serves as the Vice President of the Vietnam Cinema Association, a member of the Executive Committee of the Ho Chi Minh City Cinema Association, and is the youngest person elected to this position. He was appointed Director of Gia Định Film Studio by the City Cinema Association in 2007. On October 10, 2009, the Ho Chi Minh City Cinema Association Party Cell held a ceremony to admit Quyền Linh into the Communist Party of Vietnam.

He is currently married and has two daughters, Thảo Linh (Cinderella) and Thảo Ngọc (Chestnut). Since 2019, he is also the sponsor of the O2O Girl Band.

== Personal life ==
In September 2005, Quyền Linh married Dạ Thảo, is a fan of his for a long time. The couple has two daughters, named Mai Thảo Linh and Mai Thảo Ngọc. In addition, Quyền Linh also has a younger brother, director Quyền Lộc.
