= MTV Vietnam =

- Broadcast area: Vietnam
- Headquarters: Ho Chi Minh City, Vietnam

Programming
- Picture format: 4:3 576i SDTV

Ownership
- Owner: Paramount Networks EMEAA (Paramount Global); IMC Group; Vietnam Television (partial management)
- Sister channels: MTV Southeast Asia; Comedy Central; Paramount Network; Nickelodeon; MTV Live; Today TV; You TV

History
- Launched: 1 July 2011; 14 years ago
- Replaced: MTV Asia
- Closed: 1 January 2023; 3 years ago

Links
- Website: MTVwe.com

MTV Vietnam was a music channel owned by Paramount Networks EMEAA, a division of Paramount Global and UTV Corporation, a division of BHD Group and was under management of Vietnam Television until 2015 when IMC became the manager of MTV Vietnam. The network featured domestic and international pop music along with music news features and limited reality television programming subtitled into Vietnamese.

In mid-2000s, in Vietnam, it only broadcast MTV Asia until 2008, when the company BHD have negotiations with MTV Singapore to buy the copyright and format them to Vietnamese program. On 1 July 2011, MTV Vietnam had officially broadcast in Vietnam with the joint venture of BHD buy the copyright and under management of Cable Television Editorial Board (later renamed the Multimedia Television Editorial Board) by Vietnam Television (VTV). The first show from MTV Vietnam is "MTV Vietnam Request Hour" which broadcast Vietnamese and international song that requested by Vietnamese viewer/audience. Then released the few shows when on 2 February 2015 when IMC Group now managed and operated MTV Vietnam, but still MTV Vietnam only does 4:3 aspect ratio.

MTV Vietnam ceased its broadcasting on January 1, 2023, with the last music that MTV Vietnam put it's 'LỜI NÓI DỐI SAU NỤ CƯỜI' by K-ICM, because Paramount released Paramount+ in Vietnam that release in mid 2024.

== Shows ==
=== Exclusive shows ===
- Bước Nhảy Xì-tin (X-tyle Dance Move)
- Giải thưởng video ca nhạc Việt Nam (Vietnam Video Music Awards)
- It's Your MTV
- MTV at the Movies
- MTV Chart Attack
- MTV Cover
- MTV News
- MTV Now
- MTV Thích mê (Most Wanted)
- MTV Tìm kiếm VJ
- MTV WOW
- Star at MTV
- Thần tượng đột kích (School Attack)
- Vietnam's Got Talent

=== International shows with Vietnamese subtitles ===
- BIGBANG Alive Around the World
- Catfish: The TV Show
- Geordie Shore
- Geordie Shore: The Reunion
- The Hard Times of RJ Berger
- The Inbetweeners
- Jersey Shore
- The L.A. Complex
- MTV Cribs
- MTV European Music Awards
- MTV Movie Awards
- MTV Video Music Awards
- My Super Sweet 16
- Paris Hilton's British Best Friend
- Pimp My Ride with Xzibit
- Pranked
- Ridiculousness
- Shibuhara Girls
- Underemployed
- Washington Heights
- Young and Married

== Availability ==
- HTVC
- Hanoicab
- K+
- VTVcab
- myTV (IPTV)
- FPT (IPTV)

== See also ==
- MTV (Music Television)
- MTV Networks Asia Pacific
- MTV Southeast Asia
