= 2012–13 United States network television schedule =

Television schedule for the fall of 2012

The 2012–13 network television schedule for the five major English-language commercial broadcast networks in the United States covers primetime hours from September 2012 through August 2013. The schedule is followed by a list per network of returning series, new series, and series canceled after the 2011–12 season.

NBC was the first to announce its fall schedule on May 13, 2012, followed by Fox on May 14, then ABC on May 15, CBS on May 16, and The CW on May 17, 2012.

PBS is not included; member stations have local flexibility over most of their schedules and broadcast times for network shows may vary. The CW is not included on weekends, when it does not offer network programming. Ion Television airs primarily syndicated reruns, along with new episodes of The Listener from Canada's CTV and professional wrestling program WWE Main Event. MyNetworkTV also offers syndicated reruns, with limited original programming.

New series are highlighted in bold.

All times are U.S. Eastern Time and Pacific Time (except for some live sports or events). Subtract one hour for Central and Mountain times.

Each of the 30 highest-rated shows is listed with its rank and rating as determined by Nielsen Media Research.

== Legend ==
- Light blue indicates local programming.
- Gray indicates encore programming.
- Blue-gray indicates news programming.
- Light green indicates sporting events.
- Light purple indicates movies.
- Red indicates series being burned off and other irregularly scheduled programs, including specials.
- Yellow indicates the top-10 most watched programs of the season.
- Cyan indicates the top-20 most watched programs of the season.
- Magenta indicates the top-30 most watched programs of the season.

== Sunday ==
Network		7:00 p.m.	7:30 p.m.	8:00 p.m.	8:30 p.m.	9:00 p.m.	9:30 p.m.	10:00 p.m.	10:30 p.m.
ABC	Fall	America's Funniest Home Videos		Once Upon a Time		Revenge		**666 Park Avenue**	
ABC	Winter	America's Funniest Home Videos		Once Upon a Time		Revenge		Castle	
ABC	Spring	America's Funniest Home Videos		Once Upon a Time		Revenge		**Red Widow**	
ABC	Summer	America's Funniest Home Videos		Celebrity Wife Swap		**Whodunnit?**		Castle (R)	
ABC	Late summer	America's Funniest Home Videos		Secret Millionaire		**Whodunnit?**		Castle (R)	
CBS	Fall	NFL on CBS (4:25 p.m.)	60 Minutes (16/8.0) (Tied with Criminal Minds)		The Amazing Race		The Good Wife (23/7.3) (Tied with Body of Proof, CSI: NY, The; Following and Survivor: Philippines)		The Mentalist (continued until 11:30 p.m.) (18/7.7) (Tied with CSI: Crime Scene Investigation, Grey's Anatomy, Modern Family and Vegas)
CBS	Winter	60 Minutes (16/8.0) (Tied with Criminal Minds)		The Amazing Race		The Good Wife (23/7.3) (Tied with Body of Proof, CSI: NY, The; Following and Survivor: Philippines)		The Mentalist (18/7.7) (Tied with CSI: Crime Scene; Investigation, Grey's Anatomy, Modern Family and Vegas)	
CBS	Spring	60 Minutes (16/8.0) (Tied with Criminal Minds)		The Amazing Race		The Good Wife (23/7.3) (Tied with Body of Proof, CSI: NY, The; Following and Survivor: Philippines)		The Mentalist (18/7.7) (Tied with CSI: Crime Scene; Investigation, Grey's Anatomy, Modern Family and Vegas)	
CBS	Summer	60 Minutes (16/8.0) (Tied with Criminal Minds)		Big Brother		The Good Wife (23/7.3) (Tied with Body of Proof, CSI: NY, The; Following and Survivor: Philippines)		The Mentalist (18/7.7) (Tied with CSI: Crime Scene; Investigation, Grey's Anatomy, Modern Family and Vegas)	
CBS	Mid-summer	60 Minutes (16/8.0) (Tied with Criminal Minds)		Big Brother		Unforgettable		The Mentalist (18/7.7) (Tied with CSI: Crime Scene; Investigation, Grey's Anatomy, Modern Family and Vegas)	
Fox	Fall	Fox NFL (4:25 p.m.)	The Cleveland Show	The Simpsons	Bob's Burgers	Family Guy	American Dad!	Local programming	
Fox	Winter	Bob's Burgers (R)	The Cleveland Show	The Simpsons	Bob's Burgers	Family Guy	American Dad!	Local programming	
Fox	Spring	Bob's Burgers (R)	The Cleveland Show	The Simpsons	Bob's Burgers	Family Guy	American Dad!	Local programming	
Fox	Summer	The Cleveland Show (R)	American Dad! (R)	The Simpsons	Bob's Burgers	Family Guy	Family Guy (R)	Local programming	
Fox	Mid-summer	The Cleveland Show (R)	The Simpsons (R)	The Simpsons	Bob's Burgers	Family Guy	American Dad! (R)	Local programming	
Fox	Late summer	American Dad! (R)	The Simpsons (R)	The Simpsons	Bob's Burgers	Family Guy	Family Guy (R)	Local programming	
NBC	Fall	Football Night in America		NBC Sunday Night Football (8:20 p.m.) (continued to game completion) (2/12.4)					
NBC	Winter	Dateline NBC				The Apprentice			
NBC	Spring	Encore programming				The Apprentice			
NBC	Late spring	Encore programming						**Crossing Lines**	
NBC	Summer	Encore programming						**Crossing Lines**	

== Monday ==
Network		8:00 p.m.	8:30 p.m.	9:00 p.m.	9:30 p.m.	10:00 p.m.	10:30 p.m.
ABC	Fall	Dancing with the Stars (6/9.9)				Castle (15/8.1)	
ABC	Winter	The Bachelor				Castle (15/8.1)	
ABC	Spring	Dancing with the Stars (6/9.9)				Castle (15/8.1)	
ABC	Summer	The Bachelorette				**Mistresses**	
CBS	Fall	How I Met Your Mother	**Partners**	2 Broke Girls (28/6.8) (Tied with Hawaii Five-0)	Mike & Molly	Hawaii Five-0 (28/6.8) (Tied with 2 Broke Girls)	
CBS	Late fall	How I Met Your Mother	Two and a Half Men (R)	2 Broke Girls (28/6.8) (Tied with Hawaii Five-0)	Mike & Molly	Hawaii Five-0 (28/6.8) (Tied with 2 Broke Girls)	
CBS	Winter	How I Met Your Mother	Rules of Engagement	2 Broke Girls (28/6.8) (Tied with Hawaii Five-0)	Mike & Molly	Hawaii Five-0 (28/6.8) (Tied with 2 Broke Girls)	
CBS	Spring	How I Met Your Mother	Mike & Molly (R)	2 Broke Girls (28/6.8) (Tied with Hawaii Five-0)	Mike & Molly	Hawaii Five-0 (28/6.8) (Tied with 2 Broke Girls)	
CBS	Summer	How I Met Your Mother	Mike & Molly (R)	2 Broke Girls (28/6.8) (Tied with Hawaii Five-0)	Mike & Molly	**Under the Dome**	
The CW	Fall	90210		Gossip Girl		Local programming	
The CW	Winter	**The Carrie Diaries**		90210		Local programming	
The CW	Spring	Oh Sit!		90210		Local programming	
The CW	Late spring	Oh Sit!		**The Carrie Diaries** (R)		Local programming	
The CW	Summer	Hart of Dixie (R)		Breaking Pointe		Local programming	
Fox	Fall	Bones		**The Mob Doctor**		Local programming	
Fox	Winter	Bones		**The Following** (23/7.3) (Tied with Body of Proof, CSI: NY, The Good Wife and Survivor: Philippines)		Local programming	
Fox	Spring	Bones		**The Following** (23/7.3) (Tied with Body of Proof, CSI: NY, The Good Wife and Survivor: Philippines)		Local programming	
Fox	Summer	Raising Hope (R)	**The Goodwin Games**	New Girl (R)	**The Mindy Project** (R)	Local programming	
Fox	Mid-summer	Raising Hope (R)		New Girl (R)	**The Mindy Project** (R)	Local programming	
NBC	Fall	The Voice (10/8.7) (Tied with Two and a Half Men)				**Revolution**	
NBC	Winter	The Biggest Loser				**Deception**	
NBC	Spring	The Voice (10/8.7) (Tied with Two and a Half Men)				**Revolution**	
NBC	Summer	American Ninja Warrior		**Get Out Alive with Bear Grylls**		**Siberia**	

== Tuesday ==
Network		8:00 p.m.	8:30 p.m.	9:00 p.m.	9:30 p.m.	10:00 p.m.	10:30 p.m.
ABC	Fall	Dancing with the Stars (7/9.2) (Tied with American Idol)		Happy Endings	Don't Trust the B— in Apartment 23	Private Practice	
ABC	Winter	**The Taste**		Happy Endings	Don't Trust the B— in Apartment 23	Private Practice	
ABC	Late winter	Celebrity Wife Swap		**The Taste**		Body of Proof (23/7.3) (Tied with CSI: NY, The Following, The Good Wife and Survivor: Philippines)	
ABC	Spring	**Splash**		Dancing with the Stars (7/9.2) (Tied with American Idol)		Body of Proof (23/7.3) (Tied with CSI: NY, The Following, The Good Wife and Survivor: Philippines)	
ABC	Summer	Extreme Weight Loss				Body of Proof (23/7.3) (Tied with CSI: NY, The Following, The Good Wife and Survivor: Philippines)	
CBS	Fall	NCIS (1/13.5)		NCIS: Los Angeles (4/11.0)		**Vegas** (18/7.7) (Tied with CSI: Crime Scene Investigation, Grey's Anatomy, The Mentalist and Modern Family)	
CBS	Winter	NCIS (1/13.5)		NCIS: Los Angeles (4/11.0)		**Vegas** (18/7.7) (Tied with CSI: Crime Scene Investigation, Grey's Anatomy, The Mentalist and Modern Family)	
CBS	Spring	NCIS (1/13.5)		NCIS: Los Angeles (4/11.0)		**Golden Boy**	
CBS	Summer	NCIS (1/13.5)		NCIS: Los Angeles (4/11.0)		**Brooklyn DA**	
CBS	Mid-summer	NCIS (1/13.5)		NCIS: Los Angeles (4/11.0)		Person of Interest (R)	
The CW	Fall	Hart of Dixie		**Emily Owens, M.D.**		Local programming	
The CW	Winter	Hart of Dixie		**Cult**		Local programming	
The CW	Spring	Hart of Dixie		Hart of Dixie		Local programming	
The CW	Summer	Whose Line Is It Anyway?		**Perfect Score**		Local programming	
The CW	Mid-summer	Whose Line Is It Anyway?		**Capture**		Local programming	
Fox	Fall	Raising Hope	**Ben and Kate**	New Girl	**The Mindy Project**	Local programming	
Fox	Winter	Raising Hope		New Girl	**The Mindy Project**	Local programming	
Fox	Spring	Hell's Kitchen		New Girl	**The Mindy Project**	Local programming	
Fox	Summer	So You Think You Can Dance				Local programming	
NBC	Fall	The Voice (13/8.4)		**Go On**	**The New Normal**	Parenthood	
NBC	Winter	Betty White's Off Their Rockers		**Go On**	**The New Normal**	Parenthood	
NBC	Late winter	Betty White's Off Their Rockers		**Go On**	**The New Normal**	Smash	
NBC	Spring	The Voice (13/8.4)		**Ready for Love**			
NBC	Mid-spring	The Voice (13/8.4)				Grimm	
NBC	Summer	The Voice (13/8.4)		America's Got Talent			
NBC	Mid-summer	**Hollywood Game Night** (R)		America's Got Talent			

== Wednesday ==
Network		8:00 p.m.	8:30 p.m.	9:00 p.m.	9:30 p.m.	10:00 p.m.	10:30 p.m.
ABC	Fall	The Middle	**The Neighbors**	Modern Family (18/7.7) (Tied with CSI: Crime Scene Investigation, Grey's Anatomy, The Mentalist and Vegas)	Suburgatory	**Nashville**	
ABC	Winter	The Middle	**The Neighbors**	Modern Family (18/7.7) (Tied with CSI: Crime Scene Investigation, Grey's Anatomy, The Mentalist and Vegas)	Suburgatory	**Nashville**	
ABC	Spring	The Middle	Suburgatory	Modern Family (18/7.7) (Tied with CSI: Crime Scene Investigation, Grey's Anatomy, The Mentalist and Vegas)	**How to Live with Your Parents (For the Rest of Your Life)**	**Nashville**	
ABC	Mid-spring	The Middle	**Family Tools**	Modern Family (18/7.7) (Tied with CSI: Crime Scene Investigation, Grey's Anatomy, The Mentalist and Vegas)	**How to Live with Your Parents (For the Rest of Your Life)**	**Nashville**	
ABC	Summer	The Middle	**Family Tools**	Modern Family (18/7.7) (Tied with CSI: Crime Scene Investigation, Grey's Anatomy, The Mentalist and Vegas)	**How to Live with Your Parents (For the Rest of Your Life)**	**The Lookout**	
ABC	Mid-summer	The Middle	**Family Tools**	Modern Family (18/7.7) (Tied with CSI: Crime Scene Investigation, Grey's Anatomy, The Mentalist and Vegas)	**The Neighbors** (R)	**The Lookout**	
ABC	Late summer	The Middle	Suburgatory (R)	Modern Family (18/7.7) (Tied with CSI: Crime Scene Investigation, Grey's Anatomy, The Mentalist and Vegas)	**The Neighbors** (R)	**The Lookout**	
CBS	Fall	Survivor: Philippines (23/7.3) (Tied with Body of Proof, CSI: NY, The Following and The Good Wife)		Criminal Minds (16/8.0) (Tied with 60 Minutes)		CSI: Crime Scene Investigation (18/7.7) (Tied with Grey's Anatomy, The Mentalist, Modern Family and Vegas)	
CBS	Winter	Survivor: Caramoan – Fans vs. Favorites (30/6.7)		Criminal Minds (16/8.0) (Tied with 60 Minutes)		CSI: Crime Scene Investigation (18/7.7) (Tied with Grey's Anatomy, The Mentalist, Modern Family and Vegas)	
CBS	Spring	Survivor: Caramoan – Fans vs. Favorites (30/6.7)		Criminal Minds (16/8.0) (Tied with 60 Minutes)		CSI: Crime Scene Investigation (18/7.7) (Tied with Grey's Anatomy, The Mentalist, Modern Family and Vegas)	
CBS	Summer	**The American Baking Competition**		Criminal Minds (16/8.0) (Tied with 60 Minutes)		CSI: Crime Scene Investigation (18/7.7) (Tied with Grey's Anatomy, The Mentalist, Modern Family and Vegas)	
CBS	Mid-summer	Big Brother		**The American Baking Competition**		CSI: Crime Scene Investigation (18/7.7) (Tied with Grey's Anatomy, The Mentalist, Modern Family and Vegas)	
CBS	Late summer	Big Brother		Criminal Minds (R)		CSI: Crime Scene Investigation (18/7.7) (Tied with Grey's Anatomy, The Mentalist, Modern Family and Vegas)	
The CW		**Arrow**		Supernatural		Local programming	
Fox	Fall	The X Factor				Local programming	
Fox	Winter	American Idol (7/9.2) (Tied with Dancing with the Stars – Results)				Local programming	
Fox	Spring	American Idol (7/9.2) (Tied with Dancing with the Stars – Results)				Local programming	
Fox	Summer	MasterChef				Local programming	
NBC	Fall	**Animal Practice**	**Guys with Kids**	Law & Order: Special Victims Unit		**Chicago Fire**	
NBC	Late fall	Whitney	**Guys with Kids**	Law & Order: Special Victims Unit		**Chicago Fire**	
NBC	Winter	Whitney	**Guys with Kids**	Law & Order: Special Victims Unit		**Chicago Fire**	
NBC	Spring	Whitney	Whitney (R)	Law & Order: Special Victims Unit		**Chicago Fire**	
NBC	Mid-spring	Dateline NBC		Law & Order: Special Victims Unit		**Chicago Fire**	
NBC	Summer	America's Got Talent (R)		America's Got Talent		**Camp**	

== Thursday ==
Network		8:00 p.m.	8:30 p.m.	9:00 p.m.	9:30 p.m.	10:00 p.m.	10:30 p.m.
ABC	Fall	**Last Resort**		Grey's Anatomy (18/7.7) (Tied with CSI: Crime Scene Investigation, The Mentalist, Modern Family and Vegas)		Scandal	
ABC	Winter	**Zero Hour**		Grey's Anatomy (18/7.7) (Tied with CSI: Crime Scene Investigation, The Mentalist, Modern Family and Vegas)		Scandal	
ABC	Spring	Wife Swap		Grey's Anatomy (18/7.7) (Tied with CSI: Crime Scene Investigation, The Mentalist, Modern Family and Vegas)		Scandal	
ABC	Summer	Wipeout		**Motive**		Rookie Blue	
CBS	Fall	The Big Bang Theory (3/11.6)	Two and a Half Men (10/8.7) (Tied with The Voice)	Person of Interest (5/10.0)		**Elementary** (14/8.3)	
CBS	Winter	The Big Bang Theory (3/11.6)	Two and a Half Men (10/8.7) (Tied with The Voice)	Person of Interest (5/10.0)		**Elementary** (14/8.3)	
CBS	Spring	The Big Bang Theory (3/11.6)	Two and a Half Men (10/8.7) (Tied with The Voice)	Person of Interest (5/10.0)		**Elementary** (14/8.3)	
CBS	Summer	The Big Bang Theory (3/11.6)	Two and a Half Men (10/8.7) (Tied with The Voice)	Big Brother		**Elementary** (14/8.3)	
The CW		The Vampire Diaries		**Beauty & the Beast**		Local programming	
Fox	Fall	The X Factor		Glee		Local programming	
Fox	Winter	American Idol (9/8.9)		Glee		Local programming	
Fox	Spring	American Idol (9/8.9)		Glee		Local programming	
Fox	Summer	Hell's Kitchen		**Does Someone Have to Go?**		Local programming	
Fox	Mid-summer	Hell's Kitchen				Local programming	
Fox	Late summer	Glee (R)		New Girl (R)	**The Mindy Project** (R)	Local programming	
NBC	Fall	Saturday Night Live Weekend Update Thursday	Up All Night	The Office	Parks and Recreation	Rock Center with Brian Williams	
NBC	Mid-fall	30 Rock	Up All Night	The Office	Parks and Recreation	Rock Center with Brian Williams	
NBC	Winter	30 Rock	Parks and Recreation	The Office	**1600 Penn**	Rock Center with Brian Williams	
NBC	Mid-winter	Community	Parks and Recreation	The Office	**1600 Penn**	**Do No Harm**	
NBC	Late winter	Community	Parks and Recreation	The Office	**1600 Penn**	Law & Order: Special Victims Unit (R)	
NBC	Spring	Community	Parks and Recreation	The Office	**Go On**	**Hannibal**	
NBC	Mid-spring	Community	The Office (R)	The Office	Parks and Recreation	**Hannibal**	
NBC	Summer	**Save Me**		The Office	Parks and Recreation	**Hannibal**	
NBC	Mid-summer	**The Winner Is** (R)		**The Winner Is**		**Hollywood Game Night**	
NBC	Late summer	America's Got Talent (R)		**Hollywood Game Night** (R)		**Hollywood Game Night**	

== Friday ==
Network		8:00 p.m.	8:30 p.m.	9:00 p.m.	9:30 p.m.	10:00 p.m.	10:30 p.m.
ABC	Fall	Shark Tank		Primetime		20/20	
ABC	Mid-fall	Last Man Standing	**Malibu Country**	Shark Tank		20/20	
ABC	Winter	Last Man Standing	**Malibu Country**	Shark Tank		20/20	
ABC	Spring	Happy Endings		Shark Tank		20/20	
ABC	Summer	Shark Tank (R)		Primetime		20/20	
CBS	Fall	CSI: NY (23/7.3) (Tied with Body of Proof, The Following, The Good Wife and Survivor: Philippines)		**Made in Jersey**		Blue Bloods (12/8.5)	
CBS	Mid-fall	Undercover Boss		CSI: NY (23/7.3) (Tied with Body of Proof, The Following, The Good Wife and Survivor: Philippines)		Blue Bloods (12/8.5)	
CBS	Winter	**The Job**		CSI: NY (23/7.3) (Tied with Body of Proof, The Following, The Good Wife and Survivor: Philippines)		Blue Bloods (12/8.5)	
CBS	Late winter	Undercover Boss		CSI: NY (23/7.3) (Tied with Body of Proof, The Following, The Good Wife and Survivor: Philippines)		Blue Bloods (12/8.5)	
CBS	Spring	Undercover Boss		**Vegas** (18/7.7) (Tied with CSI: Crime Scene Investigation, Grey's Anatomy, The Mentalist and Modern Family)		Blue Bloods (12/8.5)	
CBS	Summer	Undercover Boss		Hawaii Five-0 (28/6.8) (Tied with 2 Broke Girls)		Blue Bloods (12/8.5)	
The CW	Fall	America's Next Top Model		Nikita		Local programming	
The CW	Late fall	Nikita		Encore programming		Local programming	
The CW	Winter	Nikita		Encore programming		Local programming	
The CW	Spring	Nikita		**Cult**		Local programming	
The CW	Mid-spring	Nikita		Supernatural (R)		Local programming	
The CW	Summer	**Cult**				Local programming	
The CW	Mid-summer	**Perfect Score**		America's Next Top Model		Local programming	
Fox	Fall	Kitchen Nightmares		Fringe		Local programming	
Fox	Winter	Kitchen Nightmares		Touch		Local programming	
Fox	Spring	Kitchen Nightmares		Touch		Local programming	
Fox	Summer	Bones (R)		**The Following** (R)		Local programming	
NBC	Fall	Encore programming		Grimm		Dateline NBC	
NBC	Winter	Dateline NBC				Rock Center with Brian Williams	
NBC	Spring	Fashion Star		Grimm		Rock Center with Brian Williams	
NBC	Mid-spring	Fashion Star		Dateline NBC		Rock Center with Brian Williams	
NBC	Summer	Dateline NBC				Rock Center with Brian Williams	
NBC	Mid-summer	Grimm		Dateline NBC			

Note: Community and Whitney were replaced by an encore programming on Friday nights.

== Saturday ==
Network		8:00 p.m.	8:30 p.m.	9:00 p.m.	9:30 p.m.	10:00 p.m.	10:30 p.m.
ABC	Fall	ESPN Saturday Night Football (continued to game completion)					
ABC	Winter	ABC Saturday Movie of the Week					
ABC	Spring	**Bet on Your Baby**		ABC Saturday Movie of the Week			
ABC	Summer	**Zero Hour**		**666 Park Avenue**		Encore programming	
CBS	Fall	Crimetime Saturday				48 Hours	
CBS	Late fall	**Made in Jersey**		Crimetime Saturday		48 Hours	
CBS	Winter	Crimetime Saturday				48 Hours	
CBS	Spring	Crimetime Saturday				48 Hours	
CBS	Summer	Crimetime Saturday				48 Hours	
Fox	Fall	**Fox College Football** (continued to game completion)					
Fox	Winter	COPS	COPS (R)	Kitchen Nightmares (R)		Local programming	
Fox	Late winter	COPS	COPS (R)	**The Following** (R)		Local programming	
Fox	Spring	Baseball Night in America (7:00 p.m.)				Local programming	
Fox	Summer	COPS (R)		Bones (R)		Local programming	
NBC	Fall	Encore programming					
NBC	Winter	American Ninja Warrior		Encore programming			
NBC	Spring	Smash		Encore programming			
NBC	Summer	Encore programming				**Do No Harm**	

== By network ==
=== ABC ===
Returning series:

- 20/20
- ABC Saturday Movie of the Week
- America's Funniest Home Videos
- The Bachelor
- The Bachelorette
- Body of Proof
- Castle
- Dancing with the Stars
- Don't Trust the B— in Apartment 23
- Extreme Weight Loss
- Grey's Anatomy
- Happy Endings
- Last Man Standing
- The Lookout
- The Middle
- Modern Family
- Once Upon a Time
- Primetime: What Would You Do?
- Private Practice
- Revenge
- Rookie Blue
- Saturday Night Football
- Scandal
- Secret Millionaire
- Shark Tank
- Suburgatory
- Wife Swap
- Wipeout

New series:

- **666 Park Avenue**
- **Bet on Your Baby** *
- **Family Tools** *
- **How to Live with Your Parents (For the Rest of Your Life)** *
- **Last Resort**
- **Malibu Country**
- **Mistresses** *
- **Motive** *
- **Nashville**
- **The Neighbors**
- **Red Widow** *
- **Splash** *
- **The Taste** *
- **Whodunnit?** *
- **Zero Hour** *

Not returning from 2011–12:

- Bachelor Pad
- Charlie's Angels
- Cougar Town (moved to TBS in 2013)
- Desperate Housewives
- Duets
- Extreme Makeover: Home Edition (moved to HGTV in 2020, returned to ABC in 2024–25)
- Final Witness
- GCB
- The Glass House
- Man Up! (burned off on ABC.com)
- Missing
- NY Med (returned in 2013–14)
- Pan Am
- Primetime
- The River
- Trust Us with Your Life
- Work It
- You Deserve It

=== CBS ===
Returning series:

- 2 Broke Girls
- 48 Hours
- 60 Minutes
- The Amazing Race
- The Big Bang Theory
- Big Brother
- Blue Bloods
- Criminal Minds
- CSI: Crime Scene Investigation
- CSI: NY
- The Good Wife
- Hawaii Five-0
- How I Met Your Mother
- The Mentalist
- Mike & Molly
- NCIS
- NCIS: Los Angeles
- Person of Interest
- Rules of Engagement
- Survivor
- Two and a Half Men
- Undercover Boss
- Unforgettable

New series:

- **The American Baking Competition** *
- **Brooklyn DA** *
- **Elementary**
- **Golden Boy** *
- **The Job** *
- **Made in Jersey**
- **Partners**
- **Under the Dome** *
- **Vegas**

Not returning from 2011–12:

- 3
- CSI: Miami
- Dogs in the City
- A Gifted Man
- How to Be a Gentleman
- NYC 22
- ¡Rob!

=== The CW ===
Returning series:

- 90210
- America's Next Top Model
- Breaking Pointe
- Gossip Girl
- Hart of Dixie
- Nikita
- Oh Sit!
- Supernatural
- The Vampire Diaries
- Whose Line Is It Anyway? (Note: Series revival; previously aired on ABC and ABC Family from 1998 to 2007.)

New series:

- **Arrow**
- **Beauty & the Beast**
- **Capture** *
- **The Carrie Diaries** *
- **Cult** *
- **Emily Owens, M.D.**
- **Perfect Score** *

Not returning from 2011–12:

- The Catalina
- H8R
- The L.A. Complex
- The Next: Fame Is at Your Doorstep
- One Tree Hill
- Remodeled
- Ringer
- The Secret Circle

=== Fox ===
Returning series:

- American Dad!
- American Idol
- Baseball Night in America
- Bob's Burgers
- Bones
- The Cleveland Show
- Cops
- Family Guy
- Fringe
- Glee
- Hell's Kitchen
- Kitchen Nightmares
- MasterChef
- New Girl
- NFL on Fox
- Raising Hope
- The Simpsons
- So You Think You Can Dance
- Touch
- The X Factor

New series:

- **Ben and Kate**
- **Does Someone Have to Go?** *
- **Fox College Football**
- **The Following** *
- **The Goodwin Games** *
- **The Mindy Project**
- **The Mob Doctor**

Not returning from 2011–12:

- Alcatraz
- Allen Gregory
- Breaking In
- The Choice
- The Finder
- House
- I Hate My Teenage Daughter
- Napoleon Dynamite
- Q'Viva! The Chosen
- Take Me Out
- Terra Nova

=== Ion Television ===
Returning series:

- Flashpoint
- The Listener (moved from NBC)

New series:

- **WWE Main Event**

=== NBC ===
Returning series:

- 30 Rock
- America's Got Talent
- American Ninja Warrior (moved from G4)
- The Apprentice
- Betty White's Off Their Rockers
- The Biggest Loser
- Community
- Dateline NBC
- Fashion Star
- Football Night in America
- Grimm
- Law & Order: Special Victims Unit
- NBC Sunday Night Football
- The Office
- Parenthood
- Parks and Recreation
- Rock Center with Brian Williams
- Saturday Night Live Weekend Update Thursday
- Smash
- Up All Night
- The Voice
- Whitney

New series:

- **1600 Penn** *
- **Animal Practice**
- **Camp** *
- **Chicago Fire**
- **Crossing Lines** *
- **Deception** *
- **Do No Harm** *
- **Get Out Alive with Bear Grylls** *
- **Go On**
- **Guys with Kids**
- **Hannibal** *
- **Hollywood Game Night** *
- **The New Normal**
- **Next Caller**
- **Ready for Love** *
- **Revolution**
- **Save Me** *
- **Siberia** *
- **Take It All**
- **The Winner Is** *

Not returning from 2011–12:

- Are You There, Chelsea?
- Awake
- Bent
- Best Friends Forever
- Chuck
- Escape Routes
- Fear Factor (moved to MTV in 2017)
- The Firm
- Free Agents
- Harry's Law
- Love in the Wild
- The Playboy Club
- Prime Suspect
- Stars Earn Stripes
- Who Do You Think You Are? (moved to TLC; returned to NBC in 2021–22)
- Who's Still Standing?

== Renewals and cancellations ==
=== Full season pickups ===
==== ABC ====
- Nashville—Picked up for a full season on November 12, 2012.
- The Neighbors—Picked up for a full season on October 29, 2012.
- Scandal—Picked up for a full season on October 29, 2012.
- Shark Tank—Picked up 2 additional episodes, totaling the season to 24 episodes on October 22, 2012. Plus 2 additional episodes on March 5, 2013, totaling the season to 26 episodes.

==== CBS ====
- Elementary—Picked up for a full season on October 23, 2012.
- Vegas—Picked up for a full 22-episode season on October 23, 2012, which was later reduced to 21 episodes.

==== The CW ====
- Arrow—Picked up for a full season on October 22, 2012.
- Beauty & the Beast—Picked up for a full season on November 9, 2012.

==== Fox ====
- Ben and Kate—Picked up for an 18-episode full season on October 8, 2012.
- The Mindy Project—Picked up for a 22-episode full season on October 8, 2012. plus 2 additional episodes on October 16, 2012, for a 24-episode season.

==== NBC ====
- Chicago Fire—Picked up for a full season on November 8, 2012.
- Go On—Picked up for a full season on October 2, 2012.
- Law & Order: Special Victims Unit—Picked up two additional episodes, totaling the season to 24 episodes on December 6, 2012.
- The New Normal—Picked up for a full season on October 2, 2012.
- Revolution—Picked up for a full 22-episode season on October 2, 2012, which was later reduced to 20 episodes.

=== Renewals ===
==== ABC ====
- 20/20—Renewed for a thirty-fifth season on May 14, 2013.
- America's Funniest Home Videos—Renewed for a twenty-fourth season on May 14, 2013.
- The Bachelor—Renewed for an eighteenth season on May 14, 2013.
- Castle—Renewed for a sixth season on May 10, 2013.
- Dancing with the Stars—Renewed for a seventeenth season on May 14, 2013.
- Grey's Anatomy—Renewed for a tenth season on May 10, 2013.
- Last Man Standing—Renewed for a third season on May 10, 2013.
- The Middle—Renewed for a fifth season on May 10, 2013.
- Modern Family—Renewed for a fifth season on May 10, 2013.
- Nashville—Renewed for a second season on May 10, 2013.
- The Neighbors—Renewed for a second season on May 11, 2013.
- Once Upon a Time—Renewed for a third season on May 10, 2013.
- Revenge—Renewed for a third season on May 10, 2013.
- Saturday Night Football—Six more games were announced on March 5, 2013.
- Scandal—Renewed for a third season on May 10, 2013.
- Shark Tank—Renewed for a fifth season on May 14, 2013.
- Suburgatory—Renewed for a third season on May 10, 2013.
- The Taste—Renewed for a second season on May 14, 2013.
- Wife Swap—Renewed for a third season on July 31, 2013.

==== CBS ====
- 2 Broke Girls—Renewed for a third season on March 27, 2013.
- The Amazing Race—Renewed for a twenty-third season on March 27, 2013.
- The Big Bang Theory—Renewed for a seventh season on January 12, 2011.
- Blue Bloods—Renewed for a fourth season on March 27, 2013.
- CSI: Crime Scene Investigation—Renewed for a fourteenth season on March 20, 2013.
- Criminal Minds—Renewed for a ninth season on May 9, 2013.
- Elementary—Renewed for a second season on March 27, 2013.
- The Good Wife—Renewed for a fifth season on March 27, 2013.
- Hawaii Five-0—Renewed for a fourth season on March 27, 2013.
- How I Met Your Mother—Renewed for a ninth and final season on January 30, 2013.
- The Mentalist—Renewed for a sixth season on March 27, 2013.
- Mike & Molly—Renewed for a fourth season on March 27, 2013.
- NCIS—Renewed for an eleventh season on February 1, 2013.
- NCIS: Los Angeles—Renewed for a fifth season on March 27, 2013.
- Person of Interest—Renewed for a third season on March 27, 2013.
- Survivor—Renewed for a twenty-seventh season on March 27, 2013.
- Two and a Half Men—Renewed for an eleventh season on April 26, 2013.
- Undercover Boss—Renewed for a fifth season on March 27, 2013.
- Under the Dome—Renewed for a second season on July 29, 2013.
- Unforgettable— Renewed for a third season for Summer 2014.

==== The CW ====
- America's Next Top Model—Renewed for a twentieth season on October 16, 2012.
- Arrow—Renewed for a second season on February 11, 2013.
- Beauty & the Beast—Renewed for a second season on April 26, 2013.
- The Carrie Diaries—Renewed for a second season on May 9, 2013.
- Hart of Dixie—Renewed for a third season on April 26, 2013.
- Nikita—Renewed for a fourth season on May 9, 2013.
- Supernatural—Renewed for a ninth season on February 11, 2013.
- The Vampire Diaries—Renewed for a fifth season on February 11, 2013.
- Whose Line Is It Anyway?—Renewed for a tenth season on July 29, 2013.

==== Fox ====
- American Dad!—Renewed for its ninth season on May 10, 2012.
- Bob's Burgers—Renewed for a fourth season on October 16, 2012.
- Bones—Renewed for a ninth season on January 8, 2013.
- Family Guy—Renewed for a twelfth season on May 10, 2012.
- The Following—Renewed for a second season on March 4, 2013.
- Glee—Renewed for a fifth season on April 19, 2013.
- The Mindy Project—Renewed for a second season on March 4, 2013.
- New Girl—Renewed for a third season on March 4, 2013.
- Raising Hope—Renewed for a fourth season on March 4, 2013.
- The Simpsons—Renewed for its twenty-fifth season on October 7, 2011.
- The X Factor—Renewed for a third season on October 22, 2012.

==== NBC ====
- The Apprentice—Renewed for a fourteenth season on May 12, 2013.
- The Biggest Loser—Renewed for a fifteenth season on May 12, 2013.
- Chicago Fire—Renewed for a second season on April 26, 2013.
- Community—Renewed for a fifth season on May 10, 2013.
- Football Night in America—Renewed for an eighth season on August 19, 2009.
- Grimm—Renewed for a third season on April 26, 2013.
- Hannibal—Renewed for a second season on May 30, 2013.
- Hollywood Game Night—Renewed for a 10 episode second season on August 20, 2013.
- Last Comic Standing—Previously canceled, NBC renewed the series for an eighth season on November 13, 2013.
- Law & Order: Special Victims Unit—Renewed for a fifteenth season on April 26, 2013.
- NBC Sunday Night Football—Renewed for an eighth season on August 19, 2009.
- Parenthood—Renewed for a fifth season on April 26, 2013.
- Parks and Recreation—Renewed for a sixth season on May 9, 2013.
- Revolution—Renewed for a second season on April 26, 2013.
- The Sing-Off—Previously canceled, NBC renewed the series for a fourth season on March 14, 2013.
- The Voice—Renewed for a fifth and sixth season on September 25, 2012.

=== Cancellations/Series endings ===
==== ABC ====
- 666 Park Avenue—Canceled on November 16, 2012. The final episode aired on July 13, 2013.
- Body of Proof—Canceled on May 10, 2013.
- Don't Trust the B— in Apartment 23—Canceled on January 22, 2013.
- Family Tools—Canceled on May 10, 2013.
- Happy Endings—Canceled on May 10, 2013.
- How to Live with Your Parents (For the Rest of Your Life)—Canceled on May 10, 2013.
- Last Resort—Canceled on November 16, 2012. The final episode aired on January 24, 2013.
- Malibu Country—Canceled on May 10, 2013.
- Private Practice—It was announced on October 19, 2012, that season six would be the final season. The series concluded on January 22, 2013.
- Red Widow—Canceled on May 10, 2013.
- Zero Hour—Canceled on March 1, 2013, due to low ratings after three episodes. The final episode aired on August 3, 2013.

==== CBS ====
- CSI: NY—Canceled on May 10, 2013, after nine seasons.
- Friend Me—Confirmed as canceled on July 29, 2013.
- Golden Boy—Canceled on May 10, 2013.
- The Job—Canceled on February 18, 2013, due to low ratings after two episodes. It is unclear if the remaining episodes will air.
- Made in Jersey—Canceled on October 10, 2012, due to low ratings after two episodes. As of December 29, 2012, eight episodes have aired. This was the first cancellation of the season.
- Partners—Canceled on November 16, 2012, due to low ratings after six episodes.
- Rules of Engagement—Canceled on May 10, 2013, after seven seasons.
- Vegas—Canceled on May 10, 2013.

==== The CW ====
- 90210—It was announced on February 28, 2013, that season five would be the final season. The series concluded on May 13, 2013.
- Cult—Canceled on April 10, 2013. The series concluded on July 12, 2013.
- Emily Owens, M.D.—Canceled on November 28, 2012. The series concluded on February 5, 2013.
- Gossip Girl—It was announced on May 11, 2012, that season six would be the final season. The series concluded on December 17, 2012.

==== Fox ====
- Ben and Kate—Canceled on January 23, 2013. Two days after being pulled from the schedule, production was shut down after 16 episodes of a 19 episode order were filmed.
- The Cleveland Show—Canceled on April 17, 2013, after four seasons. The series concluded on May 19, 2013.
- COPS—It was announced on May 6, 2013, that the series would move to Spike for season twenty-six.
- Fringe—It was announced on April 26, 2012, that season five would be the final season. The series concluded on January 18, 2013.
- The Goodwin Games–Canceled on July 2, 2013.
- The Mob Doctor—Canceled on November 28, 2012. The series concluded on January 7, 2013.
- Touch—Canceled on May 9, 2013, after two seasons.

==== Ion Television ====
- Flashpoint—It was announced on May 1, 2012, that season five would be the final season. The series concluded on January 22, 2013.

==== NBC ====
- 1600 Penn—Canceled on May 9, 2013.
- 30 Rock—It was announced on May 14, 2012, that season seven would be the final season. The series concluded on January 31, 2013.
- Animal Practice—Canceled on October 18, 2012, due to low ratings after five episodes.
- Betty White's Off Their Rockers—Canceled on July 11, 2013, after two seasons. It was announced on October 18, 2013, that the series would move to Lifetime.
- Camp—Cancelled on October 1, 2013, after one season.
- Deception—Canceled on May 8, 2013.
- Do No Harm—Canceled on February 8, 2013, due to low ratings after two episodes.
- Fashion Star—Canceled on July 27, 2013.
- Go On—Canceled on May 10, 2013.
- Guys with Kids—Canceled on May 9, 2013.
- The New Normal—Canceled on May 10, 2013.
- Next Caller—It was announced on October 12, 2012, that the series would not air.
- The Office—It was announced on August 21, 2012, that season nine would be the final season. The series concluded on May 16, 2013.
- Ready for Love—Canceled on April 19, 2013, due to low ratings after two episodes. The last episode aired on April 23, 2013.
- Rock Center with Brian Williams—Canceled on May 10, 2013.
- Smash—Canceled on May 10, 2013.
- Up All Night—Canceled on May 9, 2013, after two seasons.
- Whitney—Canceled on May 9, 2013, after two seasons.

== See also ==
- 2012–13 United States network television schedule (daytime)
- 2012–13 United States network television schedule (late night)

== Top weekly ratings ==
- Data sources: AC Nielsen, TV by the Numbers

=== Total Viewers ===
Week	Name	Viewers (in millions)	Network
August 27-September 2	America's Got Talent 8/28	9.89	NBC
September 3-September 9	Sunday Night Football: Pittsburgh Steelers at Denver Broncos	27.57	NBC
September 10-September 16	Sunday Night Football: Detroit Lions at San Francisco 49ers	21.33	NBC
September 17-September 23	Sunday Night Football: New England Patriots at Baltimore Ravens	21.27	NBC
September 24-September 30	Sunday Night Football: New York Giants at Philadelphia Eagles	22.77	NBC
October 1-October 7	NCIS	18.87	CBS
October 8-October 14	Sunday Night Football: Green Bay Packers at Houston Texans	19.92	NBC
October 15-October 21	Sunday Night Football: Pittsburgh Steelers at Cincinnati Bengals	17.47	NBC
October 22-October 28	NCIS	17.8	CBS
October 29-November 4	Sunday Night Football: Dallas Cowboys at Atlanta Falcons	21.76	NBC
November 5-November 11	Sunday Night Football: Houston Texans at Chicago Bears	20.86	NBC
November 12-November 18	Sunday Night Football: Baltimore Ravens at Pittsburgh Steelers	18.16	NBC
November 19-November 25	Sunday Night Football: Green Bay Packers at New York Giants	20.85	NBC
November 26-December 2	Sunday Night Football: Philadelphia Eagles at Dallas Cowboys	20.42	NBC
December 3-December 9	Sunday Night Football: Green Bay Packers at Detroit Lions	21.36	NBC
December 10-December 16	Sunday Night Football: San Francisco 49ers at New England Patriots	23.23	NBC
December 17-December 23	NCIS	19.59	CBS
December 24-December 30	Sunday Night Football: Dallas Cowboys at Washington Redskins	30.30	NBC
December 31-January 6	NFC Wild Card Playoff: Minnesota Vikings at Green Bay Packers	30.28	NBC
January 7-January 13	NFC Divisional Playoff: Green Bay Packers at San Francisco 49ers	30.89	FOX
January 14-January 20	AFC Championship Game: New England Patriots at Baltimore Ravens	47.71	CBS
January 21-January 27	American Idol 1/23	16.07	FOX
January 28-February 3	Super Bowl XLVII: Baltimore Ravens vs. San Francisco 49ers	108.69	CBS
February 4-February 10	55th Grammy Awards	28.38	CBS
February 11-February 17	The Big Bang Theory	17.89	CBS
February 18-February 24	85th Academy Awards	40.38	ABC
February 25-March 3	NCIS	20.69	CBS
March 4-March 10	NCIS	20.81	CBS
March 11-March 17	The Big Bang Theory	15.90	CBS
March 18-March 24	NCIS	19.79	CBS
March 25-March 31	NCIS	18.62	CBS
April 1-April 7	The Big Bang Theory	17.24	CBS
April 8-April 14	2013 Final Four National Championship: Michigan vs. Louisville	23.43	CBS
April 15-April 21	The Voice 4/15	14.45	NBC
April 22-April 28	NCIS	17.33	CBS
April 29-May 5	NCIS	18.29	CBS
May 6-May 12	NCIS	17.56	CBS
May 13-May 19	NCIS	18.79	CBS
May 20-May 26	Dancing with the Stars 5/21	15.20	ABC
May 27-June 2	The Voice 5/27	11.00	NBC
June 3-June 9	2013 NBA Finals Game 2: San Antonio Spurs at Miami Heat	14.57	ABC
June 10-June 16	2013 NBA Finals Game 5: Miami Heat at San Antonio Spurs	16.27	ABC
June 17-June 23	2013 NBA Finals Game 7: San Antonio Spurs at Miami Heat	26.32	ABC
June 24-June 30	Under the Dome	13.53	CBS
July 1-July 7	Under the Dome	11.82	CBS
July 8-July 14	Under the Dome	10.71	CBS
July 15-July 21	America's Got Talent 7/17	11.18	NBC
July 22-July 28	Under the Dome	11.60	CBS
July 29-August 4	Under the Dome	11.41	CBS
August 5-August 11	Under the Dome	10.42	CBS
August 12-August 18	Under the Dome	10.36	CBS

=== 18-49 Viewers ===
Week	Name	Viewers (in millions)	Network
August 27-September 2	Saturday Night Football: Michigan vs. Alabama	3.0	ABC
September 3-September 9	Sunday Night Football: Pittsburgh Steelers at Denver Broncos	11.0	NBC
September 10-September 16	Sunday Night Football: Detroit Lions at San Francisco 49ers	8.9	NBC
September 17-September 23	Sunday Night Football: New England Patriots at Baltimore Ravens	8.7	NBC
September 24-September 30	Sunday Night Football: New York Giants at Philadelphia Eagles	9.0	NBC
October 1-October 7	Sunday Night Football: San Diego Chargers at New Orleans Saints	7.2	NBC
October 8-October 14	Sunday Night Football: Green Bay Packers at Houston Texans	7.7	NBC
October 15-October 21	Sunday Night Football: Pittsburgh Steelers at Cincinnati Bengals	6.7	NBC
October 22-October 28	Sunday Night Football: New Orleans Saints at Denver Broncos	7.0	NBC
October 29-November 4	Sunday Night Football: Dallas Cowboys at Atlanta Falcons	8.5	NBC
November 5-November 11	Sunday Night Football: Houston Texans at Chicago Bears	7.9	NBC
November 12-November 18	Sunday Night Football: Baltimore Ravens at Pittsburgh Steelers	6.9	NBC
November 19-November 25	Sunday Night Football: Green Bay Packers at New York Giants	7.6	NBC
November 26-December 2	Sunday Night Football: Philadelphia Eagles at Dallas Cowboys	7.4	NBC
December 3-December 9	Sunday Night Football: Green Bay Packers at Detroit Lions	7.8	NBC
December 10-December 16	Sunday Night Football: San Francisco 49ers at New England Patriots	8.7	NBC
December 17-December 23	Sunday Night Football: San Francisco 49ers at Seattle Seahawks	6.7	NBC
December 24-December 30	Sunday Night Football: Dallas Cowboys at Washington Redskins	10.5	NBC
December 31-January 6	NFC Wild Card Playoff: Minnesota Vikings at Green Bay Packers	10.5	NBC
January 7-January 13	NFC Divisional Playoff: Green Bay Packers at San Francisco 49ers	11.1	FOX
January 14-January 20	AFC Championship Game: New England Patriots at Baltimore Ravens	16.8	CBS
January 21-January 27	American Idol 1/23	5.5	FOX
January 28-February 3	Super Bowl XLVII: Baltimore Ravens vs. San Francisco 49ers	39.7	CBS
February 4-February 10	55th Grammy Awards	10.1	CBS
February 11-February 17	The Big Bang Theory	5.5	CBS
February 18-February 24	85th Academy Awards	13.0	ABC
February 25-March 3	Modern Family	3.9	ABC
March 4-March 10	The Big Bang Theory	5.5	CBS
March 11-March 17	The Big Bang Theory	4.8	CBS
March 18-March 24	American Idol 3/20	3.6	FOX
March 25-March 31	The Voice 3/25	4.8	NBC
April 1-April 7	2013 Final Four National Semifinal: Syracuse vs. Michigan	5.7	CBS
April 8-April 14	2013 Final Four National Championship: Michigan vs. Louisville	8.4	CBS
April 15-April 21	The Voice 4/15	5.2	NBC
April 22-April 28	The Voice 4/22	4.9	NBC
April 29-May 5	The Big Bang Theory	4.9	CBS
May 6-May 12	The Big Bang Theory	4.9	CBS
May 13-May 19	The Big Bang Theory	4.8	CBS
May 20-May 26	Modern Family	3.7	ABC
May 27-June 2	The Voice 5/27	3.2	NBC
June 3-June 9	2013 NBA Finals Game 2: San Antonio Spurs at Miami Heat	5.8	ABC
June 10-June 16	2013 NBA Finals Game 4: Miami Heat at San Antonio Spurs	6.7	ABC
June 17-June 23	2013 NBA Finals Game 7: San Antonio Spurs at Miami Heat	10.6	ABC
June 24-June 30	Under the Dome	3.3	CBS
July 1-July 7	Under the Dome	2.9	CBS
July 8-July 14	America's Got Talent 7/10	2.8	NBC
July 15-July 21	2013 Major League Baseball All-Star Game	3.2	FOX
July 22-July 28	America's Got Talent 7/23	2.8	NBC
July 29-August 4	2013 Pro Football Hall of Fame Game: Miami Dolphins vs. Dallas Cowboys	3.8	NBC
August 5-August 11	The Bachelorette	2.6	ABC
August 12-August 18	America's Got Talent 8/13	2.4	NBC
