= Celeste Thorson =

American actress and model

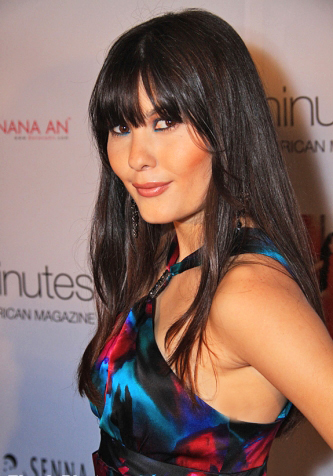
- Thorson at the red carpet event in Hollywood, California
- Born: July 23, 1984 (age 42); Orange County, California, U.S.
- Occupations: Actress, model, screenwriter, activist
- Website: http://www.celestethorson.com

Celeste Thorson (born July 23, 1984) is an American actress, model, screenwriter, and activist. She is best known for her roles on How I Met Your Mother, Jimmy Kimmel Live!, The Exes, Heartbeat and as a host for numerous lifestyle and travel television shows. Thorson has written twenty four episodes of television and several short films. As a model, she has been featured in modeling and commercial campaigns for Reebok, Lady Foot Locker, Yoplait, Sprint, Nissan, Nokia, Samsung, Yahoo!, Body Glove, Toms Shoes, and Paul Mitchell.

== Early life ==
Thorson was born in Orange County, California, to her mother a fine artist, and father a United States Marine; the two divorced during Thorson's childhood.

Thorson traveled much of the southwestern United States during grade school and high school, attending a number of private and public schools. Her residence changed often as her family would acquire commercial and residential real estate stretching from Los Angeles and Southern California to New Mexico and Texas. After graduating early from high school, Thorson moved to San Miguel de Allende, Guanajuato, Mexico to continue the three-generation family tradition of attending the historic Instituto Allende. Thorson studied classical art, silver working, jewelry making, sculpture and bronze casting at the privately owned institute, which was founded in 1950.

== Career ==
At the age of 17, Thorson returned to the United States and moved to Los Angeles, California, to pursue political activism. As one of the youngest members in her office, Thorson quickly rose to the position of the Top Fundraiser in the Nation for the Public Interest Research Group. As a political activist she has worked to support many non-profit organizations such as Children International, Save the Children, Human Rights Campaign, Public Interest Research Group, and Sierra Club. She has committed her career to raising awareness and support for charitable causes around the world.

== Modeling ==
At the age of 19, Celeste Thorson was discovered and signed by the Cuttingham Escott Slevin Doughty CESD Talent Agency in Los Angeles as a commercial and actress and model. She modeled in global markets such as: Los Angeles, New York City, Milan, Paris, Cannes, Japan, London, the Netherlands, Thailand, and Korea. Thorson has been the cover girl for numerous magazines around the world and Billboards spanning the United States, Latin America and Asia. She has appeared in many modeling campaigns for clients like Body Glove, Nokia, Yahoo!, Fred Segal, Markwins, BIOQUE, Pinar Eris, Seril, Core Clothing, Jerry Terrence, Anna D. Milano, Eduardo Lucero, Louis Verdad, Margie Kent, Alisse Thatcher, Maggie Barry, D'Voshion, ISSI Fashion Beverly Hills, Qimone, Toms Shoes and Paul Mitchell. Throughout her modeling career she has worked with celebrity photographers, Giuliano Bekor, Lionel Deluy, David Lee (photographer), Nikola Borrisov, Sean Armenta, Leea Haeger, Patricia de La Rosa, Kim Grisco, Amir Magal, Nicolaas De Bruin, Rachel Stephens, Shane Sato, Garet Field Sells, Tom Concordia, Scott Nathan, Steven Kay, Andrew Paynter, Brooks Ayola, Suzette Troche, Akif Hakan Celebi, Larissa Underwood, and one of Tyra Banks favorite America's Next Top Model photographer Matthew Jordan Smith.

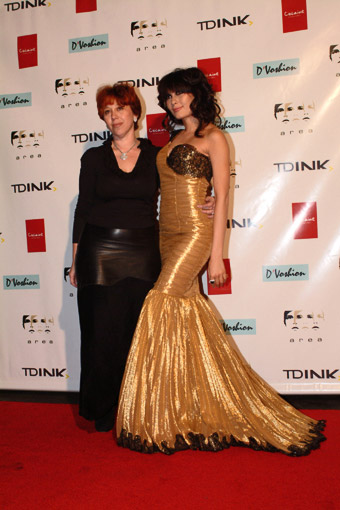
Celeste Thorson on Red Carpet for D'Voshion Fashion show in West Hollywood, California

== Film and television ==
Thorson's first television appearances were for two consecutive Sprint commercials directed by Brian Beletic. She joined the Screen Actors Guild as a professional actress and appeared in commercial ads for clients like Lady Foot Locker, Reebok (director Shaun Conrad), Samsung, and Nissan (Believe Media). She also gave a cameo appearance in the Rolling Stones music video, Rain Fall Down, directed by Jonas Akerlund.

She was cast as an athletic, action sports star on the adventure TV series Destination X: Hawaii season one and Destination X: California season two. Destination X airs on Direct TV, Dish Network, Comcast and Time Warner Cable on The Resorts & Residence Channel and MavTV. It has broadcast on the Water Channel, MTV2 and in over 66 countries around the world.

The first season was filmed on the Hawaiian Islands of Oahu, Kauai, and Hawaii where Thorson hosted and participated in various outdoor sports like sky diving, mountain biking, jet skiing, scuba diving, parasailing, swimming with sharks, and rappelling off mountains. Season two was shot throughout Southern California, Mexicali, and Nevada where Thorson did races and did photos shoots with exotic sports cars like the Lotus Elise, Formula One, Bugatti Veyron, Porsche GTI, Bentley and many others. Destination X California also featured the Willow Springs race track, as well as drifting and racing rallies like the Gumball and Bullrun. With the help of stunt pilots Thorson also did aerobatic maneuvers in the L-39 Albatros fighter jet.

During her film career she starred in Room Nine a short film about a deadly girl on the run in the desert, directed by Paul Street of Streetlight Films UK and Believe Media. "Room Nine" was filmed in the Salton Sea, California and featured Thorson exploding a pickup truck. The film screened at the ArcLight Hollywood Cinema in Hollywood, California at the Hollywood Film Festival., the Palm Beach International Film Festival in Florida and at the New York Picture Start Film Festival where Thorson was nominated for Best Actress.

Theatrically, Thorson has performed in numerous dramatic films. She portrayed "Rocker Jill" in the feature film Satin which starred Melissa Joan Hart, Michael Cudlitz, and Robert Guillaume. Science fiction films such as director Matt Atom's Seagulls and Michael R. Chance's film alongside Tongayi Chirisa, published by The Escapist as part of New Regency Productions Prototype program.

Comedically, Thorson appeared in the "Zoo or False" episode of How I Met Your Mother alongside Emmy winning actor Neil Patrick Harris and actress Collette Wolfe. Thorson also performed in comedic television shows such as Jimmy Kimmel Live!, The Exes, and Heartbeat.

Celeste Thorson has written a total of 27 episodes of television, 8 webisodes, and 4 short films. She has produced and directed several programs.

== Filmography ==
Screenwriter
Year	Film/Television	Notes	
2006–07	Destination X:Hawaii	10 Episodes	
2008	Destination X:California	1 Episodes	
2009	The Industry	13 Episodes	
2011	Hit Girls	Lilly Campbell	Short Film
2011	Scrubbed	Mia	Short Film
2012	The Madame	Naomi	Short Film
2012	Scrubbed	Mia	Short Film
2013	Destination Luxury	1 Episode	
2014	Joie Ride	1 Episode	
2015	Alohas World	1 Episode	
2016	Vierge	Vierge	Short Film

Film Actress
Year	Film/Television	Roles	Notes
2007	Room Nine	Kaya	Short Film
2007	Still Breathing	Bartender	Short Film
2009	Jimmy Kimmel Live!	Fragrance Model	1 Episode
2010	Satin	Rocker Jill	Feature Film
2011	Hit Girls	Lilly Campbell	Short Film
2011	Scrubbed	Mia	Short Film
2012	The Madame	Naomi	Short Film
2012	Scrubbed	Mia	Short Film
2012	Startrip	Squirrel	Feature Film
2012	Night Bird	Ling	Feature Film
2013	Seagulls	Red Riding Hood	Short Film
2014	Whipping Boy	Ramona Pinsler	Short Film
2016	Vierge	Vierge	Short Film

Television Actress
Year	Series	Role	Notes
2006–07	Destination X:Hawaii	Kaya	Short Film
2008	Destination X:California	Bartender	Short Film
2009	Jimmy Kimmel Live!	Fragrance Model	1 Episode
2010	How I Met Your Mother	Lisa	"Zoo or False"
2012	The Exes	Stacey	Sister Act
2016	Heartbeat	Flight Attendant	1 Episode

== Festivals and awards ==
Celeste Thorson won the Model Star Award for Best Female representing the United States at the Asia Model Festival Awards Award Acceptance in Seoul, Korea. She traveled to South Korea to accept the award. Japan, Korea, China, the Philippines, Uzbekistan and the United States were all represented in the ceremony, with award winners like Super Junior, Iza Calzado, Park Min-young, Han Ye-seul, Ju Ji-hoon, and Celeste Thorson as the popular favorites of Asia. Thorson was nominated along with three others in her category at the Asia Model Festival Awards sponsored by the Republic of Korea's Ministry of Culture and Tourism, China Bentley Culture Development, Arirang TV China Guang Xi TV, Dong-A TV, ETN TV, and China Central Television CCTV.

Room Nine, a 35mm film directed by Paul Street, screened as an official selection of the Hollywood Film Festival at the Arclight Theater in Hollywood, California. Thorson was nominated for Best Actress at the Tenth Annual PICTURESTART FILM FESTIVAL in New York City. for her the same film Room Nine.

The Madame, a film written by Celeste Thorson directed by David Lee (photographer) was screened at Museum of Contemporary Art San Diego as an official selection of the La Jolla Fashion Film Festival. Yogaphiles, the web series written by Thorson, screened in Atlanta, Georgia as an official selection of the Urban Mediamakers Film Festival.

== Activism and advocacy ==
Celeste Thorson has been an activist for human and environmental rights for over a decade. She has promoted environmental protections, human and consumer rights through the efforts of organizations such as: Unicef, UN WomenAmnesty International, Human Rights Watch, Sierra Club, Oceana, Public Interest Research Group, Save The Children, Children International, Nature Conservancy. Celeste Thorson, notably gave a keynote speech for UN Women SoCal on International Women's Day about gender equality and women's rights, the online video reached a global large audience online.
