= Arielle Kebbel =

American actress and model (born 1985)

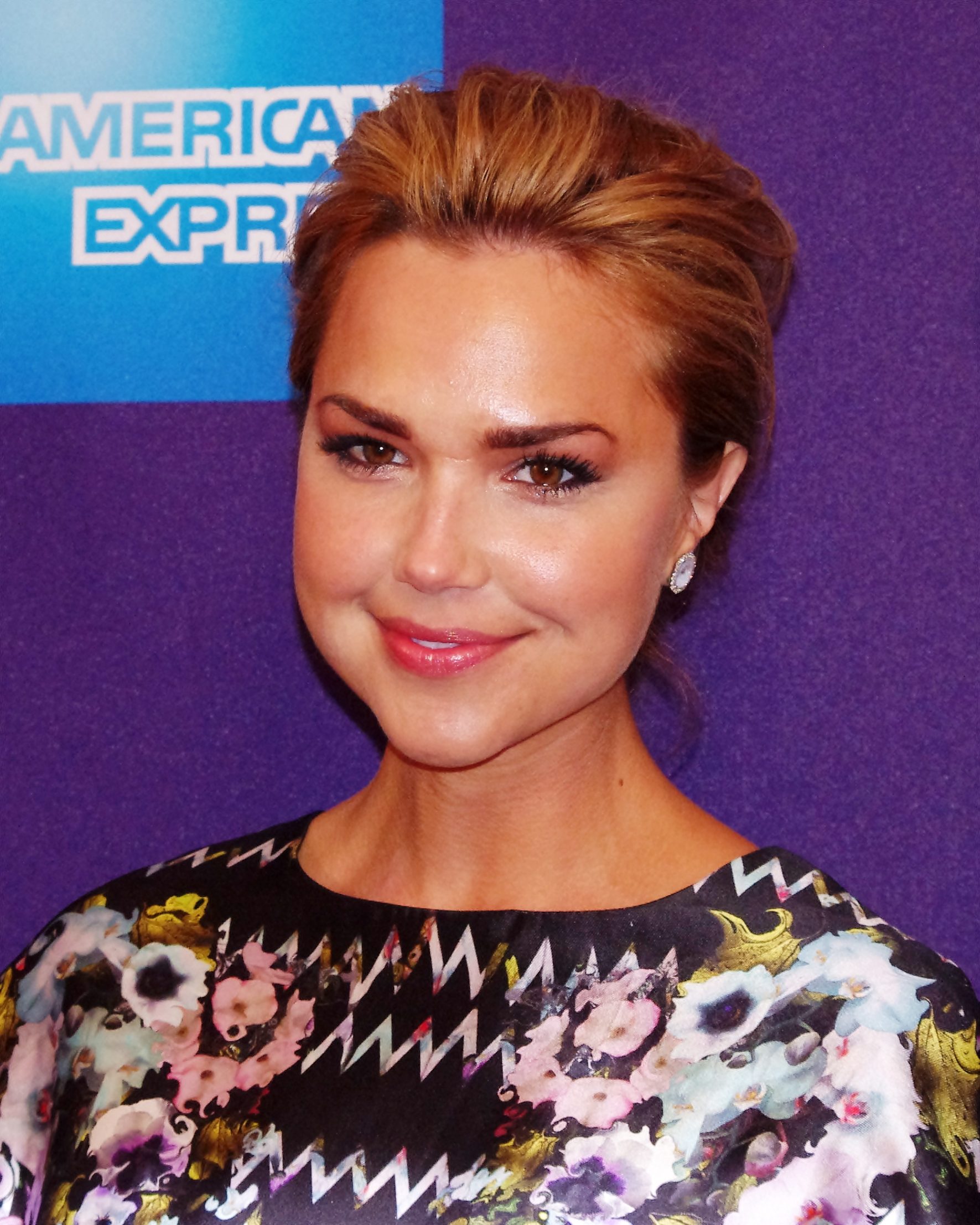
- Kebbel at the 2012 Tribeca Film Festival
- Born: February 19, 1985 (age 41); Orlando, Florida, U.S.
- Citizenship: United States
- Occupations: Actress; model
- Years active: 1999-present
- Known for: John Tucker Must Die; Aquamarine; The Grudge 2
- Height: 5 ft 8 in (173 cm)

Arielle Kebbel (born February 19, 1985 in Orlando, Florida) is an American actress and model who first gained recognition through television roles in Gilmore Girls and later The Vampire Diaries and 90210. She also became known for her roles in the films John Tucker Must Die, Aquamarine and The Grudge 2 (all in 2006). Kebbel has since worked extensively in both film and television, with film credits including Think Like a Man (2012), Fifty Shades Freed (2018) and the After film series (2021-2023). Her television work has included leading roles in Midnight, Texas, Lincoln Rhyme: Hunt for the Bone Collector, Rescue: HI-Surf and Marshals.

== Early life ==
Kebbel was raised in Winter Park, alongside her two siblings. She began taking riding lessons at the age of five and eventually owned a pony. She trained in competitive equestrian sports for seven years and also performed with horses in arena shows. Kebbel has credited her experience in equestrian sports with instilling a strong sense of discipline and dedication, saying: "I've always been non-stop, driven and veracious, but riding taught me discipline and to put my head down and do the work. If I wasn’t in school, I was at the barn." Kebbel graduated from Crenshaw School in Winter Garden. She was actively involved in several sports and extracurricular activities, including cheerleading, track and field, competitive dance and volleyball.

== Career ==
=== 1999-2005: Career beginnings and early roles ===
In 1999, at age 14, Kebbel was hired as an extra for Creed's music video "Higher." She was the first runner-up at the 2002 Miss Florida Teen USA beauty pageant. She began taking acting classes at age 16 and was trained at the Lisa Maile Image, Modeling & Acting School. In 2003, her first television acting credit was in the CSI: Crime Scene Investigation season three episode "Forever." She later recalled in an interview with TVLine: "I remember the day that I was filming, my friends were back in Florida, going to prom. I remember thinking, 'This is the path I chose. I'm doing what I want to get to do my way and they're getting to do what they want to do their way. My high school prom was on set at CSI!" She auditioned for films Freaky Friday (2003) and Mean Girls (2004), but did not get either part (Lindsay Lohan did). Instead, she secured a management team and an agent in Los Angeles. In January 2003, she relocated to Los Angeles and, during her first week there, successfully auditioned for the role of Lindsay Lister on The CW comedy drama series Gilmore Girls. She went on to play a recurring role throughout the third, fourth and fifth seasons. During this period, she also worked as a waitress and nanny. Later, she made guest appearances on Law & Order: Special Victims Unit and Judging Amy.

Kebbel at 2006 Comic-Con

Kebbel made her film debut as Heather Hunkee in the comedy film Soul Plane (2004) and portrayed Taya in five episodes of the Fox sitcom Grounded for Life. Kebbel played Layla in the pilot episode of the HBO series Entourage. She landed her first magazine cover for Vegas magazine in October 2004. She has since appeared in features and covers for other prominent lifestyle and fashion publications, including Men's Health, Nylon, Maxim, H and Lucky. In 2005, she appeared in five films: American Pie Presents: Band Camp, The Kid & I, Dirty Deeds, Reeker and Be Cool.

=== 2006-2016: Breakthrough and wider recognition ===
In 2006, Kebbel appeared in several successful films, the first of which was a role as Carrie Schaeffer in 20th Century Fox's teen comedy film John Tucker Must Die. The film, which also starred Ashanti, Sophia Bush and Brittany Snow, revolves around three girls (Heather Montgomery, Beth McIntyre and Carrie Schaeffer) who seek revenge on their mutual ex-boyfriend (Jesse Metcalfe) for cheating by enlisting Kate Spencer to help, was a box office success, grossing $68.8 million worldwide against an $18 million budget. Her second successful film of 2006 saw her play the main villain Cecilia Banks in 20 Century Fox's teen fantasy romantic comedy Aquamarine. The film, which also starred Sara Paxton, Emma Roberts and JoJo (in her film debut), not only grossed $23 million at the worldwide box office against a $12 million budget, but has since become a cult film. Her third and most successful film of 2006 saw her play Allison Fleming, an exchange student from Chicago who attended Tokyo International School in the horror film The Grudge 2. Kebbel was nominated for Teen Choice Award for Choice Movie: Scream for the role. The film, which also starred Sarah Michelle Gellar, Teresa Palmer and Amber Tamblyn, received negative reviews from critics but was a box office success and grossed $70.7 million worldwide against a $20 million budget.

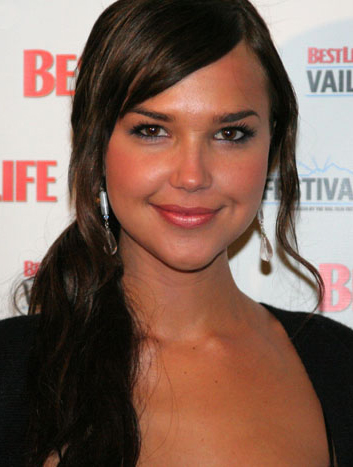
Kebbel at the 2007 Vail Film Festival promoting Daydreamer

In 2008, she landed a main role as Katherine in the British horror film Freakdog. The film received a limited cinema release and reviews of the film were generally poor. In late 2008, she began filming the psychological horror film The Unvited (2009) in Vancouver, British Columbia. She portrayed Alex, a grieving teenager trying to prove her late mother's nurse can't be trusted. In 2009, she made her first appearance as Alexia Branson in The CW supernatural teen drama series The Vampire Diaries, a role that lasted for nine episodes. In 2010, she appeared in the vampire parody film Vampires Suck, which mainly parodies The Twilight Saga franchise. The film opened at #1 in the United States on August 18 and grossed $81.4 million worldwide. She had a main role on the second season of The CW's drama series Life Unexpected and guest starred as Charlene on True Blood. When Kebbel began portraying Vanessa on 90210, TVLine described her as the network's "poster child," noting that she had appeared in numerous shows on the network.

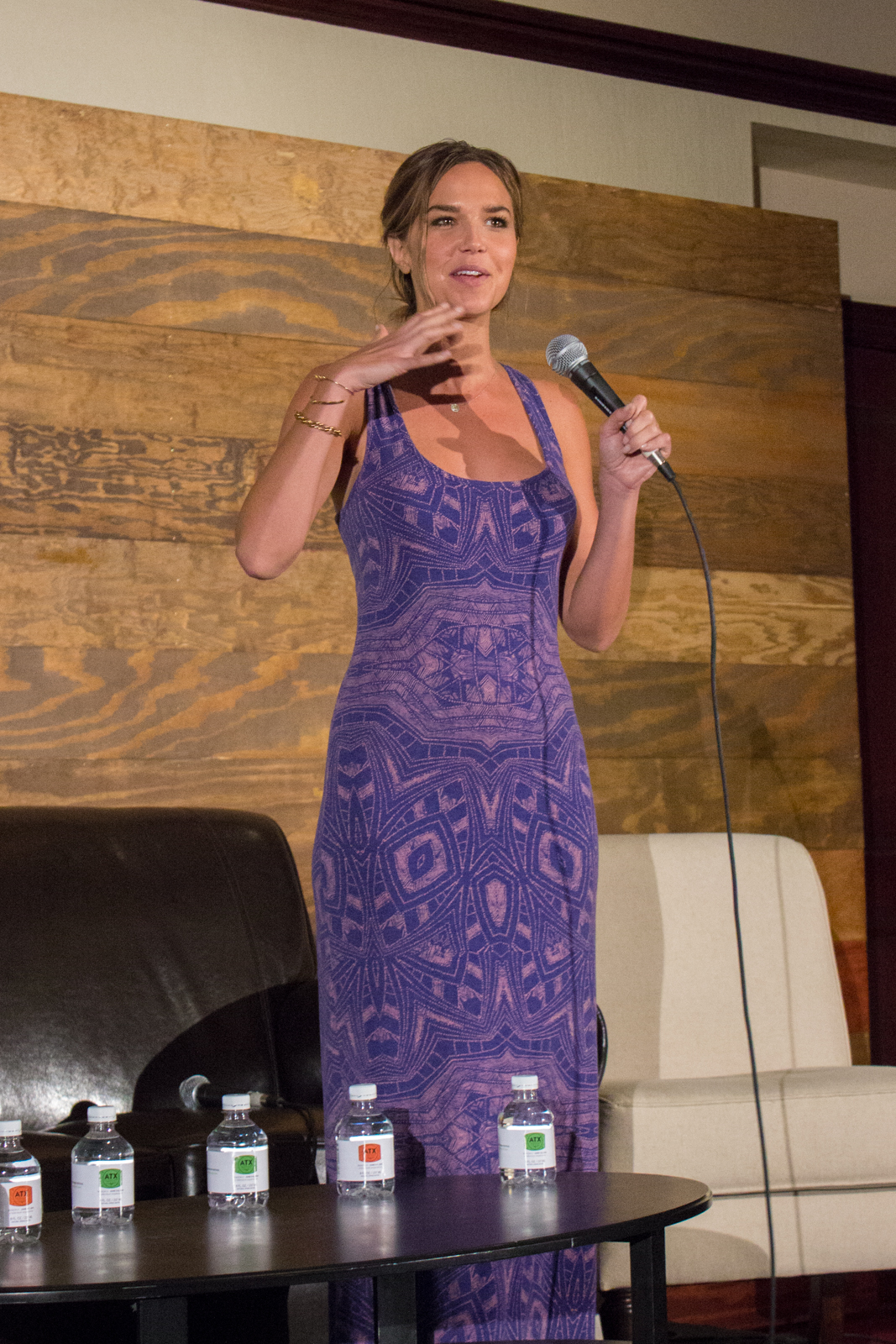
Kebbel at the 2014 ATX Television Festival for Sullivan & Son

She also had roles in arthouse and independent films, including 2011's I Melt with You and The Brooklyn Brothers Beat the Best. She had a small role as Gina in the romantic comedy film Think Like a Man (2012) and guest starred on Hawaii Five-0 in the episode "Popilikia." In 2013, Kebbel starred in The Vampire Diaries: Rehash and Perfect Score as the host of both shows. In 2015, she had recurring roles on Unreal, The League and Ballers, the latter of which she was added to the main cast for the second season as Tracy Leggete, a sportscaster involved with the show's main character Spencer Strasmore (Dwayne Johnson).

=== 2017-present: Action roles and television prominence ===
In 2017, Kebbel starred as freelance assassin Olivia Charity in the NBC drama series Midnight, Texas for two seasons. She had main roles in the Hallmark Channel television films Four Christmases and a Wedding (2017) and A Brush with Love (2019). She portrayed architect Gia Matteo in Fifty Shades Freed (2018), the third and final installment in the Fifty Shades film series. The film, which also starred Dakota Johnson and Jamie Dornan, was a box office success, grossing $372 million worldwide against a $55 million production budget.

From 2020 onwards, Kebbel shifted her focus to action-oriented television roles, starting with a main role on the NBC crime drama series Lincoln Rhyme: Hunt for the Bone Collector as intuitive rookie NYPD officer Amelia Sachs. While popular as a mid-season replacement show, NBC made the decision in June 2020 to cancel the series after one season, with the series finale airing in March. She starred as Jessie Temple in the Christmas film A Holiday Hideout (2021), for which she won Best Actress award at Holiday Music and Film Awards. She played Kimberly in three adaptions of the After film series: 2021's After We Fell, 2022's After Ever Happy and 2023's After Everything. In 2022, her next role was a recurring one as firefighter Lucy Donato in the procedural drama series 9-1-1. In 2024, Kebbel was cast as lifeguard lieutenant, Emily "Em" Wright in the Fox action drama series Rescue: HI-Surf. The show premiered on September 22, but was canceled after one season in May 2025.

In 2026, Kebbel starred as Hilary Timmons in the biographical drama film I Can Only Imagine 2, based on the life story of singer Bart Millard. Kebbel was cast as Belle Skinner in the CBS neo-Western and police procedural television series Marshals, which premiered on March 1. The series serves as both a spin-off and sequel to Yellowstone (2018-2024) and is the fourth television series in the Yellowstone franchise. The show's premiere broke records as the most-streamed CBS episode on Paramount+ with over 20 million views. The series was soon renewed for a second season, which premiered on October 4.

== Personal life ==
Kebbel has a lifelong love of horses. She also spends time advocating against the brutal round-ups of feral horses, many of whom are sold for slaughter. She serves as a board member for horse rescue organization, Skydog Sanctuary. On April 14, 2025, she announced her relationship with American actor and The Vampire Diaries co-star Zach Roerig. They ended their relationship in February 2026 after just ten months of dating.

== Filmography ==
Key
†	Denotes films that have not yet been released

=== Film ===
Year	Title	Role	Notes
2004	Soul Plane	Heather Hunkee	
2005	The Kid & I	Arielle	
2005	American Pie Presents: Band Camp	Elyse Houston	
2005	Dirty Deeds	Alison	
2005	Reeker	Cookie	
2005	Be Cool	Robin	
2006	Outlaw Trail: The Treasure of Butch Cassidy	Ellie	
2006	The Grudge 2	Allison Fleming	
2006	John Tucker Must Die	Carrie Schaeffer	
2006	Aquamarine	Cecilia Banks	
2006	The Bros.	Kim	
2007	Daydreamer	Casey Green	
2008	Forever Strong	Emily	
2008	Freakdog	Catherine Thomas	
2009	The Uninvited	Alex Ivers	
2010	Vampires Suck	Rachel	
2010	Answer This!	Naomi	
2011	I Melt with You	Randi	
2011	The Brooklyn Brothers Beat the Best	Cassidy	
2011	Mardi Gras: Spring Break	Lucy	
2012	Supporting Characters	Jamie	
2012	Think Like a Man	Gina	
2017	Bitch	Miss Cohen	
2018	Fifty Shades Freed	Gia Matteo	
2018	Another Time	Ally	
2021	Some Dogs Go to Heaven	Narrator	Short film
2021	After We Fell	Kimberly	
2022	After Ever Happy	Kimberly	
2023	After Everything	Kimberly	
2024	Summer Camp	Frankie	
2025	Site	Elena Bardo	
2025	Blue Zeus	Herself	Documentary film
2026	I Can Only Imagine 2	Hilary Timmons	

=== Television ===
Year	Title	Role	Notes
2003	CSI: Crime Scene Investigation	Right Teen	"Forever" (season 3, episode 21)
2003	Judging Amy	Paige Lange	"The Long Goodbye" (season 5, episode 8)
2003	Law & Order: Special Victims Unit	Andrea Kent	"Mean" (season 5, episode 17)
2003-2004	Gilmore Girls	Lindsay Anne Lister Forester	9 episodes
2004	Entourage	Layla	"Pilot" (season 1, episode 1)
2004	Grounded for Life	Taya	5 episodes
2005	CSI: Miami	Pam Carpenter	"Nothing to Lose" (season 3, episode 16)
2005	Clubhouse	Kat	"Road Trip" (season 1, episode 6)
2006	Shark	Sydney Blair	"In the Grasp" (season 1, episode 5)
2007	Football Wives	Nicole Holt	Pilot (not picked up)
2009	No Heroics	Sandy	Pilot (not picked up)
2009-2014, 2017	The Vampire Diaries	Alexia "Lexi" Branson	9 episodes
2010	True Blood	Charlene	"I Smell a Rat" (season 3, episode 10)
2010	Life Unexpected	Paige	Main role (season 2); 7 episodes
2010	Brooklyn to Manhattan	Chloe	TV film
2011	Marcy	Arielle	"Marcy Does a Photographer" (season 1, episode 6)
2011	Good Vibes	Payton (voice)	"Backstage Babs" (season 1, episode 12)
2011	Hallelujah	Veda Roman	Movie
2011-2013	90210	Vanessa Shaw	15 episodes
2012	A Bride for Christmas	Jessie Patterston	Hallmark movie
2012	Hawaii Five-0	Nicole Carr	"Popilikia" (season 3, episode 4)
2012	Audrey	Marissa	4 episodes
2013	Perfect Score	Herself/Host	Game show
2013	Instant Mom	Stephanie's Friend	2 episodes
2014	Sweet Surrender	Nancy	Hallmark TV film
2014	The After	Tammy	Web series pilot
2015	Bridal Wave	Georgie Dwyer	Hallmark TV film
2015	Unreal	Britney	3 episodes
2015	The League	Libby	3 episodes
2015-2016, 2019	Ballers	Tracy Legette	16 episodes; Recurring role (seasons 1, 5); Main role (season 2)
2015-2016	The Grinder	Avery Banks/Gabrielle	2 episodes
2015-2019	Robot Chicken	Various roles	Voice; 3 episodes
2017	Four Christmases and a Wedding	Chloe	Lifetime TV film
2017–2018	Midnight, Texas	Olivia Charity	Main role; 19 episodes
2019	A Brush With Love	Jamie	Hallmark TV film
2019	Grand Hotel	Skye	Recurring role; 4 episodes
2020	Lincoln Rhyme: Hunt for the Bone Collector	Amelia Sachs	Main role; 10 episodes
2022-2023	9-1-1	Lucy Donato	Recurring role; 10 episodes
2023	Love in the Great Smoky Mountains: A National Park Romance	Haley James	Also co-producer; Hallmark TV film
2024-2025	Rescue: HI-Surf	Emily "Em" Wright	Main role; 19 episodes
2025	Thank God: Christmas at Keller Ranch	Maggie Keller	Lifetime television film
2025	Love Is a Dog's Best Friend	Lily Garner	Also executive producer; TV film
2026-present	Marshals	Belle Skinner	Main role; 13 episodes

=== Music videos ===
Year	Title	Artist(s)	Role	Ref.
1999	"Higher"	Creed	Extra	
2008	"Don't Go Away"	Buckcherry	Girlfriend	

== Awards and nominations ==
Year	Association	Category	Work	Result
2007	Teen Choice Awards	Choice Movie: Scream	The Grudge 2	Nominated
2024	Holiday Music and Film Awards	Best Christmas Cosy Caper	A Christmas Witness	Won
2026	Astra TV Awards	Best Broadcast Network Drama Ensemble	Marshals	Nominated
