= Next Caller (TV series) =

American television comedy series

- Genre: Television comedy
- Created by: Stephen Falk
- Starring: Dane Cook; Collette Wolfe; Jeffrey Tambor; Joy Osmanski; Desmin Borges
- Country of origin: United States
- Original language: English
- No. of seasons: 1
- No. of episodes: 4 (never aired)

Production
- Executive producer: Stephen Falk
- Camera setup: Single camera
- Running time: 22 minutes
- Production companies: A Woof Filmed Entertainment Lionsgate Television; Universal Television

Next Caller is an unaired American television comedy series that was scheduled to premiere mid-season on NBC as part of the 2012–13 television schedule. The network placed a series order in May 2012. Season one was set to feature seven half-hour episodes.

On October 12, 2012, NBC announced the cancellation of the series after only four episodes had been filmed, citing creative differences with star Dane Cook, and that the filmed episodes would not be aired. It became the second series of the 2012–13 television season to be canceled, after Made in Jersey.

== Premise ==
A very unlikely pair of satellite radio disc jockeys are forced to share the microphone for a relationship call-in show in New York City. Cam (Dane Cook) is crude, egotistical, and unwilling to share the spotlight, while Stella (Collette Wolfe) is a perky feminist who has just moved over from NPR.

== Cast ==
- Dane Cook as Cam Dunne
- Collette Wolfe as Stella Hoobler
- Jeffrey Tambor as Jefferson Mingus
- Joy Osmanski as Winnie Hyde
- Wolé Parks as Keith Calhoun
- Desmin Borges as Derek
- Trey Gerrald as Kent
- Chris Perfetti as Cody the Intern
- Tia Shipman as Angry Bob

== Episodes ==
No.	Title	Prod. code
1	"Pilot"	101
2	"Rent Control"	102
3	"The Tude and the Prude"	103
4	"Amber Week"	104

== See also ==
- List of television series canceled before airing an episode
