= Zoo or False =

- How I Met Your Mother episode
- Episode no.: Season 5 Episode 19
- Directed by: Pamela Fryman
- Written by: Stephen Lloyd
- Production code: 5ALH22
- Original air date: April 12, 2010

Guest appearances
- Collette Wolfe as Sarah; E. E. Bell as Walter; Matt L. Jones as Arthur; Celeste Thorson as Lisa; Collin Christopher as Simon; Jon Dore as Mugger / Zoo Keeper

Episode chronology
← Previous "Say Cheese"	Next → "Home Wreckers"
- How I Met Your Mother season 5

"Zoo or False" is the 19th episode of the fifth season of the CBS sitcom How I Met Your Mother and 107th episode overall. It aired on April 12, 2010. Episode hit season low with 2.8/9 rating and 6.88 million viewers.

== Plot ==
When the gang discovers Marshall does not have any money to pay for the pizza they had ordered, he is forced to reveal that he was mugged by a man (Jon Dore) with a gun in Central Park. Lily is worried, and aided by Robin's gun-loving nature, expresses her interest to buy a gun for protecting herself. Marshall is frightened by this prospect, and then reveals he was not mugged; instead, he had visited the Central Park Zoo, and while standing close to a monkey cage, a monkey had swiped his wallet. Robin asks to interview him for her show, and he agrees to help boost her show's ratings. Marshall then privately explains to Barney and Ted that the monkey story is false, and that he really was mugged; he had made up the monkey to calm down Lily and stop her from buying a gun. Furthermore, he refuses to lie on television and risk hurting Robin's credibility as a journalist.

Meanwhile, Barney is using the story of being mugged to pick up women. He is interrupted by a woman he had earlier convinced he was Neil Armstrong. He tells an even greater lie in an attempt to get out of it and suggests a threesome. When later telling the story to Ted, he claims to have gone through with it, but Ted notices he appears to have two drinks thrown in his face and concludes that the women actually rejected him.

The next morning, Ted brings along a scale model of the Empire State Building he had been working on; Ted had asked Robin to interview him about it, but she refused, but Ted brings it in case Marshall is unable to talk about the monkey mugging. Marshall is rattled when Robin reveals they have brought Bobo, the monkey from the zoo, as well, and the monkey will be separated from his mate Milly for committing the crime. Marshall finally refuses to talk about it, causing Robin to cut to a commercial and question him as to why. Marshall confesses that he made up the monkey story and Lily renews her intention to buy a gun, prompting Marshall to change his story back, but he again asserts that he was mugged by a human after being reminded what will happen to Bobo. Bombarded with everyone asking him what really happened, Marshall then says "I'm going to bed," before leaving, with the Future Ted never realizing what had happened, Lily never bought a gun, Robin's credibility remained intact, and Bobo and Milly lived out together their lives at the zoo. Ted and Barney had thoughts on the incident that one would be better off discontinuing telling lies and the other recounting the story to others with a better contrived ending. Robin is forced to interview Ted about his model, but as they are about to start, the monkey breaks free and snags a small doll nearby. It then proceeds to climb to the top of Ted's model, with the cameraman throwing paper aeroplanes at the monkey to get it off. Ted is left in disbelief that the ending from King Kong is being recreated before him, while Future Ted simply states "True story".

== Critical response ==
Donna Bowman of The A.V. Club rated the episode "Zoo or False" with a grade B−. Bowman claims that, although the script included many promising comedic elements, they "never seemed to settle into rhythm or find their natural relationship". The genuinely funny elements were overshadowed by a "lack of natural interaction or real emotion", originating with the cast's "unconvincing gales of laughter" at the idea of being mugged by a monkey. That stated, Bowman praised the episode addressing the line between a story and a truthful account, and a number of specific jokes in the episode.

Amanda Sloane Murray of IGN gave the episode 9 out of 10.

Cindy McLennan of Television Without Pity rated the episode with a grade C+.

Lindsey Bahr of The Atlantic said regarding the fun factor of the episode:

It left me contemplating big "what is the point of it all" questions, which is something a sitcom should never, ever, provoke its audience to do.

The Time magazine compared the episode to Pale Fire of Vladimir Nabokov but only in romantic comedy form and praised the climax where Marshall said "she's my sister/she's my daughter".
