= Freakdog =

- DVD cover of the film after being titled Red Mist
- Directed by: Paddy Breathnach
- Written by: Spence Wright
- Produced by: Simon Bosanquet
- Starring: Arielle Kebbel; Andrew Lee Potts; Sarah Carter; Stephen Dillane
- Distributed by: Starz Entertainment
- Release date: 22 August 2008
- Running time: 82 minutes
- Country: United Kingdom
- Language: English

Freakdog is a 2008 British horror film directed by Paddy Breathnach, that originally went under the title Red Mist.

== Plot ==
The film follows seven medical students who, while out partying one night, spike the drink of an unknowing and loner hospital janitor Kenneth, nicknamed "Freakdog". However, he has epilepsy and goes into a seizure before falling and hitting his head. His injury, combined with the alcohol and the drugs that he has ingested, causes him to fall into a deep coma. The students, not wanting to be involved or risk their futures for their crime, abandon his body on a road in front of the hospital and drive off as fast as they can, hoping someone will come across his body and help him. When they learn about his condition becoming fatal, one of the students (Arielle Kebbel) attempts to revive him using an experimental drug. The result has horrible and unintended consequences, leading to Freakdog having out of body experiences that allow him to possess the students who poisoned him and abandoned him. He exacts vengeance by possessing their bodies and through them, framing them for murdering each other while they desperately search for a way to stop him.

== Cast ==
- Arielle Kebbel as Katherine
- Sarah Carter as Kim
- Andrew Lee Potts as Kenneth, the janitor, cruelly nicknamed "Freakdog"
  - Art Parkinson as Young Kenneth
- Stephen Dillane as Doctor Harris
- Alex Wyndham as Jake
- Katie McGrath as Harriet
- Christina Chong as Yoshimi
- Martin Compston as Sean
- Michael Jibson as Steve
- MyAnna Buring as Shelby
- Colin Stinton as Detective Cartert
- Nick Hardin as Walt
- Michael J. Reynolds as Dr Stegman
- Sarah Boyd Wilson as Vanessa
- Emmett J. Scanlan as Stranger
- Jonny Gray as Harriet's Boyfriend
- Nathan S. Stewart as Handsome bar patron
- Bronagh Taggart as Kenneth's mother

== Production ==
Although set in the United States, the film was shot on location in Belfast, Northern Ireland.

== Reception ==
The film received a limited cinema release and reviews of the film were generally poor. On the review aggregator website Rotten Tomatoes, 0% of 14 critics' reviews are positive.

Writing for Dread Central, Johnny Butane rated it 2.5/5 stating in the conclusion of his review that it is "a good rental if nothing else jumps out at you, but don’t go out of your way for it." On Time Out magazine, Nigel Floyd wrote that "Shrooms director Paddy Breathnach still hasn't the foggiest idea of how to make a horror."

Peter Bradshaw of The Guardian rated it 1/5 stars and described the film as "a very ordinary, conventional, by-the-numbers creepfest without any dark spark." On Metro News (UK), Larushka Ivan-Zadeh rated it 1/5 stars writing that "big on yawns and short on screams, no cliché is left unharvested."

== Release ==
The film premiered on 22 August 2008 as part of the UK Fright Fest.

=== Home media ===
The DVD and Blu-ray was released on 10 February 2009 in the United States. In the UK and Ireland, the film was released on 3 July 2009 as Red Mist.

== See also ==
- List of horror films of 2008
- List of British films of 2008
