= Say Cheese (How I Met Your Mother) =

- How I Met Your Mother episode
- Episode no.: Season 5 Episode 18
- Directed by: Pamela Fryman
- Written by: Robia Rashid
- Production code: 5ALH17
- Original air date: March 22, 2010

Guest appearances
- Laura Prepon as Karen; Brooke Nevin as Amanda; Anne Dudek as Natalie

Episode chronology
← Previous "Of Course"	Next → "Zoo or False"
- How I Met Your Mother season 5

"Say Cheese" is the 18th episode of the fifth season of the CBS situation comedy How I Met Your Mother and 106th episode overall. It originally aired on March 22, 2010.

== Plot ==
It is Lily's 32nd birthday, and one of her first presents is a new digital camera with naked pictures of Marshall inside. Ted arrives at the door with his new girlfriend, Amanda, who has volunteered to bake Lily's cake, which upsets Lily and Marshall.

The group plays parlor games designed to test their knowledge of Lily, but Amanda does not know anything about her. Lily brings out a photo album showing pictures from past events where Ted has brought his dates along and says that Ted's dates always ruin the occasion. Robin admits not inviting Don because some of the gang's important events are not ideal to bring new friends. When Amanda reveals the birthday cake, which reads "Happy 42nd Birthday, Lori", Marshall gets angry and kicks Amanda out of the apartment. Marshall explains he has become cynical, having had to console every girlfriend Ted breaks up with.

Ted comments that all of the photos in Lily's photo album show no signs of the fights and disagreements that happened only moments before they were taken. Lily turns the page to the first photo that she, Marshall, and Ted had taken together back in college, a result of Ted inviting her into the picture because he believed that her and Marshall's relationship would last. Lily apologizes to Ted and agrees to call back Amanda.

Robin notices that Barney's pose is exactly the same in all of the photographs. Barney explains that he never takes a bad picture. He compares and contrasts his photo presence with Marshall's; while Barney always looks "drop dead, stone cold amazing", Marshall "just looks dead, stoned, and cold". Robin tries to take candid pictures of Barney, but is shocked to see his usual pose in all the pictures.

At Lily's 33rd birthday, Lily asks Ted to identify Amanda in the photo album, but he cannot remember her name. As they gather for the group photo, Robin offers Barney some dip. Barney realizes too late the dip contains cilantro, which he is allergic to, and begins to sneeze. Finally, Robin catches Barney in a compromising position for a bad photograph.

== Critical response ==
Donna Bowman of The A.V. Club rated the episode a B+.

Amanda Sloane Murray of IGN gave the episode 7.8 out of 10.

Joel Keller of TV Squad was less impressed, describing the episode as "half-baked". He wrote that the main premise needed to be explored further, that the B stories were underdeveloped, and that the episode left him dissatisfied.

Vlada Gelman of the Los Angeles Times enjoyed seeing an episode where the whole group was together in the same room, nicely tied together with flashbacks and flashforwards. Gelman suggests Lily just needs to learn to use the "skank removal tool" in Photoshop.

Alan Sepinwall of The Star-Ledger wrote: "I have to say, though, that the Marshall-with-his-eyes-closed running gag was funnier before the episode started calling attention to it".
