= The Job (2013 TV series) =

- Genre: Competition
- Developed by: Michael Davies
- Directed by: Joe DeMaio
- Presented by: Lisa Ling
- Composers: Nick Foster; Ken Bolam
- Country of origin: United States
- Original language: English
- No. of seasons: 1
- No. of episodes: 2

Production
- Executive producers: Jay Bienstock; Michael Davies; Mark Burnett; James Sunderland
- Producers: Dave Zigerielli; Celeste Corneilson McLaughin
- Editors: Landon Covington; Jerry Frizzel; Chris Lovett; Jamil Nelson; Michael Schwartz; Gary Simmerman
- Running time: 42 minutes
- Production companies: Embassy Row; Sony Pictures Television

Original release
- Network: CBS
- Release: February 8 – February 15, 2013

The Job is an American reality competition television series that aired on CBS from February 8 to February 15, 2013. Hosted by Lisa Ling, the series featured contestants competing in various challenges for a chance to win "a dream job at their dream company".

A pilot order for The Job was placed in March 2012 and the series was picked up in May for an expected midseason debut. Michael Davies and Mark Burnett served as executive producers. The series was canceled after two episodes aired.

== Episodes ==
No.	Title	Original release date	U.S. viewers (millions)
1	"The Palm"	February 8, 2013	4.01
In this episode, 5 contestants were vying for the Assistant Manager position at the Palm Restaurant in NYC. The contestants were put through a series of challenges and questions to test their qualifications for the position. The episode concluded with The Palm offering positions to two contestants: Jann Robinson and Ryan Pickett. Jann was awarded a position at one of the New York locations, whereas Ryan was offered a position at The Palm's soon-to-be-opened Boston location.
2	"Cosmopolitan"	February 15, 2013	3.31
