= Perfect Score =

- Genre: Game show
- Directed by: Rob George
- Starring: Arielle Kebbel
- Theme music composer: Ollie Gabriel & Ryan Pate
- Opening theme: "Don't Be Mad"
- Country of origin: United States
- Original language: English
- No. of seasons: 1
- No. of episodes: 12

Production
- Executive producer: Scott St. John
- Producers: Chase Fleming; Megan Fraher
- Production company: FremantleMedia North America

Original release
- Network: The CW
- Release: July 16 – September 27, 2013

Perfect Score is an American game show in which contestants attempt to choose the most compatible person for themselves from a group of ten strangers based solely on first impressions and short questions in hopes of earning $50,000. The series premiered on The CW on July 16, 2013.

Two contestants, usually friends, take turns eliminating individuals of the opposite gender whom they feel they are not compatible with. Each person of the opposite gender is assigned a dollar value for each contestant based on a compatibility test they took before the game began; higher dollar values indicate a higher compatibility, and lower dollar values indicate a lower compatibility. These values range from $50,000 to $1. When three individuals remain, the two contestants choose which of the three they feel they are most compatible with. The contestant who selects the individual with a higher dollar value wins both the money and a date with the person they selected.

== Episodes ==
=== Episode 1: I Need a Hero ===
First aired July 16, 2013

Contestant	Rachel's Cash Prize	Lacey's Cash Prize	Result
Mike	$5,000	$5,000	Chosen & Won by Rachel
Mike	$5,000	$5,000	Chosen by Lacey
Ben	$20,000	$1	Eliminated 8th/9th by Rachel & Lacey
Justin	$30,000	$10,000	Eliminated 8th/9th by Rachel & Lacey
Alex	$1	$40,000	Eliminated 7th by Rachel & Lacey
Nate	$1,000	$20,000	Eliminated 6th by Lacey
Court	$40,000	$500	Eliminated 5th by Rachel
Chris	$500	$1,000	Eliminated 4th by Lacey
Andreas	$50,000	$50,000	Eliminated 3rd by Rachel
Brandon	$100	$100	Eliminated 2nd by Rachel
John	$10,000	$30,000	Eliminated 1st by Lacey

=== Episode 2: It's a Bromance, Bro ===
First aired July 16, 2013

Contestant	Kyle's Cash Prize	Tyler's Cash Prize	Result
Jenny	$50,000	$1	Chosen & Won by Kyle
Olivia	Unknown	$40,000	Chosen by Tyler
Amy	Unknown	$50,000	Eliminated 8th by Kyle & Tyler
Koko	$500	$5,000	Eliminated 7th by Kyle & Tyler
Nesha	$1,000	$1,000	Eliminated 6th by Tyler
Steffi	$100	$100	Eliminated 5th by Kyle
Tiffany	$40,000	$20,000	Eliminated 4th by Tyler
Alex	$30,000	$10,000	Eliminated 3rd by Kyle
Eliana	$1	$500	Eliminated 2nd by Kyle
Marcela	$10,000	$30,000	Eliminated 1st by Tyler

=== Episode 3: The Rules of Love ===
First aired July 23, 2013

Contestant	Kristen's Cash Prize	Victoria's Cash Prize	Result
Jeremy	$20,000	$1	Chosen & Won by Kristen
Jeremy	$20,000	$1	Chosen by Victoria
Adam	Unknown	$30,000	Eliminated 8th/9th by Kristen & Victoria
Brandon	Unknown	$20,000	Eliminated 8th/9th by Kristen & Victoria
Phil	$50,000	$5,000	Eliminated 7th by Kristen & Victoria
Matt	$1,000	$10,000	Eliminated 6th by Victoria
Elijah	$30,000	$500	Eliminated 5th by Kristen
Richard	$500	$50,000	Eliminated 4th by Victoria
Nickolas	$1	$100	Eliminated 3rd by Kristen
Stephan	$40,000	$1,000	Eliminated 2nd by Kristen
Colby	$100	$40,000	Eliminated 1st by Victoria

=== Episode 4: Banking on Love ===
First aired August 16, 2013

Contestant	Liz's Cash Prize	Gloria's Cash Prize	Result
Scott	$10,000	Unknown	Chosen & Won by Liz
Rick	$20,000	$100	Chosen by Gloria
Jason	$30,000	Unknown	Eliminated 8th by Liz & Gloria
Caleb	$40,000	$30,000	Eliminated 7th by Liz & Gloria
Nikhil	$1	$40,000	Eliminated 6th by Gloria
Tripp	$100	$50,000	Eliminated 5th by Liz
Ryan	$5,000	$20,000	Eliminated 4th by Gloria
Darin	$500	$1	Eliminated 3rd by Liz
Ben	$50,000	$1,000	Eliminated 2nd by Liz
Nate	$1,000	$5,000	Eliminated 1st by Gloria

=== Episode 5: We've Got Spirit, Yes We Do ===
First aired August 16, 2013

Contestant	Kat's Cash Prize	Samm's Cash Prize	Result
Travis	$30,000	Unknown	Chosen & Won by Kat
Nick	$1,000	$20,000	Chosen by Samm
Nicholas	$40,000	Unknown	Eliminated 8th by Kat & Samm
Kevin	$10,000	$100	Eliminated 7th by Kat & Samm
Blake	$5,000	$10,000	Eliminated 6th by Samm
Richie	$50,000	$50,000	Eliminated 5th by Kat
Calvin	$100	$30,000	Eliminated 4th by Samm
Johnathan	$1	$40,000	Eliminated 3rd by Kat
Chris	$500	$1	Eliminated 2nd by Kat
Damien	$20,000	$500	Eliminated 1st by Samm

=== Episode 6: Married by 30 ===
First aired August 23, 2013

Contestant	Kiki's Cash Prize	Leah's Cash Prize	Result
Aire	$500	$30,000	Chosen & Won by Leah
Drew	$10,000	$50,000	Chosen by Kiki
D.J.	$40,000	$1,000	Eliminated 8th by Kiki & Leah
Dylin	$1,000	$20,000	Eliminated 7th by Kiki & Leah
Justin	$50,000	$40,000	Eliminated 6th by Leah
Brandon	$30,000	$10,000	Eliminated 5th by Kiki
Andy	$20,000	$100	Eliminated 4th by Leah
Ryan	$100	$1	Eliminated 3rd by Kiki
Dipal	$5,000	$500	Eliminated 2nd by Kiki
Matt	$1	$5,000	Eliminated 1st by Leah

=== Episode 7: Strike a Pose ===
First aired August 30, 2013

Contestant	Carmen's Cash Prize	Monique's Cash Prize	Result
Cameron	$5,000	Unknown	Chosen & Won by Carmen
Sheldon	$50,000	$5,000	Chosen by Monique
Dan	$20,000	Unknown	Eliminated 8th by Carmen & Monique
Sergio	$100	$100	Eliminated 7th by Carmen & Monique
Shane	$10,000	$40,000	Eliminated 6th by Monique
Chase	$30,000	$20,000	Eliminated 5th by Carmen
Lorenzo	$40,000	$50,000	Eliminated 4th by Monique
David	$1,000	$1,000	Eliminated 3rd by Carmen
Joe	$500	$500	Eliminated 2nd by Carmen
Larry	$1	$1	Eliminated 1st by Monique

=== Episode 8: Beauty Queen Battles ===
First aired September 6, 2013

Contestant	Nia's Cash Prize	Alicia's Cash Prize	Result
Joe	$500	$1,000	Chosen & Won by Alicia
Sean	$1	$5,000	Chosen by Nia
Mike	$30,000	$20,000	Eliminated 8th by Nia & Alicia
Travis	$50,000	$50,000	Eliminated 7th by Nia & Alicia
Ben	$1,000	$40,000	Eliminated 6th by Alicia
Nick	$100	$30,000	Eliminated 5th by Nia
Matthew	$5,000	$100	Eliminated 4th by Alicia
Jesse	$20,000	$10,000	Eliminated 3rd by Nia
David	$40,000	$500	Eliminated 2nd by Nia
Phil	$10,000	$1	Eliminated 1st by Alicia

=== Episode 9: Pillow Fight! ===
First aired September 6, 2013

Contestant	Charlie's Cash Prize	Courtney's Cash Prize	Result
Anjalee	$50,000	$5,000	Chosen & Won by Charlie
Anjalee	$50,000	$5,000	Chosen by Courtney
Lisa	Unknown	$40,000	Eliminated 8th/9th by Charlie & Courtney
Jenny	Unknown	$500	Eliminated 8th/9th by Charlie & Courtney
Nikki	$5,000	$1	Eliminated 7th by Charlie & Courtney
Raegan	$20,000	$10,000	Eliminated 6th by Courtney
Tia Nicole	$1,000	$20,000	Eliminated 5th by Charlie
Paris	$100	$30,000	Eliminated 4th by Courtney
Lisa Marie	$10,000	$1,000	Eliminated 3rd by Charlie
Rachel	$40,000	$50,000	Eliminated 2nd by Charlie
Savannah	$1	$100	Eliminated 1st by Courtney

=== Episode 10: Dress to Impress ===
First aired September 13, 2013

Contestant	Brook's Cash Prize	Kelly's Cash Prize	Result
David A.	$20,000	$1	Chosen & Won by Brook
David A.	$20,000	$1	Chosen by Kelly
Garrett	$1,000	$20,000	Eliminated 8th/9th by Brook & Kelly
Nick	$30,000	$40,000	Eliminated 8th/9th by Brook & Kelly
Jovan	$5,000	$500	Eliminated 7th by Brook & Kelly
Aaron	$50,000	$5,000	Eliminated 6th by Kelly
Erik	$40,000	$50,000	Eliminated 5th by Brook
David	$100	$1,000	Eliminated 4th by Kelly
Talon	$10,000	$100	Eliminated 3rd by Brook
Ben	$1	$10,000	Eliminated 2nd by Brook
Todd	$500	$30,000	Eliminated 1st by Kelly

=== Episode 11: It's Raining Men ===
First aired September 20, 2013

Contestant	Kahleel's Cash Prize	Jan's Cash Prize	Result
David	$50,000	$10,000	Chosen & Won by Jan
Alain	$10,000	$20,000	Chosen by Kahleel
John	$100	$5,000	Eliminated 8th by Kahleel & Jan
Kunal	$1,000	$500	Eliminated 7th by Kahleel & Jan
Spence	$30,000	$1	Eliminated 6th by Jan
Shane	$20,000	$30,000	Eliminated 5th by Kahleel
Adam	$1	$50,000	Eliminated 4th by Jan
Alberto	$500	$40,000	Eliminated 3rd by Kahleel
Roger	$40,000	$100	Eliminated 2nd by Kahleel
Steven	$5,000	$1,000	Eliminated 1st by Jan

=== Episode 12: Catch of the Day ===
First aired September 27, 2013

Contestant	Joey's Cash Prize	Zach's Cash Prize	Result
Kourtney	$20,000	Unknown	Chosen & Won by Joey
Keeli	Unknown	$500	Chosen by Zach
Allie	Unknown	Unknown	Eliminated 8th by Joey & Zach
Nikki	$100	$100	Eliminated 7th by Joey & Zach
Lexi	$1	$20,000	Eliminated 6th by Zach
Kelli	$50,000	$40,000	Eliminated 5th by Joey
Jade	$30,000	$50,000	Eliminated 4th by Zach
Brandy	$500	$1	Eliminated 3rd by Joey
Leyna	$40,000	$30,000	Eliminated 2nd by Joey
Michelle	$5,000	$5,000	Eliminated 1st by Zach

== Overseas version ==
Foreign version aired on Indonesia as Perfect Score Indonesia and was first broadcast on 16 November 2013 on MNCTV and has the slogan "Pilihan Tepat, Jutaan Nilainya!" (The Right Choice, Its worth Millions!), with the host Robby Purba and Amanda Zevannya.

In Vietnam, it was titled Điểm số hoàn hảo (Perfect Score) and broadcast 53 shows in Ho Chi Minh City Television from 28 May 2015 to 26 May 2016. Huy Khánh and Huỳnh Ngân are the hosts. 25,000,000₫ is the grand prize.
