= Brooklyn DA =

American news documentary series

- Genre: Documentary
- Created by: Patti Aronofsky
- Theme music composer: John Forté
- Opening theme: "Brooklyn Now"
- Country of origin: United States
- Original language: English
- No. of seasons: 1
- No. of episodes: 6

Production
- Executive producer: Susan Zirinsky
- Running time: 42 minutes
- Production company: CBS News

Original release
- Network: CBS
- Release: May 28 – July 6, 2013

Brooklyn DA is a six-part American news documentary series that aired on CBS. It follows the prosecutors of the Kings County District Attorney's office in Brooklyn, New York. The series premiered on May 28, 2013.

One of the largest district attorney's (DA) offices in the United States, the prosecutors routinely face cases of murder, mobsters, unscrupulous judges, political corruption, and young girls trafficked as sex slaves. The series was created by CBS News veteran Patti Aronofsky, and it is produced by the same team who produces 48 Hours.
