= 2012–13 United States network television schedule (late night) =

These are the late night schedules for the four United States broadcast networks that offer programming during this time period, from September 2012 to August 2013. All times are Eastern or Pacific. Affiliates will fill non-network schedule with local, syndicated, or paid programming. Affiliates also have the option to preempt or delay network programming at their discretion.

== Legend ==
- Light blue indicates Local programming.
- Gray indicates encore programming.
- Yellow indicates late night talk or variety shows.
- Gold indicates network news programming.

== Schedule ==
=== Monday-Friday ===
Network		11:00 PM	11:35 PM	12:00 AM	12:30 AM	1:00 AM	1:30 AM	2:00 AM	2:30 AM	3:00 AM	3:30 AM	4:00 AM	4:30 AM	5:00 AM	5:30 AM
ABC	Fall	Local programming	Nightline	Jimmy Kimmel Live! (12:05)		Local Programming			ABC World News Now			America This Morning	Local programming		
ABC	Winter	Local programming	Jimmy Kimmel Live!		Nightline (12:35)	Local Programming			ABC World News Now			America This Morning	Local programming		
CBS		Local programming	Late Show with David Letterman		The Late Late Show with Craig Ferguson (12:35)		Local Programming			Up to the Minute		CBS Morning News	Local programming		
NBC		Local programming	The Tonight Show with Jay Leno		Late Night with Jimmy Fallon		Last Call with Carson Daly	Today With Kathie Lee and Hoda (R)		Mad Money (R)		Early Today	Local programming		

NOTE: On January 8, 2013, ABC moved Jimmy Kimmel Live! to 11:35 pm and moved Nightline to 12:35 am.

=== Saturday ===
Network		11:00 PM	11:30 PM	12:00 AM	12:30 AM	1:00 AM	1:30 AM	2:00 AM	2:30 AM	3:00 AM	3:30 AM	4:00 AM	4:30 AM	5:00 AM	5:30 AM
NBC		Local programming	Saturday Night Live			Local programming (1:02)									
Fox	Fall	Encore Programming			Local Programming										
Fox	Summer	Animation Domination High-Def			Local Programming										

NOTE: On July 27, 2013, Fox launched Animation Domination High-Def.

== By network ==
=== ABC ===
Returning series

- ABC World News Now
- Jimmy Kimmel Live!
- Nightline

=== CBS ===
Returning series

- Late Night with David Letterman
- The Late Late Show with Craig Ferguson
- Up to the Minute

=== FOX ===
Returning series

- Encore Programming

New series

- Animation Domination High-Def

Not returning from 2011-12:

- Q'Viva! The Chosen

=== NBC ===
Returning series

- Last Call with Carson Daly
- Late Night with Jimmy Fallon
- Mad Money (reruns)
- Saturday Night Live
- Today With Kathie Lee and Hoda (reruns)
- The Tonight Show with Jay Leno
