= H (magazine) =

American magazine

h Magazine was an American magazine, published by Apple Ridge Films, a company founded by photographer, Robert Todd Williamson. The publication covered entertainment news, film, television, music, theater, books, multimedia, and popular culture. h's primary focus was entertainment media and critical reviews, and, while it was aimed at the wider consumer market, the magazine's viewpoint was from an industry insider perspective.

== History ==
The first issue was published on July 1, 2007 and featured actress, Julie Delpy, on its cover. The cover was shot by photographer, Laura Ann, in Paris, France. h was originally circulated as a free magazine in the greater Los Angeles, California area. In April 2008, h launched nationally and became a paid magazine, with Eddie Izzard featured on the cover. The magazine is no longer in publication or circulation.

h Masthead
Editor	Elizabeth Johnson
Creative Director	Mike Severson
Music Editor	Devoe Yates
Film Editor	Brent Simon
Copy Editor	Jason Dean
Assistant Music Editor	Bill Dvorak
Assistant to the Editor	Sarah Schiff
Assistant Fashioin Editor	Liz Tucker

== Typical content and frequency ==
The magazine typically featured celebrities on its cover pages and included a fashion celebrity spread on the inside, in addition to profiles, reviews, and general interest stories. All covers and fashion spreads were shot by the magazine's photographers.

h was published bi-monthly.

=== Celebrity Covers ===
- Julie Delpy
- Perry Farrell
- Ben Foster
- Mira Sorvino
- Michael C. Hall
- Bryan Greenberg
- Sarah Michelle Gellar
- Sam Rockwell
- Eddie Izzard
- Evan Rachel Wood
- Sir Ben Kingsley
- Don Cheadle
- Haley Bennett
- Anna Paquin
- Kerry Washington
- Elijah Wood
- Jennifer Beals
- Rosario Dawson
- Mila Kunis

=== Layout ===
h follows a typical magazine format by featuring a letters to the editor and table of contents in the first few pages, while also featuring advertisements. While some advertisements are unrelated to the entertainment industry, the majority of ads are typically related to fashion and upcoming television, film, or music events.

==== Features ====
The two largest stories in the magazine are the cover and the fashion story. The cover story can run between six and twelve pages while the fashion story is typically eight. h fashion spread notables include the first major spread on Twilight and Serena Williams. In addition, there are typically seven or eight major articles (one to two pages each) within the middle pages of the magazine. These articles are most commonly interviews, but there are also narrative articles as well. Feature articles tend to focus mostly on film and television. In the magazine's history, there have only been one non actor cover story (e.g.. Perry Farrell, August 2007).

==== Articles ====
- "Hot Stuff" is a two-page gift buyers guide which includes Beauty, Entertainment, Clothing and Tech ideas.
- "ICON" is a two- to three-page look at the life of an artist who has made a major impact on the arts.
- "Architecture/Design" is a two- to four-page look at new structures, trends and people in the architectural field.
- "On the Set" is a four- to six-page look onto the set of a film or television show, interviewing the cast and crew.

==== Columns ====
- "What the h?" an irreverent pop culture observation column is written by actor/writer/producer Derek Waters.
- "Detour Journals" written by actor Tobias Jelinek is a raw exploration into subculture.
- "The Wine Dog" written by Bob Ecker highlights wine and other alcoholic beverages.

==== Reviews ====
The three sections of reviews are Film, Music and Food & Drink. They take up six, eight and six pages respectively.

The sections are:

- "Film" typically features nine reviews both mainstream an independent titles. Each review is rated using the five star system and includes a list of two or three other title the reader would like if they liked the reviewed film. The magazine's Film Editor is Brent Simon.
- "Music" features reviews by Music Editor Devoe Yates and Assistant Music Editor Bill Dvorak. The section comprises a main feature (two to four pages), the h Jukebox, a cross section of six reviews, a cult pick, and a netpick. Each review is followed with a colorful Good For/Bad For commentary.
- "Food & Drink" covers restaurants and bars in Los Angeles and New York. The section is six pages long and includes recipes.

== Events ==
h Magazine typically throws issue parties to celebrate their covers, and various movie premieres. In addition h has sponsored the HollyShorts film festival for the last three years.

== Website ==
The magazine's website hmonthly.com provides users with daily content, breaking news, blogs, entertainment exclusives and serves as an archive for past magazine interviews, columns and photos.
