= David Lee (photographer) =

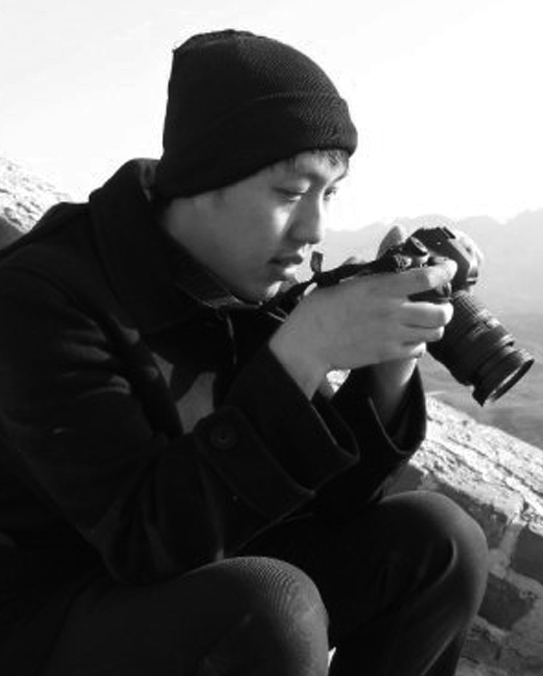
- Born: David Christopher Lee; July 21, 1982 (age 43); Whittier, California, US
- Education: University of California, Berkeley
- Known for: Photography Journalism
- Movement: Contemporary

David Christopher Lee (born July 21, 1982) is an American photographer and film director who does work in fashion, celebrity, entertainment, food, and art photography. As a Chinese American photographer, Lee's work incorporates his Chinese culture alongside a contemporary American perspective.

== Background ==
Lee was born in Whittier Presbyterian Hospital in Whittier, California, to a Chinese American family from Taishan, Guangdong, China. He has two younger sisters: Ashley, a California volleyball champion and Krystal, both co-founders of Club Green Volleyball Club in Southern California. Lee's father, Norman, is a former high school teacher and co-founder of Graphic Motion, in partnership with Lee's mother, Jeanie, who is the company’s CEO. Lee graduated from Glen A. Wilson High School, in Hacienda Heights, California, and the University of California, Berkeley.

== Early life ==
Lee's interest in popular culture and entertainment led him to pursue journalism and photography. At the age of seventeen, Lee photographed for *17 Magazine*, the Teen Choice Awards, Nickelodeon, Britney Spears, Beyoncé and 'N Sync.

== Career ==
In 1999, Lee began his career in the entertainment industry as a photographer on the red carpet. Lee's work has been featured on the Las Vegas Strip and in New York's Times Square. Lee is the co-founder of *TDink Magazine* with Bay Area graphic designer Tiffany Chin, and has started other publications, such as dTownLA.com, destinationluxury.com, davidsguide.com and Thebiohack. He has also directed and produced short films for Zac Posen, Jill Stuart and Lee Daniels. In 2025, Lee joined the advisory board of Minor Performer Alliance, a non-profit organization dedicated to ensuring the education and safety of minors working in the entertainment industry.
