= Room Nine =

American rock band

- Origin: Seattle, Washington, United States
- Genres: Alternative rock, psychedelic rock
- Years active: 1980–1988
- Label: C'est La Mort Records
- Members: Ron Nine; Scott Boggan; Shawn Allen; Michael Laton; Scott Vanderpool

Room Nine was a Seattle based rock band active from the early-to-late 1980s. Contrary to many of the bands in Seattle at the time, Room Nine had a much airier and psychedelic approach to their music. Although they never found the success of their peers, Room Nine was one of the early pre-grunge era Seattle bands that helped lay the groundwork for much of the later scene.

== History ==
Room Nine was formed in the early 1980s by Sammamish high school friends Ron Rudzitis (a.k.a. Ron Nine), Scott Boggan and Scott Vanderpool with light design guru Michael Laton added as the band's de facto light designer. Contrary to many of the bands at the time, Room Nine was influenced much more by psychedelic rock than punk rock.

Vanderpool suggested the band's name from the door of their portion of the beehive that was Seattle Rehearsal Studios near Gas Works Park. During Room Nine's early days, Rudzitis and Boggan's home was called the Room Nine House, a place where local musicians and friends would socialize after gigs. Rudzitis shared the home with Feast drummer Dan Peters (later of Mudhoney and Love Battery), renowned Seattle photographer Charles Peterson, artist Ed Fotheringham, occasionally Vanderpool and other scenesters. In his foreword to Charles Peterson's 1995 photo journal Screaming Life, author Michael Azerrad later cited the Room Nine house as a key part to the formation of Seattle's music scene. Sometime before 1984 original drummer Scott Vanderpool left to head for The Evergreen State College in Olympia, where he immersed himself in that town's burgeoning music scene. He met Bruce Pavitt (Sub Pop) and Calvin Johnson (Beat Happening, K Records), started the Young Pioneers with Brad Sweek and Chris Pugh (Swallow, Saba, Sun May) and was instrumental in the formation of the legendary Tropicana nightclub, where his old band Room Nine would play regularly. He was replaced by new drummer Shawn Allen, who would stay with Room Nine until the end.

In 1986, the band also signed to the tiny Louisiana based indie label C'est La Mort, appearing on the first installment of the label's Doctor Death series later in the year. In 1987 the band recorded and released the critically acclaimed Voices...On a Summer's Day LP. The track "Seas Without a Shore" was a hit on college-radio stations, and the band took second place in the Campus Voice Magazine/Snickers Candybar "New Music Search for the best unsigned band in America" (a contest won two years later by Vanderpool's future wife Laura Weller's band Capping Day). By 1988 the band had broken up however with each of its members going separate ways (Rudzitis onto Love Battery, Vanderpool onto Chemistry Set and radio DJing, Boggan briefly played in Black Sea with Michael Faulhaber and Danny Kelly (Heliotroupe), and then into the computer industry), and Allen into Peach and Cantona.

In the early 2000s (decade), Rudzitis, Laton, Boggan and Vanderpool reconvened under the new name 'Down With People' and began performing shows around the Seattle area. Currently the band is recording an album to be released on the Flotation Records label.

== Influences ==
Room Nine cited influences including Rain Parade, the Dream Syndicate, the Beatles the Yardbirds, Jimi Hendrix, Led Zeppelin, Cream, the Gun Club and punk rock.

== Band members ==
- Ron Nine (b. Ron Rudzitis) - vocals, guitar
- Scott Boggan - vocals, bass
- Scott Vanderpool - vocals, drums (1980–1986)
- Shawn Allen - drums (1986–1988)
- Michael Laton - light design

== Discography ==
=== Albums ===
- Voices...Of a Summer's Day (C'est La Mort Records, 1987).

=== Compilation/soundtrack contributions ===
- "Angels Sing" on Doctor Death's Volume I: Cette Enfant me Fia Mourir (C'est La Mort Records, 1986).
