= Hamlet (disambiguation) =

Hamlet is a tragic play by William Shakespeare.

Hamlet may also refer to:

== Arts and entertainment ==
=== Film ===
- Hamlet (1900 film) or Le Duel d'Hamlet, starring Sarah Bernhardt in the title role
- Hamlet (1907 film), a French silent film, with Georges Méliès in the title role
- Hamlet (1908 film), a French silent film
- Hamlet (1912 film), a British silent film
- Hamlet (1913 film), a British silent film
- Hamlet (1917 film), an Italian silent film
- Hamlet: The Drama of Vengeance, a 1921 German silent film
- Hamlet (1948 film), a British film, with Laurence Olivier in the title role
- Hamlet (1959 film), an Australian television play
- Hamlet (1961 film), a German film, with Maximilian Schell in the title role
- Hamlet (1964 film), a Soviet film, with Innokenty Smoktunovsky in the title role
- Richard Burton's Hamlet, a 1964 Broadway production with Richard Burton in the title role, filmed for theatrical release
- Hamlet (1969 film), a British film, with Nicol Williamson in the title role
- Hamlet (1990 film), an American/British/French film, with Mel Gibson in the title role
- Hamlet (1996 film) or William Shakespeare's Hamlet, a 1996 British/American film with Kenneth Branagh in the title role
- Hamlet (2000 film), an American film, with Ethan Hawke in the title role
- Hamlet (2009 film), a BBC television film, with David Tennant in the title role
- Hamlet (2018 film), a BBC television film, with Andrew Scott in the title role
- Hamlet (2025 film) a British film, with Riz Ahmed in the title role

=== Music ===
- Hamlet (band), a Spanish heavy metal band
  - Hamlet (album)
- Hamlet (Italian: Amleto), an 1865 Italian opera by Franco Faccio
- Hamlet (Thomas), an 1868 French opera by Ambroise Thomas
- "Hamlet (Pow Pow Pow)", a song from the 1982 album Junkyard by The Birthday Party
- Hamlet, a 2006 German opera by Anno Schreier
- Hamlet (Dean), a 2017 English opera by Brett Dean
- Hamlet (Tchaikovsky), two compositions
- Hamlet (Liszt), a symphonic poem by Franz Liszt

=== Other ===
- Prince Hamlet, protagonist of the eponymous play
- Hamlet (video game)
- The Hamlet, a novel by William Faulkner
- Hamlet, a character in the comic strip Hägar the Horrible

== Places ==
- Hamlet (place), a generic name for a small settlement

=== United States ===
- Hamlet, California, an unincorporated community
- Hamlet, Illinois, a census-designated place
- Hamlet, Indiana, a town
- Hamlet, Nebraska, a village
- Hamlet, New York, a hamlet
- Hamlet, North Carolina, a city
- Hamlet, Ohio, an unincorporated community
- Hamlet, Oregon, an unincorporated community
- Hamlet, West Virginia, an unincorporated community

=== Elsewhere ===
- Hamlet, Alberta, a community
- The Hamlets, Liverpool, England
- Hamlet (crater), a crater on Oberon, one of Uranus's moons

== Other uses ==
- Hamlet (name)
- Hamlet (cigar), brand produced by Japan Tobacco
- Hamlet (fish), a fish of the genus Hypoplectrus
- Hamlet (Oregon), a form of local government in the U.S. state of Oregon
- HAMLET (protein complex)
- FIM-43 Redeye, a surface-to-air missile system, known as "Hamlet" in the Danish service
- Hamlet chicken processing plant fire, 1991, North Carolina, United States

== See also ==
- Hamlet on screen, for adaptations of the Shakespeare work
- Hamlett, a surname
- Hamnet (disambiguation)
