= Fishtank (web series) =

American internet reality show

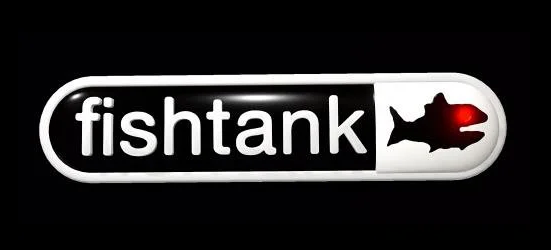
- Also known as: fishtank.live As Seen On (2026)
- Genre: Web show, reality show
- Created by: Sam Hyde and Jet Neptune
- Presented by: Sam Hyde (seasons 1–4); Bam Margera (season 5)
- Country of origin: United States
- Original language: English
- No. of seasons: 5

Production
- Producer: Jet Neptune
- Production locations: Massachusetts (seasons 1, 3 & 4); Rhode Island (season 2); Georgia (season 5)
- Camera setup: Multi-camera

Original release
- Release: April 18, 2023

Fishtank, also known as fishtank.live, is an American 24/7 livestreamed reality competition created by Sam Hyde and Jet Neptune. The show features contestants (known as the "fish") living together in a camera-monitored house for several weeks with minimal rules (Note: Contestants are typically not allowed to leave the house, use cellphones, and the windows are obscured with privacy film.) while producers stage unpredictable tasks and challenges for them.

Viewers can influence the show in real time by purchasing interactive features—such as playing sound effects, sending text-to-speech messages, or affecting the fish directly via "fishtoys"—to prank, harass, or support contestants, who endure "unfiltered" conditions while the live feed rolls continuously. The series premiered in April 2023 and has aired five seasons as of 2026.

By mid-2024 the series reached one million unique viewers and about $3 million in revenue. (Note: According to the same report, the first two seasons each logged over 100 million viewing minutes, with roughly 85,000 fans participating in paid interactions.) The show is produced by Hyde and Neptune, operating under their production company Fishnet Inc. In 2024, it migrated its streaming infrastructure to Livepeer Studio's decentralized platform.

== Premise ==
Fishtank's format is modeled loosely on "Big Brother"-style reality TV, but with an extreme, real-time interactive element. Eight to twelve contestants enter a furnished house equipped with cameras covering every room, with little to no external entertainment or communication beyond each other. Contestant selection is curated to include people with peculiar and intriguing personalities, with the aim of generating captivating content. Contestants are typically barred from leaving the house or using phones or the internet for the duration of the six-week (Note: Seasons 1–3; season 4 being cut short due to production issues after 17 days and season 5 shortened to four weeks) game.

Producers, including Hyde and Neptune, periodically present challenges or twists, such as timed tasks or staged events, that can lead to immunity, elimination, or rewards. Many of the challenges are designed to frustrate or disgust the contestants, whose physical and mental strain often becomes part of the spectacle. Viewers may watch the live stream 24/7 and pay to affect the environment. For example, they may purchase virtual tokens, or "fishbucks", to send prerecorded voice messages or trigger house events, or buy in-game items, "Fishtoys", that alter conditions, such as turning lights on or off, silencing a contestant, or forcibly handcuffing two contestants together.

== Production ==
The series is produced by Hyde and Neptune under their production entity Fishnet Inc. Beyond Hyde and Neptune, the show's visible production team has included Benjamin Taylor, a main production member and co-creator present throughout the series; Vance Latta, a season-one contestant who later joined the crew and has since worked in production roles including camera operation and in-house security; Cameron ("Mints"), who initially worked as a moderator on the platform before taking on a larger on-site operational role in season 4; and Matt ("Maejok"), who joined the crew around Bloodgames and has been associated with the show's live technical infrastructure, including cameras, audio, and servers.

== Cast ==
=== Hosts ===
- Sam Hyde (2023–2025) – Co-creator and primary host. Hyde frequently appears on camera (often in character) to explain challenges and interact with the contestants. He hosted Seasons 1 through 4 and was billed under his chaotic persona "Jason Goldstriker." He has had variations of the character, such as "Jebediah Goldstriker" in season 2, "The Duke" in Bloodgames, and "Jeremy Gold" or "G" in season 3.
- Bam Margera (2026–present) – In Season 5 (2026) the show announced a new host rotation; Bam Margera (former professional skateboarder and star of MTV's Jackass) assumed hosting duties for the latest season.

=== Recurring guests ===
Among the show's most prominent supporting personalities are "freeloaders" (non-contesting participants introduced to disrupt or reshape the house dynamic) who appear across seasons, generally due to being fan favorites adept at causing chaos in the house.

- Chris LaFon (better known as AirsoftFatty) – A recurring freeloader and occasional comic foil who appeared in season 1, season 2, Bloodgames, and season 3. A YouTuber from Michigan, LaFon became one of the series' most recognizable returning guest figures; his appearances generally emphasized endurance of awkward situations, improvised character work, and physical comedy reliant on his obesity, and in season 3 he briefly entered under the Famous House conceit before remaining as a freeloader and joining the final three fish in the Las Vegas RV arc.
- Frank Hassle (born Cameron Williams) – A fan-favorite freeloader who appeared in seasons 1, 2, and 3, often under aliases such as "Chad King", "Johnson", and "Wild Randy". Among the show's best-known antagonistic guest presences, Hassle was repeatedly used to intensify conflict inside the house through harassment, destruction of property, and confrontational needling of contestants.
- Alex Stein – A friend of the producers who appeared as a freeloader in seasons 1, 2, 3, 5, and Bloodgames. A Dallas-based comedian and online personality, Stein was typically introduced as an outside agitator whose role blended stunt casting with the show's broader taste for provocation; in different appearances he entered under alternate personas.

== Series overview ==
=== Season 1 (spring 2023) ===
The inaugural season ran from April 18 to May 30, 2023. It featured eight contestants from across North America living under the original Fishtank format. Josie Martinez won and received a cash prize of $35,000. During the program, additional characters, called "freeloaders", were introduced into the house. They could not compete for the prize money, but could interact with the fish, and received $1,000 if they tormented one into leaving the house. Most freeloaders were either fans of the show who wished to become contestants or well-known figures in niche online communities. Some were former contestants who returned with a new role after leaving the house.

==== Contestants ====
(§) – Freeloader (Guest)

Name	Role	Age	Gender	Place of origin	Arrived	Status	Days in house
Josie	Fish	21	Female	Arizona, United States	April 18, 2023	Winner ($35,000 prize)	42
Violetta ("Letty")	Fish	23	Female	Ontario, Canada	April 18, 2023	Runner-up ($20,000 prize)	42
Chris (Airsoft Fatty)	Freeloader	25	Male	Michigan, United States	May 15, 2023	Left on May 29, 2023	15
Frank Hassle	Freeloader	26	Male	United States	May 19, 2023	Left on May 29, 2023	11
Vance	Fish	25	Male	Auburn, United States	April 18, 2023	Eliminated on May 25, 2023	38
Simon	Freeloader	23	Male	Vietnam	May 15, 2023	Left on May 21, 2023	7
Sylvia	Fish	23	Female	Tulsa, United States	April 18, 2023	Eliminated on May 18, 2023	31
Brandon Buckingham	Freeloader	28	Male	Maryland, United States	May 10, 2023	Left on May 12, 2023	3
Damiel	Fish	27	Male	San Francisco, United States	April 18, 2023	Eliminated on May 7, 2023	20
Alex Stein	Freeloader	37	Male	Texas, United States	May 4, 2023	Left on May 5, 2023	2
Jonathan	Fish	24	Male	Bend, United States	April 18, 2023	Eliminated on May 3, 2023	16
Dontarius	Freeloader	24	Male	United States	May 2, 2023	Left on May 3, 2023	2
Lance	Freeloader	32	Male	Auburn, United States	April 29, 2023	Left on May 1, 2023	3
Betty	Freeloader	22	Female	Alberta, Canada	April 29, 2023	Left on April 30, 2023	2
Ella	Freeloader	22	Female	United States	April 27, 2023	Left on April 28, 2023	2
Mauro	Fish	24	Male	New Mexico, United States	April 18, 2023	Eliminated April 26, 2023	9
Simmons	Fish	29	Male	Suzhou, China	April 18, 2023	Removed on April 26, 2023	9

=== Season 2 (winter 2023–24) ===
The second season aired from December 18, 2023, to January 28, 2024. It had ten contestants and took place in a new house with a 1970s theme and the fish in period clothing. Unlike the first season, most contestants had some awareness of the show's premise.

At the outset, production told each contestant that they were a "plant" and the sole participant who already knew about "Fishtank", and that the other contestants were unfamiliar with both the program and Sam Hyde. This conceit quickly collapsed as the cast realized that several of them were aware of the show. The season was presented as an increasingly grueling and psychologically demanding competition, with production gradually pushing the house toward the so-called "hell house" phase as conditions deteriorated and the property was progressively damaged.

A further storyline involved the fictional "Initiative Group", a made-up cult devised by production and introduced through the attic segments. The conceit was originally meant to continue through the full season, with any eventual winner needing to join the group at some stage, but the storyline was largely abandoned after about two weeks. TJ was the only contestant to be formally incorporated into the Initiative Group narrative before it was phased out, making it a distinctive part of his arc during the season. TJ won the $50,000 cash prize.

==== Contestants ====
(§) – Freeloader (Guest)
(‡) – Visitor

Name	Role	Age	Gender	Place of origin	Arrived	Status	Days in house
TJ (Thomas)	Fish	23	Male	Henderson, United States	December 18, 2023	Winner ($50,000 prize)	42
Shinji	Fish	24	Male	Tokyo, Japan	December 18, 2023	Runner-up	42
Frank Hassle	Freeloader	27	Male	United States	January 19, 2024	Left on January 26, 2024	7
Chris (Airsoft Fatty)	Freeloader	26	Male	Michigan, United States	January 5, 2024	Left on January 26, 2024	21
Alex Stein	Freeloader	38	Male	Texas, United States	January 22, 2024	Left on January 26, 2024	4
Greg	Freeloader	26	Male	Tennessee, United States	January 10, 2024	Left on January 26, 2024	16
Tayleigh	Fish	20	Female	Stephenville, Texas	December 18, 2023	Eliminated on January 26, 2024	39
Trish	Fish	22	Female	Illinois, United States	December 18, 2023	Eliminated and immediately became a freeloader on January 21, 2024; Left on January 26, 2024	39
Taylor	Freeloader	21	Female	Florida, United States	December 28, 2023	Left on January 22, 2024	25
Britney	Freeloader	21	Female	Jacksonville, United States	January 19, 2024	Left on January 22, 2024	3
Duany'ay	Freeloader	24	Male	Missouri, United States	December 18, 2023	Eliminated on January 19, 2024	32
CK	Freeloader	22	Female	United States	January 12, 2024	Left on January 18, 2024	6
Bliccy ("Ali")	Freeloader	22	Female	Connecticut, United States	January 13, 2024	Left on January 15, 2024	2
Nick Rochefort	Visitor	41	Male	Rhode Island, United States	January 3, 2024	Left on January 13, 2024	2
Jimmy	Fish	27	Male	Ohio, United States	December 18, 2023	Removed on January 13, 2024	26
Brian	Fish	25	Male	South Carolina, United States	December 18, 2023	Eliminated on January 12, 2024	25
Delaney	Freeloader	21	Female	Myrtle Beach, United States	January 6, 2024	Left on January 12, 2024	6
Charleston White	Visitor	53	Male	Texas, United States	January 3, 2024	Left on January 5, 2024	2
Oliver	Freeloader	24	Male	Christchurch, New Zealand	December 31, 2023	Left on January 5, 2024	5
Nifty	Freeloader	25	Female	Boston, United States	December 21, 2023	Eliminated on December 31, 2023	10
Cole	Fish	23	Male	Arkansas, United States	December 18, 2023	Removed on December 28, 2023	10
JC	Fish	26	Female	Taiwan	December 18, 2023	Quit on December 24, 2023	6
Megan	Fish	24	Female	Sandusky, Ohio	December 18, 2023	Quit on December 22, 2023	4
Summer	Fish	21	Female	Kansas, United States	December 18, 2023	Quit on December 21, 2023	3

=== Season 2.5 / Bloodgames (summer 2024) ===
Between the second and third seasons, Fishtank aired Fishtank All-Stars Vampire Bloodgames, an interstitial spin-off commonly called Season 2.5 by fans and promotional material. The event premiered on June 25, 2024, and ran for about two weeks. Bloodgames was an outdoor live-action role-playing and survival variant featuring personalities from earlier seasons. Unlike the main seasons, there was no single grand prize winner; instead, players aimed to "survive" the game's narrative and challenges.

==== Contestants ====
(§) – Player (All-Star)
(‡) – NPC (Character)

Name	Role (Class)	Arrived	Status	Days on map	Notes
Tai	Gunslinger	June 25, 2024	Finished Game	14	Season 1 Freeloader
Letty	Witch	June 25, 2024	Finished Game	14	Season 1 Fish
Jimmy	Medic	June 25, 2024	Finished Game	14	Season 2 Fish
Greg	Hunter	June 25, 2024	Finished Game	14	Season 2 Freeloader
Vance	Sniper	June 27, 2024	Killed by Horde (July 8)	12	Season 1 Fish
The Duke	NPC (Vampire Lord)	June 25, 2024	Left on July 8, 2024	14	Portrayed by Sam Hyde
Xavier Ravenblood	NPC (Ninja Vampire)	June 25, 2024	Left on July 8, 2024	14	Portrayed by Jan Rankowski
Lore	NPC (Town Crier)	June 25, 2024	Left on July 8, 2024	14	Portrayed by Duany'ay (Season 2 Freeloader)
DJ	NPC (Xavier's Apprentice)	June 30, 2024	Left on July 8, 2024	9	Portrayed by TJ (Season 2 Winner)
The Trapper	NPC (Resident)	June 25, 2024	Left on July 8, 2024	14	Portrayed by Chip (Production)
Goblin	NPC (Troublemaker)	June 30, 2024	Left on July 8, 2024	9	Portrayed by Jason (Production)
Cage the Daywalker	NPC (Vampire)	June 25, 2024	Left on July 8, 2024	14	Portrayed by Scott Sullivan
Voodoo Mama Juju	NPC (Fortune Teller)	June 25, 2024	Left on July 8, 2024	14	Portrayed by Trisha (Season 2 Fish)
Sheriff Ben	NPC (Sheriff)	June 25, 2024	Left on July 8, 2024	14	Portrayed by Ben (Production)
Deputy Brian	NPC (Deputy)	June 25, 2024	Left on July 8, 2024	14	Portrayed by Brian (Season 2 Fish)
King Fattius	NPC (King)	June 27, 2024	Left on July 8, 2024	12	Portrayed by Chris (Airsoft Fatty)
Taylor the Villager	NPC (Resident)	June 25, 2024	Left on July 8, 2024	14	Portrayed by Taylor (Season 2 Freeloader)
Tayleigh	Chudette	June 25, 2024	Killed in Duel (July 7)	13	Season 2 Fish
Jon	Paladin	June 25, 2024	Quit (July 4)	10	Season 1 Fish
Doctor Mauro	NPC (Doctor)	June 25, 2024	Left on July 4, 2024	10	Portrayed by Mauro (Season 1 Fish)
Wild Randy	NPC (Cowboy)	July 3, 2024	Left on July 4, 2024	2	Portrayed by Alex Stein
Mikael	NPC (Elite Hacker)	June 27, 2024	Left on June 29, 2024	3	Portrayed by Jet Neptune

=== Season 3 (fall 2024, "Famous House") ===
The third season ran from October to December 2024. The house was upgraded to a large upscale residence and there were 12 contestants. The season began under the false premise that the participants had been cast as "Famous Stars" in a separate project titled "Famous House", presented to the audience as an over-the-top parody of scripted reality television shows such as Big Brother, but played straight to the contestants, who were selected due to their unfamiliarity with the original show. "Famous House" gradually transformed to "Fishtank", increasing the elements of absurdity and depravity ("boiling the frog") until the "rug pull" moment on day 14.

On November 24, after the show's true nature was revealed to the fish, 12 new contestants were introduced, believing they were participating in "Famous House". This created a situation similar to the one the original cast initially had, except that the remaining original fish (Burt, Binx, Payton, and Simbal) knew the truth and acted as plants, playing along with the new cast.

Late in the season, production left the principal house and shifted the remaining action to a recreational vehicle. The closing stretch was a road-trip-style continuation of the show, culminating in a trip to Las Vegas, where the season ended. Albert "Burt" Appouh was declared the winner but did not receive the advertised $50,000 grand prize, as it had been lost in a roulette bet during the Las Vegas finale.

==== Contestants ====
(§) – Freeloader (Guest)
(†) – Famous Star (2.0 Cast)

Name	Role	Age	Gender	Place of origin	Arrived	Status	Days in house
Burt	Fish	35	Male	New Jersey, United States	October 27, 2024	Winner ($0 prize)	42
Bianca ("Binx")	Fish	32	Female	Miami, United States	October 27, 2024	Runner-up	42
Chris ("Tank")	Famous Star / Freeloader	27	Male	Michigan, United States	November 25, 2024	Left on December 7, 2024	13
Frank Hassle	Freeloader	35	Male	Texas, United States	November 16, 2024	Left on December 7, 2024	22
Luke	Fish / Freeloader	31	Male	Weston, United States	October 27, 2024	Left on December 7, 2024	15
Mizzy	Fish / Freeloader	29	Female	Los Angeles, United States	October 27, 2024	Left on December 7, 2024	32
Jeffrey ("Jeff")	Freeloader	37	Male	Massachusetts, United States	November 13, 2024	Left on December 5, 2024	17
Alex Stein	Freeloader	38	Male	Dallas, United States	November 25, 2024	Left on December 5, 2024	4
Payton	Fish	20	Female	Tyler, United States	October 27, 2024	Eliminated on December 1, 2024	36
Jobe	Freeloader	25	Male	United States	November 7, 2024	Left on November 27, 2024	20
Kawan	Famous Star	22	Male	Dallas, United States	November 25, 2024	Ejected on November 27, 2024	3
Kevin	Famous Star	28	Male	Salt Lake City, United States	November 25, 2024	Ejected on November 27, 2024	3
Lily	Famous Star	??	Female	United States	November 25, 2024	Ejected on November 27, 2024	3
Tony	Famous Star	30	Male	Long Island, United States	November 25, 2024	Ejected on November 27, 2024	3
Star	Famous Star	32	Female	Hartford, United States	November 25, 2024	Ejected on November 27, 2024	3
Sky	Famous Star	??	Female	United States	November 25, 2024	Ejected on November 27, 2024	3
Shelby	Famous Star	??	Female	Reno, United States	November 25, 2024	Ejected on November 27, 2024	3
Alyssa	Famous Star	30	Female	Austin, United States	November 25, 2024	Ejected on November 26, 2024	2
Simbal	Fish	31	Male	Queens, United States	October 27, 2024	Eliminated on November 25, 2024	30
Alex B (2.0)	Famous Star	??	Female	United States	November 25, 2024	Ejected on November 25, 2024	1
Breezy	Famous Star	31	Female	North Carolina, United States	November 25, 2024	Ejected on November 25, 2024	1
Gianna	Famous Star	20	Female	New York, United States	November 25, 2024	Quit on November 25, 2024	1
Brandon	Famous Star	37	Male	South Carolina, United States	November 24, 2024	Removed on November 24, 2024	1
Braden	Famous Star	24	Male	Atlanta, United States	November 24, 2024	Ejected on November 24, 2024	1
Nifty	Freeloader	33	Female	Boston, United States	November 17, 2024	Left on November 23, 2024	7
Mule	Freeloader	??	N/A	United States	November 22, 2024	Left on November 22, 2024	1
Ian	Fish / Freeloader	28	Male	Hamlet, United States	October 27, 2024	Left on November 21, 2024	9
Alex B	Fish	38	Male	Louisville, United States	October 27, 2024	Quit on November 17, 2024	22
Connor	Freeloader	??	Male	United States	November 7, 2024	Left on November 17, 2024	11
Jean	Freeloader	60	Female	Rhode Island, United States	November 13, 2024	Left on November 14, 2024	2
Wyatt	Freeloader	32	Male	Pennsylvania, United States	November 9, 2024	Ejected on November 10, 2024	2
La'Ron	Fish	27	Male	Chicago, United States	October 27, 2024	Quit on November 9, 2024	14
Alexis	Fish	28	Female	Saxton, United States	October 27, 2024	Quit on November 9, 2024	14
Smaack	Fish	32	Female	Santa Cruz, United States	October 27, 2024	Quit on November 8, 2024	13
Ted	Fish	29	Male	Pennsylvania, United States	October 27, 2024	Ejected on November 4, 2024	9

=== Season 4 (summer 2025) ===
The fourth season began on June 13, 2025, but was cut short on June 30. According to the producers, all three potential filming locations raised zoning and safety objections, forcing production to halt.

No winner was declared. Instead, the remaining six contestants were awarded $8,000 each. This was the first season not followed by any edited episodes release, and marked Hyde's final appearance as host. Reaction to the cancellation was mixed, with viewers expressing frustration and confusion over the sudden end.

==== Contestants ====
(§) – Freeloader (Guest)
(‡) – Visitor (Special Appearance)

Name	Role	Age	Gender	Place of origin	Arrived	Status	Days in house
Ellie	Fish	18	Female	San Diego, United States	June 13, 2025	Finalist ($8,000 prize)	14
Daniel	Fish	21	Male	Dallas, United States	June 13, 2025	Finalist ($8,000 prize)	14
Freddy	Fish	36	Male	New Haven, United States	June 13, 2025	Finalist ($8,000 prize)	14
Direnç	Fish	28	Female	Melbourne, Australia	June 13, 2025	Finalist ($8,000 prize)	14
Aryeh	Fish	29	Male	Columbus, United States	June 13, 2025	Finalist ($8,000 prize)	14
Seth	Fish	25	Male	Ohio, United States	June 17, 2025	Finalist ($8,000 prize)	10
Violetta ("Letty")	Freeloader	25	Female	Ontario, Canada	June 24, 2025	Left on June 30, 2025	7
Bam Margera	Visitor	45	Male	Pennsylvania, United States	June 24, 2025	Left on June 27, 2025	3
Ricky Berwick	Visitor	33	Male	Ontario, Canada	June 22, 2025	Left on June 24, 2025	2
Angelina	Fish	22	Female	Jacksonville Beach, United States	June 13, 2025	Eliminated on June 20, 2025	8
Rachel	Fish	27	Female	Bridgeport, United States	June 13, 2025	Quit on June 19, 2025	7
Weck	Visitor	??	Male	United States	June 15, 2025	Left on June 18, 2025	3
Jin	Fish	23	Male	Osaka, Japan	June 13, 2025	Ejected on June 16, 2025	4

=== Season 5 (spring 2026) ===
The fifth season ran from March 15 to April 14, 2026. It took place in the Atlanta area, had ten contestants, and reduced the season length to 30 days. It was hosted mainly by professional skateboarder and entertainer Bam Margera. A guest-host rotation included Margera, Neptune, and former contestant Letty.

In contrast to the relatively spare house mechanics of earlier seasons, production added a more elaborate internal game system, including an in-house economy in which contestants performed daily jobs for cash that could be spent in a market room, along with amenity rooms that unlocked over time. On Day 25, season 3 fish Burt arrived as a freeloader and introduced the fish to "goo production", which required them to manufacture slime in a designated "goo room" in preparation for the finale.

The final competitors, James Drake and the Twins, faced off in a gauntlet of 39 challenges over 24 hours, which came down to a goo-wrestling tiebreaker won by Drake, who was awarded the $50,000 grand prize. As runners-up, the Twins were awarded $20,000.

==== Contestants ====
(§) – Freeloader (Guest)
(‡) – Visitor

Name	Role	Age	Gender	Place of origin	Arrived	Status	Days in house
James Drake	Fish	36	Male	Austin, United States	March 15, 2026	Winner ($50,000)	30
Haley ("Bingo")	Fish	26	Female	Mesa, United States	March 15, 2026	Runners-up ($20,000)	30
Ashley ("Bongo")	Fish	26	Female	Mesa, United States	March 15, 2026	Runners-up ($20,000)	30
Antara	Support robot	28	Female	Kolkata, India	March 21, 2026	Logged off on April 13, 2026	24
Violetta ("Letty")	Visitor	25	Female	Ontario, Canada	April 4, 2026	Left on April 13, 2026	10
Vimp	Freeloader	22	Female	Miami, United States	April 4, 2026	Left on April 13, 2026	10
Duany'ay	Freeloader	24	Male	Missouri, United States	April 4, 2026	Left on April 13, 2026	10
Burt	Freeloader	37	Male	New Jersey, United States	April 7, 2026	Left on April 13, 2026 ($50,000) (Note: Burt was awarded the $50,000 grand prize he was previously denied as winner of Season 3.)	7
Bliccy ("Allie")	Freeloader	25	Female	Connecticut, United States	April 7, 2026	Left on April 13, 2026	7
Bashir	Fish	30	Male	Minnesota, United States	March 15, 2026	Eliminated on April 12, 2026	29
Laura	Freeloader	24	Female	Honduras	March 27, 2026	Left on April 9, 2026	12
Steel Panther	Visitors	—	—	Los Angeles, United States	April 8, 2026	Left on April 8, 2026	1
Suzette	Freeloader	51	Female	New York City, United States	April 4, 2026	Left on April 7, 2026	3
Blane	Freeloader	27	Male	Fargo, United States	March 28, 2026	Left on April 7, 2026	10
April Margera	Visitor	67	Female	Pennsylvania, United States	April 7, 2026	Left on April 8, 2026	2
Phil Margera	Visitor	68	Male	Pennsylvania, United States	April 7, 2026	Left on April 8, 2026	2
Landon	Fish	22	Male	Stevens Point, United States	March 15, 2026	Eliminated on April 7, 2026; Returned as freeloader/janitor on April 8, 2026; Left on April 13, 2026	29
Bianca ("Binx")	Freeloader	34	Female	Miami, United States	April 2, 2026	Eliminated on April 7, 2026	5
Alex Stein	Visitor	39	Male	Texas, United States	April 3, 2026	Left on April 4, 2026	2
Alex B	Freeloader	39	Male	Louisville, United States	March 31, 2026	Removed on April 3, 2026	4
Emma	Fish	23 (Note: Emma was 22 when she entered the house but celebrated her 23rd birthday on March 27, 2026 (day 12).)	Female	Milwaukee, United States	March 15, 2026	Eliminated on April 2, 2026	18
JD	Fish	28	Male	Bay Area, United States	March 15, 2026	Quit on March 30, 2026	16
Carolina	Freeloader	26	Female	Austin, United States	March 27, 2026	Left on March 28, 2026	2
Anissa	Fish	29	Female	Marfa, United States	March 15, 2026	Left on March 26, 2026	11
Darius ("Mr. Naked")	Freeloader	21	Male	Iowa, United States	March 26, 2026	Removed on March 26, 2026	1
Beth	Freeloader	25	Female	Missouri, United States	March 24, 2026	Ejected on March 26, 2026	3
Head	Freeloader	56	Male	Philadelphia, United States	March 19, 2026	Left on March 22, 2026	3
Victoria	Fish	28	Female	Nebraska, United States	March 15, 2026	Quit on March 21, 2026	6
Charity	Fish	42	Female	Los Angeles, United States	March 15, 2026	Quit on March 17, 2026	3
Bezo	Fish	24	Male	Orlando, United States	March 15, 2026	Quit on March 16, 2026	2

== Edited episodes ==
After the first three seasons and the Vampire Bloodgames spin-off, the raw livestream footage was condensed into a series of edited episodes. These distill hundreds of hours of unscripted content into a structured narrative arc, highlighting key conflicts, character development, and major house events for a broader audience. The edited versions of Seasons 1 and 2 have been completed and released and Season 3 and Bloodgames remain in active production.

During a livestream on January 21, 2026, Benjamin Taylor and Jet Neptune discussed the difficulties of post-production and indicated that the project would place greater emphasis on improving its daily recap videos rather than continuing the edited-episode format. Therefore seasons 4 and 5, as well as subsequent seasons, will not receive the sort of full edited-episode treatment produced for the earlier installments.

=== Season 1 ===
Episode number	Episode title	Synopsis	Release date	Views (YouTube) (Note: as of April 2026)
1	Pilot	On the first day, the eight contestants arrive at the house, meet Jason Goldstriker, record introductory confessionals, and compete in a rice-counting challenge.	October 9, 2023	702,800
2	Full Potential	The series introduces Fishbucks, the first loot crate, and text-to-speech messages. The fish read introductory essays, take part in improv exercises led by Simmons, and clash over household conduct.	October 16, 2023	389,402
3	Nine Five	The fish are paired for the Baby Challenge and required to cook while handcuffed, while sabotage between teams escalates. After a police swatting interrupts the house, text-to-speech messages expose Simmons' writings, leading to his removal; Mauro then quits the competition.	October 23, 2023	361,313
4	Alaska	The fish take part in "The Cell", an endurance challenge ultimately won by Vance. Production later stages a disability-themed elimination challenge and introduces Warren as a guest participant; Jon is then eliminated.	October 30, 2023	284,082
5	Freeloaders	The house is converted into a makeshift indoor campsite with reduced amenities, and the first freeloaders are introduced. Letty's appointment as camp leader creates friction, the freeloaders dump the contestants' belongings into the basement, and Damiel quits after retaliating against Letty's possessions.	November 6, 2023	251,868
6	The Network	With the camping phase ending, additional guests and freeloaders circulate through the house, including Airsoft Fatty and Frank Hassle. Their arrival intensifies conflict within the remaining cast, especially as Frank's disruptive conduct and the ongoing harassment of Sylvia become central to the episode.	November 13, 2023	306,877
7	Mad Women	As the field narrows, production introduces further disruptions, including Sean Bey's appearance, Betty's arrival as a doppelganger of Letty, and Mauro's temporary return as a freeloader. Tensions among the remaining contestants continue to rise, and Sylvia is eliminated.	November 27, 2023	268,209
8	Axis	Late in the season, Alex Stein enters the house with Dontarius, while other former participants also reappear briefly. The remaining fish are subjected to further provocations and shifting alliances as the competition approaches its final elimination.	December 4, 2023	298,175
9	Pusher	A former contestant returns and one more competitor leaves the game, reducing the field to Josie and Letty. The episode serves chiefly to set up the final head-to-head endgame.	December 11, 2023	238,793
10	Cell	Josie and Letty face the multi-day "The Cell 2" finale, which combines endurance and performance challenges with continued interference from production and guests. Josie wins the season and the $35,000 prize, while Letty finishes as runner-up and receives $20,000.	December 18, 2023	304,812

=== Season 2 ===
Episode number	Episode title	Synopsis	Release date	Views (YouTube) (Note: As of April 2026.)
1	1972	The contestants arrive at the 1972-themed house, meet host Jedidiah Goldstriker, take part in a rice-counting challenge, and share introductory stories in the living room.	October 13, 2024	596,718
2	Madhouse	JC assumes the role of an "enemy spy", Summer attempts to prove herself to production, and the fish begin to realize that they all knew of the show beforehand.	October 20, 2024	424,169
3	True Romance	Summer departs, Brian and Cole compete in the "Gator Squats" challenge, JC leaves the house, Airsoft Fatty appears as Santa Claus, and Jimmy pursues supposed "doll activity".	October 27, 2024	324,712
4	Boiling Point	CK and Nifty enter as freeloaders, Megan and Cole leave the show, the male contestants fail at assembling a shelf, Sam cuts Trisha's hair, and freeloader Taylor enters the house and kisses TJ.	January 24, 2025	280,519
5	Initiative Group	Duany'ay and Delaney join as freeloaders, the house competes in a hot-dog-eating contest, Jimmy becomes angry with Taylor, and the fish perform wrestling-style promos. The "Initiative Group" cult plotline is revealed to TJ in the attic.	January 31, 2025	197,806
6	1973	The house celebrates the new year, the fish perform comedy routines, and TJ avoids elimination by choosing to remove Taylor from the show.	February 7, 2025	188,280
7	Production	TJ begins calling himself "Thomas", Octavius and Charleston White arrive as guests, Taylor briefly returns as a poker dealer, and Brian is eliminated.	February 14, 2025	199,285
8	Blunder	The fish take part in "The Cell" challenge, TJ cuts off his hair, Abi and Tai enter as freeloaders, TJ boxes Sam, and Jimmy is eliminated after throwing a mallet at Abi.	April 11, 2025	201,937
9	Great White	Tayleigh punches Trisha, Oliver joins as a freeloader, TJ boxes Ben, and Abi leaves the house. Jimmy returns, but TJ's boxing match with Jimmy leads to Jimmy's departure.	April 18, 2025	133,562
10	Pasture	Tai leaves the house, Frank Hassle arrives, the fish undertake the "Build a Bed" challenge, Ali and Chris enter, and the "Mommy and Baby Challenge" is held.	April 25, 2025	134,967
11	Dogpile	The house follows a script for a day, Chris introduces "Chris Points", Duany'ay defeats Oliver in a boxing match, Tayleigh and Shinji are harassed, and TJ boxes Tayleigh.	May 2, 2025	121,569
12	Painters	Greg and Alex Stein arrive as freeloaders, Trisha and Chris hold a wedding, Jackie visits, Tayleigh and Shinji shave their heads, and Trisha is redesignated as a freeloader.	May 8, 2025	171,306
13	In Living Color	The final three compete in the "Swamp Olympics", Tayleigh is eliminated, TJ and Shinji face one another in a final boxing match, and the season winner is declared.	May 30, 2025	129,164

=== Season 3 ===
Episode number	Episode title	Synopsis	Release date	Views (YouTube) (Note: As of April 2026.)
1	Pilot	The contestants enter the house under the false premise of competing on Famous House, meet host Jeremy Gold, undertake an opening candy-finding challenge, and learn that the first elimination will be decided by a house vote.	March 8, 2026	216,738
2	Live	As the contestants settle into the house, Burt begins to stand out among the group, and the first text-to-speech message is sent to him. The house marks Halloween by carving pumpkins, and Mizzy starts to suspect that the show is being broadcast live.	March 15, 2026	
3	Hulu	Production receives a call connected to Alex B, contestants begin forming alliances ahead of the next elimination vote, and the cast is misled into believing that Famous House has premiered on Hulu.	March 22, 2026	
4	Plant	Suspicion grows that one of the contestants is a planted participant, two teams compete to stage a mock murder scene, the theft of Mizzy's candy causes overnight friction, and Luke's frustration with the rest of the group escalates.	March 29, 2026	
5	Sweet	The contestants confront Luke over the previous night, production stages fake scenes and introduces mock sponsorships, several housemates gain immunity from the next elimination, and Luke is removed from the competition after entering the production basement, revealing that he was the plant.	April 5, 2026	
6	Smart	The fish react to Luke's elimination, a "last man dancing" competition is held for a trip to Las Vegas, and production introduces the constestants to "computer", the artificial intelligence who has been analyzing them throughout their first week. Text-to-speech messages are turned on. Mizzy is taken downstaris to become the new production plant.	April 12, 2026	

== Reception ==
Swansea Police Department bodycam footage documenting one of several instances of wellness checks being conducted on the contestants during the filming of season 4.

Public and critical reception of "Fishtank" has been mixed and polarizing, but the series has a sizeable audience and dedicated fanbase. By mid-2024, the show had amassed over one million viewers and generated significant revenue through its interactive model. Many commentators have called the raw, unscripted nature of "Fishtank" a selling point.

=== Controversies ===
"Fishtank" has been compared to controversial psychology experiments, such as the Stanford prison experiment, due to its manipulative social dynamics. The production has on several instances been accused of disrupting the peace in the communities where it was filmed. For instance, in January 2024 an animal rescue group reported retrieving ten chickens that had been released inside the Fishtank house as part of a comedy bit.

During season 4 in 2025, these problems intensified; after the cast was moved from a Swansea, Massachusetts, house to the season-two property in Cumberland, Rhode Island, local police reportedly halted production in response to complaints about unsafe conditions, and the Cumberland property was condemned the next day as an illegal lodging house with a fire-exit violation.

Eleanor "Ellie" Moon, one of Season 4's contestants, was confirmed to have died by suicide in May 2026, according to a Reddit post shared by her sister on July 17. Moon was 19 years old at the time of her death.

== See also ==
- Million Dollar Extreme
- We Live in Public
