= Amleto (given name) =

Amleto is a masculine given name, the Italian form of the given name Hamlet. Notable people with the name include:

- Amleto Frignani (1932–1997), Italian footballer
- Amleto Giovanni Cicognani (1883–1973), Italian cardinal
- Amleto Monacelli (born 1961), Venezuelan bowler
- Amleto Vespa (c.1888–1940), Italian spy
