= Small Town (disambiguation) =

"Small Town" is a 1985 song by John Mellencamp.

Small Town may also refer to:

== Music ==
- Small Town (album) or the title song, by Bill Frisell and Thomas Morgan, 2017
- Small Town, a 1976 orchestral composition by Peter Sculthorpe
- "Small Town", a song by Florida Georgia Line from Can't Say I Ain't Country
- "Smalltown", a song by Chumbawamba from Tubthumper
- "Elderly Woman Behind the Counter in a Small Town", a song by Pearl Jam, often referred to as "Small Town" by the band and its fans

== Television ==
- "Small Town" (Sports Night), an episode
- Smalltown, a 2016 Irish mini-series directed by Gerard Barrett

== See also ==
- Town

- Town (disambiguation)

- Village

- Village (disambiguation)

- Hamlet (place)

- Hamlet (disambiguation)

- "Try That in a Small Town", 2023 song by Jason Aldean
