= Hamlett =

Hamlett is a surname. Notable people with the surname include:

- Anthony Hamlett (born 1971), American mixed martial artist
- Barksdale Hamlett (1908–1979), United States Army general
- Bradley Maxon Hamlett, American politician
- Connor Hamlett (born 1992), American football player
- Denis Hamlett (born 1969), Costa Rican footballer and manager
- Dilys Hamlett (1928–2002), English actress
- Lol Hamlett (1917–1986), English footballer and manager
- Ray Hamlett (1933–1998), American politician from Missouri

== See also ==
- Hamlet (disambiguation)
