= Sam Hyde =

American comedian (born 1985)

- Hyde in 2016
- Born: Samuel Whitcomb Hyde; April 16, 1985 (age 41); Fall River, Massachusetts, U.S.
- Education: Rhode Island School of Design (BFA)
- Notable work: Million Dollar Extreme Presents: World Peace; Fishtank; Million Dollar Extreme Presents: Extreme Peace

Comedy career
- Years active: 2007–present
- Medium: Stand-up; television; YouTube
- Genres: Sketch comedy; anti-comedy; political satire; physical comedy; shock humor; surreal humor; post-irony
- Subjects: American politics; pop culture
- Website: mde.tv

Samuel Whitcomb Hyde (born April 16, 1985) is an American comedian and a co-founder of the sketch comedy group Million Dollar Extreme (MDE), alongside Nick Rochefort and Charls Carroll. MDE gained notoriety on YouTube for their provocative, anti-sketch style and public pranks, including trolling staged performances at conventions and comedy clubs that pushed social boundaries and courted controversy. Widespread public attention followed one such satirical TEDx talk.

Hyde and MDE created the television series Million Dollar Extreme Presents: World Peace, which aired on Adult Swim in 2016. The show featured surreal, boundary-pushing sketches that contained bigoted dog whistles, violence and misogyny, and quickly became polarizing, drawing both a dedicated fan base, especially amongst the alt-right, and significant criticism for its controversial content. The series was cancelled after one season, which Hyde attributed to his vocal support for Donald Trump, though others cited the show's offensive material as the primary reason for its termination. In 2023, Hyde created an interactive reality series called Fishtank.

Hyde is the subject of a recurring internet hoax in which he is falsely identified as the perpetrator of various mass shootings and terrorist attacks by online trolls, and he has played along with this hoax. His career has been defined by his willingness to provoke outrage through his transgressive style and his political messaging. He has provided financial support for neo-Nazi figure Andrew Anglin.

== Life and career ==
Hyde was born in Fall River, Massachusetts, in 1985, and was raised in Wilton, Connecticut. After graduating from high school in 2003, he attended Carnegie Mellon University for one year before transferring to the Rhode Island School of Design, graduating in 2007 with a BFA in filmmaking.

=== Million Dollar Extreme ===
Hyde, along with fellow comedians Nick Rochefort and Charls Carroll, founded the sketch comedy group Million Dollar Extreme (MDE) in 2009 and began uploading videos to YouTube. The channel content consisted of pranks, iPhone monologues by Hyde, as well as "strategically offensive acts of (sometimes public) provocation and anti-sketches". Pranks that were uploaded to the channel included Samurai Swordplay in a Digital Age, in which Hyde lampooned the American anime fandom under the pseudonym "Master Kenchiro Ichiimada" at a convention in Vermont, and Privileged White Male Triggers Oppressed Victims, Ban This Video Now and Block Him, in which Hyde read aloud several pages of homophobic 'research' at a comedy club in Brooklyn, prompting walkouts among the audience.

=== TEDx Talk ===
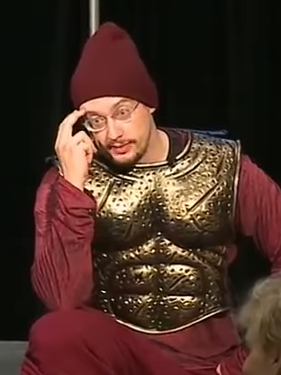
Sam Hyde's prank TEDx Talk, "2070 Paradigm Shift", in 2013

National attention focused on Hyde in 2013, when he was booked to deliver a talk at TEDx, titled "2070 Paradigm Shift", at Drexel University. Hyde took the stage dressed in a maroon sweatsuit and Roman-style breastplate and greaves, and delivered a speech in which he advocated for underwater vegetable farming, wiping Israel off the map, killing the elderly, and using trash as money. The talk was described by Forbes as a satiric impersonation of a "Brooklyn tech hipster," and The Washington Post described it as subversive brilliance, interpreting the work as a takedown of the TED talk concept.

=== Million Dollar Extreme Presents: World Peace ===
With this increased exposure, Adult Swim premiered a television program in August 2016, Million Dollar Extreme Presents: World Peace. The show was co-written by Hyde, and he acted in it along with the other members of MDE.

The series consisted of six eleven-minute episodes that contained anti-sketches, surreal production design, amateur acting, and pranks. Set "in an almost present-day post-apocalyptic nightmare world", the show satirized progressivism and anti-masculinity. Sketches were deliberately provocative, with characters being subjected to violence and verbal abuse. Hyde and Adult Swim emphasized the show's ironic nihilism, but journalists such as BuzzFeed's Joseph Bernstein drew attention to the show's popularity with the alt-right and raised concerns that the ironic nihilism contained dog whistles and could be, and was being, interpreted as racist, sexist, and antisemitic. Following an internal battle at Cartoon Network (the channel that hosts Adult Swim) over the show's content, it was cancelled after one season. Hyde alleged that this was due to his vocal support for Donald Trump.

In an email to The Washington Post after the cancellation, Hyde stated that the show included "a secret signal to the KKK, which is actually where a lot of my YouTube ad revenue comes from"; he also insisted that he was not being sarcastic and that while he had kept the connection a secret, he could openly talk about the KKK once the show had been cancelled. In an interview with The Hollywood Reporter in the aftermath of his series' cancellation, when questioned if he held a bias towards minorities, Hyde replied: "No, I wouldn't say that. I would say that I'm probably as racist or as biased as the average regular white guy or the average regular black guy."

=== 2017–present ===
In 2017, Hyde pledged $5,000 towards the legal defense fund of Andrew Anglin, the founder and editor of neo-Nazi website The Daily Stormer. The Southern Poverty Law Center sued Anglin for allegedly organizing a "troll storm" against a Jewish woman in Montana. When Matt Pearce of the Los Angeles Times questioned Hyde about the donation, Hyde asked Pearce if he was Jewish and went on to say that $5,000 was "nothing" to him. Hyde also stated: "Don't worry so much about money. Worry about if people start deciding to kill reporters. That's a quote. For the reason why, you can say I want reporters to know I make more money than them, especially Matt Pearce."

==== Fishtank ====
In 2023, Hyde and Jet Neptune launched Fishtank (also known as fishtank.live), a 24/7 interactive reality show where a number of contestants cohabitate and interact with viewers in real time for six weeks. The program has been compared to the Big Brother television franchise for its format, while others have compared it to the Stanford prison experiment for its content.

In March 2026, Hyde subsequently stepped down from hosting the show starting in its fifth season, the reasoning of which being the various zoning issues that the show has dealt with over the years, as well as losing general interest in the show, opting to focus on other projects like The Sam Hyde Show. Taking Hyde's stead for future seasons will be a guest host rotation, with the current host of Season 5 being former Jackass member Bam Margera.

== Misidentification hoaxes ==
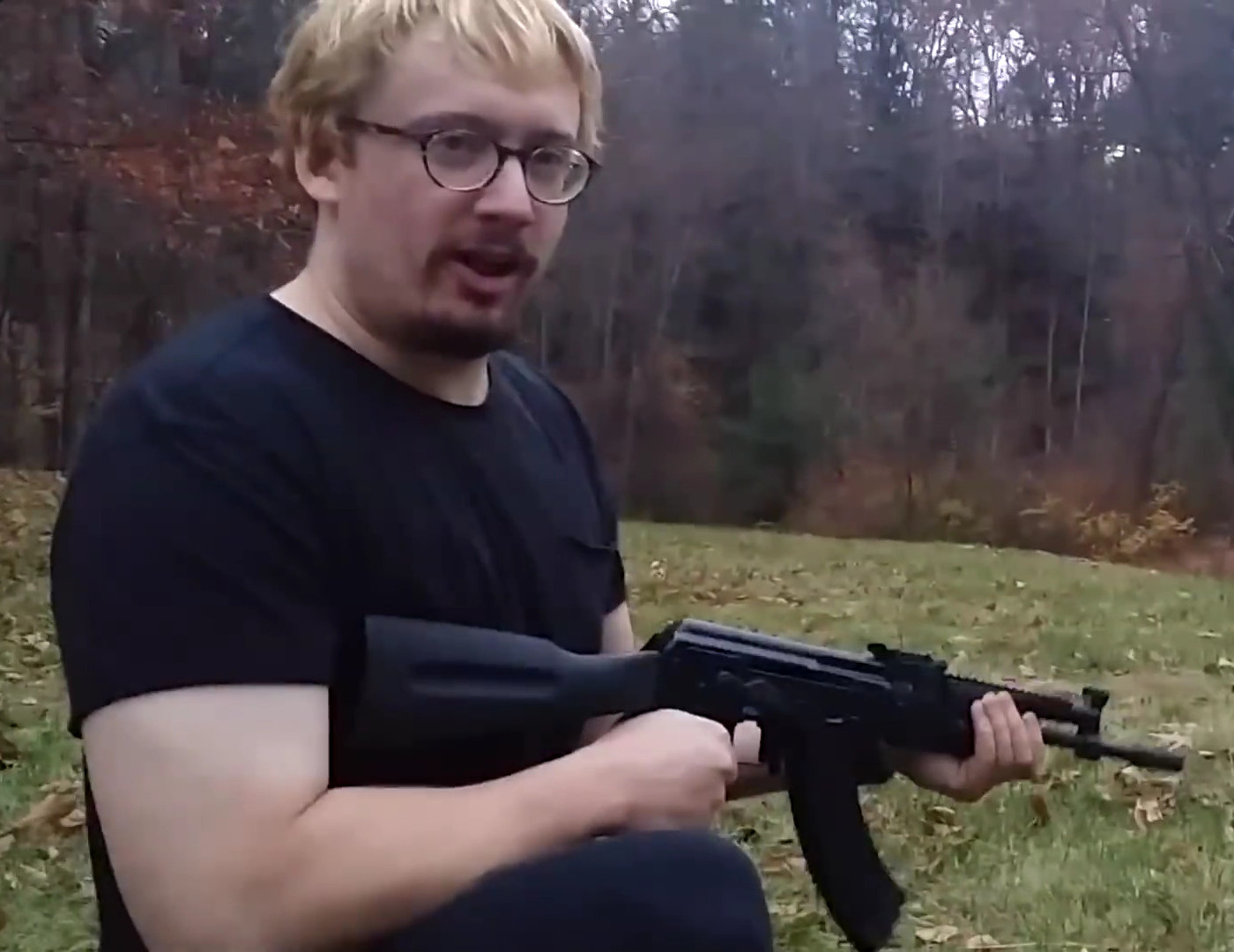
Sam Hyde in 2016. This and similar photos have been used by internet trolls when reporting Hyde as the perpetrator of mass shootings and terrorist attacks.

Fans of MDE responded to the trolling content of the show by using photos of Hyde, its creator, to convince multiple media outlets of his involvement in mass shootings. Hyde has played along with this as part of his anti-comedy stance. Some have argued he instigated the hoaxes himself through troll Twitter accounts.

The hoaxes, which typically included photos of Hyde brandishing a semi-automatic weapon and with a slightly altered name to appear more "authentic", reappeared so often on social media that The New York Times characterized "Sam Hyde is the shooter" as "an identifiable meme."

The first instance of the prank was the 2015 Umpqua Community College shooting. CNN mistakenly included Hyde's image in their coverage of the shooting. Hyde was also labelled as the perpetrator in high-profile shootings such as the Pulse nightclub shooting, Sutherland Springs church shooting (where he was misidentified by Representative Vicente Gonzalez) and the 2017 Las Vegas shooting. Hyde has also been erroneously blamed for other small-scale and large shootings, such as the attempted assassination of Donald Trump in Pennsylvania.

== Reception ==
Academics Matt Sienkiewicz and Nick Marx argue that Hyde's act is a form of trolling passed off as satire, where offensive statements can be made to evoke a suitable emotional backlash. In this way the response is itself performative. One group within the audience reacts to what they see, whereas the others in the audience become part of the trolling, enjoying the indignation they see in others. Advocacy group Hope not Hate has described Hyde as a "far-right activist with a history of racism, homophobia, misogyny and spreading antisemitic conspiracy theories", and argues he uses "a veneer of satire to create uncertainty around his actual beliefs". According to Sienkiewicz and Marx, as of 2024, Hyde had made it "increasingly hard to believe his anti-Semitism is anything short of sincere by continuously railing against Jewish comedians whom he believes conspire to blackball him", describing his 2017 donation to Andrew Anglin as "[saying] the quiet part out loud".

== Boxing ==
Sam Hyde
Personal information
- Nickname: The Candyman
- Height: 6 ft 5 in (196 cm)
- Weight: Heavyweight

Boxing career
- Reach: 81 in (206 cm)
- Stance: Orthodox

Hyde enjoys boxing and helped train Canadian YouTuber Harley Morenstein for iDubbbz's charity boxing event, Creator Clash. On August 27, 2022, Hyde made his boxing debut, defeating Australian social media star James "IAmThmpsn" Thompson during the 2 Fights 1 Night event in the O2 arena, London. Throughout fight week press conferences, Hyde adopted an Irish persona dubbed "The Candyman". In this persona, he spoke in a thick Irish accent, wore bizarre Irish-related clothing and a mask, and read candy-centric poems. Hyde defeated Thompson in the third round by TKO. After the fight, Hyde called out left-wing Twitch streamer Hasan Piker by threatening to murder him at his house while remaining in character as the Candyman, saying, "I am going to stalk him and become obsessed with him, and wear his makeup, and his dresses, and use his skin as a coat like the ancient Irish did."

He later went on to train comedy rapper Tyler Cassidy for his match against Chris Ray Gun for the second Creator Clash, scheduled for April 15, 2023. Weeks prior to the event, Cassidy was removed from the lineup of fighters, with William Haynes taking his place, sparking controversy and boycotts from fans of both Hyde and Cassidy. Cassidy accused iDubbbz of removing him from the card due to his friendship with Hyde. According to Cassidy and many fans of both creators, a potential major factor was that he had previously made jokes about subscribing to iDubbbz's wife's OnlyFans.

== Publications ==
Books

- How to BOMB the U. S. Gov't: The OFFICIAL Primo Strategy Guide to the Collapse of Western Civilization, with Nick Rochefort and Charls "Coors" Carroll. COM98 LLC (2016). ISBN 0997917601, 978-0997917604.

== Filmography ==
Television

- Million Dollar Extreme Presents: World Peace (2016, 6 episodes) – various, creator, screenwriter, producer
- Fishtank (2023–present, 5 seasons) – various, co-creator, producer
- Million Dollar Extreme Presents: Extreme Peace (2025, 6 episodes) – various, creator, screenwriter, producer

== Bibliography ==
- Aspray, Benjamin (2019). "On Trolling as Comedic Method". Journal of Cinema and Media Studies. 58 (3): 154–160. ISSN 2578-4900. JSTOR 26742027. Archived from the original on June 12, 2025.
- Boatright, Robert G.; Shaffer, Timothy J.; Sobieraj, Sarah; Young, Dannagal Goldthwaite (February 18, 2019). A Crisis of Civility?: Political Discourse and Its Discontents. Routledge. ISBN 978-1-351-05196-5.
- Donovan, Joan; Dreyfuss, Emily; Friedberg, Brian (September 20, 2022). Meme Wars: The Untold Story of the Online Battles Upending Democracy in America. Bloomsbury Publishing USA. ISBN 978-1-63557-864-5.
- Gilbert, Christopher J. (2025). When comedy goes wrong. Bloomington, Indiana: Indiana University Press. ISBN 9780253072528.
- Jennings, Ken (May 29, 2018). Planet Funny: How Comedy Took Over Our Culture. Simon and Schuster. ISBN 978-1-5011-0061-1.
- Sienkiewicz, Matt; Marx, Nick (March 26, 2024). That's Not Funny: How the Right Makes Comedy Work for Them. Univ of California Press. ISBN 978-0-520-40296-6.
- Sienkiewicz, Matt; Marx, Nick (2021). "Appropriating Irony: Conservative Comedy, Trump-Era Satire, and the Politics of Television Humor". JCMS: Journal of Cinema and Media Studies. 60 (4): 85–108. doi:10.1353/cj.2021.0046. ISSN 2578-4919. Archived from the original on May 4, 2025.
- Webber, Julie A. (December 11, 2018). The Joke Is on Us: Political Comedy in (Late) Neoliberal Times. Rowman & Littlefield. ISBN 978-1-4985-6985-9.
