= Million Dollar Extreme Presents: World Peace =

- Also known as: World Peace
- Genre: Satire; Shock humor; Sketch comedy; Surreal humor
- Created by: Million Dollar Extreme
- Written by: Sam Hyde; Nick Rochefort; Charls Carroll; Andrew Ruse
- Directed by: Andrew Ruse
- Starring: Sam Hyde; Nick Rochefort; Charls Carroll; Erick Hayden
- Country of origin: United States
- Original language: English
- No. of seasons: 1
- No. of episodes: 6

Production
- Executive producers: Andrew Ruse; Sam Hyde; Nick Rochefort; Charls Carroll; Alex Orr (Note: episodes 4 and 6 only); Keith Crofford (Note: executive producer for Williams Street); Walter Newman
- Producer: Cameron Boling
- Production location: Atlanta, Georgia
- Running time: 11 minutes
- Production companies: Million Dollar Extreme; Rent Now Productions; Williams Street

Original release
- Network: Adult Swim
- Release: August 5 – September 16, 2016

Million Dollar Extreme Presents: World Peace is an American avant-garde comedy television series starring and created by sketch comedy group Million Dollar Extreme that premiered on Adult Swim on August 5, 2016.

On December 5, 2016, the show was canceled by Adult Swim. The show had garnered controversy largely due to creator Sam Hyde's association with the alt-right.

== Premise ==
Each episode of World Peace is the Adult Swim standard eleven minutes in length, starring Million Dollar Extreme troupe leader Sam Hyde and frequent collaborators Nick Rochefort and Charls Carroll. Erick Hayden, another MDE sketch collaborator, also appeared in four episodes in an "also starring" role. Andrew Ruse, who worked with the troupe in the past, directed the series in addition to serving as writer and executive producer alongside Hyde, Rochefort, and Carroll.

The show was billed as being set in a dystopic near-future parody of the present political climate. Each episode is made up of multiple short sketches, broken up by hyperstylized intertitles. The show satirizes contemporary culture, political correctness, and anti-masculinity, among other things. The production design is often surreal, featuring campy costumes and avant-garde lighting and set design. The intertitles are slightly animated and for the most part contain many short passages of text. The text on the intertitles is often facetious, but sometimes earnest, and includes advice, social commentary, and tirades, some of which have been substantially censored. Each episode ends with a music video that usually plays behind the closing credits.

== History ==
=== Production ===
On May 7, 2015, Adult Swim announced their order of an untitled pilot by Million Dollar Extreme described as a "sketch show ... set in an almost present-day post-apocalyptic nightmare world". Based on that pilot, it was announced on March 3, 2016, that it would go to series with the group presenting it under the additional subtitle World Peace, and the first season consisting of six episodes under the network's traditional eleven-minute episode structure. The show was produced in-house by Rent Now Productions, Inc., and shot in Atlanta, Georgia. The show additionally benefitted from the Georgia production tax credit.

=== Controversy ===
During the show's initial run, BuzzFeed News writer Joseph Bernstein reported on creator Sam Hyde's alt-right social media activity. Bernstein also reported that a source told him the network's standards departments repeatedly discovered and censored "coded racial messages, including swastikas" being found in the original cut of the show. In the same article, fellow Adult Swim series creator Brett Gelman condemned the show as "an instrument of hate". Gelman would later cut ties with the network over Mike Lazzo's dismissal of criticism about the lack of female Adult Swim show creators, while also citing the network's greenlighting of World Peace as playing a significant part in the decision. Gelman's business collaborator, Tim Heidecker, also voiced his support for Gelman's decision to leave the network on Facebook. Writing for The Atlantic, David Sims also decried the content of the show, assessing that "plenty of sketches in Million Dollar Extreme seem to exist only to shock and offend", such as the sketch in which "Hyde appears in blackface, screaming at a woman in exaggerated vernacular."

=== Viewers ===
The show premiered to 1,033,000 viewers, and averaged 896,720 viewers over its run. The finale was its highest-rated episode, with 1,053,000 viewers.

=== Cancellation ===
Adult Swim announced on December 5, 2016, that the show would not be renewed for a second season. The network had received internal complaints about dog-whistling in the show and alleged harassment from Hyde and his fans. Negative press focused on Hyde's association with the alt-right. According to Hyde, despite Adult Swim executives' apparent interest to pick up the show for a second season, Turner ultimately decided to cancel the show.

Hyde also accused Tim Heidecker of using his influence with network executives to prevent its renewal for a second season, which Heidecker in turn has consistently denied. On December 8, 2016, Hyde phoned in to confront Tim Heidecker on his podcast. Heidecker dismissed Hyde's accusation of interfering, and claimed to receive threats and harassment from Hyde's fans, which Hyde countered was instead response to a political song Heidecker had recently released.

After World Peace's cancellation, the Washington Post asked Hyde about a reference to David Duke made in the show, to which Hyde responded: "That was a secret signal to the KKK, which is actually where a lot of my YouTube ad revenue comes from".

Following the cancellation, musicians whose work was featured on the show, including Molly Nilsson, Chastity Belt, Ovlov, and 3Teeth, disavowed the show. All four acts claimed that they were unaware of Million Dollar Extreme's beliefs or political views prior to meeting them or viewing their work. John Maus remained silent until a year later, when he told Noisey, "I never had, from what I know about it, any indication that anything other than certain instances of a sort of trolling was going on. What did they do that made them Nazis? Maybe I haven't looked into it."

=== Revival ===
In December 2022, Sam Hyde announced that funding had been secured for an independently produced Season 2, with Nick Rochefort also returning. In February 2023, Charls Carroll announced that he and Sam had reconciled after a lengthy feud and that he would also be involved.

In May 2025, Million Dollar Extreme announced a revival under the title Extreme Peace; the new series was an independent production, featuring six 30-minute episodes, with Erick Hayden joining the group as an official member as part of the revival.

== Episodes ==
No.	Title	Original release date	Prod. code	US viewers (millions)
1	"Your Vibe Attracts Your Tribe"	August 5, 2016	105	1.03
2	"Illegal Broadcast: John Hell Emergency"	August 12, 2016	102	0.84
3	"3 Down 47 to Go Countdown to Mass Funeral"	August 19, 2016	103	0.87
4	"Mad at Dad? GOMAD for Chad MGTOW"	August 26, 2016	104	0.81
5	"Not Everyone Thinks You're a Hero"	September 9, 2016	101	0.76
6	"You Hate This Show Because You Hate Yourself"	September 16, 2016	106	1.05
