= Alex Stein (comedian) =

American comedian and political commentator (born 1986)

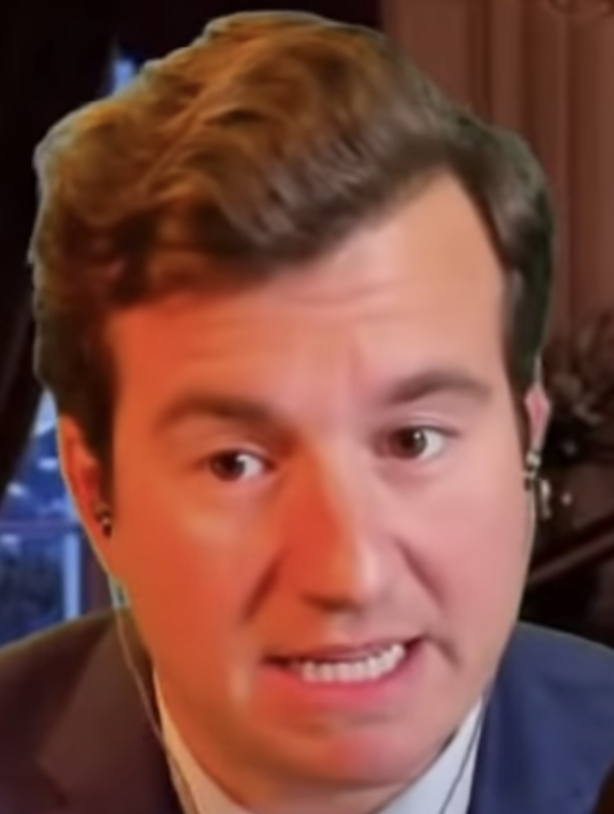
- Stein in 2022
- Born: Alexander Stein; October 8, 1986 (age 40); Dallas, Texas, U.S.
- Education: Louisiana State University
- Years active: 2011–present

Comedy career
- Genres: Political satire; Trolling

Alexander Stein (born October 10, 1986) is an American comedian and YouTuber known for disrupting local government meetings and confronting politicians and other individuals. He was the host of Prime Time with Alex Stein on Glenn Beck's Blaze Media network from 2023 to 2025.

== Early life ==
Stein was born to Kelly Stein and Rhett Stein, a bail bondsman. Stein grew up in Dallas, Texas. His father is half-Jewish. Alex Stein told the Jewish Journal that he did not get a bar mitzvah "or any of the cool Jewish stuff as a kid". Stein described being "obsessed with spy stuff" as a child, which he said led to his enjoyment of conspiracy theories.

Stein attended Highland Park High School in University Park, Texas. After high school, he attended Louisiana State University.

Stein moved to Los Angeles after graduating college to pursue a comedy career. Soon after, he returned to Dallas and worked at selling used cars with his father.

== Career ==
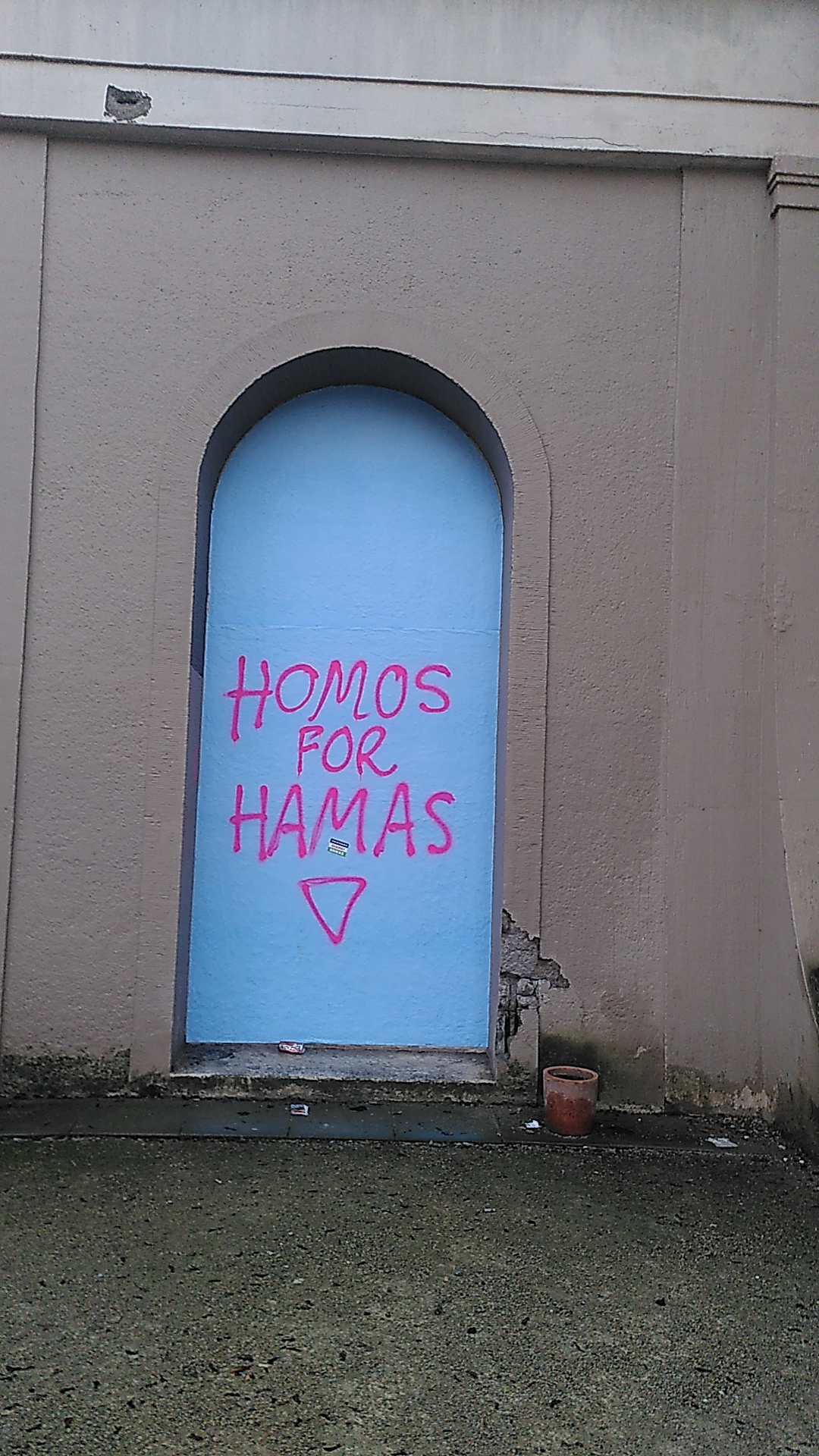
Stein's slogan "Homos for Hamas" (parodying Gays for Gaza) in graffiti with an inverted pink triangle, in Berlin in 2025 (Note: Pink triangle badges were originally used to mark gay men in Nazi concentration camps, but were reappropriated after the war as a Queer pride symbol. The inverted red triangle symbol was banned in Berlin in 2024, for its use in anti-Israel propaganda and protests.)

In 2012, Stein was a contestant in the reality TV show The Glass House, in which he described himself as having "no shame", asked viewers, "Should I turn into the most epic villain in the history of reality TV?". He was the first to be voted off by the viewers. He appeared on Season 4 of Worst Cooks in America on Bobby Flay's team in 2013.

Stein became known for disrupting local government meetings, sometimes virtually, during the COVID-19 pandemic. Stein said he began the disruptions after being frustrated by Dallas government unresponsiveness. His disruption of various other local government meetings including New York City and Las Vegas has included rapping about vaccines and other topics. In 2022, he rapped about the Russo-Ukrainian War at a city council meeting in Plano, Texas. D Magazine described Stein's city council pranks as "mostly harmless, if at times in poor taste".

In June 2022, Stein began harassing and haranguing politicians including Alexandria Ocasio-Cortez, Ted Cruz, Dan Crenshaw, Beto O'Rourke, Adam Kinzinger, and Eric Swalwell. He was described as sexually harassing Ocasio-Cortez on the steps of the U.S. Capitol in July 2022 by calling her a "big booty Latina" and accusing her of wanting to "kill babies". He told Kinzinger that he was a "d-bag". He called Crenshaw a "globalist RINO"; Crenshaw compared Stein to an angry little boy in a tweet after the confrontation.

In October 2022, an event featuring Stein and Proud Boys founder Gavin McInnes that had been scheduled by the group Uncensored America at Penn State University was cancelled by the university at the last minute after protests and confrontations; Stein taunted protesters and was spit on by one. In December 2022, Stein and a half-dressed man he called his "wife's boyfriend" broke into the lobby of Barstool Sports and were forcefully removed by security.

Stein was a candidate for the Board of Trustees of the Highland Park Independent School District in Texas, in an election scheduled for May 6, 2023. He received 1% of the vote, according to unofficial results.

In June 2023, Stein confronted female basketball player Brittney Griner and her Phoenix Mercury teammates, recording himself yelling at her as she walked through the Dallas-Fort Worth International Airport. In July 2023, Stein was scheduled to make his professional boxing debut against Iraqi TikToker MoDeen on the undercard of MF & DAZN: X Series 008 in Nashville, Tennessee, but the bout was called off after a press conference where Stein threw hot dogs at MoDeen, who is Muslim, and yelled "you love pork, right?". Stein later told The Sun that the hot dogs were turkey, not pork.

On February 8, 2023, Stein debuted Prime Time with Alex Stein on the American conservative network Blaze Media. In 2023, 2024 and 2026, he was in the reality web series Fishtank. Stein was emcee at the New York Young Republican Club 2023 event headlined by Donald Trump.

In July 2024, he was kicked out of the Republican National Convention after he disrupted an interview.

He engaged in a one-man parody activism campaign mocking LGBTQ advocacy in the Gaza war. In one incident that Stein shared on his own social media, he tried drawing pink graffiti saying "October 7", but genuine protestors washed it away. He sometimes used "Gays for Palestine" as his slogan, and the name of his parody organization. A similar phrase was used by Benjamin Netanyahu in a speech where he said "Gays for Gaza might as well hold up signs saying chickens for KFC". Stein also used more overtly homophobic mockery and slurs, including the slogan "Homos for Hamas".

In February 2026, Stein disrupted a Plano City Council meeting, appearing in an Indian outfit mocking the culture, incorrectly stating that they eat cow dung. This caused several Indian American citizens to walk out in protest.

== Political views ==
Stein's politics have been described by critics as right-wing, far-right, and alt-right. Stein himself has identified as a populist, and a centrist. During the COVID-19 pandemic, he criticized vaccine mandates, mask ordinances, and lockdowns. Stein has said he favors socializing the healthcare system.

== Personal life ==
Stein has said that he believes in God but not organized religion. He often refers to himself as "PrimeTime#99".

Stein's mother, Kelly Stein, died of COVID-19 in October 2021. Stein's father said Stein's experience of watching his mother get extubated "traumatized him" and "totally broke him down". Stein said the hospital's use of the antiviral drug remdesivir caused his mother's death.
