= Million Dollar Extreme =

American comedy group

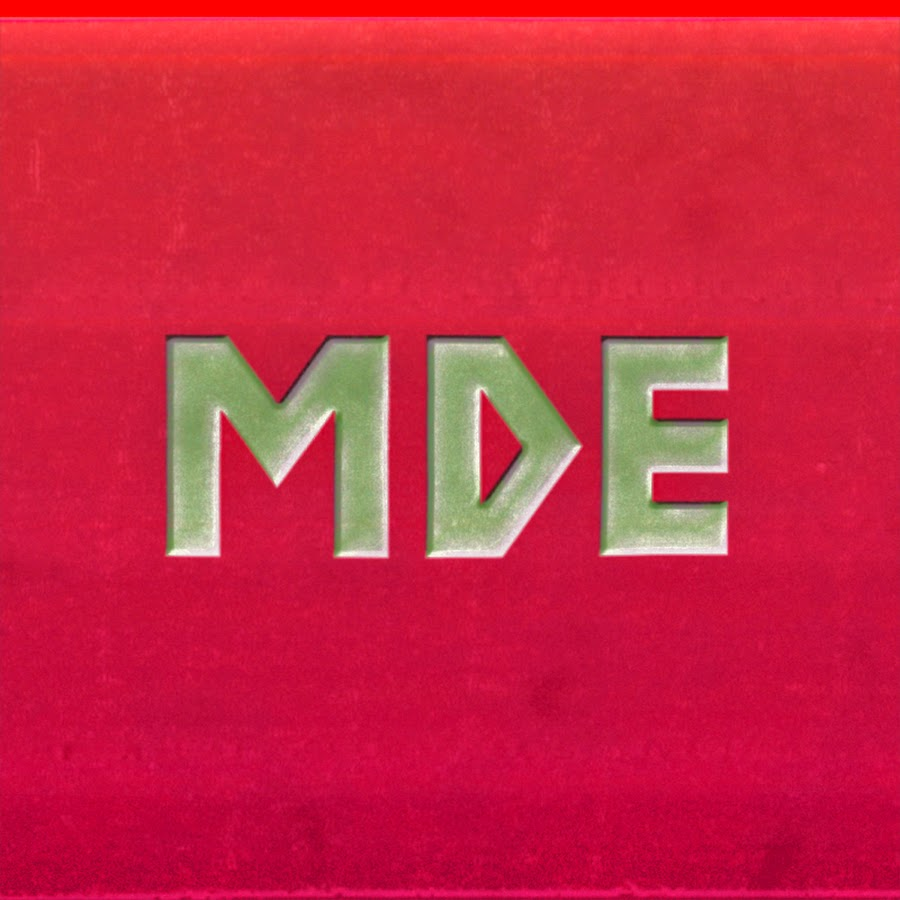
- Notable work: Million Dollar Extreme Presents: World Peace "Million Dollar Extreme Presents: Extreme Peace" "MDE - Million Dollar Extreme"

Comedy career
- Years active: 2007–present
- Medium: Internet and television
- Genres: Post-irony; Sketch comedy Surreal humor
- Members: Sam Hyde; Nick Rochefort; Charls Carroll; Erick Hayden
- Former members: James Price Andrew Ruse
- Website: mde.tv

Million Dollar Extreme (MDE) is an American sketch comedy troupe, founded by comedian Sam Hyde in 2007 during his time at the Rhode Island School of Design as his college thesis project. Comedians Nick Rochefort and Charls Carroll would join the troupe in 2008 and 2009 respectively.

The group had an eleven-minute sketch show on the Adult Swim network named Million Dollar Extreme Presents: World Peace, which was cancelled after one season following controversy surrounding Hyde's connections to the alt-right. The group's YouTube channel was permanently banned in 2018 for violating the website's community guidelines. A ban on the group's subreddit on Reddit followed a few months later, as the subreddit was a major outlet for users sharing white supremacist and white nationalist content.

== YouTube channel ==
Million Dollar Extreme started out making sketch comedy videos on their YouTube channel, which David Weigel described as "absurdist" and "transgressive", often centering around themes mocking political correctness. Sam Hyde's monologues, recorded on his iPhone, were also a staple for video content on the channel.

Hyde also performed numerous public pranks that he uploaded to the MDE YouTube channel. In 2013, Hyde delivered a fake TEDx talk titled "2070 Paradigm Shift" at Drexel University.

The troupe had various issues with online terms of service violations due to their content and fanbase. Their first ban from YouTube was in 2013, although the group continued to post online videos on several related YouTube channels after the initial ban. On May 4, 2018, their channel was permanently removed from YouTube for a violation of the site's community guidelines. On September 10, 2018, the group's subreddit on Reddit was permanently removed for violations of their policy regarding violent content.

== World Peace ==
In 2015, MDE were slated to have their own live action 15-minute sketch show on the cable network Adult Swim. It was to be set in a post-apocalyptic nightmare world that satirizes the current political climate. Titled Million Dollar Extreme Presents: World Peace, the series premiered on August 5, 2016.

The series consisted of six eleven-minute episodes that contained a series of anti-sketches, deliberately cheap performances, amateur acting and video segments including pranks. Sketches were deliberately provocative, with characters suffering violent abuses such as crashing through walls and tables, as well as being subjected to misogynistic and racist discourse. Hyde emphasized the show's ironic nihilism, but journalists such as Buzzfeed's Joseph Bernstein drew attention to the show's popularity with the alt-right, and raised concerns that the ironic nihilism could be, and was being interpreted as racist, sexist, and antisemitic.

World Peace was subject to internal controversy at Adult Swim due to concerns about dogwhistling in the show and accusations of harassment by Sam Hyde and his fans. Hyde's connection to the alt-right was reported in numerous outlets. In December 2016, it was announced that the show would not be renewed for a second season.

== Reception ==
Christian Williams of The A.V. Club described them: "Some videos borrow Wonder Showzen's toolkit, wielding subliminal blips and eye-straining text in service of subversive ends. Some make use of the Tim And Eric Awesome Show, Great Job! aesthetic, and some are surprisingly slick, with excellent, eardrum-shredding music courtesy of talented mystery-men like Orangy and Vaervaf." In the view of Philadelphia's Andrew Thompson: "The mission of Million Dollar Extreme has always seemed a spin on afflicting the comfortable, except its targets usually aren't the comfortably powerful. To the extent that satire exists in MDE's comedy, it feels like more of rationalization than a reason for the shock itself."

== See also ==
- Fishtank (web series)

== Bibliography ==
- Aspray, Benjamin (2019). "On Trolling as Comedic Method". Journal of Cinema and Media Studies. 58 (3): 154–160. ISSN 2578-4900. JSTOR 26742027.
- Boatright, Robert G.; Shaffer, Timothy J.; Sobieraj, Sarah; Young, Dannagal Goldthwaite (February 18, 2019). A Crisis of Civility?: Political Discourse and Its Discontents. Routledge. ISBN 978-1-351-05196-5.
- Donovan, Joan; Dreyfuss, Emily; Friedberg, Brian (September 20, 2022). Meme Wars: The Untold Story of the Online Battles Upending Democracy in America. Bloomsbury Publishing USA. ISBN 978-1-63557-864-5.
- Foreman, Gene; Biddle, Daniel R.; Lounsberry, Emilie; Jones, Richard G. (June 21, 2022). The Ethical Journalist: Making Responsible Decisions in the Digital Age. John Wiley & Sons. ISBN 978-1-119-77747-2.
- Marantz, Andrew (February 20, 2020). Antisocial: How Online Extremists Broke America. Pan Macmillan. ISBN 978-1-5098-8250-2.
- Sienkiewicz, Matt; Marx, Nick (March 26, 2024). That's Not Funny: How the Right Makes Comedy Work for Them. Univ of California Press. ISBN 978-0-520-40296-6.
- Sienkiewicz, Matt; Marx, Nick (2021). "Appropriating Irony: Conservative Comedy, Trump-Era Satire, and the Politics of Television Humor". JCMS: Journal of Cinema and Media Studies. 60 (4): 85–108. doi:10.1353/cj.2021.0046. ISSN 2578-4919.
- Webber, Julie A. (December 11, 2018). The Joke Is on Us: Political Comedy in (Late) Neoliberal Times. Rowman & Littlefield. ISBN 978-1-4985-6985-9.
