= The Glass House (2012 TV series) =

American reality television program

- Genre: Reality television
- Created by: Kenny Rosen
- Country of origin: United States
- Original language: English
- No. of seasons: 1
- No. of episodes: 10

Production
- Production locations: Los Angeles, California
- Running time: 41 minutes
- Production company: Keep Calm and Carry On Productions

Original release
- Network: ABC
- Release: June 18 – August 20, 2012

The Glass House is an American reality game show that premiered on June 18, 2012, on ABC, and aired for one season. Fourteen contestants live in the house and compete for $250,000. Voting by viewers helped decide which contestants got sent home.

== Format ==
The Glass House featured 14 strangers living in a house made of glass, with cameras recording their every move. At selected days and times, viewers can watch a live feed into the house. There are weekly eliminations, in which the public decides which of the contestants are eliminated from the game. Aside from choosing who is eliminated, viewers also dictate what the contestants wear, where they sleep and what they eat. While in the house, the contestants will split into two groups and compete in various physical and mental competitions. The captains of the two teams are the two contestants who have received the fewest votes from the public. After losing a challenge, the captain of the losing team is sent to limbo, along with a second member of that team which is voted on by the house. While in limbo, the public will vote which of the two contestants deserves to go back into the house and which one should permanently be eliminated from the game. The contestant with the fewest votes is eliminated, while the other will return to the house. The contestants are spoken to by a robotic female voice, which they referred to as the "Oracle" up until Day 3, when it was revealed the public would decide the voice's name. After the airing of the first live feed, online blogs and forums labeled the voice "FaRi", a portmanteau of the words faux and Siri, the personal assistant found on Apple's iPhone.

== Contestants ==
The cast of The Glass House. Top: Mike, Jeffrey, Holly, Andrea, Jacob, Robin and Alex Bottom: Erica, Gene, Joy, Ashley, Apollo, Stephanie and Kevin

When the original fourteen players were revealed, a woman named Melissa was included. Days after the announcement, however, she was removed from ABC's website, and had been replaced with Holly. ABC has yet to confirm why Melissa will not be participating on the show. The original fourteen contestants entered the house on June 11. On Day 5, Jacob voluntarily left the show during limbo and was not replaced.

Name	Age	Occupation	Hometown	Entered	Result	Reference
Kevin Braun	31	Police Sergeant	Toledo, Ohio	Day 1	Winner; Day 68	
Erica Russell	27	Cocktail Waitress	Denver, Colorado	Day 1	Runner-up; Day 68	
Andrea Clark	31	Bookkeeper	Valencia, California	Day 1	Third Place; Day 68	
Jeffrey Marx	35	Receptionist	Brooklyn, New York	Day 1	Eliminated; Day 66	
Mike McCarthy	48	DJ	Pembroke, Massachusetts	Day 53	Re-eliminated; Day 65	
Mike McCarthy	48	DJ	Pembroke, Massachusetts	Day 1	Eliminated; Day 44	
Gene	28	Stuntman	Chicago, Illinois	Day 1	Eliminated; Day 58	
Stephanie Link	30	Scientist	Boston, Massachusetts	Day 1	Bribed; Day 53	
Joy Glass	27	Nurse	Fredericksburg, Virginia	Day 1	Eliminated; Day 51	
Holly Yako	20	Retail Sales	Detroit, Michigan	Day 1	Eliminated; Day 37	
Ashley Forrestier	29	Paralegal	New Orleans, Louisiana	Day 1	Eliminated; Day 30	
Robin Ann	48	Blogger	Washington, DC	Day 1	Eliminated; Day 23	
Apollo Poetry	25	Poet/Magician	Phoenix, Arizona	Day 1	Eliminated; Day 16	
Alex Stein	25	Bail Bondsman	Dallas, Texas	Day 1	Eliminated; Day 9	
Jacob	28	Cook	Coos Bay, Oregon	Day 1	Walked; Day 5	

=== Future appearances ===
In 2013, Alex Stein appears on season four of Worst Cooks in America.

== Summary ==
On Day 1, contestants moved into The Glass House. Holly and Robin were placed in the "enemies" room, while Erica and Andrea were placed in the "friends" room. On Day 2, during the first live-feed showing, contestants played a game in which they had to guess the answer to questions that the public were answering live. The questions were multiple choice, and varied from topics such as whether it is acceptable to have sex on the first date to what is the rudest thing a person could do during a first date. Other questions involved the contestants reactions to learning their child was gay, and how long should a couple date before marrying. To answer the questions, contestants had to go to either the "friends room", "enemies room", the bathroom, or the kitchen counter, with each room symbolizing a specific answer. The contestants were later asked to tell who they felt their biggest threat was, with Andrea and Kevin receiving the most votes from their fellow contestants. They later split into teams to compete in the first competition. The competition, titled "Twist and Shout", featured the contestants solving a puzzle built onto the wall based on information about their fellow contestants. The contestants split into east vs. west to do the challenge, with the east team winning. Jacob was the captain of the west team, and therefore became the first contestant to be sent to limbo. The contestants had to choose whom to send to limbo with him later on.

On Day 3, the public voted for the contestants to each reveal their biggest regret. They had the option to go to a different room to tell their story, and several chose to use the "Twitter Room". Following everyone's confessions, the contestants played a game of "Guess the Sketch". They decided to split up Men vs. Women, with Erica and Apollo being the first drawers, and Jeffrey and Joy being the second. The viewers chose the object they had to draw. The public later voted for the contestants to hear the results of the sixth game in the Stanley Cup Finals over the results of the first game of the NBA finals. On Day 4, the public voted for the contestants to play dodgeball. After playing three games, they performed "sexy yoga", in which an instructor named Elizabeth joined them to teach them various poses, chosen by the viewers. On Day 5, Jacob and Alex were sent to limbo, with Alex receiving ten of a possible thirteen votes. Later that day, Jacob chose to leave limbo and walk from the game. With Jacob out of the game, Alex remained in limbo, with the public deciding whether he should return to the game or not.

On Day 9, Alex became the first person evicted from The Glass House. For the second week, the viewers chose to put Jeffrey and Robin in the "Enemies" bedroom. On Day 9, Ashley celebrated her birthday in the house. Contestants were also asked to share their worst birthday stories with the viewers. Later that day, contestants competed in a spelling bee, with the viewers choosing the words that the players had to spell. It was revealed later that day that a special guest would join the contestants tomorrow, though it was not confirmed who the guest would be. On Day 10, a Tom Cruise impersonator entered the house for an hour, and the contestants did their impersonations of various celebrities. They later discussed the topic of a man calling 911 over a sandwich, after a public vote decided the topic. Later that day, contestants competed in the second competition of the season, with the team captain being sent to limbo in a few days. Apollo and Ashley were chosen to be the team captain, and both took turns picking members for their team. The competition, "Ruffle Your Tailfeathers", featured teams having get a bunch of eggs into various birdhouses. Each of the birdhouses contains a prize or a challenge and each egg represents a player. Whatever birdhouse the egg lands in, that player either gets the prize or has to complete the challenge. Ashley won a $1,000 prize when her egg lands in a birdhouse, Jeffrey ends up having to peel 200 hard-boiled eggs by hand. Stephanie had to squeeze orange juice by hand and carry packing peanuts back and forth one by one, and Andrea has to blow up 500 balloons by herself. On Day 11, contestants drew pictures to describe their ideal mate, as voted on by the viewers. They also discussed the various things they missed about the outside world, and later talked about five trending topics on Twitter. Later that day, Apollo and Holly were sent to limbo, with Holly receiving ten out of a possible ten votes from the other contestants.

On Day 15, the contestants were asked to tell the public whom they would like to see return to the house, Apollo or Holly, and why they want them to return. They were later shown tweets from fans of the show, which ranged from who their favorite was, to whom they wanted voted back into the house. They later had to make their own costume using tape, trash bags, aluminum foil, and other items. While doing so, they had to explain what their worst Halloween costume was. Later, the contestants spoke about the most romantic moment that had happened to them. During a discussion on the contestants opinions on Proposition 8, most of the contestants, except for Andrea and Kevin, expressed their disapproval of the ban on gay marriage. Jeffrey, who is openly gay, and Andrea later had a heated discussion on the topic, leading to Jeffrey calling her an "idiot", though he later apologized. That night, the team captains were revealed, and chose their teammates. On Day 16, Apollo was eliminated from the game, and Holly returned to the house. On Day 18, Ashley and Robin's team competed in the third competition. The teams were given three choices which involved various tasks involving food. One member from the team would choose a task and perform it. The team would earn a point if the viewers had chosen the task they chose to do. Ashley's team won the challenge, correctly performing three tasks as opposed to Robin's two. On Day 19, Robin and Erica were sent to limbo.

On Day 22, contestants were read Twitter comments from viewers, and discussed the topic of "spanking" a child. The team captains are revealed later that night. On Day 23, Robin was eliminated, and Erica returned to the house, which created a stir within the house. The house became split, with two separate alliances: Andrea, Ashley, Holly, Mike and Kevin; Erica, Gene, Jeffery, Joy and Stephanie. That night, Ashley and Holly are revealed to be the team captains for the week. This makes Ashley's third consecutive week as team captain, and Holly's first. For strategic purposes, Kevin's alliance agreed that Holly would choose everyone from the opposite alliance to be on her team, and then lose the challenge. In the "Lab-A-Doodle" competition, the team captain stood in the center of a large circle with four holes on each side. They had to transport three balls by balancing them one at a time on the circle and dropping them into a tube. The team who finishes in the fastest time will be safe for the week. Against the plan of her alliance, Holly's team won the competition. On Day 26, Ashley was sent to limbo, along with Kevin, who was voted upon by the other contestants.

On Day 29, a chef and a wine expert entered the house and served the contestants wine and food. While eating, the viewers chose who sat across from who. They later did an interpretive water dance, with the viewers voting that Jeffrey and Andrea had the best dance. On Day 30, Ashley was eliminated and Kevin returned from limbo. Later that night, Mike and Holly were revealed as the team captains. On Day 31, contestants competed in the "Choose Your Weapon" competition, in which the teams used a weapon to try to smash the opposing team's glass. The glass was on a windmill device, constantly rotating. The first team to smash all eight of their opponent's glasses won. Mike's team won the competition. On Day 32, Holly and Andrea were sent to limbo, after Andrea received four votes from the other contestants. Later in the week, Alex returned to The Glass House and delivered the contestants their "fanswers" for the week.

On Day 37, Holly was eliminated from the house, and Andrea returned. Mike and Stephanie were later announced as the team captains for the week. On Day 39, the contestants fought each other using giant boxing gloves. Sensai Mark came and instructed them on how to fight properly. During the team draft, Mike chose Andrea, Gene, and Jeffrey, while Stephanie chose Erica, Joy, and Kevin. In the "Spinner Code" challenge, two members of the team sat on a giant decoder wheel with colors on it that pointed to images. A spotter would be watching the decoder, and would tell the puzzle solver what the decoder was showing. The puzzle solver would take the four answers and find out what they had in common. After finding out this answer, they would buzz in their final time. Stephanie's team won the competition, meaning Mike and another member of his team would be sent to limbo. Jeffrey later volunteered to go to limbo, and was voted in by a unanimous seven to zero vote.

On Day 44, Mike was eliminated from the house, and Jeffrey returned. Joy and Stephanie were later announced as the team captains for the week. On Day 46, during a live feed, the players were informed of the Aurora, Colorado theater shooting that took place on Friday, July 20, 2012. During that live feed, Ori also provided an aquatic-themed activity in which the players dressed up in snorkeling equipment and were tasked to pop 500 balloons and find money in them. Whoever retrieved the highest amount of money won the activity, with an additional $500 reward. Andrea won by retrieving $123. Later that week, Andrea's family visited the Glass House and delivered her Fanswers as well. During the competition, the contestants played a large version of ski ball, in which the teams would alternate turns in attempts to get four points. There was also a prize slot, which featured money and other items. Kevin won $5,000 in the game, after getting a ball in both the $3,000 and $2,000 slots. Stephanie's team won the competition with a four to zero score. Joy and Andrea were sent to limbo.

On Day 51, it was revealed Joy had been eliminated, and Andrea returned to the game. On Day 53, however, both Joy and Mike were raised back into the house in the tubes, though the glass doors did not open. It was then revealed that if one of the currently competing contestants chose to take a cash prize and walk from the game, that either Mike or Joy would return to the game. Which of the two would return was decided upon by the viewers. Stephanie chose to take the money, and thus walked from the game. It was later revealed she had earned $37,000. Mike re-entered the house moments later. Later that day, Jeffrey and Gene were revealed as the Team Captains for the week. In the challenge, everyone would be puppeteers of their emotion voted on by the viewers (Andrea was happy, Kevin was cool, Erica was love-crazy, Mike was grumpy, Jeffrey was crybaby, and Gene was boring). Using their puppet, each player (who was cut off from the rest of their team) would need to transfer their emoticon from shelves on one side of a room, to a bucket on the other side. However, house-guests could go into temptation and receive $500 for every emoticon they dropped into their prize bucket (Jeffrey won $2,000 and Mike won $5,000). The team with the most emoticons in the team bucket at the end of the competition would win. Jeffrey's team of himself, Andrea, and Kevin won the competition. Gene was joined by Erica, who was voted into Limbo in a three to two vote.

On Day 58, it was revealed Gene had been eliminated, and Erica returned to the game. Mike was announced as receiving the fewest votes from the viewers, automatically putting him into the challenge. The other houseguests had to vote on who would compete against Mike for immunity; Kevin voted for Andrea, Andrea voted for Erica, Erica and Jeffrey both voted for Jeffrey, making Jeffrey compete against Mike. In the challenge, Jeffrey and Mike had to climb a ladder to the top of a fake house and repel down, while making a mental note of each room within the house. Each room was based on past houseguests who had been eliminated. Once at the bottom, Jeffrey and Mike would have to answer memory questions about each room. Jeffrey won, resulting in Mike going into limbo with either Andrea, Erica, or Kevin. Erica was sent into Limbo with Mike, making this her third time entering Limbo. However, the viewers voted to leave Mike and Erica in the house for their Limbo sentencing, allowing them to participate in the Live Feed. It was also revealed to the house that the next two eliminations and a challenge would happen live, all in the next two days in the house.

On Day 65, it was revealed that Mike had been re-eliminated, leaving Jeffrey, Andrea, Kevin, and Erica as the final four. Later that day on a live feed, the players competed in a live challenge. The challenge involved harnessed to a rope, ten feet above the floor. Each contestant must grab a puzzle piece, jump sixteen feet to the next platform, and place the puzzle piece on a four sided pyramid. Only one puzzle piece can be transferred at a time. Once the puzzle (which spells out that player's name) is complete, that contestant has won. Andrea won the challenge, automatically allowing her to move into the Final 3. The three non-winners (Erica, Jeffrey, Kevin) were all put into a poll that would decide who would join Andrea in the Final 3. On Day 66, it was revealed that Erica received the most votes and was safe. Jeffrey and Kevin were sent to limbo. Jeffrey received the fewest votes and was eliminated. The final three was officially: Andrea, Erica, and Kevin. Day 68 was the season finale. Kevin was announced the winner, while Erica was runner-up and Andrea placed third.

== Voting history ==
Color key:

Winner
Runner-up
Third Place
Winning Captain
In Limbo
Immune
Quit
Re-entered the game
No vote
Eliminated

The Glas House voting history
	Week 1	Week 2	Week 3	Week 4	Week 5	Week 6	Week 7	Week 8		Week 9	Final Week		Limbo votes received
	Week 1	Week 2	Week 3	Week 4	Week 5	Week 6	Week 7	Temptation	Limbo Vote	Week 9	Day 66	Finale	Limbo votes received
Winning Captain	Jeffrey	Ashley	Ashley	Holly	Mike	Stephanie	Stephanie	None	Jeffrey	Jeffrey	Andrea	None	
Losing Captain	Jacob	Apollo	Robin	Ashley	Holly	Mike	Joy	None	Gene	Mike	None	None	
Losing team	Alex, Apollo, Ashley, Andrea, Erica, Gene	Erica, Gene, Holly; Mike, Robin	Andrea, Erica, Jeffrey, Mike, Stephanie	Andrea, Kevin; Mike, Stephanie	Andrea, Kevin, Stephanie	Andrea, Gene, Jeffrey	Andrea, Gene	None	Erica, Mike	Andrea, Erica, Kevin	Erica, Jeffrey, Kevin	None	
Kevin	Alex	Holly	Erica	Stephanie	Stephanie	Jeffrey	Gene	Declined offer	Mike	Erica	Limbo	Winner (Day 68)	8
Erica	Alex	Holly	Andrea	Kevin	Andrea	Jeffrey	Gene	Declined offer	Mike	Kevin	Saved	Runner-Up (Day 68)	14
Andrea	Alex	Holly	Erica	Stephanie	Stephanie	Jeffrey	Gene	Declined offer	Erica	Erica	Won; Challenge	Third Place (Day 68)	13
Jeffrey	Alex	Holly	Andrea	Kevin	Andrea	Jeffrey	Andrea	Declined offer	Erica	Kevin	Limbo	Eliminated (Day 66)	7
Mike	Alex	Holly	Erica	Stephanie	Stephanie	Losing; Captain	Eliminated (Day 44)		Erica	Erica	Re-eliminated (Day 65)		2
Gene	Alex	Holly	Andrea	Kevin	Kevin	Jeffrey	Andrea	Declined offer	Losing; Captain	Eliminated (Day 58)			3
Stephanie	Alex	Holly	Andrea	Kevin	Andrea	Jeffrey	Andrea	Accepted offer	Quit (Bribed) (Day 53)				7
Joy	Alex	Holly	Andrea	Kevin	Andrea	Jeffrey	Andrea	Eliminated (Day 51)					0
Holly	Erica	Erica	Erica	Stephanie	Losing; Captain	Eliminated (Day 37)							10
Ashley	Alex	Holly	Erica	Losing; Captain	Eliminated (Day 30)								2
Robin	Alex	Holly	Erica	Eliminated (Day 23)									0
Apollo	Ashley	Losing; Captain	Eliminated (Day 16)										0
Alex	Ashley	Eliminated (Day 9)											10
Jacob	Losing; Captain	Quit (Day 5)											0
Notes	1, 2	none	3	none			3	4		5, 3	6	7	
Voted Into Limbo	Alex	Holly	Erica	Kevin	Andrea	Jeffery	Andrea	None	Erica	Erica	None		
Limbo Vote	10-2-1	10-1	6-5	5-4	4-3-1	7-0	4-3	None	3-2	3-2	None		
In Limbo	Alex, ~~Jacob~~	Apollo, Holly	Erica, Robin	Ashley, Kevin	Andrea, Holly	Jeffrey, Mike	Andrea, Joy	Joy, Mike	Erica, Gene	Erica, Mike	Jeffrey, Kevin	Andrea; Erica; Kevin	
Quit	Jacob	none						Stephanie; Bribed $37,600	none				
Eliminated	Alex; More votes in favor to eliminate	Apollo; Fewest votes to stay	Robin; Fewest votes to stay	Ashley; Fewest votes to stay	Holly; Fewest votes to stay	Mike; 49% to stay	Joy; Fewest votes to stay	Mike; More Votes to re-enter	Gene; Fewest votes to stay	Mike; Fewest votes to stay	Jeffrey; Fewest votes to stay	Andrea; Fewest votes (out of three)	
Eliminated	Alex; More votes in favor to eliminate	Apollo; Fewest votes to stay	Robin; Fewest votes to stay	Ashley; Fewest votes to stay	Holly; Fewest votes to stay	Mike; 49% to stay	Joy; Fewest votes to stay	Mike; More Votes to re-enter	Gene; Fewest votes to stay	Mike; Fewest votes to stay	Jeffrey; Fewest votes to stay	Erica; Fewest votes (out of two)	
Eliminated	Alex; More votes in favor to eliminate	Apollo; Fewest votes to stay	Robin; Fewest votes to stay	Ashley; Fewest votes to stay	Holly; Fewest votes to stay	Mike; 49% to stay	Joy; Fewest votes to stay	Mike; More Votes to re-enter	Gene; Fewest votes to stay	Mike; Fewest votes to stay	Jeffrey; Fewest votes to stay	Kevin; Most votes to win	

Notes

- ^Note 1: During the first week, America voted for how the players should be split into teams for the first challenge (choosing between Old vs Young, Men vs Women or East vs West). Then each team then choose their team captain. America chose East vs West. Jeffery was the Captain of the East team, Jacob was the captain of the West team.
- ^Note 2: Jacob walked out after the reveal of limbo vote. Alex was still sent to limbo where America voted on if he should return. America voted to eliminate him.
- ^Note 3: As the House's Vote was tied, the losing team captain cast a tie-breaker vote.
- ^Note 4: On Day 53, the players were offered a bribe to immediately leave The Glass House. Should anyone take the bribe, Joy or Mike (as voted by America) would return to the house and be once again eligible to win. Stephanie accepted an offer of $37,600, and Mike was voted by America to return. He was ineligible to be voted to be a Team Captain that week, but was still able to be voted into Limbo by the players.
- ^Note 5: Mike received the fewest votes from America, thus being the first team captain for the week. Jeffrey was voted as the second team captain by the players themselves. The two competed in a challenge, where the winner would be the only member of the winning team and the loser will go into limbo as the losing captain.
- ^Note 6: America voted on which of three non-challenge winners would join Andrea in the Final 3. Erica received the most votes and was safe. Jeffrey and Kevin were sent to limbo where Jeffrey received the fewest votes and was eliminated.
- ^Note 7: For the finale, America voted for who they wanted to win The Glass House.

== Production ==
=== Broadcast and platforms ===
The first season of The Glass House featured ten episodes, which aired Monday's at 10 p.m. The aired episodes showed highlights of the previous week, and featured the nomination and eviction process. Aside from the weekly episodes, viewers could watch an uncensored live feed into the house at various days and times. On Monday's, the feeds were viewable from 11 p.m. to 3 a.m. the following day, while on Tuesday, Wednesday, and Thursday the feeds were viewable from 3 p.m. to 4 p.m. The first clip of the live feeds premiered on Tuesday, June 12, 2012. The show's first episode premiered on Monday, June 18, 2012, at 10 p.m. ET/PT on ABC in the United States. The tenth and final episode aired on Monday, August 20, 2012. Aside from the live feed and broadcast episodes, ABC also uploaded several unseen clips to the website of the contestants interacting with one another, similar to the 2011 edition of Big Brother in the United Kingdom.

=== Weekly episodes and live feeds ===
The show premiered on Monday, June 18 at 10 p.m. ET/PT on ABC in the United States. The first season of The Glass House featured ten episodes, which aired Mondays at 10 p.m. The airing episode showed highlights of the previous week, and featured the nomination and eviction process. Aside from the weekly episode, viewers can watch a live feed into the house at various days and times. On Mondays, the feeds were viewable from 11 p.m. to 3 a.m. the following day. Tuesday and Wednesday, the feeds would be viewed from 3 p.m. to 4 p.m. and 9 p.m. to 12 a.m. Thursday the feeds would be viewed from 3 p.m. to 4 p.m.

=== House ===
The exterior of the house is made completely of glass, as are most of the walls inside. The living room features a television, through which the Oracle contacts them. There is also a large red "cat climber" in the living room, which features seats for the contestants to use, each at a different elevation. There are also cream and lime green seats in the room. The kitchen features a counter that extends through most of the length of the room, and lime green and white stools are lined up with the counter. The bathroom features a marble floor, and a wall made almost completely of a mirror. The sinks are in the shape of bowls. Aside from the community bedrooms, there is also the "friend" and "enemy" bedrooms. The "friend" room features cream colored chairs and bedsheets, as well as two beds. The "enemies" room has a much darker feel, with red chairs mixed with red and black bed sheets. Like the "friend" bedroom, there are two beds, and the wall behind the beds has the appearance of paint being thrown at it, featuring orange, blue, and black colors. The house also features an indoor hot tub. On Day 3, a new room was revealed to the contestants and viewers, which has the appearance of a backyard.

=== America's vote ===
Besides choosing whom to eliminate from the game, viewers were given several options that affected the game. A pre-season poll allowed voters to choose where contestants sleep, their food for the first night, and how the first competition was split up. A "favorite player" poll was posted on the website, in which viewers could select as many contestants as they want and choose them as their favorite. During the live feeds, viewers asked several questions which they will answer live. On the first live feed episode contestants had to guess how the majority of viewers answered the questions, but the following day the public were allowed to choose what the contestants did during the live feed. In a similar fashion, the viewers also chose what rooms the contestants slept in and could even influence their everyday life such as forcing them to talk with a British accent for 24 hours or walking backwards for 24 hours.

=== Competitions ===
Weekly, players will split into two teams and compete to stay in the game. The competitions will vary from physical to mental, and will result in two members of the losing team being sent to limbo. Aside from these competitions, the group also performs various tasks during the live feeds, and have played games such as "Guess the Sketch", and a game which required them to figure out how the majority of viewers answered questions. The final competition of the first season featured the Final Four competing for individual immunity, with the challenge winner earning a spot in the Final Three.

=== Pre-season ===
The Glass House was created by Kenny Rosen, who also serves as the show's writer. Rosen had become notable due to his work as a producer on various reality television series, including Hell's Kitchen and the first seven seasons of reality series Big Brother. Contestants could audition on the official ABC website, and had to be 21 years of age or older. The Glass House was first announced on April 30, 2012, along with its June 18 premiere date. On May 4, 2012, broadcasting company CBS warned ABC not to air The Glass House due to its strong similarities to the CBS reality television series Big Brother, in which a group of contestants, referred to as HouseGuest, live in a house while constantly being monitored by cameras and microphones. CBS stated in the letter sent to ABC President Anne Sweeney that they would seek legal action if ABC went forward with the airing of The Glass House. CBS also criticized the fact that The Glass House was being produced by at least nineteen former producers and staff from Big Brother, including Corie Henson, Kenny Rosen, and Mike O'Sullivan. On May 10, 2012, CBS went forward with a lawsuit against ABC. CBS has stated numerous times that they were attempting to get the show's premiere halted, however, the show is still set to air. The fourteen contestants for the series were revealed on June 4, 2012, on the official ABC website. The initial cast for the season featured a 31-year-old woman named Melissa, but days after the contestants were announced, Melissa was removed from The Glass House's official website, and was replaced with 21-year-old Holly. ABC has yet to confirm why Melissa was removed from the show. Voting for the show began on June 9, and allowed the public to choose bedrooms for the contestants, as well as food they would eat on their first night, and whether to have a pool party or pajama party, and how the first challenge should be split up; men vs. women, old contestants vs. young contestants, or east vs. west. ABC officially released pictures of the house on June 11, 2012 on their official website.

== Ratings and reception ==
The show originally began in June 2012. The show was met with criticism and low ratings, though its critical reception improved over time. Following the performance of the first season, a second season was seen as doubtful. Producer Steve Booth hinted that a second season was possible, posting on his official Twitter: "No word on a Season 2 yet. But rumor has it... Probably won't know for sure until next spring". Executive producer Kenny Rosen also stated that a change of format may be in the works, and hinted at the possibility of the most neutral players being the Team Captains, as to keep the big personalities in the game for a while. The show was officially cancelled by ABC producers on May 29, 2013, almost a year after the show premiered.

During the 10 o'clock hour, the series premiere of The Glass House ranked #2 in the slot with Adults 18-49 and #1 with Women 18-49. The Glass House boosted its time period week to week by 60% in Adults 18-49, hitting a summer-high for ABC in the hour. Despite the added publicity surrounding the legal action, The Glass House was the lowest-rated of six reality shows on network television Monday night, and was able to beat only repeat programming on CBS. The show also seemed to drive viewers away throughout its hour-long running time, falling about 20 percent from its first half hour to its second, losing about a million viewers in the process, and dissipating the lead-in audience handed to it from the more successful Bachelorette. Over all, The Glass House averaged only about four million viewers for the hour, and a 1.5 rating in the audience preferred by ABC advertisers, viewers between the ages of 18 and 49. Critically, the series received generally negative reviews. Entertainment Weekly gave the premiere episode a negative review, and even mocked the opening, commenting "'The show they didn't want you to see' was the show you didn't need to watch." The second episode dropped down to 3.09 million viewers with a 1.1 rating, and then again to 2.840 million viewers and a 1.0 rating share the next week. The seventh episode dropped down to 1.60 million viewers with a 0.6 rating, the 8th episode also had a drop in viewers having been watched by 1.59 million viewers, the 9 and 10th episode had a small spike in ratings, but not as much as the show had gotten the first half of the season with the series finale reaching just under 2 million viewers.

#	Airdate	18-49 (Rating/Share)	Viewers (millions)	Source
1	June 18, 2012	1.5/4	3.98	
2	June 25, 2012	1.1/3	3.09	
3	July 2, 2012	1.0/3	2.84	
4	July 9, 2012	1.0/3	2.80	
5	July 16, 2012	0.8/3	2.35	
6	July 23, 2012	0.8/2	2.28	
7	July 30, 2012	0.6/1	1.60	
8	August 6, 2012	0.6/2	1.59	
9	August 13, 2012	0.7/2	1.87	
10	August 20, 2012	0.7/2	1.99	

=== CBS lawsuit ===
On May 4, 2012, CBS issued a letter to ABC threatening legal action over The Glass House, as the format had strong similarities to its own series Big Brother, and that its production staff contained at least 18 members who had previously worked on Big Brother and were "privy to trade secrets and other confidential, proprietary information and signed broad and binding nondisclosure agreements" in relation to the format. On May 10, 2012, CBS went forward with a lawsuit against ABC, and sought a restraining order to halt the series' premiere.

Gary Allen Feess of the District Court for the Central District of California declined the request, arguing that it would unduly harm ABC's investment in producing the series, that elements of the format CBS claimed to be infringing were "generic" and not inherently novel, that production techniques were not considered intellectual property, and many of the claimed production techniques were actually common industry practices.

On August 17, 2012, CBS dismissed its lawsuit against ABC, citing the series' poor ratings. However, the network continued to pursue arbitration cases against several executives for their misappropriation of intellectual property related to the Big Brother format. In August 2013, CBS reached a settlement with ABC.
