= Ray Hamlett =

American politician

Member of the U.S. House of Representatives from Missouri's 48th district

Missouri House of Representatives
- Incumbent
- Assumed office 1975

Personal details
- Born: 1933 Mexico, Missouri
- Died: 1998 (aged 64–65)
- Party: Democratic
- Spouse: Ruby M. Summers
- Children: 1 son
- Occupation: real estate and insurance businessman

James Ray Hamlett (March 10, 1933 - 1998) was a Democratic politician who served in the Missouri House of Representatives. He was born in Mexico, Missouri, and was educated in Vandalia public schools. On November 20, 1956, he married Ruby M. Summers in Laddonia, Missouri. His wife Ruby Hamlett was first woman in Missouri to hold the office of President of the Missouri Banker's Association. Their son became an attorney in Mexico, Missouri, while their daughter-in-law became an associate circuit court judge.
