= Hamlet, Alberta =

Locality in Alberta, Canada

Coordinates: 51.16682°N 113.23522°W

Hamlet is a locality in Alberta, Canada.

The community has the name of William Hamlet, a railroad official.
