= Hamlet, West Virginia =

Hamlet
- Unincorporated community
- Location within the state of West Virginia Hamlet (the United States)
- Coordinates: 37°49′41″N 81°0′3″W
- Country: United States
- State: West Virginia
- County: Raleigh
- Elevation: 1,250 ft (380 m)
- Time zone: UTC-5 (Eastern (EST))
  - Summer (DST): UTC-4 (EDT)
- GNIS ID: 1742778

Hamlet was an unincorporated community in Raleigh County, West Virginia.

The community was so named on account of its small size.
