= Hamlet, California =

Unincorporated community in California, United States

Hamlet
- Unincorporated community
- Location in California Hamlet (the United States)
- Coordinates: 38°12′28″N 122°55′32″W
- Country: United States
- State: California
- County: Marin
- Elevation: 23 ft (7 m)

Hamlet (also Telmat) is an unincorporated community in Marin County, California, United States. It is located on the northeastern shore of Tomales Bay and the Northwestern Pacific Railroad, 3 miles (4.8 km) south-southwest of Tomales, at an elevation of 23 feet (7 m).

A post office operated at Hamlet from 1876 to 1886. The Telmat post office operated from 1917 to 1931.

The land on which Hamlet was initially built was purchased in 1862 by Edwin Moore, who in turn sold the land to Samuel Nowlin, who in his turn sold the land to John Hamlet in 1870, a dairyman originally from Tennessee. The area became known as Hamlet at this time. Soon after, in 1874, the North Pacific Coast Railroad was built to Hamlet. The town initially was centered on dairying and potato farming, but oyster farming soon became a major economic activity, and oyster and herring packing facilities opened in 1917. The facilities did not last long, but oyster farming remained a significant part of the economy until heavy storms in 1982 caused the oyster beds to silt in. Since then, tourism has been the major industry in the area.
