= Hamlet (name) =

Hamlet is both a masculine given name and a surname. Derivative versions of the name are Gamlet (Russian: Гамлет), Hamnet in English, and Hamelin in French.

Notable people with the name include:

== Given name ==
- Hamlet Barrientos (born 1978), Bolivian footballer
- Hamlet Gonashvili (1928–1985), Georgian singer
- Hamlet Handley (1873–1918), English footballer
- Hamlet Isakhanli (born 1948), Azerbaijani mathematician and writer
- Hamlet Manukyan (born 2007), Armenian artistic gymnast
- Hamlet Mkhitaryan (footballer, born 1973), Armenian footballer
- Hamlet Mkhitaryan (footballer, born 1962), Armenian Soviet footballer
- Hamlet Watling (1818–1908), English antiquarian
- Hamlet Winstanley (1698–1756), English painter and engraver

== Surname ==
- Douglas Hamlet (died 1995), Saint Vincent and the Grenadines murderer
- Harry G. Hamlet (1874–1954), Commandant of the United States Coast Guard
- Norm Hamlet, American guitarist
- Bobby W. Hamlet, US Navy Veteran
- Ryan D. Hamlet, US Army Veteran

== Fictional characters ==
- Prince Hamlet, protagonist of Shakespeare's tragedy Hamlet

== See also ==
- Gamlet Siukayev (born 1981), Russian footballer
