= Malicious castration =

Criminal offence consisting of the intentional maiming of another person

Malicious castration is a common law criminal offense consisting of the intentional maiming of another person's genitalia. It is law 14–28 in the state of North Carolina in the United States.

== North Carolina law ==
The state of North Carolina defines malicious castration:

If any person, of malice aforethought, shall unlawfully castrate any other person, or cut off, maim or disfigure any of the privy members of any person, with intent to murder, maim, disfigure, disable or render impotent such person, the person so offending shall be punished as a Class C felon.

== North Carolina cases ==
- In 2006 Rebecca Arnold Dawson was charged with malicious castration for maiming the genitals of a man with her hands. The man needed 50 stitches.
- Martinne Delavega claimed self defense in a September 2015 attack on her boyfriend. She had bit his scrotum. She was acquitted in 2018.
- In September 2019 Victoria Thomas Frabutt used a pruning shears to cut off her husband's penis. She is awaiting trial.
- In August 2019 Candace Grantham was charged with malicious castration. She is awaiting trial.

== See also ==
- Lorena Bobbitt
- Bertha Boronda
- Brigitte Harris case
- Catherine Kieu
- Emasculation
- Francine Hughes and The Burning Bed
- Genital modification and mutilation
- Law and Order, Season 4, Episode 17 "Mayhem"
- Lin and Xie case
- Penectomy
- Penis removal
- Penis transplantation
- Sada Abe
