= Catherine Kieu =

American criminal (born 1963)

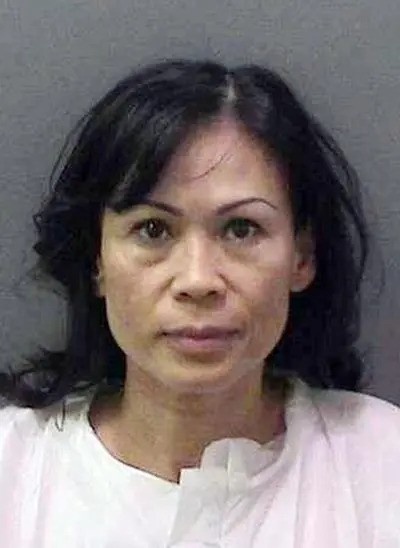
- Mug shot of Kieu in 2011
- Born: March 10, 1963 (age 63); South Vietnam
- Other names: Catherine Kieu Becker, Que Anh Tran
- Spouse: "Glen" (Note: The husband's name only given in court documents as "Glen" and was not otherwise reported.)
- Status: Incarcerated
- Convictions: Torture; Aggravated mayhem
- Criminal charges: False imprisonment; Assault with a deadly weapon; Aggravated mayhem; Poisoning; Administering a drug with intent to commit a felony; Spousal abuse
- Penalty: Life imprisonment with possibility of parole after 7 years

Details
- Victims: 1
- Date: July 11, 2011
- Injured: 1
- Date apprehended: 2011
- Imprisoned at: the Central California Women's Facility since 2013

Catherine Kieu (born March 10, 1963), also known as Catherine Kieu Becker, is an American woman who was convicted of torture and aggravated mayhem in 2013 for mutilating her husband's genitalia. The couple had been in the process of getting a divorce, but had continued to share their condominium. During the trial, the prosecution argued that Kieu assaulted her husband because he had re-established a relationship with an ex-girlfriend of his; the defense argued it was because of sexual and emotional abuse.

== Overview ==
Kieu was accused of drugging her husband, waiting for him to wake up, cutting off his penis with a 10-inch kitchen knife, and putting it in a garbage disposal to prevent reattachment on July 11, 2011. Kieu called the police after the incident. When they arrived her husband was in bed, bleeding and tied down. He had emergency surgery at UC Irvine Medical Center, and was released, but did not have his penis reattached. He is able to urinate, but unable to have sexual intercourse. He stated at trial that as a result of the assault and permanent injury to his genitalia, he felt as if he had been murdered.

The responding police had not determined a clear motive for Kieu's actions, but Kieu's husband filed for divorce in May, 2011, and the couple remained together in their Garden Grove condominium. KTLA reported that they were married December 29, 2009 and had been married 16 months. (Note: Initially, the couple were reported to have been married 11 1/2 years,) Kieu was charged with false imprisonment, assault with a deadly weapon, aggravated mayhem, poisoning, administering a drug with intent to commit a felony, and spousal abuse. She was held in an Orange County, California jail on a $1 million bond. (Note: In July 2011, she was reported by the International Business Times to be 48 and her victim, 51. KTLA reported in April, 2013 that the wife and husband were 50 and 60, respectively. Huffington Post also reported that Kieu's husband was 60 years of age in 2013.)

== Trial ==
The case went to trial in April 2013 and Kieu was indicted of torture and aggravated mayhem. She pleaded not guilty. During the trial, the prosecution alleged that Kieu committed the crime because her husband had re-established a relationship with an ex-girlfriend and filed for divorce. Frank Bittar, her public defender, argued that Kieu had been subjected to sexual and verbal abuse. During her childhood in Vietnam, Kieu had been subjected to molestation and other abuse. Bittar stated that Kieu's husband "demanded sex in ways that caused her pain" and that his client had "a break from reality" when she committed the crime. A voice activated recorder captured the event on July 11, 2011 and the audio recording was replayed in the courtroom; Kieu yelled, "You deserve it!" three times before assaulting her husband.

Deputy District Attorney John Christl told reporters: "This woman went to extreme lengths to destroy this man's manhood by placing it in the garbage disposal. She did this out of vengeance, vanity and jealousy."

She was found guilty on April 29, 2013 of both torture and aggravated mayhem. She was sentenced on June 28, 2013, and received life in prison with the possibility of parole after seven years. As of March 2026, she is 63 years old and has already been denied parole twice, most recently in September 2025, and is imprisoned at the Central California Women's Facility. Her initial suitability hearing took place in September 2022. At this hearing, she was denied parole for the first time, with a three-year denial period. Her second hearing occurred on September 3, 2025. At this subsequent suitability hearing, the Board found her unsuitable for release again and issued a further 3-year denial. Due to the 3-year denial, her next scheduled opportunity for a parole hearing will be in late 2028. However, there are several factors which include Catherine's advanced age, the Parole Board's lengthened parole denial of 3 more years which often means that the Board believes such an inmate has moved further away from (not closer) to rehabilitation, and the overall serious nature of her convictions, which all suggests that she faces a high probability of spending the rest of her life in prison.

== Discussion on The Talk ==
Sharon Osbourne and other co-hosts joked about the incident and made light of Kieu's crimes on the daytime television show The Talk. Regarding the incident, Osbourne said "I don't know the circumstances... However, I do think it's quite fabulous." Co-host Sara Gilbert said "it is a little bit sexist. If somebody cut a woman's breast off, nobody would be sitting laughing."

== See also ==
- Bertha Boronda
- Brigitte Harris case
- Emasculation
- Francine Hughes and The Burning Bed
- Lin and Xie case
- Penectomy
- Penis removal
- Penis transplantation
- Sada Abe
- Carlos Castro (journalist)
- John and Lorena Bobbitt
