= Bertha Boronda =

American criminal (1877–1950)

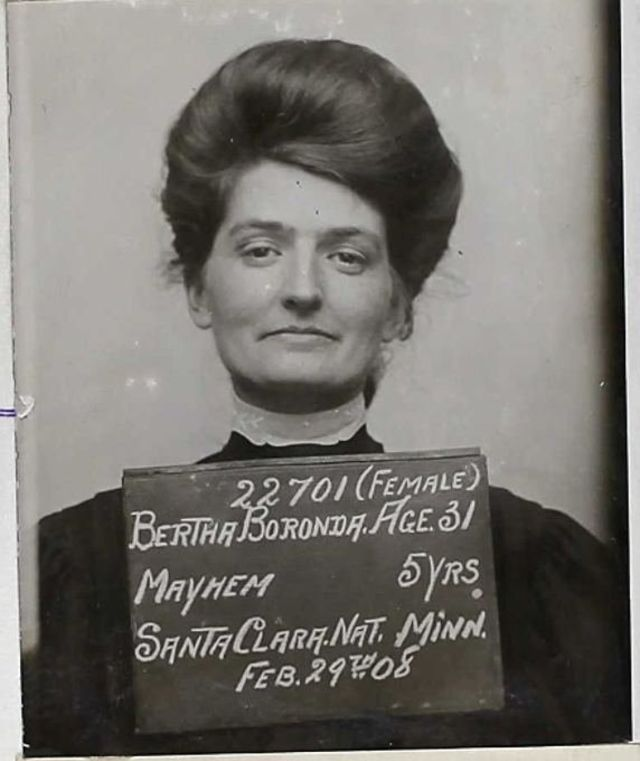
- Bertha Boronda's 1908 photo after conviction
- Born: Bertha Zettle; March 14, 1877; Minnesota, U.S.
- Died: January 18, 1950 (aged 72); San Francisco County, California, U.S.
- Spouse: Mario Narcisso "Frank" Boronda
- Status: Released
- Motive: Vengeance
- Conviction: Mayhem
- Criminal charge: Mayhem
- Penalty: 5 years

Details
- Victims: 1
- Date: May 30, 1907
- Injured: 1
- Weapon: Straight razor

Bertha Boronda (née Zettle; March 14, 1877 – January 18, 1950) was an American woman who sliced off her husband's penis with a straight razor in 1907. (Note: The exact extent of the injury is disputed and controversial. Some suggest there was a cut; others say a removal. Cf., "Then, in the 1940s, during one of the many courthouse remodels, Clyde Arbuckle was called to inspect what someone called a “dungeon” in the basement area. While there, Clyde was shown a cupboard containing exhibits of past trials. Listed as exhibit A was a glass jar with a shriveled-up organ the size of an old prune preserved in formaldehyde—all that remained of Frank Baronda and the famous trial.") She fled the scene of the crime, but was captured the next day. Boronda was tried, convicted of mayhem, and imprisoned at San Quentin Penitentiary.

== Crime ==
The victim was Bertha Boronda's husband, Frank Boronda: Captain of Chemical Engine No. 1 with the San Jose Fire Department. On Friday, May 30, 1907, Bertha insisted that her husband Frank had visited a place of prostitution. Shortly after midnight, she cut her husband's penis off with a razor while in bed. He was able to go to the firehouse, which was adjacent to his home, and received treatment in a hospital.

=== Capture ===
She was apprehended while disguised, wearing men's clothing and mounting a bicycle to make her escape. She was not found by police until more than 24 hours had passed. After her capture, Boronda admitted her crime and expressed no regret.

The newspaper reports were tactfully non-specific. "'She drew a razor and cut her husband.' Then she walked to her nephew's room and simply stated, 'Frank cut himself.'"

On June 1, Frank Boronda made a complaint to Justice Brown from his hospital bed at the Red Cross Hospital. Boronda was accused of mayhem. The felony of mayhem, punishable by up to 14 years in prison, was defined by Section 204 of the criminal code: "Every person who unlawfully and maliciously deprives a human being of a member of his body or renders it useless, or cuts or disables the tongue, nose, ear or lip, is guilty of mayhem."

Boronda was held on $10,000 bond ($335,750 in 2025).

== Trial ==
Mr. Boronda testified at the trial that he and his wife had visited the San Jose theater, and that the attack was unprovoked. He claimed that she was amorous and had invited him to her bed before the attack. The prosecution's theory was that this was a deliberate planned attack in furtherance of a jealous rage.

=== Defense ===
Boronda had several defenses, chief among them being her complete lack of any recollection of the night in question. She claimed she became enraged at her husband, and the two had an argument because she thought he was going to leave her. She admitted that she maimed him, but expressed no regret. As reported in the Santa Cruz Sentinel, "Her only excuse is that she wanted to be revenged on Boronda, who she believed intended to desert her and leave for Mexico." Another defense was that Mr. Boronda had made "a vile request."

At the trial she settled on a defense of "emotional insanity" from extreme jealousy. She took the stand in her defense and explained why she dressed like a man when she fled after the incident. She stated that her husband had been gone for two weeks; and she often wore her brother's clothing when she spied on her husband.

== Sentence ==
The jury deliberated two hours before convicting her. Boronda was sentenced to five years in prison, but served only two and was released from prison on December 20, 1909.

== Personal life ==
Bertha Zettle was born in 1877 to German immigrants in Minnesota. She married Frank Boronda (born Mario Narcisso Boronda in 1863) in 1901. He was a Mexican American captain with the San Jose Fire Department.

In the aftermath of the incident, Bertha and Frank Boronda divorced. Both Frank and Bertha later remarried. Bertha married Alexander Patterson in 1921; however, the two eventually divorced.

Her remains are interred at Calvary Catholic Cemetery in San Jose, California.

== See also ==
- Brigitte Harris case
- Carlos Castro
- Catherine Kieu
- Emasculation
- Francine Hughes and The Burning Bed
- Genital modification and mutilation
- Law and Order, Season 4, Episode 17 "Mayhem"
- Lin and Xie case
- Lorena Bobbitt
- Penectomy
- Penis removal
- Penis transplantation
- Sada Abe
