= Lin and Xie case =

Chinese criminal incident

The Lin and Xie case is an incident of a woman cutting off her husband's penis that took place in Dongguan, Guangzhou, People's Republic of China in 2009. A family couple with husband Lin Mouru (林某儒, Mandarin: Lín Mǒurú, Jyutping: lam4 mau5 jyu4) and wife Xie Mouman (Simplified: 谢某曼, Traditional: 謝某曼, Mandarin: Xiè Mǒumàn, Jyutping: ze6 mau5 maan6) were in a decade-long marriage. One day, husband Lin brought home a mistress, and requested that they have a threesome and live together. His wife Xie completely disagreed with the idea, and wanted a divorce. After a confrontational dispute, Xie cut off her husband's penis. The Dongguan court sentenced her to prison for 10 years.

== Incident ==
Xie Mouman (37 years old in 2009) is originally from Xinyi, Guangdong. In 1997 the couple married. They have three children, aged 8–11 in 2009. In December 2008 Lin told his wife he had a mistress and he suggested they all live together in the same household.

On February 24, 2009 Xie asked for a divorce, but Lin refused. The couple argued for five hours. Xie alleged that he hit her multiple times and threatened to choke her and their three children to death. Two days later on February 26, 2009, Xie bought a pair of scissors from a grocery store. She cut his penis off while he was sleeping. Xie escaped from her home and ended up in Wanjiang District, Dongguan. She was captured by the public security bureau (公安机关) two days later.

== Aftermath ==
On July 27, 2009 Dongguan court sentenced Xie to 10 years in prison.

== See also ==
- Sada Abe
- John and Lorena Bobbitt
- Bertha Boronda
- Emasculation
- Francine Hughes and The Burning Bed
- Genital modification and mutilation
- Brigitte Harris case
- Catherine Kieu
- Penectomy
- Penis removal
- Penis transplantation
