= Brigitte Harris case =

American woman and sexual abuse victim convicted of manslaughter

Brigitte Harris
- Born: June 6, 1981 (age 45); Staten Island, New York, U.S.
- Occupation: Former JFK Airport security guard
- Status: Incarcerated at the Bedford Hills Correctional Facility for Women. Released on August 13, 2012.
- Conviction: Second-degree manslaughter
- Penalty: 5 to 15 years in prison

Brigitte Harris (born June 6, 1981) is an American woman from Queens, New York, who was convicted of manslaughter in the killing and castration of her father, Eric Goodridge, in her Rockaway apartment in 2007. Both Harris and her sister, Carleen Goodridge, claimed to have been raped and sexually abused by their father since childhood. Due to her abuse allegations, Brigitte received an outpouring of support from public figures including U.S. Senator Chuck Schumer and state senators Diane Savino and Eric Adams. Harris was sentenced to five to fifteen years in prison, but was released after serving three years.

== Early life ==
Brigitte Harris was born on June 6, 1981, in Staten Island, New York, to Liberian immigrant parents. She lived in an apartment in Park Hill with her mother until age 2, at which point she was abandoned by her mother and subsequently moved in with her father, Eric Goodridge, in Bay Shore, Long Island. When her father later moved back to his home country, Brigitte moved around with relatives. Harris reports being physically abused by her grandmother and sexually abused by a cousin. During a family trip to Liberia, Harris confronted her mother about the abuse at Eric's hands, but Eric denied the allegations and claimed that his daughter was mentally ill. Harris moved out at age 17 and, at the time of the incident, was working as a security guard at John F. Kennedy International Airport.

== Crime ==
After several years of estrangement from her father, Harris was contacted by her sister, Carleen Goodridge, who claimed that Eric wanted to talk to them. When Harris arrived, she saw one of her nieces sitting on Eric's lap, leading to an argument with Carleen considering his past abuse of the sisters when they were children. Eric informed Harris that he had decided to take his granddaughters with him back to Liberia against their will.

On July 28, 2007, Harris confronted Eric in her Rockaway apartment and attempted to convince him not to take the girls. After the conversation became heated, Harris handcuffed her father to a chair, gagged him with a towel to prevent him from screaming, and throttled him to death. She also cut off his penis using a scalpel; investigators believed that he was already dead when this happened. She later threw the severed penis under the Rockaway Boardwalk in Far Rockaway. Upon dialing 9-1-1 and informing the operator of Eric's condition, Harris claimed that she was on her way to the police station, but never showed up. Instead, she contacted Carleen and told her what she had done; Carleen advised her to come to her home instead of turning herself in. When Harris arrived, Carleen called an ambulance. After seeing Harris with the scalpel in hand and still in shock, the sisters decided to check Harris into the Richmond University Medical Center psychiatric ward.

Carleen hired defense attorney Arthur L. Aidala to represent Harris, who subsequently told him about the sexual abuse she and her sister suffered by Eric. She explained how, in some African cultures, fathers are entitled to take their daughters' virginity: "He said he was doing it because he loves me and that is how fathers show love to their daughters," Brigitte said. Carleen admitted that she was sexually abused by Eric as well but had been too afraid to say anything. She set up a website called savebridget.com to raise money for her sister's legal defense.

Ultimately Aidala, a highly respected attorney who normally charges a top fee, believed in Brigitte Harris's case so strongly that he took it on pro bono and even persuaded experts who testified in her defense to waive their fees as well.

=== Investigation ===
After being discharged from the psychiatric ward on August 16, 2007, Harris was charged with second-degree murder and first-degree manslaughter and was held at Rikers Island. Harris, who had referred to herself as "Lady Vengeance" and "The Original Dark Angel" on her MySpace page, claimed that she had not intended to kill her father. "I felt that I had to stop him," "take away his weapon".

== Trial ==
Two years after her arraignment for second-degree murder, Harris went to trial in September 2009. Testifying in her own defense, Harris stated that she had researched the 1993 castration case of John and Lorena Bobbitt. Prosecutors maintained that Harris' actions towards her father showed premeditation. Harris argued that her motive for the killing was not revenge, but an act to prevent Goodridge from taking his granddaughters to Liberia and likely molesting them.

On September 30, 2009, the jury found Harris guilty of the lesser included offense of second-degree manslaughter. One juror reported that, "None of us felt that she deserved to get any murder charges or anything. So we decided on second-degree manslaughter." Despite jury letters, Queens Supreme Court Judge Arthur Cooperman sentenced Harris to the maximum of five to fifteen years in prison. After serving three years, she was released on parole on August 13, 2012.

=== Aftermath ===
Harris has reiterated that she did not intend to kill her father, and expressed a desire to work with the advocacy group STEPS to End Family Violence when she was released from prison. Her case was profiled on the Oxygen Network series Snapped in November 2010. The program features interviews from Harris, her attorney, Arthur L. Aidala, and her supporters. Her case was later profiled on the Investigation Discovery (ID) program Deadly Women in the episode "Parents' Peril". Her case was also profiled on the TV One program Payback, with Harris's name serving as the eponymous title of the first season's second episode.

== See also ==
- Sada Abe
- Bertha Boronda
- John and Lorena Bobbitt
- Emasculation
- Francine Hughes and The Burning Bed
- Genital modification and mutilation
- Catherine Kieu
- Lin and Xie case
- Penectomy
- Penis removal
