= Little Emma =

- Theatrical release poster
- Directed by: Leo Lewis Liao, Isabella Blanco
- Written by: Sean Lamb, Alice Blehart, Roger Chen
- Produced by: Roger Qing Chen, Adam Chiu, Allen Tsang
- Starring: Natalie Grace, Travis Cloer, Niko Gerentes, Amy Margolis, Marissa Pistone, Valerian Ruminski
- Music by: Daniel Markovich
- Production companies: Gold Valley Films, Toonz Media Group
- Distributed by: Viva Kids (US)
- Release date: 2024
- Running time: 80–106 minutes
- Countries: China, Ireland, United States
- Language: English

Little Emma is a 2024 animated adventure film directed by Leo Lewis Liao and Isabella Blanco. The film was produced by Gold Valley Films in collaboration with Toonz Media Group and premiered internationally in 2024. It tells the story of a tiny human girl raised by animals who embarks on a journey to discover her origins.

== Plot ==
Emma, a miniature human raised by forest animals, grows curious about her real identity. With help from Newton, a resourceful turtle, and Edward, a determined scientist, she travels to a secret island where she meets a society of tiny humans. Along the way, she uncovers surprising truths about her past and faces a decision about where she truly belongs.

== Voice cast ==
- Natalie Grace as Emma
- Travis Cloer as Edward Wolff
- Niko Gerentes as Sancho / Mr White / Bear
- Amy Margolis as Mrs White / Jude Cat
- Marissa Pistone as The Queen
- Valerian Ruminski as Bird / Moose
- Bar Topaz as Newton

== Production ==
Little Emma was introduced at the 2023 European Film Market by Gold Valley Films as part of their expanding slate of family-oriented animated features. The film was co-produced with India-based Toonz Media Group, who announced a broader six-picture partnership with Gold Valley ahead of the Cannes Marché du Film.

The story was crafted by Roger Qing Chen, Sean Lamb, and Alice Blehart, with animation by Neko Productions. Daniel Markovich composed the original score.

== Release ==
The film was showcased at major industry markets including EFM and Cannes. In May 2024, it was announced that Viva Kids had acquired North American distribution rights, with a U.S. theatrical release scheduled for later in the year.

== Reception ==
Early reviews noted the film’s heartfelt narrative and unique visual aesthetic. One reviewer compared its themes to Minuscule and Epic, praising the imaginative world-building and character depth.
