= Law of North Carolina =

The law of North Carolina consists of several levels, including constitutional, statutory, regulatory, case law, and local law.

== Sources ==
The Constitution of North Carolina is the foremost source of state law. Legislation is enacted by the General Assembly, published in the North Carolina Session Laws, and codified in the North Carolina General Statutes. State agency regulations (sometimes called administrative law) are published in the North Carolina Register and codified in the North Carolina Administrative Code. North Carolina's legal system is based on common law, which is interpreted by case law through the decisions of the Supreme Court and Court of Appeals, which are published in the North Carolina Reports and North Carolina Court of Appeals Reports, respectively. Counties, cities, towns, and villages may also promulgate local ordinances.

=== Constitution ===
North Carolina has had three constitutions, adopted in 1776, 1868, and 1971, respectively. Like the federal constitution does for the federal government, the North Carolina Constitution both provides for the structure of the North Carolina government and enumerates rights which the North Carolina government may not infringe.

Because "[t]the North Carolina Constitution expresses the will of the people of [the] State," it is "the supreme law of the land." "If there is a conflict between" a state statute and the North Carolina Constitution, the constitution controls because it "is the superior rule of law in that situation." The Supreme Court of North Carolina has the “power and . . . duty to determine whether challenged acts of the General Assembly violate the constitution,” by “constru[ing] and appl[ying] the provisions of” that document “with finality.” To determine whether a statute violates the North Carolina Constitution, a court looks to the text and “historical context” of the “applicable constitutional provision” and subsequent court decisions interpreting that text and history. Laws passed by the General Assembly are presumptively constitutional and will be held unconstitutional only when “the constitutional violation is plain and clear.”

=== Regulations ===
Pursuant to certain statutes, state agencies have promulgated regulations, also known as administrative law. The North Carolina Register includes information about state agency rules, administrative rules, executive orders and other notices, and is published bimonthly. The State of North Carolina Administrative Code (NCAC) contains all the rules adopted by the state agencies and occupational licensing boards in North Carolina. Both are compiled and published by the Rules Division of the North Carolina Office of Administrative Hearings.

=== Case law ===
The legal system of North Carolina is based on the common law. Like all U.S. states except Louisiana, North Carolina has a reception statute providing for the "reception" of English law. All statutes, regulations, and ordinances are subject to judicial review. Pursuant to common law tradition, the courts of North Carolina have developed a large body of case law through the decisions of the North Carolina Supreme Court and North Carolina Court of Appeals.

The decisions of the Supreme Court and Court of Appeals are published in the North Carolina Reports and North Carolina Court of Appeals Reports, respectively. Opinions are first published online on filing day as slip opinions, and may be withdrawn or corrected until the mandate issues 20 days later. Slip opinions are then printed with headnotes and other finding aids in soft-bound books called Advance Sheets and online, and are given citations to the official reports. Advance sheets are then compiled and printed in the hard-bound volumes of the North Carolina Reports and North Carolina Court of Appeals Reports, respectively. Trial court opinions are often neither written nor published.

=== Local ordinances ===
Local governments are created by acts of the General Assembly, which define their boundaries and approve their charters. These charters can be changed by legislative action or, in certain cases, by home rule amendments adopted by the local governments. Local government charters and legislative amendments can be found in the North Carolina Session Laws, and all home rule changes must be filed with the Secretary of State and the Legislative Library.

== See also ==
=== Topics ===
- Capital punishment in North Carolina
- Gambling in North Carolina
- Gun laws in North Carolina
- LGBT rights in North Carolina
- Malicious castration law in North Carolina

=== Other ===
- Politics of North Carolina
- Law enforcement in North Carolina
- Crime in North Carolina
- Law of the United States
