= General mayhem =

General mayhem can refer to:

- More than one act of mayhem.
- General Mayhem (G.I. Joe), a G.I. Joe: A Real American Hero character.
- General Mayhem, a V.I.L.E. agent from the Carmen Sandiego franchise.
- General Sweet Mayhem, an antagonist in The Lego Movie 2: The Second Part
