= Good American Family =

American anthology series on Hulu

- Promotional poster
- Genre: True crime Anthology; Drama
- Created by: Katie Robbins
- Showrunners: Katie Robbins; Sarah Sutherland
- Starring: Ellen Pompeo; Mark Duplass; Imogen Faith Reid; Patrick Schwarzenegger; Isabela Merced
- Composer: Marcelo Zarvos
- Country of origin: United States
- Original language: English
- No. of seasons: 1
- No. of episodes: 8

Production
- Executive producers: Erin Levy; Niles Kirchner; Mike Epps; Andrew Stearn; Dan Spilo; Ellen Pompeo; Laura Holstein; Sarah Sutherland; Katie Robbins; Liz Garbus (pilot)
- Cinematography: Carmen Cabana; Jim Denault; Paula Huidobro
- Editors: Amber Bansak; David Bilow; Aleshka Ferrero; C. Chi Yoon Chung; Taichi Erskine
- Production companies: 20th Television; Babka Pictures; Calamity Jane; Andrew Stearn Productions; Naptown Productions; Industry Entertainment Partners

Original release
- Network: Hulu
- Release: March 19, 2025 – present

Good American Family is an American true crime drama anthology series for Hulu. It premiered on March 19, 2025. Following the success, the show was renewed for a second season in August 2026, although it was originally billed as a miniseries.

== Premise ==
The first season is based on the adoption by Kristine (Ellen Pompeo) and Michael Barnett (Mark Duplass) of Natalia Grace (Imogen Faith Reid), a child with dwarfism whom the Barnetts decide to abandon after she starts to display peculiar behavior, falsely claiming she had been an adult pretending to be a child to justify doing so.

The second season is based on the case of John and Lorena Bobbitt that became a headline for a media circus, due to John's penis removal by Lorena in 1993. Later, she stated that it was due to the psychological, physical and sexual abuse by her husband.

== Cast and characters ==
=== Season 1 ===
==== Main ====
- Ellen Pompeo as Kristine Barnett, Natalia's adoptive mother
- Mark Duplass as Michael Barnett, Natalia's adoptive father
- Imogen Faith Reid as Natalia Grace, a 7-year-old girl with dwarfism

==== Recurring ====
- Sarayu Blue as Valika, a parent of one of the kids at Kristine's daycare
- Dulé Hill as Brandon Drysdale, a detective investigating the Barnetts for criminal allegations
- Jenny O'Hara as Almeda
- Kim Shaw as Jennifer, Michael's new wife after his divorce
- Christina Hendricks as Cynthia Mans, the mother who adopted Natalia next
- Jerod Haynes as Antwon Mans, the father who adopted Natalia next

==== Guest ====
- Mary Birdsong as Sandy Mosley
- Kyle Bornheimer as Dr. Wachter
- Dominic Burgess as Tom
- Jennifer Lafleur as Leslie
- David Paymer as Dr. Stephen Lawrence
- Tracie Thoms as Randi Burch
- Nicholle Tom as Mary Leones
- Sofia Hublitz as young Kristine
- Aida Turturro as Myra Grant
- Geoffrey Arend as Detective Taylor
- Zach Tinker as young Michael
- Peter Holden as Ted Jones
- Olivia Sandoval as Melinda Aguilar
- Jacqueline Emerson as Rhian
- Jane Adams as JJ
- Marin Hinkle as Jackie Starbuck, a prosecutor
- Michelle Krusiec as Dr. Marena Perkins
- Derek Webster as Terrance Kinnard, an attorney
- Rob Nagle as Dr. Phil
- Sean O'Bryan as Judge Huss
- Briana Venskus as Toni, a nurse
- Diandra Lyle as Deidra Hayes

=== Season 2 ===
- Patrick Schwarzenegger as John Bobbitt
- Isabela Merced as Lorena Bobbitt

== Episodes ==
No.	Title	Directed by	Written by	Original release date
1	"Almost Like a Prayer"	Liz Garbus	Katie Robbins	March 19, 2025
2	"Jump the Jitters Out"	Stacie Passon	Katie Robbins	March 19, 2025
3	"Ghosts Everywhere"	Seith Mann	Sarah Sutherland	March 26, 2025
4	"Right There in Black and White"	Eva Vives	Eoghan O'Donnell	April 2, 2025
5	"Too Hurty Without It"	Liz Garbus	Katie Robbins	April 9, 2025
6	"Not Today Satan"	Hannah Fidell	Jaquen Tee Castellanos	April 16, 2025
7	"If You Tell a Story Well Enough"	Iain B. MacDonald	Samantha Levenshus	April 23, 2025
8	"Blood on Her Hands"	Iain B. MacDonald	Katie Robbins & Sarah Sutherland	April 30, 2025

== Production ==
=== Season 1 ===
In August 2022, it was reported that Hulu had ordered a limited series inspired by true events of Natalia Grace's life, created by Katie Robbins. Ellen Pompeo signed on to star as Kristine Barnett and executive produce under her Calamity Jane banner, along with Laura Holstein. Sarah Sutherland, Mike Epps, Dan Spilo, Niles Kirchner, and Andrew Stearn also executive produce. The series's working title was "The Orphan".

Produced by 20th Television (previously through ABC Signature), the series is told from multiple points of view to "reflect the conflicting narratives of its central characters". Liz Garbus directs and executive produces the pilot. In March 2024, Mark Duplass was cast to play Michael Barnett. The real Barnett was the only person to sell the rights to their story for the series. The following month, Dulé Hill and Sarayu Blue were cast in recurring roles. By July 2024, principal photography was taking place in Santa Clarita, California.

=== Season 2 ===
In an interview with The Hollywood Reporter, Ellen Pompeo discussed the potential continuation of the series. She confirmed that the story of Kristine Barnett, her character, was complete, but revealed that conversations with Hulu had begun shortly after the finale regarding the show's future. Options included either extending the existing narrative if a good reason emerged or transitioning to an anthology format focusing on a different story in a subsequent season. Pompeo expressed particular interest in the anthology approach, noting that a new story was already under consideration. She stated that if the series moved in this direction, she would likely not return as an actor but would remain involved as a producer.

In August 2026, the series was renewed for a second season, which follows the story about the former married couple John and Lorena Bobbitt.

In October, Patrick Schwarzenegger and Isabela Merced were announced as the leads of season two as John and Lorena Bobbitt.

== Release ==
The eight-episode first season was released weekly by Hulu, with a two-episode premiere on March 19, 2025. Internationally, Good American Family was made available to stream on Disney+.

== Reception ==
=== Viewership ===
TVision, using its Power Score to evaluate CTV programming through viewership and engagement across over 1,000 apps, calculated that Good American Family was the sixth most-streamed series from March 17–23. The series ranked No. 1 on Hulu's "Top 15 Today" list—a daily updated list of the platform's most-watched titles—on March 25. The streaming aggregator Reelgood, which tracks real-time data from 20 million U.S. users for original and acquired content across SVOD and AVOD services, reported that Good American Family was the eighth most-streamed program in the U.S. for the week ending March 26. TVision later estimated that the series was the eighth most-streamed show between April 7–13.

Nielsen Media Research, which records streaming viewership on U.S. television screens, estimated Good American Family garnered 344 million minutes of watch time between March 24–30. It later recorded 376 million minutes of watch time from April 28 to May 4. The finale of Good American Family garnered 6.3 million views within its first six days of streaming. It became the third most-watched finale in Hulu's history and the most-viewed finale of 2025 to date across both Hulu and Disney+. Nielsen Media Research calculated that Good American Family drew 6.7 million U.S. viewers in its first 35 days, making it one of the most popular shows of the 2024–2025 season. In an interview with The Hollywood Reporter, Ellen Pompeo noted that the success of the series surpassed initial expectations, including those held by Hulu.

=== Critical response ===
The first season received generally mixed reviews from critics. On the review aggregator website Rotten Tomatoes, 50% of 28 critics' reviews are positive, with an average rating of 5.8/10. The website's critics' consensus reads: "Good American Family's ambitious use of perspective has some rewards, but it also makes for a lopsided and questionable dramatization of this sordid true story." Metacritic, which uses a weighted average, assigned the first season a score of 58 out of 100, based on 16 reviews, indicating "mixed or average reviews".

Cristina Escobar of RogerEbert.com stated that Good American Family initially feels like a typical Lifetime movie but praised how the series evolves into a complex exploration of morality and human nature. She found that while the first episode was melodramatic, the show shifted gears in the second episode, embracing horror and feminist themes. Escobar stated that the cast, particularly Imogen Faith Reid, delivered strong performances, and enjoyed how the show shifted perspectives. She also appreciated the series' thoughtful exploration of guilt, justice, and redemption, calling it a more complex show than it initially appears. Kristen Baldwin of Entertainment Weekly appreciated how Good American Family portrays the Natalia Grace case through shifting perspectives, with Ellen Pompeo and Imogen Faith Reid delivering strong performances. She praised the show for its suspenseful narrative, presenting conflicting accounts without fully endorsing one side, which adds to the tension. Baldwin highlighted the portrayal of Kristine Barnett as a controlling, image-obsessed mother, while appreciating Reid's ability to capture Grace's vulnerability and detachment. She stated that Good American Family hooks viewers, but leaves many questions unanswered, making it a gateway for further exploration of the real-life case.

Jazmin Aguilera of The Boston Globe found Pompeo's ability to convincingly play both Kristine Barnett's self-righteousness and her later descent into paranoia impressive, showcasing the character's multifaceted delusions. She also commended the series' Rashomon-style narrative, which effectively shifts perspectives, making each character's version of events feel authentic. While noting the show's occasional reliance on tired thriller tropes, she recognized its power in later episodes, where Reid's portrayal of Natalia Grace added depth to the story, revealing the complexity of her character and the abuse she endured. Benjamin Lee of The Guardian said Good American Family effectively presents the story of Natalia Grace by offering competing perspectives and a shifting timeline. He praised the show's ability to skew the "momfluencer" culture and highlight the rot underneath it, particularly through Pompeo's portrayal of Kristine Barnett. Lee found the series engaging as it moved from thriller to crime drama, with a solid performance by Reid. However, he noted the series struggled with tone, trying to balance sensationalism with moral reflection. Lee appreciated the performances of Christina Hendricks and Mark Duplass but found the show's visual aesthetic too plain for such a wild story. He stated that while those familiar with Natalia Grace's story might find less value in the series, it holds more significance for viewers unfamiliar with the case.

=== Accolades ===
Good American Family was nominated for Location Team of the Year - Episodic Television - One Hour at the 2024 California on Location Awards. The series was one of 200 television series that received the ReFrame Stamp for the years 2024 to 2025. The stamp is awarded by the gender equity coalition ReFrame and industry database IMDbPro for film and television projects that are proven to have gender-balanced hiring, with stamps being awarded to projects that hire female-identifying people, especially women of color, in four out of eight key roles for their production.
