= Julianne Romy =

French human rights attorney

- Occupation: Human rights attorney

Julianne Romy is a French human rights attorney. She has served on criminal tribunals and assisted several NGOs in pro bono litigation cases of female genital mutilation, arbitrary detention, and capital punishment across Southeast Asia, the Middle East, North America, West Africa, and Europe. Romy is a strategic advisor for pursuing accountability of human rights violations globally.
