= The Curious Case of Natalia Grace =

2023/24 documentary series

The Curious Case of Natalia Grace is a 2023 documentary television series which examines the story of Natalia Grace, a Ukrainian girl who was adopted by an American family but abandoned by them two years later. It initially aired on Investigation Discovery, with streaming later available on HBO Max. It has run for sixteen episodes across three seasons from 2023 to 2025.
