= André van der Merwe (urologist) =

South African urologist

- Born: 1967 or 1968 (age 58–59)
- Education: Stellenbosch University
- Occupations: Urologist, surgeon
- Known for: Performing the world's first successful penis transplant

André van der Merwe is a South African urologist. He is currently head of urology at the University of Stellenbosch and an associate professor at Tygerberg Hospital. He is best known for conducting the world's first successful penis transplant in 2014. He also performed the first laparoscopic kidney removal in South Africa.

== Early life and education ==
Van der Merwe grew up in the town of Sutherland in the Northern Cape province of South Africa. His childhood dream was to become an astronomer. He is a fan of singer Barbra Streisand.

Merwe received his MBChB degree from Stellenbosch University. Then he received MMed degree in Urology from the University of Cape Town, MRCS degree from Royal College of Surgeons of England, and Fellowship from Colleges of Medicine of South Africa.

== Career ==
Apart from his positions at the University of Stellenbosch and the Tygerberg Hospital, Van der Merwe is a National Deputy Delegate for South Africa with the Société Internationale d'Urologie.

As a urologist, Van der Merwe regularly performs kidney transplants. In 2008, he performed the first laparoscopic removal of kidney in South Africa. The kidney was removed from a living donor to be donated to her sister. The duration of the surgery was four hours in total, which is longer than a traditional kidney removal. Van der Merwe said that the longer surgery time was offset by the much quicker patient recovery time. Van der Merwe said that the new method of organ removal could attract up to 40% more donors than there were at the time.

=== Penis transplant ===
On 11 December 2014, Van der Merwe led a team of surgeons through a nine-hour surgery at the Tygerberg Hospital, in order to surgically attach a penis from a deceased donor to an anonymous patient, who had to have his penis amputated after a ceremonial circumcision went wrong two years prior to the surgery (three years prior to the announcement of the surgery). The surgery was announced by the University of Stellenbosch's faculty of medicine and health sciences on 13 March 2015. Van der Merwe predicted the transplanted penis to be fully functional in two years' time. Van der Merwe was 46 years old when the surgery was announced. Following the surgery, some media outlets dubbed him "Dr. Dick".

== Accolades ==
In 2008, Van der Merwe was awarded the Karl Storz Golden Cystoscope for the most outstanding young urologist in South Africa.

In 2012, at the congress of the South African Urological Association, he received the Sanofi-Aventis award for urological excellence and outstanding service in furthering the practice of Urology in South Africa.
