= John and Lorena Bobbitt =

American couple

John Wayne Bobbitt (born 1967) and Lorena Gallo (formerly Bobbitt; born May 15, 1969) are an American former couple whose marriage received international press coverage in 1993 when Lorena severed John's penis with a kitchen knife while he was asleep in bed. His penis was successfully surgically reattached.

Lorena, who had immigrated to the United States from Venezuela, alleged that John, a bar bouncer and U.S. Marine Veteran, whom she married on June 18, 1989, had raped and abused her for years. John was charged with rape later in 1993 but was acquitted and subsequently starred in two pornographic films. The next year, Lorena was acquitted of assault by reason of insanity and went on to start a foundation for domestic abuse victims and their children.

== Attack ==
Lorena severed her husband John's penis on June 23, 1993, at their home in Manassas, Virginia. Lorena stated in a court hearing that, after coming home that evening, her husband had raped her. After he then went to sleep, she got out of bed and went to the kitchen for a drink of water. She then grabbed an eight-inch (20 cm) Ginsu carving knife on the kitchen counter, returned to their bedroom, pulled back the bed sheets, and cut off his penis.

After this, Lorena left the apartment with the severed appendage and drove away in her car. After a length of time driving and struggling to steer with one hand due to holding the penis, she threw the penis out a window into a roadside field on Maplewood Drive. She eventually stopped and called 911, telling them what she had done and where the penis could be found.

John's penis was found after an exhaustive search, and after being washed with antiseptic and packed in saline ice, it was reattached in the hospital where he was treated. The operation took nine and a half hours. John went on to star in two pornographic films in the 1990s, and stated in 2018 that his penis was "back to normal".

== Arrest and trial ==
When Lorena was arrested on June 23, 1993, she told the police, "He always have [sic] orgasm, and he doesn't wait for me ever to have orgasm. He's selfish." This conversation with Detective Peter Weintz was tape-recorded, and the transcript was read later in the trial by Mary Grace O'Brien, the Prince William County Assistant Commonwealth's Attorney who was prosecuting Lorena.

During the trial, the Bobbitts revealed details of their volatile relationship and the events that led to the assault. Lorena stated that John sexually, physically, and emotionally abused her during their marriage, claiming that he had flaunted his infidelities and forced her to have an abortion. Her defense attorneys, including Blair D. Howard, maintained that John's constant abuse eventually caused Lorena to "snap" because she was suffering from clinical depression and possibly post-traumatic stress disorder due to abuse. John denied the allegations of abuse; however, when he was cross-examined by Howard, his statements often conflicted with known facts.

Lorena testified that John had raped her and physically battered her on multiple occasions prior to the evening of the incident, that they lacked financial stability, and that John stole and spent her own income. The prosecution conceded that John had demonstrated a history of abuse toward his wife, which created a context for the assault. Expert witnesses for both sides testified that "he had mentally and physically battered her; that the abuse was escalating; and that, by 1993, she lived in constant fear of him." The defense strategy emphasized Lorena's action as being a mix of self-defense and temporary insanity constituting an "irresistible impulse". One expert witness testified that, "Lorena believed and was immobilized by John's threat that 'I will find you, whether we're divorced or separated. And wherever I find you, I'll have sex with you whenever I want to.'"

John was later acquitted of marital sexual assault by a jury of nine women and three men. He gave multiple versions of what had happened that evening in question, relating at various times to police and to the court that "they had not had sex; that Lorena had tried to initiate sex, but he had been too tired; that they had had sex, but he had slept through it; and that the sex had been consensual."

After seven hours of deliberation, the jury found Lorena not guilty by reason of insanity caused by an irresistible impulse to sexually wound John. As a result, she could not be held liable for her actions. Under state law, the judge ordered Lorena to undergo a 45-day evaluation period at Central State Hospital in Petersburg, Virginia, after which she would be released. In 1995, John and Lorena finalized their divorce.

== Aftermath ==
=== John ===
In September 1994, John appeared in the pornographic film John Wayne Bobbitt Uncut, directed by pornographic actor Ron Jeremy, in an attempt to make money; in 1996, he appeared in another, Frankenpenis (also known as John Wayne Bobbitt's Frankenpenis).

After the attack and acquittal, it was revealed that John was the father of a son, Andrew Williams, born in 1992 to Beatrice Williams of Niagara Falls, New York. She had been in a romantic relationship with John that ended in May 1992. In 1994, John was charged with striking Kristina Elliott, a 21-year-old former exotic dancer he met while in Las Vegas on a publicity tour. At the time, Elliot had been engaged to John, but after the event she broke off the engagement. On August 31, 1994, he was convicted of battery and sentenced to fifteen days in jail (75% of the original 60 day sentence was suspended). "I firmly believe you have an attitude problem," Justice of the Peace William Jansen told John. "Your attitude problem is caused by your drinking."

On August 10, 1998, John appeared on the World Wrestling Federation (now WWE)'s Monday Night Raw is War television program, where he was featured with Val Venis. Not long after, he moved to Las Vegas and worked as a bartender, limo driver, mover, pizza delivery driver, and tow-truck operator. He also had a stint serving at a wedding chapel as a minister of a local Universal Life Church.

In 1999, John received probation for his role in a theft at a store in Nevada. In 2003, he was sentenced to prison for violating his probation for the 1999 theft, after he was arrested on battery charges involving his then-wife, Joanna Ferrell. He was again twice arrested on charges of battery against Ferrell in 2004, and that same year, he filed for divorce under the name John W. Ferrell, which he had been using during his marriage with Joanna.

In 2014, John was hospitalized in an intensive care unit as a result of a car accident in Buffalo, New York. Bobbitt was not held responsible after an investigation determined the accident was caused by another motorist failing to heed a red light.

In 2024, John said that he had his toes amputated as a result of toxic peripheral polyneuropathy, which he speculated was the result of his exposure to toxic waters at Marine Corps Base Camp Lejeune in Jacksonville, North Carolina, when he served there in the 1980s. He said that the amputations alongside developing osteomyelitis had left him unable to work.

=== Lorena ===
After the trial, Lorena attempted to keep a low profile and reverted to the use of her maiden name, Gallo. In October 1996, she visited Ecuador, where she met with then-President Abdalá Bucaram for an official dinner. Some time later the two would baptize a child as godparents. Bucaram was criticized for inviting Lorena to the dinner.

In 2007, she was working at a beauty salon in Washington, D.C., and, the same year, founded Lorena's Red Wagon organization, which helps prevent domestic violence through family-oriented activities.

In June 2008, Lorena appeared on the CBS News program The Early Show, where she talked about her life since the incident. In the interview, she said that she was in a long-term relationship with a man named Dave Bellinger and that they had a two-and-a-half-year-old daughter.

=== Joint public appearance ===
Although Lorena told Oprah Winfrey in April 2009 that she had no interest in talking to John, they appeared together on the show The Insider in May 2009, their first meeting since their divorce. During that meeting, John apologized to her for the way he treated her during their marriage. John claimed that he still loved her and continued to send her Valentine's Day cards and flowers.

== Legacy and depiction in popular culture ==
The Bobbitt case brought attention to the issue of domestic violence and marital rape. Within days of the incident, some anti-domestic violence advocates and some feminist groups rallied around Lorena, citing the continuous abuse she suffered at the hands of John that led her to attack him, albeit in an unusual and violent manner.

Media attention surrounding the case resulted in national debate and also sparked a flurry of jokes, limericks, T-shirt slogans, and advertising gimmicks, as well as radio host Howard Stern having John as a guest on his 1993 New Year's Eve special and fundraising $250,000 to defray the outstanding costs of his surgery. MCI had also unknowingly been drawn into the fray by running a television commercial a couple of weeks after the incident, advertising how the Bobbitts — a family from Siaconset, Massachusetts, of no relation to John and Lorena Bobbitt — saved by switching to MCI, causing jokes to be made of "when they cut off your service, they mean it".

Shortly after the incident, episodes of "Bobbittmania" copycat crimes were reported, although the incidents were generally self-inflicted wounds or accidents. The names of John and Lorena Bobbitt eventually became synonymous with penis removal. The terms "Bobbittized punishment" and "Bobbitt procedure" gained social recognition. Bobbitt appears as a transitive verb in the Oxford English Dictionary, defined as "to cut off the penis of (a man, esp. a husband or lover), typically as an act of revenge for perceived sexual grievances". After the Gulf War, the United States Air Force decided to remove the tail gun turrets from all B-52 bombers; crews started calling the planes without tail guns "bobbitted".

The bristle worm Eunice aphroditois is informally known as the "Bobbitt worm" because it attacks its prey with scissor-like jaws.

Artist Mary Beth Edelson's work Kali Bobbit [sic] (1994) was included in MoMA PS1's 2015 survey show Greater New York. A modified mannequin represents Bobbitt as the Hindu goddess Kali, mounted on a ziggurat plinth adorned with knives and grasping a severed penis.

Musical parodist "Weird Al" Yankovic's 1994 song "Headline News", a parody of the Crash Test Dummies' "Mmm Mmm Mmm Mmm", refers to the "guy who made his wife so mad one night that she cut off his wiener".

Rapper Caparezza in 2003 had as a bonus track "La Sindrome di Lorena" for his second studio album Verità supposte, the song was inspired by this case and it was obtainable by winning a minigame on the artist's website.

In February 15, 2019, Amazon released Lorena, a four-part true crime docu-series produced by Jordan Peele about the incident, which features interviews with both Lorena and John. On May 25, 2020, Lifetime I Was Lorena Bobbitt as part of its "Ripped from the Headlines" feature film series. While Lorena served as the onscreen narrator and executive producer, Dani Montalvo portrayed Lorena Bobbitt and Luke Humphrey portrayed John Bobbitt.

John Bobbitt is referenced in Fall Out Boy's 2023 remake of Billy Joel's "We Didn't Start the Fire".

In the television series Family Guy, in season 18, episode 6, Peter Griffin narrates: "Well... It was the 1990s, the decade of Viagra, but also Lorena Bobbitt, so it was kind of a yay–boo period for penises".

The second season of Good American Family will focus on the incident. It was announced in August 2026.

== See also ==
- Bertha Boronda
- Brigitte Harris case
- Catherine Kieu
- Lin and Xie case
- Penis transplantation
- Sada Abe
- Carlos Castro (journalist)
