= Genital trauma =

Genital trauma is trauma to the genitalia.

== History of studying genital trauma ==
Doctors and nurses have been conducting sexual assault examinations and have been collecting evidence for victims of assault for 20 years. But the amount of scientific data collected on genital injuries post-sexual assault are still minimal. Therefore, there is no available evidence to show specific patterns of injury resulting from sexual assault. The motivation for investigating and collecting data on genital injuries has primarily been within the context of the legal system, such as proving or disproving sexual assault, rather than for medical purposes. The studies that have been done in the past 25 years in relation to sexual assault cases in the judicial system has laid the groundwork for interpreting sexual assault injuries. It is important for there to research on genital injuries more broadly relating to sexual activity (and not just sexual assault) to improve medical knowledge on the subject. Methods of studying and documenting genital injury has greatly improved through the use of tissue staining dyes and colposcopy. The first studies that used newer methods were retrospective chart reviews done in a hospital by a doctor or nurse. These studies used several different methods to identify and document injuries, such as direct visualization, colposcopy, and/or tissue staining dyes. Earlier studies only used direct visualization for their data.

== Vaginal trauma ==
Vaginal trauma can occur when something is inserted into the vagina, for example, a sharp object, causing penetrating trauma. Vaginal trauma can occur as a result as an initial painful sexual experience or sexual abuse. Vaginal trauma can occur in children as a result of a straddle injury. Most of these, though distressing, are not serious injuries. In some instances a severe injury occurs and requires immediate medical attention especially if the bleeding will not stop. Vaginal trauma occurs during an episiotomy.

=== Vaginal trauma from consensual and non-consensual intercourse ===
Vaginal trauma is possible during and after consensual and non-consensual intercourse so it is difficult to determine the circumstances in which the trauma occurs only based on a physical examination. It can be difficult to differentiate between injuries from consensual sex and injuries from sexual assault in adolescents. Women are three times more likely to have vaginal injuries and intercourse-related injuries from a forced assault than from a consensual sexual experience. Vaginal lacerations that happen during consensual or non consensual intercourse might need surgery, but victims of a forced assault will need additional services such as police intervention and trauma counseling. There is little research on minor injuries in adult, pre-menopausal women, adolescent girls, and post-menopausal women that do not require surgery or treatment.

==== Risk factors ====
There are factors that can predispose women to vaginal injury during consensual sex. These things include: first sexual experience, pregnancy, vigorous penetration, vaginal atrophy and spasm, previous operation or radiation therapy, disproportionate genitalia, penile ornamentation, and congenital anomalies. During vaginal intercourse in the missionary position with legs tilted all the way back, the penis reaches its deepest penetration and the extreme rotation of the uterus leads to hyper distention of the vaginal wall, which in some cases can cause it to rupture. This position is the most likely position for vaginal laceration. The vaginal wall on the right side is the most commonly torn site in this position. Vaginal lengthening and lubrication usually occurs naturally in a consensual sexual situation. Vaginal tearing can occur in rape victims because those two things will not occur. This is consistent with the fact that more injuries result from sexual assault than from consensual intercourse. An inability to produce adequate vaginal lubrication and dilatation is thought to be an underlying cause of severe tears in the upper area of the vagina.

==== Types ====
Intercourse-related lacerations can range from superficial tears to more severe lacerations, tears rarely extend into the rectal lumen and the peritoneal cavity. Recto-vaginal injuries are usually a result of assault with a foreign object, rape, or accidental gynecologic injury. Injuries of this severity that resulted from consensual sex are very rare. Posterior and right vaginal fornix lacerations have been known to occur during consensual vaginal intercourse. The location of these lacerations is usually based on a woman's reproductive anatomy. It is common for women to have a uterus that lies slightly to the right, this exposes the right fornix and makes it easier for some type of tearing or trauma to occur. Lacerations to the posterior peri-cervical vagina tend to occur in the missionary position, hips and legs hyperflexed. Other positions can also expose the posterior vaginal wall that usually protected by the cervix, this allows for posterior fornix tears. Tears in the upper area of the vagina are more often reported in consensual intercourse than forced intercourse. Complications from severe vaginal lacerations, such as from an assault, can include hemoperitoneum, pneumoperitoneum, and retroperitoneal hematoma with or without vaginal perforation. Tears along the long axis of the vagina or the posterior fourchette lacerations are more likely to occur from rape. Lacerations or tears of the hymen are common but are not indicative of consensual or non-consensual intercourse.

==== Treatment ====
Diagnosing and treating vaginal trauma can often be difficult and delayed due to the sensitive and personal nature of these types of injuries; this also may be enhanced if the patient is young in age. The repair of most genital injuries require suture and the bleeding from the area is usually minimal. The bleeding that results from extreme vaginal tears can be copious, leading to hemorrhagic shock, and the patient may need a blood transfusion. Treatment of these lacerations could warrant surgical repair.

== Vulvar trauma ==
Vulvar trauma is more common in prepubertal children due to small labial fat pads and more physical activity. Adults are more protected. Though some injuries are serious, most are accidental minor blunt traumas. The most common type of injury is a straddle injury, which can be incurred through normal activities like bicycle riding. Due to the vascularity of the vulva, it may form a large hematoma when injured. The vulva can also be injured through sexual assault. Vulvar trauma can occur concurrently with vaginal trauma, especially if a sharp object is involved.

== Penile trauma ==
Penile trauma can take several forms. Abrasions can be caused by a zipper injury, and fractures can be caused by sexual activity. One type of penile trauma is penile amputation. Penile amputation is a rare injury and is considered an emergency urological condition. Some of the reasons this may occur are self-mutilation with psychiatric disturbances, sexual need, accidents, iatrogenic injuries, or revenge and marriage breakdown. Since this is a rare injury there is no standardized method to treat this. Micro-surgical repair seems to be the most effective method to achieve a return of sensation and erectile function.

== Testicular trauma ==
Testicular trauma is an injury to one or both testicles. Types of injuries include blunt, penetrating and degloving. The testes are located within the scrotum, which hangs outside of the body, and do not have the protection of muscles and bones. This makes it easier for the testes to be struck, hit, kicked or crushed, which occurs most often during contact sports. Testicles can be protected by wearing athletic cups during sports. Trauma to the testes can cause severe pain, bruising, swelling, and/or in severe cases even infertility. It can also turn in its space, causing a blockage of the vascular supply, this condition requires immediate medical attention (testicular torsion). In most cases, the testes—which are made of a spongy material—can absorb some impact without serious damage.

== See also ==
- Groin attack
- Penile fracture
- Testicular rupture
- Genital mutilation
