= Natalia Grace =

American adoptee with dwarfism (born 2003)

- Born: Natalia Vadymivna Gava; September 4, 2003 (age 23); Mykolaiv, Ukraine
- Other name: Natalia Lourdes Ciccone
- Citizenship: United States
- Height: 3 ft 7 in (109 cm)
- Parent(s): Kristine and Michael Barnett, her adoptive parents

Natalyah Grace Renee Mans (born Natalia Vadymivna Gava; Ukrainian: Наталія Вадимівна Гава; September 4, 2003; formerly Natalia Lourdes Ciccone and Natalia Grace Barnett) is an American with dwarfism. Born in Ukraine, she was adopted by an American family at the age of six in 2010, but was allegedly abandoned three years later.

Kristine and Michael Barnett, her adoptive parents, claimed that Natalia was an adult, and, in 2012, they successfully sought a court order legally changing her birth year from 2003 to 1989. Via an August 2023 DNA test, a healthcare testing company estimated that Natalia was about twenty-two years old at the time of the test, (Note: Age can be estimated from a DNA test by using the 'Epigenetic clock' as a measure of DNA methylation over time.) supporting the contention that she was ten years old when her adoptive parents allegedly abandoned her in an apartment in 2013. Her date of birth has since been legally restored to her 2003 birth year. The Barnetts were later charged with neglect; Michael was acquitted in 2022, and charges against Kristine were dismissed in 2023.

Antwon and Cynthia Mans officially adopted Natalia Grace in June 2023. While she had been living with the Mans family for almost a decade prior to this, the legal adoption was finalized around the time of the docuseries "The Curious Case of Natalia Grace: Natalia Speaks". However, three days before Christmas 2023, she was secretly taken from the Mans family by Nicole DePaul and her daughter Mackenzie (as seen in Season 3 of The Curious Case of Natalia Grace), and is currently living in New York after allegations of controlling and abusive behavior towards Natalia from the Mans family. The claims of abuse have not been confirmed and in 2025 an official in Crawfordsville, Indiana, reportedly stated "there is currently no ongoing investigation involving Antwon and Cynthia Mans or their residence."

As of January 2025, Natalia Grace lives with Nicole and Vincent DePaul in New York, a couple with dwarfism.

Barnett is the subject of two television series, The Curious Case of Natalia Grace, a docuseries, and the Hulu dramatization Good American Family.

== Early life and adoption ==
Natalia Grace was born in Mykolaiv, Ukraine, on September 4, 2003, as Natalia Vadymivna Gava (Ukrainian: Наталія Вадимівна Гава; named by social services Natasha (Наташа)). Her parents were Vadim "Vadik" Gava (Вадим «Вадик» Гава) and Anna Volodymyrivna Gava (Анна Володимирівна Гава)).

Natalia was diagnosed with spondyloepiphyseal dysplasia congenita, a rare form of dwarfism. Her mother, identified as born on April 20, 1979, placed her in an orphanage in Ukraine after her birth, with the recorded rationale of the "child hav[ing] congenital defects" and, being unmarried with a 4-year-old, "hav[ing] not enough money to raise another child".

In 2008, she was adopted as Natalia Lourdes Ciccone by Dyan and Gary Ciccone of New Hampshire. The Ciccones placed her for adoption in 2010, for unknown reasons; only alleged by People (magazine). She was adopted by Kristine and Michael Barnett in the spring of 2010, taking the legal name "Natalia Grace Barnett".

== Alleged abandonment ==
In 2012, the Barnetts successfully petitioned the Marion County, Indiana court to change Natalia's Ukrainian birth records to indicate a 1989 birth date, which legally changed her age from eight to twenty-two. In July 2013, the Barnetts moved Natalia to an apartment in Westfield, Indiana, and later Lafayette, Indiana. Leaving Natalia alone in the Lafayette apartment, the Barnetts then moved along with their biological children to Ontario, Canada so that their oldest son could begin graduate studies at the University of Waterloo and the Perimeter Institute.

Shortly after being left alone in the Lafayette apartment, Natalia was invited to live with Antwon Corry Mans, a self-described "bishop," and his wife, Cynthia Mary Renee Mans, who noticed that Natalia struggled to live on her own. In 2016, they filed to become Natalia's legal guardians, describing her as an "alleged incapacitated person" who was 13 or 14 years old, changing her name to Natalyah Grace Renee Mans. The Barnetts were charged with neglect of a dependent but Michael was affirmed "not guilty" in 2022 and Kristine's charges were dismissed in 2023.

The prosecutors in the neglect case against the Barnetts claimed to have located Natalia's birth mother, Anna Gava, in Ukraine and additionally claimed that DNA testing confirmed Gava as Natalia's biological mother, but this was never independently verified. Prosecutors also declined to call Gava as a witness. If Natalia's court-assigned birth date of 1989 were correct, Gava would have given birth to Natalia at ten years of age. The prosecutors also obtained birth and hospital records from Ukraine which support Natalia's original September 4, 2003, birth date and were barred from presenting the evidence that Natalia was a minor child born in 2003 when she was left to live alone in an apartment, and the neglect case was tried based on Natalia's disability, not her age. The prosecution was barred from presenting such information and evidence as the court felt it did not have the authority to overrule the earlier 2012 ruling establishing her birth date as 1989.

Cynthia Mans, who took Natalia in after discovering her abandoned in the Lafayette apartment, said she believed that Kristine Barnett was inspired to legally change Natalia's age by the 2009 film Orphan. The Barnetts claimed that Natalia was lying about her age and also exhibited sociopathic behavior which is similar to the plot of that film. The Mans said that Natalia had not exhibited violent behavior while living in their home.

In December 2023, Natalia secretly left the Mans' home (as seen in Season 3 of The Curious Case of Natalia Grace), and moved in with Vincent and Nicole DePaul, a couple that both have dwarfism and claimed to have originally "attempted to adopt" Natalia prior to her adoption by the Barnetts, though claims by Friends of Ukraine, authors of the Amazon book, NATALIA GRACE: UNRAVELING FACT FROM FICTION, assert that the couple backed out of an adoption.

Natalia has reported that she "always loved" the DePauls and wished that she could have "seen them more growing-up." The DePauls have stated that they have no plans to officially adopt her, as Natalia is now an adult. Natalia reported that she feels "free" while living with the DePauls and that they are teaching her "how to live with [her] dwarfism".

== Media coverage ==
In 2019, Natalia appeared on an episode of Dr. Phil. Her life is the subject of the 2023 Investigation Discovery series The Curious Case of Natalia Grace (re-titled to The Curious Case of Natalia Grace: Natalia Speaks for season 2). Season 3 premiered January 7, 2025, on Max. Her story is the basis of the Hulu TV series Good American Family, in which she is played by Imogen Faith Reid.

== See also ==
- Disruption (adoption)
- International adoption
