= Carlos Castro (journalist) =

Portuguese journalist (1945–2011)

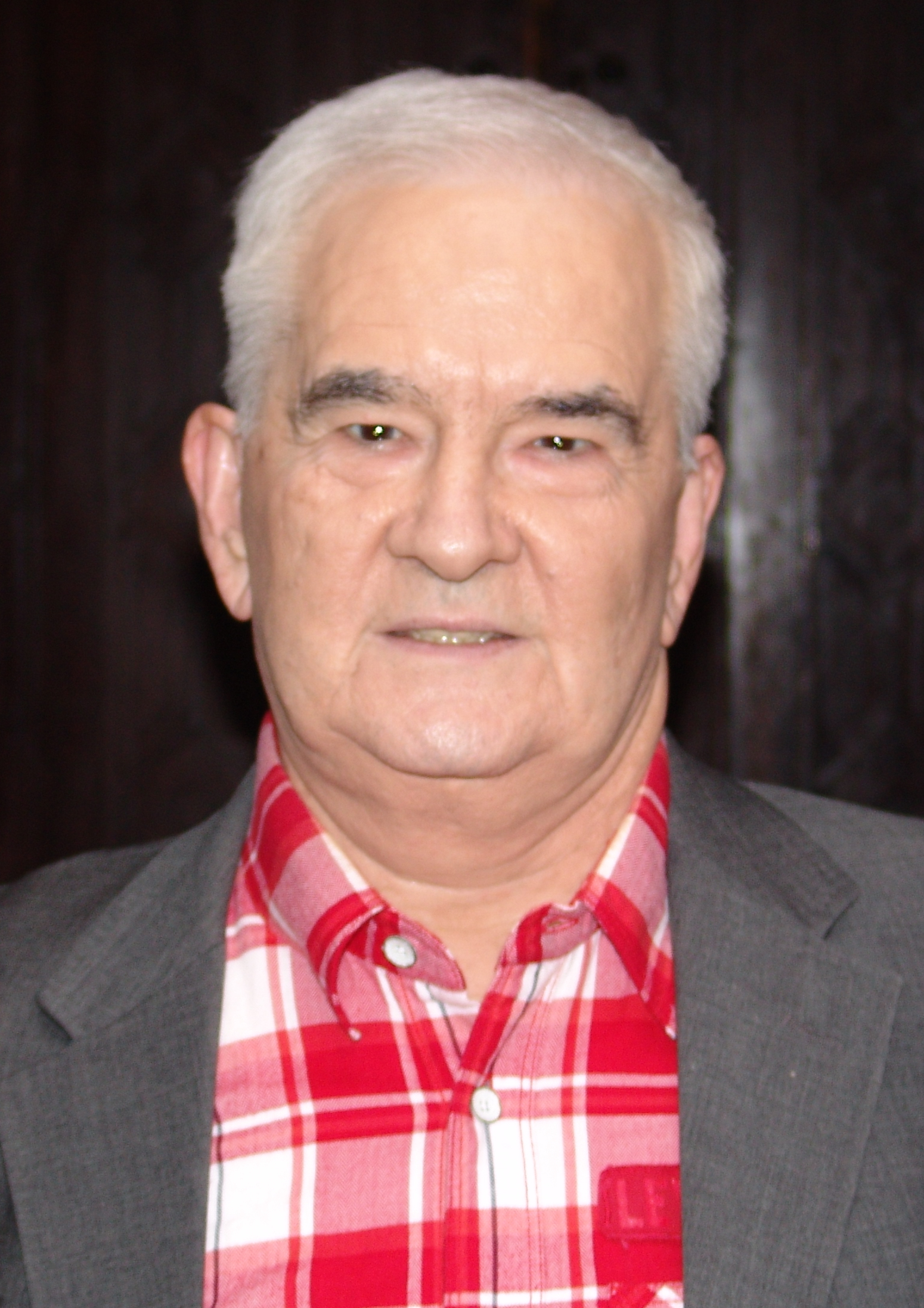
- Castro in 2010
- Born: Carlos António Castro; 5 October 1945; Moçâmedes, Portuguese Angola
- Died: 7 January 2011 (aged 65); New York City, US
- Occupation: Journalist
- Years active: 1970–2011

Carlos António Castro (5 October 1945 – 7 January 2011) was a Portuguese television personality and journalist who, for over 35 years, covered mainly gossip items about musicians, actors, and celebrities. He became well known after he came out on television and participated in Big Show SIC, presented by João Baião, in the 1990s.

On 7 January 2011, Castro was found castrated and bludgeoned to death in a New York City hotel. The main suspect in his death was his boyfriend, 21-year-old male model Renato Seabra, who had been a contestant on the Portuguese television modelling-themed reality show À Procura do Sonho (SIC). In January 2011, Renato Seabra was charged with second-degree murder by the New York City Police Department (NYPD) after confessing to the killing of Castro. He was sentenced to 25 years to life in December 2012.

== Personal life ==
Castro was born in Moçâmedes, Angola during the time period that it was a Portuguese colony. During his childhood, Castro had a great interest in works of poetry. He moved to Luanda to become a reporter when he was 15. During his life, he became a "high-profile public figure as a TV personality" in Portugal, who had worked in the media for 35 years covering gossip items about musicians, actors and celebrities, having gained further popularity because of his public coming out as a homosexual to the country and "revealing the feminine side of his personality". By 2011, the year of his death, he was dating 21-year-old male model Renato Seabra, who had been a contestant on the Portuguese television modelling-themed reality show À Procura do Sonho.

== Murder ==
Both Castro and Renato Seabra had travelled to the United States in order to "see some Broadway shows and spend New Year's Eve in Times Square". A friend who had accompanied them on the trip, newspaper editor Luis Pires, stated in a later interview that, "There had been some friction between the two men toward the end of the trip, but nothing to suggest that anything horrible was about to happen". The two went to see a musical on Broadway and also a movie during their stay, but on Friday night, when they were meant to be meeting up with Pires's ex-wife and his daughter in the InterContinental hotel lobby, they did not show. Instead, Seabra appeared and allegedly said, "Carlos will never leave the hotel again."

Pires's ex-wife and his daughter immediately notified hotel staff and security, who found Castro's body in the room around 7:00 p.m. that evening. Castro had been beaten with a nearby laptop and a broken wine bottle had originally been believed to be the weapon used to castrate him. It was later discovered that the corkscrew for opening the wine bottle had been the castration implement. It had also been used to gouge out one of Castro's eyes. The medical examiner ruled that Castro's death was caused by "blunt impact injuries on the head and neck compression." The examiner also noted that there were marks of strangulation on the body. When police looked for Seabra to interrogate him about the crime, he had already left the scene and later admitted himself to the St. Luke's-Roosevelt Hospital Center because he had tried to slit his own wrists. He was tracked down after his taxi driver called the police when he saw Seabra's picture in a police bulletin. Taken into custody, he was given a psychiatric evaluation at Bellevue Hospital Center a few hours later and was considered a person of interest.

After interrogation by the New York City Police Department at the hospital, Renato Seabra admitted to the murder, stating that he had killed Castro in order to "get rid of [his] 'homosexual demons'". Detectives for the police believe that Seabra had killed Castro after the latter had "refused to take him on an expensive shopping trip". In light of this confession, he was charged with second-degree murder. Odília Pereirinha, Seabra's mother and a nurse with residency in Cantanhede, arrived in New York not long after his confession. She planned on accompanying her son through the trial process in the US.

Renato Seabra was transferred on 10 January 2011 to the prison section of the Bellevue Hospital Center, while his case was handed over to the New York County District Attorney, Cyrus Vance Jr. On 21 December 2012, a Manhattan judge gave the maximum sentence of 25 years to life to Seabra. As of January 2013, Seabra was given the NYSDOCCS ID number 13A0056 and was imprisoned in the Clinton Correctional Facility in Dannemora, New York. By March 2036, Renato Seabra could gain full release from his current prison, allowing him to return to Portugal. Meanwhile, Castro's sisters spread his ashes in New York City Subway tunnels under Broadway, as was his preference.

== Depois da Vida show ==
Castro was posthumously shown on the Portuguese television TVI's program Depois da Vida (After Life), a paranormal-related show where a British female medium, Anne Germain, claims she can have a conversation with dead people, that had been filmed in October 2010. During the show broadcast on 21 January 2011, Castro was allegedly "visited" by old drag queen friend José Centúrio de Almeida (stage name: Ruth Bryden), among other people he had known. The episode was originally delayed in airing due to complaints, but the producers decided to air the episode anyway. Afterwards, four further complaints were made to the Entidade Reguladora para a Comunicação Social (ERC), which were then sent to the board's legal department.
