= Mayhem (crime) =

Criminal offence consisting of the intentional maiming of another person

Mayhem (from Anglo-Norman maiuhem, from Old French mahaigne 'injury, damage, wrong, etc.'; cognate to maim) is a common law criminal offence consisting of the intentional maiming of another person.

Under the law of England and Wales and other common law jurisdictions, it originally consisted of the intentional and wanton removal of a body part that would handicap a person's ability to defend themselves in combat. Under the strict common law definition, initially this required damage to an eye or a limb, while cutting off an ear or the nose was not deemed to be sufficiently disabling. In the many years since, the meaning of the crime expanded to encompass any type of mutilation, disfigurement, or crippling act done using any instrument.

== England ==
=== History of definitions ===
In England and Wales, it has fallen into de facto disuse. In 1992 the Law Commission recommended that it be abolished, and in 1998 the Home Office proposed to abolish it, in the course of codifying the law relating to offences against the person.

=== Fetter v. Beale ===
The most significant change in common-law mayhem doctrine came in 1697, when the King's Bench decided Fetter v. Beale, 91 Eng. Rep. 1122. There, the plaintiff recovered in a battery action against a defendant. Shortly thereafter, "part of his skull by reason of the said battery came out of his head", and the plaintiff brought a subsequent action under mayhem. Though Fetter is also known as an early example of res judicata, it is most significant for expanding the ambit of mayhem to include "loss of the skull".

== Modern doctrine ==
In modern times, the offense of mayhem has been superseded in many jurisdictions by statutory offenses such as:

- Aggravated battery
- Grievous bodily harm
- Assault

== United States ==
Modern statutes in the U.S. define mayhem as disabling or disfiguring, such as rendering useless a member of another person's arms or legs. The injury must be permanent, not just a temporary loss. Some courts will hold even a minor battery as mayhem if the injury is not minor. Mayhem in the U.S. is a felony in all states and jurisdictions, including federal. In the states of California, Vermont and Oklahoma, mayhem is punishable by up to life imprisonment. In other states where laws defining mayhem (or maiming) are in place, the maximum punishment for mayhem is generally 10 to 20 years, and mandatory minimum terms of imprisonment may also apply, depending on the laws of the state. If mayhem was committed in an aggravated fashion, such as in the case of where it resulted in permanent disability or disfigurement, the punishment is generally much more severe, and may even include life imprisonment. For example, simple mayhem in California is punishable by two to eight years in prison, whereas aggravated mayhem is punishable by up to life imprisonment.

== Etymology ==
Both the noun mayhem and the verb maim come from Old French via Anglo-Norman. The word is first attested in various Romance languages in the 13th century, but its ultimate origin is unclear.

== Figurative sense ==
The term "wreaker of mayhem" was, accurately, originally used for a person going on a rampage (onslaught) in the glorified setting of a just war. After such uses, the term abounded for centuries in journalese, such as reporting "rioting and mayhem", which readers misunderstood as meaning "havoc, chaos or pandemonium", and started the usual modern use of the word "mayhem". There is also the term "general mayhem" which involves a lot of anti-social activities happening.
