= Emasculation =

Removal of male sex organs

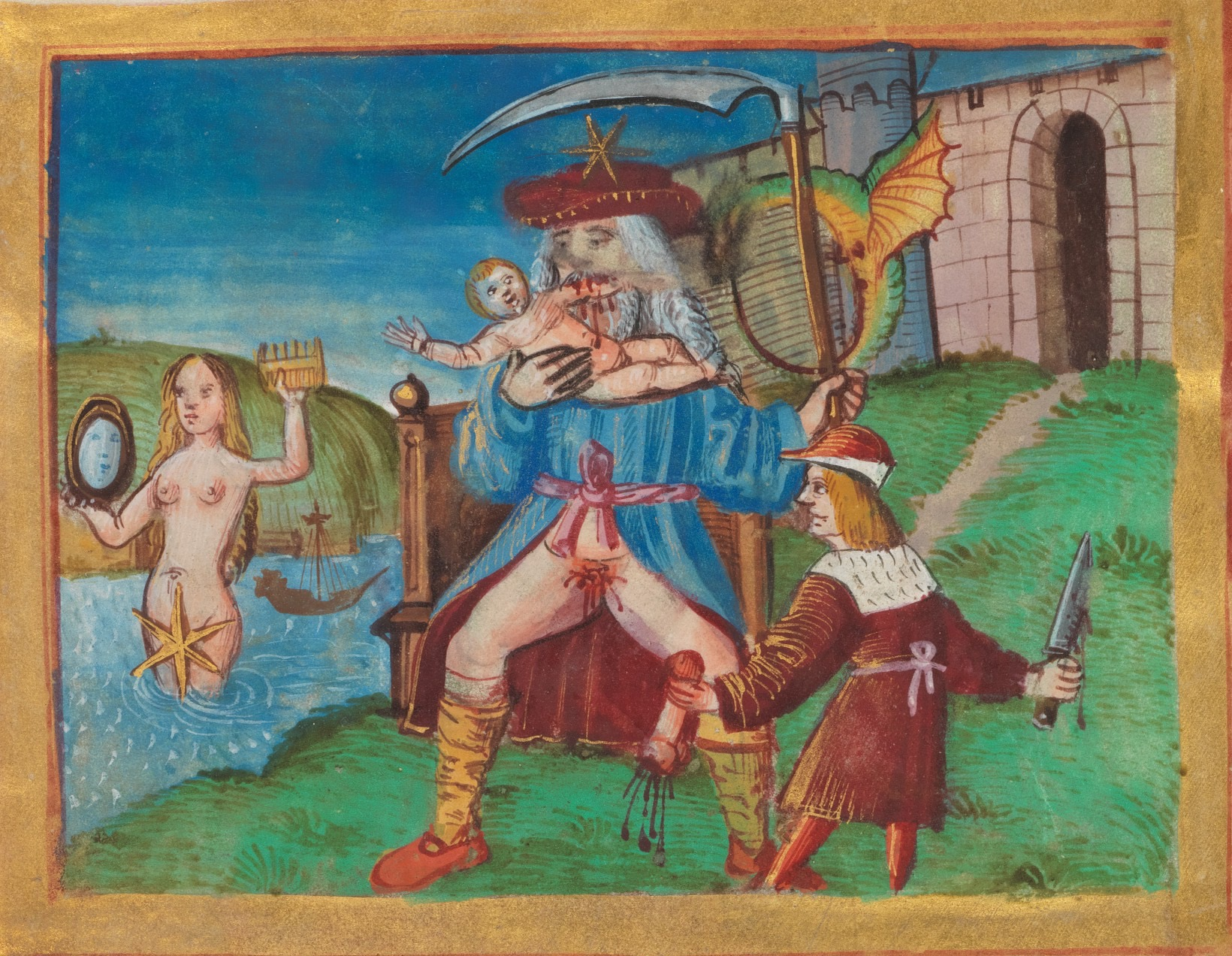
A painting of Cronus emasculating Uranus, c. 1501

Emasculation is the removal of the external male sex organs, which includes both the penis and the scrotum, the latter of which contains the testicles. It is distinct from castration, where only the testicles are removed. Although the terms are sometimes used interchangeably, the potential medical consequences of emasculation are more extensive due to the complications arising from the removal of the penis. There are a range of religious, cultural, punitive, and personal reasons why someone may choose to emasculate themself or another person.

The term emasculation may be used in a metaphorical sense, referring to the perceived loss of attributes traditionally associated with masculinity, such as strength, power, or autonomy.

== Method ==
There are several different methods of emasculation. Both the penis and testicles may be removed simultaneously using a sharp instrument, such as a knife or razor or swords. Non-crushing vascular clamps may also be used in medical surgery to cut off blood circulation and reduce bleeding.

== Medical consequences ==
Short-term consequences of emasculation include bleeding and infection. Historically, death was also a potential complication, although the prevalence is disputed.

Long term complications include incontinence, urethral stricture, urine retention, urinary tract infection, urine extravasation and bladder stones. Some studies have found that emasculation may cause a range of physiological changes, such as a shortened torso, widened stomach and hips, increased height, bowed legs, and an elongated skull. Additionally, emasculates typically have less or no facial and body hair, increased fatty tissue or gynecomastia, and a feminine fat pattern distribution. The physiological effects of emasculation are more severe for people who undergo the procedure before the onset of puberty.

== Reasons ==
=== Cultural ===
==== Imperial China ====
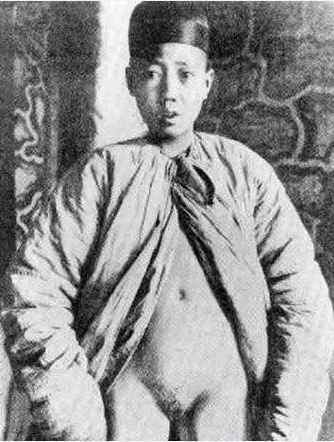
An emasculated Chinese eunuch from the Qing dynasty

Emasculation was performed in China on men to create palace eunuchs for the imperial court. The practice dates back to the Shang dynasty (1600–1046 BC) and continued up until 1924, when the eunuch system was abolished by the last emperor of China, Puyi. The last living palace eunuch, Sun Yaoting, died in 1996.

Originally, palace eunuchs were prisoners who were involuntarily emasculated. In the Qing dynasty, men began volunteering to undergo the procedure in order to gain employment, although instances of forced emasculation still occurred. One reason why recipients willingly underwent emasculation is that they saw employment as a palace eunuch as a way to acquire wealth and power. Alternatively, poverty was a reason why fathers forced their sons to undergo emasculation, and the desire for financial benefit motivated human traffickers to force emasculation on their victims.

There were several reasons why the Imperial court required its civil servants to be emasculated. Emasculation was thought to ensure a recipient's undivided loyalty to the emperor, as it severs the recipient's existing familial or social bonds and destroys their ability to produce future heirs. The choice to hire emasculated eunuchs also ensured the legitimacy of the emperor's lineage. The choice to emasculate, rather than merely castrate, was motivated by a desire to protect the chastity of women in the court, as emasculation rendered a recipient incapable of sexual intercourse. While emasculation was a pre-requisite for gaining employment as a palace eunuch, it did not guarantee employment.

The emasculation procedure was typically performed by a trained 'knifer', or 'knife expert'. To prepare for the operation, the recipient was bathed in cold water to numb his senses and, in some instances, his genitals were twisted to reduce blood flow. The recipient was then asked if he consented to the procedure, and if he answered yes the knifer excised the genitals with a single cut. Styptic powder was then applied to the wound to stop bleeding, and a pewter needle or spigot was inserted into the urethra to prevent stenosis (narrowing).

Some Chinese emasculates were the great historian Sima Qian; Cao Teng, the foster grandfather of Cao Cao; Zheng He, a Ming dynasty admiral of the imperial navy who sailed to Africa; and the surviving sons and grandson of rebel Yaqub Beg.

==== West Asia ====
To create eunuchs for the Arab slave trade, young black boys from South East Africa typically had their penis and scrotum amputated. White boys, by comparison, were usually only castrated.

=== Religious ===
==== Skoptsy ====
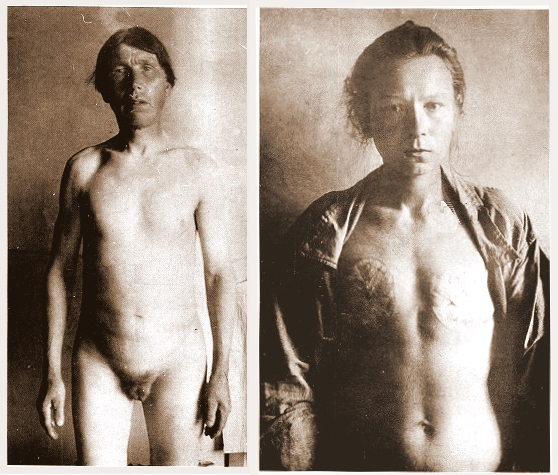
Emasculated Skoptsy male (left) and Skoptsy female with breasts cut off (right)

Emasculation was one form of genital mutilation practiced by the Skoptsy, a Russian Christian sect. For males, the other form of mutilation available was castration. Females could remove their nipples, breasts, labia majora, labia minora or clitoris. These practices may have begun sometime during the 1760s, after the sect was founded by Kondratii Selivanov, although they were only discovered by the broader community in 1772. They continued up until the 1930s, when the sect was destroyed and its members sentenced.

The Skoptsy practiced genital mutilation because they believed the genitals were the source of original sin, and that by removing them, they could attain salvation. The aim of removing the offending genitalia was to purify the body. Their belief was based on a literal reading of the verse of Matthew 19:12, which states: "There are some eunuchs, which were so born from their mother's womb: and there are some eunuchs, which were made eunuchs of men: and there be eunuchs, which have made themselves eunuchs for the kingdom of heaven's sake." In addition, the verses of Matthew 18:8,9 and Luke 23:29 were also cited as support. Of the two types of genital mutilation available to men, emasculation was called the Greater Seal. Castration, by comparison, was called the Lesser Seal. Emasculation was preferable because it rendered a recipient physically incapable of engaging in sinful sexual conduct, allowing them to attain a higher level of purity.

Originally, the emasculation procedure was performed by burning the testicles off with an iron. Later, the genitals were tied at the base and removed using a knife or razor blade. The wound was then cauterised, or a salve was applied, to prevent bleeding. Many Skoptsy were peasants and were familiar with animal husbandry, which meant their emasculation procedures were often performed with "surgical precision". In some instances, members of the Skoptsy would perform the emasculation on themselves, in an act of self-surgery, though it was more typical for the procedure to be performed by an elder during a ceremony.

==== Hijra ====
Throughout the Indian subcontinent tradition, including India, Bangladesh and Pakistan, some members of the Hijra community reportedly undergo emasculation, or nirvan.

Traditionally, emasculation was a rite of passage into the Hijra community. Today it remains an important ritual, though is not mandatory or universally practiced. When it is performed, it typically occurs several years after an individual has already participated within the Hijra community. While some Hijra are emasculated, others are intersex, undeveloped in puberty or impotent.

Whether or not a Hijra undergoes emasculation is influenced by a range of considerations. Some people are not emasculated because they are fearful of surgical complications, are under financial constraints, or merely as a matter of personal choice. For Muslim Hijra, emasculation may be avoided due to the belief that genital mutilation goes against Allah's will. Others see emasculation as necessary in order to be 'reborn' as a Hijra. In this view, emasculated Hijra are seen as more 'real' than those who are not. The decision to be emasculated may also be motivated by personal beliefs about whether a Hijra can have spiritual powers without undergoing the procedure. Amongst members of the Hijra community, this issue is subject to considerable debate.

In the past, the emasculation procedure was performed by barbers or by the individual themselves (i.e. self-emasculation). Nowadays, the operation is performed by a Hijra elder, also called a dai ma (midwife). They have no medical training, but believe they operate with the power of the patron goddess, Bahuchara Mata. The operation takes place early in the morning, around 3 a.m. or 4 a.m. Anesthesia is not administered. The penis and testes are tied together with a string, and the elder then makes two diagonal cuts with a sharp surgical knife to completely excise the organs. The elder allows the blood to gush from the wound, which is considered necessary to completely cleanse the recipient of their male parts. This is one reason why the procedure is performed by an elder rather than a medical professional, who might try to stop the haemorrhage, thus interfering with the ritual's cleansing effect. Afterwards, no stitches are taken and the wound is left exposed, although a small stick is inserted into the urethra to prevent urethral stricture.

=== Punishment ===
==== Ancient China ====
Emasculation was one of the Five Punishments used in ancient China. It was the prescribed punishment for people who engaged in licentious conduct, such as infidelity or rape. The first evidence of its use dates to the Shang dynasty (1700–1100 BC), when the characters for a knife and male genitalia were carved into oracle bones. It continued up until the Sui dynasty (581–618 CE), when it was formally abolished.

=== Self-inflicted ===
==== Mental disorder ====
There are reports of self-emasculation cases resulting from mental disorder. Some academics claim that a majority of self-emasculations are a result of psychosis, although this finding has been challenged. Nonetheless, there are several reported cases of people with schizophrenia engaging in self-emasculation.

It has been linked to other mental disorders such as dissociative identity disorder.

Klingsor syndrome (sometimes known as Skotpic syndrome) is a condition where people mutilate their genitals as a result of psychotic religious delusions. For example, in one case a person is reported to have mutilated his genitals after experiencing auditory hallucinations telling him he would only be allowed into the kingdom of heaven if he emasculated himself.

Body integrity dysphoria, or xenomelia, is another mental disorder that may drive a person to seek emasculation. People with this disorder are distressed by the presence of a limb that they do not identify as part of their body, including the genitals. Emasculation in this context alleviates their distress, enabling them to become 'whole'. Related to this is body dysmorphic disorder (BDD), with ideation of a defect it genitalia that causes stress and a desire for excision. However, the amputation of healthy limbs by medical professionals is highly controversial. The inability to acquire medically administered emasculation has driven some to self-emasculation.

Occasionally, self-emasculation is practiced by those suffering from gender dysphoria. When compared with the general population, transgender persons are at a higher risk of engaging in acts of genital self-mutilation, including self-emasculation. In the majority of these cases there is not male to female gender dysphoria. Rather, the subject usually continues to self identify as male, or often as a non binary, asexual, eunuch or third gender. Some adopt the term nullo, meaning someone whose sexuality has been nullified. Those with this form of gender dysphoria are often unable to access suitable medical care.

In some cases, a person with a mental illness has emasculated other people.

=== Involuntary or accidental ===
In some circumstances, a person may be emasculated involuntarily as the result of an accident, as part of a ritual attack, or due to poor circumcision practice.

In these cases, the objective of medical treatment is different than for cases of voluntary emasculation. The goals of treatment are to either reattach the severed genitals or to reconstruct an artificial penis and testes.

From 1960 to 2000, involuntarily emasculated infants were surgically reassigned female, similar to the treatment received by David Reimer after his penis was burnt off during a circumcision procedure. It is understood from cases like Reimer's that gender reassignment surgery in infancy can interfere with gender identity formation. Therefore, gender reassignment is no longer the standard practice for involuntarily emasculated infants.

== Other meanings ==
By extension, the word emasculation has also come to mean rendering a male less masculine, including by humiliation. It can also mean to deprive anything of vigour or effectiveness. This figurative usage has become more common than the literal meaning. For example: "William Lewis Hughes voted for Folkestone's amendment to Curwen's emasculated reform bill, 12 June 1809 ... "

In horticulture, the removal of male (pollen) parts of a plant, largely for controlled pollination and breeding purposes, is also called emasculation.

== See also ==
- Penis removal
- Genital modification and mutilation
- Castration anxiety
- Eunuch
- Feminization (sociology)
- Masculinity
