= Penis removal =

Removal of the penis

Penis removal is the act of removing the human penis. It is not to be confused with the related practice of castration, in which the testicles are removed or deactivated; or emasculation, which removes both. Penis removal and castration have been used to create a class of servants or slaves called eunuchs in many different places and eras, having a notable presence in various societies such as Imperial China.

In Russia, men of a devout group of Spiritual Christians known as the Skoptsy were castrated, either undergoing "greater castration", which entailed removal of the penis, or "lesser castration", in which the penis remained in place, while Skoptsy women underwent mastectomy. These procedures were performed in an effort to eliminate lust and to restore the Christian to a pristine state that existed prior to original sin.

In the modern era, removing the human penis for any such activity is very rare (with some exceptions listed below), and references to removal of the penis are almost always symbolic. Castration is less rare, and is performed as a last resort in the treatment of androgen-sensitive prostate cancer.

== Penis removal in medicine and psychology ==
Some men have penile amputations, known as penectomies, for medical reasons. Cancer, for example, sometimes necessitates removal of all or part of the penis. In some instances, botched childhood circumcisions have also resulted in full or partial penectomies.

Genital surgical procedures for transgender women undergoing sex reassignment surgery do not usually involve the complete removal of the penis; part or all of the glans is usually kept and reshaped as a clitoris, and the skin of the penile shaft may also be inverted to form the vagina. When procedures such as this are not possible, other procedures such as colovaginoplasty are used which do involve the removal of the penis.

Issues related to the removal of the penis appear in psychology, for example in the condition known as castration anxiety.

Some men have undergone penectomies as a voluntary body modification, thus including it as part of a body dysmorphic disorder.

Professional opinion is divided regarding the desire for penile amputation as a pathology, much as all other forms of treatment by amputation for body dysmorphic disorder. Voluntary subincision, removal of the glans penis, and bifurcation of the penis are related topics.

== History of involuntary penis removal ==
=== China ===
In ancient China, for crimes including adultery, "licentious" and "promiscuous" activity, males had their penises removed in addition to being castrated. This was one of the Five Punishments that could be legally inflicted on criminals in China. The exact crime was called gong, and referred to "immoral" sex between males and females. The punishment stated, "If a male and female engage in intercourse without morality, their punishments shall be castration and sequestration [respectively]." They were designed to permanently disfigure for life. "Castration", in China, meant the severing of the penis in addition to the testicles, after which male offenders were sentenced to work in the palace as eunuchs. The punishment was called gōngxíng (宫刑), which meant "palace punishment", since castrated men would be enslaved to work in the harem of the palace. It was also called "fǔxíng"(腐刑). Husbands who committed adultery were punished with castration as required under this law.

=== Japan ===
The removal of the penis was used as a punishment for men in the Heian period in Japan, where it replaced execution. It was called rasetsu 羅切 (らせつ), kamekiri 亀切 (かめきり) or chimpō-setsuraku 珍宝切落 (ちんぽうせつらく), and was separate from castration which was called kyūkei 宮刑 (きゅうけい). Rasetsu was done voluntarily by some Japanese Buddhist priests to ensure celibacy. Rasetsu was also known in Edo period Japan.

The word rasetsu was made out of the components "ra" from "mara" which meant penis, and "setsu", which meant cutting.

The word rasetsu was used in Japanese literature.

Kyūkei in Japanese law referred to the punishment of castration, which was used for male offenders, and confinement for females.

=== Arab slave trade ===
The Arab slave trade provided many eunuchs who were more highly prized, and priced. African boys were generally subject to penis removal, as well as castration.

== Treatment and effects of penis removal ==
A study of penis reattachment in China found that in a group of 50 men, all but one reacquired functionality, even though some involved full reconstructive surgery using tissue and bone. Reportedly, some of these men later fathered children.

=== Phalloplasty ===
If reattachment is not an option (such as the penis not being reattached long after 24 hours), doctors can reconstruct a penis from muscle and skin grafted from another part of the body like the forearm. However, a penile implant is needed for an erection to be possible, as the reconstructed penis would look strange and would either not be able to ejaculate, or ejaculate with less force. Patients are often dissatisfied with the reconstructed penis. Since 2015, Zephyr Surgical Implants produces malleable and inflatable penile implants particularly designed for phalloplasty surgeries. Standing during urination is an advantage offered by a reconstructed penis. If penis reconstruction is not done, the patient will have to squat in order to urinate since doctors reroute the entrance of the urethra to below the scrotum.

=== Penis transplantation ===
In the 21st-century, successful allographic penis transplantation surgery began.

== See also ==
- Aphallia, a condition where the phallus (penis or clitoris) is absent
- Apophallation, amputation of the penis in some species of air-breathing land slugs
- Genital modification and mutilation
- John and Lorena Bobbitt
- Lin and Xie case
- Genital retraction syndrome
- Skoptsy
