= Genital modification and mutilation =

Permanent or temporary changes to human sex organs

Genital modifications are forms of body modifications applied to the human sexual organs, including invasive modifications performed through genital cutting or surgery. The term genital enhancement seem to be generally used for genital modifications that modify the external aspect, the way the patient wants it. The term genital mutilation is used for genital modifications that drastically diminish the recipient's quality of life and result in adverse health outcomes, whether physical or mental. Mutilations are sometimes performed without consent or on people who cannot consent such as children and the mentally disabled.

== Reasons ==
=== Body modification ===
==== Voluntary ====
Many types of genital modification are performed at the behest of the individual, for personal, sexual, aesthetic or cultural reasons.

Social acceptance for male intimate cosmetic surgery seem to have happened around the 2010s, decades after other types of cosmetic surgeries.

Penile subincision, or splitting of the underside of the penis is widespread in a few traditional cultures, including Indigenous Australians. This procedure is sometimes voluntarily sought out by adults and has taken root in Western body modification culture, the modern primitives. People seeking the procedure may or may not have ties to a culture that practices it. Meatotomy is a form that involves splitting of the glans penis alone, while bisection is a more extreme form that splits the penis entirely in half.

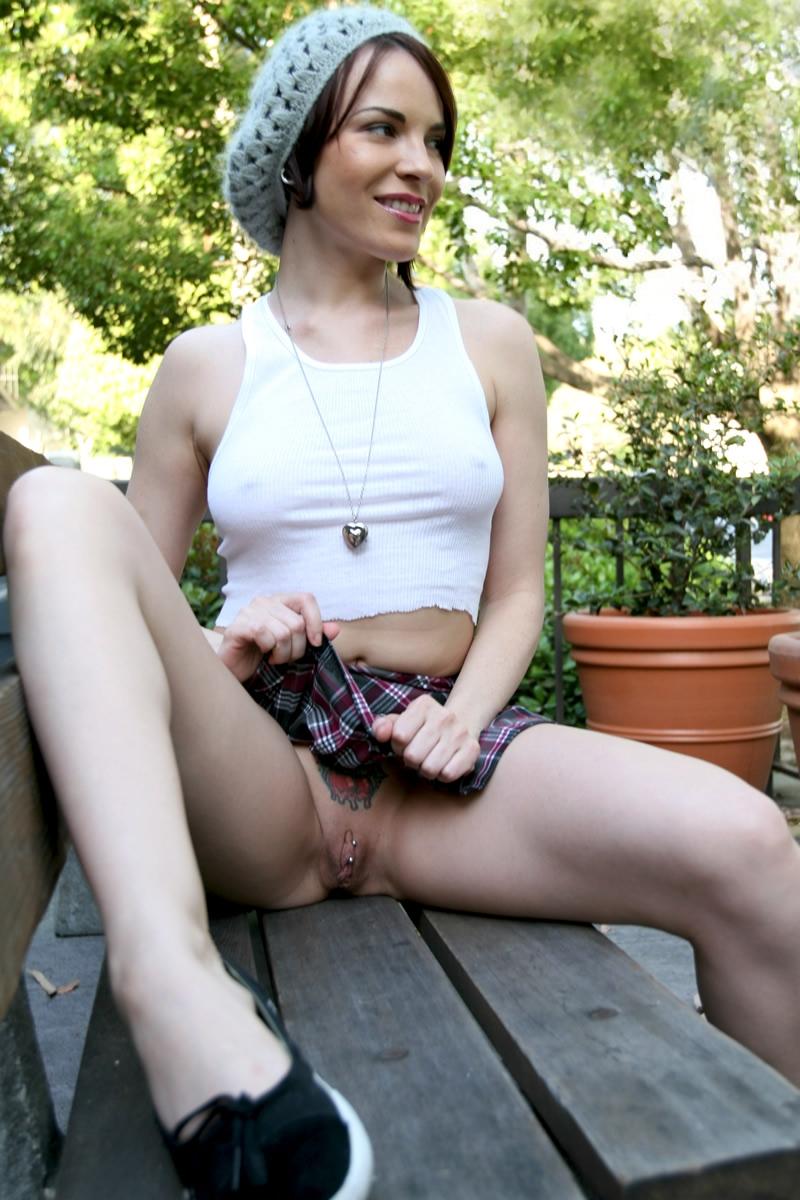
Woman with clitoral hood piercing – Taiwan, 2009

Genital piercings and genital tattooing may be performed for aesthetic reasons, but piercings can have the benefit of increasing sexual pleasure for the pierced individual or their sex partners.

Similarly, pearling involves surgical insertion of small, inert spheres under the skin along the shaft of the penis for the purpose of providing sexual stimulation to the walls of the vagina. Similar to tattooing, genital scarification is primarily done for aesthetic reasons by adding decorative scars to the skin. The genital decoration by scars is an ancient tradition in many cultures, both for men and women.

Clitoris enlargement may be achieved temporarily through the use of a clitoral pump, or it may be achieved permanently through the application or injection of testosterone. Penis enlargement is a term for various techniques used to attempt to increase the size of the penis, though the safety and efficacy of these techniques are debated.

===== Gender-affirming surgery =====
People who are transgender may undergo gender-affirming surgery to alter their genitals to match their gender identity. Not all transgender people elect to have these surgeries.

Some of the surgical procedures are vaginoplasty (creation of a vagina) and vulvoplasty (creation of a vulva) for trans women and metoidioplasty (elongation of the clitoris), phalloplasty (creation of a penis), and scrotoplasty (creation of a scrotum) for trans men. Trans women may also benefit from hair removal and facial feminization surgery, while some trans men may have liposuction to remove fat deposits around their hips and thighs. Hijra, a third gender found in the Indian subcontinent, may opt to undergo castration. In rare cases, a child's gender has been reassigned without their consent due to genital injury, such as David Reimer, who was the subject of John Money's John/Joan case. Similarly, intersex people often benefit from gender-affirming surgeries but are also sometimes subjected to them without consent in a violation of intersex human rights. The specialized term is intersex medical interventions.

===== Nontherapeutic =====
The following types of unvoluntary genital cutting or surgery are sometimes performed on children for nontherapeutic (medically unnecessary) reasons: clitoral reduction surgeries on children with congenital adrenal hyperplasia (CAH), hypospadias surgeries, removal of internal gonads and penile circumcision. In some societies, other types of endosex girl genital cutting happen. They can be done for psychosocial, cultural, subjective-aesthetic, or prophylactic perceived benefits, as judged by doctors or parents.

Penile subincision, or splitting of the underside of the penis, is widespread in the traditional cultures of Indigenous Australian children. This procedure has been adapted for adults in Western body modification culture, the modern primitives. Meatotomy is a form that involves splitting of the glans penis alone, while bisection is a more extreme form that splits the penis entirely in half.

====== Intersex ======
Intersex children and children with ambiguous genitalia may be subjected to surgeries to "normalize" the appearance of their genitalia.

These surgeries are usually performed for cosmetic benefit rather than for therapeutic reasons. Most surgeries involving children with ambiguous genitalia are sexually damaging and may render them infertile. For example, in cases involving male children with micropenis, doctors may recommend the child be reassigned as female. The Intersex Society of North America objects to elective surgeries performed on people without their informed consent on grounds that such surgeries subject patients to unnecessary harm and risk.

==== As sexual violence ====
Genital mutilation is common in some situations of war or armed conflict, with perpetrators using violence against the genitals of men, women, and non-binary people. These different forms of sexual violence can terrorize targeted individuals and communities, prevent individuals from reproducing, and cause tremendous pain and psychological anguish for victims. Many wars, religious conquests, and genocides have involved forced circumcision. A related practice is killing people based on their circumcision status, notably in the Bangladesh genocide and recently in the 2025 India-Pakistan Crisis.

=== As treatment ===
If the genitals become diseased, as in the case of cancer, sometimes the diseased areas are surgically removed. Females may undergo vaginectomy or vulvectomy (to the vagina and vulva, respectively), while males may undergo penectomy or orchiectomy (removal of the penis and testicles, respectively). Reconstructive surgery may be performed to restore what was lost, often with techniques similar to those used in gender-affirming surgery.

During childbirth, an episiotomy (cutting part of the tissue between the vagina and the anus) is sometimes performed to increase the amount of space through which the baby may emerge.

Hymenotomy is the surgical perforation of an imperforate hymen. It may be performed to allow menstruation to occur. An adult individual may opt for increasing the size of their hymenal opening, or removal of the hymen altogether, to facilitate sexual penetration of their vagina.

=== Self-inflicted ===
A person may engage in self-inflicted genital injury or mutilation such as castration, penectomy, or clitoridectomy. The motivation behind such actions vary widely; it may be done due personal crisis related to mental illness, self-mutilation, body dysmorphia, or social reasons. Not all regions have proper transgender health care or gender-affirming surgeries available, which can lead to people attempting self-surgery.

== Female ==
=== Female genital mutilation ===
FGM in Africa, Iraqi Kurdistan and Yemen, as of 2024 (map of Africa)

Female genital mutilation (FGM), also known as female genital cutting (FGC), female circumcision, or female genital mutilation/cutting (FGM/C), refers to "all procedures involving partial or total removal of the external female genitalia or other surgery of the female genital organs whether for cultural, religious or other non-therapeutic reasons." It is not the same as the procedures used in gender-affirming surgery or the genital modification of intersex persons.

It is practiced in several parts of the world, but the practice is concentrated more heavily in Africa, most of the Middle East, and some other parts of Asia. Over 125 million women and girls have experienced FGM in the 29 countries in which it is concentrated. Over eight million have been infibulated, a practice found largely in Djibouti, Eritrea, Somalia and Sudan. Infibulation, the most extreme form of FGM (known as Type III), consists of the removal of the inner and outer labia and closure of the vulva, while a small hole is left for the passage of urine and menstrual blood; afterwards the vagina will be opened after the wedding for sexual intercourse and childbirth (see episiotomy). In the past several decades, efforts have been made by global health organizations, such as the WHO, to end the practice. FGM is condemned by international human rights organizations. The Istanbul Convention prohibits FGM (Article 38).

FGM is considered a form of violence against women by the Declaration on the Elimination of Violence Against Women, which was adopted by the United Nations in 1993; it states: "Article Two: Violence against women shall be understood to encompass, but not be limited to, the following: (a) Physical, sexual and psychological violence occurring in the family, including ... female genital mutilation ...". However, because of its importance in traditional life, it continues to be practised in many societies.

=== Hymenorrhaphy ===
Hymenorrhaphy refers to the practice of thickening the hymen, or, in some cases, implanting a capsule of red liquid within the newly created vaginal tissue. This new hymen is created to cause physical resistance, blood, or the appearance of blood, at the time that the individual's new partner inserts his penis into her vagina. This is done in cultures where a high value is placed on female virginity at the time of marriage. In these cultures, a woman may be punished, perhaps violently, if the community leaders deem that she was not a virgin when her marriage was consummated. Individuals who are victims of rape, who were virginal at the time of their rape, may elect for hymenorrhaphy.

=== Labia stretching ===
Labia stretching is the act of elongating the labia minora through manual manipulation (pulling) or physical equipment (such as weights). It is a familial cultural practice in Rwanda, common in Sub-Saharan Africa, and a body modification practice elsewhere. It is performed for sexual enhancement of both partners, aesthetics, symmetry and gratification.

=== Vulvoplasty and vaginoplasty ===
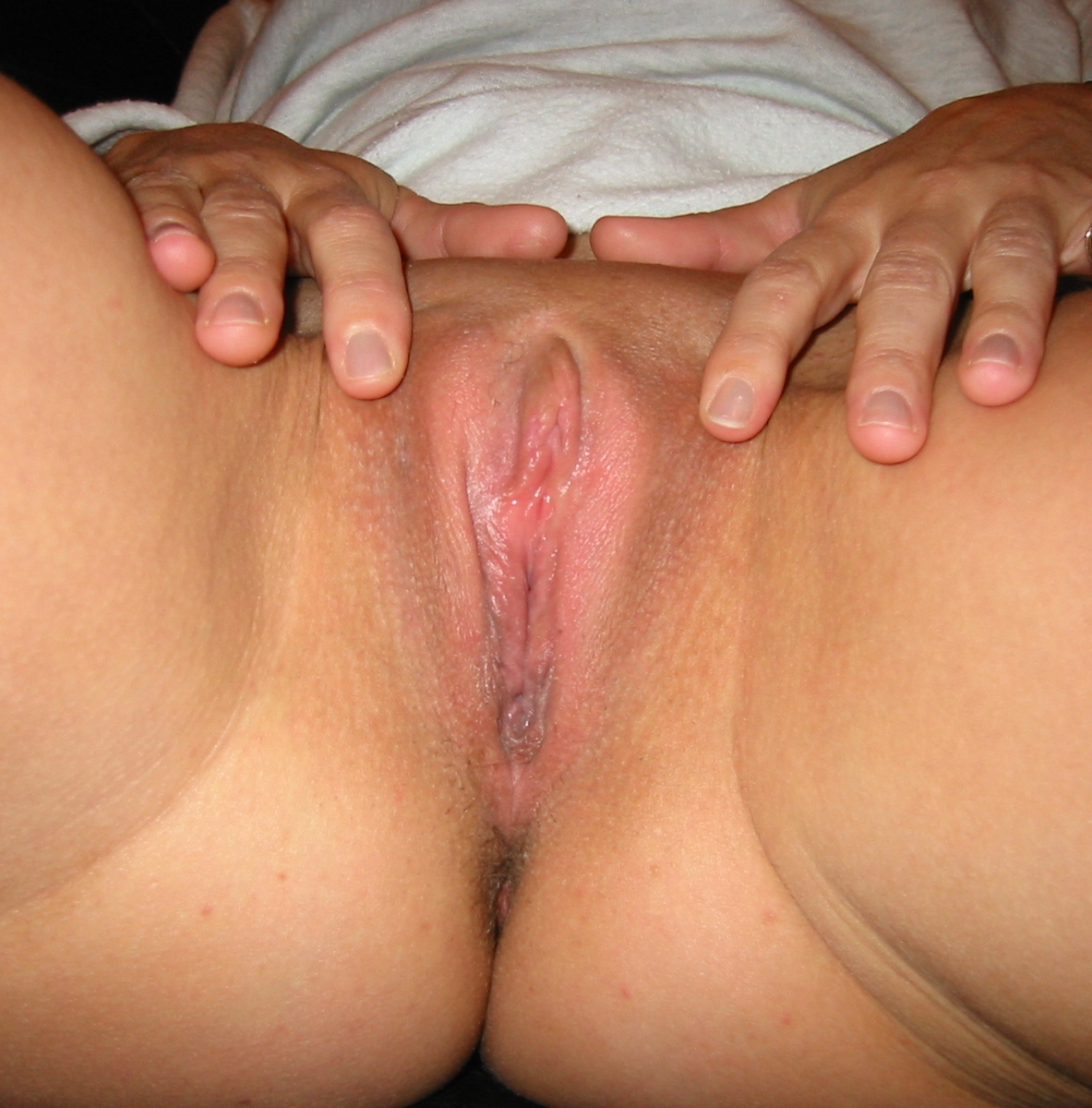
Vulva with labia minora surgically removed

Some women undergo vaginoplasty or vulvoplasty procedures to alter the shape of their vulvas to meet personal or societal aesthetic standards. The cosmetic surgery of female genitalia, also known as elective genitoplasty, is controversial amongst Gender and Women's Studies scholars, with opponents pejoratively referring to the procedures as "designer vaginas". In May 2007, an article published in the British Medical Journal strongly criticised this craze, citing its popularity being rooted in commercial and media influences. Similar concerns have been expressed in Australia.

In the article "Designer Vaginas" by Simone Weil Davis, she talks about the modification of woman's vagina and the outside influences women are pressured with, which can cause them to feel shame towards their labia minora. She states that the media, such as pornography, creates an unhealthy view of what a "good looking vagina" is and how women feel that their privates are inferior and are therefore pressured to act upon that mindset. These insecurities are forced upon women by their partners and other women as well. Also leading to a surge of these types of procedures is increased interest in non-surgical genital alterations, such as Brazilian waxing, that make the vulva more visible to judgment. The incentive to participate in vulvo- and vaginoplasty may also come about in an effort to manage women's physical attributes and their sexual behavior, treating their vagina as something needing to be managed or controlled and ultimately deemed "acceptable".

=== Clitoral enlargement methods ===
Bottom growth is a phrase that many transgender people use to describe the process of clitoral hypertrophy, or the clitoris growing in length and width while taking testosterone. Typical bottom growth on testosterone therapy is approximately 1 to 4 cm. Typical guidance is that maximum growth is reached in the first year to three years, but this depends heavily on the individual and their Testosterone route and dosage. A clitoral pump can be used to increase the size of bottom growth. Clitoral pumps can be used before starting Testosterone or while on Testosterone.

=== Clitoral hood reduction ===
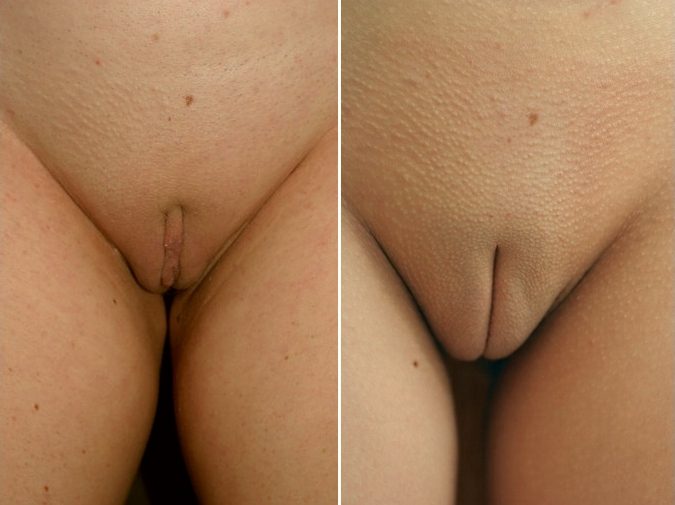
Clitoral hood reduction

Clitoral hood reduction is a form of hoodplasty. When performed with the consent of the adult individual, it can be considered an elective plastic surgery procedure for reducing the size and the area of the clitoral hood (prepuce) in order to further expose the glans of the clitoris; the therapeutic goal is thought to improve the sexual functioning of the woman, and the aesthetic appeal of her vulva. The reduction of the clitoral prepuce tissues usually is a sub-ordinate surgery within a labiaplasty procedure for reducing the labia minora; and occasionally within a vaginoplasty procedure. When these procedures are performed on individuals without their consent, they are considered a form of female genital mutilation.

== Male ==
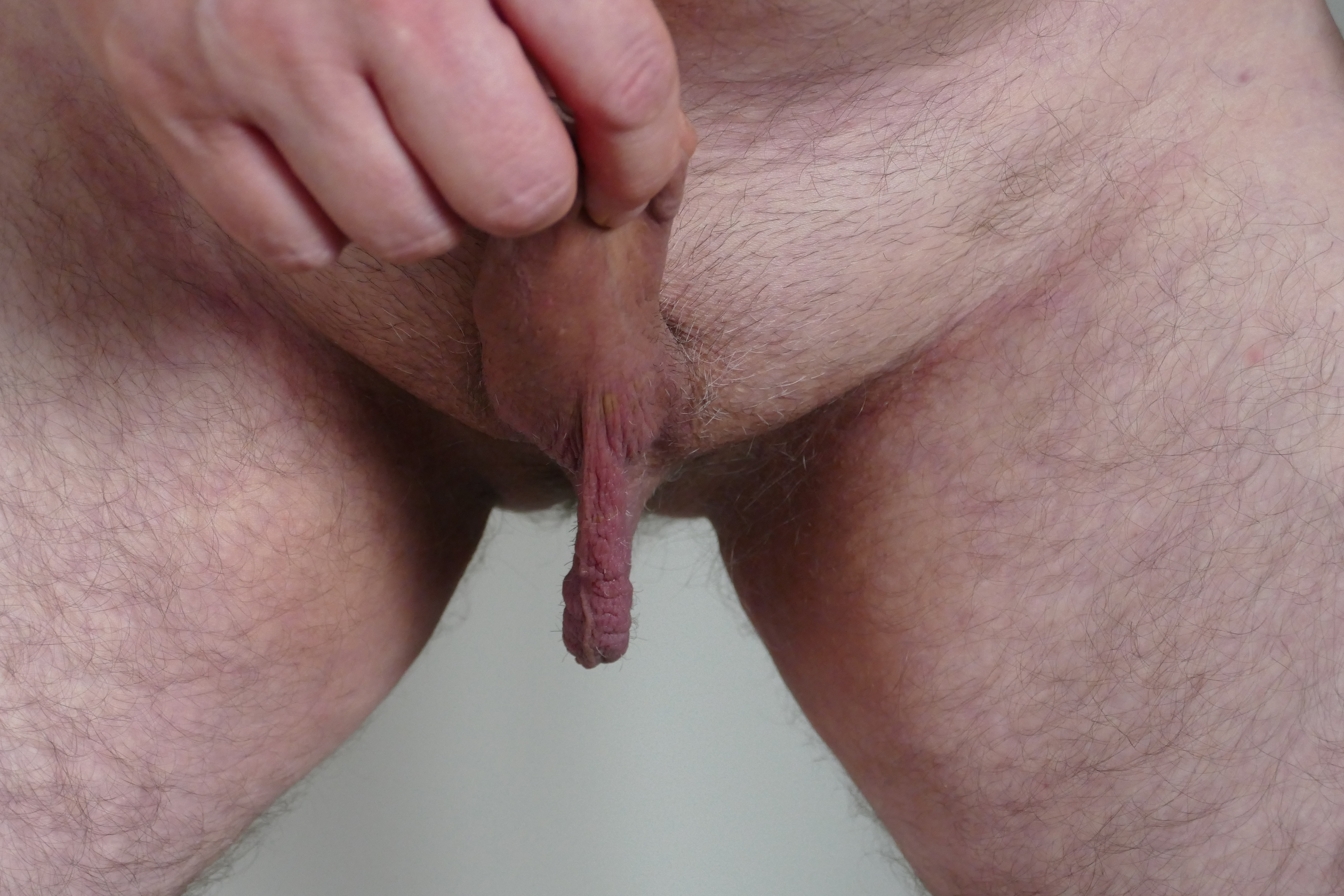
An empty scrotum showing no testicles after castration.

=== Castration ===
Castration in the genital modification and mutilation context is the removal of the testicles. Occasionally the term is also used to refer to penis removal, but that is less common. Castration has been performed in many cultures throughout history, but is now rare. It should not be confused with chemical castration.

The removal of one testicle (sometimes referred to as unilateral castration) is usually done in the modern world only for medical reasons.

=== Circumcision ===
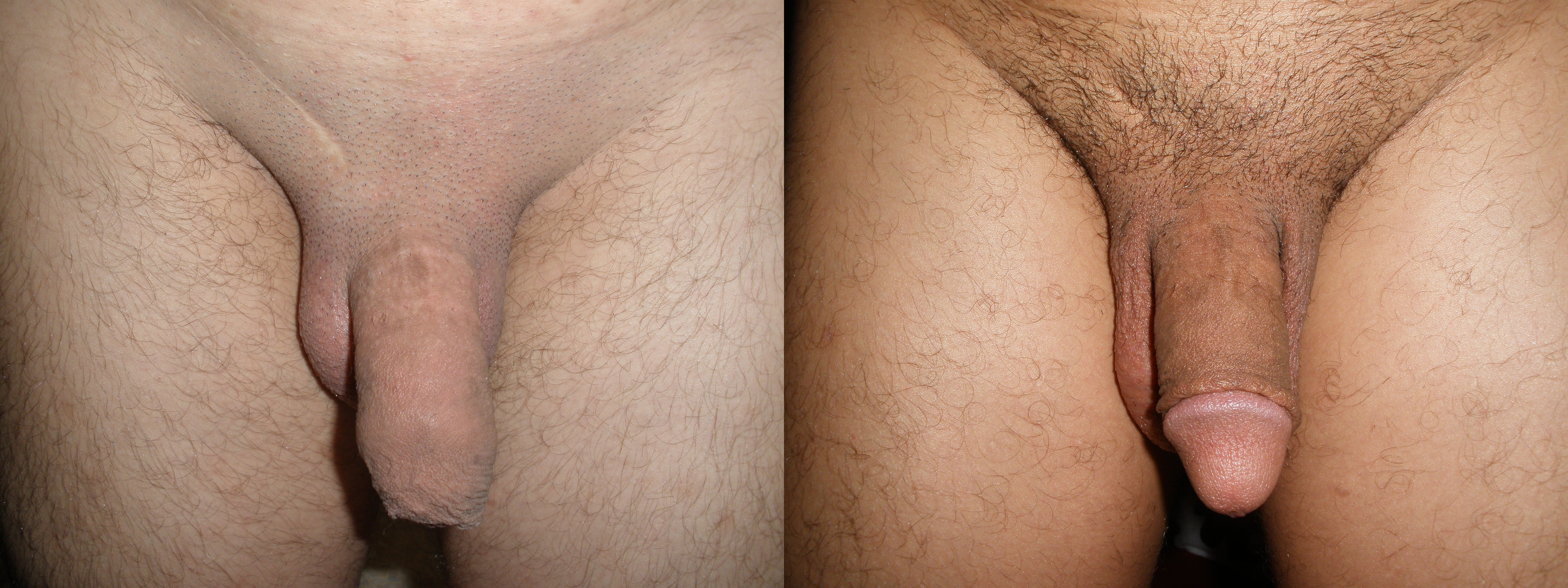
Penis before and after circumcision

Circumcision is the removal of the foreskin, the double-layered fold of skin, mucosal and muscular tissue at the distal end of the human penis. Around half of all circumcisions worldwide are performed for reasons of preventive healthcare; half for religious or cultural reasons. Circumcision involves either a conventional "cut and stitch" surgical procedure or use of a circumcision instrument or device. Complications are rare. Opponents, particularly of routine neonatal circumcision, question its preventive efficacy and object to subjecting non-consenting newborn males to a procedure that is potentially harmful, in their view, with little to no benefit, as well as violating their human rights and possibly negatively impacting their sex life. There is a consensus among the world's major medical organizations and in the academic literature that circumcision is an efficacious intervention for HIV prevention in high-risk populations if carried out by medical professionals under safe conditions. They hold variant perspectives on the prophylactic efficacy of the elective circumcision of minors in developed nations. No major medical organization recommends circumcision for all newborns, but few countries ban the practice.

=== Foreskin restoration ===
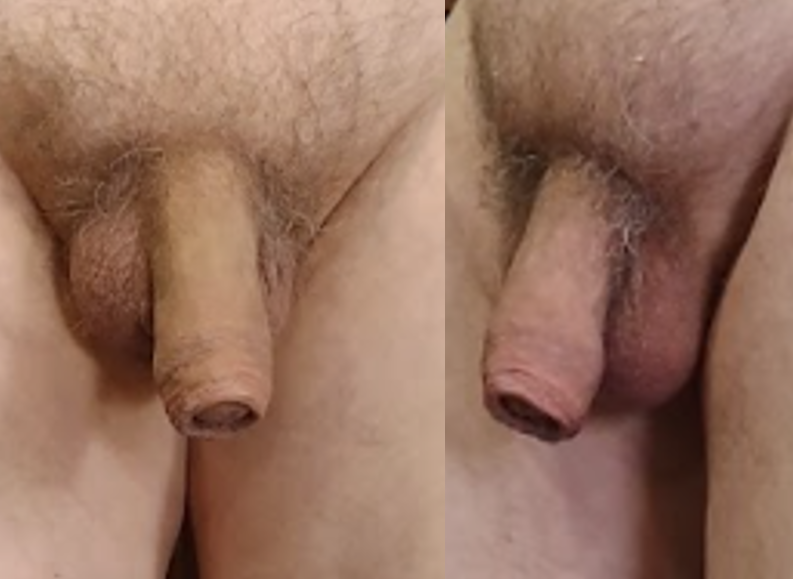
Circumcised at birth, the foreskin has been restored over years of foreskin restoration.

Foreskin restoration and reconstruction are techniques for the recreation of the foreskin after its removal by circumcision or injury.

Nonsurgical restoration involves tissue expansion by stretching the penile skin forward over the glans penis with the aid of tension, either by hand or with a restoration device. Surgical reconstruction often involves grafting skin taken from the scrotum onto a portion of the penile shaft.

=== Infibulation ===
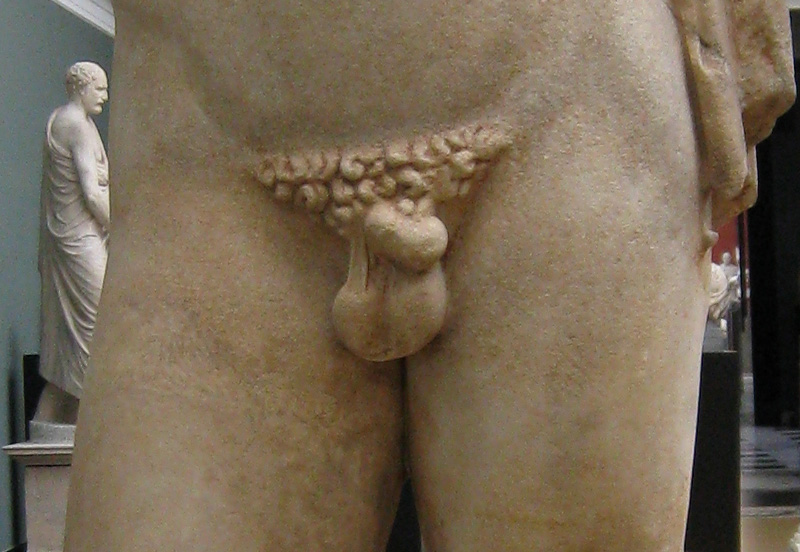
The Greek poet Anacreon (582–485 BC), showing kynodesmē

Infibulation literally means "to close with a clasp or a pin.” The word is used to include suturing of the foreskin over the head of the penis.

Early Greek infibulation consisted of tying the most distal portion of the foreskin with kynodesme to conceal the glans. The kynodesmē was also used by the Etruscans and Romans (ligatura praeputii), but the Romans preferred to apply a gold, silver, or bronze ring (annulus), a metal clasp (fibula) or pin. Use of a kynodesmē may also permanently lengthen the foreskin over time which was seen as proper and desirable.

In modern times, male infibulation may be performed for personal preferences or as part of BDSM.

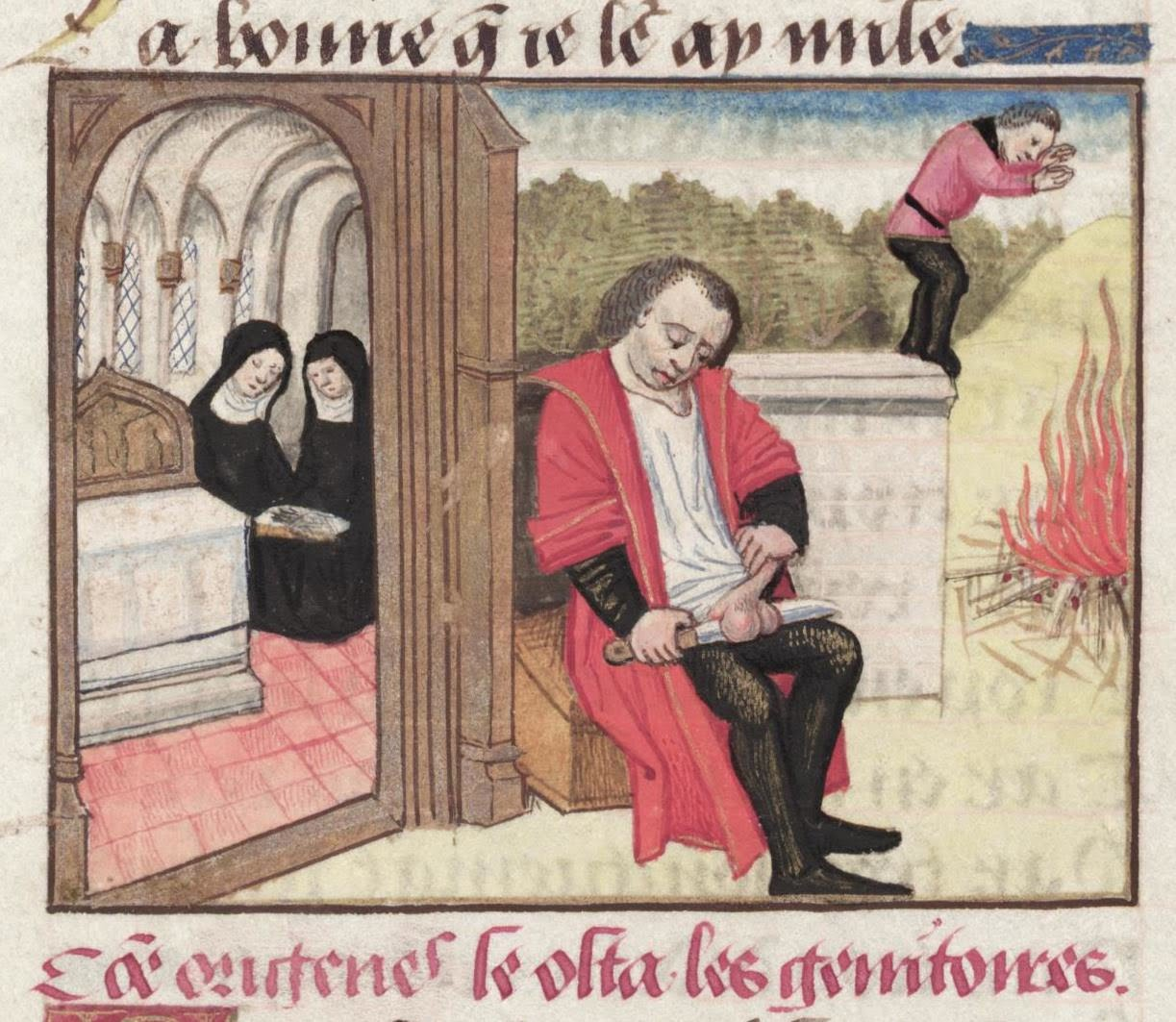
Illustration of a male emasculating himself.

=== Emasculation ===
Emasculation is the removal of both the penis and the testicles, the external male sex organs. It differs from castration, which is the removal of the testicles only, although the terms are sometimes used interchangeably.

Genital nullification is a procedure practiced in a body modification subculture made up mostly of men who have had their genitals surgically removed. Those undergoing the procedure often go by the name of nullos, and are not necessarily transgender or nonbinary; some identify as eunuchs. The term nullo is short for genital nullification. Though the procedure is mostly sought by men, female genital mutilation may be referred to as clitoral nullification.

In modern-day South Asia, some members of hijra communities reportedly undergo emasculation. It is called nirwaan and seen as a rite of passage.

It was part of the eunuch-making of the Chinese court, and it was widespread in the Arab slave trade. A castrated slave was worth more, and this offset the losses from death.

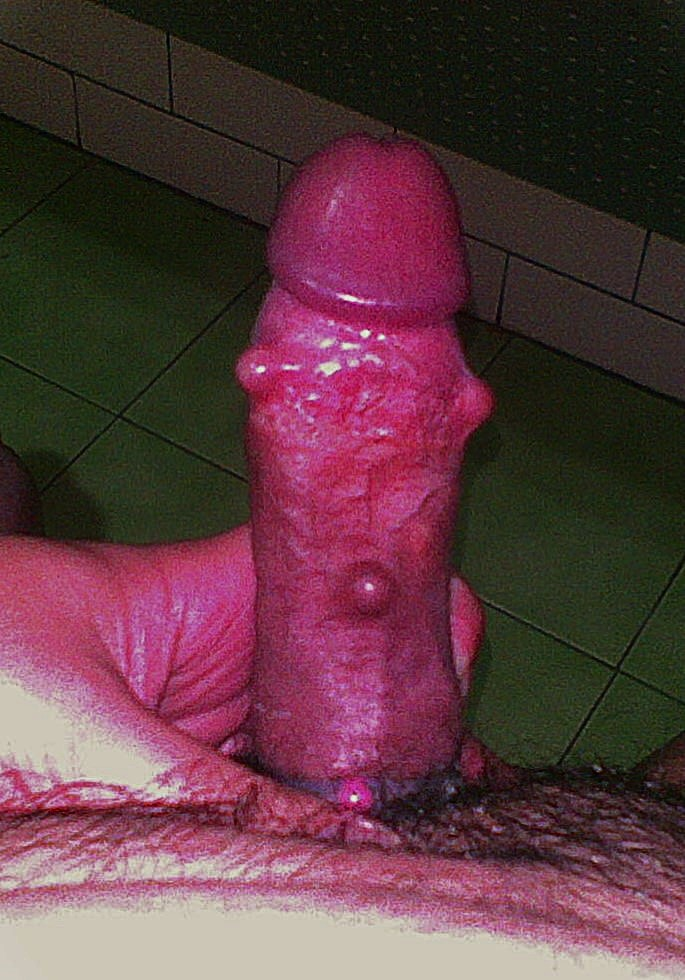
An erect penis with pearls inserted under the skin.

=== Pearling ===
Pearling or genital beading is a form of body modification, the practice of permanently inserting small beads made of various materials beneath the skin of the genitals—of the labia, or of the shaft or foreskin of the penis. As well as being an aesthetic practice, this is usually intended to enhance the sexual pleasure of the receptive partner(s) during vaginal or anal intercourse.

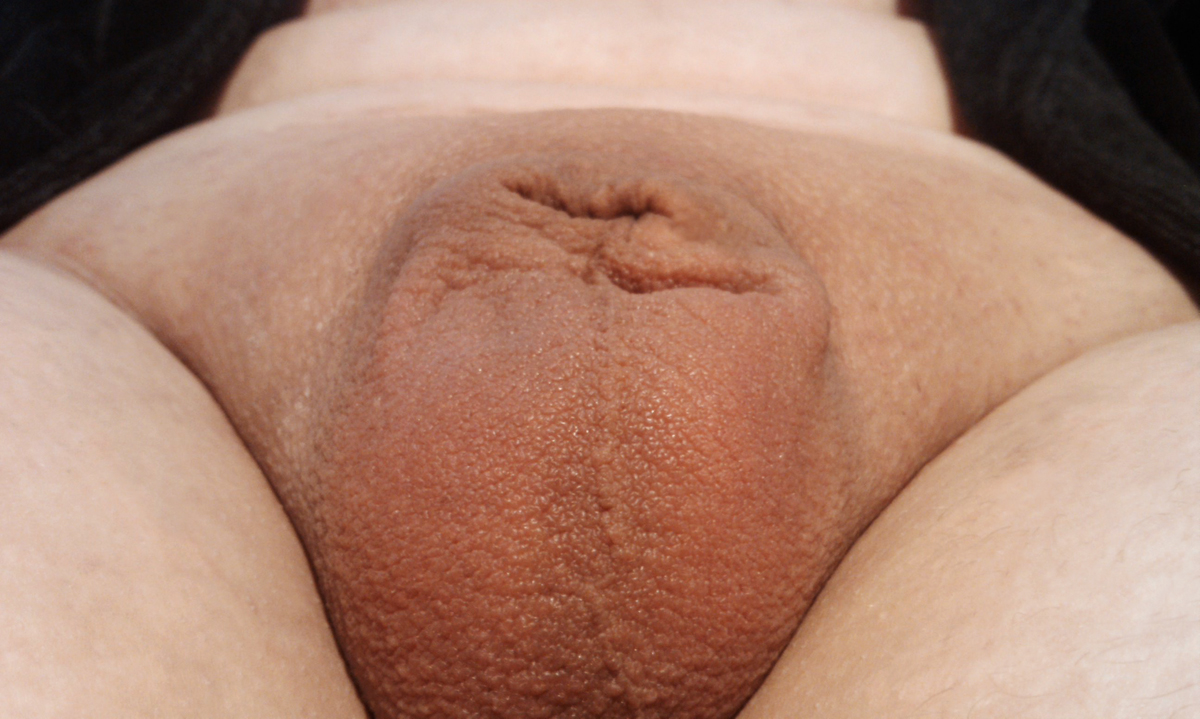
An adult male who has undergone penectomy for medical reasons.

=== Penectomy ===
Penectomy involves the partial or total amputation of the penis. Sometimes, the removal of the entire penis was done in conjunction with castration, or incorrectly referred to as castration. Removing the penis was often performed on eunuchs and high ranking men who would frequently be in contact with women, such as those belonging to a harem. The hijra of India may remove their penis as an expression of their gender identity. In the medical field, removal of the penis may be performed for reasons of gangrene or cancer.

In the ulwaluko circumcision ceremony, which is performed by spear, accidental penectomy is a serious risk.

In the United States in 1907 Bertha Boronda sliced off her husband's penis with a straight razor. Lorena Bobbit infamously removed her husband's penis in 1993. In the latter case, the use of microsurgery was able to reattach Bobbitt's penis.

=== Penile subincision/meatotomy ===
Penile subincision is a form of genital modification involving a urethrotomy and vertically slitting the underside of the penis from the meatus towards to the base. It was performed on children by people of some cultures, such as the Indigenous Australians, the Arrente, the Luritja, the Samburu, the Samoans, and the Native Hawaiians. Indigenous Australians also perform circumcision as a prerequisite for subincision. It may also be performed for personal preference. Subincision always cuts all the way through the underside of the meatus or tip of the penis, different styles can go different lengths along the shaft towards the base as well. Penile subincision may leave a man with an increased risk of sexually transmitted diseases, issues with fertility (due to lack of control over what direction the sperm goes after ejaculation), and may require a man to sit down while urinating. When the surgery is not performed in a hospital or by a licensed medical professional, complications such as infection, exsanguination, or permanent damage are major concerns.

=== Penile superincision ===
A dorsal slit (also known as superincision) is an incision made along the upper length of the foreskin with the intention to expose the glans penis without removing skin or tissue.

The practice appears to have occurred in Ancient Egypt, though not commonly:

A few examples of Old Kingdom... statuary present some adult males—usually priests, functionaries, or low-status workers—as having undergone a vertical slit on the dorsal aspect of the prepuce, although no flesh has been removed.

It may be performed as a part of traditional customs, such as those in the Pacific Islands and the Philippines. In the medical field, it may be performed for as an alternative to circumcision when circumcision is undesired or impractical. It remains a rare surgery and practice overall.
