= Penis transplantation =

Surgical transplant procedure in which a penis is transplanted to a patient

- ICD-9-CM: 64.98

Penis transplantation is a surgical transplant procedure in which a penis is transplanted to a patient. The penis may be an allograft from a human donor, or it may be grown artificially, though the latter has not yet been transplanted onto a human.

== Cases ==
=== 2006 allotransplant procedure ===
The first such procedure was performed in September 2006 at a military hospital in Guangzhou, China. The patient, a 44-year-old male, had sustained the loss of most of his penis in an accident. The transplanted penis came from a brain-dead 22-year-old male. Although a surgical success, the patient and his wife developed psychological trauma as a result of the procedure, and had the surgery reversed 15 days later. Following this, Jean-Michel Dubernard, who performed the world's first face transplant, wrote that the case "raises many questions and has some critics". He alluded to a double standard, writing:

"I cannot imagine what would have been the reactions of the medical profession, ethics specialists, and the media if a European surgical team had performed the same operation."

An example of a critic is Piet Hoebeke, a reconstructive urologist in Belgium, who wrote a letter that raised the question of whether or not ethics committees were involved, and criticized the group for the follow-up time of only 15 days. Hoebeke asserted that successful voiding at two weeks is not predictive of long-term outcomes, and even that inadequate arterial anastomoses might not manifest themselves in this time. The hospital that performed the first transplantation later issued a set of guidelines which, among other considerations, "recommended that the procedure be restricted to individuals with severe injuries who are unwilling to undergo traditional reconstructive surgery", according to a mini-review of the ethical issues surrounding penis transplantation published in the Asian Journal of Andrology.

=== 2014 procedure in South Africa ===
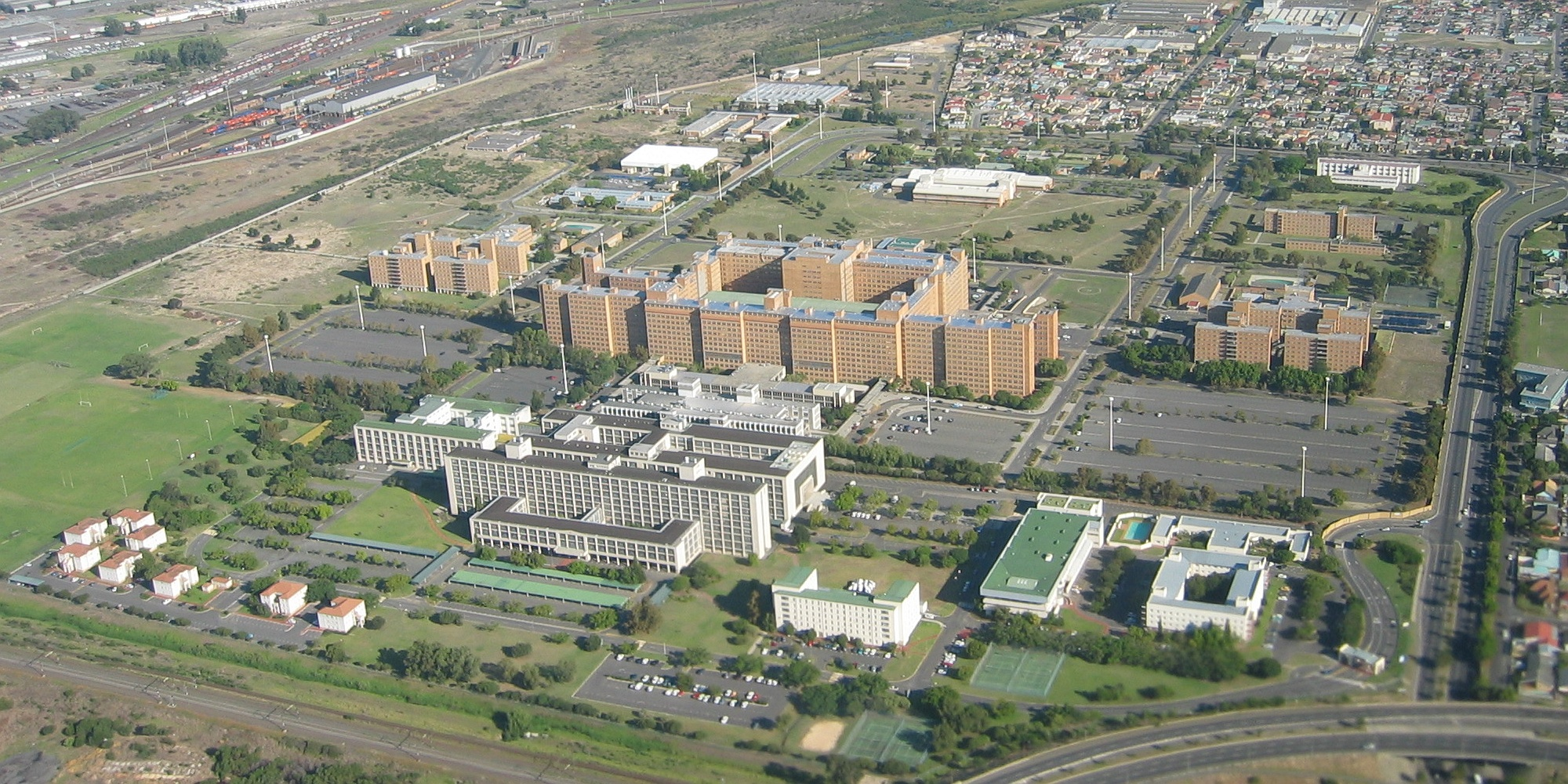
The first successful penis transplant was performed at Stellenbosch University in South Africa (medical campus pictured).

In December 2014, the first successful penis transplant was performed on a 21-year-old man by specialists led by urologist André van der Merwe from the University of Stellenbosch in South Africa. The surgical team consisted of urologist André van der Merwe and plastic surgeon Frank Graewe. The immunosuppression was conducted by Rafique Moosa. The nine-hour procedure used microsurgery to connect blood vessels and nerves. The patient had lost his penis as a result of a botched circumcision procedure he underwent aged 18. As of 13 March 2015, the recipient was reported to have recovered function in the organ, including urination, erection, orgasm and ejaculation, but sensation was expected to take two years to return fully. The doctors who performed the transplant were surprised by this, as they had not expected the patient to recover fully until about December 2016. Given that circumcisions are performed frequently in parts of South Africa for cultural and/or religious reasons, and these are often unsanitary procedures, frequently carried out by uncertified amateurs, doctors have said that South Africa has some of the greatest need for penis transplantations in the world. In 2015, the recipient announced that he had successfully conceived a child.

=== 2016 Massachusetts General Hospital procedure ===
In May 2016 surgeons, co-led by Curtis L. Cetrulo Jr. and Dicken S. C. Ko at Massachusetts General Hospital, Harvard Medical School performed a transplant on a 64-year-old man from Halifax, Massachusetts. The surgeons demonstrated that it was possible to perform penile transplantation using a new technique of genitourinary vascularized composite allografts (GUVCA) to replace lost tissue under conventional immunosuppressive medication. The clinical results of this pioneering procedure in reconstructive transplantation in the United States was published in Annals of Surgery, May 2017.

In October 2020 doctors from Massachusetts General Hospital debated penis transplants in transgender patients.

=== 2017 procedure in South Africa ===
A surgical team from Stellenbosch University and the Tygerberg Academic Hospital performed a second penis transplant on 21 April 2017.

In a nine and a half hour procedure, André van der Merwe and his team successfully transplanted a penis onto a 40-year-old male who had lost his penis 17 years prior, in a botched traditional circumcision. The patient is set to receive medical skin darkening tattoos in order to correct skin tone differences, as the donor was white and the recipient black.

Stellenbosch University is the only medical center in the world to have successfully completed two penile transplants.

=== Johns Hopkins program ===
In December 2015, The New York Times reported that surgeons from Johns Hopkins School of Medicine in Baltimore would soon be performing experimental penis transplantation surgeries on injured veterans, and were optimistic that such surgeries could result in sexual and reproductive function.

In April 2018, The New York Times reported that surgeons from Johns Hopkins, led by Richard Redett, MD, had performed the first penis transplant performed on a combat survivor and the third successful penis transplant so far. This transplant also included the scrotum, but not the testicles, for ethical reasons. The patient's identity was not disclosed.

=== Serbia ===
Miroslav Djordjevic is working on a research project that is exploring the feasibility of penile transplantation for the purpose of gender-affirming surgery.

== Laboratory-grown penises ==
In 2009, Anthony Atala and colleagues at the Wake Forest Institute for Regenerative Medicine in North Carolina transplanted bioengineered penises onto 12 rabbits. All of them mated and four produced offspring. It was a test for a concept he had been working on since 1992, with the aim of making human penises for transplant. He has since produced test versions of bioengineered human penises. While there have been multiple successful transplants of other bioengineered organs, including the urethra, transplantation of a complete bioengineered penis has not yet been attempted in humans.

== In fiction ==
The British science fiction comedies, Percy (1971) and Percy's Progress, also known as It's Not the Size That Counts (1974) depict the world's first penis transplant. Ralph Thomas directed both films, and the first was co-written by Michael Palin and featured music by The Kinks.

== See also ==
- Penectomy, surgical amputation of the penis
- Phalloplasty, surgical reconstruction of the penis
