= Penectomy =

Medical removal of the penis

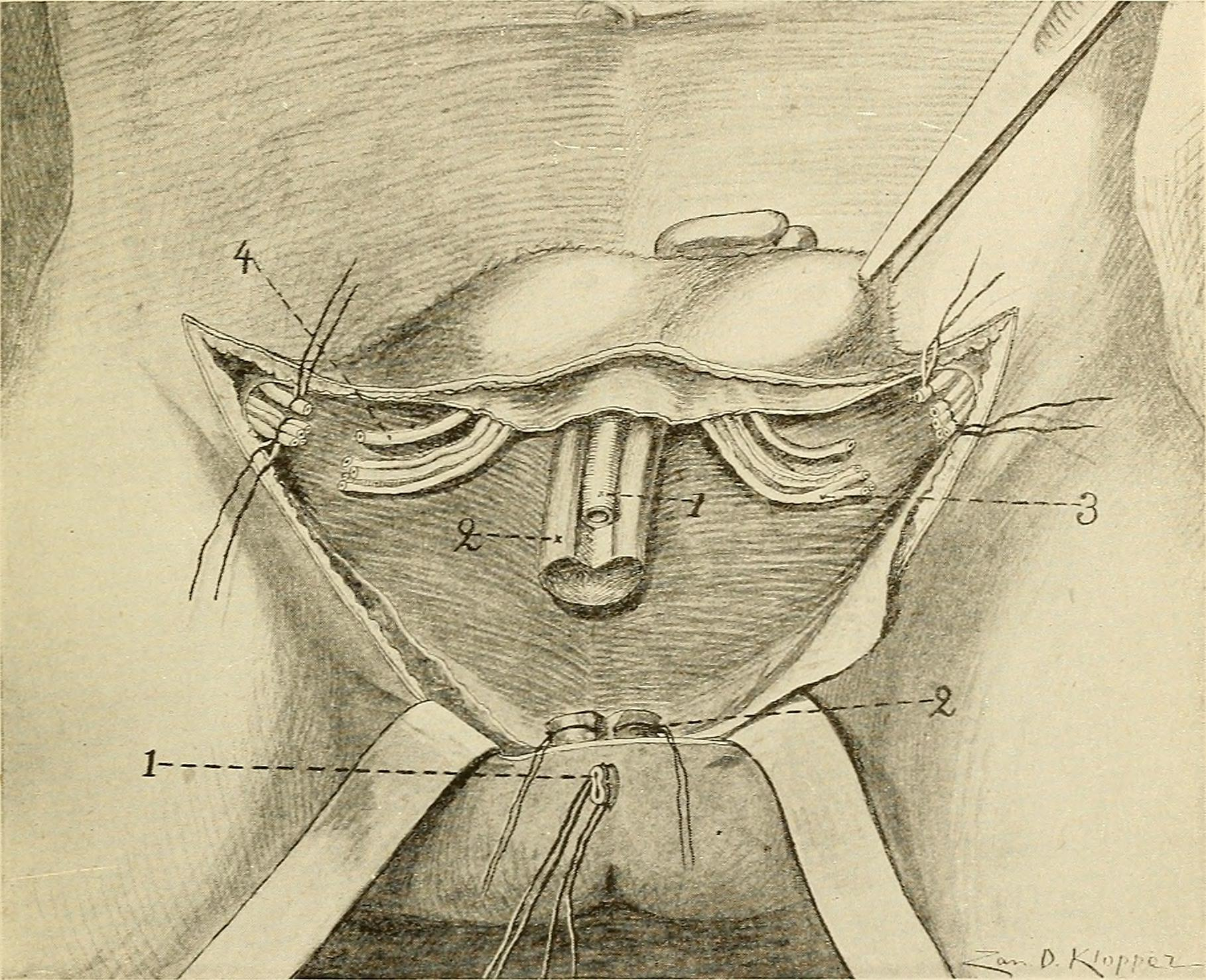
- Diagram of a penectomy
- Specialty: Urology

Penectomy is penis removal through surgery, generally for medical or personal reasons.

== Medical reasons ==
Cancer, for example, sometimes necessitates removal of part or all of the penis. The amount of penis removed depends on the severity of the cancer. Some men have only the tip of their penis removed. For others with more advanced cancer, the entire penis must be removed.

In rare instances, a botched circumcision can also result in a full or partial penectomy, as with David Reimer.

Fournier gangrene can also be a reason for penectomy and/or orchiectomy.

=== Follow-up support ===
Because of the rarity of cancers which require the partial or total removal of the penis, support from people who have had the penis removed can be difficult to find locally. Website support networks are available. For instance, the American Cancer Society's Cancer Survivors Network website provides information for finding support networks. Phalloplasty is also an option for surgical reconstruction of a penis.

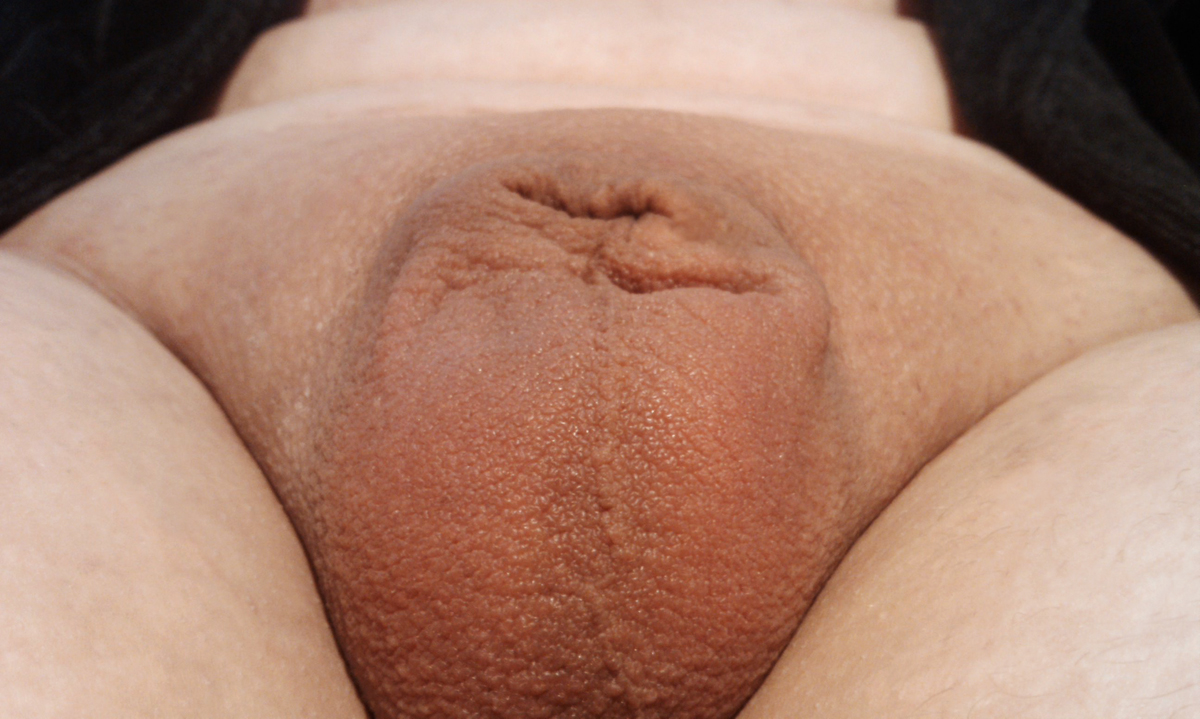
Genital area of male after partial penectomy

=== Sexual support ===
Patients who have undergone a partial penectomy as a result of a penile cancer diagnosis have reported similar sexual outcomes as prior to surgery. Sexual support therapists and specialists are available nationally in the United States and can be accessed through the specialist cancer services. Many surgeons or hospitals will also provide this information postoperatively. Local government health services departments may be able to provide advice, names, and contact numbers.

== See also ==
- Metoidioplasty
- Nullo (body modification)
- Penis transplantation
- Phalloplasty
- Sex reassignment surgery (male-to-female)
