= Perthes =

Perthes is the name of three communes in France:

- Perthes, Ardennes, in the Ardennes département
- Perthes, Haute-Marne, in the Haute-Marne département
- Perthes, Seine-et-Marne, in the Seine-et-Marne département

As a German surname:

- Friedrich Christoph Perthes (1772–1843); publisher
- Georg Perthes (1869–1927); surgeon
- Justus Perthes (1749–1816); publisher, uncle of Friedrich Christoph Perthes

It may also refer to:

- Perthes-lès-Brienne, in the Aube département
- Perthes test, clinical test, done in surgery

== See also ==
- Legg–Calvé–Perthes disease
