= Genital nullification =

Surgical procedure

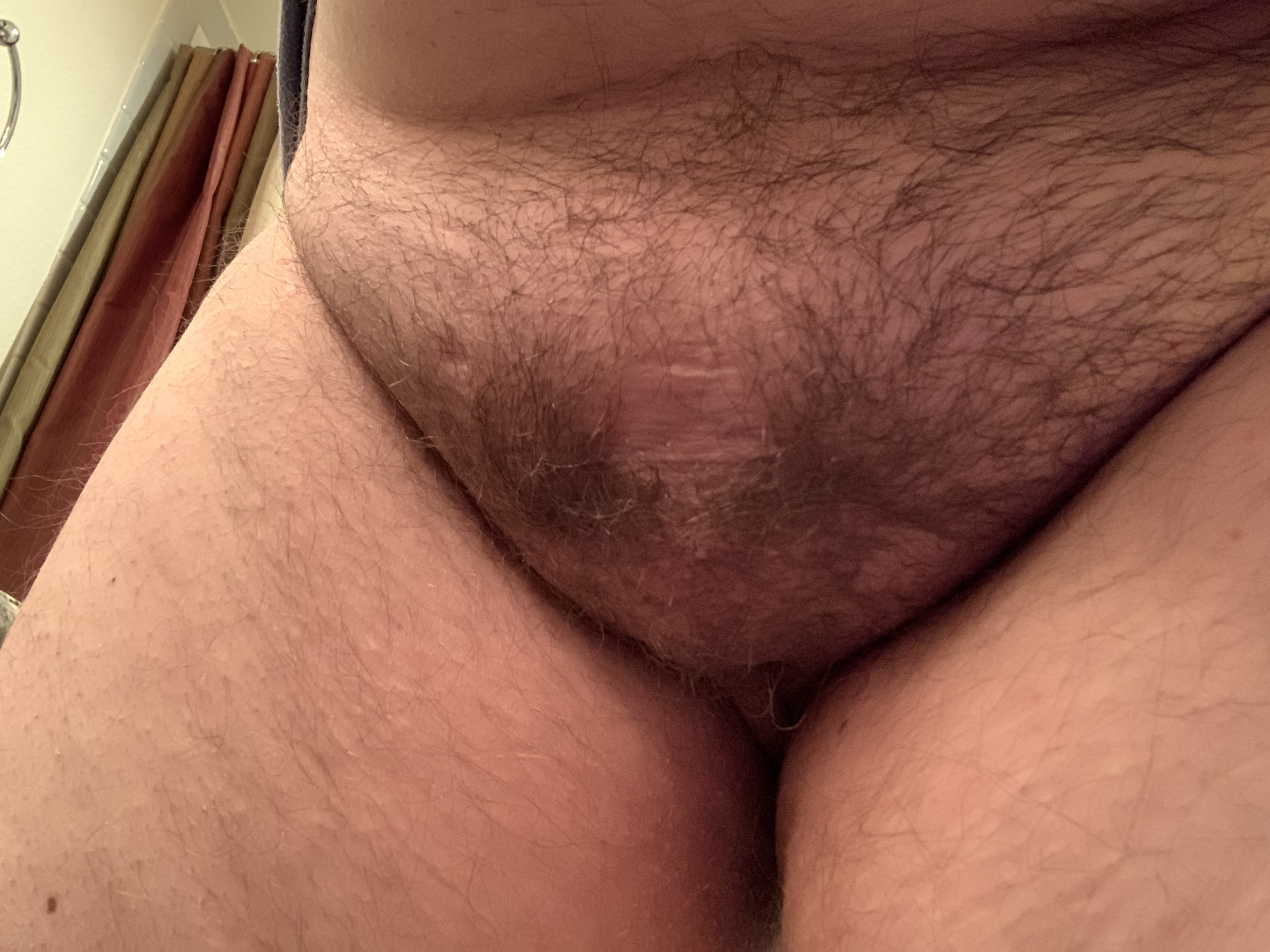
A person assigned male at birth one year after genital nullification surgery

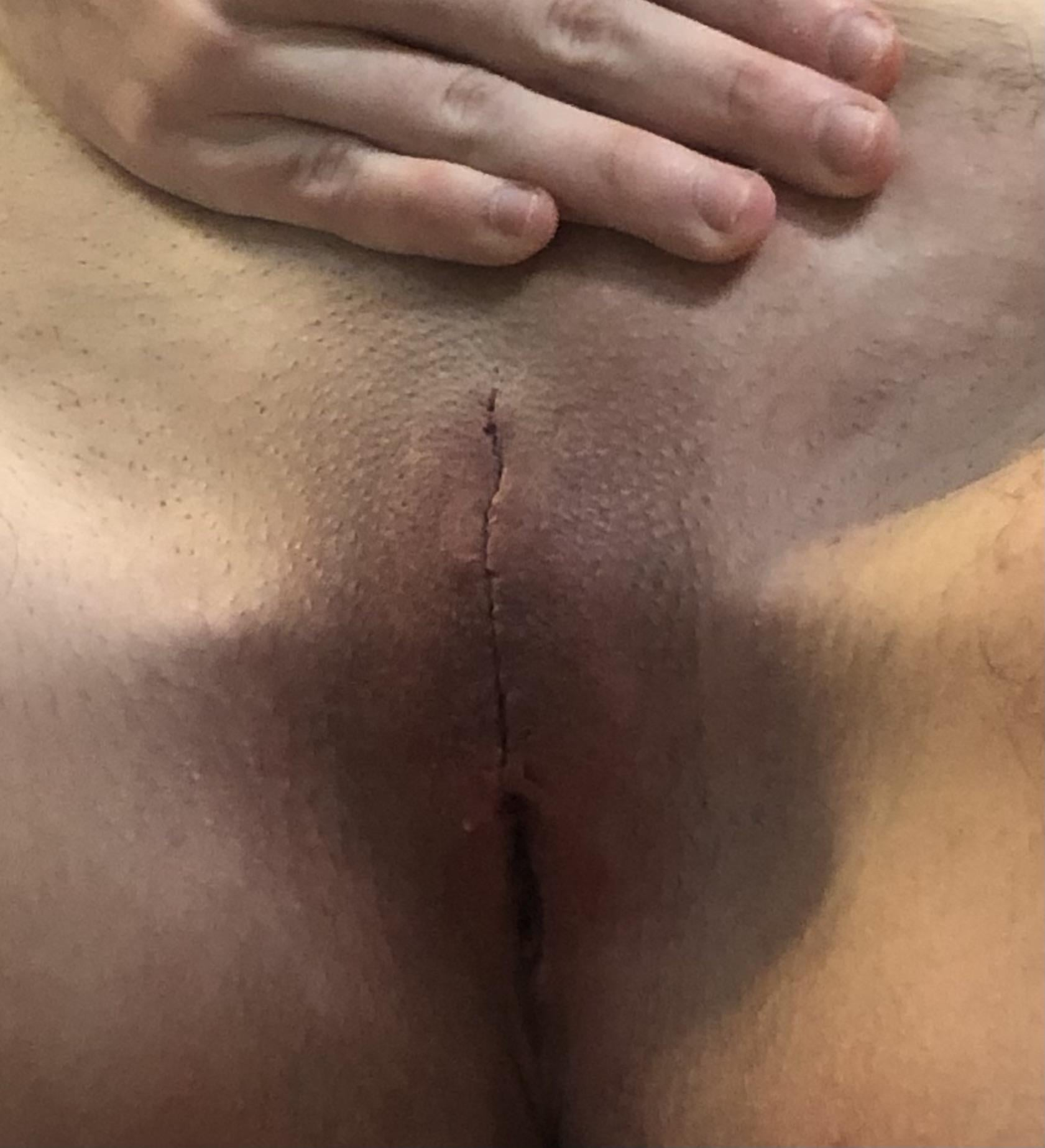
A person assigned female at birth four weeks after genital nullification surgery

Genital nullification, also known as gender nullification surgery or simply nullification, refers to surgical procedures which result in the removal of all genitalia. It may be performed as a form of gender affirming care for transgender and gender diverse individuals, as body modification for aesthetic purposes, or as a sexual practice. Genital nullification is an uncommon procedure for which limited scientific literature is available. It may take place as a single or multi-stage procedure, with surgical methods varying based on patient anatomy and goals – a nullification procedure may involve penectomy, orchiectomy, scrotectomy, vaginectomy, hysterectomy, salpingo-oophorectomy, and/or urethrostomy. Genital nullification is an irreversible procedure with significant impacts on sexual, reproductive, and urinary function. Individuals who have received or wish to pursue nullification are sometimes known as nullos.

== Procedure ==
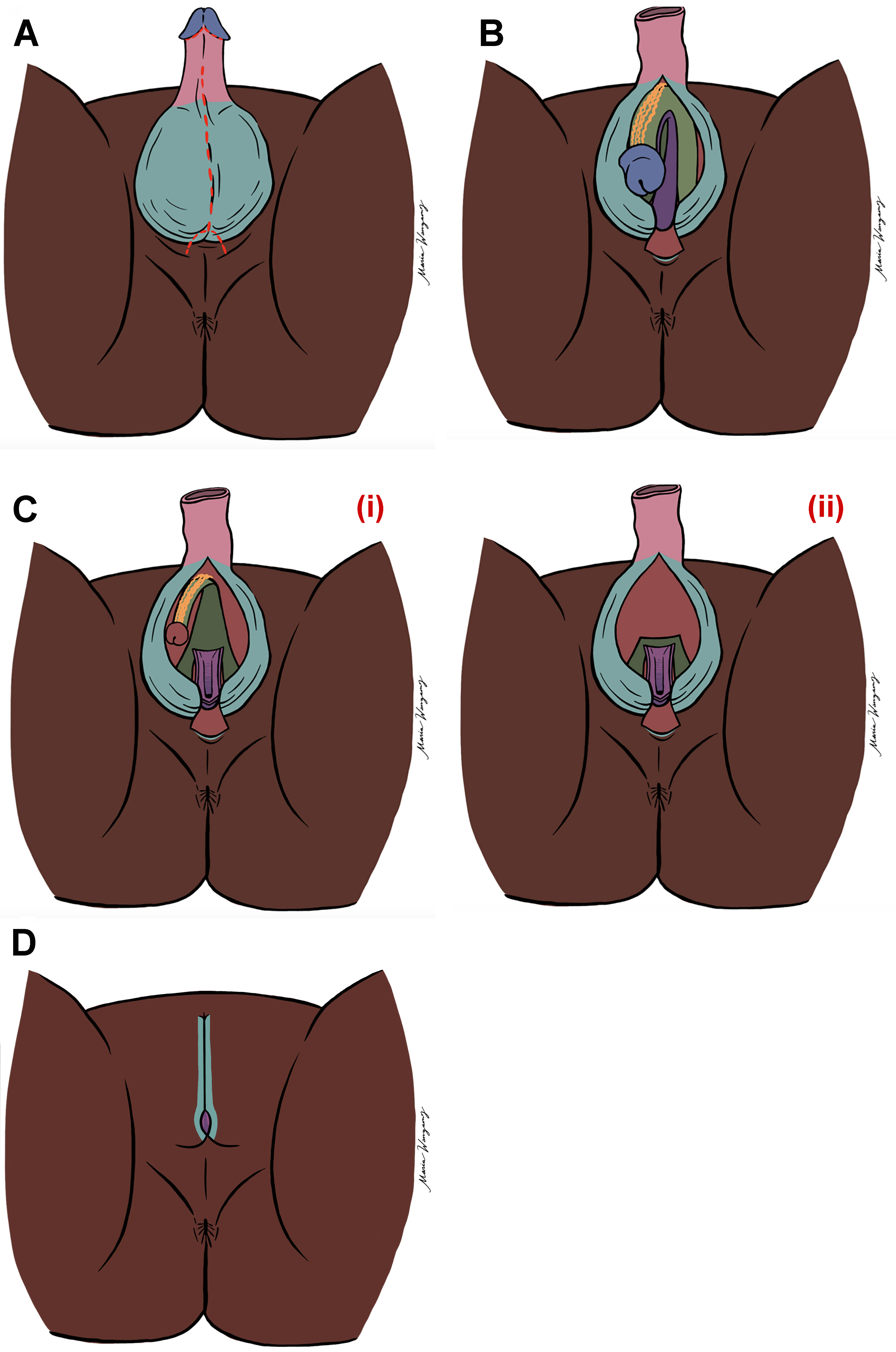
A diagram illustrating one method of nullification for patients assigned male at birth using a midline incision

Genital nullification procedures vary by patient anatomy, patient goals, and surgical methods. Nullification may be performed as a single procedure or over multiple stages.

In individuals assigned male at birth, genital nullification involves a combination of penectomy (removal of the penis), scrotectomy (removal of the scrotum), and orchiectomy (removal of the testicles). The urethra is shortened and a urethrostomy can be created to allow the patient to more easily urinate while sitting. Patients may opt to preserve or remove the nerves of the penis – if preserved, the glans may be de-epithelialised and placed beneath the skin or left exposed to attempt to maintain sexual sensation. The prostate is typically left intact during nullification procedures, as prostatectomy carries the risk of complications relating to urinary function. Patients with intact prostates may still be capable of the production and ejaculation of seminal fluid and of achieving prostate orgasms.

In individuals assigned female at birth, genital nullification involves a combination of vaginectomy (removal of the vagina), hysterectomy (removal of the uterus), salpingo-oophorectomy (removal of the ovaries and fallopian tubes), and removal of the labia and/or clitoris. Patients may opt to remove or preserve the clitoris – if preserved, the clitoris may be de-epithelialised and placed beneath the skin to attempt to maintain sexual sensation.

Genital nullification is an irreversible procedure that permanently impacts sexual, reproductive, and urinary function and carries a risk of complications including nerve damage, infection, chronic pain, and scarring. Patients who undergo nullification have limited options for future genital reconstruction surgeries and require life-long hormone replacement therapy. Due to the rarity of nullification procedures, limited patient outcome and complication data is available.

== Patient demographics ==
Transgender, gender non-conforming, and/or non-binary individuals may seek genital nullification as a form of gender affirming care, however, the procedure is not exclusive to these demographics. Patients may seek nullification in attempts to alleviate gender dysphoria in relation to the presence of genitalia, erogenous sensation, or erectile tissue function. Others may simply desire a more neutral external appearance. Individuals pursuing genital nullification for the purpose of gender affirmation may also pursue mastectomy or nipple removal procedures.

In the context of gender affirming care, genital nullification is sometimes referred to as a form of non-binary genital gender-affirming surgery; it is considered a non-standard surgical option compared to the binary vaginoplasty or phalloplasty procedures that are traditionally offerred to patients seeking genital gender-affirming surgery.

Some patients seeking genital nullification identify as eunuchs, a subculture of individuals assigned male at birth who wish to remove their genitals or make them non-functional, typically through castration or emasculation. This group should not be confused with individuals who solely fantasise about castration or emasculation or who may instead be experiencing a paraphilia, body integrity dysphoria, body dysmorphia, or a religious fervor. Eunuchs may or may not identify as transgender or gender diverse, with some identifying their gender simply as eunuch, and nullification procedures sought by this demographic may or may not be considered gender-affirming care. Not all eunuchs pursue full genital nullification, and not all individuals who have undergone castration or nullification identify as eunuchs.

Some individuals may pursue genital nullification as a form of body modification for aesthetic purposes and/or as part of a sexual practice such as BDSM. These individuals may self-identify using the term "nullo" and are considered rare within the extreme body modification community.

Being an uncommon procedure with little description in medical literature, few medical practitioners are willing or able to perform genital nullification. Some patients are hesitant to pursue the procedure or express their wishes to medical staff out of fear of discrimination or denial of care. Some individuals instead seek out unlicensed surgeons, known in the body modification community as "cutters", or attempt self-surgery.

== See also ==
- The Skoptsy, a Christian sect in the Russian Empire known for removing breasts and genitalia for religious reasons
