= Oscar Moreno =

Oscar Moreno may refer to:

- Oscar Moreno (politician) (born 1951), Filipino politician from Misamis Oriental
- Oscar Moreno (actor) (1921–2003), Filipino actor in several Philippine films of the 1940s
- Óscar Moreno (1878–1971), Portuguese urologist and chemist
- Óscar Cano (born 1972), Spanish football manager (full name is Óscar Pedro Cano Moreno)
- Oscar Moreno (rower) (fl. 1948), Argentine rower
- Oscar Moreno Nuñez, Gibraltarian footballer, current captain of F.C. Boca Gibraltar
