= Pablo Acosta Ortiz =

Venezuelan doctor, academic, surgeon, and politician (1864–1914)

Pablo Acosta Ortiz Revete
- Born: March 21, 1864; Barquisimeto, Lara, Venezuela
- Died: 1914 (aged 49–50); Venezuela
- Resting place: National Pantheon of Venezuela
- Education: Central University of Venezuela University of Paris
- Known for: vascular interventions, neck, surgical treatment of liver abscesses, Nicknamed "The scalpel wizard"
- Spouse: Maria Tresselt Caballero
- Children: Pablo Acosta-Ortiz Tresselt
- Awards: Bust in International College of Surgeons (ICS) Hall of Fame. Chicago United States Bronzes that eternalize his memory are found in a square in Barquisimeto, and Vargas Hospital in Caracas. The Palms of the Academy of the French Republic, Public Instruction Medal
- Scientific career
- Fields: Science, Surgery, Politics
- Workplaces: Vargas Hospital
- Thesis: 'The surgical treatment of aneurysms of the brachiocephalic trunk and of the aortic arch'
- Academic advisors: French surgeon Le Dentu

Pablo Acosta Ortiz Revete (1864–1914) was a Venezuelan medical doctor, academic, surgeon, politician and college professor known as the magician of the scalpel and considered the founder of modern surgery in Venezuela. He attended the 4th and 5th Pan American Sanitary Conferences as a representative of Venezuela.

== Early life and education ==
Ortiz was born in Barquisimeto on March 21, 1864 to Pablo Acosta Revete and Benigna Ortiz Aguero. At 2 months old, he moved to Caracas. He began to study medicine at the age of 16, and at 21 he earned the title of Doctor of Medicine and Surgery from the Central University of Venezuela. Later, he settled in Mérida where he practiced professionally for a few months. The following year he traveled to Paris to continue his medical studies. There he was a disciple of the famous French surgeon Le Dentu.

== Career ==
In 1892, he obtained the title of surgeon at the University of Paris and returned to Venezuela to practice as a doctor at the Vargas hospital in Caracas. He was also a professor of descriptive anatomy at the Central University. His students noted: “he handles the scalpel like a great artist”. Between 1893 and 1895, he was editor of the 'surgery' section of the Caracas Medical Gazette and co-founder (1893) and president (1894) of the Society of Physicians and Surgeons of Caracas. In 1895, he was appointed head of surgery at the Vargas hospital. From 1899 to 1907, he was the director of the Vargas hospital on 3 occasions, as well as being a member (1899) and vice president (1904) of the Administrative Board of the Civil Hospitals of the Federal District. He was also co-founder of the College of Physicians of Venezuela and president of its preparatory commission (1902). In 1904 and 1907, he was appointed professor of anatomy at the Central University of Venezuela (UCV). He was a founding member of the National Academy of Medicine (1904), president of the National Public Hygiene Commission, senator for the state of Lara (1910) and president of the National Academy of Medicine (1912-1914).

He was the author of two books: Du traitement chirurgical des anévrysmes du tronc brachio-céphalique et de la crosse de l'aorte (1892) and Lecciones de clínica quirúrgica (1911), as well as numerous articles on scientific and literary subjects.

Acosta Ortiz died in Paris of bronchopneumonia on February 13, 1914, aged 50.

=== Political career ===
In 1897, he was a deputy to the Congress of the Republic of Venezuela for the state of Bermúdez (now Anzoátegui, Sucre and Monagas) (1877) and Barcelona (1899). In 1904 he was vice-president of the administrative board of the civil hospitals of the Federal District, and in 1908, he was vice-rector of UCV. Between 1908 and 1909, he was a councillor for the Federal District and the following year he represented the state of Lara as a senator. His name is among the 35 founders of the National Academy of Medicine: he held the XXII chair since 1904 and presided over the body from 1912 to 1914.

Little is known about his parliamentary work, but according to Silva Falcón's yearbook, Acosta Ortiz was a deputy and senator in Congress, a representative of Venezuela at the International Conferences in Costa Rica and Chile, the International Congress of Mexico, and a member of the International Sanitary Committee of Washington. A controversial man, according to the yearbook, he defended his ideas in scientific magazines and newspapers of the time, and published numerous articles on scientific and literary topics.

== Legacy ==
- His work revolutionized the surgery of the time. As a pioneer in multiple surgical procedures, he was called 'the magician of the scalpel' by his contemporaries. He excelled in vascular interventions, especially those of the neck, and in the surgical treatment of liver abscesses. He published more than 20 works, among which his book Lectures on Surgical Clinic, published in 1911, stands out.
- He is recognized as one of the first to perform surgery in Venezuela
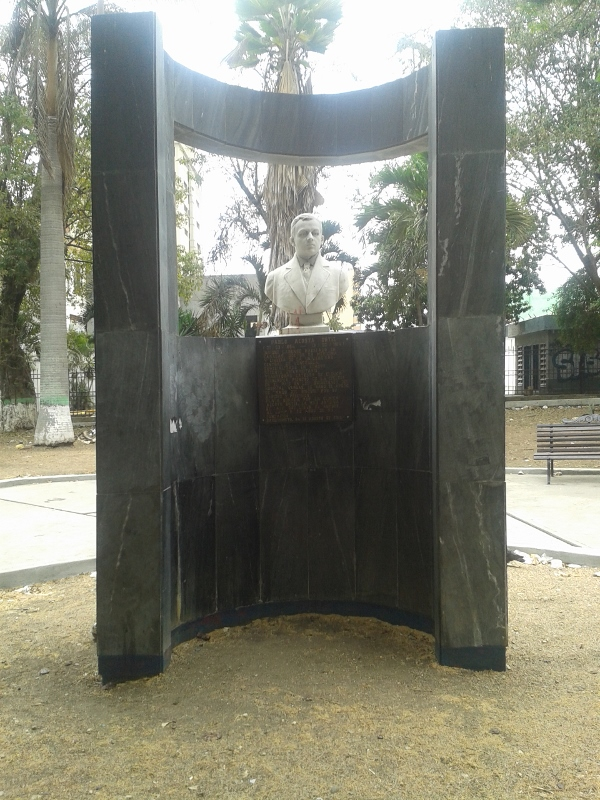
  Pedestal of Doctor Pablo Acosta Ortiz
- He taught in the Department of Anatomy at the UVC for two years. He founded the Chair of Clinical Surgery in 1895.
- He was co-founder and President of the Society of Physicians and Surgeons of Caracas.
- As head of surgery at the Vargas hospital from 1895, and with Dr. Santos Dominici, he established the Pasteur institute in Caracas. This was the first scientific research institute that included teaching, research and production of vaccines for the community. Here they produced the vaccines against Diphtheria, Rabies and Smallpox.
- He co-founded the College of Physicians of Venezuela and was a founding member of the Illustrious National Academy of Medicine in 1904.
- He chaired the Public Hygiene Commission of the Venezuelan State in 1909.

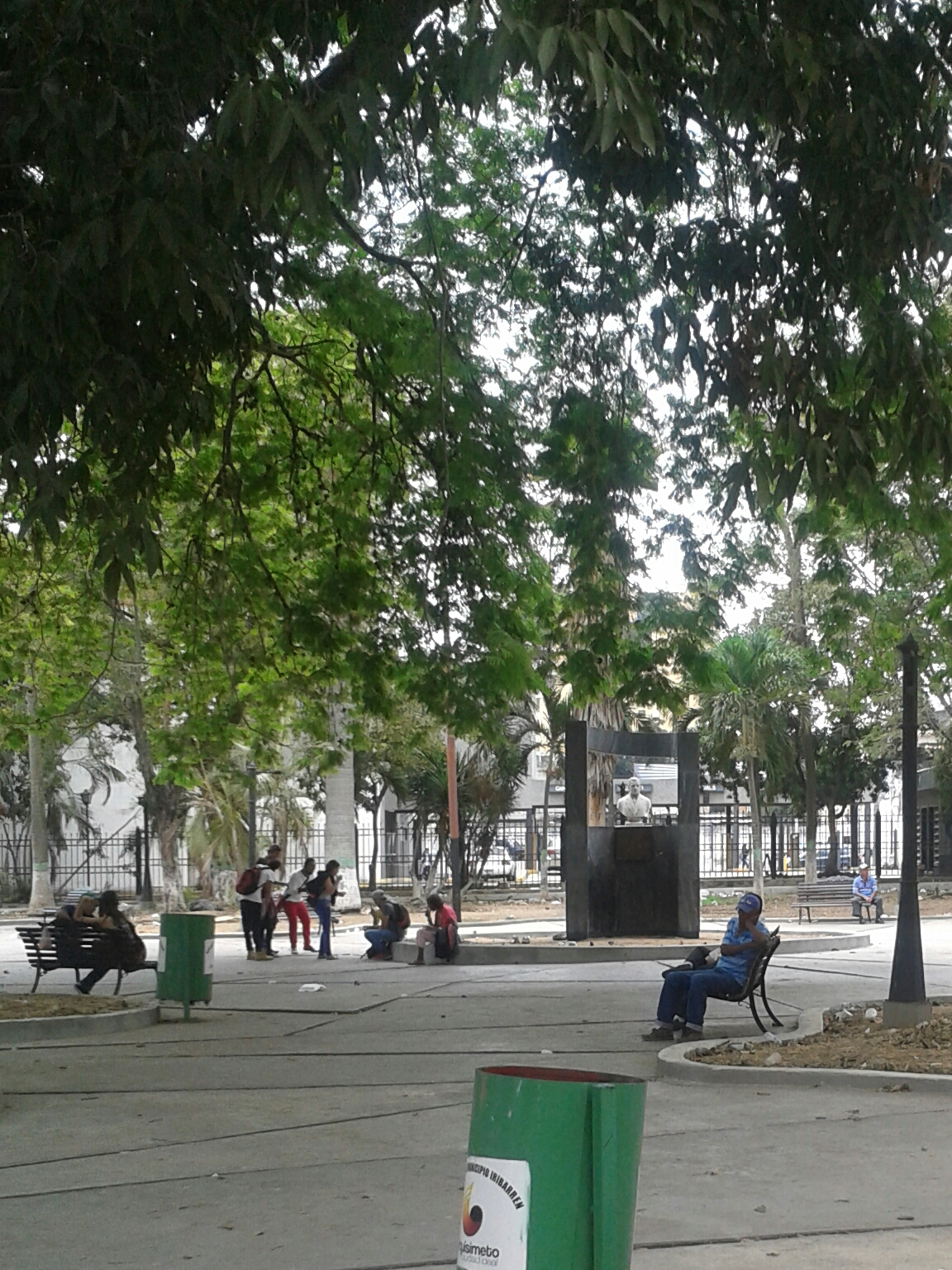
Pablo Acosta Ortiz Square front view

== Honors ==
- Several institutes are named in his honour including: a high school in Caracas (Pablo Acosta Ortiz High School), and the main hospital in San Fernando de Apure.
- Statues of Acosta Ortiz are found in a square in Barquisimeto, in the Vargas hospital in Caracas, and in the Hall of Fame of the International College of Surgeons in Chicago.
- Pablo Acosta Ortiz Square.
- Pablo Acosta Ortiz Street.
- Acosta Ortiz Clinic in Barquisimeto (Lara state).

== Sources ==
- Hispano-American medical biographical dictionary. National Academy of Medicine. Editorial Ateproca (2006).
- Interactive Lara Encyclopedia Available at: www.elimpulso.com
- www.anm.org.ve
- www.societyvenezolanadecirugia.org
- Direct bibliography: Acosta Ortiz, Pablo. Du treatment surgical des aneurismes du tronc brachio-cephalique et de la crosse de l'aorte. Paris: Henri Jouve, 1892; Surgical clinic lessons; with a foreword by Professor Le Dentu. Caracas: American Typography, 1935.
- Indirect bibliography: National Academy of Medicine, ed. Tribute to Dr. Pablo Acosta Ortiz: October 27, 1935. Caracas: National Academy of Medicine, 1935; Alviárez R., Rubén Darío. Profile of a surgeon.
- Barquisimeto: Central Western University, 1970; Carbonell, Diego. Apology of Acosta Ortiz. Caracas: American Typography, 1938; Silva Alvarez, Alberto. Pablo Acosta Ortiz: a magician with a scalpel. Caracas: Ministry of Health and Social Assistance, 1970; Venezuelan Society of Surgery, ed. Joint session to commemorate the centenary-birth of Professor D.
- Pablo Acosta Ortiz: College of Physicians of the Federal District, March 20, 1964. Caracas: Venezuelan Society of Surgery, 1964.
- Comunicación al Dr. Pablo Acosta Ortiz Presidente de la Comisión de Higiene Pública. INHRR [online]. 2006, vol.37, n.1, pp. 100–102. ISSN 0798-0477.
