= Rüdinger =

Rüdinger is a German surname. Notable people with the surname include:

- Alex Rüdinger (born 1991), American drummer
- Nikolaus Rüdinger (1832–1896), German anatomist

== See also ==
- Rüdiger
