= Pablo Acosta Ortiz Square =

Square in Barquisimeto, Venezuela

Coordinates: 10°04′01″N 69°18′41″W

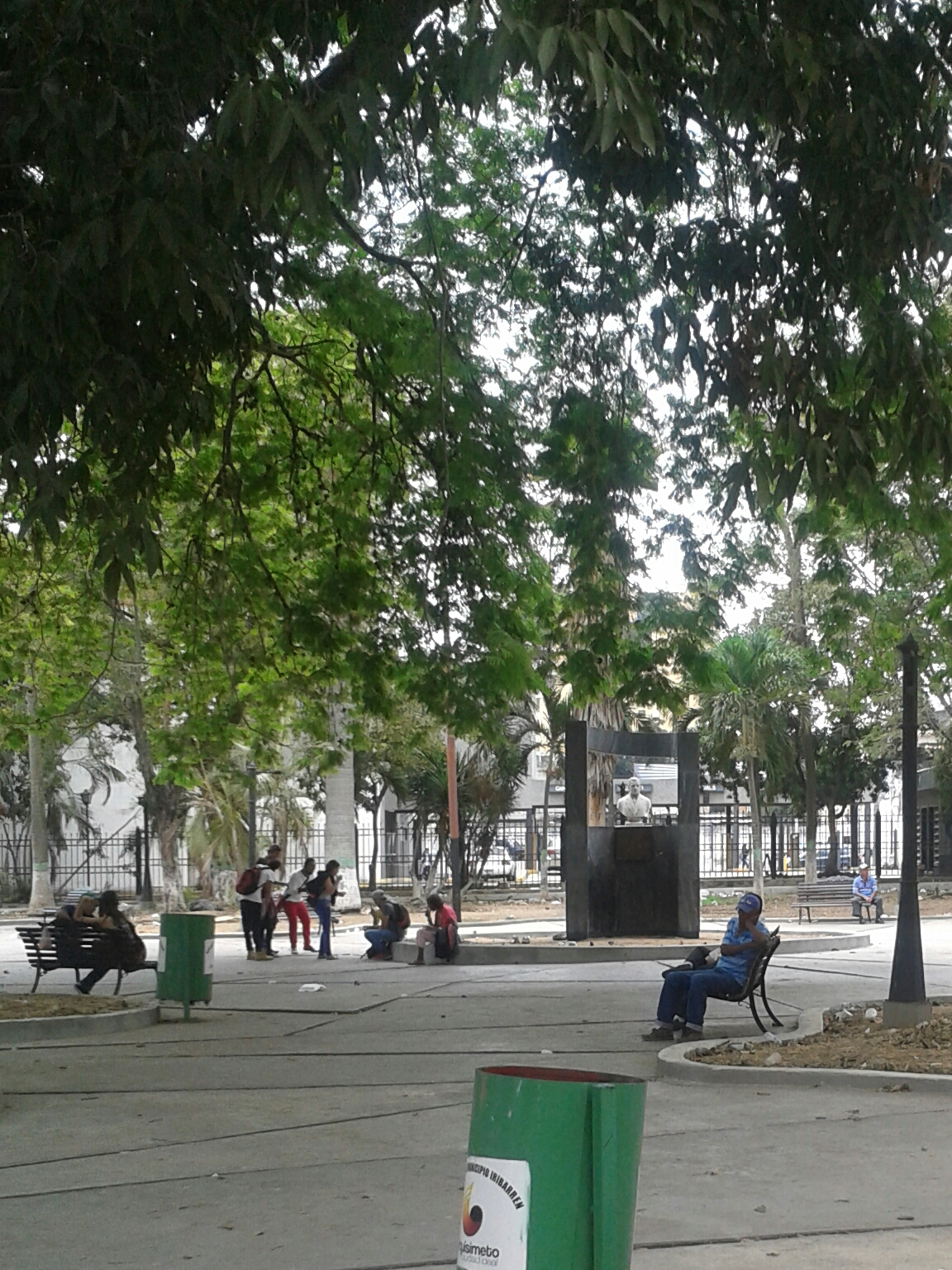
Pablo Acosta Ortiz Square Front View

The Pablo Acosta Ortiz square or Altagracia square is a public space located in the city of Barquisimeto in the center west of Venezuela, more specifically in the state of Lara. One of the best known and most emblematic space of the city. It bears the name and bust over a marble pedestal of the highest exponent of Venezuelan medicine the famous doctor, Pablo Acosta Ortiz. The square is located in front of the Altagracia church.

== Location ==
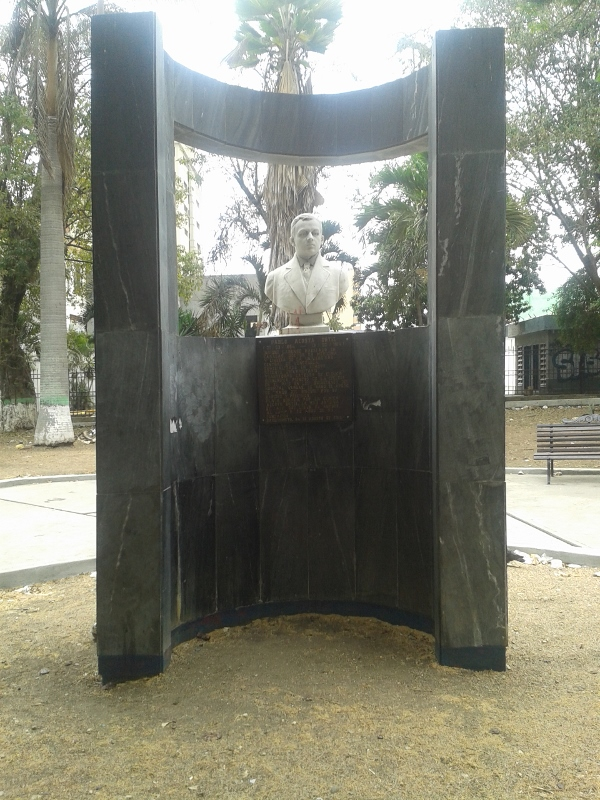
Bust of Pablo Acosta Ortiz located in the square

Located at Carrera 19 with Calle 20, on land in front of the old house where Dr. Pablo Acosta Ortiz was born, raised and studied until 1985 when he moved to Caracas to start his medical studies.

== History ==
It was built on April 4, 1936, and renamed Plaza Altagracia after the distinguished doctor. It is said that in its former location, General José Antonio Páez shot four slaves and several members of the Reform Revolution were executed there. In 1940 remodeling work began. They made concrete construction and a marble pedestal was erected on which a bust of Acosta Ortiz stands.

The place has been maintained until today, however, due to the unconsciousness of the citizens who pass through the area daily (since it is in a central area of the city) the place has deteriorated. Despite everything, the square is constantly visited by students from nearby schools and by walkers from its surroundings.
