= Bladder stone (animal) =

Common occurrence in animals

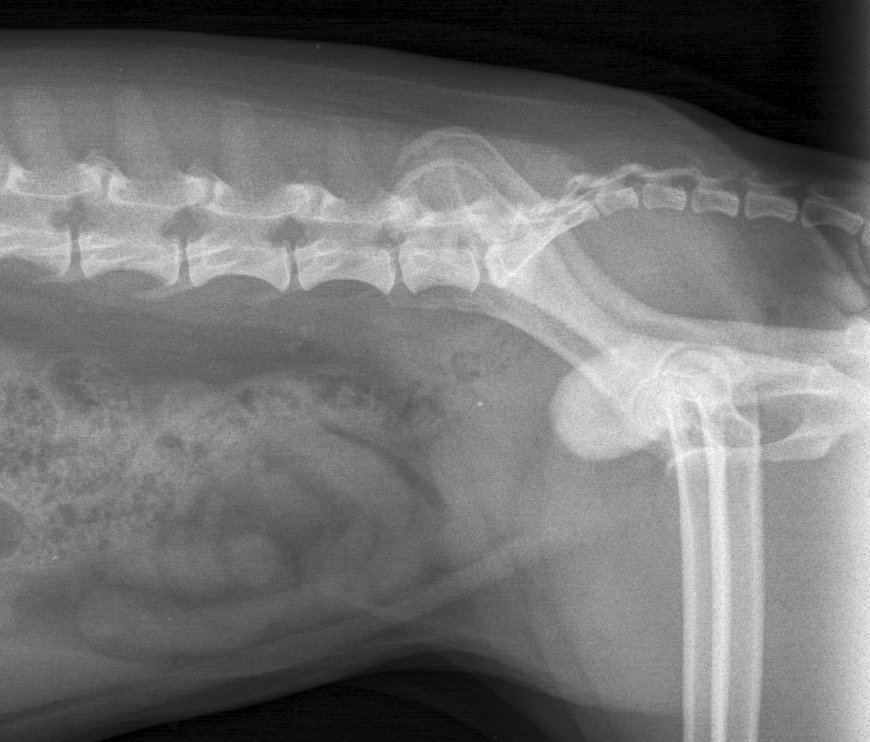
X-ray of a single, large bladder stone in a dog with a bladder located more to the rear than is usual

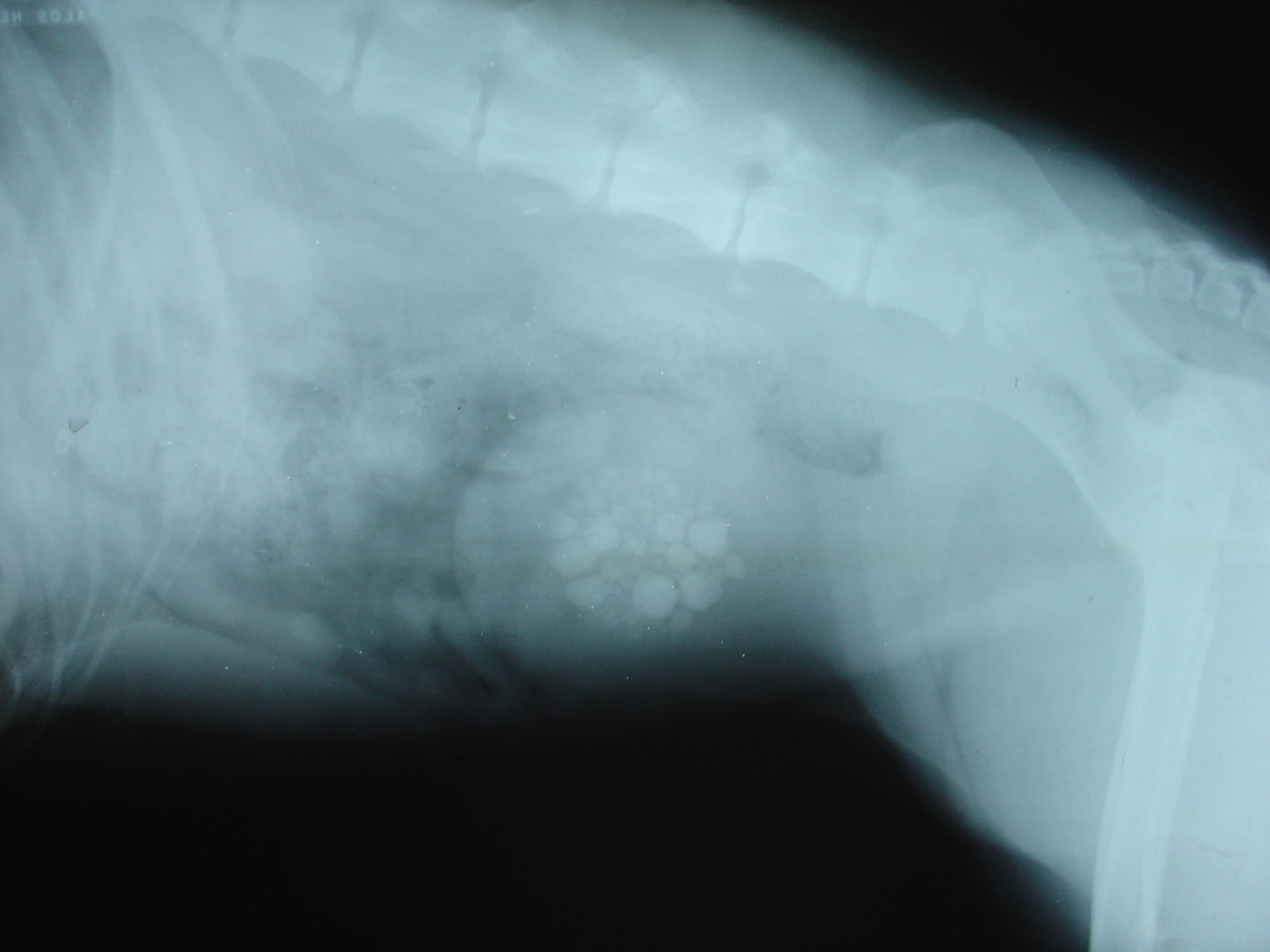
X-ray of bladder stones in a dog

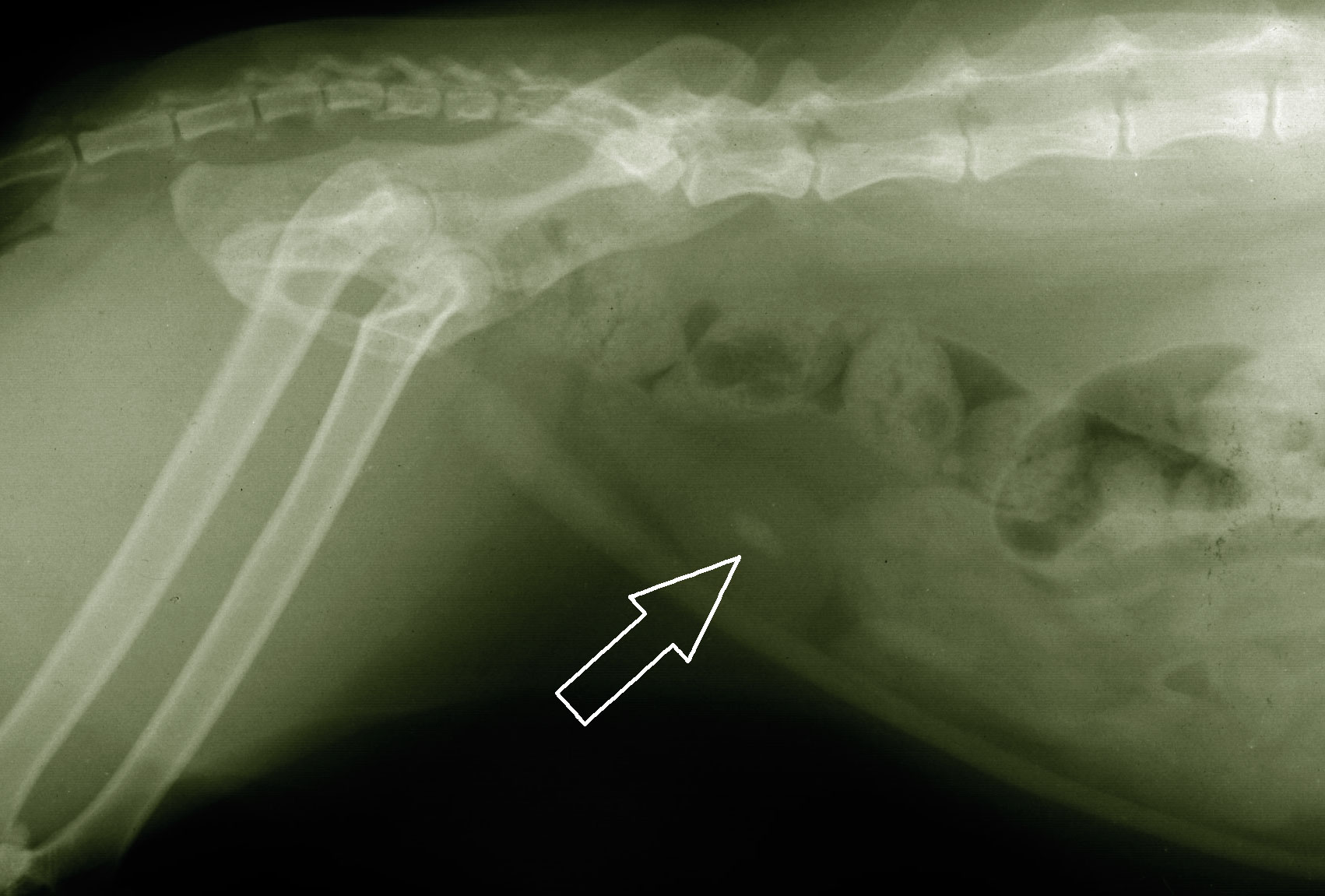
X-ray of a struvite bladder stone in a cat

Bladder stones or uroliths are a common occurrence in animals, especially in domestic animals such as dogs and cats. Occurrence in other species, including tortoises, has been reported as well. The stones form in the urinary bladder in varying size and numbers secondary to infection, dietary influences, and genetics. Stones can form in any part of the urinary tract in dogs and cats, but unlike in humans, stones of the kidney are less common and do not often cause significant disease, although they can contribute to pyelonephritis and chronic kidney disease. Types of stones include struvite, calcium oxalate, urate, cystine, calcium phosphate, and silicate. Struvite and calcium oxalate stones are by far the most common. Bladder stones are not the same as bladder crystals but if the crystals coalesce unchecked in the bladder they can become stones.

== Signs and symptoms ==
Bladder stones may cause blood in the urine (hematuria) but sometimes there may be no signs at all. Painful urination or straining to urinate are other signs. Urinary tract infections are commonly associated with bladder stones. Smaller stones may become lodged in the urethra, especially in male animals, causing urinary tract obstruction and the inability to urinate. This condition causes acute kidney failure, hyperkalemia, sepsis, and death within a few days.

== Mechanism ==
Oversaturation of urine with crystals is by far the biggest factor in stone formation in dogs and cats. This oversaturation can be caused by increased excretion of crystals by the kidneys, water reabsorption by the renal tubules resulting in concentration of the urine, and changes in urine pH that influence crystallization. Other contributing factors include diet, frequency of urination, genetics, current medications, and the presence of a urinary tract infection.

The stones form around a nidus, which can consist of white blood cells, bacteria, and organic matrix mixed with crystals, or crystals alone. The nidus makes up about two to ten percent of the mass of the stone. It is possible for the nidus to be made of a different type of crystal than the rest of the stone, also known as epitaxial growth.

Nutrition often plays a major role in the development of bladder stones. Sodium, calcium, phosphorus and potassium ratios and quantities play a large role in urinary health of animals. Research indicates that low dietary inclusion of potassium is associated with increased renal calcium excretion, which lowers urinary pH. By lowering urinary pH, the risk for development of calcium oxalate uroliths increases. Feeding proper amounts of calcium and potassium avoids this issue, which is especially common in male cats.

== Diagnosis ==
When symptoms indicate bladder stones, the first step is usually to take an x-ray. Most types of stones will appear readily in an x-ray, urate and occasionally cystine stones being the most common exceptions. Stones smaller than three millimeters may not be visible. Ultrasonography is also useful for identifying bladder stones. Crystals identified in a urinalysis may help identify the stones, but analysis of the stones is necessary for identification of the complete chemical composition.

=== Struvite stones ===
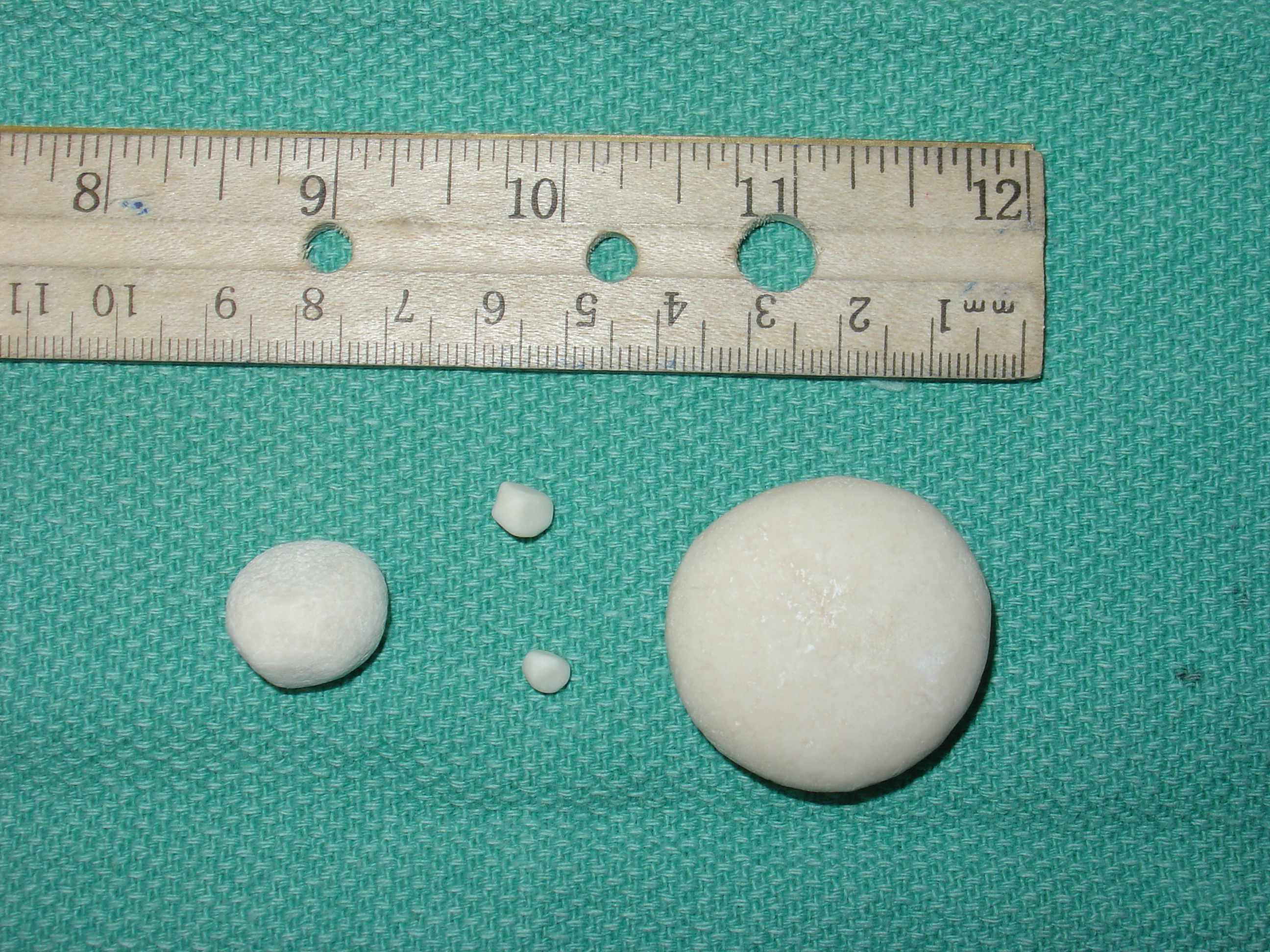
Struvite stones

Struvite stones are also known as magnesium ammonium phosphate stones due to their chemical composition - MgNH_{4}PO_{4}·6H_{2}O. Often there is a small amount of calcium phosphate present. They form at a neutral to alkaline pH of the urine. Bacterial infections contribute to their formation by increasing the pH of the urine through the urease enzyme in dogs. More than 90 percent of dogs with struvite stones have an associated urease-producing bacterial infection in the urinary tract, but in cats struvite stones usually form in sterile urine. The appearance of the stones vary from large solitary stones to multiple smaller stones. They can assume the shape of the bladder or urethra.

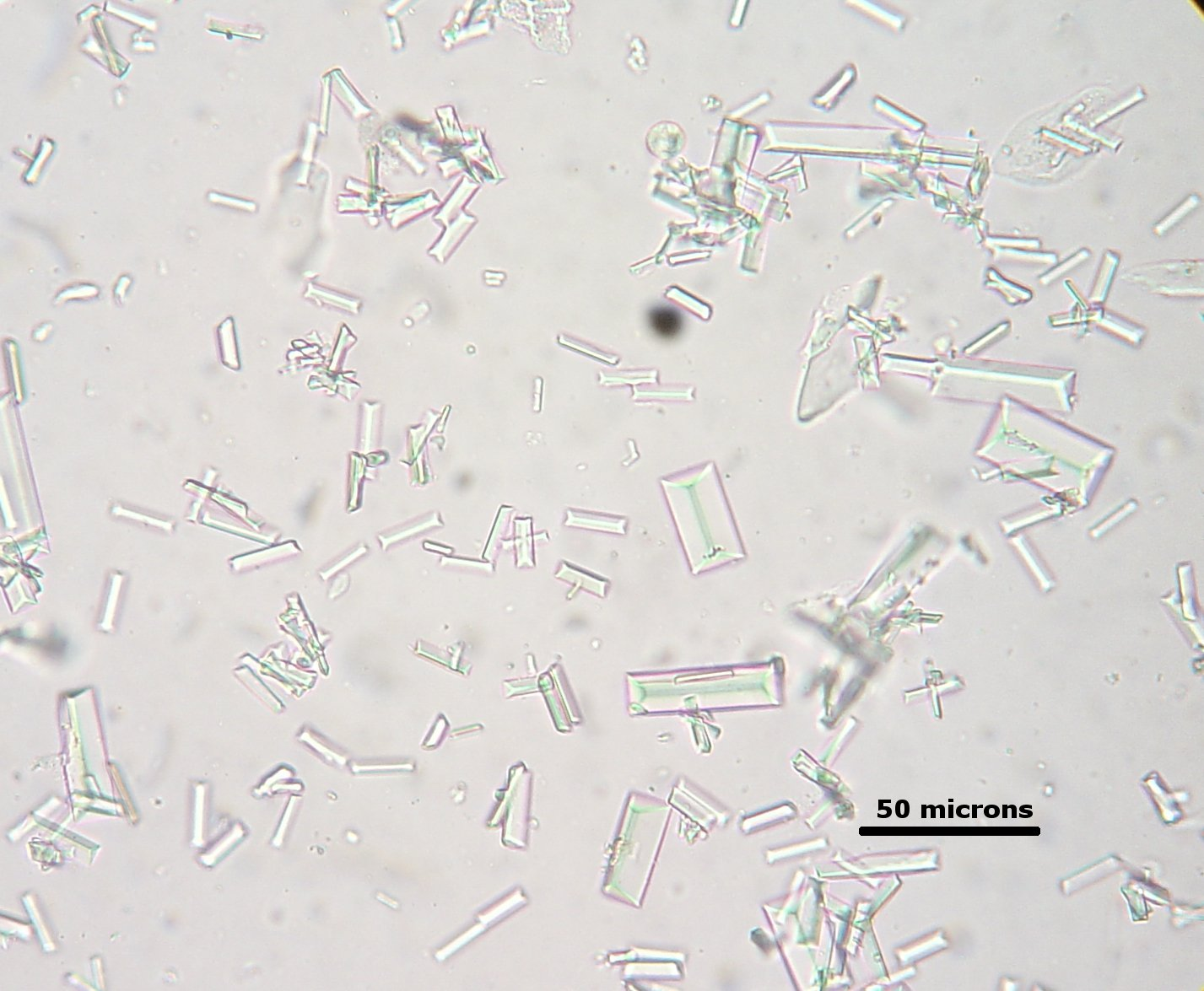
Struvite crystals

Dissolution of the struvite stones depends on acidification of the urine through diet or urinary acidifiers. Special diets for dissolution also have reduced protein, phosphorus, and magnesium, as well as increased salt to increase water consumption and dilute the urine. The diet needs to be fed exclusively, but it can only be fed for a few months total due to potential side effects. Contraindications to this diet include heart failure, liver failure, kidney failure, pancreatitis, hypertension (high blood pressure), and hypoalbuminemia (low serum albumin). Prevention of struvite stones is with a similar diet with milder restrictions.

Certain dog breeds are predisposed to struvite stones, including Miniature Schnauzers, Bichon Frises, and Cocker Spaniels. They are the most commonly reported bladder stone in female dogs and in ferrets (pregnant ferrets may be especially predisposed). For frequency in cats, see below.

=== Calcium oxalate stones ===
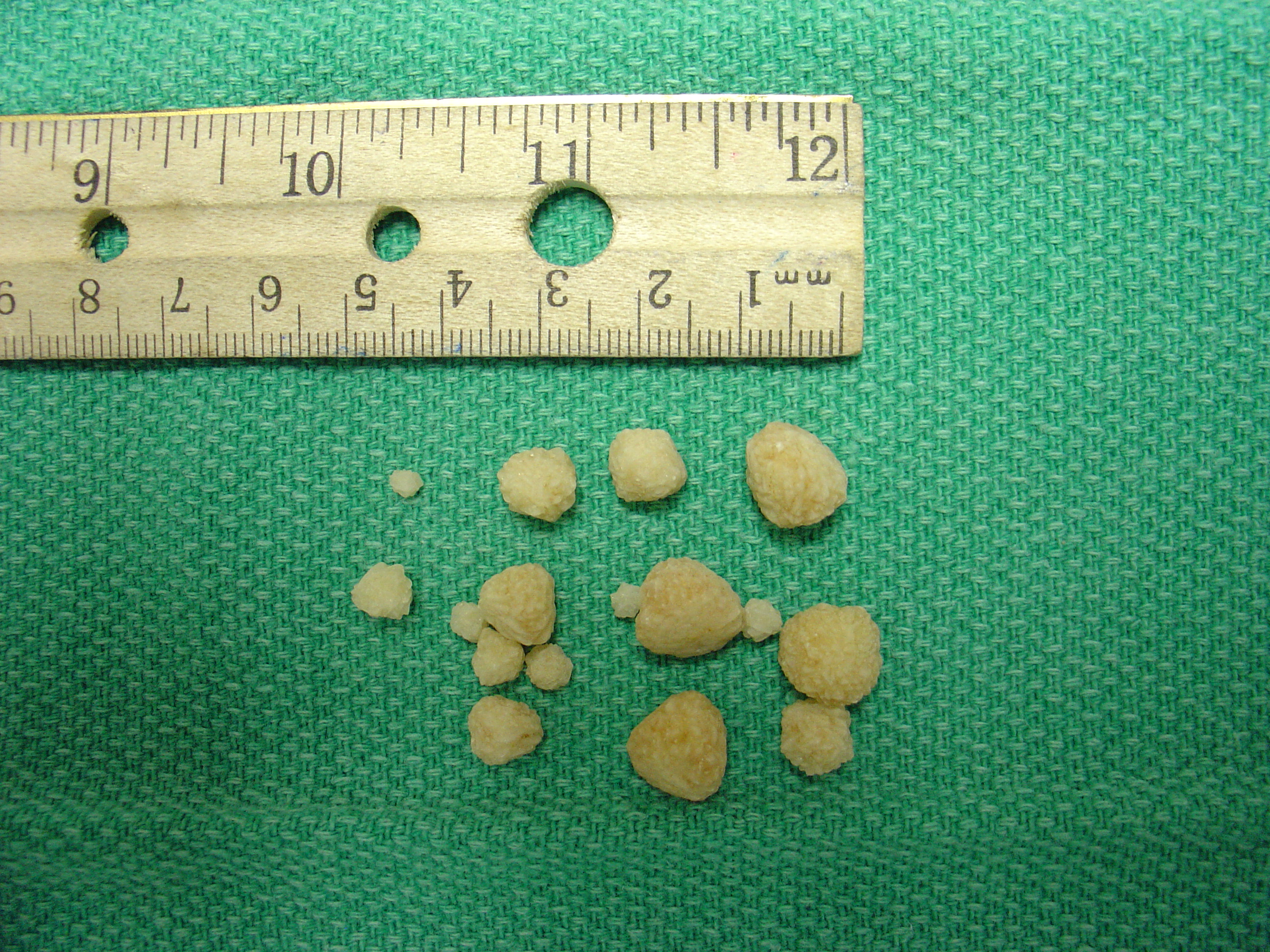
Calcium oxalate stones

Calcium oxalate stones form in an acidic to neutral urine. Two types naturally occur, calcium oxalate monohydrate, or whewellite (CaC_{2}O_{4}·H_{2}O), and calcium oxalate dihydrate, or weddellite (CaC_{2}O_{4}·2H_{2}O). Their appearance can be rough, smooth, spiculated (needle-like), or jackstone. Calcium oxalate stones form more readily in animals with hypercalcaemia, which can be caused by Addison's disease or certain types of cancer. Hypercalcaemia results in hypercalciuria, which can also be caused by Cushing's syndrome or hyperparathyroidism.

There is no recommended diet to dissolve calcium oxalate stones. For prevention a diet low in protein and oxalates and high in magnesium, phosphorus, and calcium is recommended. Increased dietary magnesium and phosphorus decreases the amount of calcium in the urine, and increased dietary calcium reduces absorption of oxalates from the intestines. Potassium citrate has been recommended to prevent calcium oxalate stone formation because it forms a soluble complex with oxalates and promotes the formation of alkaline urine.

Dog breeds possibly prone to calcium oxalate stones include Miniature Schnauzers, Lhasa Apsos, Yorkshire Terriers, Miniature Poodles, Shih Tzus, and Bichon Frises. They are the most common stone in male dogs. Calcium oxalate stones are also common in domestic rabbits. Rabbits are prone to hypercalciuria due to intestinal absorption of calcium not being dependent on vitamin D and a high fractional urinary excretion of calcium. The urine will appear thick and creamy or sometimes sandy. Small stones and sand can be removed using urohydropropulsion. Prevention is through reducing calcium intake by feeding more hay and less commercial rabbit pellets, and by not using mineral supplements.

=== Frequency of struvite and calcium oxalate stones in cats ===
The Minnesota Urolith Center at the University of Minnesota College of Veterinary Medicine has done detailed analysis of uroliths from animals since 1981 and has noted changing trends in feline uroliths. In 1981, struvite stones were the most common type in cats, making up 78 percent of submitted samples, with only 2 percent comprising calcium oxalate stones. In the mid-1980s there was a substantial increase in the number of calcium oxalate samples, and between 1994 and 2002, 55 percent of feline stones were calcium oxalate and 33 percent were struvite. This may have been caused by the use of dissolution diets for struvite stones in cats and modification of other diets to prevent struvite crystal formation. These modifications predisposed to calcium oxalate crystal formation. However, in 2004, struvite stones once again surpassed calcium oxalate stones 44.9 percent to 44.3 percent, and in 2006, 50 percent of stones were struvite and 39 percent were calcium oxalate. This may have been due to the increased use of diets designed to prevent calcium oxalate crystal formation, which because of increased magnesium in the diet and decreased acidity of the urine help promote struvite crystal formation.

Urethral plugs in cats are usually composed of struvite crystals and organic matter.

=== Urate stones ===
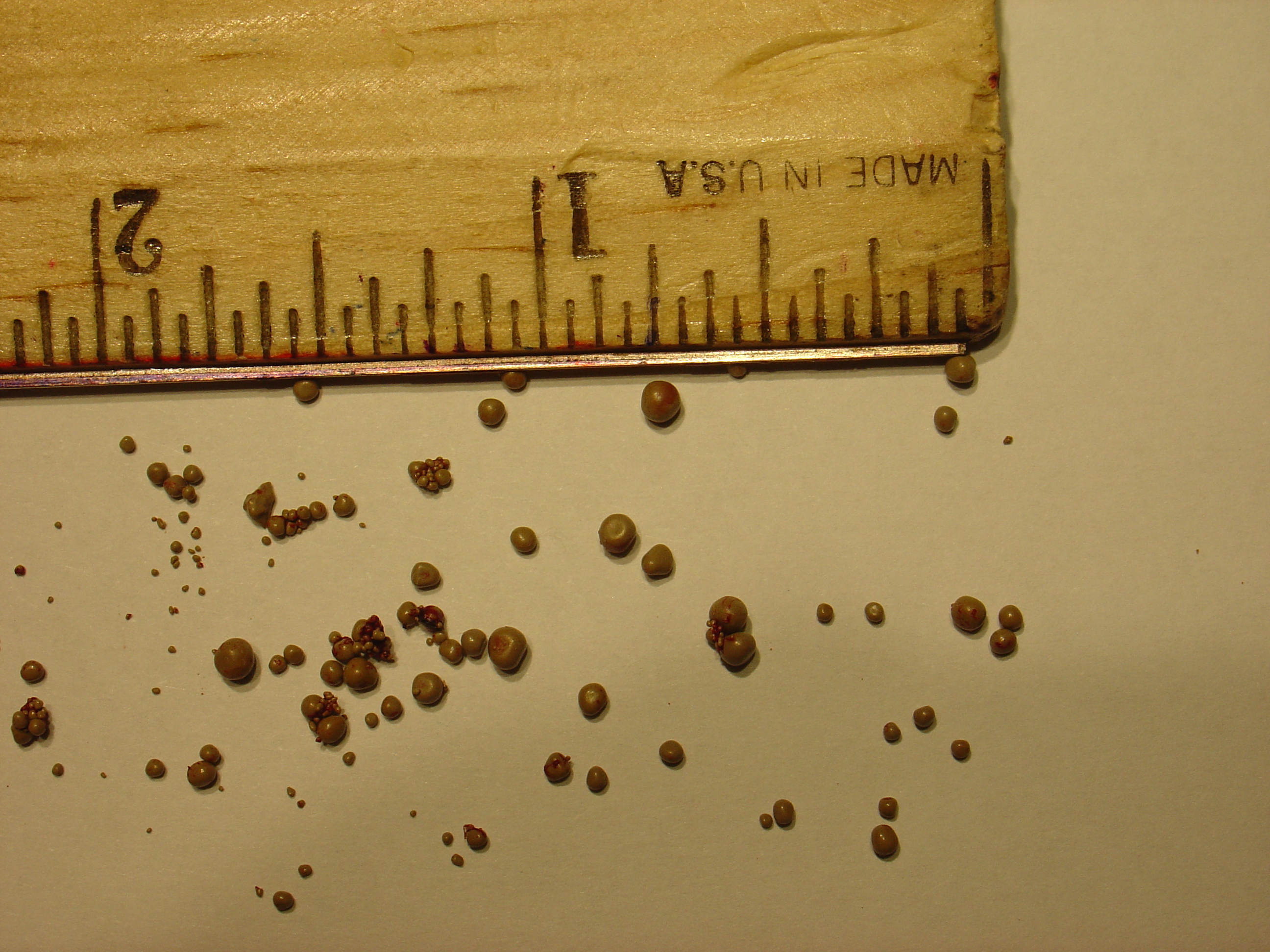
Urate stones

Urate (C_{5}H_{4}N_{4}O_{3}) stones, usually ammonium urate (NH_{4}·C_{5}H_{4}N_{4}O_{3}) or sodium urate monohydrate (Na·C_{5}H_{4}N_{4}O_{3}×H_{2}O), form in an acidic to neutral urine. They are usually small, yellow-brown, smooth stones. Urate stones form due to an increased excretion of uric acid in the urine. Dalmatians (especially males) and to a lesser extent Bulldogs are genetically predisposed to the formation of urate stones because of an altered metabolism of purines. Dalmatians have a decreased rate of urate hepatic transport, leading to only about 30 to 40 percent conversion of urate to allantoin, compared with greater than 90 percent conversion in other breeds. Dogs with portosystemic shunts or endstage liver disease also have increased uric acid excretion in the urine due to reduced conversion of uric acid to allantoin and ammonia to urea. Urate stones make up about six percent of all stones in the cat.

Urate stones can be dissolved using a diet with reduced purines that alkalinizes and dilutes the urine. Allopurinol is used in dogs with altered purine metabolism to prevent the formation of uric acid. Feeding a diet high in purines while simultaneously administering allopurinol can result in the formation of xanthine (C_{5}H_{4}N_{4}O_{2}) stones.

=== Cystine stones ===
Cystine ((SCH_{2}CHNH_{2}COOH)_{2}) stones form in an acidic to neutral urine. They are usually smooth and round. They are caused by increased urine excretion of cystine (a relatively insoluble amino acid) in dogs with a defect in renal tubule reabsorption of cystine. Dietary reduction of protein and alkalinization of the urine may help prevent formation. Medications such as D-penicillamine and 2-MPG contain thiol, which forms a soluble complex with cystine in the urine. Dog breeds possibly predisposed to formation of cystine stones include Bulldogs, Dachshunds, Basset Hounds, Chihuahuas, Yorkshire Terriers, Irish Terriers, and Newfoundlands. In Newfoundlands, cystinuria is inherited as an autosomal recessive trait, but in the other breeds it is a sex linked trait and found primarily in male dogs.

=== Calcium phosphate stones ===
Calcium phosphate, also known as hydroxyapatite (Ca_{10}(PO_{4})_{6}(OH)_{2}), stones form in neutral to alkaline urine. They are usually smooth and round. Calcium phosphate is usually a component of struvite or calcium oxalate stones and is infrequently a pure stone. They form more readily with hypercalcaemia. Dog breeds possibly predisposed to calcium phosphate stone formation include Yorkshire Terriers, Miniature Schnauzers, and Cocker Spaniels.

=== Silicate stones ===
Silicate (SiO_{2}) stones form in acidic to neutral urine. They are usually jackstone in appearance. There is possibly an increased incidence associated with dogs on diets that have a large amount of corn gluten or soybean hulls. Dog breeds possibly predisposed include German Shepherd Dogs, Golden Retrievers, Labrador Retrievers, and Miniature Schnauzers. Early reports described a predominance of silica stones in German Shepherds, although many breeds have since been implicated. The stones are usually multiple, occur at a mean age of about six years, and develop in the bladder and urethra; in male dogs, urethral obstruction is the most common presenting problem. Silica uroliths are radiopaque, and identification requires spectrographic analysis rather than qualitative stone-analysis kits. Prevention is limited to general management: added water and salt to induce diuresis and lower urine solute concentration, elimination of urinary tract infections when present, and avoiding diets high in plant proteins.

== Treatment ==
Reasons for treatment of bladder stones include recurring symptoms and risk of urinary tract obstruction. Some stones, including struvite and urate stones, can be dissolved using dietary modifications and/or medications. Calcium oxalate stones are insoluble and must be surgically removed. Small stones in female dogs may possibly be removed by urohydropropulsion, a nonsurgical procedure. Urohydropropulsion is performed under sedation by filling the bladder with saline through a catheter, holding the dog vertically, and squeezing the bladder to expel the stones through the urethra. Bladder stones can be removed surgically by a cystotomy, which is a small incision into the bladder to scoop out the stones. Stones lodged in the urethra can often be flushed into the bladder and removed, but sometimes a urethrotomy is necessary. In male dogs with recurrent urinary tract obstruction a scrotal urethrostomy creates a permanent opening in the urethra proximal to the area where most stones lodge, behind the os penis. In male cats, stones lodge where the urethra narrows in the penis. Recurrent cases can be treated surgically with a perineal urethrostomy, which removes the penis and creates a new opening for the urethra.

To prevent recurrence of stones, special diets can be used for each type of stone. Increasing water consumption by the animal dilutes the urine, which prevents oversaturation of the urine with crystals.
