= Pierre Delbet =

French surgeon (1861–1957)

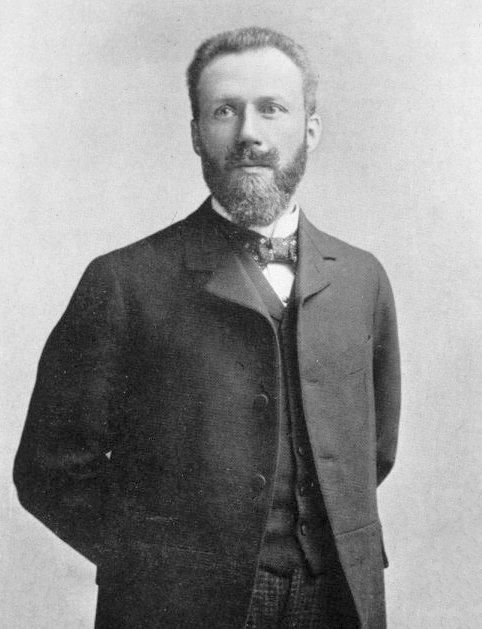
- Born: 15 November 1861; La Ferté-Gaucher, France
- Died: 17 July 1957 (aged 95)

Pierre Delbet (15 November 1861 – 17 July 1957) was a French surgeon born in La Ferté-Gaucher.

== Biography ==
In 1889 he received his medical doctorate, and in 1909 became a professor of clinical surgery in Paris. In 1921 he became a member of the Académie de Médecine.

Delbet is remembered for his advocacy of magnesium chloride. During World War I, Delbet was searching for a solution that could cleanse wounds but not damage tissue as traditional antiseptics did. In 1915 he found that magnesium chloride not only worked as an antiseptic but was also harmless to body tissue. Serendipitously, he discovered that when the magnesium chloride solution was taken orally or intravenously, it appeared to be a remedy for other ailments. Delbet also believed that magnesium was beneficial to the efficiency of white blood cells, of which he described in his treatise "Politique Préventive du Cancer".

Delbet argued that cancer was provoked by the lack of magnesium in the diet. He was influenced by the research of Robert Dupont who undertook a retrospective study in French Africa. Dupont's research concluded that the Sara people's diet based on millet was rich in magnesium chloride which explained the lack of cancer among them.

With Jean-François-Auguste Le Dentu (1841-1926) and others, he was co-publisher of the multi-volume Traité de chirurgie clinique et opératoire (1901 et seq.).

== Selected writings ==
- Clinique chirurgicale, with Ulysse Trélat; 2 volumes, Paris, 1891.
- Précis d’anatomie topographique, with Nikolaus Rüdinger; Paris, 1893.
- Asepsie opératoire, with L Bigeard. Paris, 1901. - Aseptic surgery
- Chirurgie artérielle et veineuse, Paris, 1906. - Arterial and venous surgery.
- Névralgies du trijumeau, with Maurice Chevassu; Paris, 1911. - Trigeminal neuralgia.
- Méthode du traitement des fractures, Paris, 1916.
- Politique Préventive du Cancer, Paris, 1944.
