= Georges Marion =

French surgeon & urologist (1869–1960)

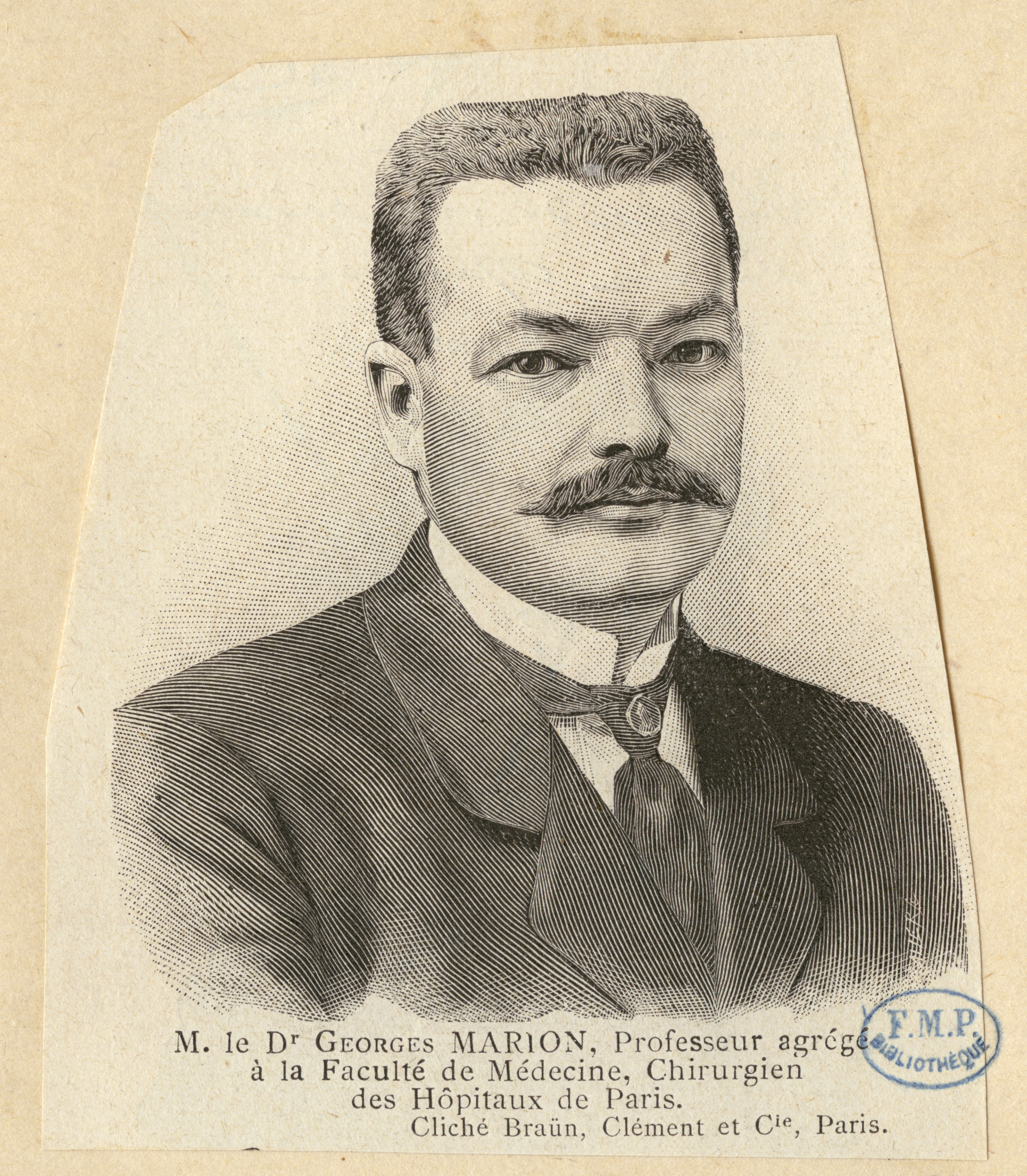
Georges Marion

Georges Marion (1 June 1869, in Fixin, Côte-d'Or – 17 October 1960, in Paris) was a French surgeon and urologist.

In 1892 he became an interne of hospitals in Paris, followed by promotions as aide of anatomy (1894) and prosector (1896). In 1897 he obtained his medical doctorate, and became chief of clinical surgery at the Hôtel-Dieu during the following year. In 1900 he was appointed chirurgien des hôpitaux, and shortly afterwards attained an associate professorship at the medical faculty in Paris.

His name is associated with "Marion's disease", described as a congenital obstruction of the posterior urethra. He made contributions involving suprapubic prostatectomy, and is credited for making modifications to Joaquín Albarrán's procedure of nephropexy ("nephropexy ad modum Albarran Marion").

== Written works ==
- Manuel de technique chirurgicale des opérations courantes, 1903 - Manual of surgical techniques in current operations.
- Chirurgie du système nerveux : crâne et encéphale; rachis et moëlle; nerfs, 1905 - Surgery of the nervous system: brain and skull; spine and marrow; nerves.
- Manuel de technique chirurgicale, 1908 - Manual of surgical techniques.
- Réparation de l'urèthre par suture bout à bout avec dérivation immédiate et temporaire des urines par uréthrostomie, 1910 - Repair of the urethra, end-to-end suturing, with immediate and temporary diversion of urine by urethrostomy; (with Maurice Heitz-Boyer 1876-1950).
- Leçons de chirurgie urinaire, 1912 - Lessons on urinary surgery.
- Traité pratique de cystoscopie et de cathétérisme urétéral, 1914 - Practical treatise on cystoscopy and urethral catheterization; (second edition completely revised, published in 1924 with Maurice Heitz-Boyer).
- Traité d'urologie, 1921 - Treatise of urology.
