= Maurice Chevassu =

French surgeon & urologist (1877–1957)

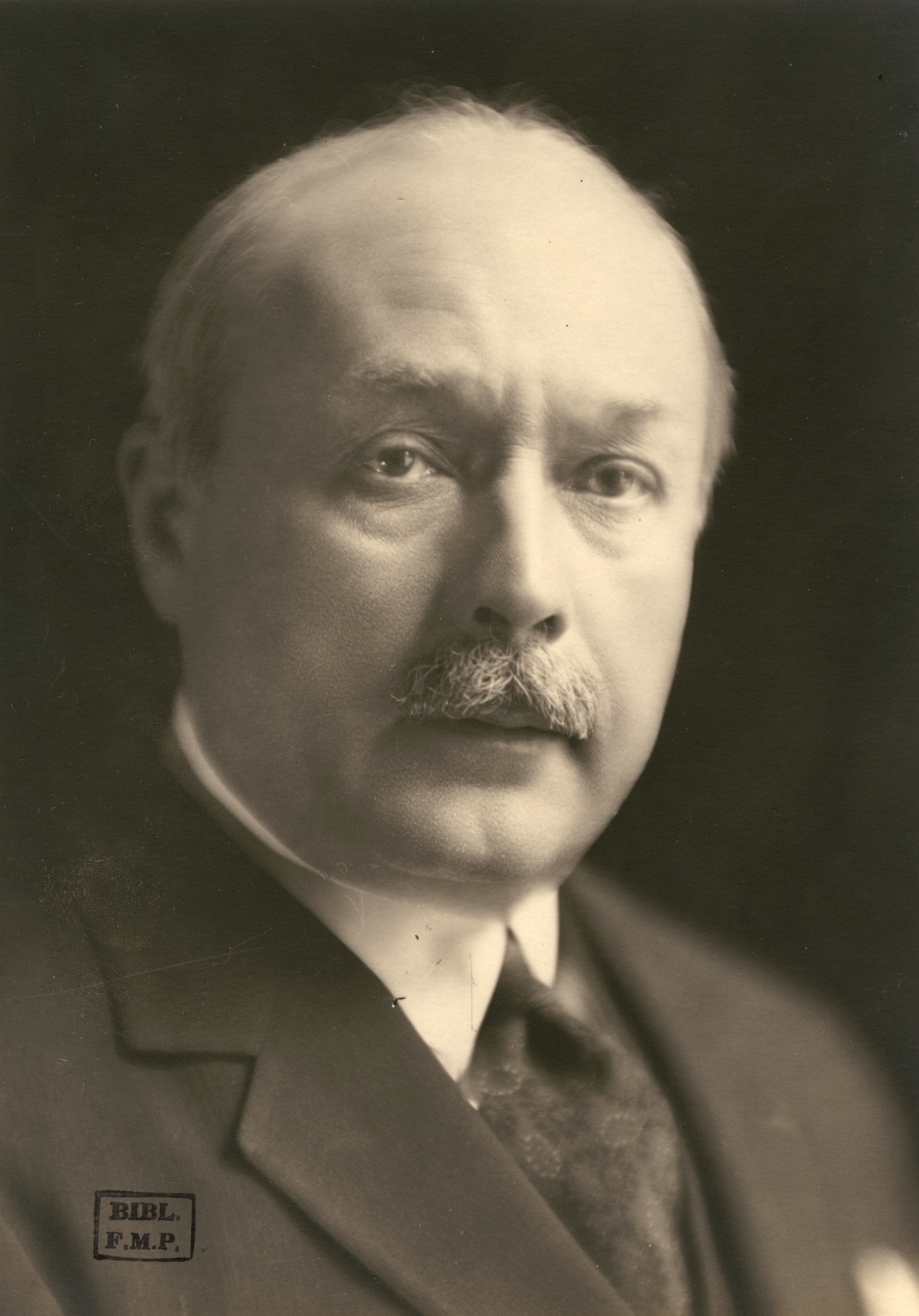
Maurice Chevassu

Maurice-Auguste Chevassu (28 October 1877, in Lons-le-Saunier – 11 July 1957) was a French surgeon and urologist known for his work with testicular cancer.

In 1906 he received his doctorate, obtaining his agrégation in general surgery in 1910. From 1919 to 1933 he served as director of the surgical clinic at Hôpital Cochin in Paris. In 1933 he was appointed professor of surgical pathology, followed by an assignment as chair of clinical urology at Hôpital Necker. At Necker he succeeded Georges Marion (1869-1960).

In 1928 he became a member of the Académie nationale de médecine, being chosen its vice-president in 1955. In 1951–52 he was president of the Société française d'histoire de la médecine (French Society of Medical History).

In 1906 he published Tumeurs du testicule (tumors of the testis), a book in which he provides a thorough categorization of testicular cancers. Here he explains two dominant types of testicular neoplasms. In regards to surgery for testicular cancer, he doubted the efficacy of simple orchiectomy, instead advocating removal of the testis with its vascular stem, followed by complete removal of associated lymph nodes.

A specialized ureteric catheter known as a "Chevassu catheter" is named after him.

== Publications ==
- Tumeurs du testicule, Paris : G. Steinheil, 1906 - Tumors of the testis.
- Traitement de la tuberculose urinaire (tuberculine et néphrectomie), with Felix Legueu (1863-1939), Paris : imp. de la Cour d'appel, Maretheux dir., 1912 - Treatment of urinary tuberculosis (tuberculin and nephrectomy).
- Le Dosage de l'urée sanguine et la constante uréique chez les urinaires chirurgicaux, Paris : Masson, 1912.
- L'Exploration anatomique des lésions chirurgicales du rein au moyen de l'urétéro-pyélographie rétrograde, Paris : Masson, 1932 - Anatomical exploration of surgical lesions of the kidney via ureteral retrograde pyelography.
- Cours de Clinique urologique Guyon. Leçon inaugurale, Paris : J.-B. Baillière et fils, 1939 - Course at the Clinique urologique Guyon, Inaugural lesson.
- Comparaison du fonctionnement rénal avant et après la néphrectomie, Paris : Revue de Gynécologie, 1911, en collaboration avec Moreno.
- Tumeurs Du Testicule (1906). Doctoral thesis.
