= Perthes test =

Clinical test for assessing the patency of the deep femoral vein prior to surgery

- Purpose: assess patency of the deep femoral vein

The Perthes test is a clinical test for assessing the patency of the deep femoral vein prior to varicose vein surgery. It is named after German surgeon Georg Perthes.

The limb is elevated and an elastic bandage is applied firmly from the toes to the upper 1/3 of the thigh to obliterate the superficial veins only. With the bandage applied the patient is asked to walk for 5 minutes. If deep system is competent, the blood will go through and back to the heart. If the deep system is Blocked(has a thrombus), the patient will feel pain in the leg.

This test is sometimes referred to as the Delbet-Mocquot test, named after French physicians Pierre Delbet and Pierre Mocquot.

== Modified Perthes test ==
The test is done by applying a tourniquet at the level of the sapheno-femoral junction to occlude the superficial pathway, and then the patient is asked to move in situ. If the deep veins are occluded, the dilated veins increase in prominence.This is essential before performing a surgery for varicose veins i.e. The Trendelenberg procedure so as to ascertain the patency of deep venous system before removing or ligating the superficial system

This is a more objective test as it does not depend on patient's pain threshold.
