= Georg Perthes =

German surgeon (1869–1927)

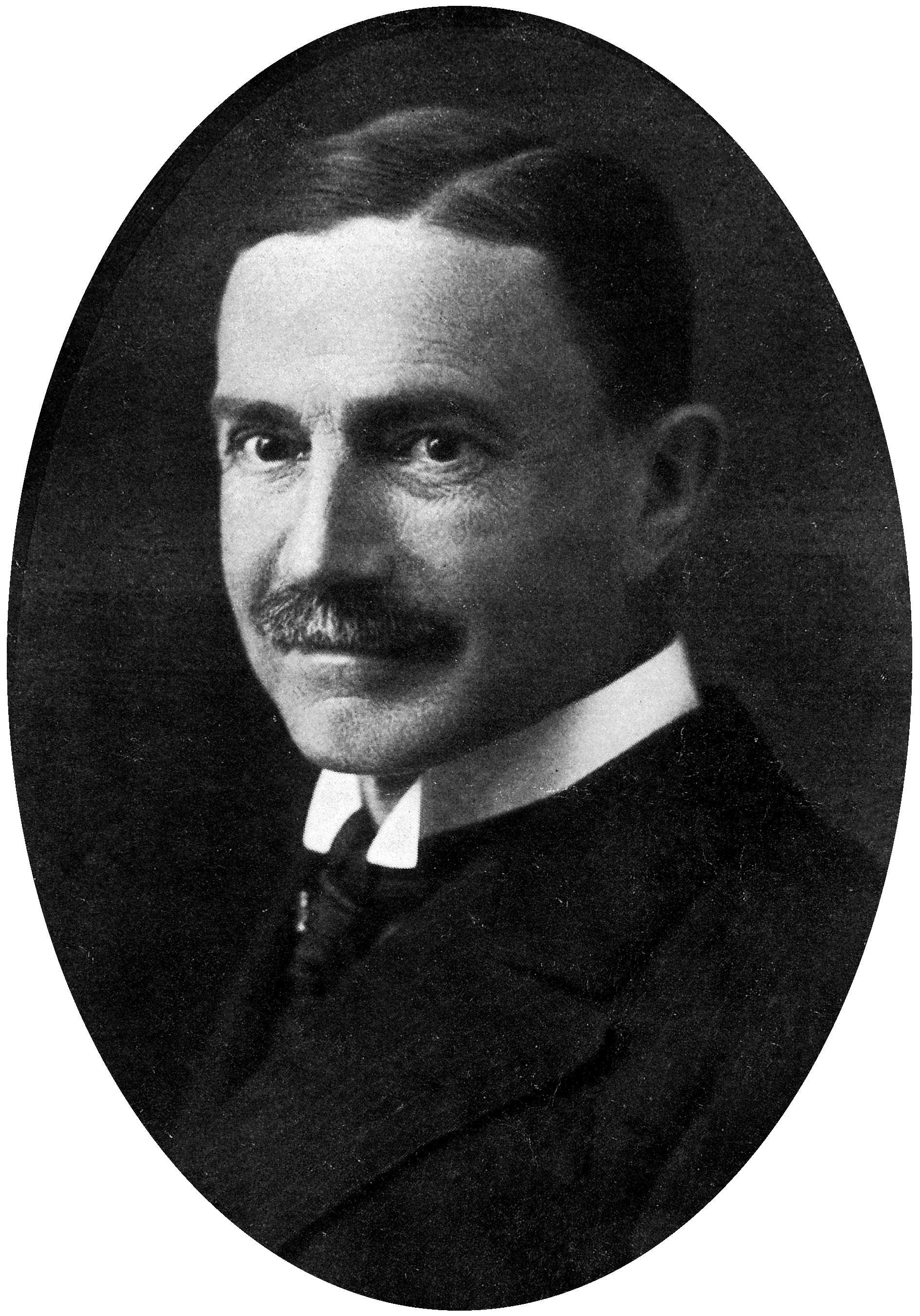
Georg Perthes

Georg Clemens Perthes (17 January 1869 – 3 January 1927) was a German surgeon and X-ray diagnostic pioneer.

== Biography ==
Perthes was born in Moers, Kingdom of Prussia. In 1891 he received his medical doctorate from the University of Bonn, and later was a surgeon in Bonn and Leipzig where he worked with Friedrich Trendelenburg (1844–1924). In 1910 he succeeded Paul von Bruns (1846–1916) as head of the surgical clinic at Tübingen. In 1900–01 he was a military surgeon at the German colonial seaport of Qingdao, China.

Perthes' primary area of research involved radiological treatment and therapy. He pioneered the use of radiology for the treatment of warts, skin cancer and breast carcinomas. Today he is best known for a child illness named Perthes' disease, also known as Legg–Calvé–Perthes syndrome, a disease causing avascular necrosis of the hip joint. Perthes took the first X-rays of a patient with this syndrome in 1898; however, his findings weren't published until several years later. While in Qingdao, he had the opportunity to perform radiological studies on the feet of Chinese women that had been subjected to the traditional practice of being crushed and bound.

As a surgeon Perthes made several contributions, including a procedure of suction drainage for empyema, and the use of a pneumatic cuff for hemostasis during limb surgeries. Also, a test for evaluating the competence of deep femoral veins prior to varicose vein surgery is called the "Perthes test" (this test is sometimes referred to as the "Delbet–Mocquot test", named after French physicians Pierre Delbet and Pierre Mocquot. Perthes died of a stroke in 1927 in Arosa, Switzerland.

== Publications ==
- Über den Einfluss der Röntgenstrahlen auf epitheliale Gewebe, insbesondere auf das Carcinom. in von Langenbeck's Archiv für klinische Chirurgie, Berlin, 1903, 71: 955–1000 (On the influence of X-rays involving epithelial tissues, in particular cancer).
- Über Operationen bei habitueller Schulterluxation. Deutsche Zeitschrift für Chirurgie, Leipzig, 1906, 85: 199–227 (On surgery for habitual shoulder dislocation).
- Verletzungen und Krankheiten der Kiefer. Deutsche Chirurgie 33a, Stuttgart, 1907; second edition by Eduard Kurt Borchers, 1932 (Injuries and diseases of the jaw).
- Über Arthritis deformans juvenilis. Deutsche Zeitschrift für Chirurgie, Leipzig, 1910, 107: 111–159 (On rheumatoid arthritis in adolescents).
- Chirurgia externa. In: Handbuch der gesamten Therapie. 4th edition, Volume 6, Jena 1911
- Die Chirurgie der Zähne, des Zahnfleisches und der Kiefer. In: Handbuch der praktischen Chirurgie, 4th edition, Volume 1, Stuttgart, 1913, Sixth Edition- 1926 (with Oskar Römer); (Surgery of the teeth, gums and jaw).
- Über den Tod. Tübingen 1920; second edition, Stuttgart 1927 (On death).
- Über plastischen Daumenersatz insbesondere bei Verlust des ganzen Daumenstrahles. Archiv für orthopädische und Unfall-Chirurgie, München 1921, 19: 198–214 (Plastic replacement of thumb, etc.).
