= Scrotectomy =

Surgical procedure

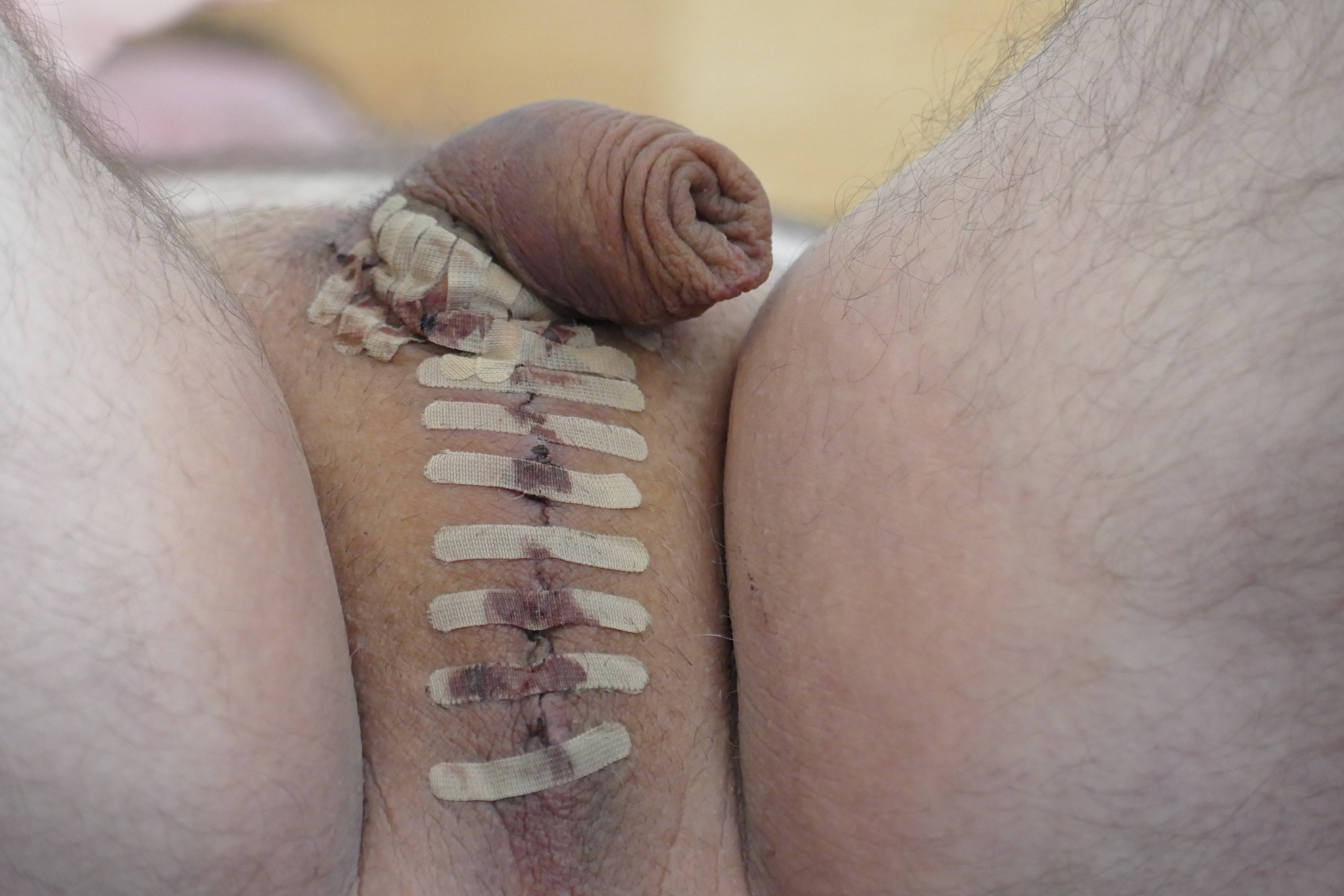
Scrotal area following a complete scrotectomy

Scrotectomy (/skroʊˈtɛktəmi/) is a surgery to remove all or part of the scrotum. The removal of all scrotal skin is known as a complete scrotectomy, while the partial removal of scrotal skin is known as a partial scrotectomy. Scrotectomy may be performed with or without orchiectomy (removal of one of both testicles).

Scrotectomy may be performed for a variety of reasons, including:

- As a cosmetic procedure.
- As treatment for diseases of the scrotum and/or testicles such as cancer, Fournier gangrene, hidradenitis suppurativa, lymphedema, or lymphangitis.
- As treatment for severe injury of the scrotum and/or testicles.
- As gender-affirming surgery.
