= Legg–Calvé–Perthes disease =

Osteochondrosis that results in death and fracture located in hip joint

Legg–Calvé–Perthes syndrome
- Other names: Perthes disease or Legg–Perthes disease or idiopathic avascular necrosis of the hip
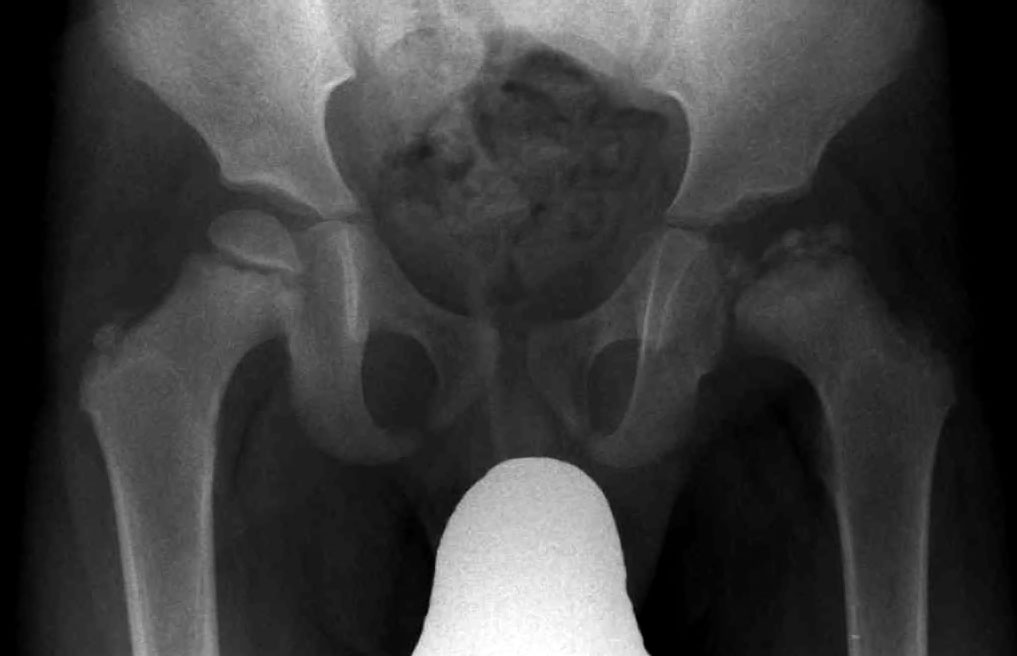
- Radiograph of a person with Legg–Calvé–Perthes disease
- Pronunciation: /ˈlɛɡ kælˈveɪ ˈpɜːrtiːz/
- Specialty: Orthopedics
- Symptoms: Pain in the hip, knee, ankle (hip pathology can refer pain to a normal knee or ankle), or groin.
- Usual onset: 4 to 8 years
- Causes: Artery of the ligmentum teres femoris being constricted or even blocked too early
- Diagnostic method: X-Ray
- Treatment: Orthotics
- Frequency: 1/25,000 in boys and 1/100,000 in girls

Legg–Calvé–Perthes disease (LCPD) or idiopathic avascular necrosis of the hip is a childhood hip disorder initiated by a disruption of blood flow to the head of the femur. Due to the lack of blood flow, the bone dies (osteonecrosis or avascular necrosis) and stops growing. Over time, healing occurs by new blood vessels infiltrating the dead bone and removing the necrotic bone which leads to a loss of bone mass and a weakening of the femoral head.

The condition is most commonly found in children between the ages of 4 and 8, but it can occur in children between the ages of 2 and 15. It can produce a permanent deformity of the femoral head, which increases the risk of developing osteoarthritis in adults. Perthes is a form of osteochondritis which affects only the hip. Bilateral Perthes, which means both hips are affected, should always be investigated to rule out multiple epiphyseal dysplasia.

== Signs and symptoms ==
The condition is most commonly found in children between the ages of 4 and 10. Common symptoms include pain in the hip, knee, or ankle (since hip pathology can cause pain to be felt in a normal knee or ankle), or in the groin; this pain is exacerbated by hip or leg movement, especially internal hip rotation (with the knee flexed 90°, twisting the lower leg away from the center of the body). The range of motion is reduced, particularly in abduction and internal rotation, and the patient presents with a limp. Pain is usually mild. Atrophy of thigh muscles may occur from disuse and an inequality of leg length. In some cases, some activity can cause severe irritation or inflammation of the damaged area, including standing, walking, running, kneeling, or stooping repeatedly for an extended period. In cases exhibiting severe femoral osteonecrosis, pain is usually a chronic, throbbing sensation exacerbated by activity

The first signs are complaints of soreness from the child, which are often dismissed as growing pains, and limping or other joint guarding, particularly when tired. The pain is usually in the hip, but can also be felt in the knee (referred pain). In some cases, pain is felt in the unaffected hip and leg, due to the children favoring their injured side and placing the majority of their weight on their "good" leg. It is predominantly a disease of boys (4:1 ratio). Perthes is generally diagnosed between 5 and 12 years of age, although it has been diagnosed as early as 18 months. Typically, the disease is only seen in one hip, but bilateral Perthes is seen in about 10% of children diagnosed.

== Cause ==
Perthes disease is a childhood hip disorder initiated by a disruption of blood flow to the head of the femur. Due to the lack of blood flow, the bone dies (osteonecrosis or avascular necrosis) and stops growing.

Legg believed the cause was impairment of blood supply to the femoral epiphysis, Calvé believed rickets, and Perthes deduced an infection possibly causing degenerative arthritis leads to LCP disease. Currently, a number of factors have been implicated, including heredity, trauma, endocrine dysfunction, inflammation, nutrition, and altered circulatory hemodynamics. Risk factors are not limited to impaired and disproportionate growth, low birth weight, delayed skeletal maturity, short stature, systemic hormonal changes, and low economic index. Although no one has identified the cause of Perthes disease, a reduction in blood flow to the joint is known.

The disease is theorized to include the artery of the ligamentum teres femoris being constricted or even blocked too early, not allowing for time when the medial circumflex femoral artery takes over. The medial circumflex femoral artery is the principal source of blood supply to the femoral head. LCP disease is a vascular restrictive condition of idiopathic nature. Symptoms like femoral head disfigurement, flattening, and collapse occur typically between ages four and ten, mostly male children of Caucasian descent. Children affected by LCP disease often display uneven gait and limited range of motion, and they experience mild to severe pain in the groin area. For example, a child may be six years old chronologically but may have grown only four years old in terms of bone maturity. The child may then engage in activities appropriate for a six-year-old child, but lacking the bone strength of an older child, these activities may lead to flattening or fracture of the hip joint. Genetics do not appear to be a determining factor, but a deficiency of blood factors with anticoagulant property used to disperse blood clots may lead to blockages in the vessels supplying the joint. A deficiency of protein C and protein S, which also act as blood anticoagulants, may also exist; if that were the case, their deficiency could cause clot formation in ligamentum teres femoris artery and hinder blood supply to the femoral head. However, no evidence of this has been found; over the years, many theories have been published, but none has stood up to professional research.

== Pathology ==
Over time, healing occurs by new blood vessels infiltrating the dead bone and removing the necrotic bone which leads to a loss of bone mass and a weakening of the femoral head. The bone loss leads to some degree of collapse and deformity of the femoral head and sometimes secondary changes to the shape of the hip socket.

It is also referred to as idiopathic avascular osteonecrosis of the capital femoral epiphysis of the femoral head since the cause of the interruption of the blood supply of the head of the femur in the hip joint is unknown. Perthes can produce a permanent deformity of the femoral head, which increases the risk of developing osteoarthritis in adults. Perthes is a form of osteochondritis which only affects the hip, although other forms of osteochondritis can affect elbows, knees, ankles, and feet. Bilateral Perthes, which means both hips are affected, should always be investigated thoroughly to rule out multiple epiphyseal dysplasia.

== Diagnosis ==
X-rays of the hip may suggest and/or verify the diagnosis. X-rays usually demonstrate a flattened, and later fragmented, femoral head. A bone scan or MRI may be useful in making the diagnosis in those cases where X-rays are inconclusive. Usually, plain radiographic changes are delayed six weeks or more from clinical onset, so bone scintigraphy and MRI are done for early diagnosis. MRI results are more accurate, i.e. 97–99% against 88–93% in plain radiography. If MRI or bone scans are necessary, a positive diagnosis relies upon patchy areas of vascularity to the capital femoral epiphysis (the developing femoral head).

== Treatment ==
The goals of treatment are to decrease pain, reduce the loss of hip motion, and prevent or minimize permanent femoral head deformity so that the risk of developing a severe degenerative arthritis as an adult can be reduced. Assessment by a pediatric orthopaedic surgeon is recommended to evaluate risks and treatment options. Younger children have a better prognosis than older children.

There is no high quality evidence to guide treatments, though a nationwide study (called a randomised controlled trial) has recently started throughout the UK, which could improve the evidence in future - called the OpNonSTOP study (see research direction). Until then, treatment decisions are based largely on case series and experience.

Treatment has historically centered on removing mechanical pressure from the joint until the disease has run its course. Options include traction (to separate the femur from the pelvis and reduce wear), braces (often for several months, with an average of 18 months) to restore range of motion, physiotherapy, and surgical intervention when necessary because of permanent joint damage. To maintain activities of daily living, custom orthotics may be used. Overnight traction may be used in lieu of walking devices or in combination. These devices internally rotate the femoral head and abduct the leg(s) at 45°. Orthoses can start as proximal as the lumbar spine, and extend the length of the limbs to the floor. Most functional bracing is achieved using a waist belt and thigh cuffs derived from the Scottish-Rite orthosis. These devices are typically prescribed by a physician and implemented by an orthotist. Clinical results of the Scottish Rite orthosis have not been good according to some studies, and its use has gone out of favor. Many children, especially those with the onset of the disease before age 6, need no intervention at all and are simply asked to refrain from contact sports or games which impact the hip. For older children (onset of Perthes after age 6), the best treatment option remains unclear. Current treatment options for older children over age 8 include prolonged periods without weight bearing, osteotomy (femoral, pelvic, or shelf), and the hip distraction method using an external fixator which relieves the hip from carrying the body's weight. This allows room for the top of the femur to regrow.

While running and high-impact sports are not recommended during treatment for Perthes disease, children can remain active through a variety of other activities that limit mechanical stress on the hip joint. Swimming is highly recommended, as it allows exercise of the hip muscles with full range of motion while reducing the stress to a minimum. Cycling is another good option as it also keeps stress to a minimum. Physiotherapy generally involves a series of daily exercises, with weekly meetings with a physiotherapist to monitor progress. These exercises focus on improving and maintaining a full range of motion of the femur within the hip socket. Performing these exercises during the healing process is essential to ensure that the femur and hip socket have a perfectly smooth interface. This will minimize the long-term effects of the disease. Use of bisphosphonate such as zoledronate or ibandronate is currently being investigated, but definite recommendations are not yet available.

Perthes disease is self-limiting, but if the head of femur is left deformed, long-term problems can occur. Treatment is aimed at minimizing damage while the disease runs its course, not at 'curing' the disease. It is recommended not to use steroids or alcohol as these reduce oxygen in the blood which is needed in the joint. As those affected age, problems in the knee and back can arise secondary to abnormal posture and stride adopted to protect the affected joint. The condition is also linked to arthritis of the hip, though this appears not to be an inevitable consequence. Hip replacements are relatively common as the already damaged hip experiences routine wear; this varies by individual, but generally is required any time after age 50.

== Prognosis ==
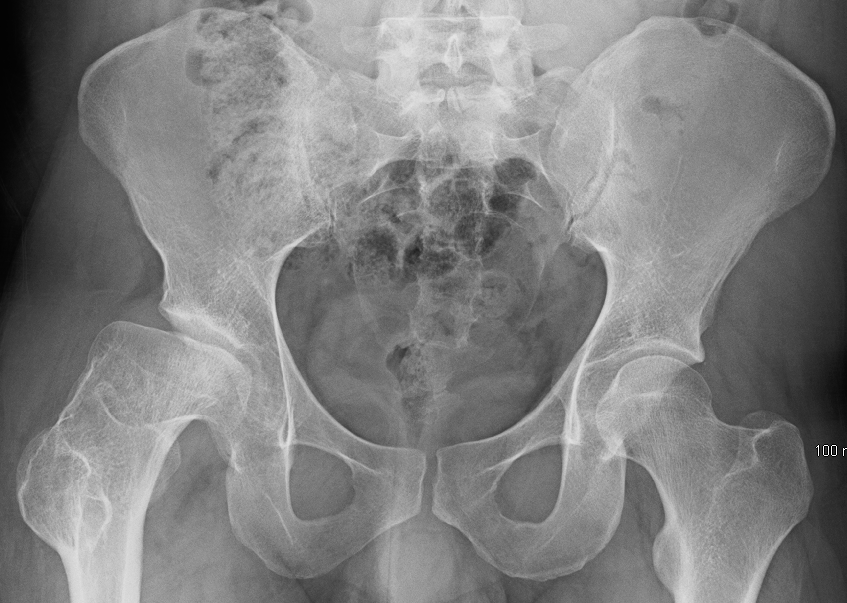
X ray of deformity by Legg–Calvé–Perthes disease of the right hip (left side of X-ray)

Children younger than six have the best prognosis, since they have time for the dead bone to revascularize and remodel, with a good chance that the femoral head will recover and remain spherical after resolution of the disease. Children who have been diagnosed with Perthes' disease after the age of ten are at a very high risk of developing osteoarthritis and coxa magna. When an LCP disease diagnosis occurs after age eight, a better outcome results with surgery rather than nonoperative treatments. Shape of femoral head at the time when Legg-Calvé Perthes disease heals is the most important determinant of risk for degenerative arthritis; hence, the shape of femoral head and congruence of hip are most useful outcome measures.

== Epidemiology ==
Perthes' disease is one of the most common hip disorders in young children, occurring in roughly 5.5 of 100,000 children per year. The lifetime risk of a child developing the disease is about one per 1,200 individuals. Boys are affected about three to five times more often than girls. New cases of Perthes' disease rarely occur after age 14 years (if diagnosed after 14 years of age, then it is usually old disease from early in childhood or avascular necrosis from an alternative cause). White northern Europeans appear to be affected more frequently than other ethnicities, though a paucity of reliable epidemiology exists in the Southern Hemisphere. Children of those with the disease themselves may have a very slightly increased risk, though it is unclear if this is because of a genetic predisposition, or a shared environmental factor. It is most commonly seen in persons aged three to twelve years, with a median of six years of age. The UK incidence rates show an intriguing pattern with low incidence rates in London, and a progressive increase in disease in more northerly areas (maximal in Scotland). Some evidence suggests, at least in developed countries, more socioeconomically deprived communities have a greater risk of disease (a similar trend to diseases such as adult heart disease), though the reason for this remains unknown. One possible explanation that has been considered is tobacco smoke exposure, though this is significantly confounded by the strong socioeconomic gradient common to both smoking and Perthes' disease.

== History ==
- 1897: The disease was first described by Karel Maydl (1853–1903).
- 1909: Henning Waldenström (1877–1972) described the disease, attributing it to tuberculosis.
- 1910: The disease was recognized as being unrelated to tuberculosis by three physicians working independently. Legg–Calvé–Perthes is named after these three doctors: Arthur Legg (1874–1939), Jacques Calvé (1875–1954), and Georg Perthes (1869–1927).

== Research directions ==
The only Level I study to ever recruit in Perthes' disease has recently opened In the UK - the OpNonSTOP. This is a study funded by the National Institute for Health Research (NIHR), that is running throughout the UK . The OpNonSTOP study compares surgical containment to active containment (optimised therapy without surgery). The study is expected to recruit patients between 2024 and 2027, and will be the first high-quality level-I study ever produced in Perthes' disease, influencing the care of children throughout the world. The OpNonSTOP study follows a prior UK study, which was a nationwide cohort study that collected details of every case of Perthes' disease - called the British Orthopaedic Surgery Surveillance (BOSS) Study. Every hospital in England, Scotland, and Wales which treated Perthes' disease collected details of new cases, with the BOSS study demonstrating the major variation in treatment across the UK, with no clear benefit of surgery over non-surgical care.

== Dogs ==
LCP disease is an avascular necrosis of the femoral head in small-breed dogs, usually those weighing up to 25 lbs. LCP disease was first described in veterinary literature by Tutt in 1935. Tutt described the disease as almost exactly what Waldenstromin (1909) described in humans. Small breeds, particularly Toy Poodles, Yorkshire Terriers, Pugs, Jack Russell Terriers, West Highland White Terriers, and Dachshunds can be affected. No sex predilection is seen in the dog as contrasted to humans, in whom an 80% male incidence of the disease is evident. Similar to children, however, the condition is usually unilateral, with only 12-16% incidence of bilateral disease. The age of onset varies between 4 and 12 months, with a peak incidence around 7 months. The pathology of avascular necrosis followed by revascularization and bony remodeling of the femoral head in the dog certainly suggests a vascular etiology, though the cause of the condition is not completely understood. X-rays are necessary to make the diagnosis and show increased opacity and focal lysis in the head of the femur, and later in the disease, collapse and fracture of the neck of the femur. The recommended treatment is surgical removal of the head of the femur, but conservative treatment (rest, exercise restriction, and pain medication) may be effective in a limited number of cases (less than 25%, according to some studies). In dogs, the prognosis is excellent with surgery. Prednisolone tablets may also be helpful.

== See also ==
- Sergei Lysov (born 2004), Israeli wheelchair tennis player and Paralympian with Legg–Calvé–Perthes disease
