= Óscar Moreno =

- Born: 16 November 1878; Porto, Portugal
- Died: 26 May 1971 (aged 92); Porto, Portugal
- Education: University of Paris; University of Porto
- Scientific career
- Fields: Medicine, Chemistry
- Workplaces: University of Paris; University of Porto

Óscar Moreno (16 November 1878 – 26 May 1971) was a Portuguese urologist, physician, scientist and chemist.

== Early life ==
Moreno was born in Porto, in the parish of Victoria, the son of Jose Lourenço Russo, and Lucinda de Sousa Martins Ribeiro. His uncle (on his mother's side) was Rodrigo de Sousa Moreno, doctor of the medical school of Porto and administrator of the county of Gondomar.

== Studies ==
Influenced by his uncle, he started his medical studies in the School of Medicine and Surgery of Porto. On completing the course of medicine in 1908 as a student of Roberto Frias, he attended the Medical School of Paris (Necker Hospital) as a student of Marie Curie. There he specialized in urology, completing his doctorate in medicine in the year of 1911. His thesis "About Kidney Functions" received the best classification.

== Career ==
Moreno was monitor of the Urinary service in the Medical School of Paris (Necker Hospital) from 1908 to 1911. He was also hired to be Professor of Urology at the School of Medicine of Porto, from 1917 to 1948, the first professor to occupy that position in the School of Medicine of Porto. He founded and directed the Department of Urology in the General Hospital of Santo António (1924), originally called the Department of Urology and Venerology.

Moreno devoted his work in particular to the exploitation of functional kidneys, and contributed to the discovery of "Ambard constant," also called the "Ambard-Moreno constant," with Leon Ambard which is used to assess the state of operation of the kidney.

He died in Porto, in the parish of Victoria.

== Scientific papers ==
Moreno published numerous scientific papers, published in Portugal and abroad:

- "Volume et des urines maximum concentration. Signification diagnosed de la pyurie", in collaboration with Heitz Boyer, Médicale Presse, March 29, 1911;
- "Des injections de pâte bismuthée en chirurgie urinaire", in collaboration with Heitz Boyer, Anal. des evil. des voies urinaires, 11, 1910;
- "Comparaison du fonctionnement rénal avant et après la néphrectomie", in collaboration with Chevassu, Revue de Gynécologie, 1911.

== Bibliography ==
=== Portuguese bibliography ===
- Anuário académico - Academia das ciências de Lisboa; Academia das Ciências de Lisboa 1943, p. 230
- Bueno, Francisco da Silveira, Grande dicionário etimológico-prosódico da língua portuguêsa, 1963
- Carvalho, F. Pinto, Contribuiçâo para a Historia da Urologia em Portugal, Imprensa Nacional-Casa da Moeda, Lisbon 2003
- Grande Enciclopédia Portuguesa Brasileira; vol 17 p. 877
- Macedo, Manuel Machado; História da Medicina em Portugal no século XX; CTT Correios, Lisbon 1998, p. 113
- Quem é alguém: Who's who in Portugal 1947, p. 41

=== French bibliography ===
- Annales de physiologie et de physicochimie biologique – p. 656 – 1936
- Journal médical français – p. 444 -1919
- Journal de chirurgie – p. 199, 645 por Pierre-Joseph Desault – 1936
- Travaux annuels de l'Hôpital d'urologie et de chirurgie urinaire (Paris, France) 1920 – p. 224
- Journal de pharmacie et de chimie – p. 38 por Société de pharmacie de Paris – 1922
- Journal de pharmacie et de chimie – p. 38 por Société de pharmacie de Paris – 1942
- Revue belge des sciences medicales – p. 625 por Albert Lemaire, Société de médecine de Gand, Société scientifique de Bruxelles. Section médicale – 1936
- Archives provinciales de chirurgie – p. 148, 1913
- Annales de la Société scientifique de Bruxelles – p. 61 por Société scientifique de Bruxelles – 1929
- Mémoires de la Société royale des sciences de Liège – p. 5, por Société royale des sciences de Liège – 1957
- Journal de physiologie, por Association des physiologistes (France) – 1926, p. 633
- Congrès français de médecine. v.1, 1911
- Bulletin des sciences pharmacologiques – p. 549, 1911
- Annales des maladies des organes génito-urinaires – p. 28, 1911
- Catalogue général des livres imprimés de la Bibliothèque nationale, pela Bibliothèque nationale (France). Département des imprimés, Léopold Delisle, *France Ministère de l'instruction publique, Paris (France) Ministère de l'éducation nationale – 1933, p. 520
- Revue sud-américaine de médecine et de chirurgie – p. 651, 1934
- Biologie médicale: revue bimestrielle des sciences biologique considerée – p. 160, 1913
- Revista de medicina y cirugia practicas – p. 60, 1919
- Le Rôle de l'urée en pathologie – p. 24, por Ch Achard, Charles Achard – 1912
- Acta Urologica Belgica – p. 738, pela Société belge d'urologie – 1946
- Bibliographia Physiologica por Concilium Bibliographicum, Zurich – 1912, p. 252
- Comptes rendus des séances de la Société de biologie et de ses filiales – p. 74 pela Société de biologie et de ses filiales, Société de biologie, *Paris, Société de biologie (Paris, France). – 1916
- Physiologie normale et pathologique des reins – p. 90 por Léon Ambard – 1931
- Precis de pathologie chirurgicale. v.4, 1920-21 – p. 8

1921

=== English bibliography ===
- Chemical Abstracts, de American Chemical Society, American Chemical Society Chemical Abstracts Service – 1990
- Journal of the American Medical Association, por American Medical Association – 1912, p. 230
- American journal of diseases of children – p. 362 por American Medical Association – 1911
- American journal of diseases of children – p. 26 por American Medical Association – 1913
- Index catalogue of the library of the surgeon-general's office, United States Army - Library of the Surgeon-General's Office (U.S.)- Edição de U.S.G.P.O., 1914
- Surgery, gynecology & obstetrics, por Franklin H. Martin Memorial Foundation, American College of Surgeons – 1917
- Practice of Medicine – p. 277, por Frederick Tice – 1922
- Functional diagnosis – p. 306, por Max Kahn – 1920

=== German bibliography ===
- Berichte ueber die gesamte physiologie und experimentelle – p. 518, 1920
- Zeitschrift für urologische chirurgie und gynaekologische urologie – p. 158, 1917
- Biochemische Zeitschrift – p. 365, 1913
- Index zum Diabetes mellitus: eine internationale Bibliographie – p. 717, por Joseph Schumacher – 1961
- Jahresbericht über die Fortschritte auf dem Gebiete der Chirurgie – p. 850, editado por Otto Hildebrand – 1914
- Biochemische Zeitschrift – p. 200, 1921
- Folia urologica: Internationales Archiv für die Krankheiten der Harnorgane – p. 180, por Gustav Kulisch – 1918

Zentralblatt der experimentellen Medizin (experimentelle Pathologie und ...) – 1912, p. 276 Urologischer Jahresbericht – p. 56, 1913

- Frommel, Richard - Jahresbericht über die Fortschritt auf dem Gebiete der Geburtshilfe und Gynäkologie, edição de J.F. Bergmann, 1928 – p. 307
- Zentralblatt für Gynaekologie – p. 453, 1915
- Zentralblatt für chirurgie – p. 825, 1911
- Zeitschrift für urologie – p. 875, 1914
- Zeitschrift für experimentelle pathologie und therapie – p. 272, 1914
- Jahresbericht Geburtshilfe und Gynaekologie – p. 307, 1912
- Kliniske Studier over Nyrefunktionen hos Nephrectomerede – p. 32, por Erling Andreas Schroeder – 1944
- Bibliographie der fremdsprachigen Zeitschriftenliteratur, 1937, p. 218

=== Spanish bibliography ===
- Revista española de Medicina y cirugia - editado por Ramón Torres Casanovas – 1919, p. 283
- González, Agustín Mateo - Eclampsia puerperal – 1916, p. 84

=== Italian bibliography ===
- Archivio italiano di urologia e nefrologia, 1926 – p. 205
- Policlinico: sezione chirurgica – p. 174
- Clinica chirurgica - Istituto di patologica chirurgica, Rome 1928 – p. 732
- Revista Stiintelor Medicale, 1928 – p. 299

=== Russian bibliography ===
- Bolʹshai︠a︡ medit︠s︡inskai︠a︡ ėnt︠s︡iklopedii︠a︡:Glav – p. 886, por Aleksandr Nikolaevich Bakulev – 1956
