= Jean-François-Auguste Le Dentu =

French surgeon (1841–1926)

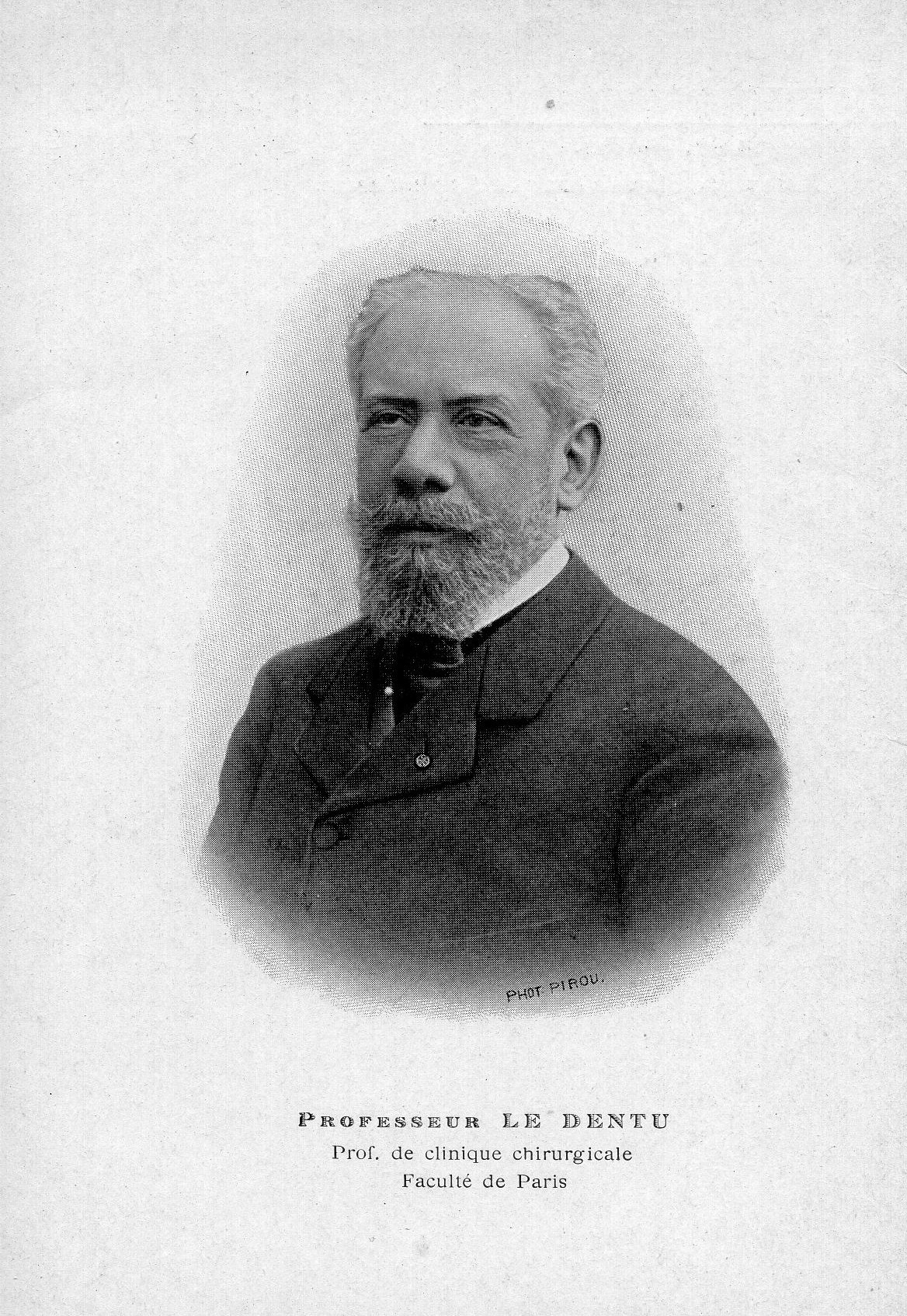
- Born: Jean François-Auguste Le Dentu; 21 June 1841; Basse-Terre (Kingdom of France)
- Died: 23 October 1926 (aged 85)
- Occupation: Surgeon
- Employer: University of Paris Faculty of Medicine (1890–1904)
- Awards: Commander of the Legion of Honour (1911); honorary doctorate at the Laval University (1900)

Jean-François-Auguste Le Dentu (21 June 1841, in Basse-Terre (Guadeloupe) – 26 October 1926, in Paris) was a French surgeon.

== Biography ==
Beginning in 1863, he was an interne of medicine in Paris, later serving as an aide of anatomy (1864) and as a prosector to the medical faculty (1867). In 1867, he received his doctorate with a thesis on venous circulation of the foot and leg, two years later obtaining his agrégation in surgery with the dissertation Des anomalies du testicule (testicular anomalies).

In 1872, he became a surgeon to the "Bureau central", followed by a promotion as chirurgien des hôpitaux in 1876. Subsequently, he was appointed professor to the medical faculty in Paris; second chair of clinical surgery at Hôpital Necker (1890–1904), followed by an assignment as chair of clinical surgery at the Hôtel-Dieu (1904–1908).

Le Dentu is remembered for contributions made in the field of urosurgery; in 1875 being credited with achieving the first recorded occurrence of cure by nephrectomy in France, and in 1898, with Joaquín Albarrán (1860–1912), performing the first nephroureterectomy for upper tract urothelial cancer.

== Written works ==
He was the author of numerous articles in the fields of surgery and urology. With Pierre Delbet (1861-1957) and others, he published the multi-volume Traité de chirurgie clinique et opératoire (1901 et seq.). He made significant contributions to Sigismond Jaccoud's Nouveau dictionnaire de medecine et de chirurgie. Other publications by Le Dentu include:

- Traité des maladies des voies urinaires, 1868-1881 - Diseases of the urinary tract.
- Contribution à l'histoire de l'extraction des calculs du rein, 1882 - Contribution to the history of kidney stone extraction.
- Néphrectomie, 1885 - Nephrectomy.
- Affections chirurgicales des reins, des uretères et des capsules surrénales, 1889 - Surgical disorders of the kidneys, ureter and adrenals.
- Du Traitement des affections inflammatoires des annexes de l'utérus, 1892 - Treatment of inflammatory diseases of the uterine adnexa.
