= Urethrostomy =

Surgical procedure

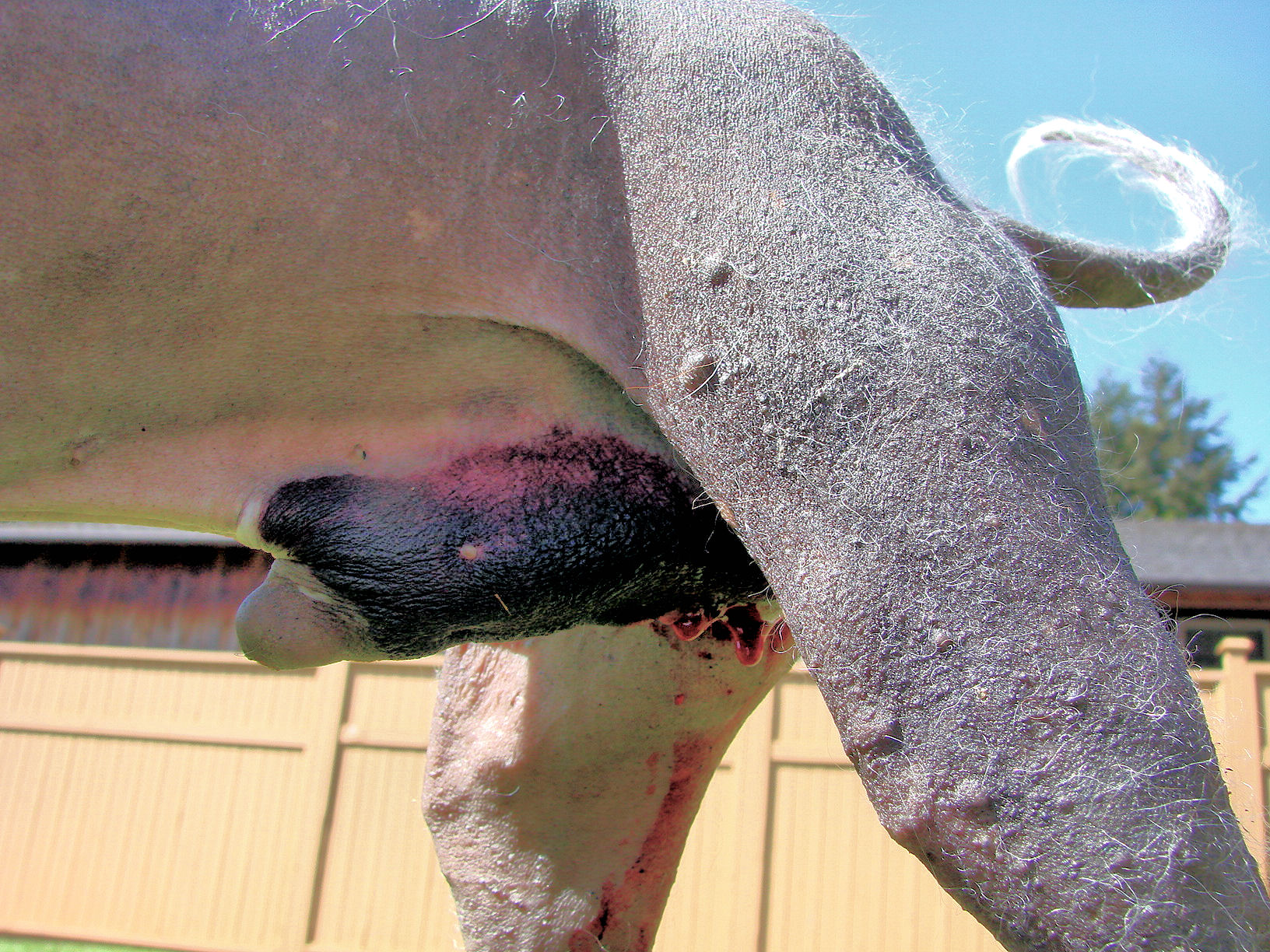
Recently completed scrotal urethrostomy on a dog

Urethrostomy is a surgical procedure that creates a permanent opening in the urethra, commonly to remove obstructions to urine flow. The procedure is most often performed in male cats, where the opening is made in the perineum.

== History ==
For many years perineal urethrostomy has been used in cattle, sheep and goats, especially young males that have been castrated at a young age, for obstruction by uroliths. However, the anatomy of the male cat is quite different and the urethra is very small in diameter.

Perineal urethrostomy in the male cat was developed in 1962 and published in the Journal of the American Veterinary Medical Association in 1963. It was modified in 1967, and further modified in 1971.

== Pre-surgical considerations ==
Since animals are potentially suffering from severe metabolic derangements at the time of initial presentation, animals need to be stabilized prior to surgery. Common physiologic derangements noted on bloodwork are elevated kidneys values (azotemia) and elevated potassium levels (hyperkalemia). The presence of profound sedation, low body temperature, and/or a slow heart rate (bradycardia) are usually associated with more severe blood derangements.

Ideally, the urethral obstruction is removed or temporarily bypassed with urethral flushing (urohydropulsion) and the placement of an in-dwelling urinary catheter prior to surgery. This catheter allows urine to be removed from the body, and, along with fluid therapy, help normalize blood derangements to resolve prior to anesthesia. There are many types of catheters commonly used, including common red rubber catheters, stiff Tomcat catheters, soft and flexible Cook catheters or semi-rigid "Slippery Sam" catheters.

Sedation is usually required for urohydropulsion and the placement of a urinary catheter due to the associated pain with the procedure. A combination of injectable ketamine and diazepam is a safer option for sedation considering its reduced cardiopulmary depression effects compared to other anesthetics. A combination of etomidate and diazepam would be an even safer anesthetic consideration, but etomidate is not commonly carried by general veterinary practitioners due to its cost.

Fluid therapy is equally essential for correcting derangements. Commonly, a fluid low in potassium, such as 0.9% NaCl, is selected. If 0.9% NaCl is not available, any other crystalloid fluid is realistic even if it contains some level of potassium. Insulin is sometimes used intravenously to temporarily reduce high potassium levels. Calcium gluconate can also be used to protect the myocardium (heart muscle) from the negative effects of hyperkalemia.

Rarely, an urethral obstruction cannot not be removed on initial presentation and emergency surgery must be performed immediately to return urethral patency and save the animal's life. These animals are at a much higher risk under anesthesia.

== Surgical technique ==
The cat can be placed in either dorsal or ventral recumbency. An elliptical incision is made around the base of the cat's penis and scrotum. If the cat has not been neutered previously, it must be neutered before the perineal urethrostomy can be performed. A combination of sharp and blunt dissection is started ventrally (the underside of the penis) to expose the penis' muscular and soft tissue attachments to the pelvis. After removing these soft tissue attachments to the pelvis, dissection is continued dorsally (on top of the penis) to remove the dorsal retractor penile muscle and other soft tissue covering the site of the required urethral incision.

All of these dissection steps are necessary to free the penis from the pelvis, allowing the veterinarian to move the significantly wider pelvic urethra caudally (or rearward) so it can be attached to the skin.

After the penile body is freed, a dorsal incision is started at the tip of the penis using either a small scalpel blade or fine ophthalmic scissors. This incision is extended to a level at or above the bulbourethral glands. At this level, the urethra is considered wide enough to create an adequate stoma, or urethral opening. The urethra is sutured to the skin for approximately 2 cm using a fine suture on a taper needle (i.e. 4-0 PDS). The remainder of the penis is amputated and any remaining skin defect is closed.

As the surgery site heals, the urethral mucosa and skin will heal together creating a permanent stoma. This stoma (opening) is much larger than the original penile urethra making it unlikely for the animal to obstruct in the future.

A urinary catheter may be placed following surgery for the initial 12–24 hours of recovery. This catheter should not be left in longer than this though, as it will increase the likelihood of stricture formation at the surgery site. Animals should wear an e-collar until sutures are removed in 10–14 days.

== Post-operative complications ==
Initial post-operative complications include wound infection and excessive pain or bleeding. These can be controlled commonly with appropriate prescription medications or ice packs if the animal will tolerate them. A more concerning, though not common, complication is stricture, or narrowing, of the surgery site. The formation of a stricture will require additional procedures to either try and salvage the initial surgery site or create a new urethral opening (or stoma) under the floor of the pelvis (subpelvic urethrostomy) or immediately in front of the pubic bone (prepubic urethrostomy).

The most common long term complication associated with this surgery is an increased incidence of urinary tract infections.
