= Nikolaus Rüdinger =

German anatomist and university professor (1832–1896)

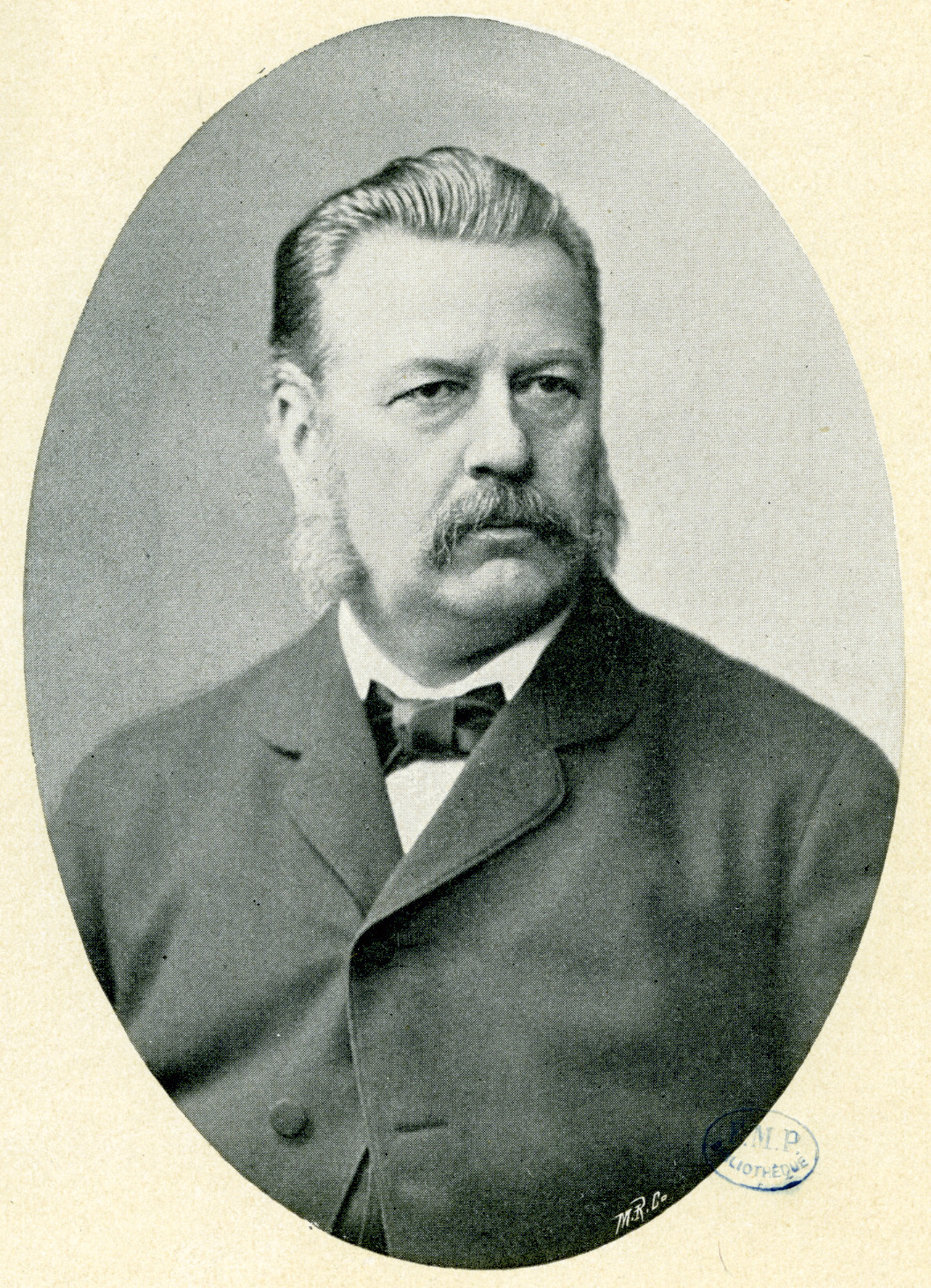
- Born: 25 March 1832; Bingen am Rhein, Grand Duchy of Hesse
- Died: 25 August 1896 (aged 64); Tutzing, German Empire
- Education: Heidelberg University, University of Giessen

Nikolaus Rüdinger (25 March 1832 – 25 August 1896) was a German anatomist born in Bingen am Rhein, in the Grand Duchy of Hesse (present-day Rhineland-Palatinate).

He studied at Heidelberg University and the University of Giessen. In 1855, he worked as a prosector at the Ludwig-Maximilians-Universität München, where in 1870 he was appointed as a professor of anatomy and second curator of the anatomical institute.

Rüdinger is credited for introducing a new method for preservation of corpses in the dissecting room. This procedure involved injections of carbolic acid mixed with glycerine and alcohol. In addition, he is remembered for using photography for anatomical diagnoses. He died in Tutzing on 25 August 1896 at the age of 64.

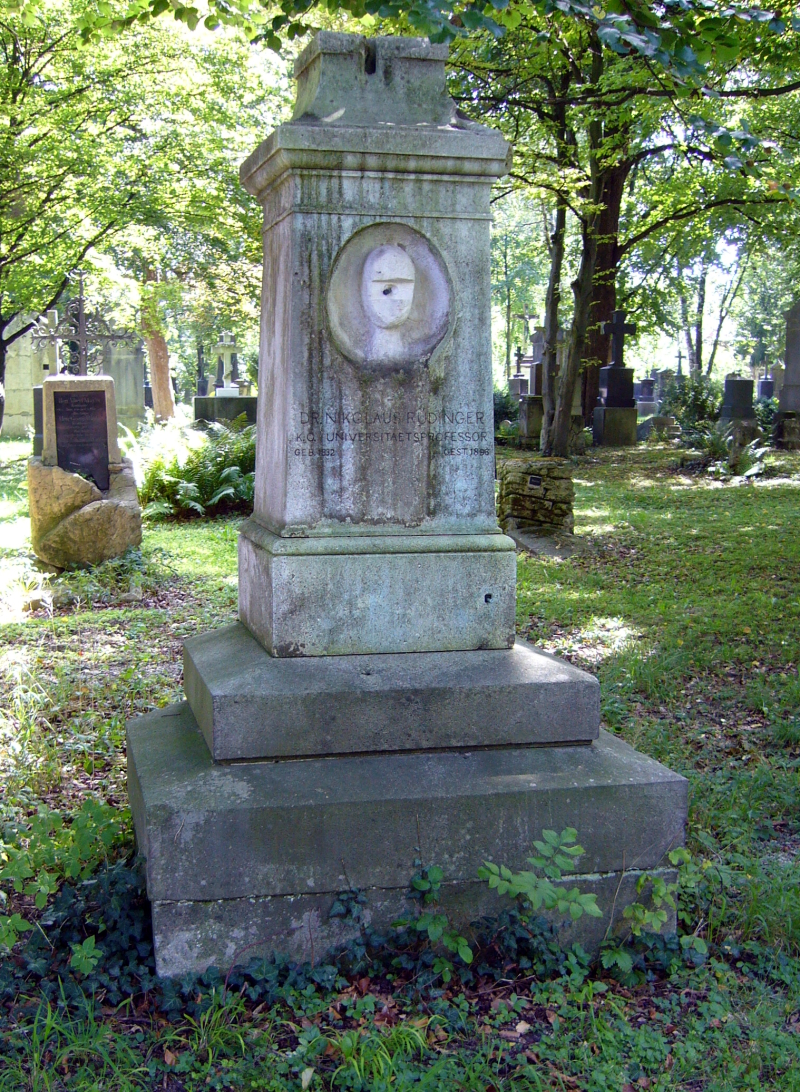
Grave site of Rüdinger at Alten Südfriedhof in Munich; section 17, series 13, grave 38/39.

== Selected publications ==
- "Anatomie des peripherischen Nervensystems des menschlichen Körpers" (Anatomy of the peripheral nervous system of human corpses), two volumes- 1870
- "Atlas des peripherischen Nervensystems" (Atlas of the peripheral nervous system), 1872
- "Atlas des menschlichen Gehörorgans" (Atlas of the human hearing organs), 1867–70
- "Topographisch-chirurgische Anatomie des Menschen" (Topographical-surgical anatomy of humans), 1870–78
- "Beitrag zur Morpholegte des Gaumsegels und des Verdauungsapparats", (Contributions to the morphology of the soft palate and the digestive apparatus), 1879
- "Beitrag zur Anatomie der Affenspalte und der Interparietalfurche", 1882
- "Beitrag zur Anatomie des Sprachzentrums" (Contributions to the anatomy of the language center), 1882
- "Zur Anatomie der Prostata" (The Anatomy of the prostate), 1883
