= Rose Leiman Goldemberg =

American dramatist (1928–2025)

- Born: Rose Marion Leiman; May 17, 1928; New York City, U.S.
- Died: July 21, 2025 (aged 97); Cape May, New Jersey, U.S.
- Occupations: Playwright, screenwriter, author, poet
- Spouse(s): Raymond Schiller (m. 1949; div. 1968) Robert Golbemberg (m. 1969; div. 1989)
- Writing career
- Notable awards: Writers Guild of America Award, 2 Emmy Award Nominations, Humanitas Prize Nomination, American Women in Radio and Television Award, Humanitarian Award for Drama

Rose Marion Leiman Goldemberg (May 17, 1928 – July 21, 2025) was an American playwright, screenwriter, poet and author of fiction and non-fiction books and stories.

Goldemberg's stageplays frequently incorporate biographical material, as with Sophie (1987), about entertainer Sophie Tucker; and Picon Pie (2004), about Yiddish theater actress Molly Picon. Her plays have been produced widely off-Broadway, in venues throughout the United States, and internationally.

Goldemberg's 1979 staged reading of excerpts, Letters Home, based on the book of collected correspondence between Sylvia Plath and her mother, has been translated into numerous languages and been honored all over the world.

Goldemberg's most prominent work for television was The Burning Bed (1984), a TV movie based on the true story of a survivor of domestic violence, played by Farrah Fawcett. Another well-known television movie written by Goldemberg, Stone Pillow (1985), starred Lucille Ball as a homeless woman. Other screenplays written by Goldemberg include Land of Hope (1976), and Mother and Daughter: The Loving War (1980). Goldemberg was more involved with the production and filming of television movies, mini-series, and shows than is typical for screenwriters, making cast recommendations and visiting the sets. Most of her screenplays are dramas.

Goldemberg also taught the subjects of English and Theater at the City College of New York and Fairleigh Dickinson University. She was a published author of such books as Adios, Hollywood and Antique Jewelry: A Practical & Passionate Guide. She was also an award-winning poet and author of short stories.

== Early years ==
Rose Leiman was born on May 17, 1928 in the Port Richmond neighborhood of Staten Island, New York. She started writing at the age of five, and entered Brooklyn College in 1944 at the age of 16. After receiving her BA (magna cum laude) from Brooklyn College, she attended Ohio State University on a teaching assistantship and received her MA. Upon graduating she started working at the newly formed TV Guide, where she reviewed TV scripts and wrote plot summaries. It was there that she decided to become a screenwriter. She studied at the American Theatre Wing and Columbia University, and studied under Lee Strasberg and Ira Cirker. She began her screenwriting career by writing religious TV scripts for Pamela Ilott at CBS.

== Career ==
Goldemberg's Gandhiji was chosen for the O'Neill Conference in 1970. At the time, she was a mother and a full-time teacher, along with being a playwright. Gandhiji premiered in 1977 at Back Alley's downtown studio, 617 F St. NW, Washington D.C. It garnered a Robby Award, and helped to establish Goldemberg as a dramatist. Gandhiji was also honored in Burns Mantle's "Best Plays of 1982-1983."

Land of Hope was a pilot for a television series written by Goldemberg, which aired on the CBS network in 1976. It was about the immigrant experience in the United States. Land of Hope was Goldemberg's break into the television industry. Goldemberg's play Letters Home premiered as part of the Women's Project at the American Place Theatre in New York City in 1979. It dramatizes the correspondence between author Sylvia Plath and her mother. It was later staged at the Theatre at New End in London; Playbox Theatre in Melbourne; and in Paris; Copenhagen; Montreal; Tel Aviv; Los Angeles; and other cities. In 1986, French feminist film director Chantal Akerman directed it for film.

Goldemberg's Mother and Daughter: The Loving War is a TV movie first broadcast on the CBS network in 1980, which was nominated for a Writers Guild of America Best Drama Award. Goldemberg's television movie Born Beautiful was broadcast on the NBC network in 1982. The work took a critical view of the modeling industry.

Goldemberg wrote the screenplay and co-produced the television film The Burning Bed, which was originally broadcast by the NBC network in 1984. It was based on the true story of Francine Hughes, played by Farrah Fawcett, a victim of domestic violence who killed her abuser by setting their bed on fire. The movie earned very high ratings, was rebroadcast many times, and sparked public discourse about domestic violence. The screenplay won the Writers Guild of America Award for Best Dramatic Adaptation and was nominated for Emmy and Humanitas Awards.

Stone Pillow is a television movie written by Goldemberg, which originally aired on the CBS network in 1985. It starred Lucille Ball in the dramatic role of a homeless woman living on the streets of New York City. Stone Pillow ranked as one of the top 10 highest rated telecasts the week that it aired. Death at Dinner, a comedy, which aired on the PBS network in 1985, was a segment of The Booth television series written by Goldemberg.

Goldemberg's Sophie, a musical about the life of American singer and actress Sophie Tucker, was first staged at the Jewish Repertory Theater, starring Judith Cohen, in 1987. Goldemberg wrote the television movie Dark Holiday, which aired on the NBC network in 1989. It tells the true story of an American woman kidnapped in Turkey.

Goldemberg's musical Picon Pie opened in Santa Monica, CA at the Santa Monica Playhouse April 6, 2002 and starred Barbara Minkus as Molly Picon. The production toured throughout the country, appearing off-Broadway at the DR2 Theater on July 15, 2005, in New York City, moving to the Lamb's Theatre on February 17, 2005. It closed on June 2, 2005.

In 2011, Goldemberg was interviewed by NY Women in Film and Television. In the interview, Goldemberg talks about how she broke into television and shares stories about the experiences she had while working in the industry. Goldemberg's work has been archived in the New York Public Library for the Performing Arts at Lincoln Center, which houses one of the world's largest collections of materials relating to the performing arts.

== Personal life ==
Rose Leiman married Raymond Schiller in 1949; they divorced in 1968. In 1969, she married Robert Goldemberg, a chemist; they divorced in 1989. She had one son and three stepchildren.

== Death ==
Rose Leiman Goldemberg died, on July 21, 2025, aged 97. She died in Cape May, New Jersey.

== Work ==
Screenwriting

- The Burning Bed (Tisch-Avnet, NBC) Co-producer ++
- The Desiray Bartak Story (Arnold Shapiro Prod., CBS)
- The Rainbow Warrior (TNT, RG and Partner) Co-producer
- A Velvet Glove (Dave Bell Productions, ABC)
- Unnatural Acts (HBO New York)
- Dark Holiday (Orion, NBC)
- Fight for Freedom (Reader's Digest Ent., CBS)
- Stone Pillow (Schaefer/Karpf Prod., CBS) +
- Florence Nightingale (3 hrs.) (Gerald Abrams, ABC) +
- Out of Wedlock (Reader's Digest Ent., ABC)
- Death at Dinner (Schaefer/Karpf Prod., PBS)
- Victory of the Heart (Valerie Harper, TAL Prod, MGM, ABC)
- Born Beautiful (Telecom Entertainment, NBC) +
- The Jonas Salk Story (Robert Fuisz, Ent. Partners, NBC)
- Memoirs of an Ex-Prom Queen (Lorimar, CBS)
- Mother and Daughter, the Loving War (Edgar Scherick, ABC) +
- A Celebration of Women (Robert Fuisz, Ent. Partners, CBS)
- Land of Hope (Herb Brodkin, CBS) series pilot
- Growing Pains (David Susskind, CBS) series pilot
- Life in the Fast Lane (Nancy Malone, CBS) series pilot
- The Medicine Men (Herb Brodkin, Titus Prod, NBC) pilot

+ denotes award nomination, ++ denotes first-place award

Plays

- Picon Pie (musical, off Broadway, Fla, touring) ++
- Adios, Hollywood (musical, book and lyrics) John Harms Center for the Arts
- Sophie (musical, book and lyrics), Jewish Rep, NY
- Letters Home – premiered AMERICAN PLACE THEATER, NY, then London, Melbourne, Paris (with Delphine Seyrig), French tour Sweden, Norway, Holland, Poland, Scotland, tours of Scotland and Wales, Copenhagen, Istanbul, Cape Town, Budapest, Montreal, Toronto, Tel Aviv, Edinburgh Festival, Dublin Festival—and in U.S.: San Diego, Los Angeles, many tours and anthologies; Publ. Samuel French. ++
- Apples in Eden (musical book and lyrics) Kent, Ohio. ++
- Love One Another – New Dramatists, NYC.
- The Rabinowitz Gambit – Cleveland Playhouse, 18th Street Playhouse. NYC, Whole Theater Company of Montclair, N.J. ++
- The Merry War, New Dramatists, toured US. +
- Gandhiji – LA Actors Theater; Back Alley, Washington, D C ++
- Rites of Passage – Astor Place Theater. NYC, FDU Theater, NJ. ++
- Marching as to War – US tours, published by Dramatists Play Service

+ denotes award nomination, ++ denotes first-place award

Books, Articles, Short Stories

- The Way It Happened (novel, current)
- Antique Jewelry: A Practical and Passionate Guide (Crown)
- All About Jewelry (Arbor House)
- The Complete Book of Natural Cosmetics (Simon & Schuster)
- Here's Egg on Your Face (Hewitt House, Pocket Books)
- New York Times Arts Section: Woman Playwright, Man's World

== Awards and honors ==
- The Burning Bed – Writers Guild of America Award, Best Dramatic Adaptation; Emmy Nomination, Outstanding writing; American Women in Radio and Television Award; Humanitarian Award for Drama, L.A. Commission on Assaults Against Women; honored by The American Film Institute, as part of the Permanent collection.
- Stone Pillow – Religion in Media Award, Best TV Drama.
- Humanitas Prize Nominations: Stone Pillow, The Burning Bed, Born Beautiful, Mother and Daughter: The Loving War, Land of Hope.
- National Library of Poetry – Editors' Choice, Outstanding Achievement in Poetry
- Story Magazine Award – Famous Fiction Competition
- Mother and Daughter: The Loving War – Writers Guild of America Best Drama Nomination; American Women in Radio and Television Award.
- Letters Home – Best Play of The Year, L. A. Times, awards at many international festivals.
- Picon Pie — L.A. Ovation award nomination, best new musical
- Gandhiji – L.A. Times Award, chosen for O'Neill Conference; in Burns Mantle's Best Plays of 1982–1983
- The Rabinowitz Gambit – 1st Prize, Sullivan County Drama Award
- The Merry War – NJ State Council on the Arts Grant
- Fairleigh Dickinson University Grant for Women in Theater
- Voices in My Head – Earplay Purchase Award, Edwin Howard Armstrong Award for Best Radio Drama
- American Theater Wing Playwriting Scholarship Award
