= Of Mice and Men (play) =

Play by John Steinbeck

- First edition (1937)
- Original language: English
- Written by: John Steinbeck
- Genre: Tragedy drama
- Setting: An agricultural valley in Northern California

Premiere
- Date: November 23, 1937
- Place: Music Box Theatre, New York City

Of Mice and Men is a play adapted from John Steinbeck's 1937 novel of the same name. The play, which predates the Tony Awards and the Drama Desk Awards, earned the 1938 New York Drama Critics' Circle Best Play.

== Background ==
The 1937 production opened while the novel was still on best seller lists. At the time, George S. Kaufman was the top director in the country. While the play follows the novel closely, Steinbeck altered the character of Curley's Wife, perhaps in response to criticisms from friends. In the play, Curley's wife does not threaten to have Crooks lynched, and in her final scene she talks of her childhood and her father trying to run away with her. This has the effect of softening her character, portraying her as lonely and misunderstood.

== Plot ==
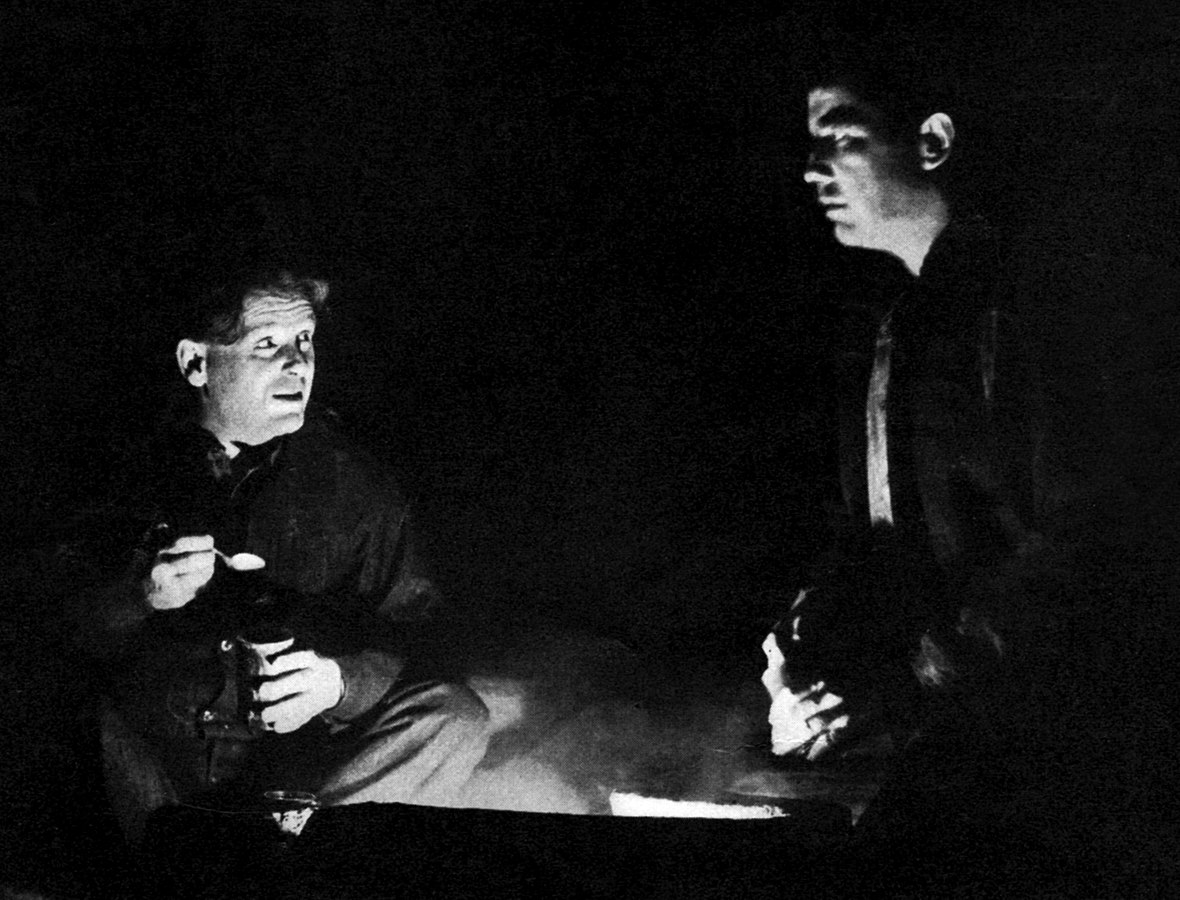
Wallace Ford and Broderick Crawford in the original Broadway production of Of Mice and Men (1938)

George, an affable migrant farm worker, and Lennie, a towering simple-minded pleasantly humble young man, are the subjects. They are bound by George's devotion and Lennie's "pathetic helplessness". George's guardianship keeps Lennie out of trouble, but we soon see this is a slippery slope. Lennie's displays of love result in several deaths ranging from mice and puppies to a beautiful woman. Eventually, in the face of a lynch mob, George kills Lennie to put him out of his misery.

== Productions ==
Steinbeck adapted the play from the novel.

The play had its world premiere circa October 1937 by the San Francisco Theatre Union. The play premiered on Broadway at the Music Box Theatre on November 23, 1937, and closed in May 1938 after 207 performances. Directed by George S. Kaufman, the cast starred Broderick Crawford as Lennie and Wallace Ford as George. In 1939 the production was moved to Los Angeles, still with Wallace Ford in the role of George, but with Lon Chaney, Jr., taking on the role of Lennie. Chaney's performance in the role resulted in his casting in the movie.

There have been several revivals, the most recent produced in 2014, directed by Anna D. Shapiro with James Franco (George), Chris O'Dowd (Lennie) and Leighton Meester (Curley's Wife).

By the Book Theatre's production won 6 Brickenden Awards including Outstanding Drama, Director, Set Design, Actor, Supporting Actor, and Lighting Design.

Theatre	Opening Date	Closing Date	Perfs.	Details
Music Box Theatre, Broadway	November 23, 1937	May 1938	207	Broadway debut
Brooks Atkinson Theatre, Broadway	December 18, 1974	February 9, 1975	61	Broadway revival
Union Square Theatre, Off-Broadway	October 7, 1987	December 6, 1987	67	Off-Broadway revival
Longacre Theatre, Broadway	April 16, 2014	July 27, 2014	118	Broadway revival

== Historical casting ==
The following tables show the casts of the principal original productions:

Role	Music Box 1937	Brooks Atkinson 1974	Union Square 1987	Longacre 2014
George Milton	Wallace Ford	Kevin Conway	John Savage	James Franco
Lennie Small	Broderick Crawford	James Earl Jones	Jay Patterson	Chris O'Dowd
Candy	John F. Hamilton	Stefan Gierasch	Edward Seamon	Jim Norton
Slim	Will Geer	David Gale	Mark Metcalf	Jim Parrack
Curley	Sam Byrd	Mark Gordon	Clifford Fetters	Alex Morf
Curley's wife	Claire Luce	Pamela Blair	Jane Fleiss	Leighton Meester
Crooks	Leigh Whipper	Joe Seneca	Roger Robinson	Ron Cephas Jones
Carlson	Charles Slattery	Pat Corley	Matthew Locricchio	Joel Marsh Garland
Whit	Walter Baldwin	James Staley	Ron Perkins	James McMenamin
The Boss	Thomas Findlay	David Clarke	Joseph Warren	Jim Ortlieb

== Awards ==
The production was chosen as Best American Play of the 1937-1938 season by the New York Drama Critics' Circle. The 2014 production earned two Tony Award nominations at the 68th Tony Awards (O'Dowd—Leading Actor and Japhy Weideman—Lighting Design).

== Reception ==
Brooks Atkinson of The New York Times wrote that "Steinbeck has caught on paper two odd and lovable farm vagrants whose fate is implicit in their characters."
