= Faith McNulty =

American writer

Faith McNulty (November 28, 1918 – April 10, 2005) was an American non-fiction author, probably best known for her 1980 literary journalism genre book The Burning Bed. She is also known for her authorship of wildlife pieces and books, including children's books.

== Biography ==
Faith Trumbull Corrigan was born in New York City, November 28, 1918. She was the daughter of a judge. She attended Barnard College for one year, then attended Rhode Island State College. But she dropped out of college once she got a job as a copy girl at the New York Daily News. She later went to work for Life magazine. She worked for the United States Office of War Information in London during World War II.

McNulty was a staff writer at The New Yorker magazine from 1953 to 1994. In 1980, a collection of her New Yorker work was published as The Wildlife Stories of Faith McNulty. For many years, she edited the annual New Yorker compilation of the year's best children's books.

She also frequently wrote children's books on wildlife, including How to Dig a Hole to the Other Side of the World in 1979 and When I Lived With Bats in 1998. Her 1966 book The Whooping Crane: The Bird that Defies Distinction was written for adults.

Her husband, John McNulty, was also a writer for The New Yorker. Alongside Tom Wolfe, Truman Capote, Gay Talese and James Baldwin, he contributed to the development of the literary genre of Creative nonfiction, which is also known as literary journalism or literature in fact. Influenced by her time at The New Yorker under the editorship of Harold Ross, her own major nonfiction work, The Burning Bed, is an example of this evolving genre, which Wolfe labeled “New Journalism”. After McNulty's death in 1956, She married Richard Martin, a set and prop designer.

The Burning Bed was based on the true story of Francine Hughes, who set fire to the bedroom in which her husband was sleeping. Hughes defended herself by saying that her husband had been abusing her for 13 years. The jury at her trial ruled that she had been temporarily insane, and she was found not guilty.

Faith had fonder memories of life with kinder family, however. "I can remember my father in his nightshirt, digging for worms for the baby robin in the bathroom. That's the kind of household it was; I had woodchucks in the bathroom, cats, squirrels, chipmunks", McNulty once said.

Towards the end of her life, she wrote a weekly column for The Providence Journal on a local animal shelter run by the Animal Welfare League. Her mother had founded the Animal Welfare League in southern Rhode Island. McNulty had long been known for taking in stray animals at her farm.

She suffered a stroke in 2004. She died at her farm in Wakefield, Rhode Island.

McNulty's last book was illustrated by Steven Kellogg and published by Scholastic Books in 2005, If You Decide to Go to the Moon—a picture book written in the second person. The next year, it won a major "year's best" children's literary award, the Boston Globe–Horn Book Award for Nonfiction.

== Selected works ==
- How to Dig a Hole to the Other Side of the World
- Dancing with Manatees
- The Burning Bed
- ''The Wildlife Stories of Faith McNulty
- Peeping in the Shell: A Whooping Crane Is Hatched
- Arty The Smarty
- Why Must They Die? The strange case of the prairie dog and the black-footed ferret
- Whales: Their Life in the Sea
- Listening to Whales Sing
- How Whales Walked into the Sea
- The Elephant Who Couldn't Forget
- Endangered Animals
- The Great Whales
- Hurricane
- If Dogs Ruled the World
- The Lady and the Spider
- Mouse and Tim
- Orphan: The Story of a Baby Woodchuck
- Playing With Dolphins
- Red Wolves
- The Silly Story of a Flea and His Dog
- A Snake in the House
- With Love from Koko
- Woodchuck
- If You Decide to Go to the Moon, illustrated by Steven Kellogg (Scholastic, 2005)
