= Broadway Damage =

- Directed by: Victor Mignatti
- Written by: Victor Mignatti
- Produced by: David Topel
- Starring: Mara Hobel; Michael Lucas; Hugh Panaro; Aaron Williams
- Cinematography: Michael Mayers
- Edited by: Victor Mignatti
- Music by: Elliot Sokolov
- Distributed by: Jour de Fête Films; Wolfe Video
- Release date: August 26, 1997
- Running time: 110 minutes
- Country: United States
- Language: English

Broadway Damage is a 1997 gay-themed romantic comedy-drama directed by Victor Mignatti and starring Mara Hobel, Michael Lucas, Hugh Panaro and Aaron Williams. The sound editor was Rick Dior, who won an Oscar for Best Sound for the film Apollo 13. It was filmed in Greenwich Village.

== Plot ==
Cynthia (Hobel), Marc (Lucas) and Robert (Williams) are young friends in New York City and recent New York University graduates. Marc is a struggling actor, Robert is an actor/songwriter and Cynthia is desperately trying to attract the attention of Tina Brown to break into magazine publishing. Cynthia and Marc find an apartment together in Greenwich Village. Robert is secretly in love with Marc, who's oblivious.

Marc falls into a relationship with David (Panaro), an aspiring musician who lives with his boyfriend across the alley from Marc's apartment. David's boyfriend throws him out and David moves in with Marc.

Robert, trying to get over Marc, becomes interested in a man who works in a local card and gift shop (Marc and Robert refer to him as "Zola"). Taking Marc's advice to "make the grand gesture," he sends Cynthia in with a gift from him as a secret admirer. "Zola" turns down the gesture, and Robert is humiliated.

Marc and Robert discover that David supports himself as a hustler and Marc breaks up with him and throws him out. Robert makes "the grand gesture" for Marc by singing a song he's written for him. Before Marc can respond, Cynthia, whose attempts to get through to Tina Brown have become increasingly bizarre, has a nervous breakdown. She returns to her parents' home on Long Island.

In the end, Marc and Robert visit Cynthia on Long Island. Free from the drama of his relationship with David, Marc realizes that he has feelings for Robert. Cynthia gets a call from Tina Brown's assistant, setting up a meeting for the following day.

== Cast ==
- Mara Hobel as Cynthia
- Michael Lucas (credited as Michael Shawn Lucas) as Marc
- Hugh Panaro as David
- Aaron Williams as Robert
- Alan Filderman as Casting Director
- Gary Janetti as Zola
- Celeste Lecesne (Note: Credited as James Lecesne.) as Cruise Ship Actor
- Benim Foster as The Super
- Jean Loup as Punk
- Gerry McIntyre as Jerry
- Tyagi Schwartz as Carl
- Barbara Winters Pinto (credited as Barbara Winters-Pinto) as Temp Agent
- Sammy as himself (Mouse)
- Jonathan Walker as Chuck
- Richard M. Davidson (credited as Richard Davidson) as The John

== Reception ==
=== Critical response ===
On Rotten Tomatoes the film has an approval rating of 29% based on reviews from 7 critics.

David Noh from the Film Journal International said on 4 January 2007, "Has got to represent yet another low for the gay indie, New York Style". Michael Dequina from TheMovieReport.com said on 1 January 2000, "The terrible trio whine their way to a happy ending that is wholly undeserved". Dennis Harvey of Variety called the film "an anachronistic throwback" and "Lacking any hip edge or writing wit, pleasant but bland". Lawrence Van Gelder of The New York Times said it was a "labored and insufferably cute film". Jan Stuart of The Advocate magazine wrote a large negative review, stating it "trivializes their struggle in a cuddly wash of sitcom music and laugh track-less chatter, smelling suspiciously of Hollywood damage".

=== Accolades ===
- Austin Gay & Lesbian International Film Festival Mission Award - Victor Mignatti (winner)
- L.A. Outfest Audience Award for Outstanding Narrative Feature (winner)
- Verzaubert International Gay & Lesbian Film Festival Rosebud Award for Best Film (nominated)

== Home media ==
Broadway Damage was released on Region 1 DVD on 30 November 1999.
