= Rick Dior =

American sound engineer

Richard Dior
- Born: Richard Dior; April 9, 1947
- Died: October 26, 1998 (aged 51); Marlboro, New Jersey, U.S.
- Occupation: Sound engineer
- Years active: 1970–1998

Richard Dior (April 9, 1947 – October 26, 1998) was an American sound engineer. He won an Oscar for Best Sound for the film Apollo 13. He worked on more than 80 films between 1970 and 1998. He died in Marlboro, New Jersey from heart failure.

== Selected filmography ==
- Dirty Dancing (1987)
- The Accused (1988)
- Bob Roberts (1992)
- The Pelican Brief (1993)
- Dead Man Walking (1994)
- Apollo 13 (1995)
- Ransom (1996)
- Broadway Damage (1997)
