= Moose Murders =

1983 Broadway play which was a notorious flop

- Original language: English
- Written by: Arthur Bicknell
- Genre: Mystery farce

Premiere
- Date: February 22, 1983
- Place: United States

Moose Murders is a play by Arthur Bicknell, self-described as a mystery farce. A notorious flop, it is now widely considered the standard of awfulness against which all Broadway failures are judged, and its name has become synonymous with those distinctively bad Broadway plays that open and close on the same night. It had its single performance (excluding its 13 previews) at the Eugene O'Neill Theatre on February 22, 1983.

== Plot ==
The Holloway family arrives at the "Wild Moose Lodge", which they have recently purchased, in the Adirondack Mountains, and they become trapped due to a storm. They pass the time playing a murder mystery game along with other people at the lodge: failed entertainers Snooks & Howie, and Nurse Dagmar who cares for patriarch Sidney Holloway. During the night, one Holloway son attempts incest with his mother. Several murders take place. According to reviewers, a mummified paraplegic (most likely Sidney) rises from his wheelchair to kick a man dressed as a moose in the crotch. However, this scene does not appear in the original script.

== Original production ==
The original Broadway production at the Eugene O'Neill Theatre was marred by problems even before it opened. Eve Arden in the lead role was seeking a return to Broadway after 40 years, but dropped out after the second preview. This was said to be due to "artistic differences"—but another source has suggested that it was because she could not remember her lines. She was replaced by Holland Taylor. The complete cast was as follows:

- Snooks Keene – June Gable
- Howie Keene – Don Potter
- Joe Buffalo Dance – Jack Dabdoub
- Nurse Dagmar – Lisa McMillan
- Hedda Holloway – Holland Taylor
- Stinky Holloway – Scott Evans
- Gay Holloway – Mara Hobel
- Lauraine Holloway Fay – Lillie Robertson
- Nelson Fay – Nicholas Hormann
- Sidney Holloway – Dennis Florzak

The production was directed by John Roach.

== Reception ==
Moose Murders is legendary among flops on Broadway. The New York Times theater critic Frank Rich commented in his review of the play that there would now "always be two groups of theatergoers in this world: those who have seen Moose Murders, and those who have not ... A visit to Moose Murders is what will separate the connoisseurs of Broadway disaster from mere dilettantes for many moons to come." He later described it as "the worst play I've ever seen on a Broadway stage". Rich's original review stated that "Even Act One of Moose Murders is inadequate preparation for Act Two," and that "I won't soon forget the spectacle of watching the mummified Sidney rise from his wheelchair to kick an intruder, unaccountably dressed in a moose costume, in the groin." In an end-of-season review, he described Moose Murders as "the season's most stupefying flop—a show so preposterous that it made minor celebrities out of everyone who witnessed it, whether from on stage or in the audience."

The New Yorker art critic Brendan Gill said the play "would insult the intelligence of an audience consisting entirely of amoebas". Critic John Simon wrote in a review of the play, "Selective patrons cannot even imagine what horrors reviewers are exposed to, night after nightmarish night." Associated Press drama critic Jay Sharbutt described the play as comprising "a lot of labored skulduggery, frantic slapstick, dashes upstairs, downstairs and sideways, assorted gunshots and half the population of this caper dispatched to a better world, if not better play" and declined to identify the cast "pending notification of [next of] kin". Douglas Watt of the New York Daily News called it an "incredibly sappy murder mystery farce" that shouldn't happen to a moose and said that he had forgotten how it ended, while the New York Post's Clive Barnes said that it was "so indescribably bad that I do not intend to waste anyone's time by describing it." He commended Eve Arden for leaving it before it opened and commented, "Some people have all the luck." Arthur Bicknell has also said that a member of the public, on spotting him in the street, shouted 'Officer, arrest that show!'

Moose Murders became a touchstone of reference to be used in other reviews; a 1998 review of the television sitcom Encore! Encore! described the show as "the 'Moose Murders' of sitcoms—it won't be here past Halloween, but the recollection of its awfulness will give you untold delight for years to come." A 1995 production of the play Dracula in Philadelphia has been described as having "taken on legendary-turkey status [among Philadelphia critics] on a par with Moose Murders". Frank Rich himself later wrote in The New York Times (reviewing the 1988 version of Carrie), "Only the absence of antlers separates the pig murders of Carrie from the Moose Murders of Broadway lore." In the 2014 Broadway revival of Terrence McNally's It's Only a Play, the Moose Murders' failure is inevitably brought up during the post-premiere hand-wringing.

== Revivals ==
Despite (or perhaps because of) the play's reputation, it has occasionally been revived. Numerous community theatre groups have staged it and, in 2008, John Borek, a Rochester "part-time conceptual artist", began holding staged readings of the play, hoping that it will find a new life "as a work of art". Borek's production led to articles in major newspapers such as The New York Times and Spain's El País. Borek's group staged another reading in 2010, and also staged readings of an earlier Bicknell play called My Great Dead Sister (which Bicknell said had received "good reviews") as well as a new play, What Is Art?, that Bicknell wrote for Borek. New York City's Beautiful Soup Theater Collective revived the play in January 2013 for a two-week run at the Connelly Theatre. The production was directed by Steven Carl McCasland.

== See also ==
- List of the shortest-running Broadway shows
