= Mara Hobel =

American actress

- Born: 1971 or 1972 (age 54–55)
- Years active: 1979–present

Mara Hobel (born 1971 or 1972) is an American actress. She is best known for her portrayal of young Christina Crawford in the film Mommie Dearest, for which she received two Razzie nominations for Worst Supporting Actress and Worst New Star. She also portrayed the crazed tap-dancing daughter Gay in the legendary Broadway bomb, Moose Murders, which opened and closed on the same night in 1983.

== Early years ==
Hobel graduated from Walter Panas High School and the American Academy of Dramatic Arts. She first auditioned for roles when she was 5 years old.

== Career ==
Hobel played the recurring character Charlotte Tilden for one season on the television series Roseanne from 1992 to 1993. Her film work includes Personal Velocity: Three Portraits and Broadway Damage. In 2019, she appeared on the television series Blue Bloods.

Hobel currently teaches acting classes for children at Rising Star Productions.

== Filmography ==
- Mommie Dearest (1981) – Christina Crawford – nominated for Golden Raspberry Award for Worst Supporting Actress
- The Hand (1981) – Lizzie
- Broadway Damage (1997) – Cynthia
- Claire Makes It Big (1999) – Claire
- Personal Velocity (2002) – Fay
- Kinsey (2004) – Student #2
- The Happening (2008) – Woman with Hands Over Ears

== Television ==
- Sorrows of Gin (1979) – Amy
- Family of Strangers (1980, 1 episode) – Roseanne
- CBS Children's Mystery Theatre (1983, 1 episode) – Theodora
- The Get Along Gang (1984) – Dotty Dog (voice)
- Doing Life (1986, 1 episode) – Rachel Rosenberg
- Law & Order (1992, 1 episode) – Ellen
- Summer Stories (1992, 3 episodes) – Sarah
- Roseanne (1992–1993, 5 episodes) – Charlotte Tilden
- My So-Called Life (1994, 1 episode)
- Third Watch (2002, 1 episode) – Margo
- The Jury (2004, 1 episode) – Marianne Zancanaro
- Law & Order: Criminal Intent (2004, 1 episode) – April Callaway

== Theater ==
- In My Father's Eyes
- Moose Murders
- Rude Times

== Training ==
- Drama: The American Academy of Dramatic Arts, NY
- Voice: The Voice Workshop, Liz Sabine and Louis David, NY and CA
- Dance: Phil Black and Studio II, NY
