= Legends of the Superheroes =

Television specials of DC comic book characters

- Directed by: Bill Carruthers; Chris Darley
- Narrated by: Gary Owens
- Composer: Fred Werner
- Country of origin: United States
- Original language: English
- No. of episodes: 2

Production
- Executive producer: Joseph Barbera
- Producer: Bill Carruthers
- Cinematography: Greg Brunton
- Editors: Harvey Berger; Andy Shubert
- Running time: 100 minutes
- Production companies: Hanna-Barbera Productions; DC Comics

Original release
- Network: NBC
- Release: January 18 – January 25, 1979

Related
- Super Friends

Legends of the Superheroes is an umbrella title for two 60-minute live-action television specials produced by Hanna-Barbera Productions that aired on NBC on January 18 and 25, 1979. The series was loosely based on Hanna-Barbera's Super Friends animated series, then airing on Saturday mornings on ABC; it served as a reunion of sorts for the 1960s' Batman TV series, as it brings back together three of its stars reprising their respective roles. The specials were produced like standard variety shows of the time: on videotape and with a laugh track.

== Cast ==
Legends of the Superheroes stars Adam West and Burt Ward, reprising their roles as Batman and Robin. The show also has a large ensemble cast that includes Garrett Craig as Captain Marvel, Howard Murphy as Green Lantern, Rod Haase as Flash, Bill Nuckols as Hawkman, Barbara Joyce as Huntress, Alfie Wise as Atom, and Danuta Wesley as Black Canary. This was the first live-action appearance for Green Lantern, the Flash, Hawkman, Huntress, the Atom, and Black Canary, as well as all of the villains who originated in comic books, except for the Riddler.

=== Cast ===
In both specials, except as noted:

- Adam West as Batman
- Burt Ward as Robin
- William Schallert as Scarlet Cyclone
- Mickey Morton as Solomon Grundy
- Jeff Altman as Weather Wizard
- Charlie Callas as Sinestro
- Howard Murphy as Green Lantern
- Aleshia Brevard as Giganta
- Garrett Craig as Captain Marvel
- Howard Morris as Doctor Sivana
- Danuta Wesley as Black Canary
- Bill Nuckols as Hawkman
- Rod Haase as The Flash
- Gabriel Dell as Mordru
- Barbara Joyce as Huntress
- Frank Gorshin as Riddler (1st special)
- Ruth Buzzi as Aunt Minerva (2nd special)
- Ed McMahon as Himself (2nd special)
- Alfie Wise as Atom (2nd special)
- June Gable as Rhoda Rooter (2nd special)
- Pat Carroll as Esther Hol (2nd special)
- Brad Sanders as Ghetto Man (2nd special)
- Gary Owens as Narrator (uncredited)
- Marsha Warfield as Woman in Phone Booth (uncredited, 1st special)

== Episodes ==
=== The Challenge ===
In the first special, the Justice League of America (Batman, Robin, The Flash, Green Lantern, Hawkman, Captain Marvel, Huntress, and Black Canary) unite at the Hall of Heroes to celebrate Scarlet Cyclone's birthday. The party is interrupted by the Legion of Doom (Riddler, Weather Wizard, Sinestro, Mordru, Doctor Sivana, Giganta, and Solomon Grundy), who announce they have hidden a deadly bomb in a secret location, and the heroes must follow clues to find it. It's all actually a ruse to trick the heroes into drinking Sivana's de-powering potion. Despite the fact that they now lack powers, the heroes fight the villains and manage to both disarm the bomb and recover their powers. Only after the whole battle is over, and the heroes have proven victorious, does Scarlet Cyclone arrive to give his aid.

=== The Roast ===
The second special is a celebrity roast of the superheroes hosted by Ed McMahon. All of the major characters from the first episode return, except the Riddler. New characters featured include Ghetto Man, an African-American superhero who performs a stand-up comedy routine; Aunt Minerva, an enemy of Captain Marvel who seeks a sixth husband from among the male superheroes; Rhoda Rooter, an entertainment reporter who snags an exclusive interview with Giganta and the Atom; and Esther Hol, Hawkman's mother.

== Home media ==
Warner Home Video's Warner Archive Collection released the specials on DVD on October 19, 2010.
