= Picon Pie =

Musical play about Molly Picon

- Original language: English
- Written by: Rose Leiman Goldemberg
- Characters: Molly Picon; Jacob "Yonkel" Kalich
- Subject: The life and career of Molly Picon
- Genre: Musical play

Premiere
- Date: April 6, 2002
- Place: Santa Monica Playhouse, Santa Monica, California, U.S.
- Directed by: Chris DeCarlo

Picon Pie is a musical play by Rose Leiman Goldemberg about the life and career of Molly Picon, a performer associated with Yiddish theatre, Broadway, film, radio, and television. The play premiered at the Santa Monica Playhouse in California on April 6, 2002, with Barbara Minkus as Picon and Jack Kutcher as her husband and manager, Jacob "Yonkel" Kalich. The production was directed by Chris DeCarlo, with musical direction by Beth Ertz.

Minkus later reprised the role in a 2003 Florida production and in the play's 2004 Off-Broadway production in New York City. The New York production opened at the DR2 Theatre on July 15, 2004, and later transferred to the Lamb's Theatre, where June Gable succeeded Minkus in the role of Picon.

== Background ==
Picon Pie dramatizes episodes from the life and career of Molly Picon. The play follows Picon from her childhood performances through her work in Yiddish theatre, vaudeville, Broadway, and film. It also depicts her marriage and professional partnership with Jacob "Yonkel" Kalich.

The production incorporates songs associated with Picon and the Yiddish stage. In the original Santa Monica production, the musical selections functioned as part of the narrative rather than as separate concert numbers.

Among the subjects addressed in the play are Picon's childhood career, her marriage to Kalich, financial difficulties during the Depression, the stillbirth of the couple's daughter, Picon's performances for displaced persons after World War II, and Kalich's death in 1975.

== Production history ==
=== Santa Monica, 2002 ===
Picon Pie premiered at the Santa Monica Playhouse in Santa Monica, California, on April 6, 2002. The production was presented in association with Dianne Baroni and was directed by Chris DeCarlo. Barbara Minkus played Molly Picon, and Jack Kutcher played Picon's father and her husband, Jacob "Yonkel" Kalich. Beth Ertz served as musical director and pianist, with John Setar and Jesse Liptrap performing woodwinds.

The production had sets by the Attic Room, lighting by James Cooper, and costumes by Ashley Hayes. It opened on April 6, was reviewed by Variety on April 14 and the Los Angeles Times on May 31, and was scheduled to run through September 1, 2002.

The production was later nominated for a Theatre L.A. Ovation Award in the World Premiere Musical category.

=== Florida, 2003 ===
In 2003, Picon Pie was produced at the Hollywood Playhouse in Hollywood, Florida, with Minkus continuing in the role of Picon. Reviewing the production for the South Florida Sun-Sentinel, Bill Hirschman noted that Minkus had developed the role during a ten-month run in Santa Monica.

The Florida production continued the two-character format and used Picon's career and personal life as the basis for its narrative. Hirschman described the work as a musical biography centered on Minkus's portrayal of Picon.

=== Off-Broadway, 2004–2005 ===
Picon Pie opened Off-Broadway at the DR2 Theatre in New York City on July 15, 2004, with Barbara Minkus as Molly Picon and Stuart Zagnit as Jacob "Yonkel" Kalich. The New York production was directed by Pamela Hall, with musical direction by Carl Danielsen. Matthew Maraffi designed the set, Laura Frecon designed the costumes, and Heather Layman designed the lighting. Danielsen performed on piano and Margot Leverett played clarinet.

The production later transferred to the Lamb's Theatre in 2005. June Gable replaced Minkus in the role of Picon, while Zagnit continued as Kalich. The understudy for Molly was Carolyn Seiff, and the understudy for Yonkel was Stuart Marshall. The Lamb's Theatre engagement began previews in February 2005 and closed on June 2, 2005.

== Cast ==
=== Santa Monica, 2002 ===
- Barbara Minkus as Molly Picon
- Jack Kutcher as Jacob "Yonkel" Kalich and Picon's father

=== Florida, 2003 ===
- Barbara Minkus as Molly Picon

=== Off-Broadway, 2004 ===
- Barbara Minkus as Molly Picon
- Stuart Zagnit as Jacob "Yonkel" Kalich

=== Lamb's Theatre, 2005 ===
- June Gable as Molly Picon
- Stuart Zagnit as Jacob "Yonkel" Kalich

== Reception ==
Reviewing the original Santa Monica production for Variety, Julio Martinez praised Minkus's portrayal of Picon, noting her resemblance to Picon and her ability to convey both humor and hardship.

Reviewing the Santa Monica production for the Los Angeles Times, F. Kathleen Foley praised Minkus's performance and singing. She found the play loosely structured but said its strongest scenes linked Picon's life to the history of Yiddish theater and showed Minkus's range from comedy to grief.

The Santa Monica production received a Theatre L.A. Ovation Award nomination in the World Premiere Musical category.

In his 2003 review for the South Florida Sun-Sentinel, Bill Hirschman praised Minkus's performance as Picon and called it the production's main strength. He also noted that she had developed the role during the earlier Santa Monica run.

Reviewing the 2004 Off-Broadway production for CurtainUp, Les Gutman highlighted the performances of Minkus and Zagnit, as well as Minkus's singing. However, he criticized aspects of Goldemberg's script and noted that the musical portions were more effective than some of the biographical material.

In another review of the 2004 Off-Broadway production, Lawrence Van Gelder in The New York Times described Picon Pie as a nostalgic account of Picon's life and career, combining biographical narration with songs from the Yiddish theatrical tradition. Van Gelder found the production evocative of an earlier era but criticized its limited emotional impact and described Minkus's characterization of Picon as lacking depth.

In a 2005 article on a production of Picon Pie at the Bendheim Performing Arts Center in Scarsdale, New York, Jennifer Medina of The New York Times discussed the play as both a biography of Picon and an introduction to Yiddish theater for audiences with little knowledge of that tradition. The production starred June Gable as Picon and included audience participation in several Yiddish songs.
