= Brenda Starr (1989 film) =

1989 film directed by Robert Ellis Miller

- International theatrical release poster
- Directed by: Robert Ellis Miller
- Screenplay by: Noreen Stone &; James D. Buchanan; Jenny Wolkind (aka Delia Ephron)
- Story by: Noreen Stone &; James D. Buchanan
- Based on: Characters by Dale Messick
- Produced by: Myron A. Hyman
- Starring: Brooke Shields; Diana Scarwid; Jeffrey Tambor; June Gable; Charles Durning; Tony Peck; Timothy Dalton
- Cinematography: Freddie Francis
- Edited by: Mark Melnick
- Music by: Johnny Mandel
- Distributed by: Triumph Releasing Corporation
- Release dates: May 15, 1989 (France); April 15, 1992 (U.S.)
- Running time: 93 minutes
- Country: United States
- Language: English
- Budget: $16 million
- Box office: $67,878

Brenda Starr is a 1989 American adventure film directed by Robert Ellis Miller based on Dale Messick's comic strip Brenda Starr, Reporter. It stars Brooke Shields, Timothy Dalton, and Jeffrey Tambor.

The film was shot in 1986; however, it was not released for three years because of lengthy litigation over distribution rights. It finally was released in some international markets in 1989 and in America in 1992.

== Plot ==
Mike is a struggling artist who draws the Brenda Starr comic strip for a newspaper. When Brenda comes to life and sees how unappreciated she is by Mike, she leaves the comic. To return her to her rightful place and keep his job, Mike draws himself into the strip.

Within her fictional world, Brenda Starr is an ace reporter for the New York Flash. She is talented, fearless, and smart, and she is a very snappy dresser. The only competition she has is from Libby Lipscomb, the rival newspaper's top reporter.

Brenda heads to the Amazon jungle to find a scientist with a secret formula, which will create cheap and powerful fuel from ordinary water. There, she must steal the formula from her competition and foreign spies.

== Cast ==
- Brooke Shields as Brenda Starr
- Timothy Dalton as Basil St. John
- Tony Peck as Mike Randall
- Diana Scarwid as Libby "Lips" Lipscomb
- Nestor Serrano as Jose
- Jeffrey Tambor as Vladimir
- June Gable as Luba
- Charles Durning as Francis I. Livright
- Kathleen Wilhoite as Hank O'Hare
- John Short as "Pesky" Miller
- Eddie Albert as Police Chief Maloney
- Mark von Holstein as Donovan O'Shea
- Henry Gibson as Professor Gerhardt Von Kreutzer
- Ed Nelson as President Harry S. Truman
- Tom Aldredge as the fake Captain Borg
- Matthew Cowles as the real Captain Borg
- Sergio Pereira as a young Portuguese taxi driver
- Antoni Corone as Karl

== Development ==
In 1981, it was reported that Deborah Harry would star in a film version of the comic with George Hamilton as Basil St. John. In 1984, a small production company called Tomorrow Entertainment, under Myron Hyman, got the rights to make a movie about Brenda Starr. The idea was to make a low-budget film that could be a high-quality television movie. Tomorrow hired James Buchanan and Noreen Stone to write a script.

Hyman says he began getting calls from Teri Shields, mother of Brooke. "She said Brooke always wanted to be Brenda Starr," said Hyman. "I guess Brenda was something of a role model to Brooke when she was a little girl. Well, Brooke's a lovely girl and I said of course we'd consider her." Eventually, Teri told Hyman that she also had an investor who wanted to put money into the film. This was Sheik Abdul Aziz al Ibrahim, a brother-in-law of Saudi King Fahd. He offered to cover the budget for the film on three conditions:

- Brooke Shields played Brenda Starr
- the film had to be a first-class production made for theaters, not television
- no advance distribution deal was negotiated.

Hyman agreed. Ibrahim's representatives created Mystery Man Productions, a New York-based company, to finance the film. Buchanan and Stone eventually were called to the offices of Mystery Man Productions. "They were not people who had ever made a movie," Buchanan said of the representatives. "They said things like, 'On page 22, you will introduce a dream sequence.' That kind of thing."

Finance came through the Bank of Credit and Commerce International. The Ibrahim family was among the bank's largest depositors. Mystery Man hired Robert Ellis Miller to direct, and Bob Mackie designed Shields' dresses. Delia Ephron came in to rewrite the movie. She subsequently removed her name from the film's credits, using the pseudonym "Jenny Wolkind" instead. Mystery Man obtained limited rights to the Brenda Starr character from the Tribune Entertainment Co., owners of the comic strip, in April 1986. But the company failed to obtain television rights, something that proved crucial later.

== Production ==
Filming started July 1986. Shields filmed it over her summer break from Princeton, where she was studying. The film was shot near Jacksonville, Florida, and in Puerto Rico. The budget was originally $15 million.

During filming, Timothy Dalton, who had the male lead, was cast as James Bond for The Living Daylights.

Initial spending on the film was from the Ibrahim cash accounts at the BCCI, but midway through the project, Ibrahim began to have second thoughts about the production costs. The film ended up being financed half cash and half in loans from the BCCI.

Brooke Shields later recalled she "loved" making the film:

I was so thrilled that it was happening. I think in hindsight the problem was that it was never backed by a studio. It was (Menahem) Golan and (Yoram) Globus, and it was all sort of fishy to begin with. We also were the first of that kind of comic-book movie, and unfortunately it took seven years to get released, by which point Batman and Dick Tracy and every other superhero and cartoon-inspired movie had already come. We were originally going to be part of that first batch. I always thought it was unfortunate, because the idea and the cast were both so good. Timothy Dalton! But the direction fell short, and it got legally tied up, so to me it was such a shame. I think that movie could've been... It was really fun, and I thought it was unique. And I loved playing that character. She's still one of my favorites.

Director Miller said he spent about $15 million to make the movie. Producer Hyman said the budget was about $14 million. Ibrahim associates said an internal audit attributed $22.3 million to the film.

During filming two cinematographers were fired and Timothy Dalton asked Freddie Francis, with whom he was friendly, to take over.

== Release issues ==
The film was meant to be released in 1987. "It would have been a hot thing," Miller said. "(Brooke's star) was in the ascendancy. She was 21, just graduating from college and gorgeous."

By May 1987, Phil Isaacs and Hyman, representing Mystery Man, started distribution negotiations with New World Pictures, whose executive Bob Cheren later testified that Hyman said "all rights" to the film were available and a deal was arranged. New World wanted to cash in on the fact that Dalton had been cast as James Bond and the impending surge in comic-book movies such as Batman and Dick Tracy. The film was meant to open theatrically in January 1988.

However, Ibrahim later decided he wanted a new deal. "They (the Ibrahim people) just didn't understand the movie business," Hyman said. "They looked at it like real estate or something." One of Ibrahim's representatives said their client was "prepared to keep the film on a shelf and watch it in the desert on Saturday nights" if he could not have the kind of distribution deal he wanted. Mystery Man kept the film's negative locked up, claiming New World had not signed a contract.

New World then discovered that Tribune, the company that owned the comic, claimed to hold all television rights to Brenda Starr. This meant they could not make money on a TV sale. On July 10, 1987, Tribune notified New World that the distribution deal was "unacceptable". Mystery Man pulled out of the deal. In September, New World sued Tomorrow, Mystery Man and the film's sales agents, claiming fraud, breach of contract and civil conspiracy. Mystery Man sought to block New World from distributing the film.

In December 1987, Shields' mother Teri said: "I feel the film's not ready to be released. They need about $60,000 more to re-edit." She was also unhappy with the billing. "Brooke's name is not on top and it's supposed to be. That's in our contract."

New World sold the film to Zambia, Japan, Belgium, Colombia, Norway and Swaziland. In February 1989, New World was bought by Pathe Communications for $189 million. However, this deal fell apart, and Ronald Perelman's Andrews Group instead purchased New World that April, indicating that while New World's television operations would continue, their motion pictures and home video operations would be cut back significantly.

AM-PM Productions bought rights to Brenda Starr in January 1990. "We saw the picture as definitely a Cinderella story," said a representative. "It's sweet, cute, adorable and charming. These are not words Hollywood likes to use."

AM-PM cut the running time from 108 minutes to 96 minutes. A new release date was set for North America: June 7, 1991. Triumph Releasing (a division of Columbia Pictures) would distribute. By August of that year, the film had been shown in Zambia, Norway and Colombia but not North America. "I hope it does come out because there's no point in keeping it hidden," said Dalton. "It's probably the best work (Brooke's) ever done." "I like the film," said Miller. "I'm very pleased."

== Reception ==
=== Box office ===
When the film was released in the United States in 1992, it bombed at the box office, making $30,000 in its first week. Negative reviews were blamed, and the film was pulled from theaters shortly after its theatrical distribution.

=== Critical response ===
Brenda Starr received scathing reviews. Owen Gleiberman, writing for Entertainment Weekly, graded the film with an F, stating that the title character "... comes off as a giggly (if spectacularly elongated) high school princess" and that the film "is so flaccid and cheap-looking, so ineptly pieced together, that it verges on the avant-garde. I suspect they won't even like it in France." Entertainment Weekly would later place the film on its list of "21 Worst Comic-Book Movies Ever".

Peter Travers, writing for Rolling Stone, gave the film an equally negative review, writing, "There's been so much negative insider buzz about Brooke's 'Brenda' that you might be harboring a hope that the damned thing turned out all right. Get over it. Brenda Starr is not as bad as the also-rans that Hollywood traditionally dumps on us before Labor Day... it's a heap worse."

Janet Maslin, in The New York Times, commented, "This would-be comic romp is badly dated in several conspicuous ways. Its cold war villains are embarrassingly outré (even allowing for the film's 1940's look, in keeping with the peak popularity of Brenda Starr as a comic strip heroine)...most dated of all is Brenda herself, the 'girl reporter' who worries chiefly about not running her stockings or breaking her high heels, and who in one scene actually uses a black patent leather handbag as a secret weapon."

Pamela Bruce, in The Austin Chronicle, was highly critical of Brenda Starr: "After gathering dust for five years, some studio executive decided that there just isn't enough dreck in the world and decided to unleash Brenda Starr upon us poor, unsuspecting mortals."

== Home video ==
The film was released on both VHS and DVD formats.

The DVD version is available for purchase in two variations; one for all regions and another for region 2. The film is presented in full frame, 1.33:1 format, with English Dolby Digital stereo sound.

The title was also made available for streaming in the digital format.
