= Mission Odyssey =

2002 French-German television series

- Genre: Adventure; Fantasy
- Based on: Homer's Odyssey
- Developed by: Marie Louz Drouet; Bruno Regestre; Claude Scasso
- Voices of: Colleen Clinkenbeard; Dan Green; Marc Thompson; Jason Griffith; James Carter Cathcart; Darren Dunstan; Stuart Zagnit; Alison Viktorin; Liza Jacqueline
- Composer: Kia Productions
- Countries of origin: France; Germany
- Original languages: French; German
- No. of seasons: 1
- No. of episodes: 26

Production
- Executive producers: Vincent Chalvon-Demersay; David Michel; Dr. Carl Woebcken; Rainer Soehnlein
- Producer: Michael Lessa
- Running time: 23 minutes
- Production companies: BAF Berlin Animation Film; Marathon Filmproduction; Marathon Animation

Original release
- Network: M6
- Release: September 6, 2002 – 2003

Mission Odyssey is an animated television series about the adventures of the ancient Greek hero Ulysses.

== Plot ==
After 10 years of war, Ulysses and the Greek allies besieged Troy without success. But after Ulysses invents the Trojan Horse, it tricks the Trojans and ends the war in the Greeks' favor. Poseidon makes a bet with Athena that Ulysses and his crew will never make it home on their own. To achieve this, Poseidon interferes in every episode of the series by hiring powerful individuals to threaten Ulysses, while Athena constantly reminds the lord of the ocean that direct intervention violates their rules.

The series covers the most important stages of Homer's Odyssey, but is simplified and re-worked in a child-friendly manner. Occasionally characters from other Greek legends are used.

== Characters ==
=== Main characters ===
- Ulysses (voiced by Dan Green): As Ithaca's famous hero and ruler, he left 10 years ago to help the Greeks in the Trojan War which they won thanks to his tricks. He plans to return home, rule his kingdom, and reunite with his loving family, but did not count on Poseidon to delay his adventure, because the latter is determined to never lose his bet against Athena.
- Nisa (voiced by Liza Jacqueline): A 13-year-old girl and the youngest of the crew, who stows away aboard Ulysses's ship in Troy (though her roots may lie elsewhere), and one of Ulysses' loyal comrades. She has the ability to have horrific visions of imminent doom, but the other members of the crew little heed her when she tells them, partially because she is a little girl (in a similar way to Cassandra of myth). It takes a while for her companions to trust her and believe in her visions. She was sent by Athena to join Ulysses’s crew due to her Owl accidentally bestowing her abilities on Nisa rather than on Ulysses.
- Diomedes (voiced by James Carter Cathcart): A member of the crew who set off with Ulysses and the gang to seek to return to Ithaca, he is the oldest one in the group, as well as a king in his own right, and is determined to protect them from danger during the journey. He always has some advice to the others, due to his combat experience.
- Dates (voiced by Marc Thompson): The owner of the ship that replaces Ulysses's wrecked vessel, and a member of the crew, he is greedy and is always on the lookout to make more money. He is not disloyal, however, and is very brave and resourceful. An expatriate from Crete, he has his own wish to see his former home.
- Titan: One of Ulysses' closest friends and the most powerful members of the crew, he comes from the isle of Cronos, where he was to be crowned king, but he let his brother have the throne when he joined Ulysses. He is a towering, horned, blue-skinned humanoid, very loyal to Ulysses, and fond of everyone else in the crew. His speech patterns are erratic; sometimes he doesn't speak at all, sometimes in broken language, and sometimes in complete sentences.
- Philo (voiced by Darren Dunstan): A member of the crew, Philo is always worried about dangers and easily frightened. He is a poet, bard, and historian, and his knowledge proves valuable on many occasions, even if his physical prowess leaves something to be desired. He records the events of the voyage back to Ithaca, and plans to publish them once everyone is home.
- Zephyr (voiced by Jason Griffith): The second youngest member of the crew and an apprentice of Dates. He ran away from his father, the wind god Aeolus, so that he can go on an adventure. It’s largely implied that he reciprocates Nisa’s feelings towards him, since he never rejects her hugs and always blushes whenever she does hug him.
- Owl is sent by Athena to observe Ulysses' journey. It usually scouts ahead the ship on the lookout for danger. Nisa in particular bonds with it the most out of the entire crew, since she had accidentally gotten her powers from Athena’s Owl.
- Penelope (voiced by Colleen Clinkenbeard) is Ulysses' wife and Telemachus's mother. Ever since the start of the Trojan War, she's been waiting for her husband to return to Ithaca while tricking her suitors into believing she will remarry after finishing a certain tapestry that she secretly undoes. Every episode begins with her newly weaved tapestries that foretells what kind of adventure Ulysses and his crewmen will face. Towards the end of the series, she gets forced into an arranged marriage with a foreign prince named Pellos, because the Athenian Senate believes Ulysses has died a long time ago and want Ithaca to have a new king. Penelope refuses to follow through with it until Telemachus ends up kidnapped and threatened. But fortunately, Ulysses turns up alive, reclaims his throne, and saves his family.
- Telemachus (voiced by Alison Viktorin) is the son of Ulysses and Penelope. Unlike the ancient myths, he is portrayed as a small child that is approximately 11 years old for the entire duration of the show, rather than a 20-year-old adult. In every episode's prologue, Telemachus is taught an important lesson by Penelope or plays some sort of game through his mother's newly weaved tapestry, which also foretells what kind of challenge his father and the latter's crewmen face. He will often ask his mother of what kind of man his father is, due to not seeing him since infancy because the latter enlisted in the Trojan War for an entire decade. Towards the end of the show, his mother's arranged fiancé and his prospective stepfather, Pellos, teams up with Poseidon so that they’ll kidnap and murder Telemachus in order to force Penelope to submit with her arranged marriage and become the newest king of Ithaca. But fortunately, Telemachus finally reunites with his father and they come back home to save the kingdom.

=== Olympian Gods and Titans ===
- Athena (voiced by Kathleen Barr): A goddess of wisdom, handcraft, and warfare who guides Ulysses and the gang, along with her pet Owl, to return to his hometown Ithaca. She also ensures that Poseidon does not directly intervene to stop them.
- Poseidon (voiced by Stuart Zagnit) is the brother of both Zeus and Hades, and second oldest of his other siblings behind Demeter, Hera, and Hestia. Poseidon is the main antagonist, though other gods sometimes also hinder Ulysses, usually not through direct action but rather as a result of their egotism and uncontrollable fits of anger. Poseidon commands most of the other villains and antagonists throughout the series, or manipulates them to attack Ulysses.
- Hades is god of the Underworld and brother of Zeus and Poseidon. He is swayed by Poseidon's words, but reveals himself to be fair when his brother's treachery is revealed, and lets Ulysses go on his way..
- Hestia is goddess of family and the hearth, sister of Zeus.
- Hephaestus (voiced by Mike Pollock) is the god of fire and metalworking.
- Gaia (voiced by Diane Delano) is the goddess of Earth. She gives Cronus - her son - the Stones of Life and tells him to use them for creating the Universe.
- Cronus is primordial god and father to Zeus, Poseidon and their siblings. He was defeated and imprisoned by his offspring and cast down.

=== Others ===
- Pegasus
- Aeolus (voiced by Mei Brooks)
- Gildor (voiced by Matthew Wood)
- Pandora (voiced by Emma Main) an automaton created by Hephaestus (as opposed to the human woman usually depicted in myth).
- Calypso (voiced by Erica Schroeder): A beautiful nymph who falls madly in love with Ulysses. Once she discovers Ulysses wishes to return to his wife, Penelope, Calypso becomes determined to trap his crew mates and brainwashed him into believing they’re a couple, until Nisa finds out about her schemes and frees Ulysses. Once Poseidon tries to finish the job on Ulysses, the latter and Calypso team up to defeat the sea god. After all is over and done with, Calypso bids her goodbyes to Ulysses.
- Nausicaa (voiced by Veronica Taylor): A nymph who had wished to become the most beautiful woman in the world, only to end up cursed with men falling in love with her after taking a single look at her face. Poseidon had originally conspired with her two companions to make Ulysses fall for her so that it may compel him to not want to return to Ithaca, only for Titan to see her first.
- Peleas (voiced by Philip Philmar)
- Erinyes (voiced by Tish Hicks)
- Pellos (voiced by Mike Pollock): A handsome and arrogant prince that takes over Ithaca because the Athenian Senate arrange for him and Penelope to wed since Ulysses is presumed dead.

=== Monsters and creatures ===
- Aglaope (voiced by Colleen Clinkenbeard), queen of the sirens who tries to lure Ulysses away from his mission.
- Mira (voiced by Lucy Fry): A siren and one of Aglaope's minions. She was romantically attracted to Zephyr until her desire to destroy him and his companions outweighed her feelings.
- Circe (voiced by Kathleen Barr), the notorious sorceress with a penchant for turning men into animals.
- Fates
  - Lachesis (voiced by (Carole Shelly)
  - Atropos (voiced by Amanda Plummer)
  - Clotho (voiced by Maya Rudolph)
- Chimera
- Kystal and Droplet (voiced by Alexandra Pic), two cute but treacherous water sprites.
- Lycaon
- Telios (voiced by Ted Lewis)
- Aurel (voiced by Jason Griffith)
- Hardix (voiced by Scott McNeil)
- Polyphemus

== Production ==
The series is a production of BAF Berlin Animation Film, Marathon Filmproduction, Marathon Animation, and M6 Metropole Television. Character design was created by David Gilson.

== Episodes ==
1. The Eye of the Cyclops
2. Charybde and Scylla
3. A Trip to the Underworld
4. The Song of the Sirens
5. Circe
6. Memories
7. The Curse of the Strygons
8. Looking for Pegasus
9. The Gorgon Sisters
10. Wind Palace
11. The Forge of Hephaestus
12. Duel of the Centaur
13. I Married a Harpy
14. The Flame of Eternity
15. Lotus Eaters
16. Queen of the Amazons
17. King of the Titans
18. The Mirror of Attraction
19. Atlantis Ascending
20. The Wishing Well
21. Enchanted Lyre
22. Cronos' Revenge
23. Dazed in the Maze
24. The Golden Fleece
25. Hercules' Columns
26. Ulysses' Bow

== Release ==
Distribution rights were acquired in 2009 by Your Family Entertainment AG, which holds indefinite broadcast rights, including ancillary rights for almost all countries.

Its global premiere took place on the French network M6 on 6 September 2002. In Germany, the show was launched on 22 February 2008 on KIKA.
