= June Gable =

American character actress (born 1945)

- Born: June 5, 1945 (age 81); New York City, U.S.
- Occupation: Actress
- Years active: 1969–present

June Gable (born June 5, 1945) is an American character actress, perhaps best known for her role as Joey's agent Estelle Leonard in the NBC sitcom Friends. She received a Tony Award nomination for her work on Broadway.

== Life and career ==
Gable was born in New York City. She enrolled in the Circle in the Square Theatre School when she was 13 years old, and she studied acting at Carnegie Mellon University in Pittsburgh.

Gable has appeared in four Broadway productions including the 1974 revival of Candide for which she was nominated for a Tony Award for Best Featured Actress in a Musical for her portrayal of the Old Lady. She was featured as Snooks Keene in the infamous Broadway disaster, Moose Murders, which opened and closed on the same night in 1983. She also replaced Rita Moreno in The Ritz in 1975. She also appeared in a replacement cast of the off-Broadway revue Jacques Brel is Alive and Well and Living in Paris.

In June 1976 Gable debuted her cabaret act at Brothers and Sisters in New York City. A review in The New York Times said, "She has an easy, natural manner that enables her to move from one type of song to another with brief, amusing introductory explanations that avoid what could very easily be an air of pretentiousness. considering the range of material that she offers."

On television, Gable played Detective Battista on the third season of Barney Miller. She was also in the cast of the short-lived 1977 revival of Rowan & Martin's Laugh-In. In 1979 she appeared as "Rhoda Rooter" on the live-action Hanna-Barbera TV specials Legends of the Superheroes. From 1978 to 1981 she was regular cast member on the syndicated variety series Sha Na Na. In the 1980s she guest starred on popular series including Miami Vice and Kate & Allie, and had small parts in the films Brenda Starr and She-Devil (both 1989). She also appeared in a recurring role in the HBO comedy series Dream On from 1990 to 1996 playing Libby Friedman.

From 1994 to 2004, Gable played Estelle Leonard, the agent of Matt LeBlanc‘s character Joey Tribbiani, on the NBC sitcom Friends. Her character died in 2004 during the show's tenth and final season. She played a nurse on the same show in season 1, episode 23. After Friends, Gable retired from acting. She told Wealthsimple: "As soon as Friends ended, I retired. The man I loved was very ill and I wanted to be able to take care of him". In later years, she performed in productions of The Odd Couple, Picon Pie, and Broads!. In November 2012, she starred in the lead role of Marie in the world premiere of Bill C. Davis' "All Hallowed" at the Waco Civic Theatre in Waco, Texas under the direction of George Boyd.

In 2018, Gable made her first screen appearance in more than 15 years, appearing in the Netflix comedy film The Week Of. In 2022, she starred as Ray Romano's character's mother in the comedy-drama film, Somewhere in Queens.

== Filmography ==
=== Film ===
Year	Title	Role	Director(s)	Notes
1989	Brenda Starr	Luba	Robert Ellis Miller	
1989	She-Devil	Realtor	Susan Seidelman	
2018	The Week Of	Roberta	Robert Smigel	
2022	Somewhere in Queens	Mama Russo	Ray Romano	
2023	Maestro	Old Lady	Bradley Cooper	

=== Television ===
Year	Title	Role	Episodes	Notes
1976	Newman's Drugstore	Shirley Tinker		Television Movie
1976–1977	Barney Miller	Detective Maria Battista	2 episodes — "Noninvolment" (1976) — "Smog Alert" (1977)	
1977	The Bay City Amusement Company	Gail		Television Movie
1977–1978	Laugh-In	Regular performer	series regular (6 episodes)	aka Rowan & Martin's Laugh-In
1978–1981	Sha Na Na	Loraine	unknown episodes	
1979	Legends of the Superheroes	Rhoda Rooter	— "The Roast"	
1987	Crime Story	Aggie the Waitress	— "Little Girl Lost"	
1989	Kate & Allie	unknown role	— "The Review"	
1990	Miami Vice	Dr. Ellen Hardy	— "Too Much, Too Late"	
1990	Head of the Class	Greta Amory	— "Viki's Torn Genes"	
1990–1996	Dream On	Libby Friedman	recurring role (7 episodes)	
1993	Family Album	Mrs. Krevitz	— "Salon, Farewell, Auf Widersehn, Goodbye"	
1994	Mad About You	Woman #1	— "The City"	
1994–2003	Friends	Estelle Leonard / Nurse	recurring role (10 episodes); Guest — "The One with the Birth" (1995)	
1997	The Tony Danza Show	Woman	— "The Milk Run"	
1998	Caroline in the City	Naomi	— "Caroline and the Quiz Show"	
1998	Buddy Faro	unknown role	— "Pilot"	
2000	Sally Hemings: An American Scandal	Madam Dupre		Television Movie
2012	My America	unknown role	— "Annette"	
2016	Nunsense	Sr. Rose Seraphine	unknown episode	

=== Theatre ===
Year	Title	Role	Venue	Notes	Ref
1973	Nash at Nine	Standby	Helen Hayes Theatre		
1974–1976	Candide	Old Lady	Broadway Theatre	740 (performances); Nominated — Tony Award for Best Featured Actress in a Musical	
1975–1976	The Ritz	Googie Gomez	Longacre Theatre	replaced Rita Moreno	
1983	Moose Murders	Snooks Keene	Eugene O'Neill Theatre	13 (previews); 1 (performance)	
