= Stuart Zagnit =

American actor

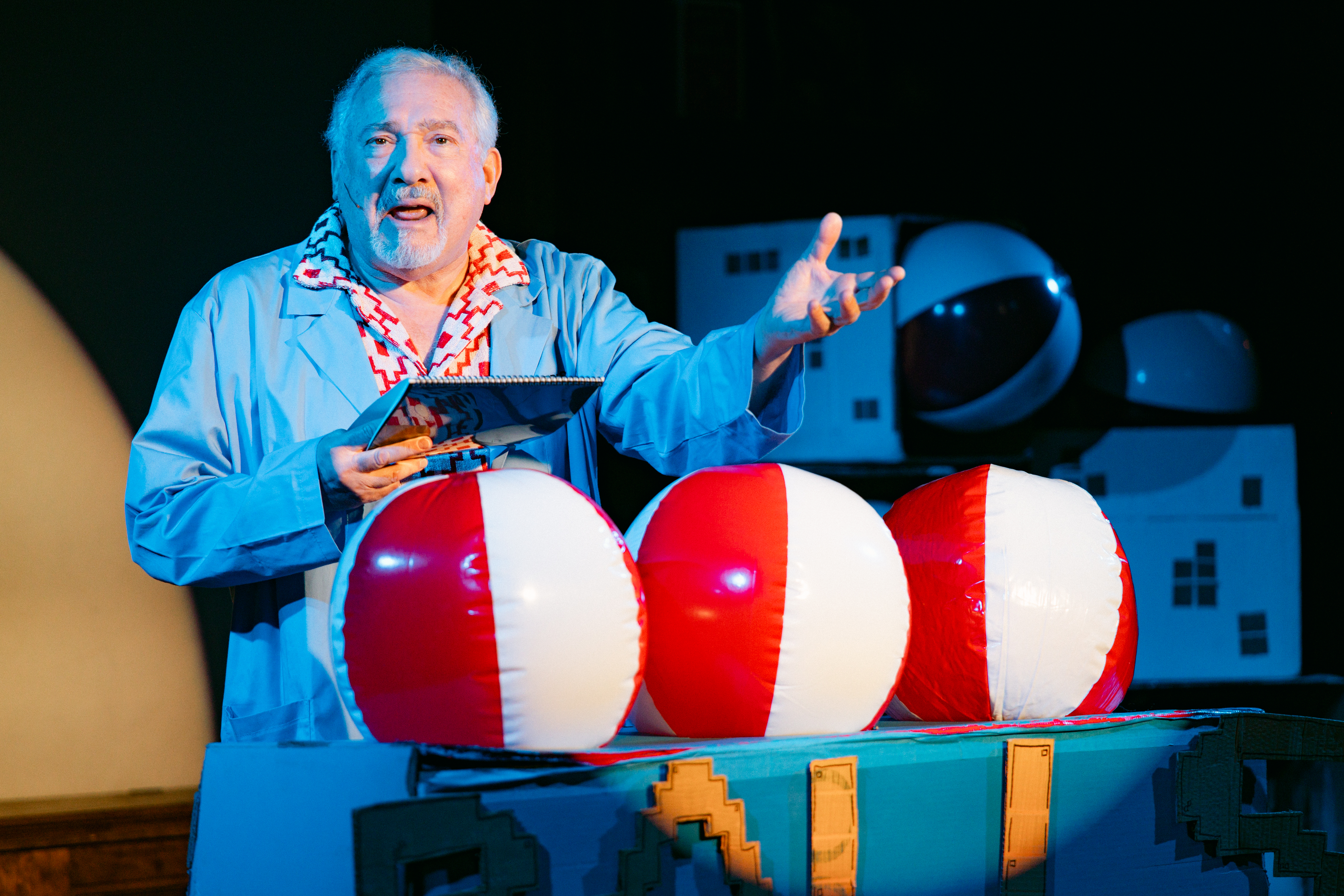
- Zagnit as "The Professor" in BALLS: The Monster-Catchin' Musical Comédy
- Born: Stuart Allen Zagnit; New Brunswick, New Jersey, U.S.
- Other name: Stan Hart
- Education: Montclair State University (BA)
- Occupation: Actor
- Years active: 1982–present

Stuart Zagnit (sometimes credited as Stan Hart) is an American voice, film and television actor. He has worked in Broadway, off-Broadway, regional and national tours, television, films, commercials, and voice-overs. Zagnit has worked as a voice actor for 4Kids Entertainment, DuArt Film and Video, and TAJ Productions. He is best known for voicing Professor Oak in the Pokémon franchise.

== Filmography ==
=== Film ===
- According to Greta - Man on Bus
- Across the Sea - Dr. Stein
- Fault - Joe the Wizard
- Jingle Hell - Scott Flynn
- The Testimony of Erin J - Ron S.

=== Television ===
- 30 Rock - Richard Nixon (in episode Rosemary's Baby)
- The Blacklist - The Haberdasher (in episode "Sutton Ross (No. 17)")
- Blue Bloods - Karl (in episode "Dedication")
- Bull - Potential Juror #11 (in episode "Potential Juror #11")
- Celebrity Ghost Stories - Willy Stiller (in episode "Jerry Stiller, Mindy McCready, Nick Hogan, Lourdes Benedicto")
- Elementary - Josef Shapiro (in episode "Rip Off")
- Instinct - Rabbi (in episode "Bad Actors")
- Law & Order - Harry Shapiro, DDS (in episode "I.D."), Carson (in episode "Justice"), Jim Roker (in episode "Girl Most Likely")
- Law & Order: Criminal Intent - LeMoyne (in episode "Malignant")
- Law & Order: Special Victims Unit - Harrison Barnett (in episode "Folly")
- Small Miracles - Benjamin Metzger (in episode "The Wall")
- The Good Wife - Judge Larry Reardon (in episode "Innocents")

=== Voice roles ===
- Baki the Grappler - Koushou Shinogi, Seicho Kato
- Boundary Break - The Real Professor Oak (in episode "Pokemon Snap")
- Chaotic - Additional Voices
- Class of '09: Puzzle Showdown - The Puzzler
- Grappler Baki: The Ultimate Fighter - Kosho Shinogi / Seicho Kato
- Lost Kingdoms II
- Mission Odyssey - Poseidon
- Napoleon - Penguin
- Pokémon - Professor Oak, Koga, Cedric Juniper
- Shaman King - Additional Voices
- Slayers - Zolf
- Teenage Mutant Ninja Turtles (2003) - Dr. Dome (in episode "Return of the Justice Force"), Zanramon
- The Irresponsible Captain Tylor - Dr. Hidezaburo Kitaguchi, Admiral Yutta Do Lonawer (Eps. 9-10)
- Twin Angels - Dekinobu, Tokihara
- Viva Piñata - Additional Voices
- Winx Club (4Kids Entertainment edit) - Mike

== Theatre ==
- 2025: BALLS: The Monster-Catchin' Musical Comédy - Off-Broadway - The Professor
- 2023-24: Harmony - Broadway - Ensemble, u/s Rabbi
- 2022: Little Shop of Horrors - Off-Broadway - Mr. Mushnik
- 2021: Caroline, or Change - Broadway - Grandpa Gellman
- 2015: Wicked - Munchkinland National Tour - The Wonderful Wizard of Oz
- 2015: The Producers - John Engeman Theater, Northport, L.I. - Max Bialystock
- 2014: Dr. Seuss' How the Grinch Stole Christmas! The Musical - Broadway - Grandpa Who
- 2012: Newsies - Broadway - Swing, u/s Roosevelt
- 2011: The People In The Picture - Broadway - US Krinsky/Doovie
- 2011: The Merry Wives of Windsor (Terrace) - Brooklyn, NY - Sir John Falstaff
- 2009: Dr. Seuss' How the Grinch Stole Christmas! The Musical - Pantages Theater - L.A., CA - Grandpa Who;
- 2009: On The Waterfront - site-specific staged reading at Brooklyn, Manhattan and NJ venues with Brave New World Rep. Theatre - Johnny Friendly;
- 2009: Diary of Anne Frank - Syracuse Stage, NY - Mr. Dussel;
- 2008: Dr. Seuss' How the Grinch Stole Christmas! The Musical - National Tour, Baltimore, MD & Boston, MA - Grandpa Who;
- 2007: Fiddler On The Roof - Syracuse Stage, NY - Tevye
- 2005: Picon Pie - Off-Broadway, DR2 & The Lambs - Jacob 'Yonkel' Kalich
- 2000: Seussical The Musical - Broadway - The Mayor of Whoville
- 2000: The Wild Party (musical, LaChiusa) - Broadway - Goldberg
- 1992 Falsettos - National Tour - Mendel
- 1988-90 Into the Woods - National Tour - The Steward
  (u/s) Baker, Narrator/Mysterious Man, Cinderella's Father
- 1987: Little Shop of Horrors - Off-Broadway - Seymour
