= Sergio Kato =

Brazilian actor

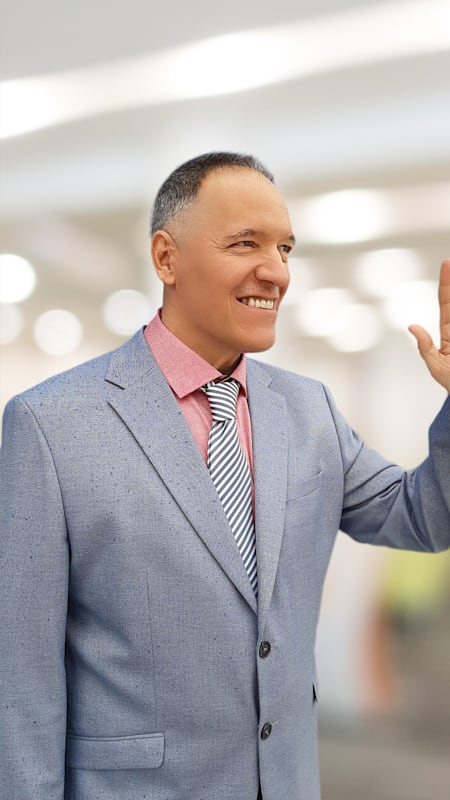
- Kato in 2020
- Born: Sergio Luiz Pereira; July 15, 1960 (age 66); Além Paraíba, Minas Gerais, Brazil
- Citizenship: Brazil; United States
- Occupation: Actor
- Years active: 1970–present
- Spouses: Maureen Carey Hearn (m. 1986; div. 1990) Jacqueline Pereira (m. 2012)
- Children: 4
- Relatives: Mazarópi (brother)
- Website: sergiokato.com

Sérgio Luiz Pereira (born July 15, 1960), stagename Sergio Kato, is a Brazilian-American actor, television host, comedian and former martial artist. He found greater fame in his hometown of Rio de Janeiro, after a stage play at the Scala Rio music venue. Since then, Kato have been working for a number of advertising campaigns, TV shows and films. Former model and active actor 2019. Aside from the acting career, Kato still modeling not as much. Print-adds, campaigns and TV Commercials for grief clothing.

Sergio is brother of former footballer and current football coach Mazarópi.

== Career ==
=== Early work ===
He began his acting career at Teatro O Tablado in Rio de Janeiro, where he studied and worked. Still in Rio de Janeiro, he gained notoriety acting, dancing and singing in spectacles of Scala Rio.

Still young, in 1982 he served the Brazilian Air Force, then in 1985 he moved to the United States. After studying English at California High School, He studied at the University of California, Los Angeles, where he received a Diploma from the UCLA School of Theater, Film and Television. In similar fashion, the movie industry changes rapidly, many projects in Europe and the USA.

=== Cinema and TV career ===
Kato' first TV appearance came in 1976, his first film was Bete Balanço, in 1984, where he played a dancer. He wanted to move from a ballet dancer to acting, finally achieving it when he was chosen to play the role of a cab driver in the Brenda Starr film with Brooke Shields. Later he played a bartender together with Tracey Birdsall-Smith, on the film I Might Even Love You.

In January 1993, just weeks after leaving back to California from Japan, Kato was reading several new scripts for future films, one of them being Only the Strong, an action drama film with Mark Dacascos, written and directed by Sheldon Lettich.

In 1997, Kato did a cameo role on Rede Globo's soap opera A Indomada playing the character Arnold together with the actor José de Abreu.

=== Modelling ===
Sergio Kato signed with modeling agency in New York City, appeared in ads for Calvin Klein with Dylan Bruno and modeled in Paris, Japan and Milan. His modeling career also includes modeling for Polo Ralph Lauren, Giorgio Armani, Dolce & Gabbana, Timex etc.

== Filmography ==
=== Television ===
| Year | Title | Role | Notes |
|---|---|---|---|
| 1970 | One Life to Live | Tom | |
| 1983 | Viva o Gordo | Actor | |
| 1986 | Miami Vice | Nelson Oramus | |
| 1986 | Growing Pains | Leonni | |
| 1993 | Seinfeld | Himself | |
| 1993 | A Different World | Himself | |
| 1993 | Verão Quente | Jonas | |
| 1994 | Você Decide | Pedro | |
| 1995 | Nestor Burma | Sulton | |
| 1996 | The Adventures of Shirley Holmes | Jay Cash | |
| 1997 | A Indomada | Arnold | |
| 1997 | Madame le consul | Le Chauffeur | |
| 1999 | The West Wing | D.C. Cop | |
| 2001 | Mala Racha | Sergio Pereira | |
| 2001 | Casseta & Planeta Urgente | Paulinho | |
| 2002 | Wildfire 7: The Inferno | Dan | TV movie |
| 2003 | Las Vegas | Casino Dealer | |
| 2007–2008 | Tim and Eric Awesome Show, Great Job! | Himself | |
| 2008 | Faça Sua História | Nelso | |
| 2008 | Breaking Bad | DEA Agent Tom | |
| 2009 | Two and a Half Men | Geno | |
| 2009 | Angel and the Bad Man | Gunman 4 | TV movie |
| 2010 | Tyranny | Wallace | |
| 2010 | As Cariocas | Richard | |
| 2010 | Law & Order: LA | Officer Toni | |
| 2012 | As Brasileiras | Rico Sini | |
| 2014 | Complete Works | Armanni | |

=== Film ===
| Year | Title | Role | Notes |
|---|---|---|---|
| 1978 | Se Segura, Malandro! | Antonio | |
| 1980 | O Convite ao Prazer | Castilho | |
| 1980 | Miniero Cabaret | Daniel | |
| 1982 | Rehearsal for Murder | Third Officer | |
| 1983 | The Day After | Detective | |
| 1984 | Missing in Action | Bouncer | Uncredited |
| 1984 | Os Trapalhões e o Mágico de Oróz | Sergio Pereira | |
| 1985 | Kiss of the Spider Woman | Martim, Molina's Friend | |
| 1986 | Short Circuit | Frank | Uncredited |
| 1989 | Brenda Starr | Jose, Cab Driver | |
| 1993 | Indecent Proposal | Tim | Uncredited |
| 1993 | Only the Strong | Silverio's Bodyguard #3 | Uncredited |
| 1993 | Clubland | Nightclub Bouncer | |
| 1994 | True Lies | Bread Van Terrorist #3 | Uncredited |
| 1994 | The Shawshank Redemption | Inmate Two | Uncredited |
| 1997 | Austin Powers: International Man of Mystery | Security Guard | Uncredited |
| 1998 | The Truman Show | Production Assistant | Uncredited |
| 1998 | I Might Even Love You | The Bartender | |
| 2001 | Mala racha | Policeman | |
| 2001 | Flying Virus | Scared Soldier | |
| 2003 | Power Play | Soldier | |
| 2003 | Bulletproof Monk | Merc | Uncredited |
| 2003 | SWAT | Prison Guard | Uncredited |
| 2005 | The Film | Police #2 | |
| 2009 | Mega Shark vs. Giant Octopus | FBI Agent | Uncredited |
| 2009 | Diablo Mountain | Lead Actor | Short film |
| 2010 | Federal | Luis | Uncredited |
| 2011 | Say no to drugs | Cop 5 | Short film |
| 2011 | Shooter | Policeman | Uncredited |
| 2012 | Al Pereira vs. the Alligator Ladies | Nestor | |
| 2013 | Gangster Squad | Officer Lane | Uncredited |
| 2013 | Lone Survivor | Navy Seal | Uncredited |
| 2013 | Chinese Puzzle | Le Deuxieme Fuyard | Uncredited |
| 2013 | Pendejo | Millani | |
| 2014 | Dawn of the Planet of the Apes | Colony Survivor | Uncredited |
| 2014 | Reasonable Doubt | Court Bailiff | Uncredited |
| 2014 | Big Stone Gap | Steve | |
| 2014 | Stunt Games | Agent Duke | |
| 2015 | Terminator Genisys | Guerrilla Officer | Uncredited |
| 2016 | Hail, Caesar | Roman Officer | Uncredited |
| 2016 | Suicide Squad | Hispanic Man | Uncredited |
| 2017 | The Crash | Secret Service Agent | Uncredited |
