= Matthew Locricchio =

American cookbook author and actor (1947–2019)

- Born: June 3, 1947; Detroit, Michigan, U.S.
- Died: January 9, 2019 (aged 71); The Bronx, New York City, U.S.
- Education: Lakeview High School
- Alma mater: Northern Michigan University
- Occupations: Author of cookbooks for young chefs and actor
- Writing career
- Subject: Cookery
- Notable work: The International Cookbook for Kids
- Notable awards: Gourmand World Cookbook Award for Best Book for Children and Family in 2005

Matthew Locricchio (June 3, 1947 – January 9, 2019) was an American author of cookbooks for young chefs and an actor. His cookbook, The International Cookbook for Kids won the Gourmand World Cookbook Award for Best Book for Children and Family in 2005. Locricchio also authored other cookbooks such as Teen Cuisine, Teen Cuisine: New Vegetarian, The 2nd International Cookbook for Kids, and eight individual titles in the Superchef series.

== Biography ==
Matthew Locricchio was born in Detroit, Michigan. He moved with his family to St. Clair Shores, Michigan, where he graduated from Lakeview High School. While in high school and afterwards he worked in his family's catering business and in several of their restaurants. In high school he made his first appearances as an actor in such plays as Come Out of the Closet and Night of January 16th. After attending Northern Michigan University and Eastern Michigan University, he left for San Francisco, California, to study acting at the American Conservatory Theater then run by William Ball.

During his time in San Francisco he appeared in plays at the Magic Theatre by Michael McClure and Sam Shepard. These included Josephine the Mouse Singer, Gorf, and the world premier of Shephard's Buried Child. He also produced and starred in When You Comin' Back, Red Ryder? Bernard Weiner of the San Francisco Chronicle described his performance as Teddy in the latter as "scarily brilliant".

Locricchio later relocated to New York, New York, where he acquired the recurring role of Adams in the NBC daytime soap opera Texas. This was followed by appearances on stage at the Public Theater, Yale Repertory Theatre, Indiana Repertory Theatre, and the Oregon Shakespeare Festival in plays by Václav Havel, William Shakespeare, and David Mamet. He also was seen on television in Kate and Allie, Saturday Night Live, and in the TV movie Stone Pillow with Lucille Ball.

After nearly thirty years as an actor, Locricchio changed his focus to writing cookbooks for young chefs. Eight cookbooks of his were published by Marshall Cavendish's Benchmark Books imprint under the series name Superchef. These titles, each focusing on a specific country, introduced young readers to the cooking of Brazil, China, France, Greece, India, Italy, Mexico, and Thailand. This series has been in print since 2002 and is now in its second edition.

He later wrote The International Cookbook for Kids, which was the 2005 winner of the Gourmand World Cookbook Awards as Best Book for Children and Family in the USA. It also was the Disney Adventures Book Award-Winner in the “Hands-On” category. Rosemary Black in the Daily News (New York) described this book as “picture perfect for beginning cooks. Locricchio followed this title with a sequel, The 2nd International Cookbook for Kids in 2008, which The New York Times said is one of several titles that "...points in a new direction going beyond cookies and other treats to teach children to cook main courses and side dishes.

More recent titles from Matthew Locricchio were written for a slightly older readership. In 2010 Teen Cuisine was released. Booklist’s Gillian Engberg described this as an “inspiring, contemporary guide, which should be a first suggestion to any aspiring young chef. Houston Chronicle's review stated that Teen Cuisine "...gives teenagers a slew of recipes to sink their teeth into. Better yet, they are recipes that don't require a can opener."

Locricchio's last title was Teen Cuisine: New Vegetarian, which was published by Amazon Children's Publishing, a division of Amazon Publishing in late 2012. In April 2013 this book won the International Association of Culinary Professionals 2013 award as Best Cookbook for Children, Youth, and Family. He died at his home in New York City on January 9, 2019.

== Cookbooks ==
- The Cooking of Brazil, Marshall Cavendish Benchmark
- The Cooking of China, Marshall Cavendish Benchmark
- The Cooking of France, Marshall Cavendish Benchmark
- The Cooking of Greece, Marshall Cavendish Benchmark
- The Cooking of India, Marshall Cavendish Benchmark
- The Cooking of Italy, Marshall Cavendish Benchmark
- The Cooking of Mexico, Marshall Cavendish Benchmark
- The Cooking of Thailand, Marshall Cavendish Benchmark
- The International Cookbook for Kids, Marshall Cavendish Children's Books
- The 2nd International Cookbook for Kids, Marshall Cavendish Children's Books
- Teen Cuisine, Marshall Cavendish Children's Books
- Teen Cuisine New Vegetarian, Amazon Children's Publishing

== Stage performances ==
- Hyde in Hollywood (1989) Playwrights Horizons
- Of Mice and Men (1987) Roundabout Theatre Company
- Largo Desolato (1986) New York Shakespeare Festival
- Fool for Love (1984) Douglas Fairbanks Theater
- Buried Child (1978) Magic Theatre
- When You Comin' Back, Red Ryder? (1976) Eureka Theater

== Filmography ==
- The Streets of San Francisco (1977, TV Series) – Aaron Fesler
- Escape from Alcatraz (1979) – Exam Guard
- Cardiac Arrest (1980) – Fred Eaton
- Bitter Harvest (1981) – Worker
- Texas (1982) – Adams
- Stone Pillow (1985, TV Movie) – Tony
- Kate & Allie (1986) – Donnie
- Robot in the Family (1994) – Clyde Baldino
- Law & Order
  - The Reaper's Helper (1990) – Court Officer
  - Turnaround (1997) – Airport Manager
