= Barbara Minkus =

American actress and singer (born 1943)

- Born: August 15, 1943 (age 83); Chicago, Illinois, U.S.
- Education: Immaculate Heart College, Los Angeles (B.A., 1979); California Family Study Center (M.A., 1981)
- Occupations: Actress, singer, psychotherapist
- Years active: 1966–present
- Spouse: Arnold Barron (m. 1972)
- Children: 2

Barbara Minkus (born 1943) is an American actress, singer, and psychotherapist whose career has included work in theater, television, cabaret, and counseling. She appeared on television programs including The Danny Kaye Show, The Merv Griffin Show, The Tonight Show, and Love, American Style, and performed on stage in productions including Funny Girl, The Education of Hyman Kaplan, Picon Pie, and Saturday Night at Grossinger's.

She later developed autobiographical one-woman shows, including I'm Not Famous and 18 Minutes of Fame: A Musical Journey with Barbara Minkus, based on her career and personal life. Minkus also earned a graduate degree in marriage and family therapy and worked as a psychotherapist.

== Early life and education ==
Barbara Minkus was born on August 15, 1943 in Chicago, the daughter of Leslie David Minkus and Bernice (Hyman) Minkus. She grew up in the Chicago area in a Jewish family that owned Leslie's Department Store, which had been founded in Chicago by her grandfather, Lewis Minkus. As a child, Minkus experienced problems with her weight and later described having an eating disorder as well as dyslexia and other learning difficulties.

In 1979 Minkus earned her B.A. from Immaculate Heart College, and in 1981 she received her master's degree in marriage and family therapy from California Family Study Center.

== Career ==
Minkus began her professional performing career in New York in the early 1960s in Julius Monk's revue Bits and Pieces. She later toured as Fanny Brice in Funny Girl. She also played Lucy in the original New York recording of You're a Good Man, Charlie Brown. In 1968, Minkus appeared on Broadway in The Education of H*Y*M*A*N K*A*P*L*A*N, directed by George Abbott, with Tom Bosley and Hal Linden. The production opened on April 4, 1968, the day Martin Luther King Jr. was assassinated, and closed after a short run.

Minkus worked in television during the 1960s and 1970s. She appeared on The Danny Kaye Show, The Merv Griffin Show, and The Tonight Show, and was a regular performer on Love, American Style. She also played Gittel the Witch on the ABC children's series Curiosity Shop and provided the voice of Ms. Pac-Man in the animated series Pac-Man.

Minkus returned to the stage at the Santa Monica Playhouse in Funny, You Don't Look Like a Grandmother. She later portrayed Yiddish theater performer Molly Picon in Picon Pie at the Santa Monica Playhouse and in an Off-Broadway production. She also portrayed Jennie Grossinger in the musical Saturday Night at Grossinger's. Her regional theater work included playing Miss Lynch in Grease at The Muny in St. Louis and Yente in Fiddler on the Roof at the Muny and the Starlight Theatre in Kansas City. She also appeared in Los Angeles and Off-Broadway productions of Don't Leave It All to Your Children.

Minkus later developed autobiographical musical theater with director Susan Morgenstern. The two co-wrote I'm Not Famous: A Musical Journey with Barbara Minkus, which was performed at the Santa Monica Playhouse. The production combined songs with accounts of Minkus's career and family life. It also included material drawn from her work as a psychotherapist. The show was subsequently revised and retitled 18 Minutes of Fame: A Musical Journey with Barbara Minkus. 18 Minutes of Fame was presented in Los Angeles and New York, including performances at the Pico Playhouse, the Triad Theater, and The Braid. In August 2023, Minkus performed the show at the York Theatre in Manhattan in a two-performance engagement directed by Morgenstern, with Ron Barnett as musical director. The production incorporated songs, photographs, recordings, film and stories from Minkus's career.

In 2023, Minkus appeared in the Group Rep production of Kander and Ebb's 70, Girls, 70 at the Lonny Chapman Theatre in Los Angeles, sharing the role of Ida. She had previously appeared in a Musical Theatre Guild production of the musical as Sadie and a grandmother.

== Personal life ==
Minkus married Arnold Barron, an eye surgeon, in 1972. She has two children.
