= Stone Pillow =

1985 television film directed by George Schaefer

- Genre: Drama
- Written by: Rose Leiman Goldemberg
- Directed by: George Schaefer
- Starring: Lucille Ball; Daphne Zuniga
- Music by: Georges Delerue
- Country of origin: United States
- Original language: English

Production
- Executive producer: Merrill H. Karpf
- Producers: George Schaefer; Merrill H. Karpf
- Production location: New York City
- Cinematography: Walter Lassally
- Editor: Andy Blumenthal
- Running time: 100 minutes
- Production companies: Schaefer/Karpf Productions; Gaylord Productions

Original release
- Network: CBS
- Release: November 5, 1985

Stone Pillow is a 1985 American made-for-television drama film directed by George Schaefer and written by Rose Leiman Goldemberg. It stars Lucille Ball, in an attempt to make a dramatic "breakout" from her years in comedy, portraying an older homeless woman with few resources and even fewer options.

== Plot ==
Carrie Lange has just begun her career in social work. She wants to make a difference but must first learn what life is really like for New York City's homeless. She meets an elderly woman named Florabelle, who makes it known she does not want company or help. Equipped with the precious cart that contains all of her belongings, Flora takes care of herself on the streets of Manhattan. Carrie wins Flora's trust after saving her cart. Flora takes her for a runaway, and Carrie plays along as Flora finds her the best food and warmest places the streets have to offer. Flora even divulges painful memories about her past life. They go to Grand Central Terminal for the night, but are separated after the police throw everyone out.

Flora looks for Carrie at a shelter and is stunned to find her working there. She feels she has been betrayed. Against her will, Flora is shuttled off to a woman's shelter in Brooklyn, where she is treated poorly, and then must find her way back to Manhattan. Finding compassion difficult to come by even in those within her profession, Carrie decides she can make a difference one person at a time. Finally realizing she cannot go on living the way she does, Flora accepts Carrie's helping hand. Through Carrie's intervention, for the first time in years, Flora has a place to call home.

== Cast ==
- Lucille Ball as Florabelle
- Daphne Zuniga as Carrie Lange
- William Converse-Roberts as Max
- Stephen Lang as Tim
- Susan Batson as Ruby
- Anna Maria Horsford as Collins
- Stefan Schnabel as Mr. Berman
- Rebecca Schull as Mrs. Nelson
- Imogene Bliss as Violet

== Reception ==
The movie was broadcast on CBS in November 1985. The film received mixed reviews, but was a ratings success. The telecast ranked 9th out of 68 programs airing that week and brought in a 23.3 rating and a 33 share. The success of the film led Ball to make one last attempt to return to her comedy roots with Life with Lucy the next year. John J. O'Connor, in his review in The New York Times, wrote: " Stone Pillow is a carefully contrived concoction, earnest but not above being cute and nearly outrageous in its determination to jerk a few tears. Accepted on that level, the exercise works reasonably well.... Miss Ball is in total control, from the opening scene in which, emerging from a cocoon bed of green plastic garbage bags, she takes one look at the world and proclaims, 'Well, I'm still here.'"
