= The Burning Bed =

Television film inspired by a 1977 murder related to domestic abuse

- Original newspaper advertisement
- Genre: Crime; drama
- Based on: The Burning Bed by Faith McNulty
- Written by: Rose Leiman Goldemberg
- Directed by: Robert Greenwald
- Starring: Farrah Fawcett; Paul Le Mat; Richard Masur
- Theme music composer: Charles Gross
- Country of origin: United States
- Original language: English

Production
- Executive producers: Jon Avnet; Steve Tisch
- Producer: Carol Schreder
- Cinematography: Isidore Mankofsky
- Editors: Richard W. Fetterman; Michael A. Stevenson
- Running time: 95 minutes
- Production company: Tisch/Avnet Productions Inc.

Original release
- Network: NBC
- Release: October 8, 1984

The Burning Bed is a 1984 American true crime biographical television film about domestic violence. It was directed by Robert Greenwald. The screenplay was written by Rose Leiman Goldemberg, based on the 1980 book "The Burning Bed", by Faith McNulty.

The Burning Bed stars Farrah Fawcett, Paul Le Mat, Richard Masur, Grace Zabriskie, and James Callahan.

The movie tells the story of a battered housewife, Francine Hughes, her past, and her courtroom trial for the murder of her abusive ex-husband, James Berlin "Mickey" Hughes.

The real-life Francine set fire to the bed her husband was sleeping in at their Dansville, Michigan, home on March 9, 1977, after thirteen years of physical domestic abuse at his hands.

The Burning Bed aired on NBC on October 8, 1984. It premiered with a household share of 36.2. It is the seventeenth highest rated movie to air on network television, and NBC's highest rated television movie.

The Burning Bed was met with critical acclaim, receiving eight nominations at the 37th Primetime Emmy Awards.

It was also nominated for three Golden Globe Awards; of these, Paul Le Mat won the Golden Globe award for Best Supporting Actor in a Miniseries or Television Film.

== Plot ==
On March 9, 1977, Francine Hughes and her three children arrive at the Dansville, Michigan, police station, where she turns herself in, after setting her husband, James Berlin “Mickey” Hughes, on fire in their home. Public defender Aryon Greydanus is appointed as Francine’s attorney and tries to gain insight into her motive. Initially reluctant, Francine recounts her life and the events leading up to the murder.

In 1963, sixteen-year-old Francine meets Mickey Hughes, and the two marry shortly after. Mickey begins displaying signs of jealousy and anger and physically abuses Francine, often in the presence of his parents. The abuse escalates over the years, and circumstances worsen with Mickey’s alcoholism. Francine divorces Mickey and takes their three young children. Mickey tries to convince Francine to get back together with him, promising he has changed his ways, but Francine refuses. After learning Mickey has been involved in a serious car crash, Francine agrees to care for him temporarily in his parents’ home; however, the situation eventually traps Francine into a domestic partnership with him. As the children get older, Francine takes business courses at a community college, much to Mickey’s disapproval. Mickey’s abuse becomes relentless, and Francine tries to leave numerous times, only for Mickey to follow her and threaten her into returning. She also seeks help from the police, family courts, and Mickey’s family, but to no avail.

As the case goes to trial, Francine testifies about the horrifying instances of abuse she suffered from Mickey over the years and what happened the day of the murder:

Francine returns home late from school after giving a classmate a ride home, enraging a drunken Mickey. He refuses to allow her to cook TV dinners for the family and beats her. He then orders her to quit school and when Francine refuses, he destroys her school books and forces her to burn them. Later that night at dinner, Mickey beats her again and knocks the food onto the floor. He rubs Francine’s face in the mess and orders her to quit school again. A defeated Francine agrees. Afterwards, Mickey rapes her and falls asleep in a drunken stupor. Francine goes to the garage and obtains a can of gasoline, which she pours over Mickey’s body. She takes her children to the car and drives away as the house becomes engulfed in flames. As the jury returns from deliberation, Francine is found not guilty by reason of temporary insanity, and she is embraced by her children as a free woman.

== Cast ==
- Farrah Fawcett as Francine Hughes
- Paul Le Mat as James Berlin "Mickey" Hughes
- Richard Masur as Aryon (Arjen) Greydanus
- Grace Zabriskie as Flossie Hughes
- Penelope Milford as Gaby
- Christa Denton as Christy Hughes, age 12
  - Heather Rich as Christy age 6
- James T. Callahan as Berlin Hughes
- Gary Grubbs as District Attorney
- David Friedman as Jimmy Hughes, age 10
  - Justin Gocke as Jimmy age 4
- David Andrews as Wimpy Hughes
- James Hampton as Police Witness
- Virgil Frye as Virg
- Dixie K. Wade as Hazel Moran
- Elizabeth Lyn Fraser as Nicole Hughes
- Jeremy Ross as Judge Hotchkiss

== Production ==
=== Casting ===
After purchasing the rights to the book by Faith McNulty, executive producer commented on Farrah Fawcett's casting: "When we bought the book, we knew that Farrah was interested in playing the part, and we talked to her about it. We told her it would mean working with no makeup, going completely against her image, and she was willing." During production, director Robert Greenwald stated that Fawcett "pushed herself to the limits. She's wanted to make this as gritty as possible."

Prior to beginning the shoot, Greenwald held two weeks of rehearsals with Fawcett and her co-star, Paul Le Mat.

=== Filming ===
Filming partly took place inside a private residence in Pacoima, California. During a scene in which Francine's husband locks her in a closet, Greenwald directed Fawcett to be locked in the closet for thirty minutes before beginning filming, and during the courtroom scenes, Fawcett sat in the same hard-backed chair for up to four hours at a time. Greenwald stated that he felt the physical strain contributed to the actress's performance. The courtroom sequence was done a GMT Studios stage one in Culver City.

== Release ==
The Burning Bed first aired on NBC on October 8, 1984. It premiered with a household share of 36.2, ranking it the seventeenth highest rated movie to air on network television and NBC's highest rated television film at that time.

=== Copycat crimes ===
Within the first week following the film's television premiere, two crimes occurred in which the accused perpetrators claimed to have been inspired after watching it. Within less than an hour of viewing the film, Joseph Brandt doused his estranged wife with gasoline inside their Milwaukee home and set her on fire. Brandt was later charged with second-degree murder. Shortly after, Alondra Thompson, a woman recently released from a psychiatric hospital, critically wounded her boyfriend after shooting him while he was sleeping, claiming to police that the film had inspired her act.

In response to the crimes, UCLA psychiatrist Louis J. West argued that Brandt and Thompson would likely have committed the crimes regardless of viewing the film, stating: "Millions of people saw it, and they didn’t burn their spouses."

=== Home media ===
CBS/Fox Video released The Burning Bed on VHS in 1986. MGM Home Entertainment released the film on DVD in 2004. Kino Lorber later issued DVD and Blu-ray editions on November 7, 2017.

== Reception ==
=== Critical response ===
John J. O'Connor of The New York Times praised Fawcett's performance as "admirably strong," also praising the performances by Paul Le Mat, Grace Zabriskie, and James Callahan, concluding that the film "adds up to riveting, sometimes memorable drama." David Wecker of The Cincinnati Post awarded the film a favorable review, describing it as "a quality movie, totally devoid of Hollywood hokum," and praised Fawcett's performance as groundbreaking. The Pittsburgh Post-Gazette's Ron Weiskind also praised Fawcett's lead performance, adding that "she is not the only reason The Burning Bed grabs the viewer's attention and rivets it to the screen. Every aspect of this film has been handled with care." Alan Pergmaent, writing for The Buffalo News, noted that despite some "haphazard" editing, declared it "one of the most powerful and unpleasant films ever put on the small screen."

Marvin Kitman of Newsday noted the film's realism but felt it was too extreme, writing: "After awhile, The Burning Bed plays almost like a videotape of real life. It's raw and depressing... In the end, The Burning Bed is depressing, not exhilarating, more a videotape of one woman's terrible life experience and newsreel footage of a trial. It is not great art." The Detroit Free Press's Mike Duffy similarly noted the film's raw presentation of events, but felt it served the subject matter: "It is not a pretty picture. But then, wife-beating is not a pretty subject. The Burning Bed, however, is a compelling picture. It addresses a serious national misery without resorting to simplistic melodrama or sentimental handwringing." Peter Farrell of The Sunday Oregonian was unimpressed by the film, describing Rose Leiman Goldember's teleplay as "flat" and describing it as "merely another message movie—timed to coincide with National Domestic Violence Week."

In his 2016 book co-written with Alan Sepinwall titled TV (The Book), television critic Matt Zoller Seitz named The Burning Bed as the 7th greatest American TV movie of all time, writing, "The film was a landmark in terms of content, depicting domestic violence as an unambiguous horror and a human rights violation". Seitz also praised the performance of Farrah Fawcett as "one of the finest in the history of TV-movies".

=== Accolades ===
Award/association	Year	Category	Recipient(s) and nominee(s)	Result	Ref.
American Cinema Editors	1985	Best Edited Miniseries or Motion Picture	Michael A. Stevenson; Richard Fetterman	Nominated	
Casting Society of America	1985	Best Casting for TV Miniseries or TV Movie of the Week	Ross Brown; Mary West	Nominated	
Directors Guild of America Awards	1985	Outstanding Directorial Achievement in Dramatic Specials	Robert Greenwald	Nominated	
Golden Globe Awards	1985	Best Supporting Actor – Miniseries or Television Film	Paul Le Mat	Won	
Golden Globe Awards	1985	Best Actress – Miniseries or Television Film	Farrah Fawcett	Nominated	
Golden Globe Awards	1985	Best Miniseries or Television Film	The Burning Bed	Nominated	
Primetime Emmy Awards	1985	Outstanding Lead Actress in a Limited Series or a Special	Farrah Fawcett	Nominated	
Primetime Emmy Awards	1985	Outstanding Supporting Actor in a Limited Series or Movie	Richard Masur	Nominated	
Primetime Emmy Awards	1985	Outstanding Directing in a Limited Series or Special	Robert Greenwald	Nominated	
Primetime Emmy Awards	1985	Outstanding Editing in a Limited Series or Movie	Richard W. Fetterman; Michael A. Stevenson	Nominated	
Primetime Emmy Awards	1985	Outstanding Hairstyling	Stephen Robinette	Nominated	
Primetime Emmy Awards	1985	Outstanding Makeup	Fred Blau; Michael A. Hancock	Nominated	
Primetime Emmy Awards	1985	Outstanding Writing in a Limited Series or a Special	Rose Leiman Goldemberg	Nominated	
Primetime Emmy Awards	1985	Outstanding Drama/Comedy Special	The Burning Bed	Nominated	
TCA Awards	1985	Outstanding Achievement in Specials	The Burning Bed	Won	
TCA Awards	1985	Outstanding Achievement in Specials	Farrah Fawcett	Nominated	
TCA Awards	1985	Outstanding Achievement in Drama	Farrah Fawcett	Nominated	
TCA Awards	1985	Outstanding Achievement in Drama	The Burning Bed	Nominated	
TCA Awards	1985	Program of the Year	The Burning Bed	Nominated	
Writers Guild of America Awards	1985	Best Adapted Drama Anthology	Rose Leiman Goldemberg	Won	
