= Francine Hughes =

American domestic violence victim

- Born: Francine Moran Hughes; August 17, 1947; Stockbridge, Michigan, U.S.
- Died: March 22, 2017 (aged 69); Leighton, Alabama, U.S.
- Occupation: Nurse
- Known for: Killing her husband after years of abuse, and being found not guilty by reason of temporary insanity

Francine Moran Hughes (later Wilson; August 17, 1947 – March 22, 2017) was an American woman who, after thirteen years of domestic abuse, set fire to the bed in which her live-in ex-husband Mickey Hughes was sleeping, on March 9, 1977, in Dansville, Michigan. Mickey was killed and the house destroyed in the resulting fire. At trial, Hughes was found not guilty by reason of temporary insanity in one of the first cases involving "battered-woman syndrome" as a defense.

== Early life ==
Francine Hughes was born in Stockbridge, Michigan. Her mother named her Francine after a French musician. Her father, a farmworker, was an abusive alcoholic. At age 16, Francine left high school to marry 18-year-old James "Mickey" Hughes. They had four children together: Christie, James "Jimmy" Berlin Jr, Nicole, and Dana. The movie about Hughes' story The Burning Bed includes only the first three children.

== Abuse ==
Although she had moved out after their divorce was finalized in April 1971, Mickey had moved back in with her after he was involved in a serious car accident that summer. Francine later testified in court that although she was reluctant to have him return to the home, she felt she could not refuse as she did not want to "hurt him more...than he already had been", referring to the severity of his injuries from the accident.

The abuse persisted and escalated in the years after Mickey's recovery, and he regularly beat her, destroyed furniture and killed their daughter's kitten. Francine felt that she could not remove Mickey from the home or move out herself, fearing that he would make good on his constant threats to kill her. She obtained her GED and, in 1976, enrolled in a secretarial course in an effort to obtain some independence.

== Crime and trial ==
On the day of the fire, March 9, 1977, Francine returned from her secretarial course in the afternoon and found Mickey intoxicated and irate. He refused to allow her to make food for their four children, and berated her for some time about quitting school, which she refused to agree to, even after Mickey forced her to burn her schoolbooks. He began to physically assault her. The police came and spoke to the pair, but left after refusing to arrest Mickey as he had not assaulted her in front of them. However, a police officer would later testify that Mickey had warned her that "it was all over" for her because she had called the police.

After the police left, Mickey resumed beating Francine. Francine again attempted to make dinner for herself and the children, but Mickey swept the food onto the floor and rubbed her face into the mess. He threatened Francine with a knife, then forced her to the floor by bending her arm behind her back and made her clean the mess with her hands. When she was finished, he dumped out the trash can on the floor and forced her to clean it again. Finally, he forced her to agree to quit secretarial school and burn her textbooks.

After Mickey forced Francine to cook his dinner, he raped her. She suffered through this last assault until he finally fell into a drunken slumber. She decided to wait for their youngest child, Dana, to return home. When he did not return after some time, Francine decided to burn the house down to prevent a return to life with Mickey.

Francine told the three children to put on their coats and wait in the car. She then poured gasoline around Mickey's bed and lit the gasoline. The resulting fire consumed the home. In the meantime, with her children in the car, Francine drove to the police station so she could confess to the murder.

At her trial in Lansing, Michigan, two of Francine's children testified that their father had hit their mother "a lot of times" over the years. Francine was found not guilty by reason of temporary insanity. Both the prosecution and the defense agreed that Francine's plight was sympathetic. However, no jurors have ever confirmed publicly whether that was a factor in their decision.

Her mother later said, "You did what was best for your husband."

== Later years ==
In 1980, Hughes married Robert Wilson, a country musician, and became a nurse. She was an LPN and worked at several nursing homes. After retiring, she sat with the elderly and taught a nursing class. She died in Leighton, Alabama on March 22, 2017, from complications of pneumonia that she developed in late 2016. She was 69.

== Cultural impact ==
Hughes set a legal precedent with her case and began a new wave of fighting for domestic abuse to be recognized as a serious issue. A book about her situation, titled The Burning Bed, was the basis of a 1984 made-for-television movie with the same name, starring Farrah Fawcett. According to National Public Radio as broadcast on April 3, 2017, the song "Independence Day" written by Gretchen Peters and made popular by Martina McBride is about this event.

Folk singer Lyn Hardy also created a song about these events entitled "The Ballad of Francine Hughes".

== See also ==
- Kiranjit Ahluwalia, a British Indian woman with extremely similar circumstances
- List of homicides in Michigan
